= 2013 Food City 500 =

Race details
- Race 4 of 36 in the 2013 NASCAR Sprint Cup Series
- Date: March 17, 2013
- Location: Bristol Motor Speedway in Bristol, Tennessee
- Course: Permanent racing facility
- Course length: 0.533 miles (0.858 km)
- Distance: 500 laps, 266.5 mi (428.89 km)
- Weather: Rain with a temperature around 66 °F (19 °C); wind out of the SW at 9 miles per hour (14 km/h)
- Average speed: 92.206 mph (148.391 km/h)

Pole position
Driver	Kyle Busch	Joe Gibbs Racing
- Time: 14.813 seconds

Most laps led
Driver	Denny Hamlin	Joe Gibbs Racing
- Laps: 117

Winner
No. 5	Kasey Kahne	Hendrick Motorsports

Television in the United States
- Network: Fox
- Announcers: Mike Joy, Darrell Waltrip, and Larry McReynolds
- Nielsen ratings: 4.6/11 (7.519 million viewers)

The 2013 Food City 500 was a NASCAR Sprint Cup Series stock car race held on March 17, 2013, at Bristol Motor Speedway in Bristol, Tennessee. Contested over 500 laps on the 0.533 mile (0.858 km) concrete oval, it was the fourth race of the 2013 Sprint Cup Series championship. Kasey Kahne of Hendrick Motorsports won the race, while Kyle Busch finished second. Brad Keselowski, Kurt Busch, and Clint Bowyer rounded out the top five.

== Report ==
=== Background ===
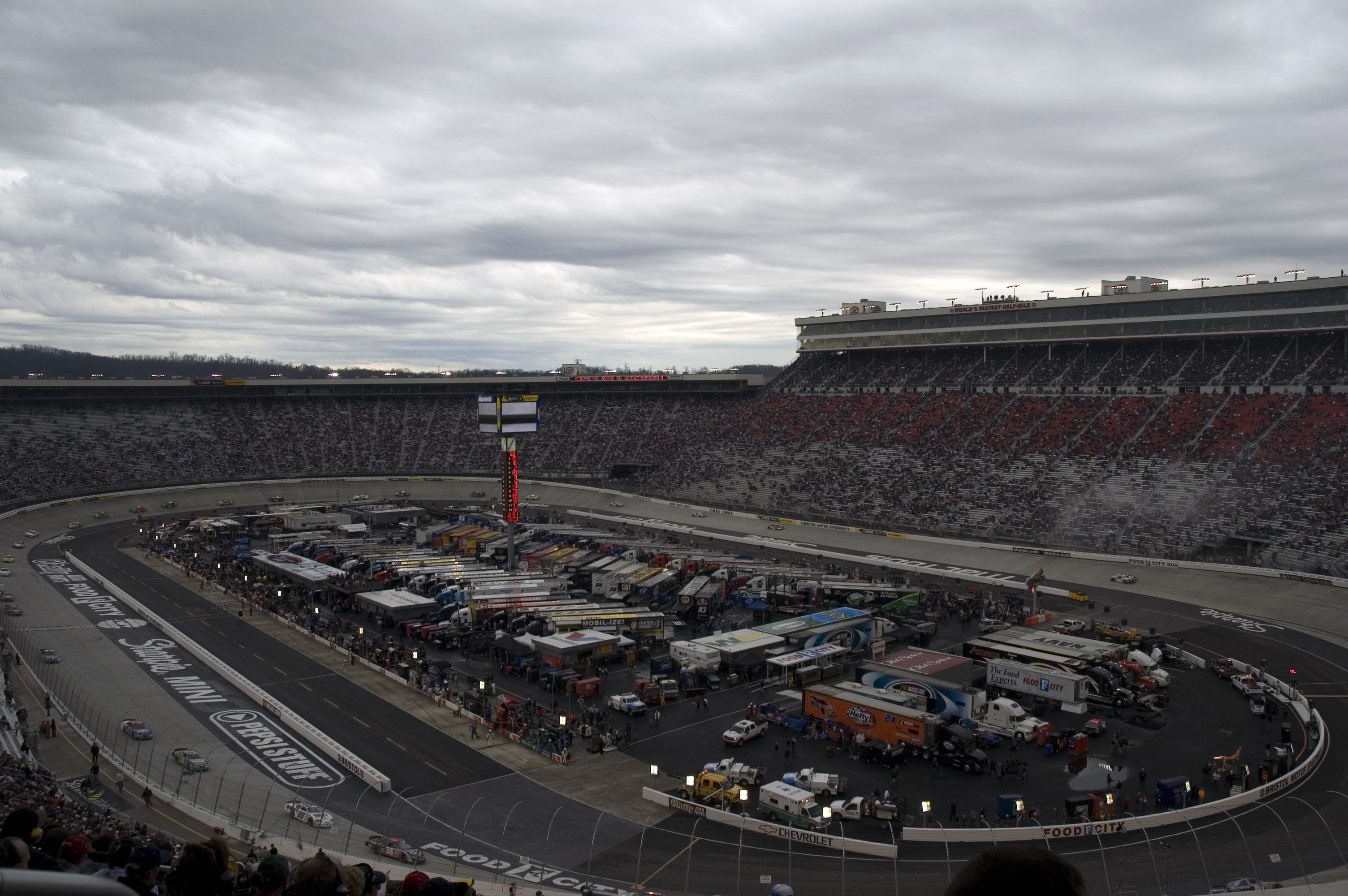
Bristol Motor Speedway, the track where the race was held.

Bristol Motor Speedway, is a four-turn short track oval that is 0.533 miles (0.858 km) long. The track's turns are banked from twenty-four to thirty degrees, while the front stretch, the location of the finish line, is banked from six to ten degrees. The back stretch also has banking from six to ten degrees. The track has a seating capacity of 160,000 people. The race consists of 500 laps, which is equivalent to a race distance of 266.5 miles (428.9 km).

Before the race, Jimmie Johnson was leading the Drivers' Championship with 129 points, while Brad Keselowski stood in second with 124 points. Dale Earnhardt Jr. followed in the third position, seventeen points ahead of Denny Hamlin and Carl Edwards in fourth and fifth. Mark Martin, with 95, was two points ahead of Matt Kenseth and Greg Biffle, as Clint Bowyer was one point ahead of Aric Almirola in tenth, and two points ahead of Ricky Stenhouse Jr. Paul Menard completed the first twelve positions with 82 points. The defending winner of the race was Keselowski, who won the race in 2012.

=== Entry list ===
(R) - Denotes rookie driver.

(i) - Denotes driver who is ineligible for series driver points.

No.	Driver	Team	Manufacturer
1	Jamie McMurray	Earnhardt Ganassi Racing	Chevrolet
2	Brad Keselowski	Penske Racing	Ford
5	Kasey Kahne	Hendrick Motorsports	Chevrolet
7	Dave Blaney	Tommy Baldwin Racing	Chevrolet
9	Marcos Ambrose	Richard Petty Motorsports	Ford
10	Danica Patrick (R)	Stewart–Haas Racing	Chevrolet
11	Denny Hamlin	Joe Gibbs Racing	Toyota
13	Casey Mears	Germain Racing	Ford
14	Tony Stewart	Stewart–Haas Racing	Chevrolet
15	Clint Bowyer	Michael Waltrip Racing	Toyota
16	Greg Biffle	Roush Fenway Racing	Ford
17	Ricky Stenhouse Jr. (R)	Roush Fenway Racing	Ford
18	Kyle Busch	Joe Gibbs Racing	Toyota
19	Mike Bliss (i)	Humphrey Smith Racing	Toyota
20	Matt Kenseth	Joe Gibbs Racing	Toyota
22	Joey Logano	Penske Racing	Ford
24	Jeff Gordon	Hendrick Motorsports	Chevrolet
27	Paul Menard	Richard Childress Racing	Chevrolet
29	Kevin Harvick	Richard Childress Racing	Chevrolet
30	David Stremme	Swan Racing	Toyota
31	Jeff Burton	Richard Childress Racing	Chevrolet
32	Terry Labonte	FAS Lane Racing	Ford
33	Landon Cassill (i)	Circle Sport	Chevrolet
34	David Ragan	Front Row Motorsports	Ford
35	Josh Wise (i)	Front Row Motorsports	Ford
36	J. J. Yeley	Tommy Baldwin Racing	Chevrolet
38	David Gilliland	Front Row Motorsports	Ford
39	Ryan Newman	Stewart–Haas Racing	Chevrolet
42	Juan Pablo Montoya	Earnhardt Ganassi Racing	Chevrolet
43	Aric Almirola	Richard Petty Motorsports	Ford
44	Scott Riggs	Xxxtreme Motorsports	Ford
47	Bobby Labonte	JTG Daugherty Racing	Toyota
48	Jimmie Johnson	Hendrick Motorsports	Chevrolet
51	A. J. Allmendinger	Phoenix Racing	Chevrolet
55	Brian Vickers (i)	Michael Waltrip Racing	Toyota
56	Martin Truex Jr.	Michael Waltrip Racing	Toyota
78	Kurt Busch	Furniture Row Racing	Chevrolet
83	David Reutimann	BK Racing	Toyota
87	Joe Nemechek (i)	NEMCO-Jay Robinson Racing	Toyota
88	Dale Earnhardt Jr.	Hendrick Motorsports	Chevrolet
93	Travis Kvapil	BK Racing	Toyota
95	Scott Speed	Leavine Family Racing	Ford
98	Michael McDowell	Phil Parsons Racing	Ford
99	Carl Edwards	Roush Fenway Racing	Ford
Official entry list

=== Practice and qualifying ===
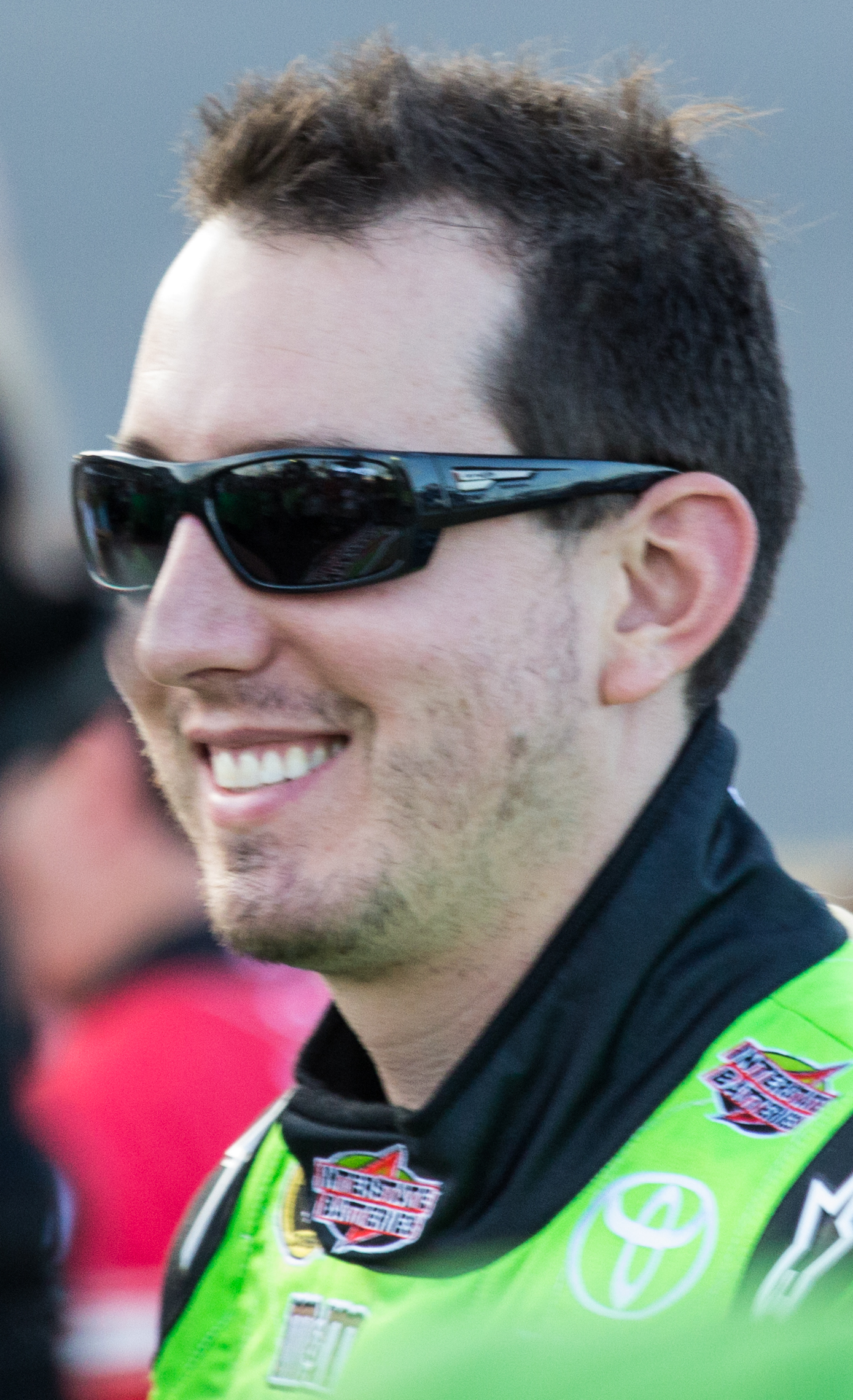
Kyle Busch won the pole position, the eleventh of his career

Three practice sessions were held before the race. The first session, held on March 15, 2013, was 90 minutes long. The second and third were held on March 16, and were both 60 minutes long. During the first practice session, Keselowski was quickest with a time of 14.869, ahead of Kenseth and Kyle Busch in second and third. Bowyer followed in the fourth position, ahead of Hamlin in fifth.

In the Saturday morning session, Busch was quickest, ahead of Kenseth and Hamlin in second and third. Jeff Burton and Kahne followed in the fourth and fifth positions. Kevin Harvick, Jeff Gordon, Jamie McMurray, Kurt Busch, and Johnson rounded out the first ten positions. Busch and Keselowski were quickest during ten consecutive laps with an average speed of 124.874 miles per hour (200.965 km/h) and 124.702 miles per hour (200.688 km/h), respectively. In the final practice session for the race, Busch remained quickest with a time of 15.372 seconds. Kahne followed in second, ahead of David Gilliland and Kenseth in third and fourth. Hamlin, who was third quickest in second practice, only managed fifth.

During qualifying, forty-four cars were entered, but only forty-three were able to start because of NASCAR's qualifying procedure. Busch clinched his eleventh career pole position, with a record-setting time of 14.813 seconds. After his qualifying run, Busch commented, “The car felt great during that lap. We’ve never really worried too much about qualifying runs. We unloaded with a really good race car and we just kept fine-tuning to make it a little bit better – and we were able to get it where it was pretty quick in practice.” He was joined on the front row of the grid by Kahne. Hamlin qualified third, Brian Vickers took fourth, and Paul Menard started fifth, after being scored fifteenth in the final practice session. McMurray, Keselowski, Tony Stewart, Martin Truex Jr., and Joey Logano completed the first ten positions on the grid. The driver that failed to qualify was Scott Riggs.

== Results ==
=== Qualifying ===
Grid	No.	Driver	Team	Manufacturer	Time	Speed
1	18	Kyle Busch	Joe Gibbs Racing	Toyota	14.813	129.535
2	5	Kasey Kahne	Hendrick Motorsports	Chevrolet	14.875	128.995
3	11	Denny Hamlin	Joe Gibbs Racing	Toyota	14.879	128.960
4	55	Brian Vickers	Michael Waltrip Racing	Toyota	14.929	128.528
5	27	Paul Menard	Richard Childress Racing	Chevrolet	14.949	128.356
6	1	Jamie McMurray	Earnhardt Ganassi Racing	Chevrolet	14.957	128.288
7	2	Brad Keselowski	Penske Racing	Ford	14.966	128.211
8	14	Tony Stewart	Stewart–Haas Racing	Chevrolet	14.990	128.005
9	56	Martin Truex Jr.	Michael Waltrip Racing	Toyota	14.997	127.946
10	22	Joey Logano	Penske Racing	Ford	15.005	127.877
11	24	Jeff Gordon	Hendrick Motorsports	Chevrolet	15.006	127.869
12	20	Matt Kenseth	Joe Gibbs Racing	Toyota	15.008	127.852
13	48	Jimmie Johnson	Hendrick Motorsports	Chevrolet	15.010	127.835
14	38	David Gilliland	Front Row Motorsports	Ford	15.015	127.792
15	13	Casey Mears	Germain Racing	Ford	15.039	127.588
16	31	Jeff Burton	Richard Childress Racing	Chevrolet	15.048	127.512
17	42	Juan Pablo Montoya	Earnhardt Ganassi Racing	Chevrolet	15.053	127.470
18	29	Kevin Harvick	Richard Childress Racing	Chevrolet	15.055	127.453
19	78	Kurt Busch	Furniture Row Racing	Chevrolet	15.062	127.393
20	43	Aric Almirola	Richard Petty Motorsports	Ford	15.064	127.377
21	99	Carl Edwards	Roush Fenway Racing	Ford	15.066	127.360
22	9	Marcos Ambrose	Richard Petty Motorsports	Ford	15.066	127.360
23	15	Clint Bowyer	Michael Waltrip Racing	Toyota	15.073	127.300
24	16	Greg Biffle	Roush Fenway Racing	Ford	15.078	127.258
25	83	David Reutimann	BK Racing	Toyota	15.093	127.132
26	30	David Stremme	Swan Racing	Toyota	15.157	126.595
27	95	Scott Speed	Leavine Family Racing	Ford	15.159	126.578
28	17	Ricky Stenhouse Jr.	Roush Fenway Racing	Ford	15.165	126.528
29	51	A. J. Allmendinger	Phoenix Racing	Chevrolet	15.178	126.420
30	34	David Ragan	Front Row Motorsports	Ford	15.180	126.403
31	39	Ryan Newman	Stewart–Haas Racing	Chevrolet	15.200	126.237
32	88	Dale Earnhardt Jr.	Hendrick Motorsports	Chevrolet	15.235	125.947
33	7	Dave Blaney	Tommy Baldwin Racing	Chevrolet	15.247	125.848
34	98	Michael McDowell	Phil Parsons Racing	Ford	15.260	125.740
35	36	J. J. Yeley	Tommy Baldwin Racing	Chevrolet	15.261	125.732
36	19	Mike Bliss	Humphrey Smith Racing	Toyota	15.264	125.708
37	93	Travis Kvapil	BK Racing	Toyota	15.333	125.142
38	87	Joe Nemechek	NEMCO-Jay Robinson Racing	Toyota	15.363	124.897
39	47	Bobby Labonte	JTG Daugherty Racing	Toyota	15.382	124.743
40	35	Josh Wise	Front Row Motorsports	Ford	15.386	124.711
41	10	Danica Patrick	Stewart–Haas Racing	Chevrolet	15.395	124.638
42	33	Landon Cassill	Circle Sport	Chevrolet	15.427	124.379
43	32	Terry Labonte	FAS Lane Racing	Ford	15.560	123.316
Failed to Qualify
	44	Scott Riggs	Xxxtreme Motorsport	Ford	15.418	124.452

=== Race results ===
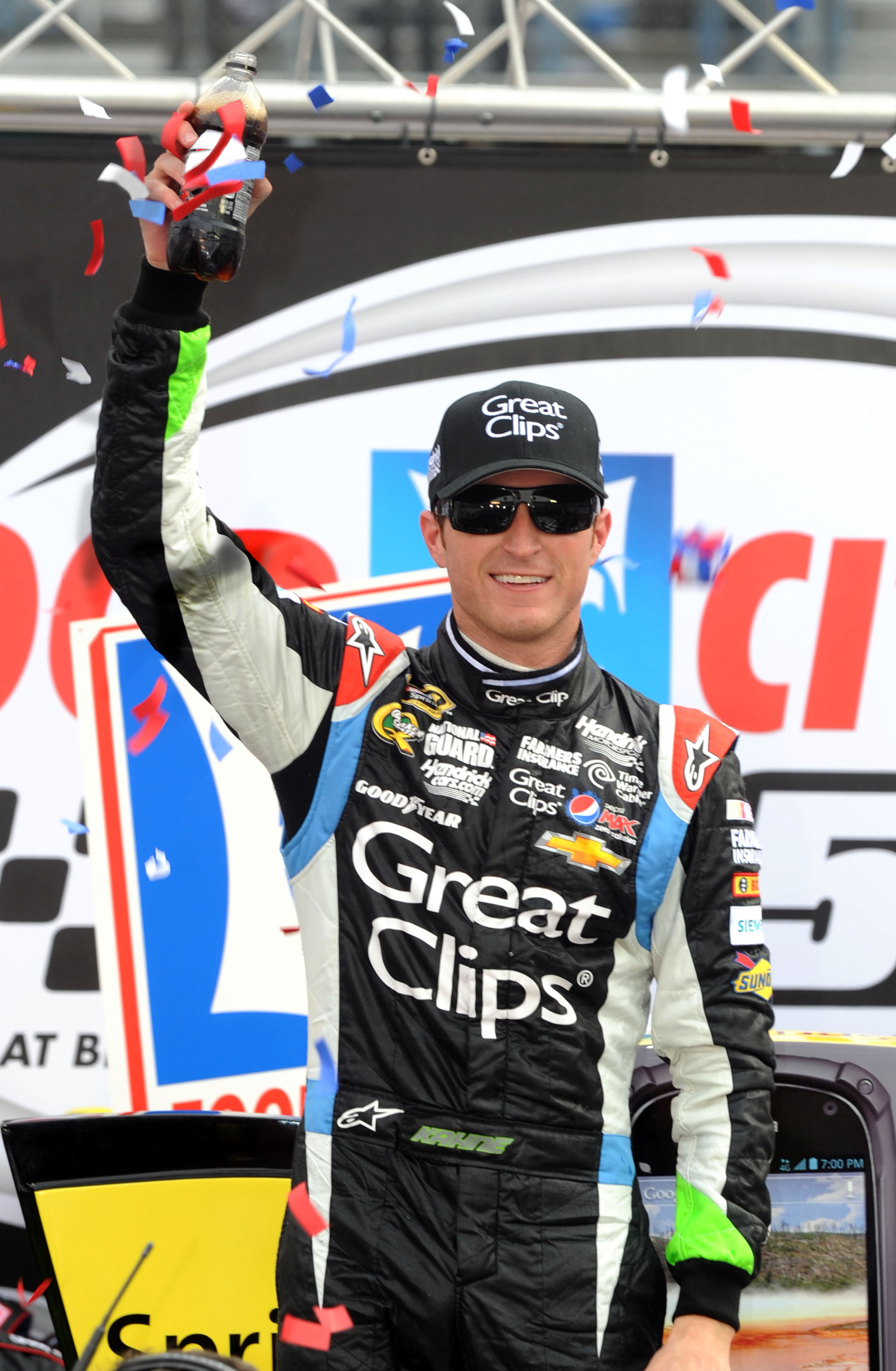
Kasey Kahne won the race.

Pos	Car	Driver	Team	Manufacturer	Laps	Points
1	5	Kasey Kahne	Hendrick Motorsports	Chevrolet	500	47
2	18	Kyle Busch	Joe Gibbs Racing	Toyota	500	43
3	2	Brad Keselowski	Penske Racing	Ford	500	42
4	78	Kurt Busch	Furniture Row Racing	Chevrolet	500	41
5	15	Clint Bowyer	Michael Waltrip Racing	Toyota	500	39
6	88	Dale Earnhardt Jr.	Hendrick Motorsports	Chevrolet	500	38
7	39	Ryan Newman	Stewart–Haas Racing	Chevrolet	500	37
8	55	Brian Vickers	Michael Waltrip Racing	Toyota	500	–
9	27	Paul Menard	Richard Childress Racing	Chevrolet	500	35
10	1	Jamie McMurray	Earnhardt Ganassi Racing	Chevrolet	500	34
11	16	Greg Biffle	Roush Fenway Racing	Ford	500	33
12	56	Martin Truex Jr.	Michael Waltrip Racing	Toyota	500	32
13	51	A. J. Allmendinger	Phoenix Racing	Chevrolet	500	31
14	29	Kevin Harvick	Richard Childress Racing	Chevrolet	500	30
15	13	Casey Mears	Germain Racing	Ford	500	29
16	17	Ricky Stenhouse Jr.	Roush Fenway Racing	Ford	500	28
17	22	Joey Logano	Penske Racing	Ford	500	28
18	99	Carl Edwards	Roush Fenway Racing	Ford	499	26
19	9	Marcos Ambrose	Richard Petty Motorsports	Ford	499	25
20	30	David Stremme	Swan Racing	Toyota	498	24
21	34	David Ragan	Front Row Motorsports	Ford	498	24
22	48	Jimmie Johnson	Hendrick Motorsports	Chevrolet	498	22
23	11	Denny Hamlin	Joe Gibbs Racing	Toyota	498	21
24	38	David Gilliland	Front Row Motorsports	Ford	496	20
25	32	Terry Labonte	FAS Lane Racing	Ford	496	19
26	35	Josh Wise	Front Row Motorsports	Ford	496	–
27	36	J. J. Yeley	Tommy Baldwin Racing	Chevrolet	495	17
28	10	Danica Patrick	Stewart–Haas Racing	Chevrolet	495	16
29	87	Joe Nemechek	NEMCO-Jay Robinson Racing	Toyota	490	–
30	42	Juan Pablo Montoya	Earnhardt Ganassi Racing	Chevrolet	487	14
31	14	Tony Stewart	Stewart–Haas Racing	Chevrolet	464	13
32	31	Jeff Burton	Richard Childress Racing	Chevrolet	458	12
33	33	Landon Cassill	Circle Sport	Chevrolet	410	11
34	24	Jeff Gordon	Hendrick Motorsports	Chevrolet	390	11
35	20	Matt Kenseth	Joe Gibbs Racing	Toyota	390	10
36	7	Dave Blaney	Tommy Baldwin Racing	Chevrolet	321	8
37	43	Aric Almirola	Richard Petty Motorsports	Ford	245	7
38	93	Travis Kvapil	BK Racing	Toyota	234	6
39	83	David Reutimann	BK Racing	Toyota	184	5
40	95	Scott Speed	Leavine Family Racing	Ford	184	4
41	47	Bobby Labonte	JTG Daugherty Racing	Toyota	159	3
42	98	Michael McDowell	Phil Parsons Racing	Ford	26	2
43	19	Mike Bliss	Humphrey Smith Racing	Toyota	3	–

== Standings after the race ==
Drivers' Championship standings

	Pos	Driver	Points
1	1	Brad Keselowski	171
1	2	Dale Earnhardt Jr.	157
2	3	Jimmie Johnson	151
5	4	Clint Bowyer	128
3	5	Greg Biffle	126

Manufacturers' Championship standings

Pos	Manufacturer	Points
1	Chevrolet	29
2	Toyota	25 (-4)
3	Ford	22 (-7)

- Note: Only the first twelve positions are included for the driver standings.

Previous race: 2013 Kobalt Tools 400	Sprint Cup Series; 2013 season	Next race: 2013 Auto Club 400
