= 2013 Kobalt Tools 400 =

Race details
- Race 3 of 36 in the 2013 NASCAR Sprint Cup Series
- Date: March 10, 2013
- Location: Las Vegas Motor Speedway in Clark County, Nevada
- Course: Permanent racing facility
- Course length: 1.5 miles (2.4 km)
- Distance: 267 laps, 400.5 mi (644.542 km)
- Weather: Temperatures reaching up to 68 °F (20 °C); wind speeds up to 12 miles per hour (19 km/h)
- Average speed: 146.287 mph (235.426 km/h)

Pole position
| Driver | Brad Keselowski | Penske Racing |
- Time: 2012 Owner's Points

Most laps led
| Driver | Kasey Kahne | Hendrick Motorsports |
- Laps: 114

Winner
| No. 20 | Matt Kenseth | Joe Gibbs Racing |

Television in the United States
- Network: Fox
- Announcers: Mike Joy, Darrell Waltrip, and Larry McReynolds
- Nielsen ratings: 4.4/10

The 2013 Kobalt Tools 400 was a NASCAR Sprint Cup Series stock car race held on March 10, 2013, at Las Vegas Motor Speedway in Clark County, Nevada. Contested over 267 laps on the 1.5 mile (2.4 km) asphalt tri-oval, it was the third race of the 2013 Sprint Cup Series championship. Matt Kenseth of Joe Gibbs Racing won the race, his first of the season. Kasey Kahne finished second while Brad Keselowski, Kyle Busch and Carl Edwards rounded out the top five.

The win was Kenseth's first win driving for Joe Gibbs Racing. He also became the third driver to win a Sprint Cup race on his birthday.

== Report ==
=== Background ===
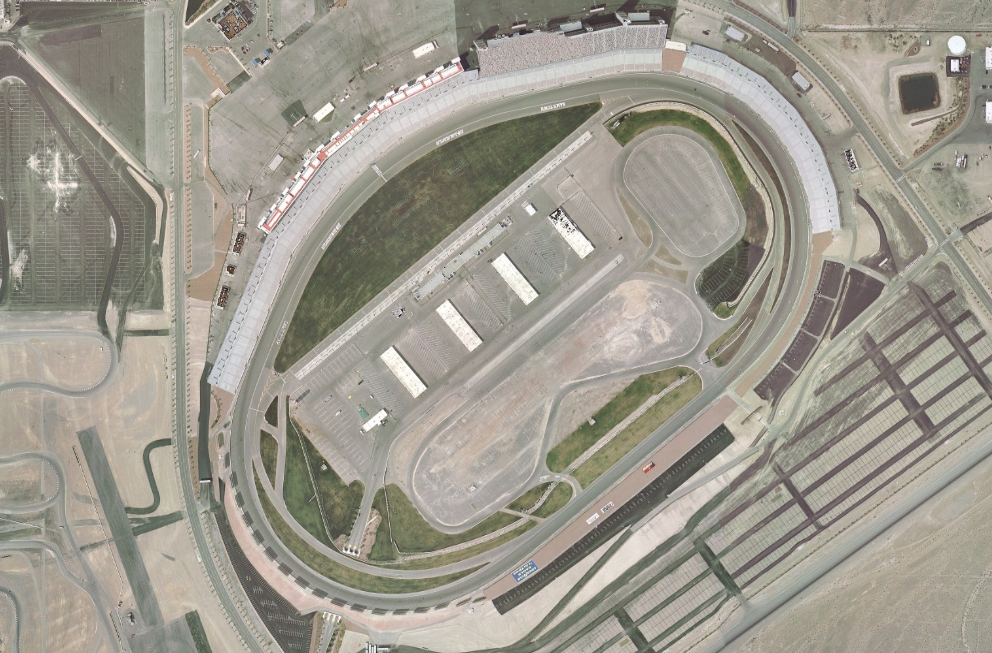
Las Vegas Motor Speedway, the race track where the race was held

Las Vegas Motor Speedway is a four-turn, 1.5 miles (2.4 km) D-shaped oval track that has sanctioned NASCAR Sprint Cup Series events since 1996. After being reconfigured in 2007, the track has a 20° banking in each of the turns, while the rounded front stretch and the back straightaway has a 9° banking. The front stretch, the location of the finish line, is 2,275 feet (693 m) long, 703 feet (214 m) longer than the back straightaway. Las Vegas Motor Speedway also has a grandstand seating capacity of 138,000 people. The defending winner of the 267 lap, 400.5 mile (644.5 km) race was Tony Stewart, who won the race in 2012.

Before the race, Jimmie Johnson was leading the Drivers' Championship with 90 points, while Dale Earnhardt Jr. and Brad Keselowski stood in second and third with 82 points each. Denny Hamlin and Clint Bowyer followed in fourth and fifth with 72 points each, and was six ahead of Greg Biffle in sixth. Mark Martin with 65 was five points ahead of Jeff Gordon, Ricky Stenhouse Jr., and Aric Almirola, as Carl Edwards with 59 points was seven ahead of Marcos Ambrose. In the Manufacturers' Championship, Chevrolet and Ford were leading with fourteen points, four points ahead of their rival Toyota.

=== Entry list ===
(R) - Denotes rookie driver

(i) - Denotes driver who is ineligible for series points

| No. | Driver | Team | Manufacturer |
|---|---|---|---|
| 1 | Jamie McMurray | Earnhardt Ganassi Racing | Chevrolet |
| 2 | Brad Keselowski | Penske Racing | Ford |
| 5 | Kasey Kahne | Hendrick Motorsports | Chevrolet |
| 7 | Dave Blaney | Tommy Baldwin Racing | Chevrolet |
| 9 | Marcos Ambrose | Richard Petty Motorsports | Ford |
| 10 | Danica Patrick (R) | Stewart–Haas Racing | Chevrolet |
| 11 | Denny Hamlin | Joe Gibbs Racing | Toyota |
| 13 | Casey Mears | Germain Racing | Ford |
| 14 | Tony Stewart | Stewart–Haas Racing | Chevrolet |
| 15 | Clint Bowyer | Michael Waltrip Racing | Toyota |
| 16 | Greg Biffle | Roush Fenway Racing | Ford |
| 17 | Ricky Stenhouse Jr. (R) | Roush Fenway Racing | Ford |
| 18 | Kyle Busch | Joe Gibbs Racing | Toyota |
| 19 | Mike Bliss (i) | Humphrey Smith Racing | Toyota |
| 20 | Matt Kenseth | Joe Gibbs Racing | Toyota |
| 21 | Trevor Bayne (i) | Wood Brothers Racing | Ford |
| 22 | Joey Logano | Penske Racing | Ford |
| 24 | Jeff Gordon | Hendrick Motorsports | Chevrolet |
| 27 | Paul Menard | Richard Childress Racing | Chevrolet |
| 29 | Kevin Harvick | Richard Childress Racing | Chevrolet |
| 30 | David Stremme | Swan Racing | Toyota |
| 31 | Jeff Burton | Richard Childress Racing | Chevrolet |
| 32 | Ken Schrader | FAS Lane Racing | Ford |
| 33 | Landon Cassill (i) | Circle Sport | Chevrolet |
| 34 | David Ragan | Front Row Motorsports | Ford |
| 35 | Josh Wise (i) | Front Row Motorsports | Ford |
| 36 | J. J. Yeley | Tommy Baldwin Racing | Chevrolet |
| 38 | David Gilliland | Front Row Motorsports | Ford |
| 39 | Ryan Newman | Stewart–Haas Racing | Chevrolet |
| 42 | Juan Pablo Montoya | Earnhardt Ganassi Racing | Chevrolet |
| 43 | Aric Almirola | Richard Petty Motorsports | Ford |
| 47 | Bobby Labonte | JTG Daugherty Racing | Toyota |
| 48 | Jimmie Johnson | Hendrick Motorsports | Chevrolet |
| 51 | Austin Dillon (i) | Phoenix Racing | Chevrolet |
| 55 | Mark Martin | Michael Waltrip Racing | Toyota |
| 56 | Martin Truex Jr. | Michael Waltrip Racing | Toyota |
| 78 | Kurt Busch | Furniture Row Racing | Chevrolet |
| 83 | David Reutimann | BK Racing | Toyota |
| 87 | Joe Nemechek | NEMCO-Jay Robinson Racing | Toyota |
| 88 | Dale Earnhardt Jr. | Hendrick Motorsports | Chevrolet |
| 93 | Travis Kvapil | BK Racing | Toyota |
| 95 | Scott Speed | Leavine Family Racing | Ford |
| 98 | Michael McDowell | Phil Parsons Racing | Ford |
| 99 | Carl Edwards | Roush Fenway Racing | Ford |

=== Practice and qualifying ===
As a result of Friday afternoon rain, qualifying was canceled for the first time in track history. With the field being set by the previous year's points standings, Brad Keselowski was awarded the pole position. Mike Bliss was the only driver not to qualify.

=== Race ===
The Race was held on March 10, 2013.

== Results ==
=== Qualifying ===
| Grid | No. | Driver | Team | Manufacturer |
|---|---|---|---|---|
| 1 | 2 | Brad Keselowski | Penske Racing | Ford |
| 2 | 15 | Clint Bowyer | Michael Waltrip Racing | Toyota |
| 3 | 48 | Jimmie Johnson | Hendrick Motorsports | Chevrolet |
| 4 | 5 | Kasey Kahne | Hendrick Motorsports | Chevrolet |
| 5 | 16 | Greg Biffle | Roush Fenway Racing | Ford |
| 6 | 11 | Denny Hamlin | Joe Gibbs Racing | Toyota |
| 7 | 17 | ^{1} Ricky Stenhouse Jr. | Roush Fenway Racing | Ford |
| 8 | 29 | Kevin Harvick | Richard Childress Racing | Chevrolet |
| 9 | 14 | Tony Stewart | Stewart–Haas Racing | Chevrolet |
| 10 | 24 | Jeff Gordon | Hendrick Motorsports | Chevrolet |
| 11 | 56 | Martin Truex Jr. | Michael Waltrip Racing | Toyota |
| 12 | 88 | Dale Earnhardt Jr. | Hendrick Motorsports | Chevrolet |
| 13 | 18 | Kyle Busch | Joe Gibbs Racing | Toyota |
| 14 | 39 | Ryan Newman | Stewart–Haas Racing | Chevrolet |
| 15 | 55 | Mark Martin | Michael Waltrip Racing | Toyota |
| 16 | 99 | Carl Edwards | Roush Fenway Racing | Ford |
| 17 | 27 | Paul Menard | Richard Childress Racing | Chevrolet |
| 18 | 20 | Matt Kenseth | Joe Gibbs Racing | Toyota |
| 19 | 9 | Marcos Ambrose | Richard Petty Motorsports | Ford |
| 20 | 31 | Jeff Burton | Richard Childress Racing | Chevrolet |
| 21 | 22 | Joey Logano | Penske Racing | Ford |
| 22 | 43 | Aric Almirola | Richard Petty Motorsports | Ford |
| 23 | 1 | Jamie McMurray | Earnhardt Ganassi Racing | Chevrolet |
| 24 | 78 | Kurt Busch | Furniture Row Racing | Chevrolet |
| 25 | 42 | Juan Pablo Montoya | Earnhardt Ganassi Racing | Chevrolet |
| 26 | 47 | Bobby Labonte | JTG Daugherty Racing | Toyota |
| 27 | 51 | Austin Dillon | Phoenix Racing | Chevrolet |
| 28 | 93 | Travis Kvapil | BK Racing | Toyota |
| 29 | 34 | David Ragan | Front Row Motorsports | Ford |
| 30 | 13 | Casey Mears | Germain Racing | Ford |
| 31 | 38 | David Gilliland | Front Row Motorsports | Ford |
| 32 | 83 | David Reutimann | BK Racing | Toyota |
| 33 | 7 | Dave Blaney | Tommy Baldwin Racing | Chevrolet |
| 34 | 32 | Ken Schrader | FAS Lane Racing | Ford |
| 35 | 36 | J. J. Yeley | Tommy Baldwin Racing | Chevrolet |
| 36 | 21 | Trevor Bayne | Wood Brothers Racing | Ford |
| 37 | 10 | ^{1} Danica Patrick | Stewart–Haas Racing | Chevrolet |
| 38 | 30 | David Stremme | Swan Racing Company | Toyota |
| 39 | 98 | Michael McDowell | Phil Parsons Racing | Ford |
| 40 | 95 | Scott Speed | Leavine Family Racing | Ford |
| 41 | 33 | Landon Cassill | Circle Sport | Chevrolet |
| 42 | 87 | Joe Nemechek | NEMCO-Jay Robinson Racing | Toyota |
| 43 | 35 | Josh Wise | Front Row Motorsports | Ford |
Failed to Qualify
| 44 | 19 | Mike Bliss | Humphrey Smith Racing | Toyota |
^{1} –Rookie of the Year candidate Source:

=== Race results ===
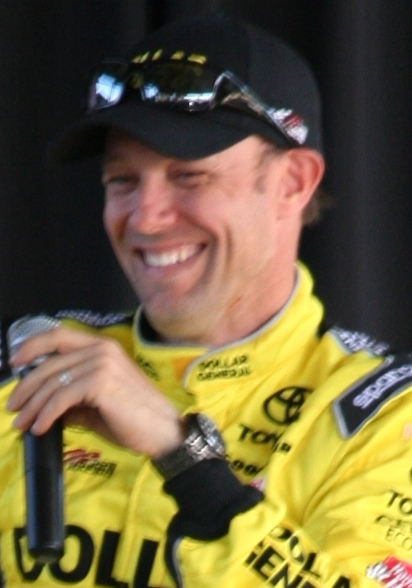
Matt Kenseth won the race, his first with Joe Gibbs Racing.

| Pos | Car | Driver | Team | Manufacturer | Laps | Points |
|---|---|---|---|---|---|---|
| 1 | 20 | Matt Kenseth | Joe Gibbs Racing | Toyota | 267 | 47 |
| 2 | 5 | Kasey Kahne | Hendrick Motorsports | Chevrolet | 267 | 43 |
| 3 | 2 | Brad Keselowski | Penske Racing | Ford | 267 | 42 |
| 4 | 18 | Kyle Busch | Joe Gibbs Racing | Toyota | 267 | 41 |
| 5 | 99 | Carl Edwards | Roush Fenway Racing | Ford | 267 | 39 |
| 6 | 48 | Jimmie Johnson | Hendrick Motorsports | Chevrolet | 267 | 39 |
| 7 | 88 | Dale Earnhardt Jr. | Hendrick Motorsports | Chevrolet | 267 | 37 |
| 8 | 56 | Martin Truex Jr. | Michael Waltrip Racing | Toyota | 267 | 36 |
| 9 | 29 | Kevin Harvick | Richard Childress Racing | Chevrolet | 267 | 35 |
| 10 | 27 | Paul Menard | Richard Childress Racing | Chevrolet | 267 | 34 |
| 11 | 14 | Tony Stewart | Stewart–Haas Racing | Chevrolet | 267 | 33 |
| 12 | 22 | Joey Logano | Penske Racing | Ford | 267 | 32 |
| 13 | 1 | Jamie McMurray | Earnhardt Ganassi Racing | Chevrolet | 267 | 32 |
| 14 | 55 | Mark Martin | Michael Waltrip Racing | Toyota | 267 | 30 |
| 15 | 11 | Denny Hamlin | Joe Gibbs Racing | Toyota | 267 | 30 |
| 16 | 43 | Aric Almirola | Richard Petty Motorsports | Ford | 267 | 28 |
| 17 | 16 | Greg Biffle | Roush Fenway Racing | Ford | 267 | 27 |
| 18 | 17 | Ricky Stenhouse Jr. | Roush Fenway Racing | Ford | 267 | 27 |
| 19 | 42 | Juan Pablo Montoya | Earnhardt Ganassi Racing | Chevrolet | 267 | 25 |
| 20 | 78 | Kurt Busch | Furniture Row Racing | Chevrolet | 266 | 24 |
| 21 | 51 | Austin Dillon | Phoenix Racing | Chevrolet | 266 | – |
| 22 | 9 | Marcos Ambrose | Richard Petty Motorsports | Ford | 266 | 22 |
| 23 | 21 | Trevor Bayne | Wood Brothers Racing | Ford | 266 | – |
| 24 | 7 | Dave Blaney | Tommy Baldwin Racing | Chevrolet | 266 | 20 |
| 25 | 24 | Jeff Gordon | Hendrick Motorsports | Chevrolet | 266 | 19 |
| 26 | 31 | Jeff Burton | Richard Childress Racing | Chevrolet | 266 | 18 |
| 27 | 15 | Clint Bowyer | Michael Waltrip Racing | Toyota | 265 | 17 |
| 28 | 38 | David Gilliland | Front Row Motorsports | Ford | 265 | 16 |
| 29 | 13 | Casey Mears | Germain Racing | Ford | 265 | 15 |
| 30 | 47 | Bobby Labonte | JTG Daugherty Racing | Toyota | 263 | 14 |
| 31 | 34 | David Ragan | Front Row Motorsports | Ford | 263 | 13 |
| 32 | 30 | David Stremme | Swan Racing | Toyota | 261 | 12 |
| 33 | 10 | Danica Patrick | Stewart–Haas Racing | Chevrolet | 261 | 11 |
| 34 | 83 | David Reutimann | BK Racing | Toyota | 261 | 10 |
| 35 | 35 | Josh Wise | Front Row Motorsports | Ford | 260 | – |
| 36 | 36 | J. J. Yeley | Tommy Baldwin Racing | Chevrolet | 259 | 8 |
| 37 | 32 | Ken Schrader | FAS Lane Racing | Ford | 258 | 7 |
| 38 | 39 | Ryan Newman | Stewart–Haas Racing | Chevrolet | 234 | 6 |
| 39 | 93 | Travis Kvapil | BK Racing | Toyota | 217 | 5 |
| 40 | 87 | Joe Nemechek | NEMCO-Jay Robinson Racing | Toyota | 216 | – |
| 41 | 95 | Scott Speed | Leavine Family Racing | Ford | 143 | 3 |
| 42 | 33 | Landon Cassill | Circle Sport | Chevrolet | 66 | 2 |
| 43 | 98 | Michael McDowell | Phil Parsons Racing | Ford | 21 | 1 |

== Standings after the race ==
Drivers' Championship standings

| | Pos | Driver | Points |
|---|---|---|---|
| | 1 | Jimmie Johnson | 129 |
| 1 | 2 | Brad Keselowski | 124 (−5) |
| 1 | 3 | Dale Earnhardt Jr. | 119 (−10) |
| | 4 | Denny Hamlin | 102 (−27) |
| 6 | 5 | Carl Edwards | 98 (−31) |

Manufacturers' Championship standings

| | Pos | Manufacturer | Points |
|---|---|---|---|
| | 1 | Chevrolet | 20 |
| 1 | 2 | Toyota | 19 (−1) |
| 1 | 3 | Ford | 18 (−2) |

- Note: Only the first twelve positions are included for the driver standings.

| Previous race: 2013 Subway Fresh Fit 500 | Sprint Cup Series; 2013 season | Next race: 2013 Food City 500 |
