= 2013 Subway Fresh Fit 500 =

Car race

Race details
- Race 2 of 36 in the 2013 NASCAR Sprint Cup Series
- Map of the Phoenix International Raceway (2011–2018)
- Date: March 3, 2013
- Location: Phoenix International Raceway in Avondale, Arizona
- Course: Permanent racing facility
- Course length: 1.0 miles (1.6 km)
- Distance: 316 laps, 316 mi (508.553 km)
- Weather: Clear; temperature around 82 °F (28 °C); wind out of the SE at 9 miles per hour (14 km/h).

Pole position
| Driver | Mark Martin | Michael Waltrip Racing |
- Time: 26.073 seconds

Most laps led
| Driver | Carl Edwards | Roush-Fenway Racing |
- Laps: 122

Winner
| No. 99 | Carl Edwards | Roush Fenway Racing |

Television in the United States
- Network: Fox
- Announcers: Mike Joy, Darrell Waltrip, and Larry McReynolds
- Nielsen ratings: 5.3/11 (9.117 million viewers)

The 2013 Subway Fresh Fit 500 was a NASCAR Sprint Cup Series stock car race held on March 3, 2013, at Phoenix International Raceway in Avondale, Arizona. Contested over 316 laps on the 1-mile (1.6 km) asphalt tri-oval, it was the second race of the 2013 Sprint Cup Series championship. Carl Edwards of Roush Fenway Racing won the race, his first win in 70 races. Jimmie Johnson finished second while Denny Hamlin, Brad Keselowski and Dale Earnhardt Jr. rounded out the top five.

== Report ==
=== Background ===
Phoenix International Raceway is one of five short tracks to hold NASCAR races; the others are Richmond International Raceway, Dover International Speedway, Bristol Motor Speedway, and Martinsville Speedway. The standard track at Phoenix International Raceway is a four-turn short track oval that is 1 mile (1.6 km) long. The track's first two turns are banked from 10 to 11 degrees, while the third and fourth turns have an 8–9 degree banking. The front stretch, the location of the finish line, is banked at 3 degrees, and the back stretch has a 10–11 degree banking. The racetrack has seats for 55,000 spectators.

Before the race, Jimmie Johnson was leading the Drivers' Championship with 47 points, and Dale Earnhardt Jr. stood in second with 42 points. Mark Martin and Brad Keselowski followed in third and fourth with 41 points each, and was one ahead of Ryan Newman in fifth. Greg Biffle with 38 was one point ahead of Danica Patrick, as Michael McDowell with 35 points was one ahead of J. J. Yeley and Clint Bowyer. In the Manufacturers' Championship, Chevrolet was leading with nine points, three points ahead of their rival Toyota. Ford was in the third position with four points. Denny Hamlin was the race's defending winner.

The race was the first of the season to remove roof cameras to lessen turbulent air impact, and would be removed for two-thirds of the points races.

=== Entry list ===
| No. | Driver | Team | Manufacturer |
|---|---|---|---|
| 1 | Jamie McMurray | Earnhardt Ganassi Racing | Chevrolet |
| 2 | Brad Keselowski | Penske Racing | Ford |
| 5 | Kasey Kahne | Hendrick Motorsports | Chevrolet |
| 7 | Dave Blaney | Tommy Baldwin Racing | Chevrolet |
| 9 | Marcos Ambrose | Richard Petty Motorsports | Ford |
| 10 | Danica Patrick (R) | Stewart–Haas Racing | Chevrolet |
| 11 | Denny Hamlin | Joe Gibbs Racing | Toyota |
| 13 | Casey Mears | Germain Racing | Ford |
| 14 | Tony Stewart | Stewart–Haas Racing | Chevrolet |
| 15 | Clint Bowyer | Michael Waltrip Racing | Toyota |
| 16 | Greg Biffle | Roush Fenway Racing | Ford |
| 17 | Ricky Stenhouse Jr. (R) | Roush Fenway Racing | Ford |
| 18 | Kyle Busch | Joe Gibbs Racing | Toyota |
| 19 | Mike Bliss (i) | Humphery Smith Racing | Toyota |
| 20 | Matt Kenseth | Joe Gibbs Racing | Toyota |
| 22 | Joey Logano | Penske Racing | Ford |
| 24 | Jeff Gordon | Hendrick Motorsports | Chevrolet |
| 27 | Paul Menard | Richard Childress Racing | Chevrolet |
| 29 | Kevin Harvick | Richard Childress Racing | Chevrolet |
| 30 | David Stremme | Swan Racing | Toyota |
| 31 | Jeff Burton | Richard Childress Racing | Chevrolet |
| 32 | Ken Schrader | FAS Lane Racing | Ford |
| 33 | Landon Cassill (i) | Circle Sport | Chevrolet |
| 34 | David Ragan | Front Row Motorsports | Ford |
| 35 | Josh Wise (i) | Front Row Motorsports | Ford |
| 36 | J. J. Yeley | Tommy Baldwin Racing | Chevrolet |
| 38 | David Gilliland | Front Row Motorsports | Ford |
| 39 | Ryan Newman | Stewart–Haas Racing | Chevrolet |
| 42 | Juan Pablo Montoya | Earnhardt Ganassi Racing | Chevrolet |
| 43 | Aric Almirola | Richard Petty Motorsports | Ford |
| 44 | Scott Riggs | Xxxtreme Motorsports | Chevrolet |
| 47 | Bobby Labonte | JTG Daugherty Racing | Toyota |
| 48 | Jimmie Johnson | Hendrick Motorsports | Chevrolet |
| 51 | A. J. Allmendinger | Phoenix Racing | Chevrolet |
| 55 | Mark Martin | Michael Waltrip Racing | Toyota |
| 56 | Martin Truex Jr. | Michael Waltrip Racing | Toyota |
| 78 | Kurt Busch | Furniture Row Racing | Chevrolet |
| 83 | David Reutimann | BK Racing | Toyota |
| 87 | Joe Nemechek | NEMCO-Jay Robinson Racing | Toyota |
| 88 | Dale Earnhardt Jr. | Hendrick Motorsports | Chevrolet |
| 93 | Travis Kvapil | BK Racing | Toyota |
| 95 | Scott Speed | Leavine Family Racing | Ford |
| 98 | Michael McDowell | Phil Parsons Racing | Ford |
| 99 | Carl Edwards | Roush Fenway Racing | Ford |

=== Practice and qualifying ===
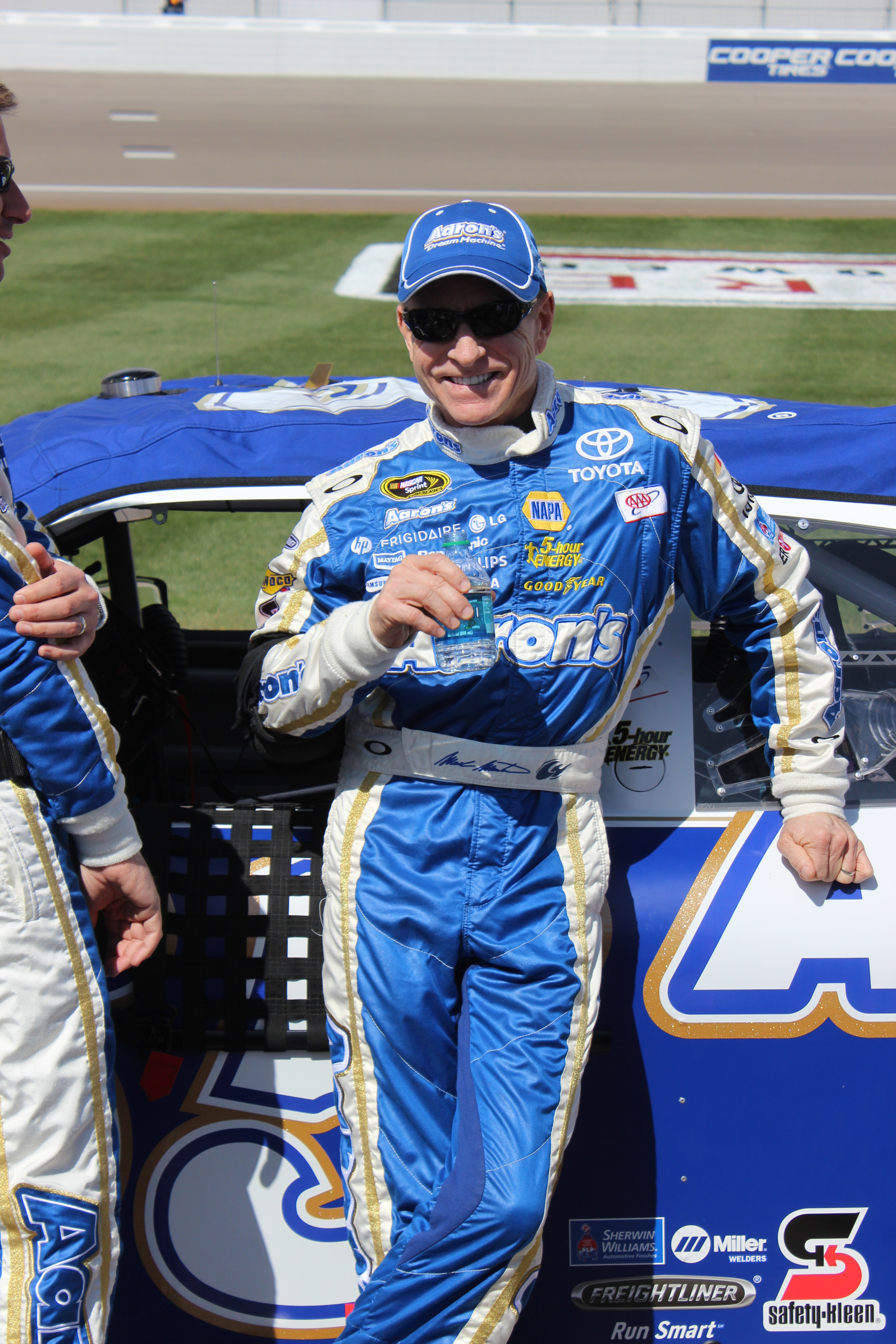
Mark Martin won the pole position

Three practice sessions were held before the race on March 1 and March 2, 2013. The first session lasted 85 minutes long, while the second was 55 minutes long. The third session lasted for 50 minutes. Matt Kenseth was quickest with a speed of 137.023 miles per hour (220.517 km/h) in the first session, 0.047 miles per hour (0.076 km/h) faster than Kyle Busch. Martin was just off Kyle Busch's pace, followed by Hamlin, Carl Edwards, and Johnson. The session was paused temporarily after debris prompted a caution.

Forty-three cars were entered for the qualifying session held on March 1. Martin clinched his fifty-sixth pole position of his career, with a time of 26.073 seconds, which was a new race record. He was joined on the front row of the grid by Kasey Kahne. Johnson qualified third, Kyle Busch took fourth, and Gordon started fifth. Tony Stewart, Kevin Harvick, Hamlin, Kenseth, and Newman rounded out the first ten positions.

=== Post-race ===
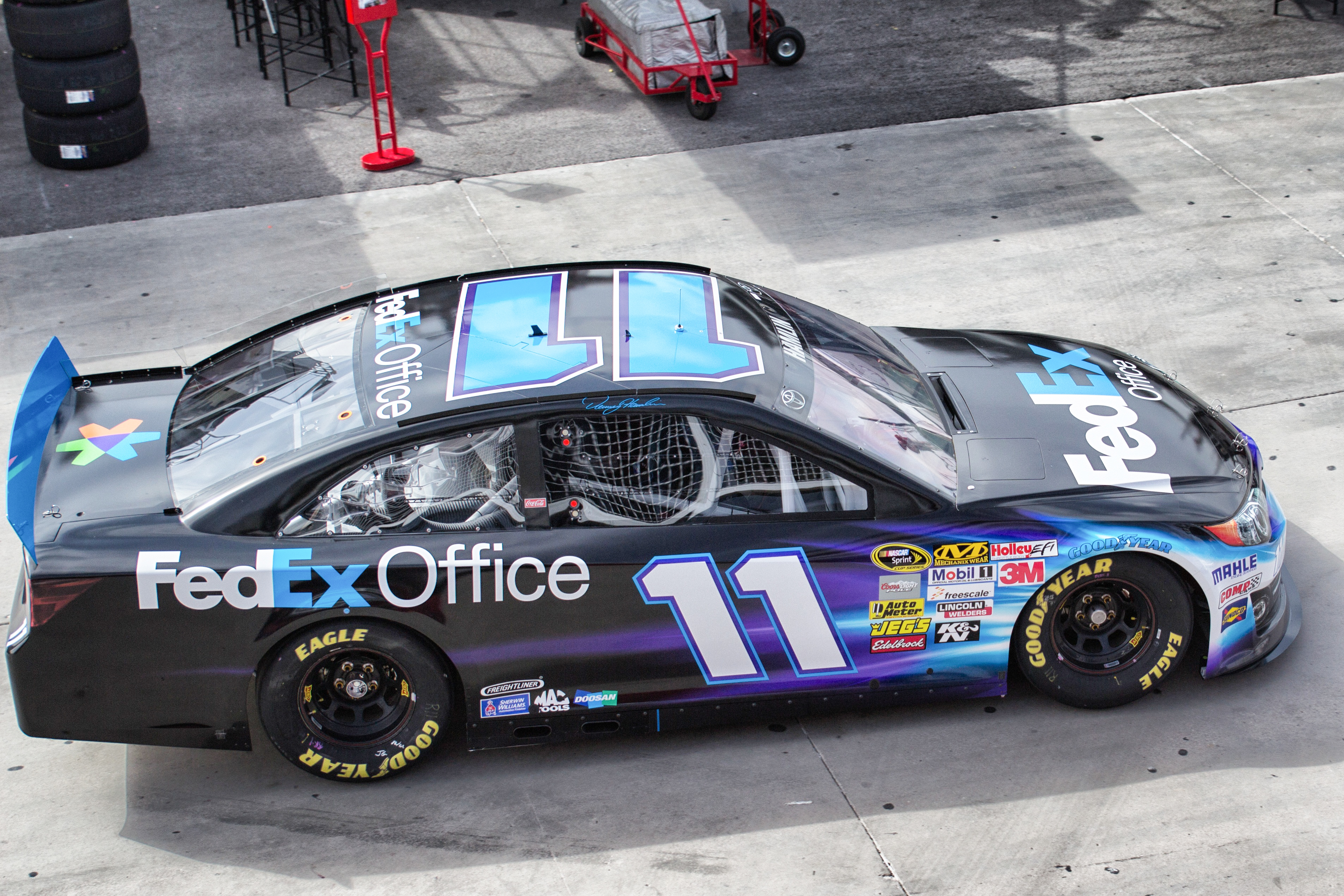
Denny Hamlin's 2013 Gen 6 car. Hamlin was fined $25,000 for criticizing the car.

On March 7, NASCAR fined Denny Hamlin $25,000 for saying that the then-new Gen 6 cars did not race as well as the Car of Tomorrow, citing difficulty passing. Because Hamlin publicly refused to pay the fine, NASCAR instead took $25,000 off his race winnings instead.

== Results ==
=== Qualifying ===
| Grid | No. | Driver | Team | Manufacturer | Time | Speed |
|---|---|---|---|---|---|---|
| 1 | 55 | Mark Martin | Michael Waltrip Racing | Toyota | 26.073 | 138.074 |
| 2 | 5 | Kasey Kahne | Hendrick Motorsports | Chevrolet | 26.113 | 137.862 |
| 3 | 48 | Jimmie Johnson | Hendrick Motorsports | Chevrolet | 26.124 | 137.804 |
| 4 | 18 | Kyle Busch | Joe Gibbs Racing | Toyota | 26.149 | 137.673 |
| 5 | 24 | Jeff Gordon | Hendrick Motorsports | Chevrolet | 26.246 | 137.164 |
| 6 | 14 | Tony Stewart | Stewart–Haas Racing | Chevrolet | 26.250 | 137.143 |
| 7 | 29 | Kevin Harvick | Richard Childress Racing | Chevrolet | 26.263 | 137.075 |
| 8 | 11 | Denny Hamlin | Joe Gibbs Racing | Toyota | 26.292 | 136.924 |
| 9 | 20 | Matt Kenseth | Joe Gibbs Racing | Toyota | 26.300 | 136.882 |
| 10 | 39 | Ryan Newman | Stewart–Haas Racing | Chevrolet | 26.304 | 136.861 |
| 11 | 2 | Brad Keselowski | Penske Racing | Ford | 26.309 | 136.835 |
| 12 | 17 | Ricky Stenhouse Jr. | Roush Fenway Racing | Ford | 26.329 | 136.731 |
| 13 | 15 | Clint Bowyer | Michael Waltrip Racing | Toyota | 26.344 | 136.654 |
| 14 | 56 | Martin Truex Jr. | Michael Waltrip Racing | Toyota | 26.354 | 136.602 |
| 15 | 99 | Carl Edwards | Roush Fenway Racing | Ford | 26.377 | 136.483 |
| 16 | 27 | Paul Menard | Richard Childress Racing | Chevrolet | 26.400 | 136.364 |
| 17 | 16 | Greg Biffle | Roush Fenway Racing | Ford | 26.414 | 136.291 |
| 18 | 43 | Aric Almirola | Richard Petty Motorsports | Ford | 26.419 | 136.266 |
| 19 | 1 | Jamie McMurray | Earnhardt Ganassi Racing | Chevrolet | 26.483 | 135.936 |
| 20 | 31 | Jeff Burton | Richard Childress Racing | Chevrolet | 26.492 | 135.890 |
| 21 | 88 | Dale Earnhardt Jr. | Hendrick Motorsports | Chevrolet | 26.496 | 135.870 |
| 22 | 9 | Marcos Ambrose | Richard Petty Motorsports | Chevrolet | 26.580 | 135.440 |
| 23 | 51 | A. J. Allmendinger | Phoenix Racing | Chevrolet | 26.580 | 135.440 |
| 24 | 34 | David Ragan | Front Row Motorsports | Ford | 26.614 | 135.267 |
| 25 | 78 | Kurt Busch | Furniture Row Racing | Chevrolet | 26.618 | 135.247 |
| 26 | 7 | Dave Blaney | Tommy Baldwin Racing | Chevrolet | 26.647 | 135.100 |
| 27 | 36 | J. J. Yeley | Tommy Baldwin Racing | Chevrolet | 26.654 | 135.064 |
| 28 | 95 | Scott Speed | Leavine Family Racing | Ford | 26.683 | 134.917 |
| 29 | 42 | Juan Pablo Montoya | Earnhardt Ganassi Racing | Chevrolet | 26.702 | 134.821 |
| 30 | 93 | Travis Kvapil | BK Racing | Toyota | 26.725 | 134.705 |
| 31 | 38 | David Gilliland | Front Row Motorsports | Ford | 26.727 | 134.695 |
| 32 | 22 | Joey Logano | Penske Racing | Ford | 26.791 | 134.373 |
| 33 | 47 | Bobby Labonte | JTG Daugherty Racing | Toyota | 26.797 | 134.343 |
| 34 | 83 | David Reutimann | BK Racing | Toyota | 26.903 | 133.814 |
| 35 | 19 | Mike Bliss | Humphrey Smith Racing | Chevrolet | 26.911 | 133.774 |
| 36 | 35 | Josh Wise | Front Row Motorsports | Ford | 26.948 | 133.591 |
| 37 | 30 | David Stremme | Swan Racing | Toyota | 26.952 | 133.571 |
| 38 | 33 | Landon Cassill | Circle Sport | Chevrolet | 26.990 | 133.383 |
| 39 | 44 | Scott Riggs | Xxxtreme Motorsports | Ford | 27.084 | 132.920 |
| 40 | 10 | Danica Patrick | Stewart–Haas Racing | Chevrolet | 27.090 | 132.890 |
| 41 | 87 | Joe Nemechek | NEMCO-Jay Robinson Racing | Toyota | 27.268 | 132.023 |
| 42 | 32 | Ken Schrader | FAS Lane Racing | Ford | 27.325 | 131.747 |
| 43 | 13 | Casey Mears | Germain Racing | Ford | 27.421 | 131.286 |

=== Race results ===
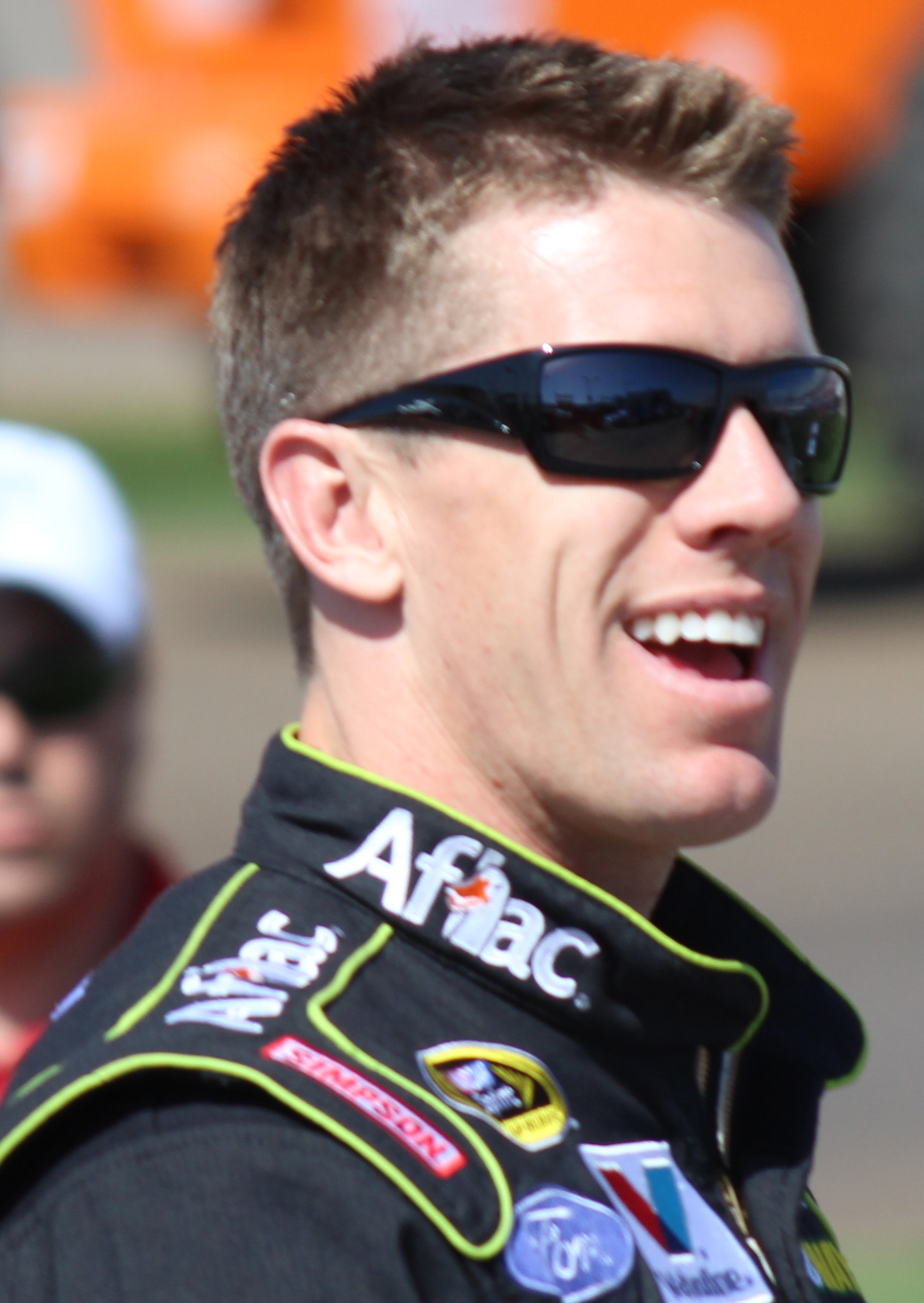
Carl Edwards won the race.

| Pos | Car | Driver | Team | Manufacturer | Laps | Points |
|---|---|---|---|---|---|---|
| 1 | 99 | Carl Edwards | Roush Fenway Racing | Ford | 316 | 48 |
| 2 | 48 | Jimmie Johnson | Hendrick Motorsports | Chevrolet | 316 | 43 |
| 3 | 11 | Denny Hamlin | Joe Gibbs Racing | Toyota | 316 | 41 |
| 4 | 2 | Brad Keselowski | Penske Racing | Ford | 316 | 41 |
| 5 | 88 | Dale Earnhardt Jr. | Hendrick Motorsports | Chevrolet | 316 | 40 |
| 6 | 15 | Clint Bowyer | Michael Waltrip Racing | Toyota | 316 | 38 |
| 7 | 20 | Matt Kenseth | Joe Gibbs Racing | Toyota | 316 | 37 |
| 8 | 14 | Tony Stewart | Stewart–Haas Racing | Chevrolet | 316 | 36 |
| 9 | 24 | Jeff Gordon | Hendrick Motorsports | Chevrolet | 316 | 35 |
| 10 | 31 | Jeff Burton | Richard Childress Racing | Chevrolet | 316 | 34 |
| 11 | 51 | A. J. Allmendinger | Phoenix Racing | Chevrolet | 316 | 33 |
| 12 | 42 | Juan Pablo Montoya | Earnhardt Ganassi Racing | Chevrolet | 316 | 33 |
| 13 | 29 | Kevin Harvick | Richard Childress Racing | Chevrolet | 316 | 31 |
| 14 | 13 | Casey Mears | Germain Racing | Ford | 316 | 30 |
| 15 | 43 | Aric Almirola | Richard Petty Motorsports | Ford | 316 | 29 |
| 16 | 17 | Ricky Stenhouse Jr. | Roush Fenway Racing | Ford | 316 | 28 |
| 17 | 16 | Greg Biffle | Roush Fenway Racing | Ford | 316 | 28 |
| 18 | 9 | Marcos Ambrose | Richard Petty Motorsports | Chevrolet | 316 | 26 |
| 19 | 5 | Kasey Kahne | Hendrick Motorsports | Chevrolet | 316 | 25 |
| 20 | 27 | Paul Menard | Richard Childress Racing | Chevrolet | 316 | 24 |
| 21 | 55 | Mark Martin | Michael Waltrip Racing | Toyota | 316 | 24 |
| 22 | 1 | Jamie McMurray | Earnhardt Ganassi Racing | Chevrolet | 316 | 22 |
| 23 | 18 | Kyle Busch | Joe Gibbs Racing | Toyota | 316 | 21 |
| 24 | 47 | Bobby Labonte | JTG Daugherty Racing | Toyota | 315 | 20 |
| 25 | 83 | David Reutimann | BK Racing | Toyota | 315 | 19 |
| 26 | 22 | Joey Logano | Penske Racing | Ford | 315 | 18 |
| 27 | 78 | Kurt Busch | Furniture Row Racing | Chevrolet | 315 | 17 |
| 28 | 36 | J. J. Yeley | Tommy Baldwin Racing | Chevrolet | 315 | 16 |
| 29 | 93 | Travis Kvapil | BK Racing | Toyota | 313 | 15 |
| 30 | 30 | David Stremme | Swan Racing | Toyota | 313 | 14 |
| 31 | 87 | Joe Nemechek | NEMCO-Jay Robinson Racing | Toyota | 311 | – |
| 32 | 33 | Landon Cassill | Circle Sport | Chevrolet | 309 | 12 |
| 33 | 7 | Dave Blaney | Tommy Baldwin Racing | Chevrolet | 306 | 11 |
| 34 | 32 | Ken Schrader | FAS Lane Racing | Ford | 300 | 10 |
| 35 | 35 | Josh Wise | Front Row Motorsports | Ford | 295 | – |
| 36 | 56 | Martin Truex Jr. | Michael Waltrip Racing | Toyota | 284 | 8 |
| 37 | 38 | David Gilliland | Front Row Motorsports | Ford | 237 | 7 |
| 38 | 34 | David Ragan | Front Row Motorsports | Ford | 186 | 7 |
| 39 | 10 | Danica Patrick | Stewart–Haas Racing | Chevrolet | 184 | 5 |
| 40 | 39 | Ryan Newman | Stewart–Haas Racing | Chevrolet | 137 | 4 |
| 41 | 95 | Scott Speed | Leavine Family Racing | Ford | 88 | 3 |
| 42 | 19 | Mike Bliss | Humphrey Smith Racing | Chevrolet | 34 | – |
| 43 | 44 | Scott Riggs | Xxxtreme Motorsports | Ford | 19 | – |

== Standings after the race ==
Drivers' Championship standings

| | Pos | Driver | Points |
|---|---|---|---|
| | 1 | Jimmie Johnson | 90 |
| | 2 | Dale Earnhardt Jr. | 82 (–8) |
| 1 | 3 | Brad Keselowski | 82 (–8) |
| 9 | 4 | Denny Hamlin | 72 (–18) |
| 5 | 5 | Clint Bowyer | 72 (–18) |

Manufacturers' Championship standings

| | Pos | Manufacturer | Points |
|---|---|---|---|
| | 1 | Chevrolet | 14 |
| 1 | 2 | Ford | 14 (–0) |
| 1 | 3 | Toyota | 10 (–4) |

- Note: Only the first twelve positions are included for the driver standings.

| Previous race: 2013 Daytona 500 | Sprint Cup Series; 2013 season | Next race: 2013 Kobalt Tools 400 |
