= 2013 Bank of America 500 =

Race details
- Race 31 of 36 in the 2013 NASCAR Sprint Cup Series
- The 2013 Bank of America 500 program cover, featuring all 13 Chase drivers. Artwork by NASCAR artist Sam Bass. "Road Trip!"
- Date: October 12, 2013
- Location: Charlotte Motor Speedway, Concord, North Carolina
- Course: Permanent racing facility
- Course length: 1.5 miles (2.4 km)
- Distance: 334 laps, 501 mi (806.281 km)
- Weather: Temperatures reaching a high around 84 °F (29 °C); wind speeds approaching a maximum of 11.1 miles per hour (17.9 km/h)

Pole position
Driver	Jeff Gordon	Hendrick Motorsports
- Time: 27.791 seconds

Most laps led

Winner
No. 2	Brad Keselowski	Team Penske

Television in the United States
- Network: ABC
- Announcers: Allen Bestwick, Dale Jarrett and Andy Petree

The 2013 Bank of America 500 was a NASCAR Sprint Cup Series stock car race held on October 12, 2013, at Charlotte Motor Speedway in Concord, North Carolina. Contested over 334 laps on the 1.5-mile (2.4 km) asphalt quad-oval, it was the thirty-first race of the 2013 Sprint Cup Series season, as well as the fifth race in the ten-race Chase for the Sprint Cup, which ends the season. Brad Keselowski won the race, his first of the season, while Kasey Kahne finished second and Matt Kenseth finished third. This was the first time since October 2011 that a Chase race was "spoiled" by a non-Chase driver.

This race also marked the first Cup Series start for 2021 and 2025 champion Kyle Larson.

== Entry list ==
(R) - Denotes rookie driver.

(i) - Denotes driver who is ineligible for series driver points.

No.	Driver	Team	Manufacturer
1	Jamie McMurray	Earnhardt Ganassi Racing	Chevrolet
2	Brad Keselowski	Penske Racing	Ford
5	Kasey Kahne	Hendrick Motorsports	Chevrolet
7	Dave Blaney	Tommy Baldwin Racing	Chevrolet
9	Marcos Ambrose	Richard Petty Motorsports	Ford
10	Danica Patrick (R)	Stewart–Haas Racing	Chevrolet
11	Denny Hamlin	Joe Gibbs Racing	Toyota
13	Casey Mears	Germain Racing	Ford
14	Mark Martin	Stewart–Haas Racing	Chevrolet
15	Clint Bowyer	Michael Waltrip Racing	Toyota
16	Greg Biffle	Roush Fenway Racing	Ford
17	Ricky Stenhouse Jr. (R)	Roush Fenway Racing	Ford
18	Kyle Busch	Joe Gibbs Racing	Toyota
20	Matt Kenseth	Joe Gibbs Racing	Toyota
22	Joey Logano	Penske Racing	Ford
24	Jeff Gordon	Hendrick Motorsports	Chevrolet
27	Paul Menard	Richard Childress Racing	Chevrolet
29	Kevin Harvick	Richard Childress Racing	Chevrolet
30	Cole Whitt (i)	Swan Racing	Toyota
31	Jeff Burton	Richard Childress Racing	Chevrolet
32	Timmy Hill (R)	FAS Lane Racing	Ford
33	Brian Scott (i)	Richard Childress Racing	Chevrolet
34	David Ragan	Front Row Motorsports	Ford
35	Josh Wise (i)	Front Row Motorsports	Ford
36	J. J. Yeley	Tommy Baldwin Racing	Chevrolet
38	David Gilliland	Front Row Motorsports	Ford
39	Ryan Newman	Stewart–Haas Racing	Chevrolet
40	Landon Cassill (i)	Circle Sport	Chevrolet
42	Juan Pablo Montoya	Earnhardt Ganassi Racing	Chevrolet
43	Aric Almirola	Richard Petty Motorsports	Ford
47	Bobby Labonte	JTG Daugherty Racing	Toyota
48	Jimmie Johnson	Hendrick Motorsports	Chevrolet
51	Kyle Larson (i)	HScott Motorsports	Chevrolet
55	Brian Vickers (i)	Michael Waltrip Racing	Toyota
56	Martin Truex Jr.	Michael Waltrip Racing	Toyota
78	Kurt Busch	Furniture Row Racing	Chevrolet
83	David Reutimann	BK Racing	Toyota
87	Joe Nemechek (i)	NEMCO-Jay Robinson Racing	Toyota
88	Dale Earnhardt Jr.	Hendrick Motorsports	Chevrolet
93	Travis Kvapil	BK Racing	Toyota
95	Blake Koch (i)	Leavine Family Racing	Ford
98	Michael McDowell	Phil Parsons Racing	Ford
99	Carl Edwards	Roush Fenway Racing	Ford
Official entry list

The layout of Charlotte Motor Speedway, the venue where the race was held.

== Final Practice Results ==
Pos	No.	Driver	Team	Manufacturer	Time
1	78	Kurt Busch	Furniture Row Racing	Chevrolet	28.308
2	29	Kevin Harvick	Richard Childress Racing	Chevrolet	28.479
3	2	Brad Keselowski	Penske Racing	Ford	28.511
4	15	Clint Bowyer	Michael Waltrip Racing	Toyota	28.531
5	18	Kyle Busch	Joe Gibbs Racing	Toyota	28.548
6	27	Paul Menard	Richard Childress Racing	Chevrolet	28.549
7	99	Carl Edwards	Roush Fenway Racing	Ford	28.575
8	48	Jimmie Johnson	Hendrick Motorsports	Chevrolet	28.579
9	22	Joey Logano	Penske Racing	Ford	28.602
10	24	Jeff Gordon	Hendrick Motorsports	Chevrolet	28.624
11	39	Ryan Newman	Stewart–Haas Racing	Chevrolet	28.629
12	56	Martin Truex Jr.	Michael Waltrip Racing	Toyota	28.633
13	5	Kasey Kahne	Hendrick Motorsports	Chevrolet	28.636
14	43	Aric Almirola	Richard Petty Motorsports	Ford	28.653
15	42	Juan Pablo Montoya	Earnhardt Ganassi Racing	Chevrolet	28.657
16	88	Dale Earnhardt Jr.	Hendrick Motorsports	Chevrolet	28.715
17	14	Mark Martin	Stewart–Haas Racing	Chevrolet	28.763
18	55	Brian Vickers (i)	Michael Waltrip Racing	Toyota	28.778
19	31	Jeff Burton	Richard Childress Racing	Chevrolet	28.792
20	11	Denny Hamlin	Joe Gibbs Racing	Toyota	28.794
21	17	Ricky Stenhouse Jr. (R)	Roush Fenway Racing	Ford	28.805
22	16	Greg Biffle	Roush Fenway Racing	Ford	28.812
23	20	Matt Kenseth	Joe Gibbs Racing	Toyota	28.821
24	33	Brian Scott (i)	Richard Childress Racing	Chevrolet	28.844
25	9	Marcos Ambrose	Richard Petty Motorsports	Ford	28.906
26	47	Bobby Labonte	JTG Daugherty Racing	Toyota	28.963
27	51	Kyle Larson (i)	HScott Motorsports	Chevrolet	28.981
28	38	David Gilliland	Front Row Motorsports	Ford	29.004
29	10	Danica Patrick (R)	Stewart Haas Racing	Chevrolet	29.020
30	1	Jamie McMurray	Earnhardt Ganassi Racing	Chevrolet	29.028
31	30	Cole Whitt (i)	Swan Racing Company	Toyota	29.080
32	13	Casey Mears	Germain Racing	Ford	29.131
33	7	Dave Blaney	Tommy Baldwin Racing	Chevrolet	29.157
34	83	David Reutimann	BK Racing	Toyota	29.273
35	40	Landon Cassill	Circle Sport Racing	Chevrolet	29.322
36	93	Travis Kvapil	BK Racing	Toyota	29.344
37	34	David Ragan	Front Row Motorsports	Ford	29.361
38	35	Josh Wise (i)	Front Row Motorsports	Ford	29.392
39	36	J. J. Yeley	Tommy Baldwin Racing	Chevrolet	29.533
40	98	Michael McDowell	Phil Parsons Racing	Ford	29.635
41	32	Timmy Hill	FAS Lane Racing	Ford	29.698
42	95	Blake Koch (i)	Leavine Family Racing	Ford	29.714
Final practice results

== Qualifying results ==
Pos	No.	Driver	Team	Manufacturer	Time
1	24	Jeff Gordon	Hendrick Motorsports	Chevrolet	27.791
2	29	Kevin Harvick	Richard Childress Racing	Chevrolet	27.806
3	16	Greg Biffle	Roush Fenway Racing	Ford	27.841
4	48	Jimmie Johnson	Hendrick Motorsports	Chevrolet	27.865
5	5	Kasey Kahne	Hendrick Motorsports	Chevrolet	27.879
6	88	Dale Earnhardt Jr.	Hendrick Motorsports	Chevrolet	27.902
7	39	Ryan Newman	Stewart Haas Racing	Chevrolet	27.913
8	42	Juan Pablo Montoya	Earnhardt Ganassi Racing	Chevrolet	27.919
9	18	Kyle Busch	Joe Gibbs Racing	Toyota	27.921
10	78	Kurt Busch	Furniture Row Racing	Chevrolet	27.963
11	43	Aric Almirola	Richard Petty Motorsports	Ford	27.980
12	22	Joey Logano	Penske Racing	Ford	27.983
13	27	Paul Menard	Richard Childress Racing	Chevrolet	28.015
14	15	Clint Bowyer	Michael Waltrip Racing	Toyota	28.020
15	99	Carl Edwards	Roush Fenway Racing	Ford	28.041
16	17	Ricky Stenhouse Jr.	Roush Fenway Racing	Ford	28.072
17	56	Martin Truex Jr.	Michael Waltrip Racing	Toyota	28.091
18	11	Denny Hamlin	Joe Gibbs Racing	Toyota	28.107
19	33	Brian Scott	Richard Childress Racing	Chevrolet	28.122
20	20	Matt Kenseth	Joe Gibbs Racing	Toyota	28.126
21	51	Kyle Larson	HScott Motorsports	Chevrolet	28.131
22	14	Mark Martin	Stewart–Haas Racing	Chevrolet	28.157
23	2	Brad Keselowski	Penske Racing	Ford	28.162
24	47	Bobby Labonte	JTG Daugherty Racing	Toyota	28.179
25	1	Jamie McMurray	Earnhardt Ganassi Racing	Chevrolet	28.189
26	31	Jeff Burton	Richard Childress Racing	Chevrolet	28.203
27	55	Brian Vickers	Michael Waltrip Racing	Toyota	28.278
28	13	Casey Mears	Germain Racing	Ford	28.333
29	9	Marcos Ambrose	Richard Petty Motorsports	Chevrolet	28.339
30	34	David Ragan	Front Row Motorsports	Ford	28.369
31	30	Cole Whitt	Swan Racing Company	Toyota	28.370
32	40	Landon Cassill	Circle Sport Racing	Chevrolet	28.470
33	35	Josh Wise	Front Row Motorsports	Ford	28.542
34	38	David Gilliland	Front Row Motorsports	Ford	28.561
35	10	Danica Patrick	Stewart–Haas Racing	Chevrolet	28.583
36	83	David Reutimann	BK Racing	Toyota	28.631
37	98	Michael McDowell	Phil Parsons Racing	Ford	28.659
38	87	Joe Nemechek	NEMCO-Jay Robinson Racing	Toyota	28.741
39	7	Dave Blaney	Tommy Baldwin Racing	Chevrolet	28.746
40	32	Timmy Hill	FAS Lane Racing	Ford	28.823
41	93	Travis Kvapil	BK Racing	Toyota	28.924
42	36	J. J. Yeley	Tommy Baldwin Racing	Chevrolet	29.049
43	95	Blake Koch	Leavine Family Racing	Ford	29.905

== Race summary ==
Dale Earnhardt Jr. helped to enhance fuel injection research for NASCAR as he was leading lap 34 out of 334. His contribution to the fledgling technology came in the form of driving the one-millionth mile with an electronic fuel injection system.

== Race results ==
Finish	No.	Driver	Make	Team	Laps	Led	Status	Pts	Winnings
1	2	Brad Keselowski	Ford	Penske Racing	334	11	running	47	$314,441
2	5	Kasey Kahne	Chevrolet	Hendrick Motorsports	334	138	running	44	$224,810
3	20	Matt Kenseth	Toyota	Joe Gibbs Racing	334	1	running	42	$199,426
4	48	Jimmie Johnson	Chevrolet	Hendrick Motorsports	334	130	running	41	$192,721
5	18	Kyle Busch	Toyota	Joe Gibbs Racing	334	4	running	40	$163,568
6	29	Kevin Harvick	Chevrolet	Richard Childress Racing	334	0	running	38	$157,346
7	24	Jeff Gordon	Chevrolet	Hendrick Motorsports	334	26	running	38	$171,571
8	39	Ryan Newman	Chevrolet	Stewart–Haas Racing	334	2	running	37	$129,343
9	11	Denny Hamlin	Toyota	Joe Gibbs Racing	334	0	running	35	$107,160
10	99	Carl Edwards	Ford	Roush Fenway Racing	334	1	running	35	$126,310
11	15	Clint Bowyer	Toyota	Michael Waltrip Racing	334	1	running	34	$127,493
12	42	Juan Pablo Montoya	Chevrolet	Earnhardt Ganassi Racing	334	0	running	32	$114,949
13	17	Ricky Stenhouse Jr.	Ford	Roush Fenway Racing	334	0	running	31	$131,121
14	78	Kurt Busch	Chevrolet	Furniture Row Racing	333	0	running	30	$110,280
15	88	Dale Earnhardt Jr.	Chevrolet	Hendrick Motorsports	333	19	running	30	$99,435
16	16	Greg Biffle	Ford	Roush Fenway Racing	333	0	running	28	$104,660
17	9	Marcos Ambrose	Ford	Richard Petty Motorsports	333	0	running	27	$107,874
18	22	Joey Logano	Ford	Penske Racing	332	0	running	26	$108,018
19	1	Jamie McMurray	Chevrolet	Earnhardt Ganassi Racing	332	0	running	25	$105,955
20	10	Danica Patrick	Chevrolet	Stewart–Haas Racing	332	0	running	24	$80,310
21	31	Jeff Burton	Chevrolet	Richard Childress Racing	332	0	running	23	$86,685
22	56	Martin Truex Jr.	Toyota	Michael Waltrip Racing	331	0	running	22	$110,335
23	43	Aric Almirola	Ford	Richard Petty Motorsports	331	0	running	21	$114,796
24	27	Paul Menard	Chevrolet	Richard Childress Racing	331	0	running	20	$107,501
25	55	Brian Vickers	Toyota	Michael Waltrip Racing	330	0	running	0	$85,735
26	83	David Reutimann	Toyota	BK Racing	330	0	running	18	$95,043
27	33	Brian Scott	Chevrolet	Richard Childress Racing	330	0	running	0	$92,718
28	47	Bobby Labonte	Toyota	JTG Daugherty Racing	329	0	running	16	$98,418
29	38	David Gilliland	Ford	Front Row Motorsports	328	1	running	16	$87,693
30	34	David Ragan	Ford	Front Row Motorsports	328	0	running	14	$94,347
31	13	Casey Mears	Ford	Germain Racing	328	0	running	13	$80,585
32	7	Dave Blaney	Chevrolet	Tommy Baldwin Racing	327	0	running	12	$72,360
33	40	Landon Cassill	Chevrolet	Circle Sport Racing	327	0	running	0	$72,235
34	30	Cole Whitt	Toyota	Swan Racing Company	327	0	running	0	$72,110
35	93	Travis Kvapil	Toyota	BK Racing	326	0	running	9	$79,960
36	32	Timmy Hill	Ford	FAS Lane Racing	324	0	running	8	$71,780
37	51	Kyle Larson	Chevrolet	HScott Motorsports	247	0	engine	0	$79,650
38	95	Blake Koch	Ford	Leavine Family Racing	216	0	vibration	0	$66,550
39	87	Joe Nemechek	Toyota	NEMCO-Jay Robinson Racing	149	0	electrical	0	$62,550
40	98	Michael McDowell	Ford	Phil Parsons Racing	83	0	vibration	4	$58,550
41	35	Josh Wise	Ford	Front Row Motorsports	81	0	brakes	0	$54,550
42	14	Mark Martin	Chevrolet	Stewart–Haas Racing	80	0	engine	2	$97,375
43	36	J. J. Yeley	Chevrolet	Tommy Baldwin Racing	23	0	crash	1	$47,050

Previous race: 2013 Hollywood Casino 400	Sprint Cup Series; 2013 season	Next race: 2013 Camping World RV Sales 500
