= Swan Racing =

Stock car racing team

- Owner(s): Brandon Davis; Bill Romanowski (minority)
- Base: Mooresville, North Carolina
- Series: Sprint Cup Series
- Manufacturer: Chevrolet; Toyota
- Opened: 2011
- Closed: 2014

Career
- Debut: 2011 Crown Royal 400 (Richmond)
- Latest race: 2014 Bojangles' Southern 500 (Darlington)
- Races competed: 99
- Drivers' Championships: 0
- Race victories: 0
- Pole positions: 0

Swan Racing was a stock car racing team that competed in the NASCAR Sprint Cup Series until the 2014 season. The team was founded as Inception Motorsports which fielded a single No. 30 team in the Cup Series in 2011 and 2012 before being purchased by Swan Energy CEO Brandon Davis late in 2012. The team was headquartered in Mooresville, North Carolina. David Stremme was the team's original driver, before being replaced by rookies Cole Whitt and Parker Kligerman at the end of 2013. The team expanded to two teams in 2014 for Whitt and Kilgerman, attempting and qualifying for every event that season until the woes of sponsorship kicked in following the eighth race of the season. The team shut down in April 2014; its owners points, employees, and most of its assets moved to NY Racing Team and BK Racing, though Parker Kligerman remained under contract through year's end.

== Team history ==
The team was established as Inception Motorsports in April 2011 in Mooresville, North Carolina by Inception Investment Group CEO Timothy McSweeney with David Stremme as the driver of the No. 30. The following year, Inception Motorsports switched from Chevrolet to Toyota.

Before the 2012 Talladega fall race, McSweeney sold the team to 33-year-old Brandon Davis, a racing enthusiast and CEO of independent petroleum company Swan Energy. Davis vowed to change the team's reputation as a start and park entry, and instead run full races. The team utilized engines from Triad Racing Technologies, hired former crew chief Steve Hmiel to be the competition director, and switched names to Swan Racing Company (Swan Racing for short). On January 31, 2013, former NFL linebacker Bill Romanowski became a minority owner of Swan Racing. His health supplement company, Nutrition53 (Romanowski wore the No. 53 during his 16-year playing career) was a primary sponsor for ten races and an associate sponsor for the remaining 26.

Prior to the fall race at Richmond in 2013, the team announced that it was releasing driver David Stremme following that weekend's event, and planned to run several young drivers in preparation for the 2014 season. The move blindsided Stremme, who had helped found the team out of his own race shop and was integral in Davis' purchase of the organization in 2012. Stremme also held a profit stake in the team, though it had yet to make a profit. On December 3, 2013, the team announced that Cole Whitt and Parker Kligerman would compete for Rookie of the Year honors for them in 2014, as the team expanded to two full-time cars with the No. 26 and No. 30. On January 13, 2014, Anthony Marlowe from Iowa City Capital Partners was announced as a minority owner. On February 4, 2014, it was announced that rapper 50 Cent's headset company SMS Audio will serve as Swan Racing's associate sponsor.

On April 17, 2014, team officials announced that they would be reviewing the team's future due to lack sponsorship, though co-owner Anthony Marlowe stated he intended to run Whitt for the rest of the season. On April 23, the team announced it had sold off both entries, with Whitt, Marlowe, and the No. 26 entry moving under the BK Racing banner. The owners points of the No. 30 team were sold to NY Racing Team, which fielded a No. 30 car at Richmond before switching to their usual No. 44. Swan Racing's shop in Statesville, North Carolina was also sold to NY Racing Team.

On July 10, 2018, former Swan Racing crew chief Steven Lane formed On Point Motorsports in the NASCAR Camping World Truck Series running the No. 30 as a reference to Swan, the team currently competes full-time in the truck series with driver Tate Fogleman.

=== Car No. 26 history ===
On February 13, 2013, NASCAR approved a temporary number change for the Daytona 500 to allow Swan Racing to compete using the number 26, as a charity effort in honor of the 26 who died during the Sandy Hook shooting in Newtown, Connecticut. Two-time Daytona 500 winner and fellow Toyota team owner Michael Waltrip drove the car, with regular driver David Stremme recruiting Waltrip to "further [the team's] relationship with Toyota." Waltrip was also reunited with former Dale Earnhardt, Inc. crew chief Tony Eury Jr. Waltrip drive the car to a 22nd-place finish. The team ran the No. 30 for the rest of the year.

On January 7, 2014, Swan Racing announced that their new second full-time team would be numbered 26. Former Red Bull Racing and JR Motorsports driver Cole Whitt was hired to drive the 26, after running seven late season races for the team in 2013. New investor Anthony Marlowe was listed as the owner. The car was sponsored by Speed Stick GEAR in the 2014 Daytona 500, and several other early-season races. Whitt qualified for each of the first eight races, and recorded a single top-20 (at Auto Club Speedway). After Darlington, he No. 26 team was sold to former Swan Racing minority partner Anthony Marlowe, who in turn merged his ownership of the team with BK Racing.

==== Car No. 26 results ====
NASCAR Sprint Cup Series results
Year	Driver	No.	Make	1	2	3	4	5	6	7	8	9	10	11	12	13	14	15	16	17	18	19	20	21	22	23	24	25	26	27	28	29	30	31	32	33	34	35	36	Owners	Pts
2014	Cole Whitt	26	Toyota	DAY; 28	PHO; 27	LVS; 36	BRI; 40	CAL; 18	MAR; 29	TEX; 31	DAR; 38	RCH	TAL	KAN	CLT	DOV	POC	MCH	SON	KEN	DAY	NHA	IND	POC	GLN	MCH	BRI	ATL	RCH	CHI	NHA	DOV	KAN	CLT	TAL	MAR	TEX	PHO	HOM	31st	532

=== Car No. 30 history ===
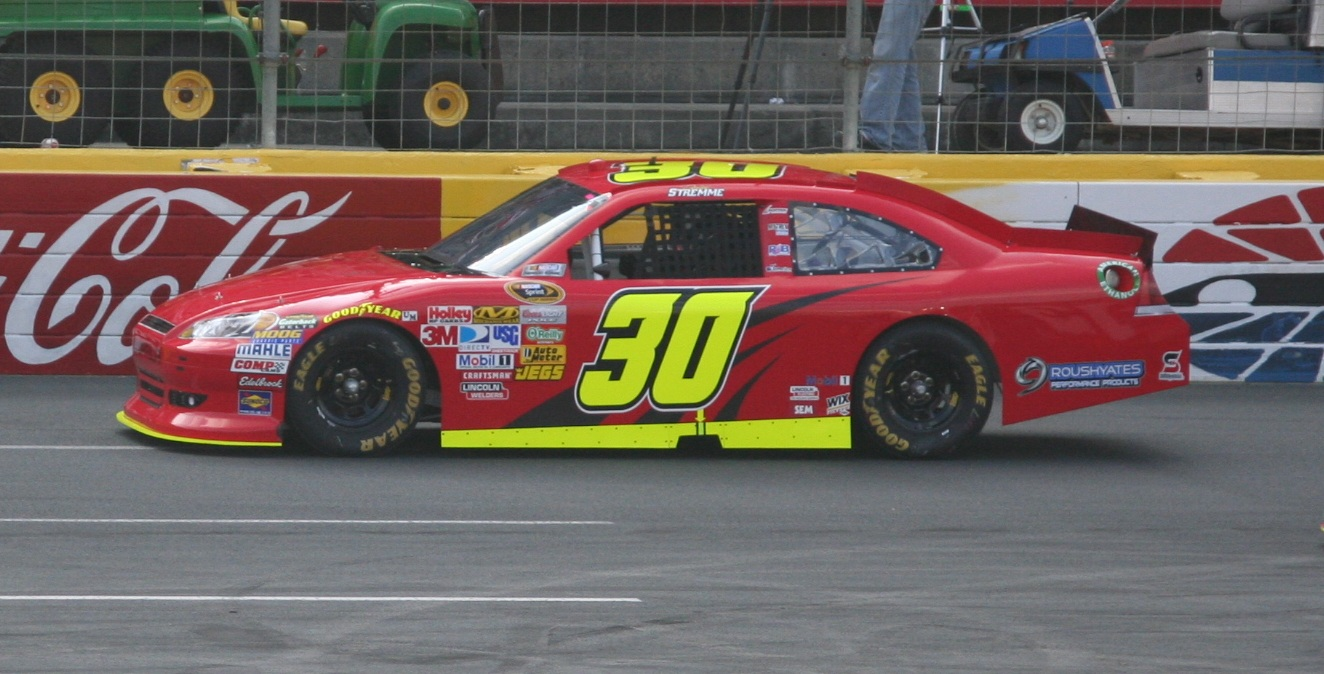
The team's 2011 car under Inception Motorsports

The No. 30 team made its debut in the 2011 Crown Royal 400 at Richmond with David Stremme as the driver, qualifying 16th in their first attempt at competition. Steven Lane was the crew chief. Throughout the season, the team attempted 18 races, but failed to qualify for five, including the 2011 Brickyard 400. Inception Motorsports finished 43rd in the 2011 Sprint Cup Series team owners' standings.

For the 2012 Sprint Cup Series season, the team ran the full 36 race schedule with Stremme driving in all races except the two road course races, where Brian Simo and Patrick Long drove respectively. They made the field on qualifying speeds for the 2012 Daytona 500, taking the third of three guaranteed starting positions for teams not in the top 35 in owner points. The team later acquired the 2011 owners' points from the defunct The Racer's Group No. 71 team, which had finished 36th in the owner standings and shut down at the end of 2012. The team qualified for each of the first six races of the season, with a best finish of 28th at Las Vegas, before failing to qualify for the season's seventh race at Texas. Having failed to reach the top 35 in owners points, the team began to start and park due to a lack of sponsorship, eventually parking in 20 out of 28 races. The team did finish six races and its best 2012 finish was 24th at Indianapolis.

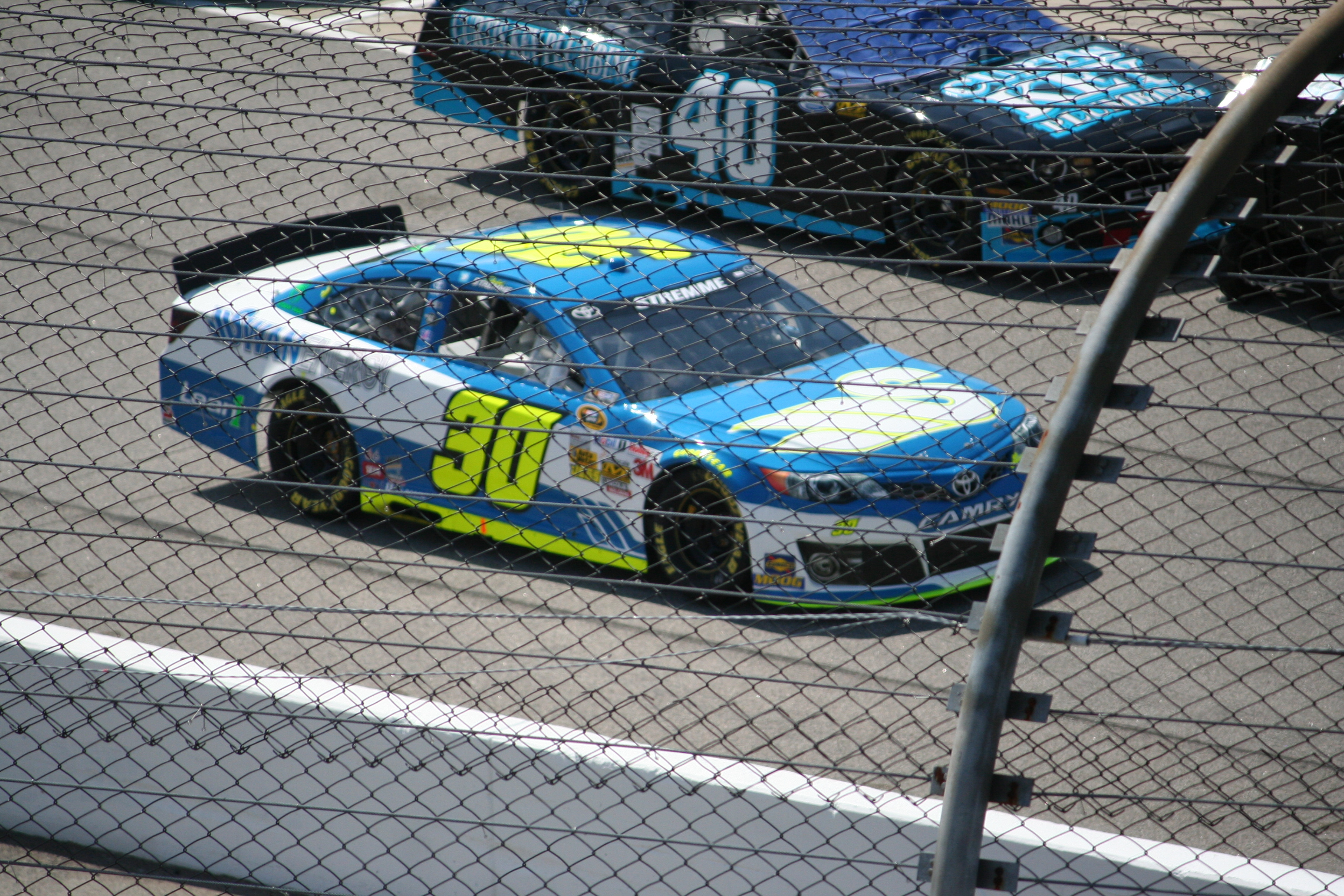
The team's 2013 car at Richmond International Raceway

Following Michael Waltrip's run in the 2013 Daytona 500, Stremme returned to drive for the newly rechristened Swan Racing, with Tony Eury Jr. taking over crew chief duties for the team. The team only recorded four top 20s in the first 26 races. Stremme was released following the September race at Richmond, being replaced by Cole Whitt for four races. Whitt finished 39th at Chicagoland. Four-time Chili Bowl Midget Nationals winner Kevin Swindell ran the No. 30 at Loudon with local sponsor Genny Light, finishing 38th after an accident. Whitt wound up running seven races for the team, while Parker Kligerman started two races at Texas and Homestead, with solid finishes of 18th and 25th respectively. Overall, the team had five DNF's all season and failed to reach the halfway point of a race only once, when Whitt crashed at Phoenix in November.

On January 7, 2014, Parker Kligerman, a former development driver for Team Penske and Kyle Busch Motorsports, was confirmed as the driver of the No. 30 for 2014. Unfortunately, Kligerman struggled mightily through eight races, with a best finish of 29th at Daytona, where he crashed out of the race on Lap 193. He also failed to finish at Phoenix (engine), Auto Club (crash), and Texas (radiator), suffered a non-terminal electronic fuel injection problem at Las Vegas and a first lap wreck at Martinsville. The owners points of the No. 30 were later sold to Xxxtreme Motorsport with driver J. J. Yeley due to Swan's financial struggles, with the No. 30 crew following. However, Kligerman continued to remain under contract.

==== Car No. 30 results ====
NASCAR Sprint Cup Series results
Year	Driver	No.	Make	1	2	3	4	5	6	7	8	9	10	11	12	13	14	15	16	17	18	19	20	21	22	23	24	25	26	27	28	29	30	31	32	33	34	35	36	Owners	Pts
2011	David Stremme	30	Chevy	DAY	PHO	LVS	BRI	CAL	MAR	TEX	TAL	RCH; 34	DAR; 41	DOV; 42	CLT; 40	KAN; 39	POC	MCH; 41	SON	DAY	KEN; DNQ	NHA; 37	IND; DNQ	POC; 38	GLN	MCH; 40	BRI; 32	ATL; DNQ	RCH; 40	CHI; 41	NHA; 38	DOV; 41	KAN; 40	CLT; 41	TAL	MAR; 38	TEX; DNQ	PHO; DNQ	HOM; 42	43rd	80
2012	David Stremme	30	Toyota	DAY; 37	PHO; 29	LVS; 28	BRI; 38	CAL; 39	MAR; 30	TEX; DNQ	KAN; 38	RCH; 37	TAL; 39	DAR; 39	CLT; 38	DOV; 33	POC; DNQ	MCH; DNQ		KEN; 39	DAY; 35	NHA; 35	IND; 24	POC; 34		MCH; 34	BRI; 37	ATL; 39	RCH; 37	CHI; 39	NHA; 35	DOV; DNQ	TAL; 33	CLT; 37	KAN; DNQ	MAR; 40	TEX; DNQ	PHO; 34	HOM; 38	38th	238
2012	Brian Simo	30	Toyota																SON; DNQ																					38th	238
2012	Patrick Long	30	Toyota																						GLN; 42															38th	238
2013	Michael Waltrip	26	Toyota	DAY; 22																																				33rd	507
2013	David Stremme	30	Toyota		PHO; 30	LVS; 32	BRI; 20	CAL; 31	MAR; 36	TEX; 27	KAN; 32	RCH; 31	TAL; 12	DAR; 40	CLT; 32	DOV; 28	POC; 28	MCH; 29	SON; 36	KEN; 25	DAY; 37	NHA; 20	IND; 40	POC; 30	GLN; 33	MCH; 26	BRI; 17	ATL; 29	RCH; 38											33rd	507
2013	Cole Whitt	30	Toyota																											CHI; 39		DOV; 27	KAN; 31	CLT; 34	TAL; 31	MAR; 35		PHO; 40		33rd	507
2013	Kevin Swindell	30	Toyota																												NHA; 38									33rd	507
2013	Parker Kligerman	30	Toyota																																		TEX; 18		HOM; 25	33rd	507
2014	Parker Kligerman	30	Toyota	DAY; 29	PHO; 42	LVS; 40	BRI; 34	CAL; 42	MAR; 41	TEX; 40	DAR; 30	RCH	TAL	KAN	CLT	DOV	POC	MCH	SON	KEN	DAY	NHA	IND	POC	GLN	MCH	BRI	ATL	RCH	CHI	NHA	DOV	KAN	CLT	TAL	MAR	TEX	PHO	HOM	53rd	54
