= 2013 Hollywood Casino 400 =

Race details
- Race 30 of 36 in the 2013 NASCAR Sprint Cup Series
- Date: October 6, 2013
- Location: Kansas City, Kansas
- Course: Permanent racing facility
- Course length: 1.5 miles (2.4 km)
- Distance: 267 laps, 400.5 mi (644.5 km)
- Weather: Temperatures reaching up to 64.9 °F (18.3 °C); wind speeds up to 13 miles per hour (21 km/h)
- Average speed: 114.884 mph (184.888 km/h)

Pole position
Driver	Kevin Harvick	Richard Childress Racing

Most laps led
Driver	Kevin Harvick	Richard Childress Racing
- Laps: 138

Winner
No. 29	Kevin Harvick	Richard Childress Racing

Television in the United States
- Network: ESPN
- Announcers: Allen Bestwick, Dale Jarrett and Andy Petree

The 2013 Hollywood Casino 400 was a NASCAR Sprint Cup Series race that was held on October 6, 2013, at Kansas Speedway in Kansas City, Kansas. Contested over 267 laps on the 1.5–mile (2.4 km) oval, it was the 30th race of the 2013 Sprint Cup Series championship, and the 4th race in the Chase for the Sprint Cup. Kevin Harvick of Richard Childress Racing won the race, his third win of the season, while Kurt Busch finished second and Jeff Gordon finished third.

The 15 cautions flown during the race were a track record.

== Report ==
=== Entry list ===
(R) - Denotes rookie driver.

(i) - Denotes driver who is ineligible for series driver points.

No.	Driver	Team	Manufacturer
1	Jamie McMurray	Earnhardt Ganassi Racing	Chevrolet
2	Brad Keselowski	Penske Racing	Ford
5	Kasey Kahne	Hendrick Motorsports	Chevrolet
7	Dave Blaney	Tommy Baldwin Racing	Chevrolet
9	Marcos Ambrose	Richard Petty Motorsports	Ford
10	Danica Patrick (R)	Stewart–Haas Racing	Chevrolet
11	Denny Hamlin	Joe Gibbs Racing	Toyota
13	Casey Mears	Germain Racing	Ford
14	Mark Martin	Stewart–Haas Racing	Chevrolet
15	Clint Bowyer	Michael Waltrip Racing	Toyota
16	Greg Biffle	Roush Fenway Racing	Ford
17	Ricky Stenhouse Jr. (R)	Roush Fenway Racing	Ford
18	Kyle Busch	Joe Gibbs Racing	Toyota
20	Matt Kenseth	Joe Gibbs Racing	Toyota
22	Joey Logano	Penske Racing	Ford
24	Jeff Gordon	Hendrick Motorsports	Chevrolet
27	Paul Menard	Richard Childress Racing	Chevrolet
29	Kevin Harvick	Richard Childress Racing	Chevrolet
30	Cole Whitt (i)	Swan Racing	Toyota
31	Jeff Burton	Richard Childress Racing	Chevrolet
32	Timmy Hill (R)	FAS Lane Racing	Ford
33	Landon Cassill (i)	Circle Sport	Chevrolet
34	David Ragan	Front Row Motorsports	Ford
35	Josh Wise (i)	Front Row Motorsports	Ford
36	J. J. Yeley	Tommy Baldwin Racing	Chevrolet
38	David Gilliland	Front Row Motorsports	Ford
39	Ryan Newman	Stewart–Haas Racing	Chevrolet
40	Tony Raines (i)	Circle Sport	Chevrolet
42	Juan Pablo Montoya	Earnhardt Ganassi Racing	Chevrolet
43	Aric Almirola	Richard Petty Motorsports	Ford
47	A. J. Allmendinger	JTG Daugherty Racing	Toyota
48	Jimmie Johnson	Hendrick Motorsports	Chevrolet
51	Justin Allgaier (i)	HScott Motorsports	Chevrolet
55	Brian Vickers (i)	Michael Waltrip Racing	Toyota
56	Martin Truex Jr.	Michael Waltrip Racing	Toyota
78	Kurt Busch	Furniture Row Racing	Chevrolet
83	David Reutimann	BK Racing	Toyota
87	Joe Nemechek (i)	NEMCO-Jay Robinson Racing	Toyota
88	Dale Earnhardt Jr.	Hendrick Motorsports	Chevrolet
93	Travis Kvapil	BK Racing	Toyota
95	Reed Sorenson (i)	Leavine Family Racing	Ford
98	Michael McDowell	Phil Parsons Racing	Ford
99	Carl Edwards	Roush Fenway Racing	Ford
Official entry list

== Results ==
=== Qualifying ===
Grid	No.	Driver	Team	Manufacturer	Time	Speed
1	29	Kevin Harvick	Richard Childress Racing	Chevrolet	28.796	187.526
2	88	Dale Earnhardt Jr.	Hendrick Motorsports	Chevrolet	28.803	187.480
3	48	Jimmie Johnson	Hendrick Motorsports	Chevrolet	28.852	187.162
4	99	Carl Edwards	Roush Fenway Racing	Ford	28.996	186.233
5	43	Aric Almirola	Richard Petty Motorsports	Ford	29.006	186.168
6	2	Brad Keselowski	Hendrick Motorsports	Chevrolet	29.021	186.072
7	20	Matt Kenseth	Joe Gibbs Racing	Toyota	29.049	185.893
8	27	Paul Menard	Richard Childress Racing	Chevrolet	29.052	185.874
9	78	Kurt Busch	Furniture Row Racing	Chevrolet	29.084	185.669
10	11	Denny Hamlin	Joe Gibbs Racing	Toyota	29.121	185.433
11	55	Brian Vickers	Michael Waltrip Racing	Toyota	29.123	185.420
12	42	Juan Pablo Montoya	Earnhardt Ganassi Racing	Chevrolet	29.148	185.261
13	56	Martin Truex Jr.	Michael Waltrip Racing	Toyota	29.157	185.204
14	24	Jeff Gordon	Hendrick Motorsports	Chevrolet	29.167	185.141
15	17	Ricky Stenhouse Jr.	Roush Fenway Racing	Chevrolet	29.192	184.982
16	31	Jeff Burton	Richard Childress Racing	Chevrolet	29.201	184.925
17	39	Ryan Newman	Stewart–Haas Racing	Chevrolet	29.248	184.628
18	18	Kyle Busch	Joe Gibbs Racing	Toyota	29.252	184.603
19	78	Kurt Busch	Furniture Row Racing	Chevrolet	29.272	184.477
20	43	Aric Almirola	Richard Petty Motorsports	Ford	29.287	184.382
21	51	Justin Allgaier	Phoenix Racing	Chevrolet	29.331	184.106
22	15	Clint Bowyer	Michael Waltrip Racing	Toyota	29.391	183.730
23	14	Mark Martin	Stewart–Haas Racing	Chevrolet	29.401	183.667
24	1	Jamie McMurray	Earnhardt Ganassi Racing	Chevrolet	29.447	183.380
25	9	Marcos Ambrose	Richard Petty Motorsports	Ford	29.497	183.069
26	16	Greg Biffle	Roush Fenway Racing	Ford	29.540	182.803
27	83	David Reutimann	BK Racing	Toyota	29.559	182.685
28	47	A. J. Allmendinger	JTG Daugherty Racing	Toyota	29.584	182.531
29	10	Danica Patrick #	Stewart–Haas Racing	Chevrolet	29.664	182.039
30	30	Cole Whitt	Swan Racing Company	Toyota	29.667	182.020
31	98	Michael McDowell	Phil Parsons Racing	Ford	29.675	181.971
32	34	David Ragan	Front Row Motorsports	Ford	29.677	181.959
33	36	J. J. Yeley	Tommy Baldwin Racing	Chevrolet	29.678	181.953
34	38	David Gilliland	Front Row Motorsports	Ford	29.688	181.892
35	32	Timmy Hill #	FAS Lane Racing	Ford	29.696	181.843
36	93	Travis Kvapil	BK Racing	Toyota	29.698	181.830
37	13	Casey Mears	Germain Racing	Ford	29.729	181.641
38	35	Josh Wise	Front Row Motorsports	Ford	29.898	180.614
39	87	Joe Nemechek	NEMCO-Jay Robinson Racing	Toyota	29.921	180.475
40	95	Reed Sorenson	Leavine Family Racing	Ford	30.001	179.994
41	7	Dave Blaney	Tommy Baldwin Racing	Chevrolet	30.026	179.844
42	40	Tony Raines	Hillman Racing	Chevrolet	30.082	179.509
43	33	Landon Cassill	Circle Sport	Chevrolet	30.294	178.253
# Rookie of the Year candidate Source:

=== Race results ===
Pos	Car	Driver	Team	Manufacturer	Laps	Led	Points^{1}
1	29	Kevin Harvick	Richard Childress Racing	Chevrolet	267	138	48
2	78	Kurt Busch	Furniture Row Racing	Chevrolet	267	0	42
3	24	Jeff Gordon	Hendrick Motorsports	Chevrolet	267	0	41
4	22	Joey Logano	Penske Racing	Ford	267	33	41
5	99	Carl Edwards	Roush Fenway Racing	Ford	267	0	39
6	48	Jimmie Johnson	Hendrick Motorsports	Chevrolet	267	6	39
7	27	Paul Menard	Joe Gibbs Racing	Chevrolet	267	0	37
8	88	Dale Earnhardt Jr.	Hendrick Motorsports	Chevrolet	267	10	37
9	9	Marcos Ambrose	Richard Petty Motorsports	Ford	267	0	35
10	43	Aric Almirola	Richard Petty Motorsports	Ford	267	0	34
11	20	Matt Kenseth	Joe Gibbs Racing	Toyota	267	21	34
12	31	Jeff Burton	Richard Childress Racing	Chevrolet	267	1	33
13	16	Greg Biffle	Roush Fenway Racing	Chevrolet	267	0	31
14	15	Clint Bowyer	Michael Waltrip Racing	Toyota	267	0	30
15	5	Kasey Kahne	Hendrick Motorsports	Chevrolet	267	0	29
16	1	Jamie McMurray	Earnhardt Ganassi Racing	Chevrolet	267	0	28
17	2	Brad Keselowski	Penske Racing	Ford	267	52	28
18	42	Juan Pablo Montoya	Earnhardt Ganassi Racing	Chevrolet	267	0	26
19	56	Martin Truex Jr.	Michael Waltrip Racing	Toyota	267	0	25
20	47	A. J. Allmendinger	JTG Daugherty Racing	Toyota	267	0	24
21	13	Casey Mears	Germain Racing	Ford	267	1	24
22	14	Mark Martin	Stewart–Haas Racing	Chevrolet	267	0	22
23	11	Denny Hamlin	Joe Gibbs Racing	Toyota	267	0	21
24	38	David Gilliland	Front Row Motorsports	Ford	267	0	20
25	7	David Ragan	Tommy Baldwin Racing	Chevrolet	267	0	19
26	93	Travis Kvapil	BK Racing	Toyota	267	1	19
27	36	J. J. Yeley	Tommy Baldwin Racing	Chevrolet	267	0	18
28	32	Timmy Hill #	FAS Lane Racing	Ford	267	0	17
29	40	Tony Raines	Circle Sport	Chevrolet	267	0	0
30	17	Ricky Stenhouse Jr. #	Roush Fenway Racing	Ford	266	0	14
31	30	Cole Whitt	Swan Racing Company	Toyota	260	0	0
32	55	Brian Vickers	Michael Waltrip Racing	Toyota	242	0	0
33	33	Landon Cassill	Circle Sport	Chevrolet	235	0	0
34	18	Kyle Busch	Joe Gibbs Racing	Toyota	199	1	11
35	39	Ryan Newman	Stewart–Haas Racing	Chevrolet	188	0	9
36	34	David Ragan	Front Row Motorsports	Ford	168	0	8
37	83	David Reutimann	BK Racing	Toyota	157	0	7
38	98	Michael McDowell	Phil Parsons Racing	Ford	144	0	6
39	51	Justin Allgaier	Phoenix Racing	Chevrolet	135	0	0
40	35	Josh Wise	Front Row Motorsports	Ford	108	0	0
41	87	Joe Nemechek	NEMCO-Jay Robinson Racing	Toyota	107	0	0
42	95	Reed Sorenson	Leavine Family Racing	Ford	103	0	0
43	10	Danica Patrick #	Stewart–Haas Racing	Chevrolet	0	0	1
# Rookie of the Year candidate Source:^1 Points include 3 Chase for the Sprint Cup points for winning, 1 point for leading a lap, and 1 point for most laps led.

== Standings after the race ==
Drivers' Championship standings

	Pos	Driver	Points
	1	Matt Kenseth	2183
	2	Jimmie Johnson	2180 (-3)
1	3	Kevin Harvick	2158 (-25)
1	4	Jeff Gordon	2151 (-32)
2	5	Kyle Busch	2148 (-35)
	6	Greg Biffle	2139 (-44)
2	7	Kurt Busch	2136 (-47)
2	8	Dale Earnhardt Jr.	2129 (-54)
1	9	Clint Bowyer	2128 (-55)
2	10	Joey Logano	2124 (-59)
	11	Carl Edwards	2123 (-60)
5	12	Ryan Newman	2110 (-73)
	13	Kasey Kahne	2100 (-83)

Manufacturers' Championship standings

Pos	Manufacturer	Points
1	Chevrolet	206
2	Toyota	196 (-10)
3	Ford	161 (-45)

- Note: Only the first thirteen positions are included for the driver standings.

Previous race: 2013 AAA 400	Sprint Cup Series; 2013 season	Next race: 2013 Bank of America 500
