= 2014 STP 500 =

Race details
- Race 6 of 36 in the 2014 NASCAR Sprint Cup Series
- Martinsville Speedway
- Date: March 30, 2014
- Location: Martinsville Speedway; Ridgeway, Virginia
- Course: Permanent racing facility
- Course length: 0.526 miles (0.847 km)
- Distance: 500 laps, 263 mi (423.257 km)
- Weather: Mostly cloudy with a temperature around 48 °F (9 °C); wind out of the NNW at 25 miles per hour (40 km/h)
- Average speed: 72.176 mph (116.156 km/h)

Pole position
Driver	Kyle Busch	Joe Gibbs Racing
- Time: 18.998

Most laps led
Driver	Jimmie Johnson	Hendrick Motorsports
- Laps: 296

Winner
No. 41	Kurt Busch	Stewart–Haas Racing

Television in the United States
- Network: Fox & MRN
- Announcers: Mike Joy, Darrell Waltrip and Larry McReynolds (Television); Joe Moore and Barney Hall (Booth); Dave Moody (Backstretch) (Radio)
- Nielsen ratings: 4.2/10 (Final); 3.8/9 (Overnight); 6.7 Million viewers

The 2014 STP 500 was a NASCAR Sprint Cup Series stock car race that was held on March 30, 2014, at Martinsville Speedway in Ridgeway, Virginia. Contested over 500 laps on the 0.526 miles (0.847 km) oval, it was the sixth race of the 2014 NASCAR Sprint Cup Series. Kurt Busch won the race, his first win with Stewart–Haas Racing, breaking an 83-race winless streak. Jimmie Johnson finished second, while Dale Earnhardt Jr., Joey Logano, and Marcos Ambrose rounded out the top five. The top rookies of the race were Austin Dillon (15th), Justin Allgaier (23rd), and Kyle Larson (27th).

== Previous week's race ==
On the final lap of the Auto Club 400, Kyle Busch passed his brother Kurt Busch and held off a hard charging rookie Kyle Larson to win the race. "Holy cow, what do you expect when you have a green-white-checkered finish and everyone comes down pit road to put on four tires," Busch said. "That's a Days of Thunder thing right there. What do you mean, there's two laps to go, everybody is to pit, Cole. I came off the fourth turn in disbelief that we won this thing, because we were mediocre all day. It was really weird for us, not a race that we're typically used to. But now there's a load off your shoulders that you can go out the rest of the season and race the way you want to." After winning his first Nationwide Series race the previous day, Larson stated that it had "been a really good weekend" and that he had been battling "probably a 12th place car for most of the day".

== Report ==
=== Background ===
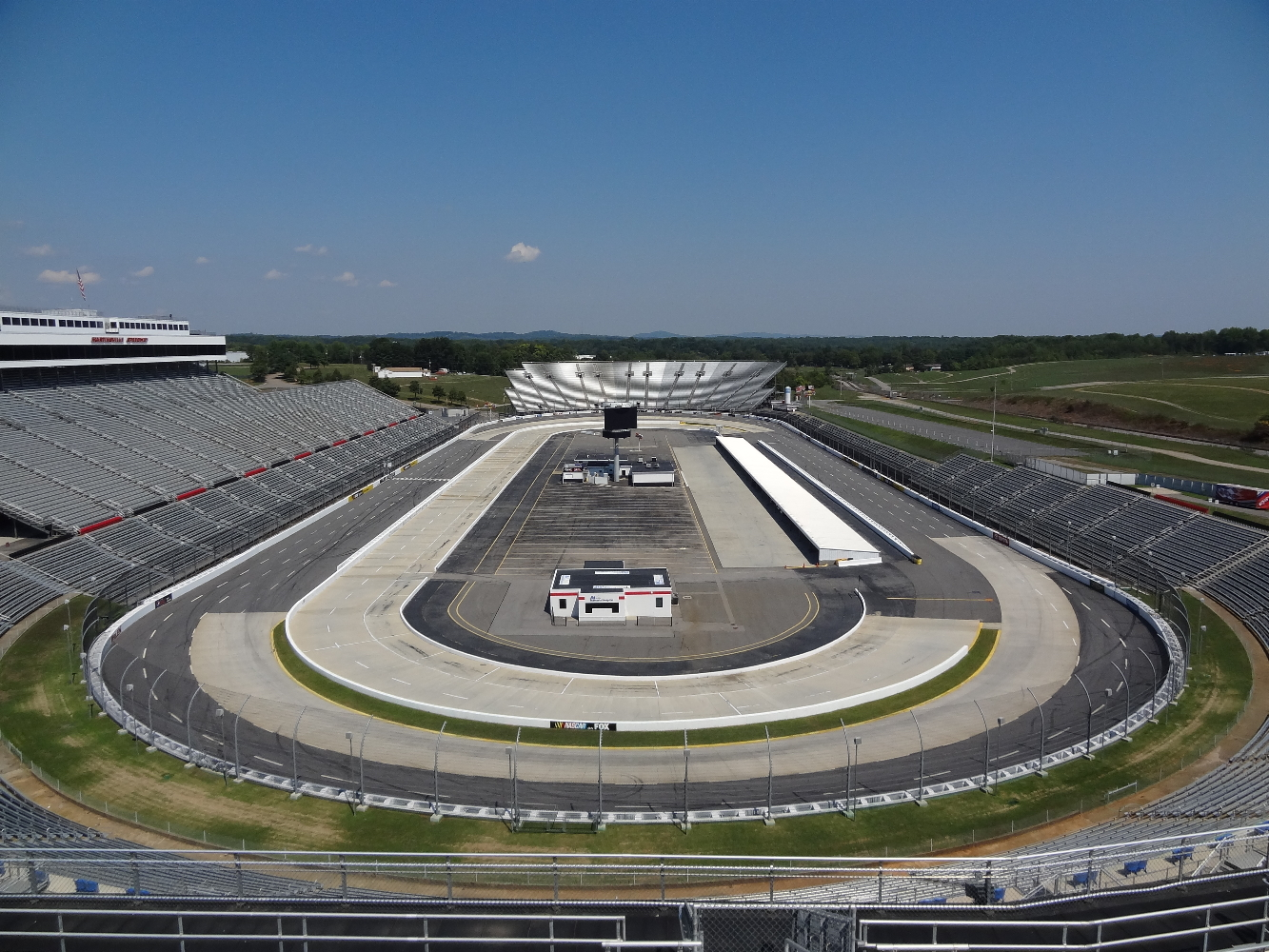
Martinsville Speedway, the race track where the race was held.

The track, Martinsville Speedway, is a four-turn short track that is 0.526 miles (0.847 km) long. The track's turns are banked at eleven degrees, while the front stretch, the location of the finish line, has a zero degree banking. Like the front stretch, the backstraightaway also doesn't have a banked surface. The race consisted of 500 laps, equivalent to a race distance of 263 miles (423 km). The defending race winner was Jimmie Johnson.

=== Entry list ===
The entry list for the STP 500 was released on Monday, March 24 at 9:03 a.m. Eastern time. Forty-four drivers were entered for the race.

No.	Driver	Team	Manufacturer
1	Jamie McMurray	Chip Ganassi Racing	Chevrolet
2	Brad Keselowski (PC2)	Team Penske	Ford
3	Austin Dillon (R)	Richard Childress Racing	Chevrolet
4	Kevin Harvick	Stewart–Haas Racing	Chevrolet
5	Kasey Kahne	Hendrick Motorsports	Chevrolet
7	Michael Annett (R)	Tommy Baldwin Racing	Chevrolet
9	Marcos Ambrose	Richard Petty Motorsports	Ford
10	Danica Patrick	Stewart–Haas Racing	Chevrolet
11	Denny Hamlin	Joe Gibbs Racing	Toyota
13	Casey Mears	Germain Racing	Chevrolet
14	Tony Stewart (PC3)	Stewart–Haas Racing	Chevrolet
15	Clint Bowyer	Michael Waltrip Racing	Toyota
16	Greg Biffle	Roush Fenway Racing	Ford
17	Ricky Stenhouse Jr.	Roush Fenway Racing	Ford
18	Kyle Busch	Joe Gibbs Racing	Toyota
20	Matt Kenseth (PC5)	Joe Gibbs Racing	Toyota
22	Joey Logano	Team Penske	Ford
23	Alex Bowman (R)	BK Racing	Toyota
24	Jeff Gordon (PC6)	Hendrick Motorsports	Chevrolet
26	Cole Whitt (R)	Swan Racing	Toyota
27	Paul Menard	Richard Childress Racing	Chevrolet
30	Parker Kligerman (R)	Swan Racing	Toyota
31	Ryan Newman	Richard Childress Racing	Chevrolet
32	Travis Kvapil	Go FAS Racing	Ford
33	David Stremme	Circle Sport	Chevrolet
34	David Ragan	Front Row Motorsports	Ford
35	David Reutimann	Front Row Motorsports	Ford
36	Reed Sorenson	Tommy Baldwin Racing	Chevrolet
38	David Gilliland	Front Row Motorsports	Ford
40	Landon Cassill (i)	Circle Sport	Chevrolet
41	Kurt Busch (PC4)	Stewart–Haas Racing	Chevrolet
42	Kyle Larson (R)	Chip Ganassi Racing	Chevrolet
43	Aric Almirola	Richard Petty Motorsports	Ford
47	A. J. Allmendinger	JTG Daugherty Racing	Chevrolet
48	Jimmie Johnson (PC1)	Hendrick Motorsports	Chevrolet
51	Justin Allgaier (R)	HScott Motorsports	Chevrolet
55	Brian Vickers	Michael Waltrip Racing	Toyota
66	Joe Nemechek (i)	Michael Waltrip Racing	Toyota
78	Martin Truex Jr.	Furniture Row Racing	Chevrolet
83	Ryan Truex (R)	BK Racing	Toyota
88	Dale Earnhardt Jr.	Hendrick Motorsports	Chevrolet
95	Michael McDowell	Leavine Family Racing	Ford
98	Josh Wise	Phil Parsons Racing	Chevrolet
99	Carl Edwards	Roush Fenway Racing	Ford
Official entry list

Key	Meaning
(R)	Rookie
(i)	Ineligible for points
(PC#)	Past champions provisional

== Practice ==
Denny Hamlin was the fastest in the first and ultimately, only practice session of the weekend with a time of 18.932 and a speed of 100.021 mph (160.968 km/h).

Pos	No.	Driver	Team	Manufacturer	Time	Speed
1	11	Denny Hamlin	Joe Gibbs Racing	Toyota	18.932	100.021
2	22	Joey Logano	Team Penske	Ford	19.067	99.313
3	20	Matt Kenseth	Joe Gibbs Racing	Toyota	19.094	99.173
Official first practice results

== Qualifying ==
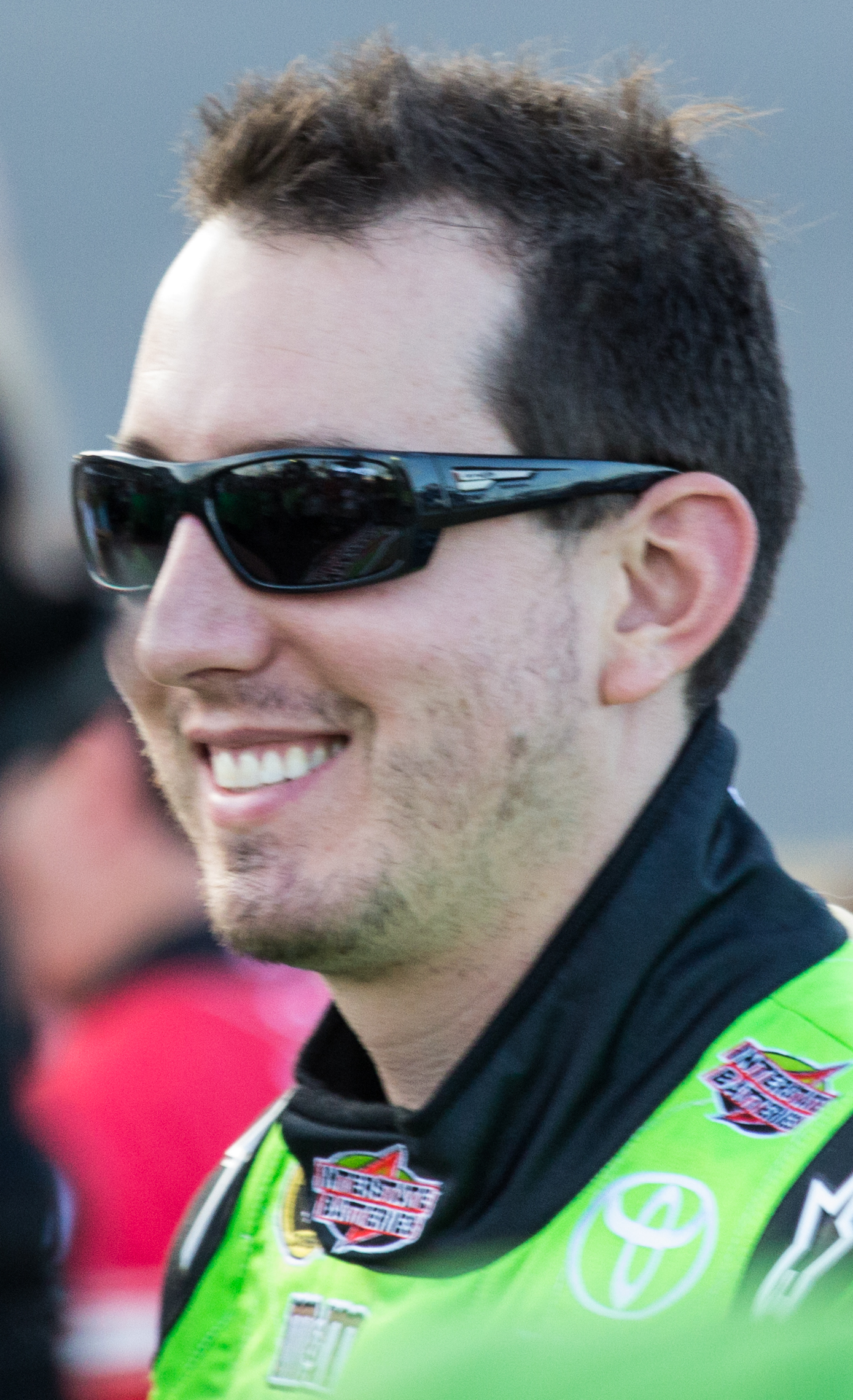
Kyle Busch scored the pole position.

Kyle Busch won the pole with a time of 18.998 and a speed of 99.674 mph (160.410 km/h). Busch felt that his car seemed "to be working well right now, whatever is working" but felt that he had "to be a little bit faster. There's still some speed to be gained and some consistency throughout races as well keeping speed throughout a run. There's room for improvement still". David Reutimann failed to qualify for the race. Rain washed out the two other practice sessions that were due to be held the day before the race.

=== Qualifying results ===
Pos	No.	Driver	Team	Manufacturer	R1	R2
1	18	Kyle Busch	Joe Gibbs Racing	Toyota	19.008	18.988
2	11	Denny Hamlin	Joe Gibbs Racing	Toyota	18.960	19.022
3	22	Joey Logano	Team Penske	Ford	18.898	19.045
4	48	Jimmie Johnson	Hendrick Motorsports	Chevrolet	19.053	19.093
5	24	Jeff Gordon	Hendrick Motorsports	Chevrolet	19.048	19.118
6	20	Matt Kenseth	Joe Gibbs Racing	Toyota	19.037	19.118
7	14	Tony Stewart	Stewart–Haas Racing	Chevrolet	19.133	19.150
8	99	Carl Edwards	Roush Fenway Racing	Ford	19.057	19.157
9	1	Jamie McMurray	Chip Ganassi Racing	Chevrolet	19.018	19.200
10	10	Danica Patrick	Stewart–Haas Racing	Chevrolet	19.096	19.290
11	16	Greg Biffle	Roush Fenway Racing	Ford	19.089	19.369
12	15	Clint Bowyer	Michael Waltrip Racing	Toyota	19.074	19.445
13	55	Brian Vickers	Michael Waltrip Racing	Toyota	19.134	—
14	2	Brad Keselowski	Team Penske	Ford	19.141	—
15	47	A. J. Allmendinger	JTG Daugherty Racing	Chevrolet	19.149	—
16	31	Ryan Newman	Richard Childress Racing	Chevrolet	19.151	—
17	9	Marcos Ambrose	Richard Petty Motorsports	Ford	19.183	—
18	4	Kevin Harvick	Stewart–Haas Racing	Chevrolet	19.184	—
19	23	Alex Bowman (R)	BK Racing	Toyota	19.193	—
20	43	Aric Almirola	Richard Petty Motorsports	Ford	19.200	—
21	27	Paul Menard	Richard Childress Racing	Chevrolet	19.203	—
22	41	Kurt Busch	Stewart–Haas Racing	Chevrolet	19.203	—
23	13	Casey Mears	Germain Racing	Chevrolet	19.205	—
24	34	David Ragan	Front Row Motorsports	Ford	19.205	—
25	51	Justin Allgaier (R)	HScott Motorsports	Chevrolet	19.238	—
26	88	Dale Earnhardt Jr.	Hendrick Motorsports	Chevrolet	19.248	—
27	5	Kasey Kahne	Hendrick Motorsports	Chevrolet	19.252	—
28	42	Kyle Larson (R)	Chip Ganassi Racing	Chevrolet	19.257	—
29	32	Travis Kvapil	Go FAS Racing	Ford	19.274	—
30	17	Ricky Stenhouse Jr.	Roush Fenway Racing	Ford	19.282	—
31	78	Martin Truex Jr.	Furniture Row Racing	Chevrolet	19.283	—
32	95	Michael McDowell	Leavine Family Racing	Toyota	19.322	—
33	98	Josh Wise	Phil Parsons Racing	Chevrolet	19.331	—
34	3	Austin Dillon (R)	Richard Childress Racing	Chevrolet	19.345	—
35	26	Cole Whitt (R)	Swan Racing	Toyota	19.358	—
36	40	Landon Cassill	Circle Sport	Chevrolet	19.370 (Note: Landon Cassill and David Reutimann both set a lap time of 19.370 in Round 1 for 36th position, the final guaranteed starting spot. As Cassill's team was higher in owner's points, Cassill qualified for the race at the expense of Reutimann, since his team was lowest in owner's points of those whose times were outside the top 36.)	—
37	33	David Stremme	Circle Sport	Chevrolet	19.385	—
38	83	Ryan Truex (R)	BK Racing	Toyota	19.402	—
39	38	David Gilliland	Front Row Motorsports	Ford	19.430	—
40	7	Michael Annett (R)	Tommy Baldwin Racing	Chevrolet	19.478	—
41	30	Parker Kligerman (R)	Swan Racing	Toyota	19.506	—
42	36	Reed Sorenson	Tommy Baldwin Racing	Chevrolet	19.511	—
43	66	Joe Nemechek	Identity Ventures Racing	Toyota	19.657	—
Did not qualify
44	35	David Reutimann	Front Row Motorsports	Ford	19.370	—
Official qualifying results

== Race ==
=== First half ===
==== Start ====
The race began at 1:13 p.m. Eastern time with Kyle Busch leading the field to the green flag from the outside line on the initial start. With the tight confines of Martinsville, it did not take long for the first caution of the race to wave. It flew on lap 2 after Parker Kligerman hit the back of Martin Truex Jr. and spun out in turn 3. A number of cars towards the back were on pit road for damage sustained in a classic Martinsville accordion effect. The race restarted on lap 11, before Matt Kenseth took the lead on lap 17. Jimmie Johnson took the lead on lap 21 and held the lead to the competition caution on lap 41 due to overnight rain. Travis Kvapil stayed out to lead a lap before giving the lead back to Johnson. Brad Keselowski was exiting pit road when he collided with Kasey Kahne who was entering. The bulk of the damage came when Kurt Busch clipped the right side of Keselowski's car. He was forced to take his car to the garage. Keselowski felt that Busch "just accelerated and drove through us, absolutely drove through us" and that he was "tired of his recklessness".

==== Tempers flaring ====
The race restarted on lap 48, with Kenseth retaking the lead on lap 56. Kyle Busch took back the lead on lap 59, before the lead cycled to Joey Logano on lap 65, and back to Johnson on lap 82. Keselowski returned to the track for a payback move at Kurt Busch; he gave out the middle finger until Kurt Busch bumped him out of the way. Keselowski's car ultimately left a tire mark on the left side of Kurt Busch's car. After the race, Kurt Busch stated that he had "steered right to go around Brad and he clobbers our left-side door" and later described Keselowski's move as "punk-ass" and that he "will get what he gets back when I decide to give it back". The two drivers battled for 17 laps in total. Ricky Stenhouse Jr. wheel-hopped the curb in turn 1 trying to avoid ramming Kurt Busch and scraped the wall, which brought out the third caution of the race on lap 103. Matt Kenseth beat Jimmie Johnson off pit road to take the lead for the restart, on lap 110.

==== Cautions breed cautions ====
Logano took back the lead on lap 111, before the fourth caution of the race flew on lap 114 after Kvapil clipped Michael Annett going into turn 3, with the incident also involving David Gilliland. From the restart at lap 120, Logano maintained the lead until lap 133, when Johnson returned to the head of the race. Greg Biffle became the race's next leader on lap 155, and held the lead until the fifth caution of the race flew on lap 170 after Casey Mears got tapped by Gilliland in turn 1 and sent him spinning. Marcos Ambrose beat Biffle off pit road to take the lead for the restart on lap 179. Ambrose led until on lap 195 when Kenseth passed him. The sixth caution of the race flew on lap 200 after Dale Earnhardt Jr. tapped Jamie McMurray in turn 2 and sent his car into the wall. Kenseth led the field to the restart on lap 208, before Johnson returned to the lead on lap 213.

=== Second half ===
==== Halfway ====
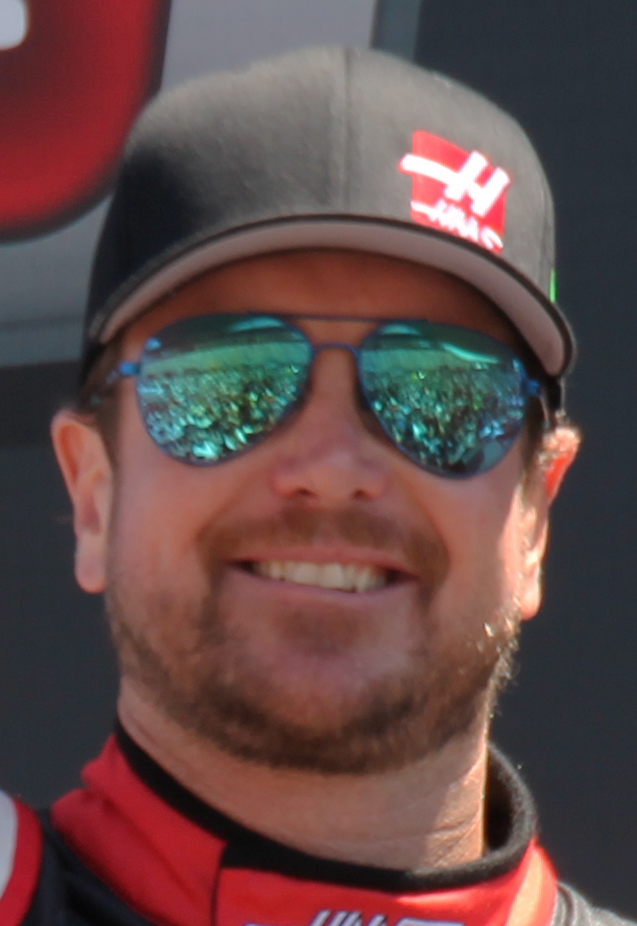
Kurt Busch won the race.

The seventh caution of the race flew on lap 219 after Alex Bowman got hit in the rear by Gilliland and rear-ended the wall in turn 4. Earnhardt Jr. stayed out on track while others pitted for tires, and thus took the lead for the restart, on lap 226. A short green-flag run followed before debris in turn 1 brought out the eighth caution of the race on lap 231. Kevin Harvick's run of mechanical mishaps continued when he was forced to pit because of a broken rear-end chain. Earnhardt Jr. still led the field for the restart on lap 238, before Kurt Busch took the lead on lap 243. Johnson returned to the front on lap 245, before the ninth caution of the race flew at the halfway mark, after Ryan Truex was sent spinning into the turn 4 wall. Harvick stayed out to lead a lap before pitting and the lead cycled back to Kenseth for the restart, on lap 258.

==== Closing stages ====
Earnhardt Jr. took back the lead on lap 260, before Johnson (lap 265) and Clint Bowyer (lap 284) both went to the head of the race. Johnson retook the lead on lap 288, and held the top spot until the next caution, the 10th, flew on lap 315 after Joe Nemechek hit the wall in turn 4. The race restarted on lap 323, and Johnson stayed out front until the 11th caution of the race flew on lap 340 after Kyle Larson got loose and spun out exiting turn 2. The race restarted on lap 347, with Bowyer and Johnson swapping the lead before a piece of debris brought out the 12th caution of the race on lap 349. Johnson maintained the lead from the restart on lap 358 to the 13th caution of the race, which flew with 90 laps to go after Martin Truex Jr. got turned by Keselowski in turn 2.

===== Finish =====
The race restarted with 83 laps to go, with Johnson leading until 51 laps to go, when Bowyer assumed the lead. The 14th caution of the race flew with 42 laps to go after Carl Edwards got loose and spun out in turn 2. Bowyer and Johnson swapped the lead on pit road, as Johnson won the race off to take the lead. The race restarted with 35 laps to go, and was passed by Kurt Busch 7 laps later. Johnson had another spell out front with 18 laps to go, but Kurt Busch took the lead back with 11 laps to go and held off Johnson to end his 83-race winless streak, and achieved his 25th career victory. Busch stated that he "didn't know if we'd be able to do it, you know? The 48 car is king here, him or the 24", and that he had "been on this journey for a while and every time you come to Martinsville, you just kind of draw a line through it like there's no way I'll be able to challenge those Hendrick guys or be up in the top 10. This Stewart-Haas team gave me a car to do it." Johnson, who led 296 laps, stated that his car was "so on edge slipping and sliding" and that a "lack of security in our own car kept us from feeling more racy and putting a bumper to someone or really getting inside someone aggressively".

=== Race results ===
Pos	No.	Driver	Team	Manufacturer	Laps	Points
1	41	Kurt Busch	Stewart–Haas Racing	Chevrolet	500	47
2	48	Jimmie Johnson	Hendrick Motorsports	Chevrolet	500	44
3	88	Dale Earnhardt Jr.	Hendrick Motorsports	Chevrolet	500	42
4	22	Joey Logano	Team Penske	Ford	500	41
5	9	Marcos Ambrose	Richard Petty Motorsports	Ford	500	40
6	20	Matt Kenseth	Joe Gibbs Racing	Toyota	500	39
7	4	Kevin Harvick	Stewart–Haas Racing	Chevrolet	500	38
8	43	Aric Almirola	Richard Petty Motorsports	Ford	500	36
9	15	Clint Bowyer	Michael Waltrip Racing	Toyota	500	36
10	27	Paul Menard	Richard Childress Racing	Chevrolet	500	34
11	47	A. J. Allmendinger	JTG Daugherty Racing	Chevrolet	500	34
12	24	Jeff Gordon	Hendrick Motorsports	Chevrolet	500	32
13	99	Carl Edwards	Roush Fenway Racing	Ford	500	31
14	18	Kyle Busch	Joe Gibbs Racing	Toyota	500	31
15	3	Austin Dillon (R)	Richard Childress Racing	Chevrolet	500	29
16	55	Brian Vickers	Michael Waltrip Racing	Toyota	500	28
17	14	Tony Stewart	Stewart–Haas Racing	Chevrolet	500	27
18	16	Greg Biffle	Roush Fenway Racing	Ford	500	27
19	11	Denny Hamlin	Joe Gibbs Racing	Toyota	500	25
20	31	Ryan Newman	Richard Childress Racing	Chevrolet	500	24
21	78	Martin Truex Jr.	Furniture Row Racing	Chevrolet	500	23
22	5	Kasey Kahne	Hendrick Motorsports	Chevrolet	500	22
23	51	Justin Allgaier (R)	HScott Motorsports	Chevrolet	500	21
24	13	Casey Mears	Germain Racing	Chevrolet	500	20
25	40	Landon Cassill	Circle Sport	Chevrolet	500	0
26	38	David Gilliland	Front Row Motorsports	Ford	499	18
27	42	Kyle Larson (R)	Chip Ganassi Racing	Chevrolet	498	17
28	34	David Ragan	Front Row Motorsports	Ford	497	16
29	26	Cole Whitt (R)	Swan Racing	Toyota	497	15
30	83	Ryan Truex (R)	BK Racing	Toyota	496	14
31	7	Michael Annett (R)	Tommy Baldwin Racing	Chevrolet	495	13
32	10	Danica Patrick	Stewart–Haas Racing	Chevrolet	494	12
33	32	Travis Kvapil	Go FAS Racing	Ford	493	12
34	36	Reed Sorenson	Tommy Baldwin Racing	Chevrolet	492	10
35	98	Josh Wise	Phil Parsons Racing	Chevrolet	492	9
36	23	Alex Bowman (R)	BK Racing	Toyota	488	8
37	95	Michael McDowell	Leavine Family Racing	Toyota	474	7
38	2	Brad Keselowski	Team Penske	Ford	469	6
39	33	David Stremme	Circle Sport	Chevrolet	440	5
40	17	Ricky Stenhouse Jr.	Roush Fenway Racing	Ford	409	4
41	30	Parker Kligerman (R)	Swan Racing	Toyota	408	3
42	1	Jamie McMurray	Chip Ganassi Racing	Chevrolet	396	2
43	66	Joe Nemechek	Identity Ventures Racing	Toyota	310	0
Race Results

=== Race statistics ===
- Lead changes: 33 among different drivers
- Cautions/Laps: 14 for 92
- Red flags: 0
- Time of race: 3 hours, 38 minutes, and 38 seconds
- Average speed: 72.176 miles per hour (116.156 km/h)

== Media ==
=== Television ===
Fox Sports
Booth announcers	Pit reporters
Lap-by-lap: Mike Joy; Color-commentator: Larry McReynolds; Color commentator: Darrell Waltrip	Matt Yocum; Steve Byrnes; Krista Voda; Jeff Hammond

=== Radio ===
MRN Radio
Booth announcers	Turn announcers	Pit reporters
Lead announcer: Joe Moore; Announcer: Barney Hall	Backstretch: Dave Moody	Winston Kelly; Steve Post; Alex Hayden; Woody Cain

== Standings after the race ==
Drivers' Championship standings

	Pos	Driver	Points
1	1	Dale Earnhardt Jr.	227
3	2	Matt Kenseth	218 (-9)
2	3	Carl Edwards	217 (−10)
1	4	Jeff Gordon	216 (−11)
1	5	Jimmie Johnson	209 (−18)
1	6	Kyle Busch	189 (−38)
3	7	Brad Keselowski	188 (−39)
2	8	Joey Logano	187 (−40)
	9	Austin Dillon (R)	179 (−48)
2	10	Ryan Newman	174 (−53)
3	11	Paul Menard	168 (−59)
1	12	Denny Hamlin	165 (−62)
	13	Brian Vickers	165 (−62)
6	14	Marcos Ambrose	162 (−65)
2	15	Tony Stewart	154 (−73)
6	16	A. J. Allmendinger	152 (−75)

Manufacturers' Championship standings

Pos	Manufacturer	Points
1	Chevrolet	268
2	Ford	254 (−14)
3	Toyota	238 (−26)

- Note: Only the first sixteen positions are included for the driver standings.

== Notes ==
Previous race: 2014 Auto Club 400	Sprint Cup Series; 2014 season	Next race: 2014 Duck Commander 500
