= BK Racing =

Former stock car racing team

- Owners: Ron Devine; Wayne Press; Mike Wheeler
- Base: Charlotte, North Carolina
- Series: Monster Energy NASCAR Cup Series
- Race drivers: J. J. Yeley; Alex Bowman; Gray Gaulding; Blake Jones; Spencer Gallagher; Joey Gase; Alon Day
- Manufacturer: Toyota; Ford
- Opened: 2012
- Closed: 2018

Career
- Debut: 2012 Daytona 500 (Daytona)
- Latest race: 2018 Ford EcoBoost 400 (Homestead–Miami)
- Races competed: 502
- Drivers' Championships: 0
- Race victories: 0
- Pole positions: 0

BK Racing was an American professional stock car racing team that fielded entries in the NASCAR Cup Series from 2012 to 2018. It most recently fielded the No. 23 Toyota Camry and Ford Fusion for J. J. Yeley, Gray Gaulding, and other drivers. In 2018, the team was involved in a court case involving team owner Ron Devine and Union Bank & Trust Company over outstanding loans. In August of that year, after being turned over to a trustee who oversaw the team's operations, BK Racing was liquidated, with the assets going to Front Row Motorsports. However, BK Racing still fielded a car until the end of the 2018 season, with help from Front Row Motorsports and NY Racing Team.

== History ==
BK Racing's logo until 2015

BK Racing was owned by a couple of investors who were formerly involved in the ownership of TRG Motorsports Sprint Cup Series team, which closed after the 2011 season. Burger King franchise owner Ron Devine and tomato grower Wayne Press joined Thomas Uberall, former race director of the Red Bull Racing Team, to acquire the assets and race shop of the former Red Bull operation, which also closed after the 2011 season, for around $10 million.

Like Front Row Motorsports owner Bob Jenkins, principal owner Devine's many Burger King franchises allow him to advertise the brand on the cars when there is no outside sponsor. Prior to the 2012 Daytona 500, Burger King announced a "licensing agreement" with the team, authenticating the paint schemes of the 83 and 93 and the usage of the company's logos, though it is unclear whether or not the company and/or franchisee Devine funds the team. According to a 2013 Autoweek article, the partnership is limited to the licensing agreement, with Burger King not sponsoring the team. The Burger King partnership includes the branding of Dr Pepper, a soft drink served at Burger King restaurants. Dr Pepper has appeared as the primary sponsor of the team on various occasions (typically the 93 car), and expanded to a newly renumbered 23 car for 2014 (signifying the drink's 23 flavors).

In May 2014, the team expanded to three cars and added another owner and investor in Anthony Marlowe, who purchased a ten percent stake in the team. Formerly a partner in the recently exited Swan Racing, Marlowe founded outsourcing company TMone, and is currently the managing partner in Iowa City Capital Partners and its subsidiary Marlowe Companies Inc. After the 2015 season, Marlowe began the process of selling his stake in the team.

The team used engines from Triad Racing Technologies upon inception. In 2014, the team started an in-house engine program while using Triad engines on occasion. For 2016, the team purchased equipment from the recently closed Michael Waltrip Racing, and hired several former MWR employees, with increased manufacturer support from Toyota.

The team operated out of a facility in Charlotte, North Carolina, which housed former Cup Series team BAM Racing and was the base of GMS Racing until 2015.

In August 2018, BK Racing was liquidated, with most of its assets acquired by Front Row Motorsports (FRM). Other teams, including Obaika Racing and Rick Ware Racing, also received portions of the team's assets. FRM won the bankruptcy auction with a bid of US$2.08 million, surpassing GMS Racing's offer of US$1.8 million. Previously, FRM had purchased a charter from BK Racing after the 2016 season for US$2 million. This transaction is the subject of a lawsuit filed by Union Bank & Trust Company, which claims ownership of the charter due to a lien at the time of sale. On December 20, 2022, team owner Devine was ordered to pay US$31 million to the trust managing BK Racing's bankruptcy. On October 18, 2023, Devine was indicted on four counts of failing to pay payroll taxes by the U.S. Attorney's Office. Investigations revealed that some of the misused funds were used to finance the team. On January 17, 2025, an appeals court upheld the US$31 million judgment, finding that Devine used multiple corporations and family trusts as alter egos to divert approximately US$6.4 million from the team. On April 29, 2025, another appeals court upheld a separate US$2.5 million judgment. On June 11, 2025, Devine pleaded guilty to federal charges related to the 2023 payroll tax case.

== Cars ==
=== Car No. 23 history ===
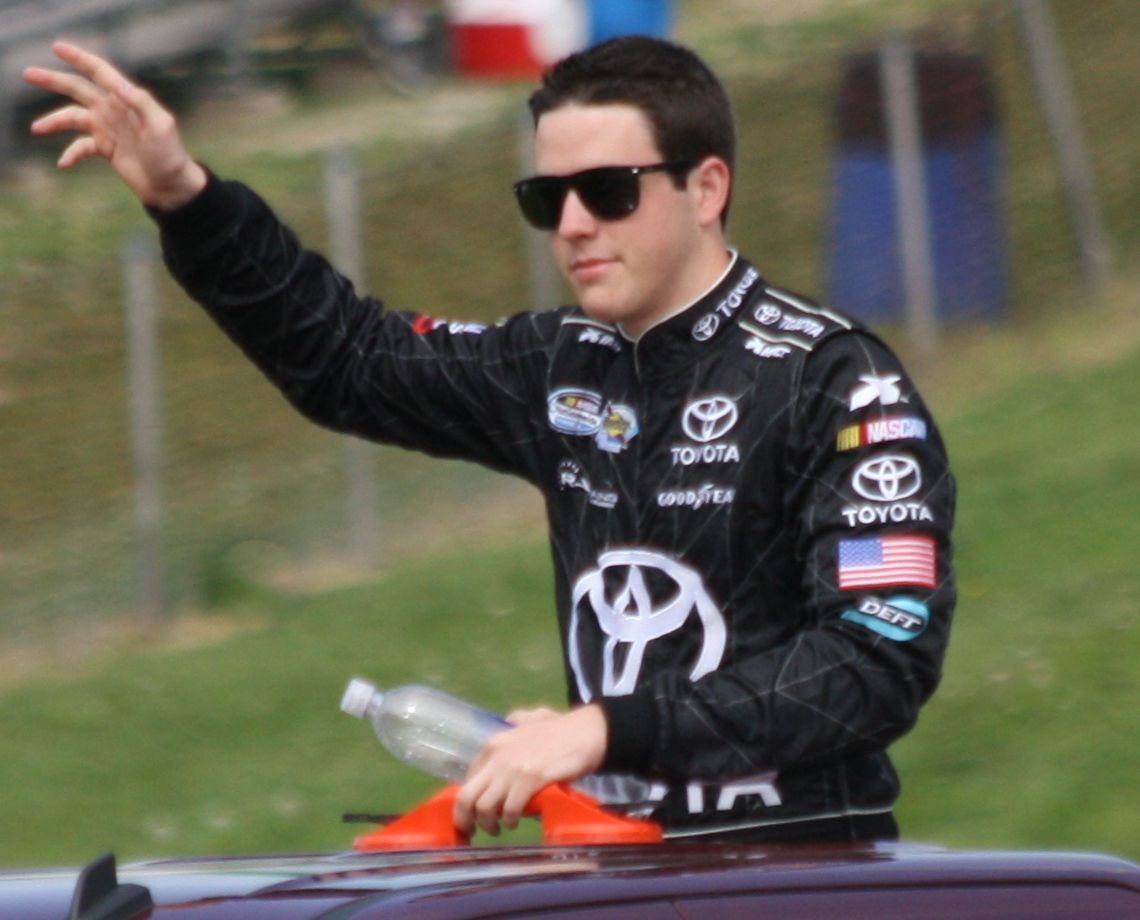
Alex Bowman was signed to drive the 23 car in 2014.

Alex Bowman (2014)

For 2014, up-and-comer Ryan Truex tested the No. 93 at Daytona. Truex would wind up in the 83, and fellow up-and-comer Alex Bowman (who had tested the 83) would take over the renumbered No. 23 to run for Rookie of the Year. Dr Pepper stepped up as the full-time primary sponsor of the car, the No. 23 applying to the soft drink's original 23 flavors. When Truex's 83 missed the Daytona 500, his sponsor Borla Exhaust moved over to the 23, which Bowman drove to a solid 23rd-place finish in his Sprint Cup debut. Houston-based Dustless Blasting came on to sponsor Bowman at Watkins Glen and the second Talladega race. In October, DipYourCar.com, a retailer of Plasti Dip automotive finish products, signed to sponsor both the 23 and 83 cars at Martinsville and Homestead. Both cars would promote the film Dumb and Dumber To at Phoenix in November, with Bowman's 23 car featuring the face of Jim Carrey's character Lloyd Christmas. Bowman finished 2014 35th in the driver points, while the No. 23 slipped again to 36th in the owner points.

J. J. Yeley (2015)

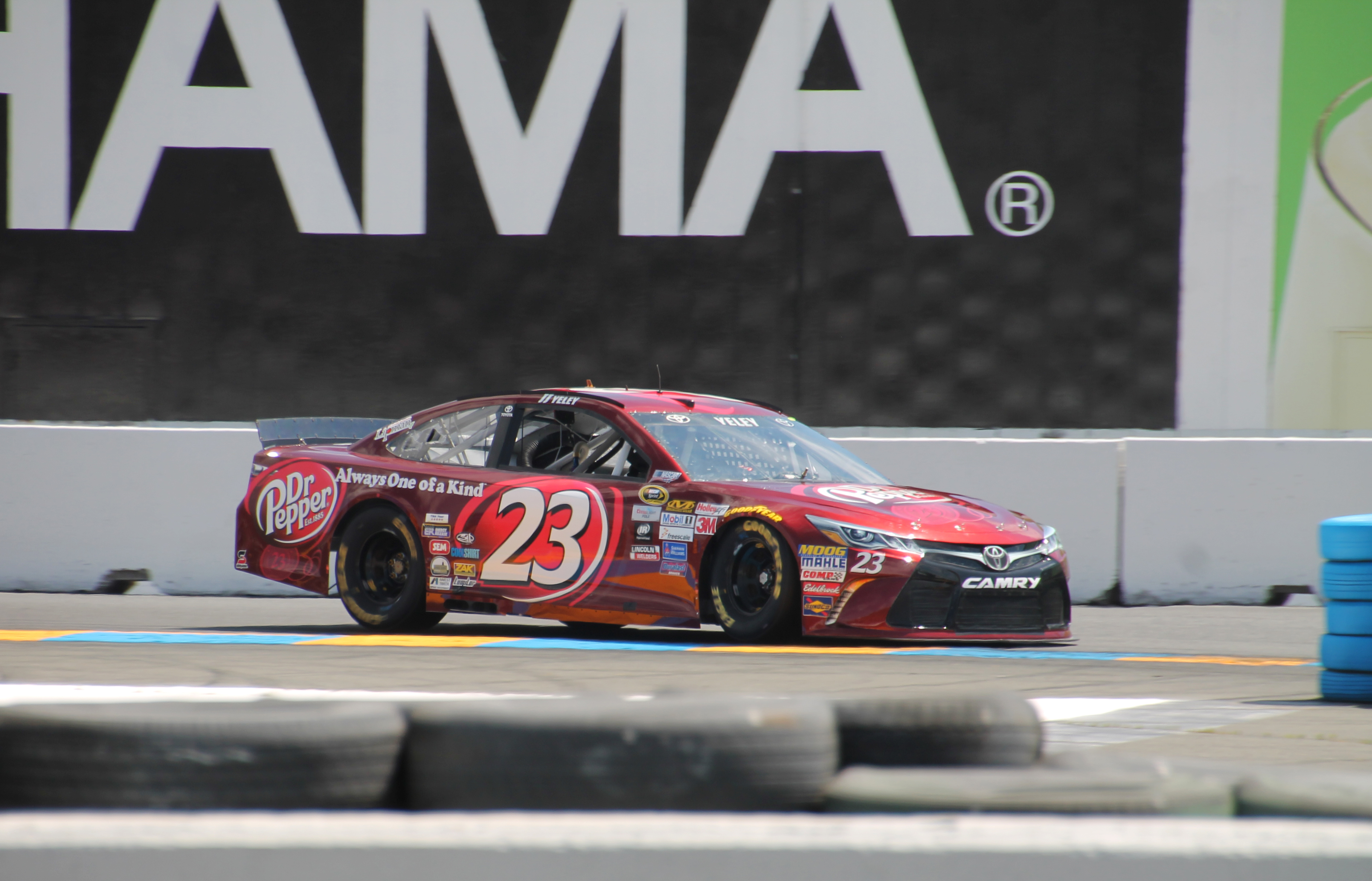
J. J. Yeley at Sonoma in 2015.

On January 27, 2015, it was announced that J. J. Yeley, who had been the interim driver of the No. 83 following Ryan Truex's release in late 2014, would be joining the team full-time. It was subsequently revealed that Yeley would be driving the No. 23, with Bowman departing for Tommy Baldwin Racing. At Richmond in April, Yeley gave up his seat to teammate Jeb Burton after Burton failed to qualify his ESTES-sponsored 26 car. In August, prior to the fall race at Darlington, it was announced that Yeley and Burton would switch rides on a permanent basis. Also for Darlington, the team unveiled a retro scheme to honor Burton's father Ward, with the ESTES-sponsored Toyota replicating the Caterpillar Inc. cars Ward drove for Bill Davis Racing. After making his first seven attempts in the No. 23, Burton failed to qualify at Talladega; this is the first time the No. 23 has failed to qualify. Burton would qualify for the next three races before missing the race again in the season-finale at Homestead. Burton would finish the season 38th in the driver points and third in the Rookie of the Year standings, while the No. 23 slipped once again to 40th in the owner points.

David Ragan (2016)

Yeley and Burton were both released from the team at the end of 2015. On January 25, 2016, the team announced that David Ragan would take over the No. 23 full-time in 2016. Ragan was sponsored by Dr Pepper outside of the Toyota Owners 400 at Richmond, where he was sponsored by Sweet Frog, and the Pennsylvania 400 at Pocono, where he was sponsored by USA Network to promote the network's upcoming NASCAR broadcasts while NBC is airing the Summer Olympics. Ragan's contract with BK was not renewed after the 2016 season.

Multiple drivers (2017-2018)

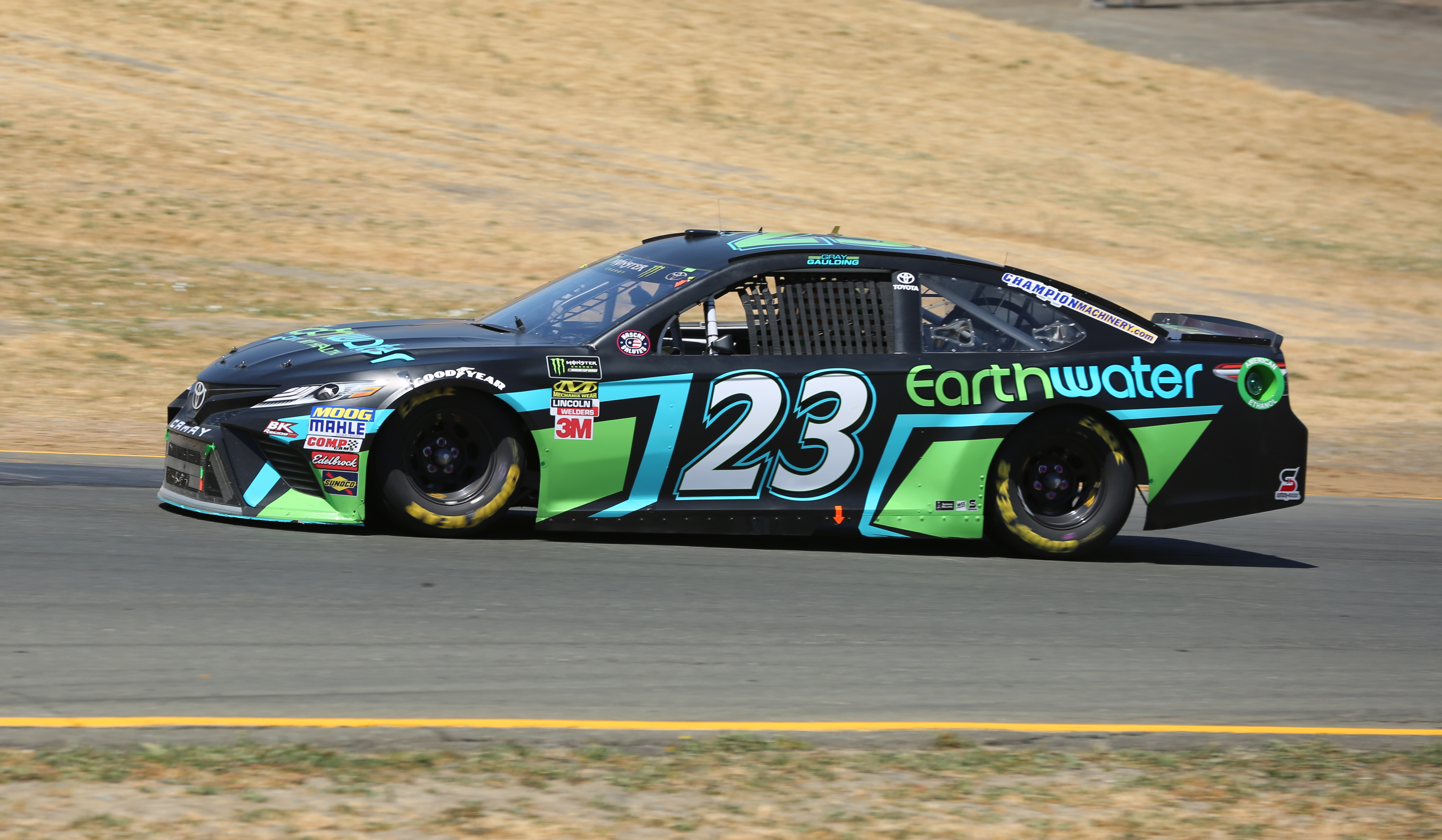
Gray Gaulding in the No. 23 at Sonoma in 2018

In 2017, Joey Gase joined the No. 23 team for three races starting at the Daytona 500. Gray Gaulding was later announced as the driver of the car for the other 33 races, running for Rookie of the Year. Gaulding will run some races in the 83. The only race he did not run was the Daytona 500, since NASCAR would not approve him due to the lack of superspeedway experience. Later in the season, Ryan Sieg joined the team at Michigan in June, and NASCAR Whelen Euro Series driver Alon Day joined the team to make his Cup Series debut at Sonoma. In June, Gaulding was released from the team because of financial issues, although he returned to BK for Darlington but in the No. 83 team. On September 22, Day returned to the No. 23 car at Richmond.

The No. 23 team ran the 2018 season with Gaulding, Yeley, Gase, Day, Blake Jones, and Spencer Gallagher. At the same time, the team filed for Chapter 11 bankruptcy and team owner Ron Devine was stripped of ownership in favor of a trustee. The #23 became a single-car team run by the trustee who formed a partnership with NY Racing Team to keep fielding the #23 as the 2018 season went on. Eventually, the #23 was sold in a bankruptcy auction to Front Row Motorsports and the primary driver for the rest of the season became JJ Yeley, the normal driver of NY Racing. At the Talladega, the team switched to the Ford Fusion for the race. The team reverted to Toyota at the Hollywood Casino 400 at Kansas. For their final race at the Homestead, the team once again reverted to the Fusion with Yeley behind the wheel.

The No. 23 did not return to Cup in 2019, being renumbered by Front Row Motorsports to the No. 36, with driver Matt Tifft. At the same time, Front Row ended their partnership with NY Racing Team and J. J. Yeley.

==== Car No. 23 results ====
Year	Driver	No.	Make	1	2	3	4	5	6	7	8	9	10	11	12	13	14	15	16	17	18	19	20	21	22	23	24	25	26	27	28	29	30	31	32	33	34	35	36	Owners	Pts
2014	Alex Bowman	23	Toyota	DAY; 23	PHO; 41	LVS; 37	BRI; 32	CAL; 22	MAR; 36	TEX; 32	DAR; 29	RCH; 28	TAL; 28	KAN; 35	CLT; 33	DOV; 40	POC; 31	MCH; 40	SON; 29	KEN; 36	DAY; 13	NHA; 31	IND; 40	POC; 31	GLN; 36	MCH; 26	BRI; 32	ATL; 35	RCH; 38	CHI; 35	NHA; 28	DOV; 34	KAN; 32	CLT; 30	TAL; 43	MAR; 29	TEX; 42	PHO; 32	HOM; 33	36th	412
2015	J. J. Yeley	23	Toyota	DAY; 40	ATL; 34	LVS; 36	PHO; 31	CAL; 37	MAR; 26	TEX; 43	BRI; 32	RCH; QL^{‡}	TAL; 14	KAN; 37	CLT; 38	DOV; 29	POC; 36	MCH; 38	SON; 41	DAY; 33	KEN; 39	NHA; 43	IND; 39	POC; 30	GLN; 30	MCH; 38	BRI; 34													40th	302
2015	Jeb Burton	23	Toyota									RCH; 38																DAR; 31	RCH; 39	CHI; 38	NHA; 33	DOV; 43	CLT; 41	KAN; 37	TAL; DNQ	MAR; 27	TEX; 32	PHO; 39	HOM; DNQ	40th	302
2016	David Ragan	23	Toyota	DAY; 29	ATL; 32	LVS; 32	PHO; 24	CAL; 22	MAR; 21	TEX; 33	BRI; 39	RCH; 23	TAL; 34	KAN; 29	DOV; 17	CLT; 31	POC; 23	MCH; 22	SON; 32	DAY; 16	KEN; 22	NHA; 30	IND; 37	POC; 32	GLN; 33	BRI; 21	MCH; 29	DAR; 21	RCH; 34	CHI; 35	NHA; 32	DOV; 30	CLT; 23	KAN; 36	TAL; 24	MAR; 37	TEX; 33	PHO; 31	HOM; 29	34th	455
2017	Joey Gase	23	Toyota	DAY; 23																	KEN; 36						BRI; 34							TAL; 32						35th	230
2017	Gray Gaulding	23	Toyota		ATL; 37	LVS; 34	PHO; 36	CAL; 37	MAR; 29	TEX; 34	BRI; 29	RCH; 31	TAL; 20	KAN; 34	CLT; 27	DOV; 24	POC; 29												RCH; 35											35th	230
2017	Ryan Sieg	23	Toyota															MCH; 33																						35th	230
2017	Alon Day	23	Toyota																SON; 32																					35th	230
2017	Corey LaJoie	23	Toyota																	DAY; 11		NHA; 31	IND; 40	POC; 25	GLN; 33	MCH; 31		DAR; 28		CHI; 36	NHA; 27	DOV; 34	CLT; 28		KAN; 27	MAR; 33	TEX; 39	PHO; 31	HOM; 31	35th	230
2018	Gray Gaulding	23	Toyota	DAY; 20	ATL; 36	LVS; 33	PHO; 34	CAL; 32	MAR; 36	TEX; 20	BRI; 31	RCH; 35	TAL; 24	DOV; 30	KAN; 29	CLT; 31	POC; 33	MCH; 31	SON; 30	CHI; 31																				35th	229
2018	Blake Jones	23	Toyota																				NHA; 33			MCH; 30	BRI; 27													35th	229
2018	Spencer Gallagher	23	Toyota																						GLN; 35															35th	229
2018	Joey Gase	23	Toyota																									DAR; 40												35th	229
2018	Alon Day	23	Toyota																												RCH; 38									35th	229
2018	J. J. Yeley	23	Toyota																		DAY; 18	KEN; 39		POC; 28					IND; 29	LVS; 17		CLT; 28	DOV; 32		KAN; 31	MAR; 31	TEX; 36	PHO; 38		35th	229
2018	J. J. Yeley	23	Ford																															TAL; 36					HOM; 32	35th	229
^{‡} - Qualified but replaced by Jeb Burton

=== Car No. 26 history ===
Cole Whitt (2014)

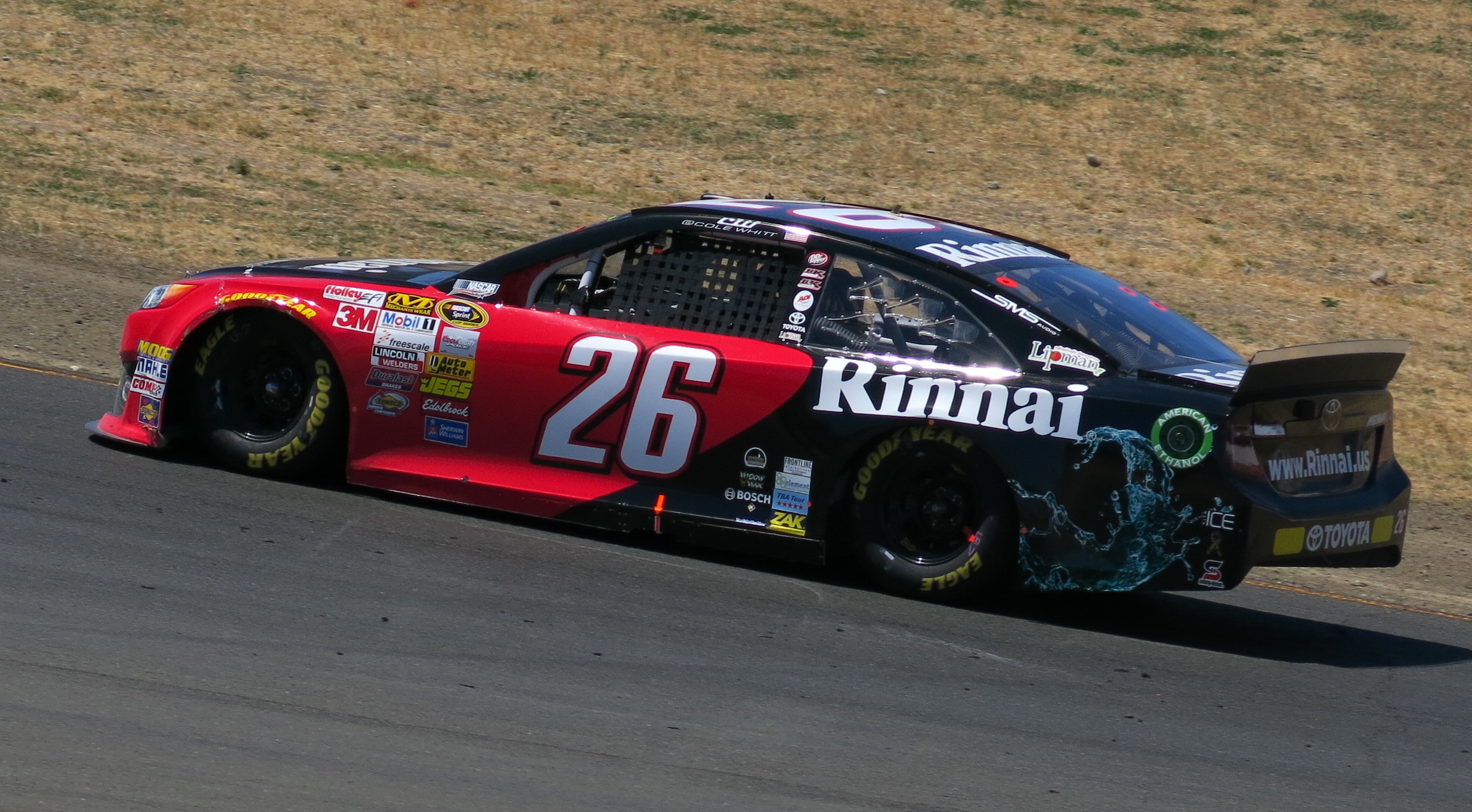
Cole Whitt in the No. 26 at Sonoma in 2014

On April 23, 2014, during a two-week hiatus between the spring Darlington and Richmond races, it was announced that Anthony Marlowe had acquired the No. 26 team from Swan Racing and merged his ownership with BK Racing. The 26 team's driver Cole Whitt was carried over in the transaction, with Marlowe being listed as the owner on the No. 26. The team inherited Swan Racing's Speed Stick GEAR sponsorship, and the company proceeded to extend their sponsorship for six additional races starting at the Coca-Cola 600. Additional sponsors (that were absent when Whitt and Marlowe were with Swan Racing), came on race by race, leaving only two races to be filled by Burger King logos. Scorpyd Crossbows joined the team for its first two races under the BK Banner. Iowa Chop House partnered with the team at Kansas. Rinnai Water Heaters came on to sponsor the team at Sonoma, then returned for Atlanta and Loudon. Scorpion Window Film sponsored the car at Daytona in July. Axxess Pharma and their TapouT Muscle Recovery brand signed on for multiple races in June, starting with the first New Hampshire race. Anthony Marlowe's Iowa City Capital Partners came on to back the car at Michigan and Chicagoland. At Watkins Glen, local New York winery Bully Hill Vineyards sponsored the 26. A strong road course racer, Whitt qualified a solid 18th and was running in 19th when his brakes failed entering turn 1, sending him into the distant tire barrier in an eerily similar fashion as Jimmie Johnson's notorious Busch Series crash in 2000.

At Richmond in September, Standard Plumbing Company signed on to sponsor. Uponor would sponsor the fall races at Dover and Martinsville, the latter of which resulted in an 18th-place finish. Moen was on the car for the second Kansas race. At Talladega, with Bad Boy Mowers sponsoring, Whitt led his first lap in Sprint Cup competition after staying out under caution. He would go on to post his then-career-best finish of 15th in the race. Fuelxx was on the hood for the penultimate race at Phoenix, unfortunately Whitt would be caught up in a mid-race wreck after an earlier parts failure. Whitt and the No. 26 finished the season 31st in both driver and owner points. Whitt did not return to the No. 26 for the 2015 season, moving to the No. 35 at Front Row Motorsports.

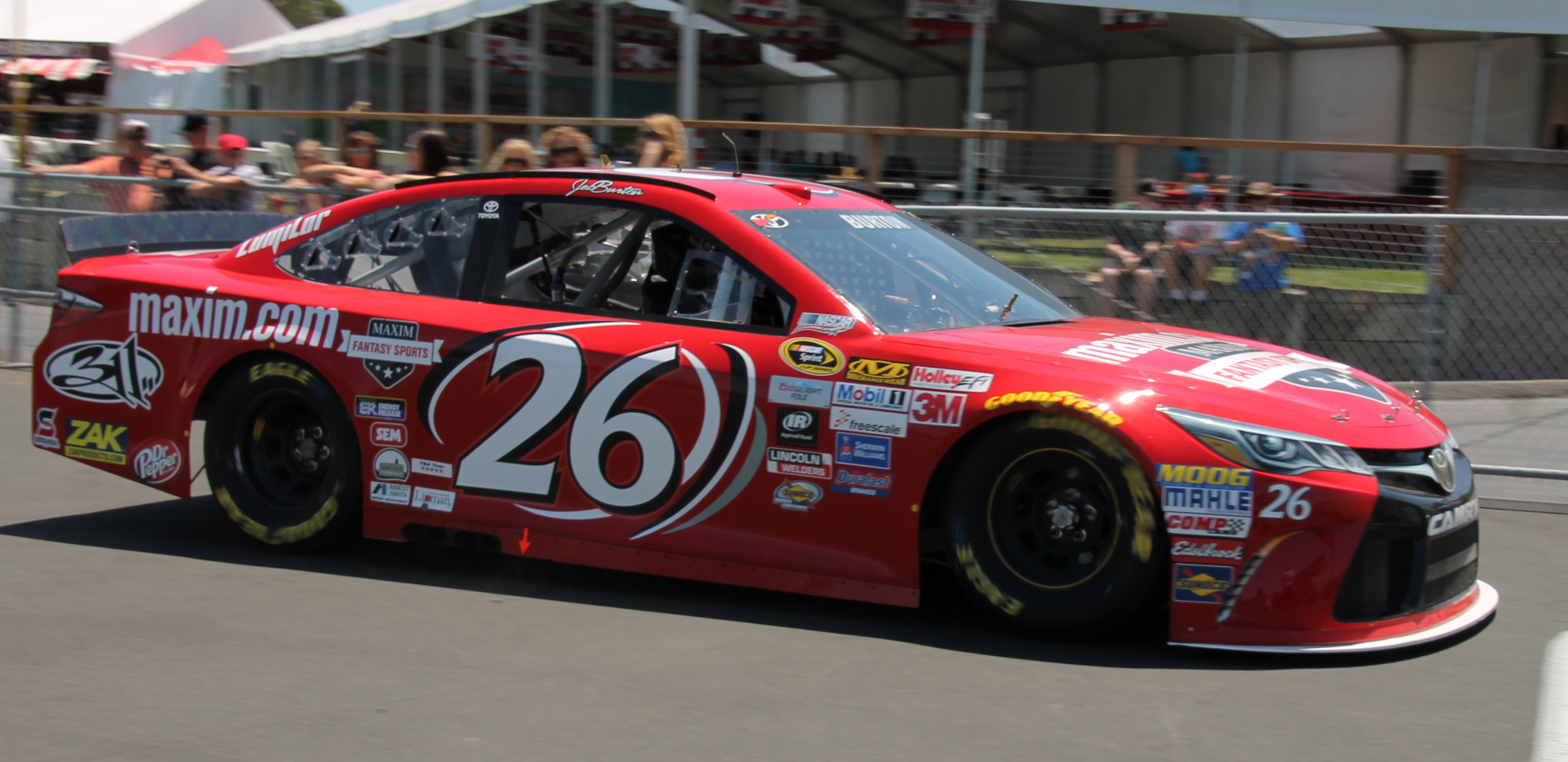
Jeb Burton at Sonoma in 2015.

Jeb Burton (2015)

On February 8, 2015, the team announced that former Camping World Truck Series driver Jeb Burton would be the replacement for Whitt and would compete for the series Rookie of the Year award. Burton failed to qualify for the Daytona 500 after being involved in an accident during his Duel qualifying race. Burton would qualify for the next five races afterward, before failing to qualify at Texas. Shortly afterward, Estes Express Lines, who had sponsored Burton at ThorSport Racing in the Truck Series, announced that they would sponsor the No. 26 beginning at Richmond. When he failed to qualify at Richmond in April, Burton and Estes moved to the 23 for one race, supplanting J. J. Yeley and regular BK sponsor Maxim Fantasy Sports. Burton failed to qualify for seven of the first 24 races in 2015, leading the team to put him in the 23 car (which was higher in owner points) for the remainder of the season beginning at Darlington. Yeley would take over the 26. In his first race in the 26, needing to qualify on speed, Yeley was able to run 36th to make the field. He finished 34th. After Yeley ran Richmond and Chicagoland, qualifying for both races, Josh Wise stepped in for a single race at New Hampshire, due to Yeley's driving duties with JGL Racing in the Xfinity Series. Yeley returned at Dover. At Charlotte, being required to qualify on speed for the first time since Darlington, Yeley was once again able to make the field, this time in 35th place. Yeley qualified on speed at Kansas and Talladega as well, with the latter being his best start in the No. 26, at 30th place. Ultimately, the No. 26 would not miss a race in the final third of the season, but still tumbled to 43rd in the owner points; Yeley was ineligible for driver points in the Sprint Cup Series as he had declared for the Xfinity Series at the start of the year.

Burton and Yeley were both released from BK Racing at the end of 2015. With the team reportedly only eligible for two guaranteed starting spots under a proposed revision to NASCAR's qualifying system, and with Marlowe divesting himself from the team, the No. 26 ceased full-time operations.

Final Race (2016)

The No. 26 car returned for the 2016 Daytona 500 with Robert Richardson Jr. driving, with sponsorship from StalkIt. After DiBenedetto raced the No. 93 in through the Can-Am Duels, Richardson was able to qualify on speed, starting 40th in the race. However, he suffered an engine failure and finished 38th.

==== Car No. 26 results ====
Year	Driver	No.	Make	1	2	3	4	5	6	7	8	9	10	11	12	13	14	15	16	17	18	19	20	21	22	23	24	25	26	27	28	29	30	31	32	33	34	35	36	Owners	Pts
2014	Cole Whitt*	26	Toyota	DAY; 28	PHO; 27	LVS; 36	BRI; 40	CAL; 18	MAR; 29	TEX; 31	DAR; 38	RCH; 41	TAL; 21	KAN; 28	CLT; 27	DOV; 27	POC; 30	MCH; 28	SON; 27	KEN; 28	DAY; 34	NHA; 28	IND; 32	POC; 21	GLN; 43	MCH; 25	BRI; 30	ATL; 30	RCH; 30	CHI; 30	NHA; 38	DOV; 30	KAN; 23	CLT; 28	TAL; 15	MAR; 18	TEX; 26	PHO; 42	HOM; 26	31st	502
2015	Jeb Burton	26	Toyota	DAY; DNQ	ATL; 35	LVS; 40	PHO; 34	CAL; 39	MAR; 29	TEX; DNQ	BRI; 42	RCH; DNQ	TAL; DNQ	KAN; 42	CLT; DNQ	DOV; 30	POC; 33	MCH; 37	SON; 32	DAY; 36	KEN; 41	NHA; 41	IND; DNQ	POC; 35	GLN; 39	MCH; 33	BRI; DNQ													43rd	252
2015	J. J. Yeley	26	Toyota																									DAR; 34	RCH; 34	CHI; 35		DOV; 35	CLT; 33	KAN; 42	TAL; 38	MAR; 29	TEX; 33	PHO; 29	HOM; 34	43rd	252
2015	Josh Wise	26	Toyota																												NHA; 31									43rd	252
2016	Robert Richardson Jr.	26	Toyota	DAY; 38	ATL	LVS	PHO	CAL	MAR	TEX	BRI	RCH	TAL	KAN	DOV	CLT	POC	MCH	SON	DAY	KEN	NHA	IND	POC	GLN	BRI	MCH	DAR	RCH	CHI	NHA	DOV	CLT	KAN	TAL	MAR	TEX	PHO	HOM	46th	3

- Cole Whitt's first 8 entries were fielded by Swan Racing before they suspended operations.

=== Car No. 73 history ===
In 2012, BK Racing fielded the third car, a part-time entry numbered 73. At the 2012 Bojangles' Southern 500, David Reutimann drove the No. 93 car with his regular ride at Tommy Baldwin Racing being occupied by Danica Patrick. The team fielded the additional No. 73 car for full-time driver Travis Kvapil, qualifying 33rd and finishing 32nd. On May 21, 2012, BK Racing announced that they would run Reutimann in the No. 73 in the eight remaining races he was not scheduled to drive the No. 10 for TBR, beginning at the Coca-Cola 600 at Charlotte. The No. 73, however, failed to make the 600. Reutimann later decided to take further weekends off that he was not driving for Tommy Baldwin, and the No. 73 was not run for the rest of the year.

==== Car No. 73 results ====
Year	Driver	No.	Make	1	2	3	4	5	6	7	8	9	10	11	12	13	14	15	16	17	18	19	20	21	22	23	24	25	26	27	28	29	30	31	32	33	34	35	36	Owners	Pts
2012	Travis Kvapil	73	Toyota	DAY	PHO	LVS	BRI	CAL	MAR	TEX	KAN	RCH	TAL	DAR; 32																										58th	0
2012	David Reutimann	73	Toyota												CLT; DNQ	DOV	POC	MCH	SON	KEN	DAY	NHA	IND	POC	GLN	MCH	BRI	ATL	RCH	CHI	NHA	DOV	TAL	CLT	KAN	MAR	TEX	PHO	HOM	58th	0

=== Car No. 83 history ===
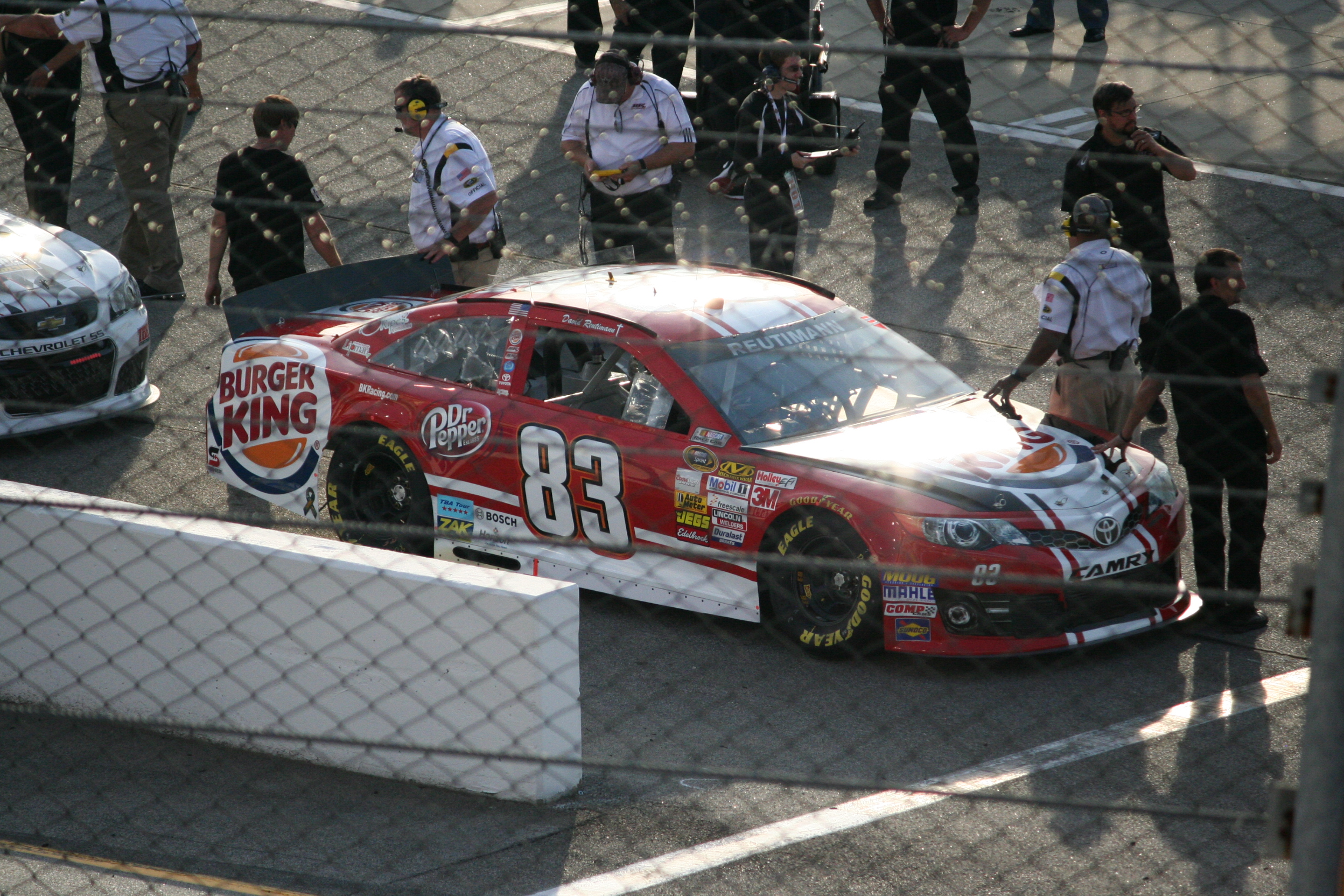
The No. 83 driven by David Reutimann at Richmond in 2013

Landon Cassill (2012)

After spending the majority of the 2011 season driving Phoenix Racing's 09/51 car, former JR Motorsports driver and Hendrick test driver Landon Cassill was signed to drive the 83 car for the balance of the 2012 season. Cassill drove all 36 races in the number 83, finishing 31st in driver standings while the team finished 32nd in the owners points. Cassill had 14 finishes of 25th or better, including a best finish of 18th three times. One of these 18th-place finishes came at Kansas in October, when Cassill was involved in several incidents with then-part-time Cup driver Danica Patrick, eventually leading Patrick to attempt to wreck Cassill, though she ended up collecting severe damage herself.

Cassill departed the team in January 2013 after a new deal could not be achieved for the upcoming season. Cassill later sued the team and principal owner Ron Devine for unpaid winnings and salary in excess of $205,000, in addition to Cassill's claim that he was misinformed about his employment status with the team until January 16 of that year. Meanwhile, owner Devine stated that Cassill's demands to be the team's number-one driver led contract negotiations to go sour, while claiming teammates Travis Kvapil and David Reutimann were content with sharing two rides among three drivers. Cassill ultimately signed with Hillman-Circle Sport LLC to be their primary driver.

David Reutimann (2013)

For 2013, David Reutimann, who had driven the number 73 for BK Racing in select races during the 2012 season (when Danica Patrick was driving the 10), replaced Cassill in the red No. 83 for the 2013 season with Pat Tryson as the team's crew chief. The 83 dropped to 36th in the owner points, while Reutimann finished 33rd in driver points, the lowest ranked driver to run all 36 races. Reutimann and the team mutually parted ways after the season.

Ryan Truex (2014)

2013 Nationwide ROTY runner-up Alex Bowman tested the No. 83 at Daytona testing in January 2014. Bowman moved over to the new 23 team, while former MWR and JGR development driver Ryan Truex was signed to drive the 83 during the 2014 season and run for Rookie of the Year. In January, California-based Borla Exhaust was signed to a five race sponsorship, sporting a unique black paint scheme with flame-emitting exhaust pipes adorning the sides of the car. The flames were retained even in races where usual sponsor Burger King was on the car. VooDoo BBQ & Grill returned to the team for the spring races at Richmond and Talladega. Truex's rookie season was a struggle, as he missed three races including the Daytona 500 and was marred by crashes and mechanical failures that led to 8 DNFs. When running, the 83 was often the slowest of the three BK cars, with an average finish of 36.3. The high point of his season was at Richmond, where qualifying was cancelled and Truex started 8th based on practice speeds, though he would finish 31st. Truex was taken to the hospital after a hard practice crash at Michigan in August. J. J. Yeley replaced Truex in the race, finishing 30th. At New Hampshire in September, Truex was entered in the race, but was pulled from the car on the Friday prior to the race, with the team not citing a reason for the driver change. Former BK driver Travis Kvapil, scheduled to drive the No. 93, was moved into the 83 for the race. Prior to the Dover race the following weekend, several reports surfaced that Truex had been dismissed from the ride after his name was once again left off the entry list, and Truex ultimately parted ways with the team. Chatter from within the team stated that Truex was giving unsatisfactory feedback to the team, while Nick DeGroot of Motorsport.com tweeted that the team owed Truex "a good amount of money".

Owner Ron Devine stated that Truex's release was an attempt "to put a little more seniority in the car", with Kvapil running the 83 again at Dover. Yeley stepped back in starting at Kansas, running the rest of the season in the 83. In October, DipYourCar.com, a retailer of Plasti Dip automotive finish products, signed to sponsor both the 23 and 83 cars at Martinsville and Homestead. The two cars would promote the Dumb and Dumber To film at Phoenix in November; Yeley's 83 car featured the face of Jeff Daniels' Harry Dunne character, and Yeley sported a firesuit mocked up as a powder-blue dress suit. The 83 would end the season 41st in owner points, lowest among cars that attempted every race in 2014. Truex's partial season resulted in a driver rank of 39th.

Matt DiBenedetto (2015-2016)

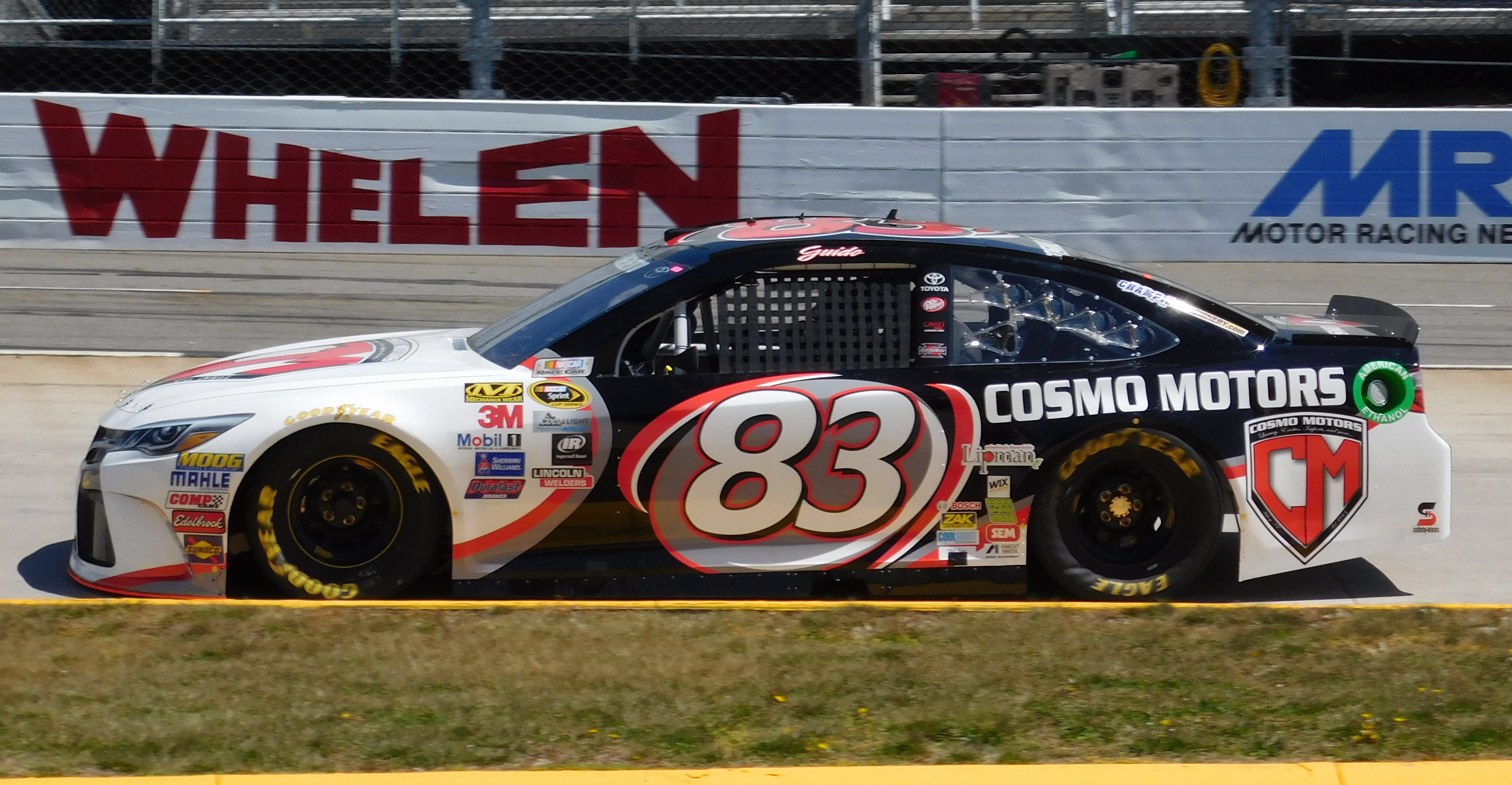
Matt DiBenedetto in the No. 83 at Martinsville in 2016.

In February 2015, the team announced that Camping World Truck Series driver Johnny Sauter would attempt the Daytona 500 in the car, with Doug Richert as crew chief. It was later revealed that Sauter would run a select number of races that don't interfere with his truck schedule. Former Joe Gibbs Racing development driver Matt DiBenedetto signed to drive the car beginning at Atlanta. Dustless Blasting, which sponsored the 23 car in two races in 2014, would return for all four restrictor plate races including the Daytona 500, as well as the spring Bristol and Charlotte races. DiBenedetto missed his first two attempts at Atlanta and Las Vegas, making his series debut at Phoenix finishing 35th. DiBenedetto ran solid at Bristol in April, qualifying 22nd and finishing 21st. Ultimately, Sauter did not return to the team; DiBenedetto would later apply for Rookie of the Year contention, and ran in the car every week from Atlanta to Homestead. In 33 starts, he had an average finish of 32nd, finishing 35th in driver points and second to Brett Moffitt for Rookie of the Year. The No. 83 rebounded to 37th in the owner points.

DiBenedetto returned to BK Racing full-time in 2016 with sponsors Dustless Blasting and Cosmo Motors returning. For the Daytona 500, Michael Waltrip drove the car with sponsorship from Maxwell House. DiBenedetto scored the team's best finish to date at Bristol in April, finishing sixth; the finish was BK's first top ten since Kvapil's eighth-place run in the 2012 Good Sam Roadside Assistance 500 at Talladega. For the following race at Richmond, DiBenedetto acquired sponsorship from E. J. Wade Construction. Dylan Lupton drove the No. 83 at the Richmond fall race, while Jeffrey Earnhardt drove at the Talladega fall race with sponsorship from Starter. Earnhardt drove the car against Texas in place of DiBenedetto, who suffered a concussion in the previous day's Xfinity Series race. DiBenedetto parted ways with BK Racing after the 2016 season.

Corey LaJoie (2017)

Corey LaJoie joined the team in late January to run a part-time schedule. Gray Gaulding will drive the car in at least two races, when Joey Gase occupies his usual ride in the No. 23. Ryan Sieg joined the team at Dover to attempt his Cup Series debut. He finished 26th. The No. 83 team skipped Sonoma and planned to return at Daytona. Sieg made another start with them in the 83 and for the next three races (four until they withdrew at Indy). Stephen Leicht drove the car at the second Pocono race. Brett Moffitt ran 7 races with the team. Joey Gase drove the car at the final race in Miami.

==== Car No. 83 results ====
Year	Driver	No.	Make	1	2	3	4	5	6	7	8	9	10	11	12	13	14	15	16	17	18	19	20	21	22	23	24	25	26	27	28	29	30	31	32	33	34	35	36	Owners	Pts
2012	Landon Cassill	83	Toyota	DAY; 22	PHO; 35	LVS; 36	BRI; 29	CAL; 36	MAR; 29	TEX; 30	KAN; 34	RCH; 20	TAL; 34	DAR; 26	CLT; 18	DOV; 38	POC; 43	MCH; 18	SON; 31	KEN; 25	DAY; 32	NHA; 29	IND; 25	POC; 26	GLN; 23	MCH; 25	BRI; 24	ATL; 20	RCH; 19	CHI; 29	NHA; 27	DOV; 36	TAL; 30	CLT; 26	KAN; 18	MAR; 19	TEX; 26	PHO; 25	HOM; 27	32nd	598
2013	David Reutimann	83	Toyota	DAY; 16	PHO; 25	LVS; 34	BRI; 39	CAL; 33	MAR; 38	TEX; 24	KAN; 28	RCH; 22	TAL; 41	DAR; 36	CLT; 21	DOV; 26	POC; 32	MCH; 32	SON; 26	KEN; 27	DAY; 30	NHA; 28	IND; 29	POC; 31	GLN; 43	MCH; 37	BRI; 29	ATL; 32	RCH; 32	CHI; 36	NHA; 26	DOV; 28	KAN; 37	CLT; 26	TAL; 40	MAR; 37	TEX; 28	PHO; 39	HOM; 31	36th	465
2014	Ryan Truex	83	Toyota	DAY; DNQ	PHO; 35	LVS; 35	BRI; 42	CAL; 31	MAR; 30	TEX; DNQ	DAR; 40	RCH; 31	TAL; 31	KAN; 43	CLT; 38	DOV; 32	POC; 32	MCH; DNQ	SON; 41	KEN; 33	DAY; 32	NHA; 36	IND; 41	POC; 20	GLN; 39	MCH; INQ^{†}	BRI; 37	ATL; 36	RCH; 42	CHI; 42										41st	287
2014	J. J. Yeley	83	Toyota																							MCH; 30							KAN; 29	CLT; 38	TAL; 42	MAR; 39	TEX; 31	PHO; 30	HOM; 37	41st	287
2014	Travis Kvapil	83	Toyota																												NHA; 32	DOV; 38								41st	287
2015	Johnny Sauter	83	Toyota	DAY; 19																																				37th	434
2015	Matt DiBenedetto	83	Toyota		ATL; DNQ	LVS; DNQ	PHO; 35	CAL; 42	MAR; 31	TEX; 34	BRI; 21	RCH; 37	TAL; 18	KAN; 25	CLT; 34	DOV; 32	POC; 32	MCH; 39	SON; 29	DAY; 26	KEN; 42	NHA; 35	IND; 32	POC; 29	GLN; 26	MCH; 30	BRI; 33	DAR; 25	RCH; 36	CHI; 39	NHA; 30	DOV; 34	CLT; 29	KAN; 30	TAL; 40	MAR; 30	TEX; 35	PHO; 28	HOM; 37	37th	434
2016	Michael Waltrip	83	Toyota	DAY; 30																																				35th	406
2016	Matt DiBenedetto	83	Toyota		ATL; 29	LVS; 31	PHO; 20	CAL; 27	MAR; 29	TEX; 34	BRI; 6	RCH; 30	TAL; 36	KAN; 30	DOV; 40	CLT; 32	POC; 40	MCH; 34	SON; 31	DAY; 33	KEN; 38	NHA; 31	IND; 40	POC; 28	GLN; 34	BRI; 17	MCH; 32	DAR; 26		CHI; 30	NHA; 28	DOV; 27	CLT; 25	KAN; 24			TEX; INQ^{‡}	PHO; 25		35th	406
2016	Dylan Lupton	83	Toyota																										RCH; 25							MAR; 31				35th	406
2016	Jeffrey Earnhardt	83	Toyota																																TAL; 34		TEX; 34		HOM; 31	35th	406
2017	Corey LaJoie	83	Toyota	DAY; 24	ATL; 34	LVS; 39	PHO; 38	CAL; 30	MAR; 28	TEX; 32	BRI; 24	RCH; 32	TAL; 27	KAN; 27	CLT; 32		POC; 28	MCH; 30	SON								BRI; 28		RCH; 29											36th	211
2017	Ryan Sieg	83	Toyota													DOV; 26				DAY; 40	KEN; 27	NHA; 32	IND																	36th	211
2017	Stephen Leicht	83	Toyota																					POC; 32																36th	211
2017	Brett Moffitt	83	Toyota																						GLN; 32	MCH; 32				CHI; 37	NHA; 32	DOV; 33	CLT; 39		KAN; 31					36th	211
2017	Gray Gaulding	83	Toyota																									DAR; 36						TAL; 9		MAR; 31	TEX; 40	PHO		36th	211
2017	Joey Gase	83	Toyota																																				HOM; 39	36th	211
^{†} - Qualified but replaced by J. J. Yeley. ^{‡} - Qualified but replaced by Jeffrey Earnhardt

=== Car No. 93 history ===
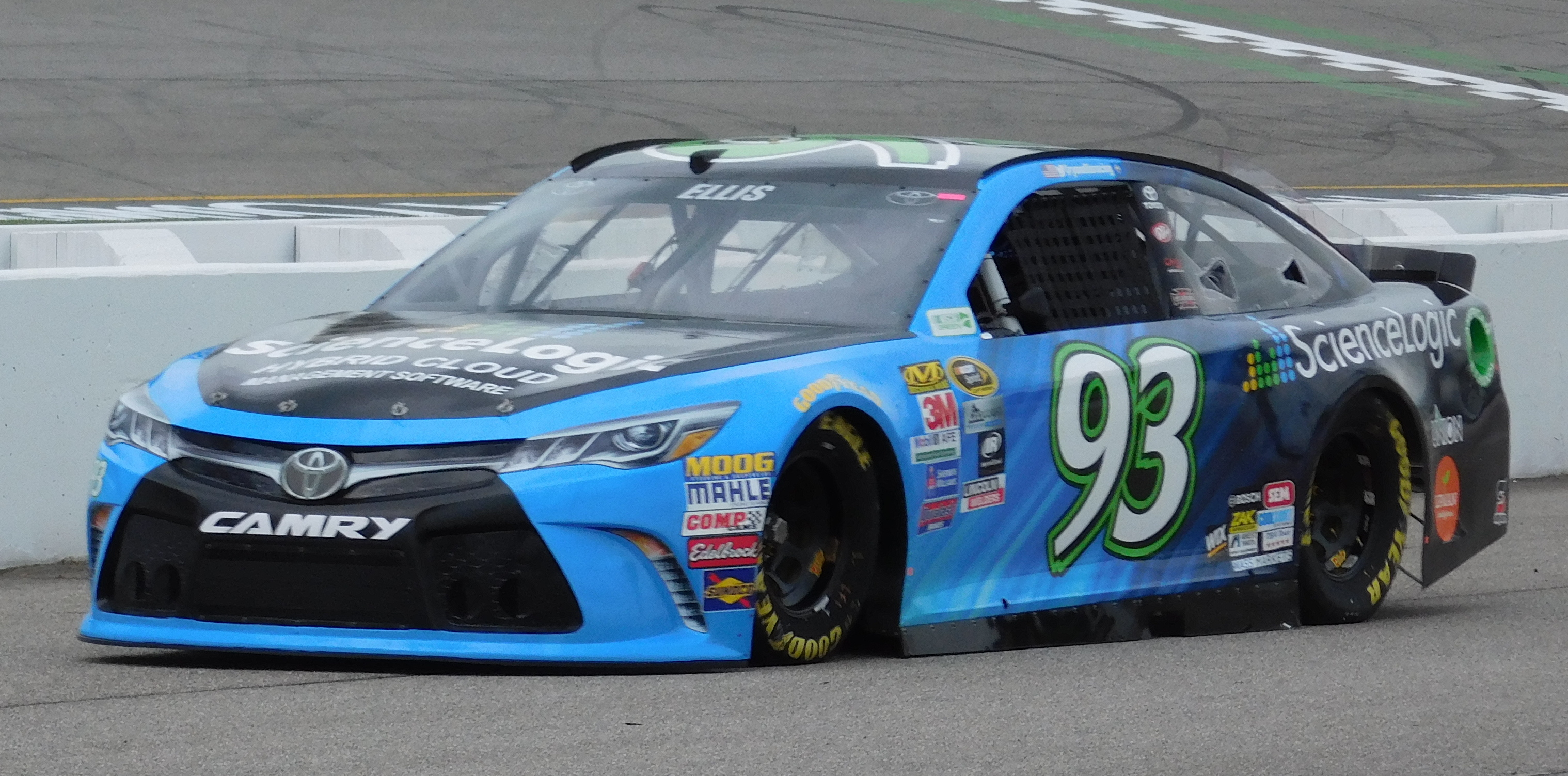
Ryan Ellis in the No. 93 at Richmond in 2016

David Reutimann driving the No. 93 car in the 2012 Daytona 500. Travis Kvapil took over the No. 93 after Daytona and the remainder of the 2012 season, with the exception of one race at Darlington where Reutimann returned to the 93, while Kvapil raced a third No. 73 entry. The 93 finished 28th in owner standings, and Kvapil finished 27th in the drivers standings. Kvapil returned to the 93 for the full 2013 season in a new blue scheme (the 83 ran a red car, the two primary colors of the Burger King logo), with Todd Anderson returning as crew chief. Prior to the second Charlotte race in October, Kvapil was arrested for a domestic dispute with his wife. Kvapil was ultimately allowed to drive at Charlotte. Overall, Kvapil fell back to 31st in points, while the 93 slipped to 34th in owner points.

The team announced that the No. 93 team would return on a part-time basis in 2014. The car was driven by Morgan Shepherd for the 2014 Daytona 500 in collaboration with Pat MacDonald, with sponsorship from the Support Military Foundation. However, Shepherd failed to qualify. Though the team had already expanded to three full-time cars with the addition of the No. 26, the No. 93 returned later in the year as a fourth BK car. Veteran Mike Bliss drove at both Kentucky and Loudon with Dr Pepper on the car. Johnny Sauter then drove the car with Dr Pepper at Pocono in August, and J. J. Yeley drove a Burger King-branded No. 93 at Richmond in September. At Loudon in September, Travis Kvapil was scheduled to return to BK's No. 93, but moved over to the No. 83 and was replaced with Clay Rogers, with Iowa City Capital Partners appearing on the car. Rogers returned to the car again at Martinsville, this time with Burger King decals. Except for the Daytona 500, the part-time car was a start and park ride used to fill the sponsorship gaps on the other three cars. Since the team failed to qualify in its first attempt and its next three appearances were late-entries, the team had no owner points prior to Richmond in September.

For 2015, it was planned that Sprint Cup Series rookie Matt DiBenedetto would race the 93 car part-time, driving the 93 in races that Camping World Truck Series driver Johnny Sauter drove in the 83. However, after Sauter only ran the Daytona 500, DiBenedetto took over the 83 full-time; the 93 did not run in 2015. For the 2016 Daytona 500, DiBenedetto drove the car due to Michael Waltrip driving the 83, with sponsorship from Dustless Blasting. The team also utilized an engine from Toyota Racing Development. DiBenedetto qualified for the race on speed, but crashed with Chris Buescher just before the halfway point of the race, finishing last. Starting at Richmond in April, the 93 car would return for multiple races with Ryan Ellis driving and sponsorship from Science Logic. Dylan Lupton joined the team in the 93 at Sonoma. DiBenedetto returned to the 93 at the fall Richmond race. At the Ford EcoBoost 400, the car was renumbered to No. 49 to promote NASCAR Heat Evolution's $49.99 price.

==== Car No. 93 results ====
Year	Driver	No.	Make	1	2	3	4	5	6	7	8	9	10	11	12	13	14	15	16	17	18	19	20	21	22	23	24	25	26	27	28	29	30	31	32	33	34	35	36	Owners	Pts
2012	David Reutimann	93	Toyota	DAY; 26										DAR; 36																										28th	644
2012	Travis Kvapil	93	Toyota		PHO; 19	LVS; 39	BRI; 27	CAL; 29	MAR; 27	TEX; 38	KAN; 25	RCH; 30	TAL; 16		CLT; 29	DOV; 23	POC; 26	MCH; 26	SON; 36	KEN; 17	DAY; 16	NHA; 30	IND; 37	POC; 25	GLN; 24	MCH; 15	BRI; 18	ATL; 26	RCH; 27	CHI; 31	NHA; 31	DOV; 29	TAL; 8	CLT; 25	KAN; 17	MAR; 31	TEX; 23	PHO; 20	HOM; 26	28th	644
2013	Travis Kvapil	93	Toyota	DAY; 25	PHO; 29	LVS; 39	BRI; 38	CAL; 34	MAR; 39	TEX; 22	KAN; 36	RCH; 37	TAL; 38	DAR; 23	CLT; 40	DOV; 39	POC; 20	MCH; 27	SON; 17	KEN; 42	DAY; 18	NHA; 38	IND; 31	POC; 26	GLN; 40	MCH; 28	BRI; 16	ATL; 27	RCH; 28	CHI; 24	NHA; 28	DOV; 31	KAN; 26	CLT; 35	TAL; 19	MAR; 24	TEX; 32	PHO; 41	HOM; 37	34th	496
2014	Morgan Shepherd	93	Toyota	DAY; DNQ	PHO	LVS	BRI	CAL	MAR	TEX	DAR	RCH	TAL	KAN	CLT	DOV	POC	MCH	SON																					51st	3
2014	Mike Bliss	93	Toyota																	KEN; 41^{1}	DAY	NHA; 43^{1}	IND																	51st	3
2014	Johnny Sauter	93	Toyota																					POC; 43^{1}	GLN	MCH	BRI	ATL												51st	3
2014	J. J. Yeley	93	Toyota																										RCH; 43	CHI										51st	3
2014	Clay Rogers	93	Toyota																												NHA; 43	DOV	KAN	CLT	TAL	MAR; 43	TEX	PHO	HOM	51st	3
2016	Matt DiBenedetto	93	Toyota	DAY; 40	ATL	LVS	PHO	CAL	MAR	TEX	BRI																		RCH; 37	CHI	NHA	DOV	CLT	KAN	TAL; 27	MAR; 32				41st	55
2016	Ryan Ellis	93	Toyota									RCH; 37	TAL	KAN	DOV	CLT	POC	MCH					IND; 32	POC	GLN	BRI	MCH	DAR									TEX; 38	PHO		41st	55
2016	Dylan Lupton	93	Toyota																SON; 35	DAY	KEN	NHA																		41st	55
2016	Matt DiBenedetto	49	Toyota																																				HOM; 27	41st	55
^{1} Post-Entry. Driver and Owner scored no points
