= 2016 Teenage Mutant Ninja Turtles 400 =

NASCAR Sprint Cup series in Illinois, U.S.

Race details
- Race 27 of 36 in the 2016 NASCAR Sprint Cup Series
- Date: September 18, 2016
- Location: Chicagoland Speedway in Joliet, Illinois
- Course: Permanent racing facility
- Course length: 1.5 miles (2.414 km)
- Distance: 270 laps, 405 mi (651.784 km)
- Scheduled distance: 267 laps, 400.5 mi (644.542 km)
- Average speed: 145.161 mph (233.614 km/h)

Pole position
Driver	Kyle Busch	Joe Gibbs Racing

Most laps led
Driver	Jimmie Johnson	Hendrick Motorsports
- Laps: 118

Winner
No. 78	Martin Truex Jr.	Furniture Row Racing

Television in the United States
- Network: NBCSN
- Announcers: Rick Allen, Jeff Burton and Steve Letarte
- Nielsen ratings: 1.5/3 (Overnight); 1.6/3 (Final); 2.7 million viewers

Radio in the United States
- Radio: MRN
- Booth announcers: Joe Moore, Jeff Striegle and Rusty Wallace
- Turn announcers: Dave Moody (1 & 2) and Mike Bagley (3 & 4)

The 2016 Teenage Mutant Ninja Turtles 400 was a NASCAR Sprint Cup Series stock car race held on September 18, 2016, at Chicagoland Speedway in Joliet, Illinois. Contested over 270 laps on the 1.5-mile (2.4-kilometre) intermediate speedway, it was the 27th race of the 2016 NASCAR Sprint Cup Series season, first race of the Chase and first race of the Round of 16.

Furniture Row Racing's Martin Truex Jr. won his third race of the 2016 season ahead of Team Penske's Joey Logano, winning for the first time at Chicagoland, to advance to the second round of the Chase. The race had 17 lead changes among 9 different drivers and 4 cautions for 22 laps.

== Report ==
=== Background ===
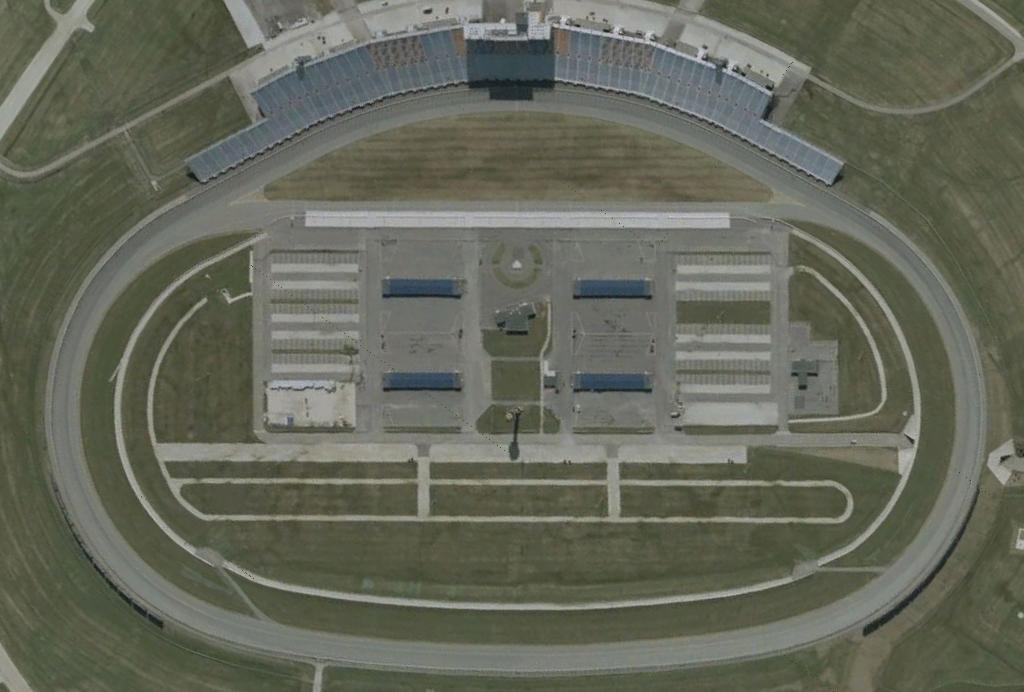
Chicagoland Speedway, the track where the race was held.

Chicagoland Speedway is a 1.5-mile (2.4-kilometre) tri-oval speedway in Joliet, Illinois, southwest of Chicago.

=== Entry list ===
The preliminary entry list for the race included 40 cars and was released on September 12, 2016, at 11:36 a.m. Eastern time.

No.	Driver	Team	Manufacturer
1	Jamie McMurray	Chip Ganassi Racing	Chevrolet
2	Brad Keselowski	Team Penske	Ford
3	Austin Dillon	Richard Childress Racing	Chevrolet
4	Kevin Harvick	Stewart–Haas Racing	Chevrolet
5	Kasey Kahne	Hendrick Motorsports	Chevrolet
6	Trevor Bayne	Roush Fenway Racing	Ford
7	Regan Smith	Tommy Baldwin Racing	Chevrolet
10	Danica Patrick	Stewart–Haas Racing	Chevrolet
11	Denny Hamlin	Joe Gibbs Racing	Toyota
13	Casey Mears	Germain Racing	Chevrolet
14	Tony Stewart	Stewart–Haas Racing	Chevrolet
15	Clint Bowyer	HScott Motorsports	Chevrolet
16	Greg Biffle	Roush Fenway Racing	Ford
17	Ricky Stenhouse Jr.	Roush Fenway Racing	Ford
18	Kyle Busch	Joe Gibbs Racing	Toyota
19	Carl Edwards	Joe Gibbs Racing	Toyota
20	Matt Kenseth	Joe Gibbs Racing	Toyota
21	Ryan Blaney (R)	Wood Brothers Racing	Ford
22	Joey Logano	Team Penske	Ford
23	David Ragan	BK Racing	Toyota
24	Chase Elliott (R)	Hendrick Motorsports	Chevrolet
27	Paul Menard	Richard Childress Racing	Chevrolet
30	Josh Wise	The Motorsports Group	Chevrolet
31	Ryan Newman	Richard Childress Racing	Chevrolet
32	Joey Gase (i)	Go FAS Racing	Ford
34	Chris Buescher (R)	Front Row Motorsports	Ford
38	Landon Cassill	Front Row Motorsports	Ford
41	Kurt Busch	Stewart–Haas Racing	Chevrolet
42	Kyle Larson	Chip Ganassi Racing	Chevrolet
43	Aric Almirola	Richard Petty Motorsports	Ford
44	Brian Scott (R)	Richard Petty Motorsports	Ford
46	Michael Annett	HScott Motorsports	Chevrolet
47	A. J. Allmendinger	JTG Daugherty Racing	Chevrolet
48	Jimmie Johnson	Hendrick Motorsports	Chevrolet
55	Reed Sorenson	Premium Motorsports	Chevrolet
78	Martin Truex Jr.	Furniture Row Racing	Toyota
83	Matt DiBenedetto	BK Racing	Toyota
88	Alex Bowman (i)	Hendrick Motorsports	Chevrolet
95	Michael McDowell	Circle Sport – Leavine Family Racing	Chevrolet
98	Cole Whitt	Premium Motorsports	Chevrolet
Official entry list

== Qualifying ==
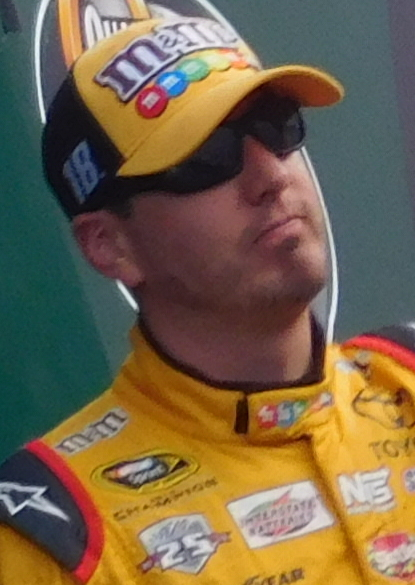
Kyle Busch won the pole.

Qualifying for Friday was cancelled due to rain. Kyle Busch was awarded the pole position as a result.

=== Starting lineup ===
Pos	No.	Driver	Team	Manufacturer
1	18	Kyle Busch	Joe Gibbs Racing	Toyota
2	2	Brad Keselowski	Team Penske	Ford
3	11	Denny Hamlin	Joe Gibbs Racing	Toyota
4	4	Kevin Harvick	Stewart–Haas Racing	Chevrolet
5	19	Carl Edwards	Joe Gibbs Racing	Toyota
6	78	Martin Truex Jr.	Furniture Row Racing	Toyota
7	20	Matt Kenseth	Joe Gibbs Racing	Toyota
8	48	Jimmie Johnson	Hendrick Motorsports	Chevrolet
9	22	Joey Logano	Team Penske	Ford
10	42	Kyle Larson	Chip Ganassi Racing	Chevrolet
11	14	Tony Stewart	Stewart–Haas Racing	Chevrolet
12	41	Kurt Busch	Stewart–Haas Racing	Chevrolet
13	34	Chris Buescher (R)	Front Row Motorsports	Ford
14	24	Chase Elliott (R)	Hendrick Motorsports	Chevrolet
15	3	Austin Dillon	Richard Childress Racing	Chevrolet
16	1	Jamie McMurray	Chip Ganassi Racing	Chevrolet
17	88	Alex Bowman (i)	Hendrick Motorsports	Chevrolet
18	31	Ryan Newman	Richard Childress Racing	Chevrolet
19	5	Kasey Kahne	Hendrick Motorsports	Chevrolet
20	6	Trevor Bayne	Roush Fenway Racing	Ford
21	47	A. J. Allmendinger	JTG Daugherty Racing	Chevrolet
22	21	Ryan Blaney (R)	Wood Brothers Racing	Ford
23	17	Ricky Stenhouse Jr.	Roush Fenway Racing	Ford
24	16	Greg Biffle	Roush Fenway Racing	Ford
25	10	Danica Patrick	Stewart–Haas Racing	Chevrolet
26	27	Paul Menard	Richard Childress Racing	Chevrolet
27	43	Aric Almirola	Richard Petty Motorsports	Ford
28	15	Clint Bowyer	HScott Motorsports	Chevrolet
29	13	Casey Mears	Germain Racing	Chevrolet
30	95	Michael McDowell	Circle Sport – Leavine Family Racing	Chevrolet
31	38	Landon Cassill	Front Row Motorsports	Ford
32	23	David Ragan	BK Racing	Toyota
33	7	Regan Smith	Tommy Baldwin Racing	Chevrolet
34	44	Brian Scott (R)	Richard Petty Motorsports	Ford
35	83	Matt DiBenedetto	BK Racing	Toyota
36	98	Cole Whitt	Premium Motorsports	Chevrolet
37	46	Michael Annett	HScott Motorsports	Chevrolet
38	32	Joey Gase (i)	Go FAS Racing	Ford
39	55	Reed Sorenson	Premium Motorsports	Chevrolet
40	30	Josh Wise	The Motorsports Group	Chevrolet
Official starting lineup

== Practice ==
=== First practice ===
Jimmie Johnson was the fastest in the first practice session with a time of 29.383 and a speed of 183.780 mph (295.765 km/h).

Pos	No.	Driver	Team	Manufacturer	Time	Speed
1	48	Jimmie Johnson	Hendrick Motorsports	Chevrolet	29.383	183.780
2	19	Carl Edwards	Joe Gibbs Racing	Toyota	29.460	183.299
3	11	Denny Hamlin	Joe Gibbs Racing	Toyota	29.520	182.927
Official first practice results

=== Second practice ===
Kyle Larson was the fastest in the second practice session with a time of 29.033 and a speed of 185.995 mph (299.330 km/h).

Pos	No.	Driver	Team	Manufacturer	Time	Speed
1	42	Kyle Larson	Chip Ganassi Racing	Chevrolet	29.033	185.995
2	41	Kurt Busch	Stewart–Haas Racing	Chevrolet	29.067	185.778
3	22	Joey Logano	Team Penske	Toyota	29.156	185.211
Official second practice results

=== Final practice ===
Kyle Larson was the fastest in the final practice session with a time of 29.460 and a speed of 183.299 mph (294.991 km/h).

Pos	No.	Driver	Team	Manufacturer	Time	Speed
1	42	Kyle Larson	Chip Ganassi Racing	Chevrolet	29.460	183.299
2	24	Chase Elliott (R)	Hendrick Motorsports	Chevrolet	29.527	182.883
3	18	Kyle Busch	Joe Gibbs Racing	Toyota	29.536	182.828
Official final practice results

== Race ==
=== First half ===
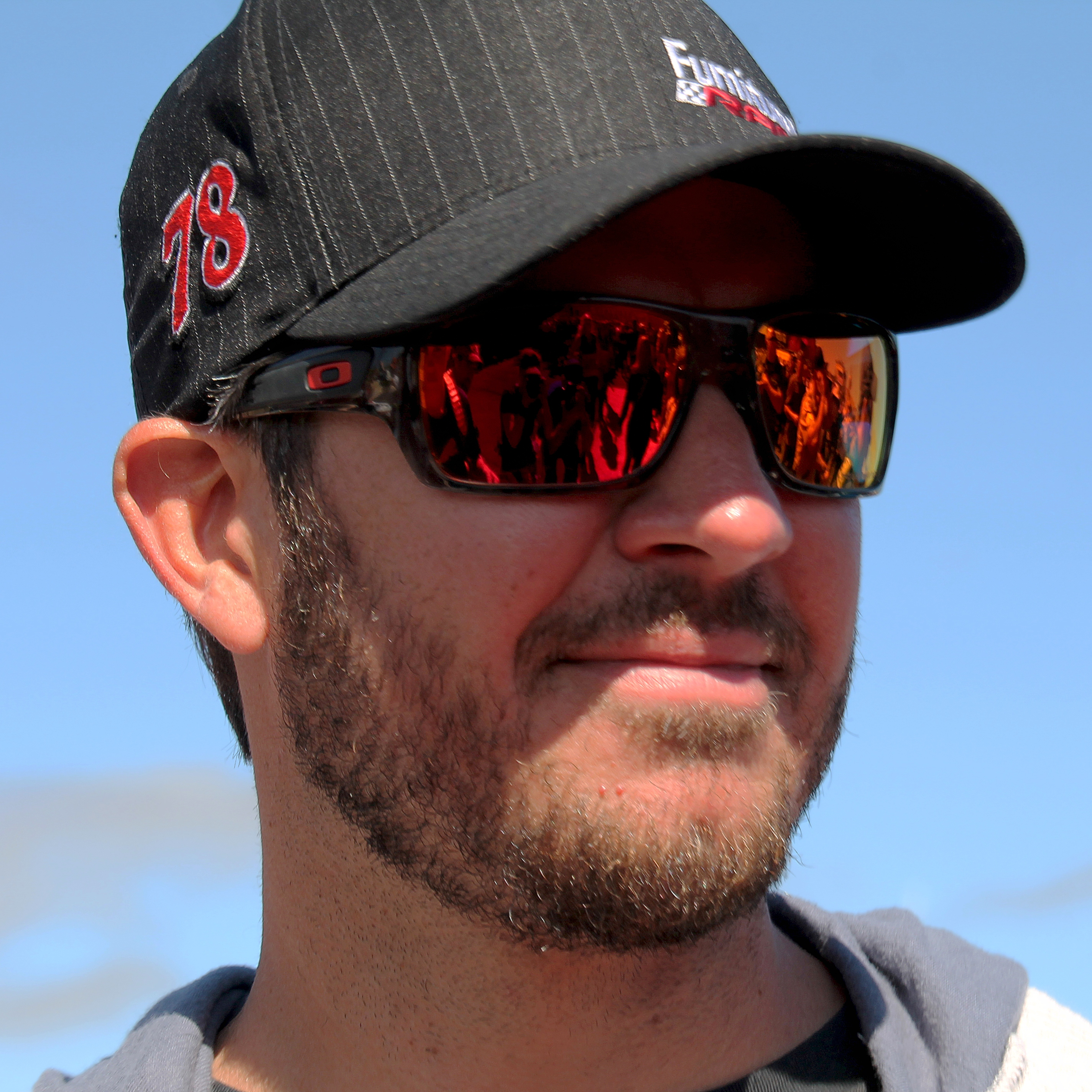
Martin Truex Jr. won the race.

Under clear blue Illinois skies, Kyle Busch led the field to the green flag at 2:49 p.m. He led the first 22 laps before Martin Truex Jr. powered by on the outside exiting turn 2 to take the lead on lap 23. Green flag stops commenced on lap 48, and a tire that came from the stall of Aric Almirola and came to a stop in the frontstretch grass area brought out the first caution of the race on lap 49. Jimmie Johnson, who made it across the start/finish line on pit road before Truex crossed the line on the track, remained on the lead lap and assumed the lead after he opted to stay out when Truex pitted. Kevin Harvick, who worked his way up to eighth after starting the race from the rear end of the field for an unapproved adjustment, didn't beat Truex back to the line and was trapped a lap down for much of the race.

The race restarted on lap 56. Truex, who was running second, made an unscheduled stop on lap 70 for a flat right-rear tire. He rejoined the race in 21st one lap down. Green flag stops started again on lap 103. Johnson hit pit road the next lap and handed the lead to Brad Keselowski. He pitted the next lap and the lead cycled back to Johnson. Casey Mears was issued a pass through penalty for speeding on pit road and then was issued a stop and go penalty for speeding on his pass through.

The second caution of the race flew on lap 119 for Brian Scott getting loose and spinning out in turn 4. Matt Kenseth was sent to the tail end of the field on the ensuing restart for speeding on pit road.

=== Second half ===
The race restarted on lap 126. This run was much like the second run in which the field settled into a rhythm of green flag racing. During this run, Harvick came up and hit the 78 car. Truex said after the race in his media availability that "nothing led up to it. We hadn't been around each other all day, really. I passed him once earlier. I had fresh tires, he was lapped and that was after I had my flat (so) I was racing to get my lap back." The next round of green flag stops began on lap 172. Johnson pitted from the lead the same lap and handed the lead to Keselowski. He pitted on lap 174 and the lead cycled back to Johnson. Busch was issued a pass through penalty for speeding on pit road.

Busch worked his back onto the lead lap by driving around race leader Johnson on lap 182. That same lap, teammate Chase Elliott passed him for the lead exiting turn 4. Debris on the backstretch brought out the third caution of the race on lap 193.

The race restarted on lap 199. Not much happened until the final round of green flag pit stops with 33 laps to go. Elliott pitted with 32 to go and handed the lead to Denny Hamlin. He pitted with 30 to go and handed the lead to Ryan Blaney. He pitted with 25 to go and handed the lead to Alex Bowman. He pitted with 19 to go and the lead cycled back to Elliott. During the pit cycle, Johnson was issued a pass through penalty for speeding. He said after the race that he "just can’t believe I got in trouble down there leaving the pits. I feel terrible for these guys. It should have been a top-five day, but I will back down on pit road even more and try not to make that mistake. Hats off to the team for our fast Lowe’s Chevrolet, I just screwed up.”

Truex was gaining ground on Elliott in the closing laps of the race, but not enough to catch him with the laps remaining. Unfortunately for Elliott, a shredded right-front tire from the No. 95 car of Michael McDowell brought out the fourth caution of the race with five laps to go and forced overtime. Three drivers: Blaney, who assumed the lead, Kasey Kahne and Carl Edwards, opted to stay out while the rest of the lead lap cars pitted. Truex exited pit road ahead of Elliott.

=== Overtime ===
The race restarted with two laps to go. Blaney was no match on old tires against Truex on new tires. Truex passed him on the backstretch with two to go and drove on to score the victory.

== Post-race ==
=== Driver comments ===
Following his victory, Truex acknowledged the difficulties encountered during the race and praised his team, including crew chief Cole Pearn, team engineer Jeff Curtis, the pit crew and team owner Barney Visser, for their contributions to the result.[1] He also noted that an early setback had given the team sufficient time to recover and remain competitive throughout the race.[2]

Truex's car failed post-race LIS (Laser Inspection Station) after the race. The failure was not considered "encumbered" and he was allowed to keep the benefits of his win.

Joey Logano, who finished runner-up, said his day saw "awesome execution by the 22 team. From every angle. We had a very fast race car and were awesome on pit road. You want to talk about pressure, not just Chase pressure, but coming down at the end of the race to try to win, they executed and had an awesome pit stop and beat the 11 out and ultimately gives us a second place finish. I couldn’t be more proud of the team and the way we executed and attacked today. We will take this momentum and run with it the next nine weeks.”

Elliott, who was leading the race with five to go and finished third, said he "felt like we did a good job as a team today trying to control the things that we could control. And you can't control when a caution is going to come out. Granted, you can expect one a lot of the time, but you can't control when it's going to happen, and you certainly can't control how many guys are going to stay out on tires and try to make something happen at the end of a race. That's just a part of life, part of racing." He added that he was "proud of that (speed his car showed); we are proud of the run we had today,” he said. “Obviously, hate to come up short, but that is part of life some days. We were fast and I think that is something to be happy about and we can move forward to Loudon (next week) with some motivation.”

“You know, it was a long day for us for sure,” said Blaney. “We passed a lot of cars. We didn’t start good. We started 22nd. Worked on our car all day and got it better and better each run. There was maybe only one run where I thought we went backwards. We fixed it right away and started going back forward again. That was promising. I think we were seventh before that last caution. Decided to stay out. “We initially decided if we could get to the front two rows, we were going to stay out. Then you kind of had a shot. But then everyone came. We decided to stay out anyway. That put us in the best position possible being able to restart the race. Knew it was going to be tough when only a couple cars stayed out with us. We needed about two or three more for it to be a realistic shot.”

== Race results ==
Pos	No.	Driver	Team	Manufacturer	Laps	Points
1	78	Martin Truex Jr.	Furniture Row Racing	Toyota	270	44
2	22	Joey Logano	Team Penske	Ford	270	40
3	24	Chase Elliott (R)	Hendrick Motorsports	Chevrolet	270	39
4	21	Ryan Blaney (R)	Wood Brothers Racing	Ford	270	38
5	2	Brad Keselowski	Team Penske	Ford	270	37
6	11	Denny Hamlin	Joe Gibbs Racing	Toyota	270	36
7	5	Kasey Kahne	Hendrick Motorsports	Chevrolet	270	34
8	18	Kyle Busch	Joe Gibbs Racing	Toyota	270	34
9	20	Matt Kenseth	Joe Gibbs Racing	Toyota	270	32
10	88	Alex Bowman (i)	Hendrick Motorsports	Chevrolet	270	0
11	1	Jamie McMurray	Chip Ganassi Racing	Chevrolet	270	30
12	48	Jimmie Johnson	Hendrick Motorsports	Chevrolet	270	31
13	41	Kurt Busch	Stewart–Haas Racing	Chevrolet	270	28
14	3	Austin Dillon	Richard Childress Racing	Chevrolet	270	27
15	19	Carl Edwards	Joe Gibbs Racing	Toyota	270	26
16	14	Tony Stewart	Stewart–Haas Racing	Chevrolet	270	25
17	47	A. J. Allmendinger	JTG Daugherty Racing	Chevrolet	270	24
18	42	Kyle Larson	Chip Ganassi Racing	Chevrolet	269	23
19	31	Ryan Newman	Richard Childress Racing	Chevrolet	269	22
20	4	Kevin Harvick	Stewart–Haas Racing	Chevrolet	269	21
21	27	Paul Menard	Richard Childress Racing	Chevrolet	269	20
22	15	Clint Bowyer	HScott Motorsports	Chevrolet	269	19
23	6	Trevor Bayne	Roush Fenway Racing	Ford	269	18
24	10	Danica Patrick	Stewart–Haas Racing	Chevrolet	269	17
25	17	Ricky Stenhouse Jr.	Roush Fenway Racing	Ford	268	16
26	16	Greg Biffle	Roush Fenway Racing	Ford	268	15
27	7	Ty Dillon (i)	Tommy Baldwin Racing	Chevrolet	268	0
28	34	Chris Buescher (R)	Front Row Motorsports	Ford	268	13
29	38	Landon Cassill	Front Row Motorsports	Ford	267	12
30	83	Matt DiBenedetto	BK Racing	Toyota	267	11
31	44	Brian Scott (R)	Richard Petty Motorsports	Ford	266	10
32	43	Aric Almirola	Richard Petty Motorsports	Ford	266	9
33	46	Michael Annett	HScott Motorsports	Chevrolet	265	8
34	13	Casey Mears	Germain Racing	Chevrolet	265	7
35	23	David Ragan	BK Racing	Toyota	265	6
36	98	Cole Whitt	Premium Motorsports	Chevrolet	263	5
37	95	Michael McDowell	Circle Sport – Leavine Family Racing	Chevrolet	262	4
38	30	Josh Wise	The Motorsports Group	Chevrolet	260	3
39	55	Reed Sorenson	Premium Motorsports	Chevrolet	257	2
40	32	Joey Gase (i)	Go FAS Racing	Ford	254	0
Official race results

=== Race summary ===
- Lead changes: 17 among 9 different drivers
- Cautions/Laps: 4 for 22 laps
- Red flags: 0
- Time of race: 2 hours, 47 minutes and 24 seconds
- Average speed: 145.161 miles per hour (233.614 km/h)

== Media ==
=== Television ===
NBC Sports covered the race on the television side. Rick Allen, Jeff Burton and Steve Letarte had the call in the booth for the race. Dave Burns, Mike Massaro, Marty Snider and Kelli Stavast reported from pit lane during the race.

NBCSN
Booth announcers	Pit reporters
Lap-by-lap: Rick Allen; Color-commentator: Jeff Burton; Color-commentator: Steve Letarte	Dave Burns; Mike Massaro; Marty Snider; Kelli Stavast

=== Radio ===
The Motor Racing Network had the radio call for the race, which was simulcast on Sirius XM NASCAR Radio.

MRN
Booth announcers	Turn announcers	Pit reporters
Lead announcer: Joe Moore; Announcer: Jeff Striegle; Announcer: Rusty Wallace	Turns 1 & 2: Dave Moody; Turns 3 & 4: Mike Bagley	Alex Hayden; Winston Kelley; Steve Post

== Standings after the race ==
Drivers' Championship standings
	Pos	Manufacturer	Points
5	1	Martin Truex Jr.	2,050
	2	Brad Keselowski	2,049 (–1)
2	3	Kyle Busch	2,046 (–4)
1	4	Denny Hamlin	2,045 (–5)
4	5	Joey Logano	2,043 (–7)
8	6	Chase Elliott	2,039 (–11)
	7	Matt Kenseth	2,038 (–12)
	8	Jimmie Johnson	2,037 (–13)
4	9	Carl Edwards	2,032 (–18)
2	10	Kurt Busch	2,031 (–19)
5	11	Jamie McMurray	2,030 (–20)
1	12	Tony Stewart	2,028 (–22)
2	13	Austin Dillon	2,027 (–23)
10	14	Kevin Harvick	2,027 (–23)
5	15	Kyle Larson	2,026 (–24)
3	16	Chris Buescher	2,016 (–34)
Official driver's standings

Manufacturers' Championship standings
Pos	Manufacturer	Points
1	Toyota	1,116
2	Chevrolet	1,084 (–32)
3	Ford	1,034 (–82)
Official manufacturers' standings

- Note: Only the first 16 positions are included for the driver standings.

Previous race: 2016 Federated Auto Parts 400	Sprint Cup Series; 2016 season	Next race: 2016 Bad Boy Off Road 300
