= 2016 Can-Am 500 =

Race details
- Race 35 of 36 in the 2016 NASCAR Sprint Cup Series
- 2016 Can-Am 500 program cover
- Date: November 13, 2016
- Location: Phoenix International Raceway in Avondale, Arizona
- Course: Permanent racing facility
- Course length: 1 miles (1.609 km)
- Distance: 324 laps, 324 mi (521.427 km)
- Scheduled distance: 312 laps, 312 mi (502.115 km)
- Average speed: 102.866 miles per hour (165.547 km/h)

Pole position
Driver	Alex Bowman	Hendrick Motorsports
- Time: 25.619

Most laps led
Driver	Alex Bowman	Hendrick Motorsports
- Laps: 193

Winner
No. 22	Joey Logano	Team Penske

Television in the United States
- Network: NBC
- Announcers: Rick Allen, Jeff Burton and Steve Letarte

Radio in the United States
- Radio: MRN
- Booth announcers: Joe Moore, Jeff Striegle and Rusty Wallace
- Turn announcers: Dan Hubbard (1 & 2) and Kyle Rickey (3 & 4)

The 2016 Can-Am 500 was a NASCAR Sprint Cup Series race held on November 13, 2016, at Phoenix International Raceway in Avondale, Arizona. Contested over 324 laps – extended from 312 laps due to an overtime finish – on the 1-mile (1.6-kilometre) oval, it was the 35th race of the 2016 NASCAR Sprint Cup Series season, ninth race of the Chase and final race of the Round of 8.

Team Penske's Joey Logano won his third race of the season, and advanced to the Championship 4 as a result of the victory.

== Entry list ==
No.	Driver	Team	Manufacturer
1	Jamie McMurray	Chip Ganassi Racing	Chevrolet
2	Brad Keselowski	Team Penske	Ford
3	Austin Dillon	Richard Childress Racing	Chevrolet
4	Kevin Harvick	Stewart–Haas Racing	Chevrolet
5	Kasey Kahne	Hendrick Motorsports	Chevrolet
6	Trevor Bayne	Roush Fenway Racing	Ford
7	Regan Smith	Tommy Baldwin Racing	Chevrolet
10	Danica Patrick	Stewart–Haas Racing	Chevrolet
11	Denny Hamlin	Joe Gibbs Racing	Toyota
13	Casey Mears	Germain Racing	Chevrolet
14	Tony Stewart	Stewart–Haas Racing	Chevrolet
15	Clint Bowyer	HScott Motorsports	Chevrolet
16	Greg Biffle	Roush Fenway Racing	Ford
17	Ricky Stenhouse Jr.	Roush Fenway Racing	Ford
18	Kyle Busch	Joe Gibbs Racing	Toyota
19	Carl Edwards	Joe Gibbs Racing	Toyota
20	Matt Kenseth	Joe Gibbs Racing	Toyota
21	Ryan Blaney (R)	Wood Brothers Racing	Ford
22	Joey Logano	Team Penske	Ford
23	David Ragan	BK Racing	Toyota
24	Chase Elliott (R)	Hendrick Motorsports	Chevrolet
27	Paul Menard	Richard Childress Racing	Chevrolet
30	Gray Gaulding	The Motorsports Group	Chevrolet
31	Ryan Newman	Richard Childress Racing	Chevrolet
32	Jeffrey Earnhardt (R)	Go FAS Racing	Ford
34	Chris Buescher (R)	Front Row Motorsports	Ford
38	Landon Cassill	Front Row Motorsports	Ford
41	Kurt Busch	Stewart–Haas Racing	Chevrolet
42	Kyle Larson	Chip Ganassi Racing	Chevrolet
43	Aric Almirola	Richard Petty Motorsports	Ford
44	Brian Scott (R)	Richard Petty Motorsports	Ford
46	Michael Annett	HScott Motorsports	Chevrolet
47	A. J. Allmendinger	JTG Daugherty Racing	Chevrolet
48	Jimmie Johnson	Hendrick Motorsports	Chevrolet
55	D. J. Kennington (i)	Premium Motorsports	Toyota
78	Martin Truex Jr.	Furniture Row Racing	Toyota
83	Matt DiBenedetto	BK Racing	Toyota
88	Alex Bowman (i)	Hendrick Motorsports	Chevrolet
95	Michael McDowell	Circle Sport – Leavine Family Racing	Chevrolet
98	Reed Sorenson	Premium Motorsports	Toyota
Official entry list

== Practice ==
=== First practice ===
Kyle Larson was the fastest in the first practice session with a time of 25.802 and a speed of 139.524 mph (224.542 km/h). Martin Truex Jr. went to a backup car after wrecking his primary in the closing second of the session.

Pos	No.	Driver	Team	Manufacturer	Time	Speed
1	42	Kyle Larson	Chip Ganassi Racing	Chevrolet	25.802	139.524
2	22	Joey Logano	Team Penske	Ford	25.808	139.492
3	24	Chase Elliott (R)	Hendrick Motorsports	Chevrolet	25.844	139.297
Official first practice results

=== Second practice ===
Martin Truex Jr. was the fastest in the second practice session with a time of 26.573 and a speed of 135.476 mph (218.027 km/h).

Pos	No.	Driver	Team	Manufacturer	Time	Speed
1	78	Martin Truex Jr.	Furniture Row Racing	Toyota	26.573	135.476
2	2	Brad Keselowski	Team Penske	Ford	26.586	135.410
3	1	Jamie McMurray	Chip Ganassi Racing	Chevrolet	26.646	135.105
Official second practice results

=== Final practice ===
Kyle Busch was the fastest in the final practice session with a time of 26.401 and a speed of 136.358 mph (219.447 km/h).

Pos	No.	Driver	Team	Manufacturer	Time	Speed
1	18	Kyle Busch	Joe Gibbs Racing	Toyota	26.401	136.358
2	2	Brad Keselowski	Team Penske	Ford	26.415	136.286
3	22	Joey Logano	Team Penske	Ford	26.431	136.204
Official final practice results

== Qualifying ==
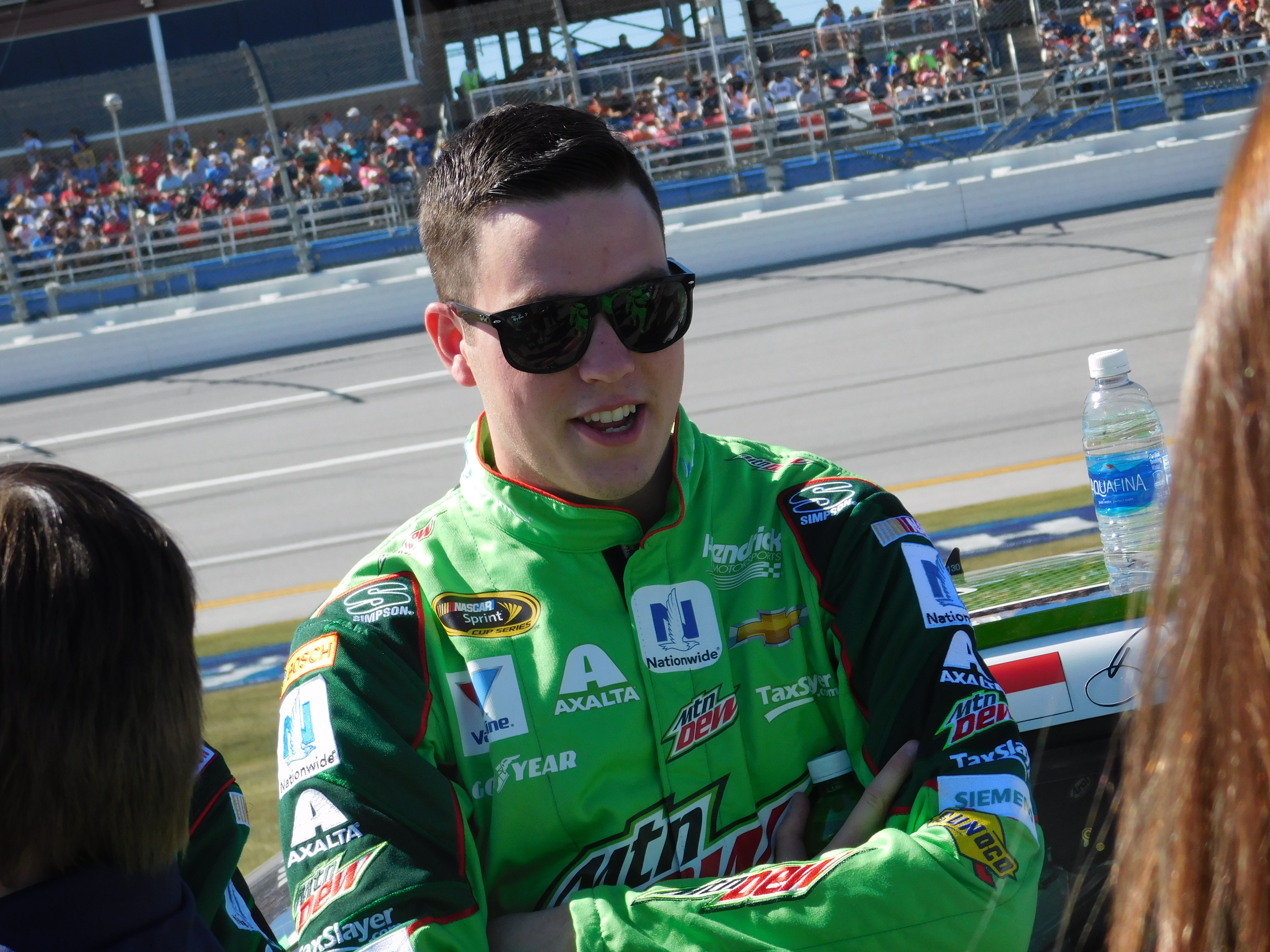
Alex Bowman scored the pole position.

Alex Bowman scored the pole for the race with a time of 25.619 and a speed of 140.521 mph (226.147 km/h). He said afterwards that earning it was "amazing. We weren’t really that strong in qualifying trim in practice. I don’t really know where that came from, but I just can’t thank everybody at Hendrick Motorsports enough. To do this in Phoenix, so close to home, means so much to me. We have had such fast racecars we haven’t had an ounce of luck, but to get a pole here means a lot.”

=== Qualifying results ===
Pos	No.	Driver	Team	Manufacturer	R1	R2	R3
1	88	Alex Bowman (i)	Hendrick Motorsports	Chevrolet	25.831	25.785	25.619
2	42	Kyle Larson	Chip Ganassi Racing	Chevrolet	25.802	25.741	25.666
3	24	Chase Elliott (R)	Hendrick Motorsports	Chevrolet	25.939	25.757	25.671
4	22	Joey Logano	Team Penske	Ford	25.914	25.645	25.689
5	11	Denny Hamlin	Joe Gibbs Racing	Toyota	25.898	25.781	25.701
6	4	Kevin Harvick	Stewart–Haas Racing	Chevrolet	25.761	25.790	25.718
7	3	Austin Dillon	Richard Childress Racing	Chevrolet	25.766	25.730	25.768
8	21	Ryan Blaney (R)	Wood Brothers Racing	Ford	25.836	25.749	25.781
9	1	Jamie McMurray	Chip Ganassi Racing	Chevrolet	25.983	25.807	25.809
10	20	Matt Kenseth	Joe Gibbs Racing	Toyota	26.003	25.818	25.820
11	19	Carl Edwards	Joe Gibbs Racing	Toyota	25.919	25.840	25.843
12	41	Kurt Busch	Stewart–Haas Racing	Chevrolet	25.954	25.788	25.866
13	5	Kasey Kahne	Hendrick Motorsports	Chevrolet	25.892	25.853	
14	2	Brad Keselowski	Team Penske	Ford	25.918	25.855	
15	31	Ryan Newman	Richard Childress Racing	Chevrolet	25.950	25.858	
16	10	Danica Patrick	Stewart–Haas Racing	Chevrolet	26.012	25.859	
17	48	Jimmie Johnson	Hendrick Motorsports	Chevrolet	25.986	25.864	
18	47	A. J. Allmendinger	JTG Daugherty Racing	Chevrolet	26.083	25.905	
19	18	Kyle Busch	Joe Gibbs Racing	Toyota	25.920	25.922	
20	27	Paul Menard	Richard Childress Racing	Chevrolet	26.014	25.951	
21	17	Ricky Stenhouse Jr.	Roush Fenway Racing	Ford	26.042	25.956	
22	13	Casey Mears	Germain Racing	Chevrolet	26.106	26.064	
23	6	Trevor Bayne	Roush Fenway Racing	Ford	26.100	26.118	
24	16	Greg Biffle	Roush Fenway Racing	Ford	26.098	26.195	
25	14	Tony Stewart	Stewart–Haas Racing	Chevrolet	26.120		
26	95	Michael McDowell	Circle Sport – Leavine Family Racing	Chevrolet	26.155		
27	43	Aric Almirola	Richard Petty Motorsports	Ford	26.156		
28	38	Landon Cassill	Front Row Motorsports	Ford	26.245		
29	7	Regan Smith	Tommy Baldwin Racing	Chevrolet	26.284		
30	34	Chris Buescher (R)	Front Row Motorsports	Ford	26.297		
31	23	David Ragan	BK Racing	Toyota	26.382		
32	83	Matt DiBenedetto	BK Racing	Toyota	26.408		
33	44	Brian Scott (R)	Richard Petty Motorsports	Ford	26.440		
34	15	Clint Bowyer	HScott Motorsports	Chevrolet	26.445		
35	32	Jeffrey Earnhardt (R)	Go FAS Racing	Ford	26.608		
36	46	Michael Annett	HScott Motorsports	Chevrolet	26.629		
37	30	Gray Gaulding	The Motorsports Group	Chevrolet	26.699		
38	98	Reed Sorenson	Premium Motorsports	Chevrolet	27.078		
39	55	D. J. Kennington (i)	Premium Motorsports	Chevrolet	27.146		
40	78	Martin Truex Jr.	Furniture Row Racing	Toyota	0.000		
Official qualifying results

== Race ==
=== First half ===
Alex Bowman led the field to the green flag at 2:48 p.m. Kyle Larson brought out the first caution of the race on the first lap after he got loose and spun out in turn 4.

The race restarted on lap 6. During the run, pre-race favorite Kevin Harvick slid back through the field reporting that his car started loose, then started "plowing through the center." Martin Truex Jr., who started 40th, broke into the top-10 on lap 63. A number of cars started pitting under green on lap 79. Trying to get on pit road, Ryan Newman locked up his brakes, spun out and slammed into the rear-end of Larson's car, bringing out the second caution on lap 82. Truex, who was leading the race when the caution flew, was held a lap on pit road for "pulling up to pit." This gave the lead back to Bowman.

The race restarted on lap 91. Joey Logano drove to the outside of Bowman going into turn 1 to take the lead on lap 93. Bowman tried to dive to the inside of Logano going into turn 3 on lap 118, but it cost him second to teammate Jimmie Johnson, who proceeded to pass Logano on the backstretch to take the lead on lap 120. Debris on the fronstretch brought out the third caution on lap 132. Logano exited pit road first. Johnson was held a lap on pit road for "pulling up to pit." Following the race, Johnson said that "guys have been pulling up like that all weekend to go to pit lane. In 15 years that has never been a concern, and I was always told that the last thing NASCAR wanted to do would be to penalize the leader, and as you pull off onto the apron, you accelerate to the commitment line. If you are held by the pace car, you’re at a disadvantage as the leader and it allows everybody to catch you and catch up, so even in drivers’ meetings they’ve said, we know you’re going to pass the pace car; it’s okay. The majority of the tracks we go to, you naturally just gradually pull ahead of the pace car coming to pit lane. I mean, this happens all the time. I am still baffled, and I don’t know if I will stop being baffled, but all I can say is if they called me on it and they continue to call everybody else on it every week, then shame on me.’’

=== Second half ===
The race restarted on lap 140. Bowman pulled up to and passed Logano on the backstretch to retake the lead on lap 158. Debris in turn 1 brought out the fourth caution on lap 210.

The race restarted on lap 218 and Bowman only made it to turn 2 before caution flew for the fifth time when Austin Dillon backed into Greg Biffle and Johnson, and got turned sideways in turn 1.

The race restarted with 84 laps to go. The sixth caution flew with 56 to go for a two-car wreck involving Truex and Newman. Truex went on to finish 40th. Denny Hamlin opted not to pit and assumed the lead. Biffle was sent to the tail end of the field on the restart for speeding on pit road.

The race restarted with 51 to go. Matt Kenseth overtook Hamlin with ease and assumed the lead with 50 to go. Debris in turn 3 brought out the seventh caution with 46 to go.

The race restarted with 43 to go. Bowman demonstrated his car was the fastest in the run to the finish as he worked his way through the top-five to take second with under 20 to go. But the gap from second to Kenseth in the lead was almost four seconds and not closing fast enough. The dynamic of the race changed when Michael McDowell suffered a tire blowout, slammed the wall in turn 3 and brought out the eighth caution with two laps remaining, forcing overtime.

=== Overtime ===
==== First attempt ====
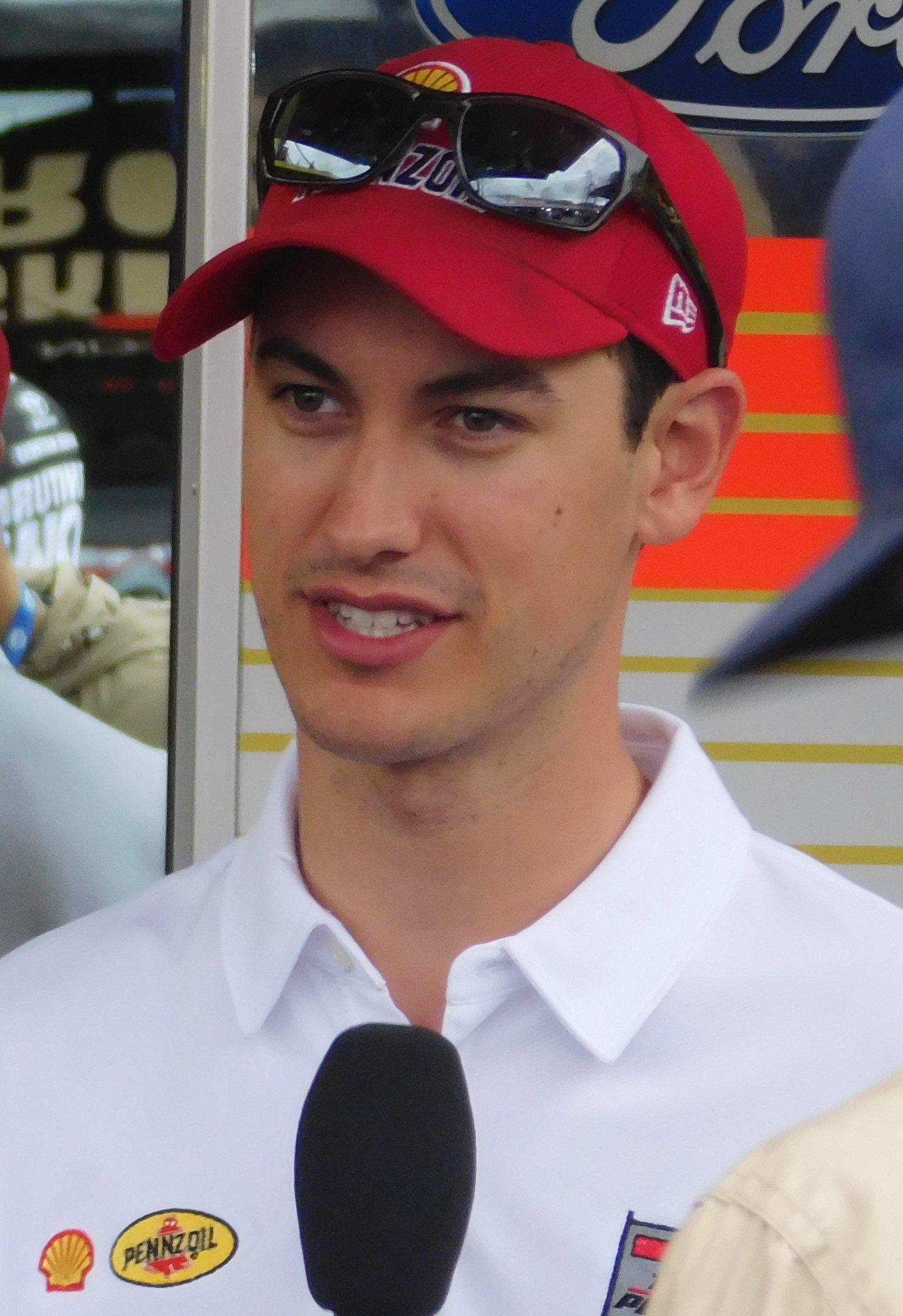
Joey Logano won the race.

On the first overtime attempt with two laps to go, Kyle Busch tried for the inside of Bowman going into the first turn, but Bowman went down to block him and got sideways. This put him at an awkward angle going into the turn and resulted in him inadvertently "punting" Kenseth out of the groove and into the wall, bringing out the ninth caution. “Is there anything I can do or say right now to make it better?” Kenseth asked after the race. “The only thing I can do or say right now is make things worse, so really I’m just trying not to do that.” He added that feeling disappointment "would put it lightly. It finished our season. Five minutes before that, it looked like we were going to have a chance to go race for a championship." Busch took the blame for what happened afterwards saying "I guess I wrecked a teammate. I feel horrible about it ... Right now, it feels really (expletive), but tomorrow it might feel a lot better. ... The 20 should have been the Gibbs car to (advance)." Logano after the race said he "saw Kyle getting a run on him and I was like, 'Oh, boy! I knew Kyle was going to go three wide, and he has to. He's racing for a championship. That's the desperation that sets in." He was also scored as the race leader.

==== Second attempt ====
On the second attempt with two to go, the field made it past the overtime line on the backstretch, making it an official attempt, and Logano drove on to score the victory.

== Post-race ==
=== Driver comments ===
Logano said in victory lane that his win "feels so good. I've never felt this good about a win before. There was so much on the line and everyone brings their A-game when it comes to winning championships and this team did it. Man, this feels so good. I had a good restart there at the end and holding off Kyle to try to get this thing into Miami. We're racing for a championship now. We did exactly what we had to do. We've got to go to Homestead and do the same thing.”

Harvick, who failed to make the Championship 4 for the first time with a fourth-place finish, said he "just started way too far off on Friday. We never got a handle on the racecar. They made it a ton better in the race and we were in contention there at the end and just came up short. Just really proud of everybody for the effort that they put in. It was a very challenging Chase for us for all the mechanical failures and situations that we had going on. We kept rebounding and winning races and today we were a lap down and came back to have a chance at the end. That says a lot about the character of our race team and we just came up short this year.”

Bowman, who led a race high of 194 laps and earned a career-best sixth-place finish, said on the "last couple of restarts, I just didn't do a very good job. We should have been leading that last restart to begin with. That part of it is unfortunate, what happened with (Kenseth). I hate taking somebody out of the Chase like that. It ruined our day, too. There's s no way we should have finished sixth. That's the worst we were all day. It's just frustrating.’’

== Race results ==
Pos	No.	Driver	Team	Manufacturer	Laps	Points
1	22	Joey Logano	Team Penske	Ford	324	44
2	18	Kyle Busch	Joe Gibbs Racing	Toyota	324	39
3	42	Kyle Larson	Chip Ganassi Racing	Chevrolet	324	38
4	4	Kevin Harvick	Stewart–Haas Racing	Chevrolet	324	37
5	41	Kurt Busch	Stewart–Haas Racing	Chevrolet	324	36
6	88	Alex Bowman (i)	Hendrick Motorsports	Chevrolet	324	0
7	11	Denny Hamlin	Joe Gibbs Racing	Toyota	324	35
8	21	Ryan Blaney (R)	Wood Brothers Racing	Ford	324	33
9	24	Chase Elliott (R)	Hendrick Motorsports	Chevrolet	324	32
10	27	Paul Menard	Richard Childress Racing	Chevrolet	324	31
11	1	Jamie McMurray	Chip Ganassi Racing	Chevrolet	324	30
12	31	Ryan Newman	Richard Childress Racing	Chevrolet	324	29
13	5	Kasey Kahne	Hendrick Motorsports	Chevrolet	324	28
14	2	Brad Keselowski	Team Penske	Ford	324	27
15	14	Tony Stewart	Stewart–Haas Racing	Chevrolet	324	26
16	16	Greg Biffle	Roush Fenway Racing	Ford	324	25
17	47	A. J. Allmendinger	JTG Daugherty Racing	Chevrolet	324	24
18	13	Casey Mears	Germain Racing	Chevrolet	324	23
19	19	Carl Edwards	Joe Gibbs Racing	Toyota	324	22
20	38	Landon Cassill	Front Row Motorsports	Ford	324	21
21	20	Matt Kenseth	Joe Gibbs Racing	Toyota	324	21
22	43	Aric Almirola	Richard Petty Motorsports	Ford	322	19
23	17	Ricky Stenhouse Jr.	Roush Fenway Racing	Ford	322	18
24	15	Clint Bowyer	HScott Motorsports	Chevrolet	322	17
25	83	Matt DiBenedetto	BK Racing	Toyota	322	16
26	46	Michael Annett	HScott Motorsports	Chevrolet	321	15
27	7	Regan Smith	Tommy Baldwin Racing	Chevrolet	321	14
28	6	Trevor Bayne	Roush Fenway Racing	Ford	321	13
29	10	Danica Patrick	Stewart–Haas Racing	Chevrolet	320	12
30	44	Brian Scott (R)	Richard Petty Motorsports	Ford	319	11
31	23	David Ragan	BK Racing	Toyota	319	10
32	34	Chris Buescher (R)	Front Row Motorsports	Ford	318	9
33	32	Jeffrey Earnhardt (R)	Go FAS Racing	Ford	318	8
34	95	Michael McDowell	Circle Sport – Leavine Family Racing	Chevrolet	318	7
35	55	D. J. Kennington (i)	Premium Motorsports	Chevrolet	316	0
36	98	Reed Sorenson	Premium Motorsports	Chevrolet	315	5
37	30	Gray Gaulding	The Motorsports Group	Chevrolet	296	4
38	48	Jimmie Johnson	Hendrick Motorsports	Chevrolet	296	4
39	3	Austin Dillon	Richard Childress Racing	Chevrolet	289	2
40	78	Martin Truex Jr.	Furniture Row Racing	Toyota	258	1
Official race results

=== Race summary ===
- Lead changes: 8 among 5 different drivers
- Cautions/Laps: 9 for 53 laps
- Red flags: 0
- Time of race: 3 hours, 8 minutes and 59 seconds
- Average speed: 102.866 miles per hour (165.547 km/h)

== Media ==
=== Television ===
NBC covered the race on the television side, with Rick Allen, two-time Phoenix winner Jeff Burton and Steve Letarte calling the race from the broadcast booth; Dave Burns, Mike Massaro, Marty Snider and Kelli Stavast handled pit road duties.

NBC
Booth announcers	Pit reporters
Lap-by-lap: Rick Allen; Color commentator: Jeff Burton; Color commentator: Steve Letarte	Dave Burns; Mike Massaro; Marty Snider; Kelli Stavast

=== Radio ===
MRN had the radio call for the race, which was simulcast on Sirius XM NASCAR Radio.

MRN
Booth announcers	Turn announcers	Pit reporters
Lead announcer: Joe Moore; Announcer: Jeff Striegle; Announcer: Rusty Wallace	Turns 1 & 2: Dan Hubbard; Turns 3 & 4: Kyle Rickey	Alex Hayden; Winston Kelley; Steve Post

== Standings after the race ==
Drivers' Championship standings

	Pos	Driver	Points
1	1	Joey Logano	5,000
1	2	Jimmie Johnson	5,000 (–0)
4	3	Carl Edwards	5,000 (–0)
1	4	Kyle Busch	5,000 (–0)
1	5	Matt Kenseth	2,296 (–2,704)
1	6	Denny Hamlin	2,288 (–2,712)
1	7	Kurt Busch	2,268 (–2,732)
1	8	Martin Truex Jr.	2,266 (–2,734)
1	9	Brad Keselowski	2,261 (–2,739)
1	10	Chase Elliott	2,255 (–2,745)
5	11	Kevin Harvick	2,250 (–2,750)
	12	Kyle Larson	2,247 (–2,753)
2	13	Jamie McMurray	2,195 (–2,805)
1	14	Austin Dillon	2,194 (–2,806)
1	15	Tony Stewart	2,192 (–2,808)
	16	Chris Buescher	2,152 (–2,848)
Official driver's standings

Manufacturers' Championship standings

Pos	Manufacturer	Points
1	Toyota	1,442
2	Chevrolet	1,412 (–30)
3	Ford	1,351 (–91)
Official manufacturers' standings

- Note: Only the first 16 positions are included for the driver standings.

Previous race: 2016 AAA Texas 500	Sprint Cup Series; 2016 season	Next race: 2016 Ford EcoBoost 400
