= 2016 Hollywood Casino 400 =

Race details
- Race 31 of 36 in the 2016 NASCAR Sprint Cup Series
- Date: October 16, 2016
- Location: Kansas Speedway in Kansas City, Kansas
- Course: Permanent racing facility
- Course length: 1.5 miles (2.4 km)
- Distance: 267 laps, 400.5 mi (640.8 km)
- Average speed: 133.155 miles per hour (214.292 km/h)

Pole position
Driver	Matt Kenseth	Joe Gibbs Racing
- Time: 28.112

Most laps led
Driver	Matt Kenseth	Joe Gibbs Racing
- Laps: 115

Winner
No. 4	Kevin Harvick	Stewart–Haas Racing

Television in the United States
- Network: NBC
- Announcers: Rick Allen, Jeff Burton and Steve Letarte
- Nielsen ratings: 2.0/4 (Overnight); 2.1/4 (Final); 3.4 million viewers

Radio in the United States
- Radio: MRN
- Booth announcers: Joe Moore, Jeff Striegle and Rusty Wallace
- Turn announcers: Dave Moody (1 & 2) and Mike Bagley (3 & 4)

The 2016 Hollywood Casino 400 was a NASCAR Sprint Cup Series race held on October 16, 2016, at Kansas Speedway in Kansas City, Kansas. Contested over 267 laps on the 1.5 mile (2.4 km) intermediate speedway, it was the 31st race of the 2016 NASCAR Sprint Cup Series season, fifth race of the Chase and second race of the Round of 12.

== Entry list ==
No.	Driver	Team	Manufacturer
1	Jamie McMurray	Chip Ganassi Racing	Chevrolet
2	Brad Keselowski	Team Penske	Ford
3	Austin Dillon	Richard Childress Racing	Chevrolet
4	Kevin Harvick	Stewart–Haas Racing	Chevrolet
5	Kasey Kahne	Hendrick Motorsports	Chevrolet
6	Trevor Bayne	Roush Fenway Racing	Ford
7	Regan Smith	Tommy Baldwin Racing	Chevrolet
10	Danica Patrick	Stewart–Haas Racing	Chevrolet
11	Denny Hamlin	Joe Gibbs Racing	Toyota
13	Casey Mears	Germain Racing	Chevrolet
14	Tony Stewart	Stewart–Haas Racing	Chevrolet
15	Clint Bowyer	HScott Motorsports	Chevrolet
16	Greg Biffle	Roush Fenway Racing	Ford
17	Ricky Stenhouse Jr.	Roush Fenway Racing	Ford
18	Kyle Busch	Joe Gibbs Racing	Toyota
19	Carl Edwards	Joe Gibbs Racing	Toyota
20	Matt Kenseth	Joe Gibbs Racing	Toyota
21	Ryan Blaney (R)	Wood Brothers Racing	Ford
22	Joey Logano	Team Penske	Ford
23	David Ragan	BK Racing	Toyota
24	Chase Elliott (R)	Hendrick Motorsports	Chevrolet
27	Paul Menard	Richard Childress Racing	Chevrolet
30	Josh Wise	The Motorsports Group	Chevrolet
31	Ryan Newman	Richard Childress Racing	Chevrolet
32	Joey Gase (i)	Go FAS Racing	Ford
34	Chris Buescher (R)	Front Row Motorsports	Ford
38	Landon Cassill	Front Row Motorsports	Ford
41	Kurt Busch	Stewart–Haas Racing	Chevrolet
42	Kyle Larson	Chip Ganassi Racing	Chevrolet
43	Aric Almirola	Richard Petty Motorsports	Ford
44	Brian Scott (R)	Richard Petty Motorsports	Ford
46	Michael Annett	HScott Motorsports	Chevrolet
47	A. J. Allmendinger	JTG Daugherty Racing	Chevrolet
48	Jimmie Johnson	Hendrick Motorsports	Chevrolet
55	Cole Whitt	Premium Motorsports	Chevrolet
78	Martin Truex Jr.	Furniture Row Racing	Toyota
83	Matt DiBenedetto	BK Racing	Toyota
88	Alex Bowman (i)	Hendrick Motorsports	Chevrolet
95	Michael McDowell	Circle Sport – Leavine Family Racing	Chevrolet
98	Reed Sorenson	Premium Motorsports	Chevrolet
Official entry list

== Practice ==
=== First practice ===
Kyle Busch was the fastest in the first practice session with a time of 27.750 and a speed of 194.595 mph (313.170 km/h).

Pos	No.	Driver	Team	Manufacturer	Time	Speed
1	18	Kyle Busch	Joe Gibbs Racing	Toyota	27.750	194.595
2	41	Kurt Busch	Stewart–Haas Racing	Chevrolet	27.818	194.119
3	19	Carl Edwards	Joe Gibbs Racing	Toyota	27.821	194.098
Official first practice results

=== Second practice ===
Paul Menard was the fastest in the second practice session with a time of 29.241 and a speed of 184.672 mph (297.201 km/h).

Pos	No.	Driver	Team	Manufacturer	Time	Speed
1	27	Paul Menard	Richard Childress Racing	Chevrolet	29.241	184.672
2	4	Kevin Harvick	Stewart–Haas Racing	Chevrolet	29.288	184.376
3	42	Kyle Larson	Chip Ganassi Racing	Chevrolet	29.344	184.024
Official second practice results

=== Final practice ===
Matt Kenseth was the fastest in the final practice session with a time of 28.976 and a speed of 186.361 mph (299.919 km/h). Kurt Busch went to a backup car after he suffered a right-front tire blowout, spun out exiting turn 4 and damaged the front end of his car going through the infield grass.

Pos	No.	Driver	Team	Manufacturer	Time	Speed
1	20	Matt Kenseth	Joe Gibbs Racing	Toyota	28.976	186.361
2	42	Kyle Larson	Chip Ganassi Racing	Chevrolet	29.057	185.842
3	41	Kurt Busch	Stewart–Haas Racing	Chevrolet	29.064	185.797
Official final practice results

== Qualifying ==
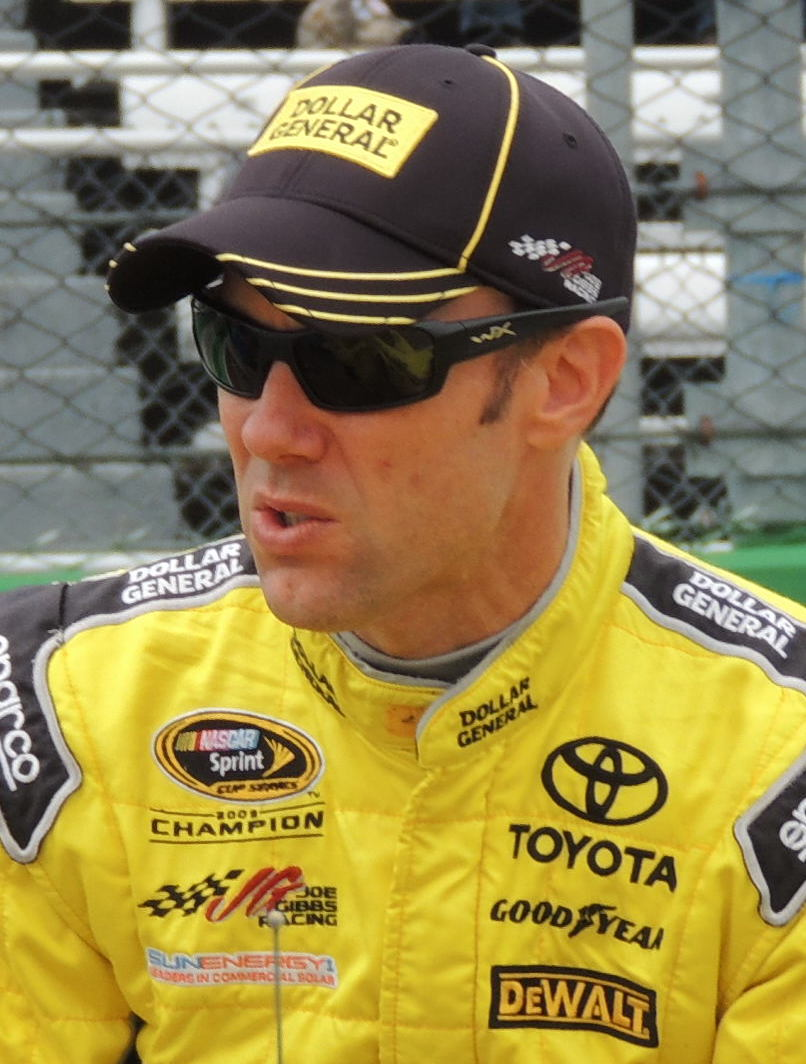
Matt Kenseth scored the pole position.

Matt Kenseth scored the pole for the race with a time of 28.112 and a speed of 192.089 mph (309.137 km/h). After qualifying, Kenseth said it was "nice to get a pole. I feel like our qualifying hasn't been nearly as good this year as it has been in the rest of the years I've been at JGR. We barely got it -- it was by a thousandth, or something like that. Obviously, our Camrys have been fast ... Round one we were pretty decent -- it was off a little bit -- and then round three it was just right. We almost got beat, but it was as good of a lap as we were going to run. They did a good job today."

Kyle Busch, who qualified second, said his car "was pretty good. We certainly felt pretty happy with it earlier today and through practice and having a fast car there. So that was really strong in showing the speed that we have. Just trying to mimic that here today in qualifying. I felt like we did a really good job of that in the second round and I felt even better about my lap in the third round but Matt was just able to get a little bit more out of it. Certainly messed up a little bit just the way the car was balanced through 1 and 2 being prepared for it and being able to get the most out of it. I had to re-lift and get out of the gas in turn two so that’s probably where our time was."

=== Qualifying results ===
Pos	No.	Driver	Team	Manufacturer	R1	R2	R3
1	20	Matt Kenseth	Joe Gibbs Racing	Toyota	28.298	28.243	28.112
2	18	Kyle Busch	Joe Gibbs Racing	Toyota	28.332	28.106	28.113
3	19	Carl Edwards	Joe Gibbs Racing	Toyota	28.451	28.408	28.270
4	78	Martin Truex Jr.	Furniture Row Racing	Toyota	28.481	28.372	28.304
5	88	Alex Bowman (i)	Hendrick Motorsports	Chevrolet	28.609	28.346	28.374
6	22	Joey Logano	Team Penske	Ford	28.371	28.318	28.388
7	11	Denny Hamlin	Joe Gibbs Racing	Toyota	28.570	28.417	28.393
8	2	Brad Keselowski	Team Penske	Ford	28.524	28.419	28.408
9	31	Ryan Newman	Richard Childress Racing	Chevrolet	28.527	28.353	28.432
10	47	A. J. Allmendinger	JTG Daugherty Racing	Chevrolet	28.603	28.369	28.445
11	4	Kevin Harvick	Stewart–Haas Racing	Chevrolet	28.455	28.292	28.484
12	3	Austin Dillon	Richard Childress Racing	Chevrolet	28.596	28.377	28.486
13	24	Chase Elliott (R)	Hendrick Motorsports	Chevrolet	28.625	28.428	
14	14	Tony Stewart	Stewart–Haas Racing	Chevrolet	28.463	28.430	
15	41	Kurt Busch	Stewart–Haas Racing	Chevrolet	28.462	28.455	
16	27	Paul Menard	Richard Childress Racing	Chevrolet	28.527	28.457	
17	21	Ryan Blaney (R)	Wood Brothers Racing	Ford	28.514	28.490	
18	17	Ricky Stenhouse Jr.	Roush Fenway Racing	Ford	28.609	28.513	
19	10	Danica Patrick	Stewart–Haas Racing	Chevrolet	28.483	28.535	
20	5	Kasey Kahne	Hendrick Motorsports	Chevrolet	28.556	28.541	
21	48	Jimmie Johnson	Hendrick Motorsports	Chevrolet	28.486	28.575	
22	16	Greg Biffle	Roush Fenway Racing	Ford	28.581	28.582	
23	1	Jamie McMurray	Chip Ganassi Racing	Chevrolet	28.601	28.709	
24	42	Kyle Larson	Chip Ganassi Racing	Chevrolet	28.653	29.027	
25	6	Trevor Bayne	Roush Fenway Racing	Ford	28.774		
26	7	Regan Smith	Tommy Baldwin Racing	Chevrolet	28.774		
27	93	Matt DiBenedetto	BK Racing	Toyota	28.788		
28	23	David Ragan	BK Racing	Toyota	28.798		
29	13	Casey Mears	Germain Racing	Chevrolet	28.809		
30	34	Chris Buescher (R)	Front Row Motorsports	Ford	28.826		
31	15	Clint Bowyer	HScott Motorsports	Chevrolet	28.839		
32	44	Brian Scott (R)	Richard Petty Motorsports	Ford	28.905		
33	95	Michael McDowell	Circle Sport – Leavine Family Racing	Chevrolet	28.967		
34	38	Landon Cassill	Front Row Motorsports	Ford	29.181		
35	43	Aric Almirola	Richard Petty Motorsports	Ford	29.217		
36	55	Cole Whitt	Premium Motorsports	Chevrolet	29.482		
37	46	Michael Annett	HScott Motorsports	Chevrolet	29.687		
38	32	Joey Gase (i)	Go FAS Racing	Ford	29.907		
39	98	Reed Sorenson	Premium Motorsports	Chevrolet	29.933		
40	30	Josh Wise	The Motorsports Group	Chevrolet	30.025		
Official qualifying results

== Race ==
=== First half ===
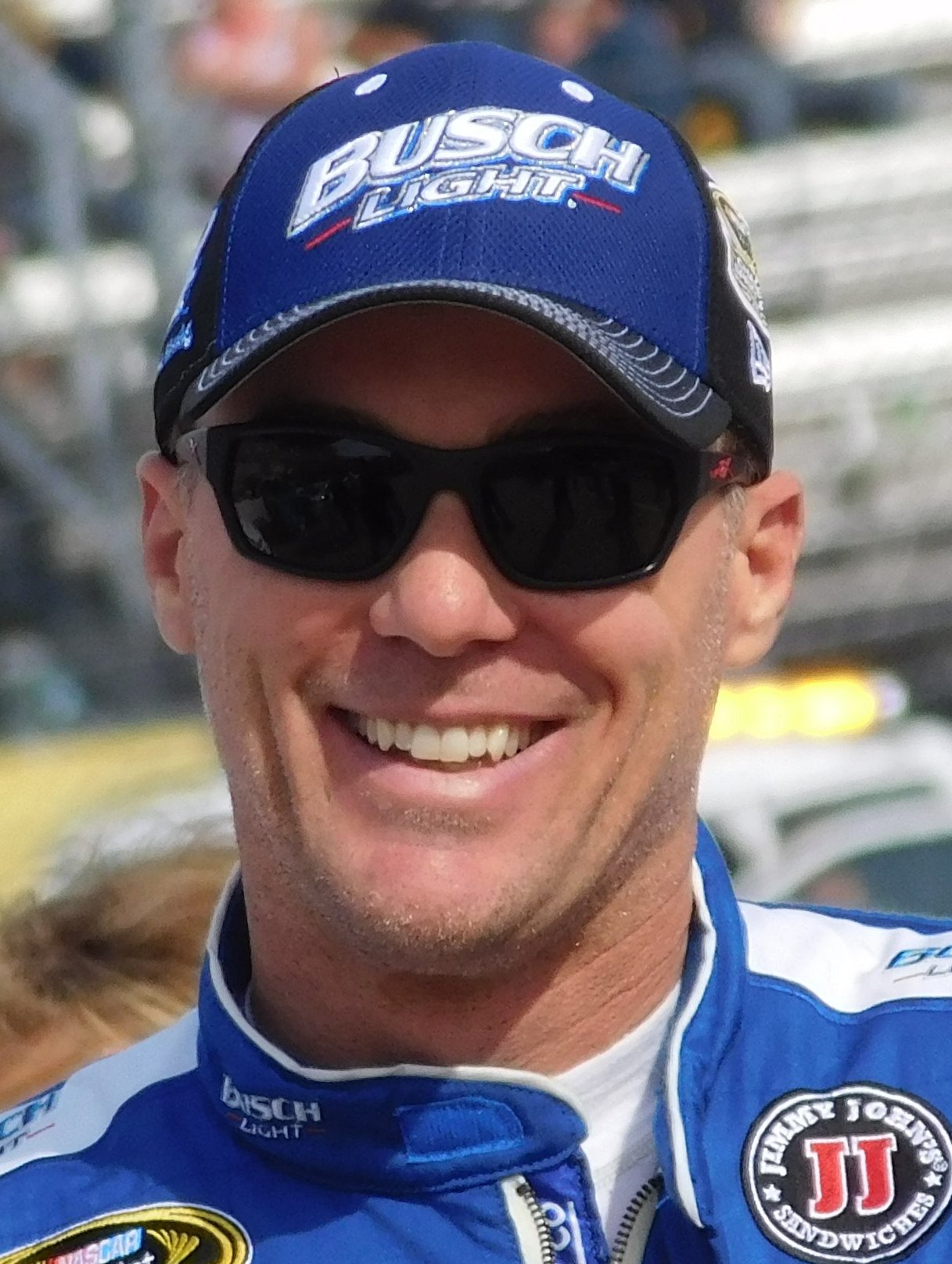
Kevin Harvick won the race.

Under mostly sunny Kansas skies, Matt Kenseth led the field to the green flag at 2:34 p.m. Debris on the backstretch brought out the first caution of the race on lap 26. Brian Scott was sent to the tail end of the field on the restart for speeding on pit road.

The race restarted on lap 31. The second caution flew for a three-car wreck in turn 4 involving Aric Almirola, David Ragan and Scott. Almirola went on to finish 40th.

The race restarted on lap 42. The third caution of the race flew on lap 44 after Jamie McMurray suffered a right-front tire blowout and slammed the wall in turn 3 following contact with Alex Bowman in turn 2.

The race restarted on lap 48. Green flag stops started on lap 83. Kenseth pitted from the lead on lap 87 and handed it to Joey Logano. He pitted the next lap and handed the lead to Brad Keselowski. He pitted the next lap and handed the lead to Denny Hamlin. He pitted the next lap and handed the lead to Casey Mears. He pitted on lap 95 and the lead cycled back to Kenseth.

Martin Truex Jr., who was running in the top-10 and had a problem that prevented him from getting his car completely fueled up, made an unscheduled stop on lap 114. Truex said after the race that he "pitted when [he] had to and hoped for the best. It’s really all you could do. We had a good car when we were up front. It wasn’t great. We were too tight on the short runs to loose on the long runs and we battled the whole run just to try to be OK. And once we lost track position, that made everything worse and magnified it and just really fought all day to get back where we were and then pitted the last stop and only gave up a couple more spots and could never get it back.” Adding insult to injury, Josh Wise slammed the wall in turn 4 and brought out the fourth caution of the race. A. J. Allmendinger was sent to the tail end of the field on the restart for speeding on pit road.

The race restarted on lap 121. Kevin Harvick worked by the outside of Kenseth on the frontstretch to take the lead on lap 128. After working on Harvick for 15 laps, Chase Elliott got a run on him going into turn 1 and took the lead on lap 169. He pitted from the lead on lap 173 and handed it to Carl Edwards. He pitted the next lap and the lead cycled back to Elliott. However, he made an unscheduled stop for a left-rear tire rub. When asked what caused the tire rub, Elliott said he "really [didn't] know. I don't know if we got the left rear getting up on the race track, or something and it got into the fender and cut it down. I don't know what to do man, we were trying as hard as we can. We had such a good car today again, and....I don't know what to do. Just keep after it and try to move on." The lead went to Edwards on lap 176. At the same time, Kyle Larson slammed the wall in turn 2 and brought out the fifth caution of the race.

=== Second half ===
The race restarted on lap 184. The sixth caution flew with 77 laps to go after Keselowski got loose exiting turn 4, drove through the infield grass and destroyed the front-end of his car. Keselowski said after that he "spun out, got in the grass and tore the nose off. I probably could have raced a little bit less hard; you know, I had a big points gap coming here, with this format it's probably the smart thing to do. But I don't want to race like that. I want to race my guts out, I want to go for wins. I don't want to points race. I don't care what the damn format is, I'm going to go out and give it my best.”

The race restarted with 69 laps to go. When Keselowski returned to the race with 45 laps to go, his engine let go, dropped fluid on the track in turn 3 and brought out the seventh caution of the race. Austin Dillon exited pit road first after taking right-side tires. Hamlin was sent to the tail end of the field on the restart for an uncontrolled tire.

The race restarted with 42 laps to go. Edwards made easy work of Dillon on the restart to retake the lead. The eighth caution of the race flew with 34 laps to go after Regan Smith slammed the wall in turn 3.

The race restarted with 30 laps to go. Harvick got the better of Edwards on the restart and retook the lead. Elliott's day went from bad to worse when he suffered a left-rear tire blowout, started losing speed and made another unscheduled stop. Harvick drove on to score the victory.

== Post-race ==
=== Driver comments ===
In victory lane, Harvick said of his motivation following disappointing runs at Dover and Charlotte that he thought "the best thing is that we prepare this thing for every race. I try every week to find something to motivate myself and I know these guys do the same thing. It’s hard to keep yourself motivated and continue to perform at a high level. Being able to do it for three years now says a lot about the character of this team and the things that they do. It is like they say, anything that is really, really hard to get and come by, there are going to be some obstacles and some bumps in the road. I am just really proud of everyone at Stewart–Haas Racing.”

Edwards said that he "ran well, and that was really fun, we raced out front,” Edwards said. “It is really tough for me to finish second here. ... We'll just move forward. A day or two will pass, and maybe this thing will wear off, and I'll be more excited about the points situation going into Talladega, because that's the bright side.” He expanded on coming up short again at his self-described home track saying there are "so many people that come to this racetrack that support me and have supported me. Not just when I’m racing here, but Capitol Speedway, Old Summit, Callaway Raceway, Godfrey, all these places I raced growing up. It’s a really special place for me. As much fun as I had racing up front, yeah, it stings. There are negative emotions tied to not winning here with that fast of a car. But that's the way it goes.”

== Race results ==
Pos	No.	Driver	Team	Manufacturer	Laps	Points
1	4	Kevin Harvick	Stewart–Haas Racing	Chevrolet	267	44
2	19	Carl Edwards	Joe Gibbs Racing	Toyota	267	40
3	22	Joey Logano	Team Penske	Ford	267	39
4	48	Jimmie Johnson	Hendrick Motorsports	Chevrolet	267	37
5	18	Kyle Busch	Joe Gibbs Racing	Toyota	267	36
6	3	Austin Dillon	Richard Childress Racing	Chevrolet	267	36
7	88	Alex Bowman (i)	Hendrick Motorsports	Chevrolet	267	0
8	47	A. J. Allmendinger	JTG Daugherty Racing	Chevrolet	267	33
9	20	Matt Kenseth	Joe Gibbs Racing	Toyota	267	34
10	5	Kasey Kahne	Hendrick Motorsports	Chevrolet	267	31
11	78	Martin Truex Jr.	Furniture Row Racing	Toyota	267	30
12	31	Ryan Newman	Richard Childress Racing	Chevrolet	267	29
13	41	Kurt Busch	Stewart–Haas Racing	Chevrolet	267	29
14	21	Ryan Blaney (R)	Wood Brothers Racing	Ford	267	27
15	11	Denny Hamlin	Joe Gibbs Racing	Toyota	267	27
16	14	Tony Stewart	Stewart–Haas Racing	Chevrolet	267	25
17	6	Trevor Bayne	Roush Fenway Racing	Ford	267	24
18	10	Danica Patrick	Stewart–Haas Racing	Chevrolet	267	23
19	17	Ricky Stenhouse Jr.	Roush Fenway Racing	Ford	267	22
20	27	Paul Menard	Richard Childress Racing	Chevrolet	267	21
21	34	Chris Buescher (R)	Front Row Motorsports	Ford	267	20
22	95	Michael McDowell	Circle Sport – Leavine Family Racing	Chevrolet	267	19
23	13	Casey Mears	Germain Racing	Chevrolet	267	19
24	83	Matt DiBenedetto	BK Racing	Toyota	267	17
25	16	Greg Biffle	Roush Fenway Racing	Ford	266	16
26	15	Clint Bowyer	HScott Motorsports	Chevrolet	266	15
27	38	Landon Cassill	Front Row Motorsports	Ford	266	14
28	44	Brian Scott (R)	Richard Petty Motorsports	Ford	265	13
29	7	Regan Smith	Tommy Baldwin Racing	Chevrolet	265	12
30	42	Kyle Larson	Chip Ganassi Racing	Chevrolet	265	11
31	24	Chase Elliott (R)	Hendrick Motorsports	Chevrolet	264	11
32	46	Michael Annett	HScott Motorsports	Chevrolet	264	9
33	55	Cole Whitt	Premium Motorsports	Chevrolet	262	8
34	98	Reed Sorenson	Premium Motorsports	Chevrolet	261	7
35	32	Joey Gase (i)	Go FAS Racing	Ford	260	0
36	23	David Ragan	BK Racing	Toyota	258	5
37	1	Jamie McMurray	Chip Ganassi Racing	Chevrolet	223	4
38	2	Brad Keselowski	Team Penske	Ford	190	4
39	30	Josh Wise	The Motorsports Group	Chevrolet	108	2
40	43	Aric Almirola	Richard Petty Motorsports	Ford	36	1
Official race results

=== Race summary ===
- Lead changes: 10 among different drivers
- Cautions/Laps: 8 for 38
- Red flags: 0
- Time of race: 3 hours, 0 minutes and 28 seconds
- Average speed: 133.155 miles per hour (214.292 km/h)

== Media ==
=== Television ===
NBC covered the race on the television side. Rick Allen, Jeff Burton and Steve Letarte had the call in the booth for the race. Dave Burns, Mike Massaro, Marty Snider and Kelli Stavast will handle pit road on the television side.

NBC
Booth announcers	Pit reporters
Lap-by-lap: Rick Allen; Color-commentator: Jeff Burton; Color-commentator: Steve Letarte	Dave Burns; Mike Massaro; Marty Snider; Kelli Stavast

=== Radio ===
MRN had the radio call for the race, which was simulcast on Sirius XM NASCAR Radio.

MRN
Booth announcers	Turn announcers	Pit reporters
Lead announcer: Joe Moore; Announcer: Jeff Striegle; Announcer: Rusty Wallace	Turns 1 & 2: Dave Moody; Turns 3 & 4: Mike Bagley	Kim Coon; Steve Post; Dillon Welch

== Standings after the race ==
Drivers' Championship standings

	Pos	Driver	Points
	1	Jimmie Johnson	3,082
	2	Matt Kenseth	3,074 (–8)
	3	Kyle Busch	3,072 (–10)
2	4	Carl Edwards	3,069 (–13)
	5	Kurt Busch	3,062 (–20)
1	6	Martin Truex Jr.	3,058 (–24)
5	7	Kevin Harvick	3,048 (–34)
3	8	Joey Logano	3,045 (–37)
	9	Austin Dillon	3,045 (–37)
2	10	Denny Hamlin	3,039 (–43)
7	11	Brad Keselowski	3,038 (–44)
2	12	Chase Elliott	3,020 (–62)
1	13	Tony Stewart	2,131 (–951)
1	14	Kyle Larson	2,120 (–962)
1	15	Chris Buescher	2,090 (–996)
1	16	Jamie McMurray	2,088 (–994)
Official driver's standings

Manufacturers' Championship standings

Pos	Manufacturer	Points
1	Toyota	1,281
2	Chevrolet	1,255 (–26)
3	Ford	1,183 (–98)
Official manufacturers' standings

- Note: Only the first 16 positions are included for the driver standings.

Previous race: 2016 Bank of America 500	Sprint Cup Series; 2016 season	Next race: 2016 Hellmann's 500
