= Union Bank & Trust Company =

American bank company

Union Bank & Trust
- Formerly: Farmer's State Bank (1917-1935); Union Bank (1935-1959)
- Type: Private
- Industry: Banking
- Founded: February 28, 1917; 109 years ago
- Headquarters: Lincoln, Nebraska, United States
- Website: ubt.com

Union Bank & Trust Company is an American privately held, state chartered commercial bank headquartered in Lincoln, Nebraska, United States. The bank was originally established as Farmer's State Bank on February 28, 1917. It became Union Bank in 1935 and adopted its current name in 1959 with the addition of trust powers.

UBT was purchased in 1965 by the Dunlaps, a long-time Nebraska banking family, and remains family-owned today under its third generation of leadership. In 2023, Jason Muhleisen succeeded Angie Muhleisen as President and CEO, continuing the family legacy of leadership.

As of June 30, 2025, UBT is the third-largest bank in Nebraska, with $8.8 billion in bank assets and $42.7 billion in trust assets under management. The bank operates more than 30 full-service and loan production offices across Nebraska, Kansas, and Colorado.

UBT offers a full range of banking, lending, investment and trust services. It also serves as the program manager for Nebraska's NEST 529 College Savings Plan, a nationally recognized education savings program.

== History ==
- 1917: Founded as Farmer’s State Bank
- 1935: Renamed Union Bank
- 1959: Added trust powers; became Union Bank & Trust Company
- 1965: Purchased by the Dunlap family
- 1985–2006: Expanded through acquisitions of several Nebraska banks and one Kansas
- bank

== Leadership & Culture ==
UBT has been led by the Dunlap family for three generations. Jay Dunlap served as the bank’s first Chief Executive Officer after the Dunlap family purchased it in 1965, guiding the organization for more than three decades. Under Jay’s leadership, UBT became known as “the bank of friendly service,” establishing a culture of caring that remains central today: caring for customers, caring for the community, and caring for each other. Angie Muhleisen, Jay’s daughter, continued that legacy during her tenure as President and CEO from 1996 to 2023. Today, Jason Muhleisen, Angie’s son, leads the bank with the same commitment to people and purpose.

== Community Involvement ==
Union Bank &Trust is deeply rooted in its communities, supporting local nonprofits, education initiatives, and financial literacy programs. The bank has been recognized multiple times in the Lincoln’s Choice Awards for excellence in banking and customer service. UBT’s culture of caring extends beyond banking, with employees actively volunteering and contributing to causes that strengthen the communities they serve.
