= Blake Koch =

American racing driver (born 1985)

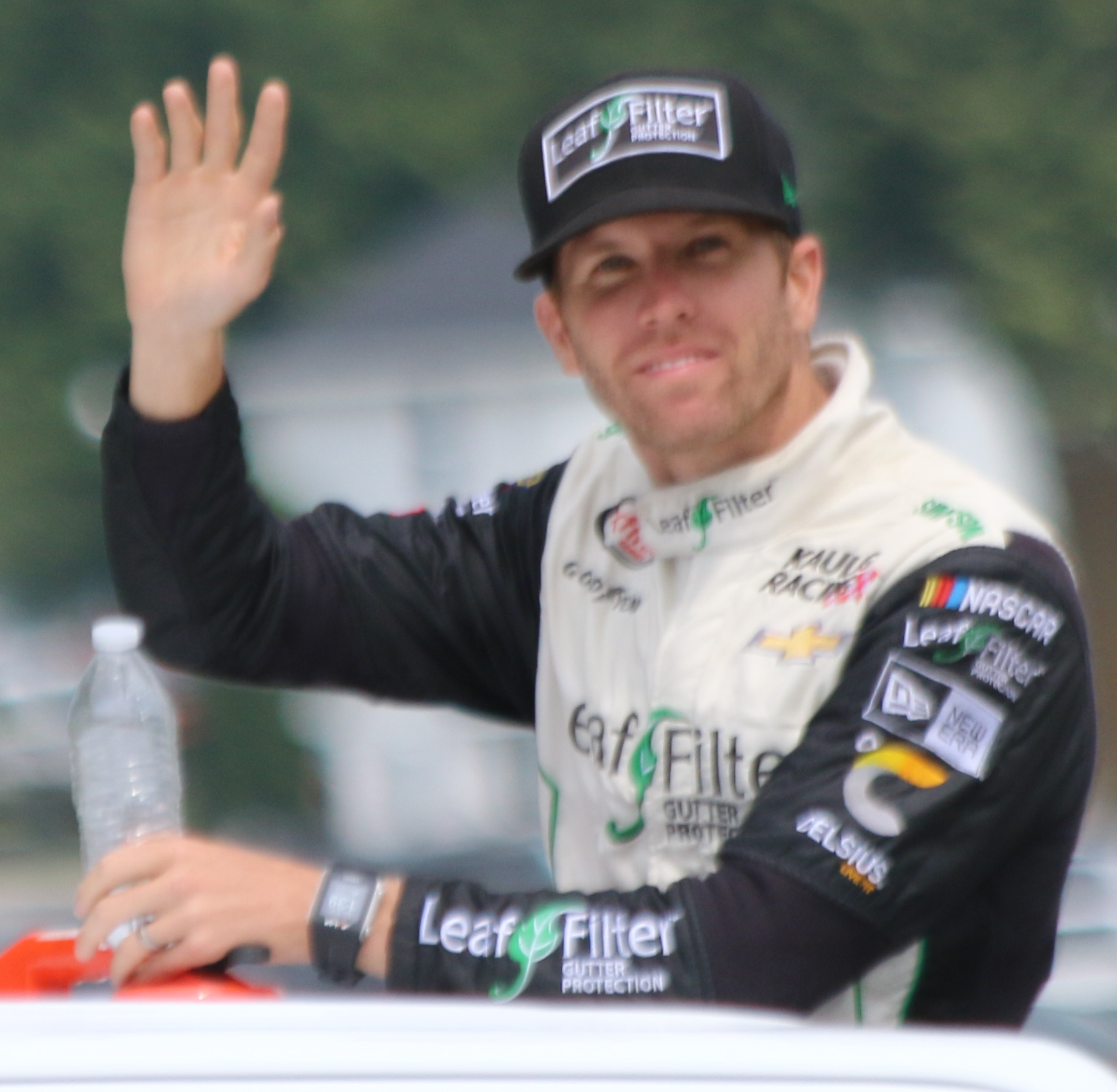
- Koch at Road America in 2017
- Born: August 7, 1985 (age 41); West Palm Beach, Florida, U.S.

NASCAR Cup Series career
- 6 races run over 2 years
- 2014 position: 67th
- Best finish: 67th (2014)
- First race: 2013 Bank of America 500 (Charlotte)
- Last race: 2014 Ford EcoBoost 400 (Homestead)
Wins	Top tens	Poles
0	0	0

NASCAR O'Reilly Auto Parts Series career
- 213 races run over 8 years
- 2017 position: 11th
- Best finish: 7th (2016)
- First race: 2009 Kroger On Track for the Cure 250 (Memphis)
- Last race: 2017 Ford EcoBoost 300 (Homestead)
Wins	Top tens	Poles
0	10	1

NASCAR FedEx Freight Truck Series career
- 10 races run over 3 years
- 2014 position: 109th
- Best finish: 100th (2012)
- First race: 2012 American Ethanol 225 (Joilet)
- Last race: 2014 WinStar World Casino & Resort 350 (Texas)
Wins	Top tens	Poles
0	0	0
- Statistics up to date as of November 18, 2017.

Blake Koch (born August 7, 1985) is an American semi-retired professional stock car racing driver and businessman. He last competed in the NASCAR Xfinity Series, driving the No. 11 Chevrolet Camaro for Kaulig Racing. He is also the founder of FilterTime, a residential air filter company that delivers the filters to consumer's homes on a regular basis.

== Racing career ==
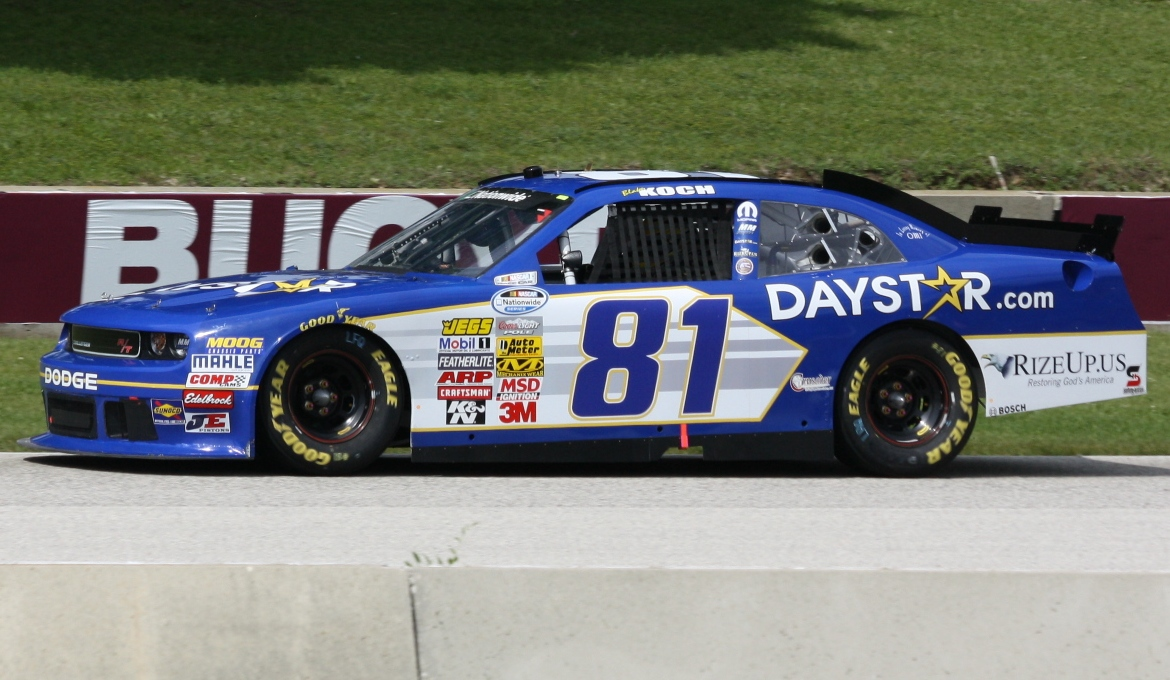
Koch racing at Road America in 2011

Koch began his racing career at the age of 22 after he graduated from college with an associate degree in Marketing and Business Degree at Northwood University. Prior to racing on four wheels, Koch raced on two wheels and was considered one of the top twenty motocross riders in the state of Florida. Koch raced eight years until the end of 2008 when he made the transition to NASCAR. In 2009, he started racing in the NASCAR Camping World West Series. He finished eighth in the final point standings and finished runner up in the Rookie of the Year standings. In 2011, he made his first Nationwide Series race at Phoenix and finished seventeenth and on the lead lap. He earned four top-twenty finishes in 2011 and finished eighteenth in the final point standings.

Koch planned to compete for Rick Ware Racing in the 2012 Nationwide Series driving the No. 41. Partway through the season Koch was switched to the No. 15 when Timmy Hill returned to Nationwide competition, and soon afterwards was forced to switch to a limited schedule due to a lack of sponsorship. Koch lost the sponsor after the accompanying ESPN ad campaign was denied for "political and religious overtones".

For 2013, Koch could not find a full-time ride, and was forced to start-and-park for SR² Motorsports, for which he had driven a limited start-and-park schedule late in 2012. Koch ran most of the season in the team's No. 24 and No. 00 Toyotas. The team ran full races on occasion. In October, he made his debut in the Sprint Cup Series, driving for Leavine Family Racing at Charlotte Motor Speedway.

Later in 2013, Koch finally caught a break, landing a ride with RAB Racing in the Nationwide Series finale at Homestead-Miami Speedway, where he started on the outside pole.

However, again unable to find a full-time ride, Koch moved to TriStar Motorsports for the 2014 NASCAR Nationwide Series season, for the most part running the team's start-and-park entries which help fund TriStar's full-time teams. He also signed with Front Row Motorsports to drive the No. 35 Ford in the Sprint Cup Series for a limited schedule of races. He also ran a handful of races for Go FAS Racing as well.

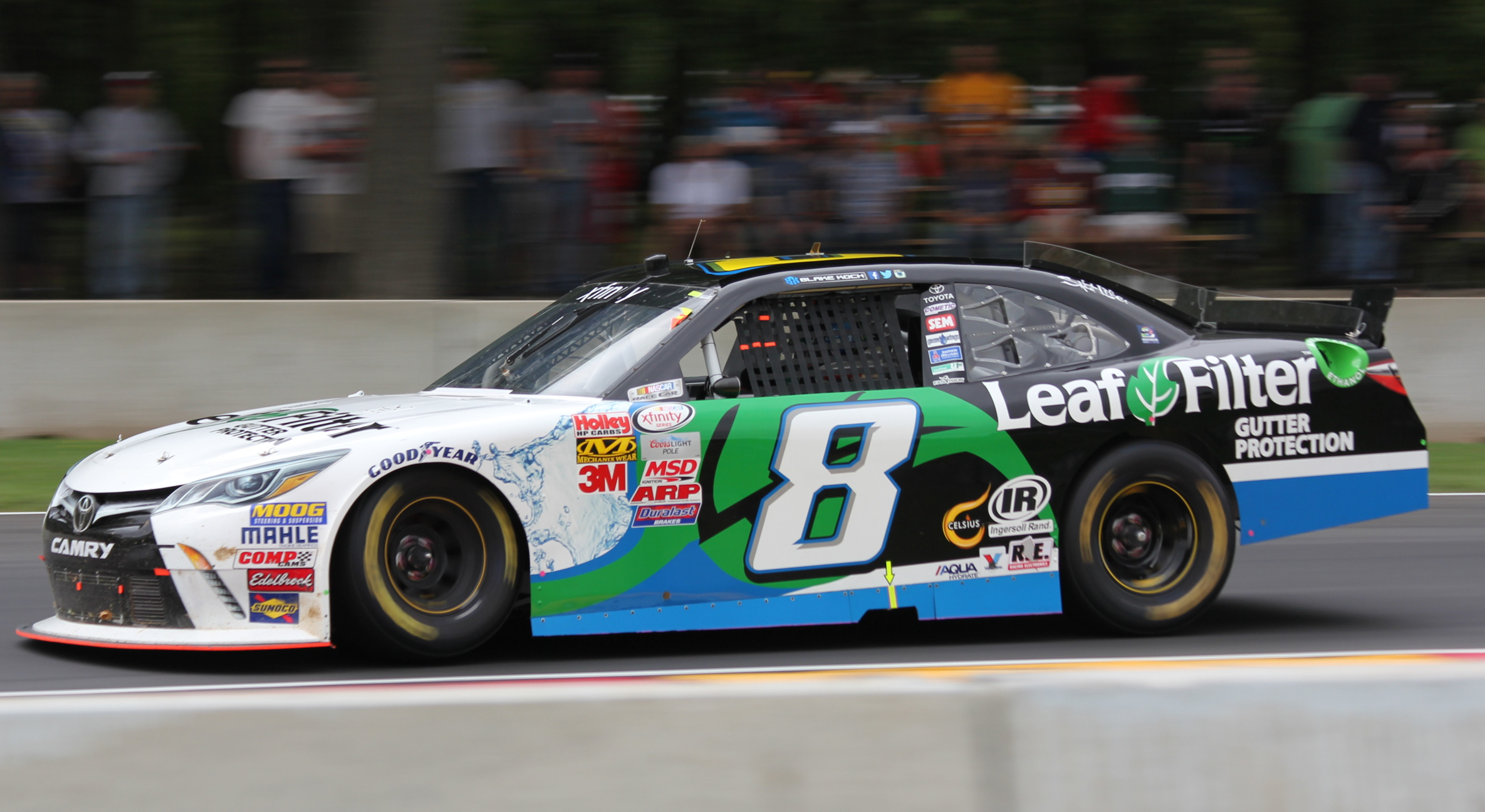
Koch's 2015 Xfinity Series car at Road America

In 2015, Koch was finally given a full-time ride by TriStar Motorsports for the full Xfinity Series (formerly Nationwide Series) in the No. 8 Toyota with LeafFilter Gutter Protection as a primary sponsor. Koch was leading with six laps to go in Road America when the battery died, resulting in a twentieth place finish. After the race, Koch described the race as the closest he had come to winning in his entire career.

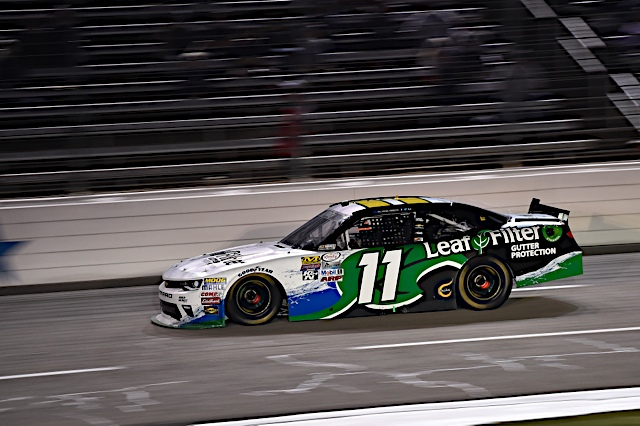
Koch at Texas Motor Speedway in 2016.

In 2016, LeafFilter owner Matt Kaulig left TriStar to start his own team, Kaulig Racing, with an alliance with Richard Childress Racing. Koch came over as well, running the full season in the No. 11 LeafFilter Gutter Protection Chevrolet. Koch finished ninth at the season opener at Daytona, his first top-ten of his career. Koch went on to have the best season of his career, scoring five top-tens and qualifying for the inaugural Xfinity Series playoffs. Koch would finish seventh in points, by far his best career NASCAR performance.

In 2017, Koch returned to Kaulig Racing for another full-time Xfinity season with LeafFilter.

On January 9, 2018, it was announced that Ryan Truex would take over Koch's No. 11 ride. Koch knew in the later stages of December that LeafFilter would not return in a large role and that he needed to find sponsorship to stay with the team. Kaulig has stated that he would like to retain Koch in a second car dependent on sponsorship. Koch has stated that he has been contacted by teams in all three of NASCAR's national series and that he would be content with a full or part-time ride in any of those series. He instead served as a driver coach for Matt Tifft and as an analyst for the "Blake's Take" segment of NASCAR Race Hub.

After not driving at all in 2018, on December 4, Koch announced he would be joining JD Motorsports in their No. 4 entry in the Xfinity Series in 2019, left vacant by Ross Chastain. Koch's company FilterTime was announced as a sponsor of the team. On January 31, 2019, Koch stepped down from the ride to focus on his FilterTime business after it was announced that Chastain was returning to the team. Koch continued his driver coaching in 2019, working with Harrison Burton.

== Personal life ==
Born in West Palm Beach, Florida, Koch currently resides in Huntersville, North Carolina with his wife Shannon and their son, Carter and daughter, Bailey.

Koch is a Christian. Koch has spoken about his faith saying, "[God has] given me this platform that people listen to me and I feel like I have a great opportunity to tell people about Jesus through that."

Koch appeared in a commercial for the voting awareness organization Rise Up and Register; however, it was rejected by ESPN due to "religious and political overtones"; despite there being no religious messages in the commercial. ESPN later issued a statement saying, "Koch’s personal religious beliefs played no role in our evaluation."

Koch is the founder and owner of FilterTime, a residential air filter delivery service. The business was founded in 2017 after losing his ride with Kaulig Racing, formed for the purpose of funding his racing career. Dale Earnhardt Jr. became a partner in the company in April 2019.

== Motorsports career results ==
=== NASCAR ===
(key) (Bold – Pole position awarded by qualifying time. Italics – Pole position earned by points standings or practice time. * – Most laps led.)

==== Sprint Cup Series ====
NASCAR Sprint Cup Series results
Year	Team	No.	Make	1	2	3	4	5	6	7	8	9	10	11	12	13	14	15	16	17	18	19	20	21	22	23	24	25	26	27	28	29	30	31	32	33	34	35	36	NSCC	Pts	Ref
2013	Leavine Family Racing	95	Ford	DAY	PHO	LVS	BRI	CAL	MAR	TEX	KAN	RCH	TAL	DAR	CLT	DOV	POC	MCH	SON	KEN	DAY	NHA	IND	POC	GLN	MCH	BRI	ATL	RCH	CHI	NHA	DOV	KAN	CLT; 38	TAL	MAR	TEX	PHO	HOM	74th	0^{1}	
2014	Front Row Motorsports	35	Ford	DAY	PHO; 37	LVS; DNQ	BRI	CAL	MAR	TEX	DAR	RCH	TAL	KAN																										67th	0^{1}	
2014	Go FAS Racing	32	Ford												CLT; 35	DOV; 30	POC	MCH	SON	KEN	DAY	NHA	IND	POC	GLN	MCH	BRI	ATL	RCH	CHI	NHA	DOV	KAN	CLT; 39	TAL	MAR	TEX	PHO	HOM; 38	67th	0^{1}	

==== Xfinity Series ====
NASCAR Xfinity Series results
Year	Team	No.	Make	1	2	3	4	5	6	7	8	9	10	11	12	13	14	15	16	17	18	19	20	21	22	23	24	25	26	27	28	29	30	31	32	33	34	35	NXSC	Pts	Ref
2009	MacDonald Motorsports	81	Dodge	DAY	CAL	LVS	BRI	TEX	NSH	PHO	TAL	RCH	DAR	CLT	DOV	NSH	KEN	MLW	NHA	DAY	CHI	GTY	IRP	IOW	GLN	MCH	BRI	CGV	ATL	RCH	DOV	KAN	CAL	CLT	MEM; 17	TEX		HOM; 24	102nd	173	
2009	Day Enterprises	05	Chevy																																		PHO; DNQ		102nd	173	
2010	Day Enterprises	05	Chevy	DAY	CAL	LVS	BRI	NSH	PHO	TEX	TAL	RCH	DAR	DOV	CLT	NSH	KEN	ROA	NHA	DAY	CHI	GTY	IRP	IOW; 22	GLN	MCH	BRI	CGV	ATL	RCH	DOV	KAN	CAL	CLT	GTY	TEX	PHO	HOM	115th	97	
2011	MacDonald Motorsports	81	Dodge	DAY	PHO; 27	LVS	BRI; 30	CAL; 33	TEX; 25		NSH; 25	RCH; 27	DAR; 18		IOW; 21	CLT; 34	CHI; 27	MCH; 25	ROA; 14	DAY; 28	KEN; 22	NHA; 18	NSH; 27	IRP; 20	IOW; 28	GLN; 29		BRI; 23	ATL; 23	RCH; 27		DOV; 21	KAN; 25			PHO; 14			18th	610	
2011	MacDonald Motorsports	82	Dodge							TAL; 16				DOV; 43																									18th	610	
2011	MacDonald Motorsports	70	Dodge																								CGV; 38												18th	610	
2011	MacDonald Motorsports	52	Dodge																												CHI; 27								18th	610	
2011	MacDonald Motorsports	81	Chevy																															CLT; 18	TEX; 22		HOM; 23		18th	610	
2012	Rick Ware Racing	41	Ford	DAY; 17	PHO; 31	LVS; 18	BRI; 38																																31st	230	
2012	Rick Ware Racing	41	Chevy					CAL; 25																															31st	230	
2012	Rick Ware Racing	15	Chevy						TEX; 36			DAR; 34	IOW; 40	CLT	DOV; 41	MCH; 36	ROA	KEN; 41																					31st	230	
2012	Rick Ware Racing	75	Chevy							RCH; 39	TAL; DNQ																												31st	230	
2012	MacDonald Motorsports	82	Dodge																DAY; 19	NHA																			31st	230	
2012	The Motorsports Group	42	Chevy																		CHI; 36	IND	IOW	GLN	CGV; 41														31st	230	
2012	SR² Motorsports	00	Chevy																							BRI; DNQ	ATL; 36	RCH; 37											31st	230	
2012	SR² Motorsports	00	Toyota																										CHI; 36	KEN			KAN; 36	TEX; 38	PHO; 39	HOM; 39			31st	230	
2012	SR² Motorsports	24	Toyota																												DOV; 22	CLT							31st	230	
2013	SR² Motorsports	24	Toyota	DAY; 38	PHO; 16	LVS; 21	BRI; 25	CAL; 32	TEX; 24	RCH; 25						MCH; 22	ROA				CHI; 27	IND				BRI; 31													25th	349	
2013	SR² Motorsports	00	Toyota								TAL; 33	DAR; 22	CLT	DOV; 40	IOW; 36			KEN; 34	DAY; DNQ	NHA; 37			IOW; 38	GLN; 36	MOH; 40		ATL; 40	RCH	CHI; 38	KEN; 39	DOV; 30	KAN; 37	CLT; 38	TEX; 36	PHO; 38				25th	349	
2013	RAB Racing	99	Toyota																																	HOM; 11			25th	349	
2014	TriStar Motorsports	44	Toyota	DAY; 22		LVS; 20					RCH; 21					MCH; 24	ROA	KEN; 19									ATL; 28			KEN; 25	DOV; 23				PHO; 18	HOM; 22			24th	317	
2014	TriStar Motorsports	10	Toyota		PHO; 39		BRI; 40	CAL; 39	TEX; 40	DAR; 40		TAL; 40	IOW	CLT	DOV; 40				DAY; DNQ	NHA; 39	CHI; 39	IND; 40	IOW; 38	GLN; 38	MOH; 35				CHI; 40			KAN; 36	CLT	TEX; 39					24th	317	
2014	Rick Ware Racing	23	Chevy																							BRI; 35													24th	317	
2014	TriStar Motorsports	91	Toyota																									RCH; 38											24th	317	
2015	TriStar Motorsports	8	Toyota	DAY; 20	ATL; 22	LVS; 35	PHO; 25	CAL; 19	TEX; 32	BRI; 22	RCH; 24	TAL; 23	IOW; 22	CLT; 23	DOV; 30	MCH; 36	CHI; 22	DAY; 18	KEN; 22	NHA; 20	IND; 37	IOW; 24	GLN; 18	MOH; 24	BRI; 21	ROA; 21	DAR; 27	RCH; 19	CHI; 21	KEN; 40	DOV; 23	CLT; 33	KAN; 25	TEX; 21	PHO; 20	HOM; 18			17th	646	
2016	Kaulig Racing	11	Chevy	DAY; 9	ATL; 20	LVS; 26	PHO; 16	CAL; 12	TEX; 34	BRI; 37	RCH; 8	TAL; 24	DOV; 12	CLT; 14	POC; 15	MCH; 13	IOW; 13	DAY; 22	KEN; 14	NHA; 32	IND; 15	IOW; 13	GLN; 35	MOH; 12	BRI; 8	ROA; 18	DAR; 19	RCH; 15	CHI; 15	KEN; 11	DOV; 14	CLT; 12	KAN; 9	TEX; 14	PHO; 8	HOM; 20			7th	2200	
2017	Kaulig Racing	11	Chevy	DAY; 15	ATL; 40	LVS; 12	PHO; 13	CAL; 12	TEX; 16	BRI; 9	RCH; 11	**TAL**; 31	CLT; 19	DOV; 32	POC; 27	MCH; 17	IOW; 25	DAY; 38	KEN; 23	NHA; 13	IND; 17	IOW; 8	GLN; 22	MOH; 11	BRI; 14	ROA; 7	DAR; 11	RCH; 11	CHI; 9	KEN; 17	DOV; 19	CLT; 25	KAN; 23	TEX; 13	PHO; 6	HOM; 16			11th	2138	

==== Camping World Truck Series ====
NASCAR Camping World Truck Series results
Year	Team	No.	Make	1	2	3	4	5	6	7	8	9	10	11	12	13	14	15	16	17	18	19	20	21	22	NCWTC	Pts	Ref
2012	Alger Motorsports	86	Ram	DAY	MAR	CAR	KAN	CLT	DOV	TEX	KEN	IOW	CHI; 32	POC	MCH	BRI; QL^{†}										100th	0^{1}	
2012	JJC Racing	0	Ford														ATL; 35	IOW	KEN; 36	LVS	TAL	MAR; Wth	TEX; DNQ	PHO; 36	HOM; 36	100th	0^{1}	
2013	FDNY Racing	28	Chevy	DAY	MAR	CAR	KAN	CLT; 19	DOV	TEX	KEN	IOW	ELD	POC	MCH	BRI	MSP	IOW	CHI	LVS	TAL	MAR	TEX	PHO	HOM	101st	0^{1}	
2014	SS-Green Light Racing	07	Chevy	DAY	MAR	KAN	CLT; 30																			109th	0^{1}	
2014	MB Motorsports	36	Ram					DOV; 35	TEX	GTW	KEN	IOW	ELD	POC	MCH	BRI; 35	MSP	CHI	NHA	LVS	TAL	MAR				109th	0^{1}	
2014	MB Motorsports	36	Chevy																				TEX; 32	PHO	HOM	109th	0^{1}	
^{†} - Qualified for Clay Greenfield

==== K&N Pro Series West ====
NASCAR K&N Pro Series West results
Year	Team	No.	Make	1	2	3	4	5	6	7	8	9	10	11	12	13	NKNPSWC	Pts	Ref
2008	Jim Offenbach	31	Chevy	AAS	PHO	CTS	IOW	CNS	SON	IRW	DCS	EVG	MMP	IRW	AMP	AAS; 22	68th	97	
2009	Jim Offenbach	21	Chevy	CTS; 11	AAS; 5	PHO; 7	MAD; 13	IOW; 9	DCS; 7	SON; 11	IRW; 8	PIR; 12	MMP; 9	CNS; 14	IOW; 20	AAS; 14	8th	1726	
2010	Jim Offenbach	21	Chevy	AAS; 9	PHO; 28	IOW; 5	DCS; 3	SON; 29	IRW; 2	PIR; 6	MRP; 7	CNS; 10	MMP	AAS	PHO		13th	1223	

=== ARCA Racing Series ===
(key) (Bold – Pole position awarded by qualifying time. Italics – Pole position earned by points standings or practice time. * – Most laps led.)

ARCA Racing Series results
Year	Team	No.	Make	1	2	3	4	5	6	7	8	9	10	11	12	13	14	15	16	17	18	19	20	ARSC	Pts	Ref
2010	Eddie Sharp Racing	6	Toyota	DAY	PBE; 3	SLM	TEX	TAL	TOL	POC	MCH	IOW	MFD	POC	BLN	NJE	ISF	CHI	DSF	TOL	SLM	KAN	CAR	81st	220	

^{*} Season still in progress
^{1} Ineligible for series points
