= 2014 The Profit on CNBC 500 =

Car race

Race details
- Race 2 of 36 in the 2014 NASCAR Sprint Cup Series
- Date: March 2, 2014
- Location: Phoenix International Raceway in Avondale, Arizona
- Course: Permanent racing facility
- Course length: 1.0 miles (1.6 km)
- Distance: 312 laps, 312 mi (502.115 km)
- Weather: Temperatures reaching up to 72 °F (22 °C); wind speeds up to 15.9 miles per hour (25.6 km/h)
- Average speed: 109.229 mph (175.787 km/h)

Pole position
| Driver | Brad Keselowski | Team Penske |
- Time: 25.828 seconds

Most laps led
| Driver | Kevin Harvick | Stewart–Haas Racing |
- Laps: 224

Winner
| No. 4 | Kevin Harvick | Stewart–Haas Racing |

Television in the United States
- Network: Fox & MRN
- Announcers: Mike Joy, Darrell Waltrip and Larry McReynolds (Television); Joe Moore and Jeff Striegle (Booth); Dan Hubbard (Backstretch) (Radio)
- Nielsen ratings: 5.3/11 (Final); 4.8/9 (Overnight); 8.8 Million viewers

The 2014 The Profit on CNBC 500 was a NASCAR Sprint Cup Series stock car race held on March 2, 2014, at Phoenix International Raceway in Avondale, Arizona. Contested over 312 laps on the 1 mile (1.6 km) asphalt tri-oval, it was the second race of the 2014 NASCAR Sprint Cup Series. Kevin Harvick won the race, his first win driving for Stewart–Haas Racing, while Dale Earnhardt Jr. finished second. Brad Keselowski, Joey Logano, and Jeff Gordon rounded out the top five. The top rookies of the race were Kyle Larson (20th), Austin Dillon (24th), and Cole Whitt (27th).

== Previous week's race ==
Although close on fuel and with a piece of bear bond from Ryan Newman's car stuck to his grill, Dale Earnhardt Jr. took off on the last restart of the Daytona 500 at Daytona International Speedway, moving in front of Jeff Gordon. Over the course of the last lap, an intense battle for the runner-up spots unfolded between Jimmie Johnson, Gordon, Brad Keselowski, and Denny Hamlin. Heading through turn 4, Kevin Harvick tried to force himself between Jamie McMurray and Kyle Busch in turn 4, and a wreck ensued as Harvick was sent into the wall, collecting a number of other cars including McMurray, Busch, Carl Edwards, and Reed Sorenson. While that was happening, Earnhardt Jr. held off Hamlin and took the checkered flag to score his second Daytona 500 victory. Earnhardt Jr. stated that his car was "awesome" and after some help from Gordon on the restart, Earnhardt Jr. "just took care of it from there".

== Report ==
=== Background ===
Phoenix International Raceway, the race track where the race was held.

The track, Phoenix International Raceway, is one of five short tracks to hold NASCAR races, the others being Richmond International Raceway, Dover International Speedway, Bristol Motor Speedway, and Martinsville Speedway. The standard track at Phoenix International Raceway is a four-turn short track oval that is 1 mile (1.6 km) long. The track's first two turns are banked from 10–11 degrees, while the third and fourth turns have an 8–9 degree banking. The front stretch, the location of the finish line, is banked at 3 degrees, and the back stretch has a 10–11 degree banking. The racetrack has seats for 55,000 spectators. The 2013 winner was Carl Edwards.

==== Entry list ====
The entry list for The Profit on CNBC 500 was released on February 24 at 11:22 a.m. Eastern time. Forty-six drivers were entered for the race.

| No. | Driver | Team | Manufacturer |
|---|---|---|---|
| 1 | Jamie McMurray | Chip Ganassi Racing | Chevrolet |
| 2 | Brad Keselowski (PC2) | Team Penske | Ford |
| 3 | Austin Dillon (R) | Richard Childress Racing | Chevrolet |
| 4 | Kevin Harvick | Stewart–Haas Racing | Chevrolet |
| 5 | Kasey Kahne | Hendrick Motorsports | Chevrolet |
| 7 | Michael Annett (R) | Tommy Baldwin Racing | Chevrolet |
| 9 | Marcos Ambrose | Richard Petty Motorsports | Ford |
| 10 | Danica Patrick | Stewart–Haas Racing | Chevrolet |
| 11 | Denny Hamlin | Joe Gibbs Racing | Toyota |
| 13 | Casey Mears | Germain Racing | Chevrolet |
| 14 | Tony Stewart (PC3) | Stewart–Haas Racing | Chevrolet |
| 15 | Clint Bowyer | Michael Waltrip Racing | Toyota |
| 16 | Greg Biffle | Roush-Fenway Racing | Ford |
| 17 | Ricky Stenhouse Jr. | Roush-Fenway Racing | Ford |
| 18 | Kyle Busch | Joe Gibbs Racing | Toyota |
| 20 | Matt Kenseth (PC5) | Joe Gibbs Racing | Toyota |
| 22 | Joey Logano | Team Penske | Ford |
| 23 | Alex Bowman (R) | BK Racing | Toyota |
| 24 | Jeff Gordon (PC6) | Hendrick Motorsports | Chevrolet |
| 26 | Cole Whitt (R) | Swan Racing | Toyota |
| 27 | Paul Menard | Richard Childress Racing | Chevrolet |
| 30 | Parker Kligerman (R) | Swan Racing | Toyota |
| 31 | Ryan Newman | Richard Childress Racing | Chevrolet |
| 32 | Travis Kvapil | Go FAS Racing | Ford |
| 33 | Brian Scott (i) | Richard Childress Racing | Chevrolet |
| 34 | David Ragan | Front Row Motorsports | Ford |
| 35 | Blake Koch (i) | Front Row Motorsports | Ford |
| 36 | Reed Sorenson | Tommy Baldwin Racing | Chevrolet |
| 38 | David Gilliland | Front Row Motorsports | Ford |
| 40 | Landon Cassill (i) | Circle Sport | Chevrolet |
| 41 | Kurt Busch (PC4) | Stewart–Haas Racing | Chevrolet |
| 42 | Kyle Larson (R) | Chip Ganassi Racing | Chevrolet |
| 43 | Aric Almirola | Richard Petty Motorsports | Ford |
| 47 | A. J. Allmendinger | JTG Daugherty Racing | Chevrolet |
| 48 | Jimmie Johnson (PC1) | Hendrick Motorsports | Chevrolet |
| 51 | Justin Allgaier (R) | HScott Motorsports | Chevrolet |
| 55 | Brian Vickers | Michael Waltrip Racing | Toyota |
| 66 | Joe Nemechek (i) | Michael Waltrip Racing | Toyota |
| 77 | Dave Blaney | Randy Humphrey Racing | Ford |
| 78 | Martin Truex Jr. | Furniture Row Racing | Chevrolet |
| 83 | Ryan Truex (R) | BK Racing | Toyota |
| 87 | Morgan Shepherd (i) | Identity Ventures Racing | Toyota |
| 88 | Dale Earnhardt Jr. | Hendrick Motorsports | Chevrolet |
| 95 | Michael McDowell | Leavine Family Racing | Ford |
| 98 | Josh Wise | Phil Parsons Racing | Chevrolet |
| 99 | Carl Edwards | Roush-Fenway Racing | Ford |
Official entry list

| Key | Meaning |
|---|---|
| (R) | Rookie |
| (i) | Ineligible for points |
| (PC#) | Past champions provisional |

== Practice ==
=== First practice ===
Dale Earnhardt Jr. was the fastest in the first practice session with a time of 25.951 and a speed of 138.723 mph (223.253 km/h).

| Pos | No. | Driver | Team | Manufacturer | Time | Speed |
|---|---|---|---|---|---|---|
| 1 | 88 | Dale Earnhardt Jr. | Hendrick Motorsports | Chevrolet | 25.951 | 138.723 |
| 2 | 22 | Joey Logano | Team Penske | Ford | 26.022 | 138.344 |
| 3 | 18 | Kyle Busch | Joe Gibbs Racing | Toyota | 26.042 | 138.238 |
Official first practice results

== Qualifying ==
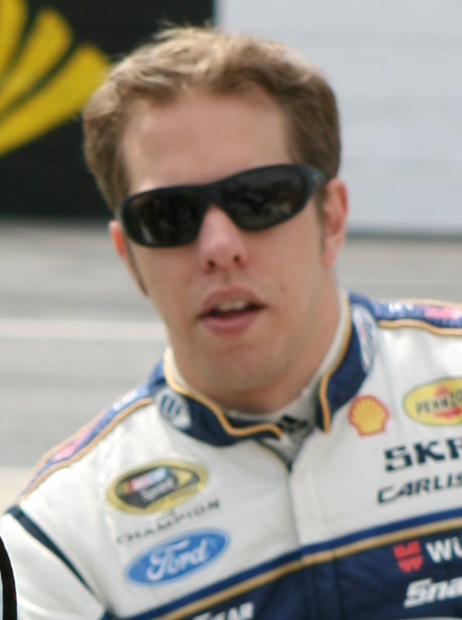
Brad Keselowski won the pole position, setting a new track record.

In the first running of NASCAR's new-for-2014 knockout qualifying system, Brad Keselowski won the pole with a new track record time of 25.828 and a speed of 139.384 mph (224.317 km/h). Keselowski was intrigued as to how the qualifying session looked to the general public, stating "I'm more curious the feedback we get from our fans" and that "at the end of the day it's not about whether I like it, it's about whether they liked it". Kevin Harvick, who missed out on the top 12 placings by 0.001 seconds in the first part of the session, complained about the cooling of the cars, defining it as "dumb", while also praising the qualifying concept as "really cool, but they need to let you cool the cars down. One of these times somebody is going to get clobbered in the back". NASCAR did not allow teams to use cool-down units and teams were forced to run cool down laps on the track while other drivers were making qualifying laps. Defending champion Jimmie Johnson opined that everyone understood "what NASCAR is trying to do, and I'm confident that if there is a problem they'll make some changes". NASCAR vice president for competition Robin Pemberton stated that the organization would "continue to talk to the drivers and teams and solicit feedback and how, if anything, we can improve". Justin Allgaier crashed his car during the opening session, switched to a backup car and started last as a result.

=== Qualifying results ===
| Pos | No. | Driver | Team | Manufacturer | R1 | R2 |
|---|---|---|---|---|---|---|
| 1 | 2 | Brad Keselowski | Team Penske | Ford | 25.968 | 25.828 |
| 2 | 22 | Joey Logano | Team Penske | Ford | 25.864 | 25.850 |
| 3 | 1 | Jamie McMurray | Chip Ganassi Racing | Chevrolet | 26.091 | 25.905 |
| 4 | 48 | Jimmie Johnson | Hendrick Motorsports | Chevrolet | 26.057 | 26.021 |
| 5 | 88 | Dale Earnhardt Jr. | Hendrick Motorsports | Chevrolet | 26.090 | 26.022 |
| 6 | 16 | Greg Biffle | Roush Fenway Racing | Ford | 26.054 | 26.023 |
| 7 | 18 | Kyle Busch | Joe Gibbs Racing | Toyota | 25.995 | 26.027 |
| 8 | 42 | Kyle Larson (R) | Chip Ganassi Racing | Chevrolet | 26.046 | 26.027 |
| 9 | 43 | Aric Almirola | Richard Petty Motorsports | Ford | 26.091 | 26.034 |
| 10 | 41 | Kurt Busch | Stewart–Haas Racing | Chevrolet | 26.040 | 26.078 |
| 11 | 5 | Kasey Kahne | Hendrick Motorsports | Chevrolet | 26.089 | 26.108 |
| 12 | 11 | Denny Hamlin | Joe Gibbs Racing | Toyota | 26.121 | 26.217 |
| 13 | 4 | Kevin Harvick | Stewart–Haas Racing | Chevrolet | 26.122 | |
| 14 | 15 | Clint Bowyer | Michael Waltrip Racing | Toyota | 26.123 | |
| 15 | 31 | Ryan Newman | Richard Childress Racing | Chevrolet | 26.126 | |
| 16 | 55 | Brian Vickers | Michael Waltrip Racing | Toyota | 26.127 | |
| 17 | 24 | Jeff Gordon | Hendrick Motorsports | Chevrolet | 26.136 | |
| 18 | 13 | Casey Mears | Germain Racing | Chevrolet | 26.165 | |
| 19 | 20 | Matt Kenseth | Joe Gibbs Racing | Toyota | 26.173 | |
| 20 | 14 | Tony Stewart | Stewart–Haas Racing | Chevrolet | 26.185 | |
| 21 | 17 | Ricky Stenhouse Jr. | Roush Fenway Racing | Ford | 26.187 | |
| 22 | 27 | Paul Menard | Richard Childress Racing | Chevrolet | 26.211 | |
| 23 | 99 | Carl Edwards | Roush Fenway Racing | Ford | 26.236 | |
| 24 | 3 | Austin Dillon (R) | Richard Childress Racing | Chevrolet | 26.239 | |
| 25 | 47 | A. J. Allmendinger | JTG Daugherty Racing | Chevrolet | 26.243 | |
| 26 | 95 | Michael McDowell | Leavine Family Racing | Ford | 26.265 | |
| 27 | 78 | Martin Truex Jr. | Furniture Row Racing | Chevrolet | 26.296 | |
| 28 | 38 | David Gilliland | Front Row Motorsports | Ford | 26.303 | |
| 29 | 9 | Marcos Ambrose | Richard Petty Motorsports | Ford | 26.317 | |
| 30 | 34 | David Ragan | Front Row Motorsports | Ford | 26.318 | |
| 31 | 26 | Cole Whitt (R) | Swan Racing | Toyota | 26.330 | |
| 32 | 33 | Brian Scott | Richard Childress Racing | Chevrolet | 26.331 | |
| 33 | 10 | Danica Patrick | Stewart–Haas Racing | Chevrolet | 26.365 | |
| 34 | 83 | Ryan Truex (R) | BK Racing | Toyota | 26.495 | |
| 35 | 23 | Alex Bowman (R) | BK Racing | Toyota | 26.546 | |
| 36 | 30 | Parker Kligerman (R) | Swan Racing | Toyota | 26.591 | |
| 37 | 35 | Blake Koch | Front Row Motorsports | Ford | 26.615 | |
| 38 | 66 | Joe Nemechek | Identity Ventures Racing | Toyota | 26.670 | |
| 39 | 36 | Reed Sorenson | Tommy Baldwin Racing | Chevrolet | 26.687 | |
| 40 | 32 | Travis Kvapil | FAS Lane Racing | Ford | 26.712 | |
| 41 | 7 | Michael Annett (R) | Tommy Baldwin Racing | Chevrolet | 26.836 | |
| 42 | 87 | Morgan Shepherd | Identity Ventures Racing | Toyota | 27.908 | |
| 43 | 51 | Justin Allgaier (R) (Note: Justin Allgaier started from the rear after crashing his car in qualifying.) | HScott Motorsports | Chevrolet | — | |
Did Not Qualify (DNQ)
| | 98 | Josh Wise | Phil Parsons Racing | Chevrolet | 26.610 | — |
| | 40 | Landon Cassill | Circle Sport | Chevrolet | 26.644 | — |
| | 77 | Dave Blaney | Randy Humphrey Racing | Ford | 26.818 | — |
Official qualifying results

== Practice (post-qualifying) ==
=== Second practice ===
Harvick was the fastest in the second practice session with a time of 26.133 and a speed of 137.757 mph (221.698 km/h).

| Pos | No. | Driver | Team | Manufacturer | Time | Speed |
|---|---|---|---|---|---|---|
| 1 | 4 | Kevin Harvick | Stewart–Haas Racing | Chevrolet | 26.133 | 137.757 |
| 2 | 1 | Jamie McMurray | Chip Ganassi Racing | Chevrolet | 26.310 | 136.830 |
| 3 | 42 | Kyle Larson (R) | Chip Ganassi Racing | Chevrolet | 26.310 | 136.830 |
Official second practice results

=== Final practice ===
Kevin Harvick was also the fastest in the final practice session with a time of 26.285 and a speed of 136.960 mph (220.416 km/h).

| Pos | No. | Driver | Team | Manufacturer | Time | Speed |
|---|---|---|---|---|---|---|
| 1 | 4 | Kevin Harvick | Stewart–Haas Racing | Chevrolet | 26.285 | 136.960 |
| 2 | 42 | Kyle Larson (R) | Chip Ganassi Racing | Chevrolet | 26.355 | 136.596 |
| 3 | 31 | Ryan Newman | Richard Childress Racing | Chevrolet | 26.372 | 136.508 |
Official final practice results

== Race ==
=== First half ===
==== Start ====
The race started at 3:20 p.m. with Brad Keselowski leading the field to the green flag, but he did not keep the lead for long as his teammate Joey Logano passed him to lead the first lap. Logano led the race for the entire first stint, ahead of a competition caution on lap 36, due to overnight downpours. Keselowski won the race off pit road to assume the lead, for the restart on lap 41. Just as it was at the first start, Logano assumed the lead on the first lap following the restart, and he held the lead until Kevin Harvick moved ahead on lap 74. Harvick held the lead until a scheduled pit stop on lap 111; Keselowski reassumed the lead before a pit stop of his own on lap 113, and Harvick returned to the head of the race for the next stint. The second caution of the race flew on lap 162, caused by debris on the frontstretch. Brian Vickers' car cut down a right-front tire and hit the wall in turn 3 under that caution.

=== Second half ===
==== Halfway ====
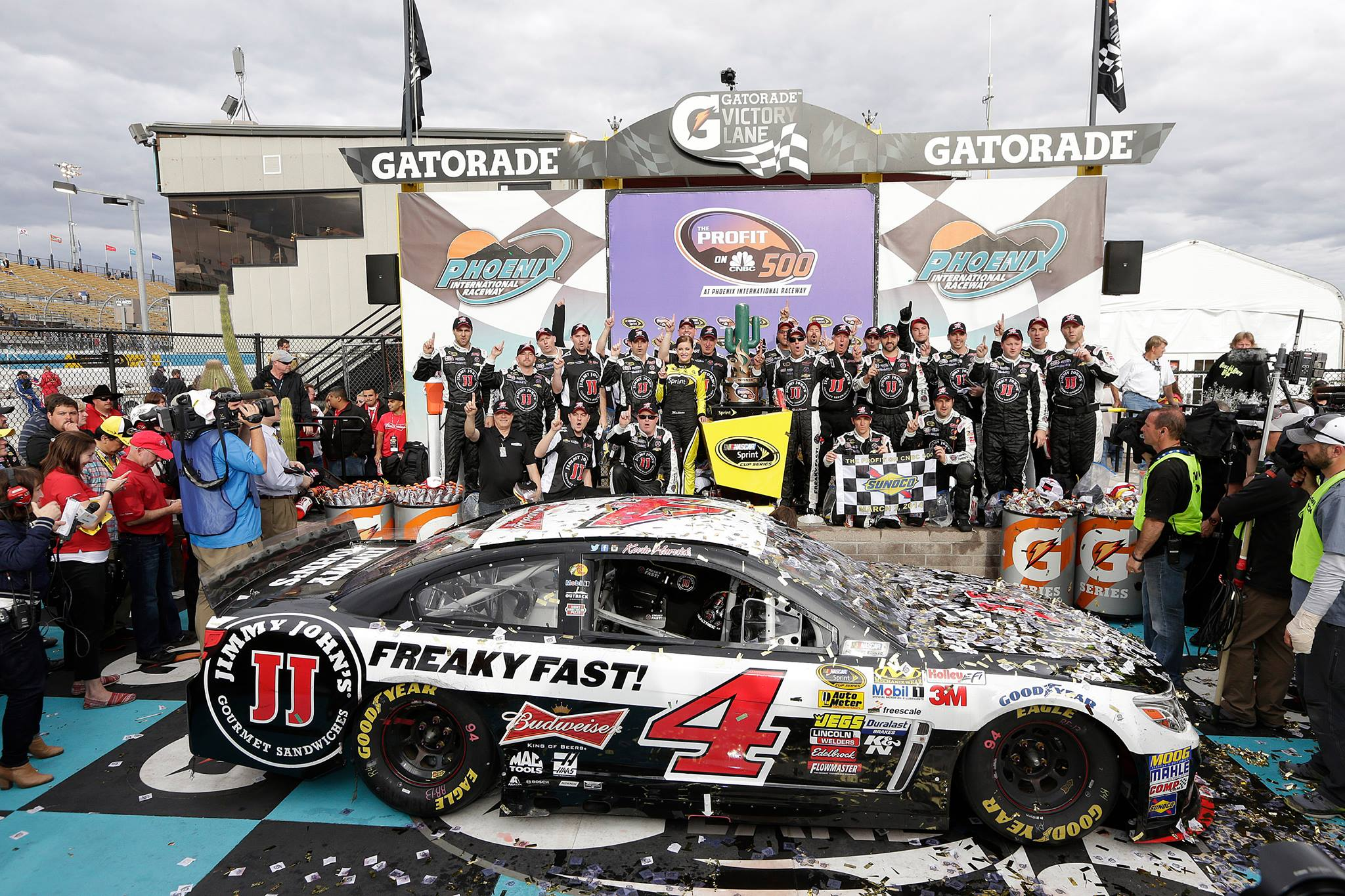
Kevin Harvick won the race.

The race restarted on lap 170, but was almost immediately back under yellow flag conditions, after a multi-car incident which brought out the third caution. Danica Patrick made contact with Justin Allgaier going into turn 1 and both spun out. Travis Kvapil made contact with Patrick trying to avoid her. Allgaier and Patrick discussed the incident post-race, with Allgaier telling the media that Patrick "was just upset because she got involved in the crash that we had", and that "she's been through this and that she felt like I needed to settle down at that point". The race restarted on lap 176, with Harvick maintaining the lead. The fourth caution of the race flew on lap 187 after Patrick went high into the groove in turn 1, cut the left-rear tire and spun through 180 degrees before coming to a stop.

The race restarted on lap 192, with Harvick leading once again for the next stint, leading all the way to his next pit stop, with 76 laps to go and Carl Edwards assumed the lead position. Jeff Gordon and Ryan Newman also had stints at the head of the race, with Newman leading the race at the time of the fifth caution of the race, caused by debris on the backstretch, with 66 laps to go. Newman swapped positions with Clint Bowyer on pit road and the lead cycled back to Harvick, for the restart with 61 laps to go. The sixth caution of the race flew with 35 laps to go for debris in turn 1, with the restart coming with 30 laps to go. With 27 laps to go, David Gilliland's left-rear tire delaminated in turn 1, and in the circuit's dogleg, he over-corrected the car and spun around bringing out the seventh caution of the race. The race restarted with 21 laps to go, before the eighth caution of the race flew with 16 laps to go, after Kurt Busch's engine failed.

==== Finish ====
The race restarted with nine laps to go and Harvick held off Dale Earnhardt Jr. to score the victory. Harvick praised by his team for the efforts in the early part of the season, since his move from Richard Childress Racing, stating "to add an extra team, bring in a bunch of new guys, new driver, Rodney Childers has just done a phenomenal job of putting this team together. These guys all want to win that is why they came here". He added that he was "really happy" with the engine that had been provided by Hendrick Motorsports. Earnhardt Jr. was disappointed to miss out on the victory, stating that he "would have loved to have won the race, am a little disappointed to have come that close", but like Harvick, praised his team for their performances, adding that they have "a lot of great chemistry and good communication going back and forth. Everybody's confidence is very high. Everybody's mood and morale is really high".

=== Race results ===
| Pos | No. | Driver | Team | Manufacturer | Laps | Points |
|---|---|---|---|---|---|---|
| 1 | 4 | Kevin Harvick | Stewart–Haas Racing | Chevrolet | 312 | 48 |
| 2 | 88 | Dale Earnhardt Jr. | Hendrick Motorsports | Chevrolet | 312 | 42 |
| 3 | 2 | Brad Keselowski | Team Penske | Ford | 312 | 42 |
| 4 | 22 | Joey Logano | Team Penske | Ford | 312 | 41 |
| 5 | 24 | Jeff Gordon | Hendrick Motorsports | Chevrolet | 312 | 40 |
| 6 | 48 | Jimmie Johnson | Hendrick Motorsports | Chevrolet | 312 | 38 |
| 7 | 31 | Ryan Newman | Richard Childress Racing | Chevrolet | 312 | 38 |
| 8 | 99 | Carl Edwards | Roush Fenway Racing | Ford | 312 | 37 |
| 9 | 18 | Kyle Busch | Joe Gibbs Racing | Toyota | 312 | 35 |
| 10 | 1 | Jamie McMurray | Chip Ganassi Racing | Chevrolet | 312 | 34 |
| 11 | 5 | Kasey Kahne | Hendrick Motorsports | Chevrolet | 312 | 33 |
| 12 | 20 | Matt Kenseth | Joe Gibbs Racing | Toyota | 312 | 32 |
| 13 | 15 | Clint Bowyer | Michael Waltrip Racing | Toyota | 312 | 32 |
| 14 | 13 | Casey Mears | Germain Racing | Chevrolet | 312 | 30 |
| 15 | 43 | Aric Almirola | Richard Petty Motorsports | Ford | 312 | 29 |
| 16 | 14 | Tony Stewart | Stewart–Haas Racing | Chevrolet | 312 | 28 |
| 17 | 16 | Greg Biffle | Roush Fenway Racing | Ford | 312 | 27 |
| 18 | 17 | Ricky Stenhouse Jr. | Roush Fenway Racing | Ford | 312 | 26 |
| 19 | 11 | Denny Hamlin | Joe Gibbs Racing | Toyota | 312 | 25 |
| 20 | 42 | Kyle Larson (R) | Chip Ganassi Racing | Chevrolet | 312 | 24 |
| 21 | 9 | Marcos Ambrose | Richard Petty Motorsports | Ford | 311 | 23 |
| 22 | 78 | Martin Truex Jr. | Furniture Row Racing | Chevrolet | 311 | 22 |
| 23 | 27 | Paul Menard | Richard Childress Racing | Chevrolet | 311 | 21 |
| 24 | 3 | Austin Dillon (R) | Richard Childress Racing | Chevrolet | 311 | 20 |
| 25 | 55 | Brian Vickers | Michael Waltrip Racing | Toyota | 311 | 19 |
| 26 | 47 | A. J. Allmendinger | JTG Daugherty Racing | Chevrolet | 310 | 18 |
| 27 | 26 | Cole Whitt (R) | Swan Racing | Toyota | 310 | 17 |
| 28 | 34 | David Ragan | Front Row Motorsports | Ford | 310 | 16 |
| 29 | 38 | David Gilliland | Front Row Motorsports | Ford | 309 | 16 |
| 30 | 51 | Justin Allgaier (R) | HScott Motorsports | Chevrolet | 309 | 14 |
| 31 | 36 | Reed Sorenson | Tommy Baldwin Racing | Chevrolet | 308 | 13 |
| 32 | 33 | Brian Scott | Richard Childress Racing | Chevrolet | 308 | 0 |
| 33 | 95 | Michael McDowell | Leavine Family Racing | Ford | 307 | 11 |
| 34 | 7 | Michael Annett (R) | Tommy Baldwin Racing | Chevrolet | 307 | 10 |
| 35 | 83 | Ryan Truex (R) | BK Racing | Toyota | 307 | 9 |
| 36 | 10 | Danica Patrick | Stewart–Haas Racing | Chevrolet | 306 | 8 |
| 37 | 35 | Blake Koch | Front Row Motorsports | Ford | 306 | 0 |
| 38 | 32 | Travis Kvapil | FAS Lane Racing | Ford | 302 | 6 |
| 39 | 41 | Kurt Busch | Stewart–Haas Racing | Chevrolet | 292 | 5 |
| 40 | 66 | Joe Nemechek | Identity Ventures Racing | Toyota | 292 | 0 |
| 41 | 23 | Alex Bowman (R) | BK Racing | Toyota | 230 | 3 |
| 42 | 30 | Parker Kligerman (R) | Swan Racing | Toyota | 226 | 2 |
| 43 | 87 | Morgan Shepherd | Identity Ventures Racing | Toyota | 28 | 0 |
Race Results

=== Race summary ===
- Lead changes: 14 among different drivers
- Cautions/Laps: 8 for 38
- Red flags: 0
- Time of race: 2 hours, 51 minutes and 23 seconds
- Average speed: 109.229 miles per hour (175.787 km/h)

== Media ==
=== Television ===
Fox Sports
| Booth announcers | Pit reporters |
|---|---|
| Lap-by-lap: Mike Joy; Color-commentator: Larry McReynolds; Color commentator: Darrell Waltrip | Matt Yocum; Steve Byrnes; Krista Voda; Jeff Hammond |

=== Radio ===
MRN Radio
| Booth announcers | Turn announcers | Pit reporters |
|---|---|---|
| Lead announcer: Joe Moore; Announcer: Jeff Striegle | Backstretch: Dan Hubbard | Winston Kelly; Steve Post; Alex Hayden; Woody Cain |

== Standings after the race ==
Drivers' Championship standings

| | Pos | Driver | Points |
|---|---|---|---|
| | 1 | Dale Earnhardt Jr. | 90 |
| 1 | 2 | Brad Keselowski | 84 (−6) |
| 1 | 3 | Jeff Gordon | 80 (−10) |
| 8 | 4 | Kevin Harvick | 79 (−11) |
| | 5 | Jimmie Johnson | 78 (−12) |
| 5 | 6 | Joey Logano | 75 (−15) |
| 1 | 7 | Matt Kenseth | 70 (−20) |
| 6 | 8 | Denny Hamlin | 68 (−22) |
| 7 | 9 | Carl Edwards | 65 (−25) |
| 2 | 10 | Greg Biffle | 64 (−26) |
| 1 | 11 | Casey Mears | 64 (−26) |
| 1 | 12 | Jamie McMurray | 64 (−26) |
| 6 | 13 | Ricky Stenhouse Jr. | 63 (−27) |
| 4 | 14 | Kyle Busch | 61 (−29) |
| 6 | 15 | Ryan Newman | 60 (−30) |
| 7 | 16 | Austin Dillon (R) | 56 (−34) |

Manufacturers' Championship standings

| Pos | Manufacturer | Points |
|---|---|---|
| 1 | Chevrolet | 96 |
| 2 | Ford | 84 (−12) |
| 3 | Toyota | 78 (−18) |

- Note: Only the first sixteen positions are included for the driver standings.

== Note ==
| Previous race: 2014 Daytona 500 | Sprint Cup Series; 2014 season | Next race: 2014 Kobalt 400 |
