= 2014 Kobalt 400 =

Race details
- Race 3 of 36 in the 2014 NASCAR Sprint Cup Series
- Date: March 9, 2014
- Location: Las Vegas Motor Speedway in Las Vegas
- Course: Permanent racing facility
- Course length: 1.5 miles (2.4 km)
- Distance: 267 laps, 400.5 mi (644.542 km)
- Average speed: 154.633 mph (248.858 km/h)

Pole position
Driver	Joey Logano	Team Penske
- Time: 27.939

Most laps led
Driver	Brad Keselowski	Team Penske
- Laps: 53

Winner
No. 2	Brad Keselowski	Team Penske

Television in the United States
- Network: Fox & PRN
- Announcers: Mike Joy, Darrell Waltrip and Larry McReynolds (Television); Doug Rice and Mark Garrow (Booth); Rob Albright (1 & 2) and Wendy Venturini (3 & 4) (Turns) (Radio)
- Nielsen ratings: 4.5/9 (Final); 4.2/8 (Overnight); 7.2 Million viewers

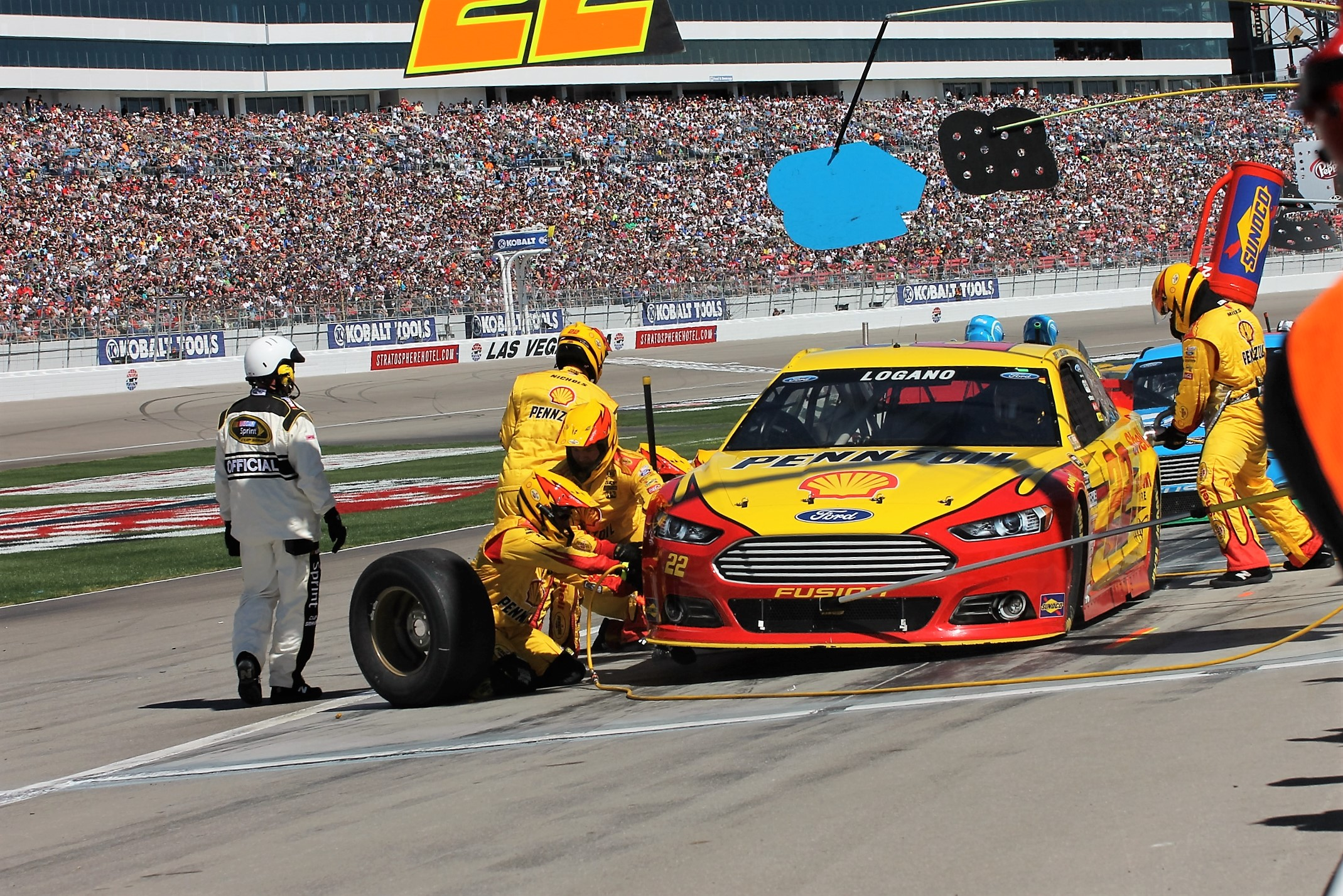
Joey Logano on pit road during the race. Logano would set a new track record during qualifying.

The 2014 Kobalt 400 was a NASCAR Sprint Cup Series stock car race held on March 9, 2014, at Las Vegas Motor Speedway in Las Vegas, Nevada. Contested over 267 laps on the 1.5 miles (2.4 km) asphalt tri-oval, it was the third race of the 2014 NASCAR Sprint Cup Series. Brad Keselowski won the race, his first win of the season, after Dale Earnhardt Jr. ran out of fuel half a lap from the finish. Earnhardt Jr. still finished second, while Paul Menard, Joey Logano, and Carl Edwards rounded out the top five. The top rookies of the race were Austin Dillon (16th), Kyle Larson (19th), and Michael Annett (29th).

== Previous week's race ==
Kevin Harvick held off Dale Earnhardt Jr. in the final nine laps to score victory in The Profit on CNBC 500 at Phoenix International Raceway. Harvick praised his team for the efforts in the early part of the season, since his move from Richard Childress Racing, stating "to add an extra team, bring in a bunch of new guys, new driver, Rodney Childers has just done a phenomenal job of putting this team together. These guys all want to win that is why they came here". He added that he was "really happy" with the engine that had been provided by Hendrick Motorsports. Earnhardt Jr. was disappointed to miss out on the victory, stating that he "would have loved to have won the race, am a little disappointed to have come that close", but like Harvick, praised his team for their performances, adding that they have "a lot of great chemistry and good communication going back and forth. Everybody's confidence is very high. Everybody's mood and morale is really high".

== Report ==
=== Background ===
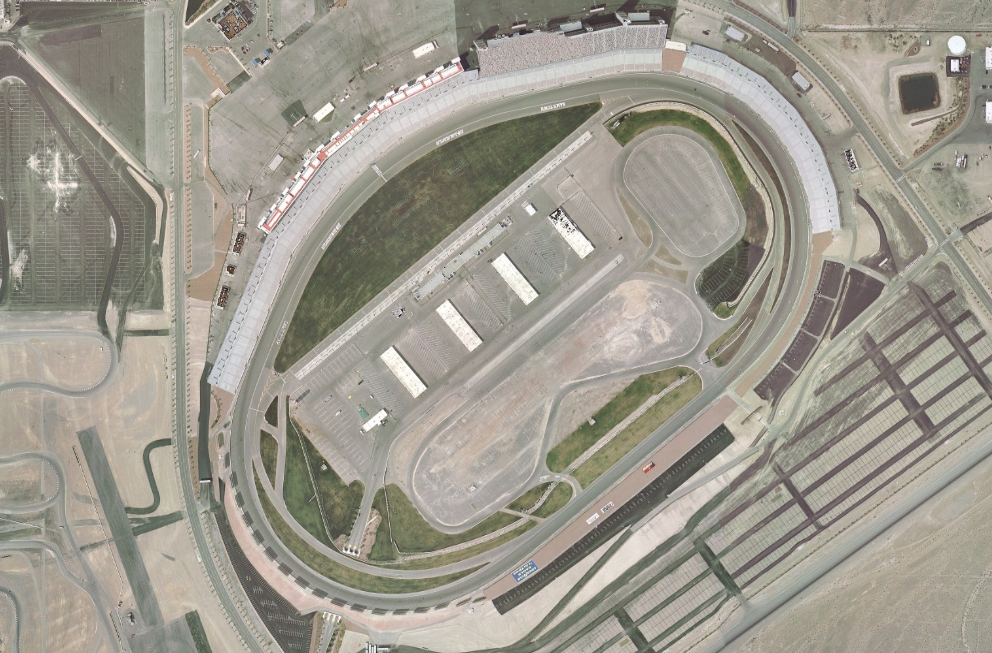
Las Vegas Motor Speedway, the race track where the race was held

The track, Las Vegas Motor Speedway is a four-turn, 1.5 miles (2.4 km) D-shaped oval track that has sanctioned NASCAR Sprint Cup Series events since 1996. After being reconfigured in 2007, the track has a 20° banking in each of the turns, while the rounded front stretch and the back straightaway has a 9° banking. The front stretch, the location of the finish line, is 2,275 feet (693 m) long, 703 feet (214 m) longer than the back straightaway. Las Vegas Motor Speedway also has a grandstand seating capacity of 138,000 people. Matt Kenseth was the defending winner of the race.

=== Entry list ===
The entry list for the Kobalt 400 was released on Thursday, March 6 at 3:08 p.m. Eastern time. Forty-eight cars were entered for the race.

No.	Driver	Team	Manufacturer
1	Jamie McMurray	Chip Ganassi Racing	Chevrolet
2	Brad Keselowski (PC2)	Team Penske	Ford
3	Austin Dillon (R)	Richard Childress Racing	Chevrolet
4	Kevin Harvick	Stewart–Haas Racing	Chevrolet
5	Kasey Kahne	Hendrick Motorsports	Chevrolet
7	Michael Annett (R)	Tommy Baldwin Racing	Chevrolet
9	Marcos Ambrose	Richard Petty Motorsports	Ford
10	Danica Patrick	Stewart–Haas Racing	Chevrolet
11	Denny Hamlin	Joe Gibbs Racing	Toyota
13	Casey Mears	Germain Racing	Chevrolet
14	Tony Stewart (PC3)	Stewart–Haas Racing	Chevrolet
15	Clint Bowyer	Michael Waltrip Racing	Toyota
16	Greg Biffle	Roush-Fenway Racing	Ford
17	Ricky Stenhouse Jr.	Roush-Fenway Racing	Ford
18	Kyle Busch	Joe Gibbs Racing	Toyota
20	Matt Kenseth (PC5)	Joe Gibbs Racing	Toyota
21	Trevor Bayne (i)	Wood Brothers Racing	Ford
22	Joey Logano	Team Penske	Ford
23	Alex Bowman (R)	BK Racing	Toyota
24	Jeff Gordon (PC6)	Hendrick Motorsports	Chevrolet
26	Cole Whitt (R)	Swan Racing	Toyota
27	Paul Menard	Richard Childress Racing	Chevrolet
30	Parker Kligerman (R)	Swan Racing	Toyota
31	Ryan Newman	Richard Childress Racing	Chevrolet
32	Travis Kvapil	Go FAS Racing	Ford
33	Timmy Hill	Circle Sport	Chevrolet
34	David Ragan	Front Row Motorsports	Ford
35	Blake Koch (i)	Front Row Motorsports	Ford
36	Reed Sorenson	Tommy Baldwin Racing	Chevrolet
38	David Gilliland	Front Row Motorsports	Ford
40	Landon Cassill (i)	Circle Sport	Chevrolet
41	Kurt Busch (PC4)	Stewart–Haas Racing	Chevrolet
42	Kyle Larson (R)	Chip Ganassi Racing	Chevrolet
43	Aric Almirola	Richard Petty Motorsports	Ford
44	J. J. Yeley (i)	Team XTREME Racing	Chevrolet
47	A. J. Allmendinger	JTG Daugherty Racing	Chevrolet
48	Jimmie Johnson (PC1)	Hendrick Motorsports	Chevrolet
51	Justin Allgaier (R)	HScott Motorsports	Chevrolet
55	Brian Vickers	Michael Waltrip Racing	Toyota
66	Jeff Burton	Michael Waltrip Racing	Toyota
77	Dave Blaney	Randy Humphrey Racing	Ford
78	Martin Truex Jr.	Furniture Row Racing	Chevrolet
83	Ryan Truex (R)	BK Racing	Toyota
87	Joe Nemechek (i)	NEMCO Motorsports	Toyota
88	Dale Earnhardt Jr.	Hendrick Motorsports	Chevrolet
95	Michael McDowell	Leavine Family Racing	Ford
98	Josh Wise	Phil Parsons Racing	Chevrolet
99	Carl Edwards	Roush-Fenway Racing	Ford
Official entry list

Key	Meaning
(R)	Rookie
(i)	Ineligible for points
(PC#)	Past champions provisional

== Practice ==
=== First practice ===
Carl Edwards was the fastest in the first practice session with a time of 28.128 and a speed of 191.980 mph (308.962 km/h).

Pos	No.	Driver	Team	Manufacturer	Time	Speed
1	99	Carl Edwards	Roush Fenway Racing	Ford	28.128	191.980
2	22	Joey Logano	Team Penske	Ford	28.225	191.320
3	48	Jimmie Johnson	Hendrick Motorsports	Chevrolet	28.252	191.137
Official first practice results

== Qualifying ==
The race was the first to use the three-round knockout format for 1.25 miles (2.00 km) and longer tracks.

- The first round is 25 minutes. Competitors may drive as many laps as they wish, the fastest lap will count.
  - The 24 fastest competitors in the first round advance to the second round.
  - Those finishing in 25th-36th position start based on their speed.
  - Those failing to qualify will have their owner points totals calculated. The six teams with the most owner points (previous year's at this race only) will take 37–42.
  - The most recent former Sprint Cup champion not in the field will then be added, if necessary. If not, the seventh highest team in owner points not in the field will take the 43rd position.
  - Positions 37-43 will be ranked by speed.
- The second round is ten minutes.
  - The 12 fastest competitors advancing to the final round.
  - Those failing to advance will start 13th-24th based on their speed in the second round.
- The final round is five minutes.
  - The fastest driver in this round starts first.
  - Positions 2-12 will be determined by their fastest laps in this round only.

Joey Logano won the pole with a new track record time of 27.939 and a speed of 193.278 mph (311.051 km/h), leading a Team Penske front row ahead of Brad Keselowski. Logano stated that to "have a Penske front row the last two weekends at two completely different race tracks just goes to show how hard these guys have been working", while also stating that the team "obviously haven't won on Sunday yet, so we've got to figure out the big show, but we've had some good speed in our cars". Keselowski added that his car needed "a little bit more in race trim", and that he would "get a better idea and read for that tomorrow when we get back in race trim, but qualifying trim I think we've got our cars really refined well for this package and I'm very proud of where we're at".

The issue of cool down laps came up again since NASCAR does not allow teams to use cool down units. Clint Bowyer stated that he was "not a huge fan of the cool down deal", and hoped NASCAR would look into the situation in regards to the closing speeds on track. Kasey Kahne cut a tire down on his cool down lap. Upon exiting his car, Kahne felt that "NASCAR doesn't have enough people to make a call that we can change it" and that he "sat there and waited and we didn't get to cool our car down". Dave Blaney, Landon Cassill, Blake Koch, Joe Nemechek and J. J. Yeley failed to qualify.

=== Qualifying results ===
Pos	No.	Driver	Team	Manufacturer	R1	R2	R3
1	22	Joey Logano	Team Penske	Ford	28.316	27.993	27.939
2	2	Brad Keselowski	Team Penske	Ford	28.247	28.114	27.965
3	15	Clint Bowyer	Michael Waltrip Racing	Toyota	28.197	28.100	28.021
4	3	Austin Dillon (R)	Richard Childress Racing	Chevrolet	28.190	28.150	28.026
5	48	Jimmie Johnson	Hendrick Motorsports	Chevrolet	28.298	28.159	28.038
6	17	Ricky Stenhouse Jr.	Roush Fenway Racing	Ford	28.301	28.129	28.038
7	1	Jamie McMurray	Chip Ganassi Racing	Chevrolet	28.223	28.102	28.067
8	43	Aric Almirola	Richard Childress Racing	Ford	28.316	28.144	28.076
9	55	Brian Vickers	Michael Waltrip Racing	Toyota	27.980	28.173	28.087
10	31	Ryan Newman	Richard Childress Racing	Chevrolet	28.317	28.162	28.134
11	99	Carl Edwards	Roush Fenway Racing	Ford	28.296	28.149	28.185
12	78	Martin Truex Jr.	Furniture Row Racing	Chevrolet	28.212	28.103	28.197
13	5	Kasey Kahne	Hendrick Motorsports	Chevrolet	28.101	28.175	
14	88	Dale Earnhardt Jr.	Hendrick Motorsports	Chevrolet	28.110	28.181	
15	24	Jeff Gordon	Hendrick Motorsports	Chevrolet	28.241	28.181	
16	4	Kevin Harvick	Stewart–Haas Racing	Chevrolet	28.345	28.184	
17	42	Kyle Larson (R)	Chip Ganassi Racing	Chevrolet	28.310	28.199	
18	47	A. J. Allmendinger	JTG Daugherty Racing	Chevrolet	28.324	28.200	
19	66	Jeff Burton	Identity Ventures Racing	Toyota	28.320	28.208	
20	18	Kyle Busch	Joe Gibbs Racing	Toyota	28.291	28.216	
21	27	Paul Menard	Richard Childress Racing	Chevrolet	28.275	28.282	
22	10	Danica Patrick	Stewart–Haas Racing	Chevrolet	28.258	28.340	
23	41	Kurt Busch	Stewart–Haas Racing	Chevrolet	28.292	28.346	
24	14	Tony Stewart	Stewart–Haas Racing	Chevrolet	28.352	28.494	
25	16	Greg Biffle	Roush Fenway Racing	Ford	28.362		
26	34	David Ragan	Front Row Motorsports	Ford	28.437		
27	11	Denny Hamlin	Joe Gibbs Racing	Toyota	28.456		
28	26	Cole Whitt (R)	Swan Racing	Toyota	28.474		
29	20	Matt Kenseth	Joe Gibbs Racing	Toyota	28.522		
30	13	Casey Mears	Germain Racing	Chevrolet	28.532		
31	98	Josh Wise	Phil Parsons Racing	Chevrolet	28.594		
32	30	Parker Kligerman (R)	Swan Racing	Toyota	28.596		
33	38	David Gilliland	Front Row Motorsports	Ford	28.619		
34	21	Trevor Bayne	Wood Brothers Racing	Ford	28.658		
35	95	Michael McDowell	Leavine Family Racing	Ford	28.682		
36	23	Alex Bowman (R)	BK Racing	Toyota	28.698		
37	51	Justin Allgaier (R)	HScott Motorsports	Chevrolet	28.813		
38	7	Michael Annett (R)	Tommy Baldwin Racing	Chevrolet	28.908		
39	83	Ryan Truex (R)	BK Racing	Toyota	28.991		
40	36	Reed Sorenson	Tommy Baldwin Racing	Chevrolet	29.028		
41	33	Timmy Hill	Circle Sport	Chevrolet	29.115		
42	32	Travis Kvapil	Go FAS Racing	Ford	29.135		
43	9	Marcos Ambrose	Richard Petty Motorsports	Ford	29.922		
Failed to qualify
44	35	Blake Koch	Front Row Motorsports	Ford	28.926		
45	40	Landon Cassill	Hillman-Circle Sport LLC	Chevrolet	29.000		
46	77	Dave Blaney	Randy Humphrey Racing	Ford	29.010		
47	87	Joe Nemechek	Identity Ventures Racing	Toyota	29.537		
48	44	J. J. Yeley	Hillman-Circle Sport LLC	Chevrolet	29.827		
Official qualifying results

== Practice (post-qualifying) ==
=== Second practice ===
Brian Vickers was the fastest in the second practice session with a time of 28.579 and a speed of 188.950 mph (304.086 km/h).

Pos	No.	Driver	Team	Manufacturer	Time	Speed
1	55	Brian Vickers	Michael Waltrip Racing	Toyota	28.579	188.950
2	15	Clint Bowyer	Michael Waltrip Racing	Toyota	28.670	188.350
3	2	Brad Keselowski	Team Penske	Ford	28.727	187.976
Official second practice results

=== Final practice ===
Jamie McMurray was the fastest in the final practice session with a time of 28.886 and a speed of 186.942 mph (300.854 km/h).

Pos	No.	Driver	Team	Manufacturer	Time	Speed
1	1	Jamie McMurray	Chip Ganassi Racing	Chevrolet	28.886	186.942
2	3	Austin Dillon (R)	Richard Childress Racing	Chevrolet	28.893	186.896
3	15	Clint Bowyer	Michael Waltrip Racing	Toyota	28.900	186.851
Official final practice results

== Race ==
=== First half ===
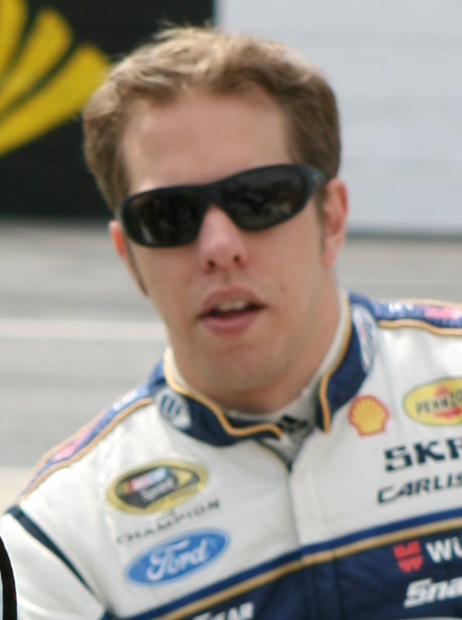
Brad Keselowski won the race.

The race began at 3:20 p.m. when Joey Logano led the field to the green flag. The first caution of the race flew on lap 17 after Josh Wise's engine expired on the backstretch. Brad Keselowski stayed out when the leaders pitted and assumed the lead for the restart on lap 23. Immediately thereafter, Keselowski spun his tires and lost the lead to teammate Logano. Debris in turn 3 brought out the second caution of the race on lap 45. Jimmie Johnson took just two tires, and beat Logano in the race off pit road, and led the field to the restart on lap 50. Kyle Busch took the lead from Johnson on lap 77 and held the lead to the next round of pit stops, on lap 96. Dale Earnhardt Jr. inherited the lead for a lap before he pitted, when the lead returned to Busch. Busch retained the lead to almost half distance, when Kevin Harvick took the lead on lap 130. He held the lead until his next pit stop on lap 140.

=== Second half ===
Busch, Keselowski and Matt Kenseth each had short spells out front before the lead re-cycled to Harvick, on lap 144. Debris on the backstretch brought out the third caution of the race on lap 155. Keselowski stayed out when the others pitted, to retake the lead for the restart on lap 161. With 73 laps to go, Harvick started having engine troubles that took him out of the race; this was the first of five straight races where he was plagued by mechanical trouble. The following lap, Keselowski gave up the lead to pit, when Johnson reclaimed the lead. Paul Menard moved to the front with 68 laps to go, but pitted with 62 laps to go and Johnson assumed the lead. He pitted the next lap to pass the lead to Earnhardt. Denny Hamlin took the lead with 56 laps to go, but pitted the next lap and the lead returned to Keselowski. Debris on the frontstretch brought out the fourth caution with 47 laps to go. Earnhardt Jr. stayed out when the leaders pitted to take the lead for the restart with 42 laps to go.

==== Final lap ====
On the final lap of the race, Earnhardt Jr. ran out of gas exiting turn 2 and Keselowski passed him to take the checkered flag. Keselowski praised his Team Penske organization, stating that they were "just doing everything so well right now", while also stating his pleasure with the victory and the added bonus of being a competitor in the Chase for the Sprint Cup later in the season, stating that he did not "have to hear all that crap all year long about not being in the Chase". Earnhardt Jr. was disappointed with the way that his race finished, describing running out of gas as "tough", while stating that he and his team "have got a good thing going, we've got to be positive. We've got to keep trying to win races. I know my fans are disappointed, but we got to stay positive".

=== Race results ===
Pos	No.	Driver	Team	Manufacturer	Laps	Points
1	2	Brad Keselowski	Team Penske	Ford	267	48
2	88	Dale Earnhardt Jr.	Hendrick Motorsports	Chevrolet	267	43
3	27	Paul Menard	Richard Childress Racing	Chevrolet	267	42
4	22	Joey Logano	Team Penske	Ford	267	41
5	99	Carl Edwards	Roush Fenway Racing	Ford	267	40
6	48	Jimmie Johnson	Hendrick Motorsports	Chevrolet	267	39
7	31	Ryan Newman	Richard Childress Racing	Chevrolet	267	37
8	5	Kasey Kahne	Hendrick Motorsports	Chevrolet	267	36
9	24	Jeff Gordon	Hendrick Motorsports	Chevrolet	267	35
10	20	Matt Kenseth	Joe Gibbs Racing	Toyota	267	35
11	18	Kyle Busch	Joe Gibbs Racing	Toyota	267	34
12	11	Denny Hamlin	Joe Gibbs Racing	Toyota	267	33
13	55	Brian Vickers	Michael Waltrip Racing	Toyota	267	31
14	78	Martin Truex Jr.	Furniture Row Racing	Chevrolet	267	30
15	1	Jamie McMurray	Chip Ganassi Racing	Chevrolet	267	29
16	3	Austin Dillon (R)	Richard Childress Racing	Chevrolet	267	28
17	66	Jeff Burton	Identity Ventures Racing	Toyota	267	27
18	47	A. J. Allmendinger	JTG Daugherty Racing	Chevrolet	267	26
19	42	Kyle Larson (R)	Chip Ganassi Racing	Chevrolet	266	25
20	21	Trevor Bayne	Wood Brothers Racing	Ford	266	0
21	10	Danica Patrick	Stewart–Haas Racing	Chevrolet	266	23
22	16	Greg Biffle	Roush Fenway Racing	Ford	266	22
23	15	Clint Bowyer	Michael Waltrip Racing	Toyota	266	21
24	9	Marcos Ambrose	Richard Petty Motorsports	Ford	264	20
25	43	Aric Almirola	Richard Petty Motorsports	Ford	264	19
26	41	Kurt Busch	Stewart–Haas Racing	Chevrolet	264	18
27	17	Ricky Stenhouse Jr.	Roush Fenway Racing	Ford	264	17
28	13	Casey Mears	Germain Racing	Chevrolet	264	16
29	7	Michael Annett (R)	Tommy Baldwin Racing	Chevrolet	264	15
30	38	David Gilliland	Front Row Motorsports	Ford	264	14
31	51	Justin Allgaier (R)	HScott Motorsports	Chevrolet	264	13
32	34	David Ragan	Front Row Motorsports	Ford	263	12
33	14	Tony Stewart	Stewart–Haas Racing	Chevrolet	263	11
34	36	Reed Sorenson	Tommy Baldwin Racing	Chevrolet	262	10
35	83	Ryan Truex (R)	BK Racing	Toyota	261	9
36	26	Cole Whitt (R)	Swan Racing	Toyota	261	8
37	23	Alex Bowman (R)	BK Racing	Toyota	259	7
38	33	Timmy Hill	Circle Sport	Chevrolet	258	6
39	32	Travis Kvapil	Go FAS Racing	Ford	253	5
40	30	Parker Kligerman (R)	Swan Racing	Toyota	240	4
41	4	Kevin Harvick	Stewart–Haas Racing	Chevrolet	237	4
42	98	Josh Wise	Phil Parsons Racing	Chevrolet	212	2
43	95	Michael McDowell	Leavine Family Racing	Ford	141	1
Race Results

=== Race summary ===
- Lead changes: 21 among different drivers
- Cautions/Laps: 4 for 18
- Red flags: 0
- Time of race: 2 hours, 35 minutes and 24 seconds
- Average speed: 154.633 miles per hour (248.858 km/h)

== Media ==
=== Television ===
Fox Sports
Booth announcers	Pit reporters
Lap-by-lap: Mike Joy; Color-commentator: Larry McReynolds; Color commentator: Darrell Waltrip	Matt Yocum; Steve Byrnes; Krista Voda; Jeff Hammond

=== Radio ===
PRN Radio
Booth announcers	Turn announcers	Pit reporters
Lead announcer: Doug Rice; Announcer: Mark Garrow	Turns 1 & 2: Rob Albright; Turns 3 & 4: Wendy Venturini	Brett McMillan; Steve Richards; Jim Noble; Brad Gillie

== Standings after the race ==
Drivers' Championship standings

	Pos	Driver	Points
	1	Dale Earnhardt Jr.	133
	2	Brad Keselowski	132 (−1)
2	3	Jimmie Johnson	117 (−16)
2	4	Joey Logano	116 (−17)
2	5	Jeff Gordon	115 (−18)
3	6	Carl Edwards	105 (−28)
	7	Matt Kenseth	105 (−28)
	8	Denny Hamlin	101 (−32)
6	9	Ryan Newman	97 (−36)
4	10	Kyle Busch	95 (−38)
1	11	Jamie McMurray	93 (−40)
2	12	Greg Biffle	86 (−47)
3	13	Austin Dillon (R)	84 (−49)
10	14	Kevin Harvick	83 (−50)
3	15	Kasey Kahne	83 (−50)
3	16	Ricky Stenhouse Jr.	80 (−53)

Manufacturers' Championship standings

Pos	Manufacturer	Points
1	Chevrolet	138
2	Ford	132 (−6)
3	Toyota	118 (−20)

- Note: Only the first sixteen positions are included for the driver standings.

Previous race: 2014 The Profit on CNBC 500	Sprint Cup Series; 2014 season	Next race: 2014 Food City 500
