= 2014 Food City 500 =

Race details
- Race 4 of 36 in the 2014 NASCAR Sprint Cup Series
- The 2014 Food City 500 program cover, featuring Rusty Wallace and Brad Keselowski.
- Date: March 16, 2014
- Location: Bristol Motor Speedway in Bristol, Tennessee
- Course: Permanent racing facility
- Course length: 0.533 miles (0.858 km)
- Distance: 503 laps, 268.099 mi (431.464 km)
- Scheduled distance: 500 laps, 266.5 mi (428.890 km)
- Weather: Partly cloudy with chances of rain and a temperature of 47 °F (8 °C); wind out of the southeast at 13 mph (21 km/h)
- Average speed: 84.051 mph (135.267 km/h)

Pole position
Driver	Denny Hamlin	Joe Gibbs Racing
- Time: 14.761 seconds

Most laps led
Driver	Matt Kenseth	Joe Gibbs Racing
- Laps: 165

Winner
No. 99	Carl Edwards	Roush Fenway Racing

Television in the United States
- Network: Fox & PRN
- Announcers: Mike Joy, Darrell Waltrip and Larry McReynolds (Television); Doug Rice and Mark Garrow (Booth); Rob Albright (Backstretch) (Radio)
- Nielsen ratings: 4.5/9 (Final); 4.2/8 (Overnight); 7.3 Million viewers

The 2014 Food City 500 was a NASCAR Sprint Cup Series stock car race held on March 16, 2014, at Bristol Motor Speedway in Bristol, Tennessee. Contested over 503 laps – having been extended from the original distance of 500 laps in the prospect of a green–white–checker finish that ultimately did not occur due to weather – on the 0.533 miles (0.858 km) concrete oval, it was the fourth race of the 2014 NASCAR Sprint Cup Series season. Carl Edwards won the race, his first of the season, while teammate Ricky Stenhouse Jr. finished second, while Aric Almirola, Tony Stewart, and Marcos Ambrose rounded out the top five. The top rookies of the race were Kyle Larson (10th), Austin Dillon (11th), and Justin Allgaier (17th).

== Previous week's race ==
On the final lap of the Kobalt 400 at Las Vegas Motor Speedway, Dale Earnhardt Jr. ran out of gas exiting turn 2 and Brad Keselowski passed him to take the checkered flag. Keselowski praised his Team Penske organization, stating that they were "just doing everything so well right now", while also stating his pleasure with the victory and the added bonus of being a competitor in the Chase for the Sprint Cup later in the season, stating that he did not "have to hear all that crap all year long about not being in the Chase". Earnhardt Jr. was disappointed with the way that his race finished, describing running out of gas as "tough", while stating that he and his team "have got a good thing going, we've got to be positive. We've got to keep trying to win races. I know my fans are disappointed, but we got to stay positive".

== Report ==
=== Background ===
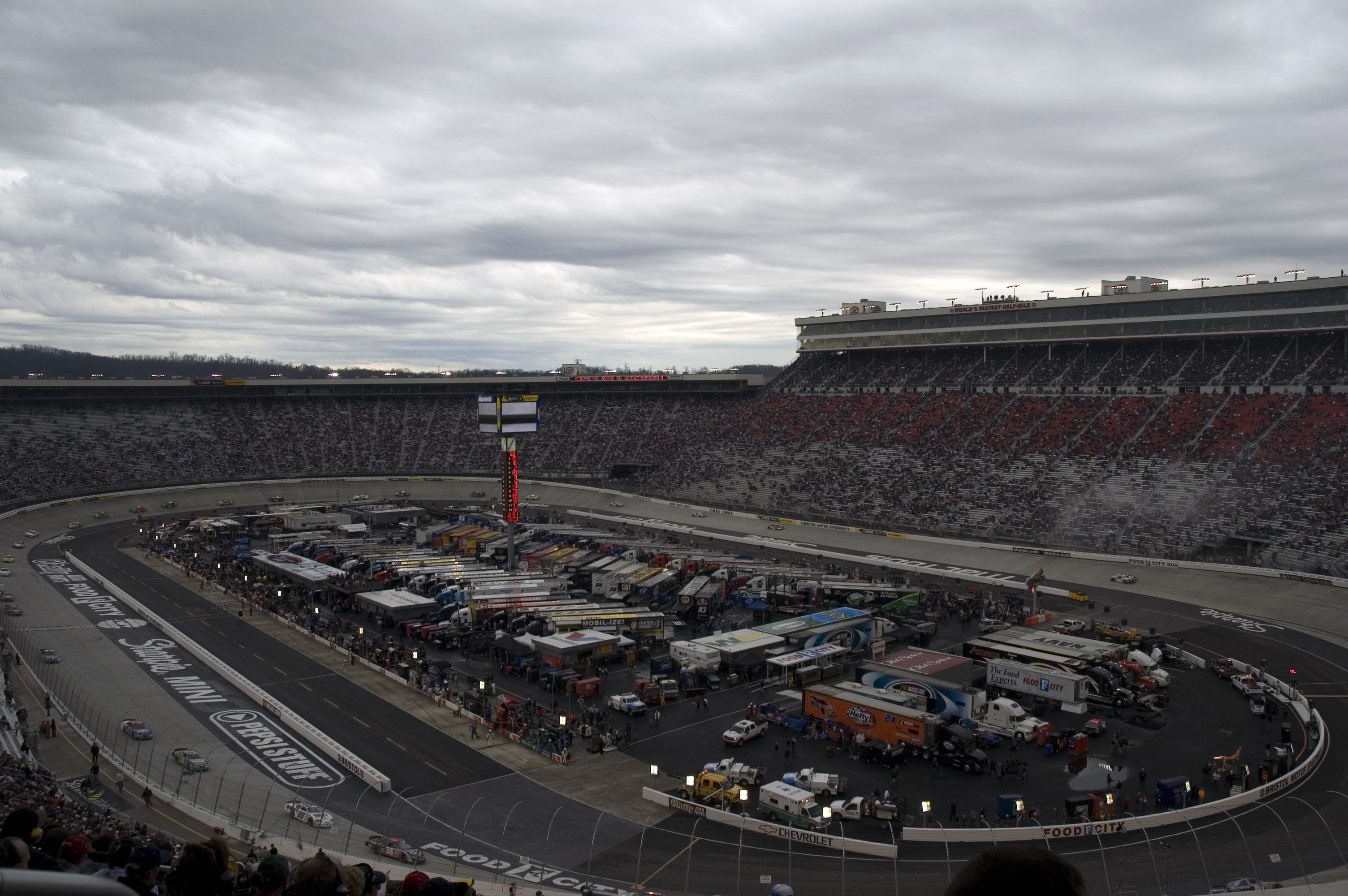
Bristol Motor Speedway, the track where the race was held.

The track, Bristol Motor Speedway, is a four-turn short track oval that is 0.533 miles (0.858 km) long. The track's turns are banked from twenty-four to thirty degrees, while the front stretch, the location of the finish line, is banked from six to ten degrees. The back stretch also has banking from six to ten degrees. The track has a seating capacity of 160,000 people. The race consisted of 500 laps, equivalent to a race distance of 266.5 miles (428.9 km). The 2013 winner was Kasey Kahne.

=== Entry list ===
The entry list for the Food City 500 was released Monday, March 10 at 10:24 a.m. Eastern time. Forty-five drivers were entered for the race.

No.	Driver	Team	Manufacturer
1	Jamie McMurray	Chip Ganassi Racing	Chevrolet
2	Brad Keselowski (PC2)	Team Penske	Ford
3	Austin Dillon (R)	Richard Childress Racing	Chevrolet
4	Kevin Harvick	Stewart–Haas Racing	Chevrolet
5	Kasey Kahne	Hendrick Motorsports	Chevrolet
7	Michael Annett (R)	Tommy Baldwin Racing	Chevrolet
9	Marcos Ambrose	Richard Petty Motorsports	Ford
10	Danica Patrick	Stewart–Haas Racing	Chevrolet
11	Denny Hamlin	Joe Gibbs Racing	Toyota
13	Casey Mears	Germain Racing	Chevrolet
14	Tony Stewart (PC3)	Stewart–Haas Racing	Chevrolet
15	Clint Bowyer	Michael Waltrip Racing	Toyota
16	Greg Biffle	Roush-Fenway Racing	Ford
17	Ricky Stenhouse Jr.	Roush-Fenway Racing	Ford
18	Kyle Busch	Joe Gibbs Racing	Toyota
20	Matt Kenseth (PC5)	Joe Gibbs Racing	Toyota
22	Joey Logano	Team Penske	Ford
23	Alex Bowman (R)	BK Racing	Toyota
24	Jeff Gordon (PC6)	Hendrick Motorsports	Chevrolet
26	Cole Whitt (R)	Swan Racing	Toyota
27	Paul Menard	Richard Childress Racing	Chevrolet
30	Parker Kligerman (R)	Swan Racing	Toyota
31	Ryan Newman	Richard Childress Racing	Chevrolet
32	Travis Kvapil	Go FAS Racing	Ford
33	Timmy Hill	Circle Sport	Chevrolet
34	David Ragan	Front Row Motorsports	Ford
35	David Reutimann	Front Row Motorsports	Ford
36	Reed Sorenson	Tommy Baldwin Racing	Chevrolet
38	David Gilliland	Front Row Motorsports	Ford
40	Landon Cassill (i)	Circle Sport	Chevrolet
41	Kurt Busch (PC4)	Stewart–Haas Racing	Chevrolet
42	Kyle Larson (R)	Chip Ganassi Racing	Chevrolet
43	Aric Almirola	Richard Petty Motorsports	Ford
47	A. J. Allmendinger	JTG Daugherty Racing	Chevrolet
48	Jimmie Johnson (PC1)	Hendrick Motorsports	Chevrolet
51	Justin Allgaier (R)	HScott Motorsports	Chevrolet
55	Brian Vickers	Michael Waltrip Racing	Toyota
66	Joe Nemechek (i)	Michael Waltrip Racing	Toyota
77	Dave Blaney	Randy Humphrey Racing	Ford
78	Martin Truex Jr.	Furniture Row Racing	Chevrolet
83	Ryan Truex (R)	BK Racing	Toyota
88	Dale Earnhardt Jr.	Hendrick Motorsports	Chevrolet
95	Michael McDowell	Leavine Family Racing	Ford
98	Josh Wise	Phil Parsons Racing	Chevrolet
99	Carl Edwards	Roush-Fenway Racing	Ford
Official entry list

Key	Meaning
(R)	Rookie
(i)	Ineligible for points
(PC#)	Past champions provisional

== Practice ==
=== First practice ===
Kurt Busch was the fastest in the first practice session with a time of 14.784 and a speed of 129.789 mph (208.875 km/h). His younger brother Kyle Busch was among four drivers who wrecked their primary cars during the session. Danica Patrick slid, hit the wall in turn 4, ricocheted into Parker Kligerman and sent him into the wall. Kyle Busch and Greg Biffle were involved in a similar situation in the same session, while Justin Allgaier bounced off the turn 1 wall, having believed he had blown a right-front tire.

Pos	No.	Driver	Team	Manufacturer	Time	Speed
1	41	Kurt Busch	Stewart–Haas Racing	Chevrolet	14.784	129.789
2	24	Jeff Gordon	Hendrick Motorsports	Chevrolet	14.826	129.421
3	11	Denny Hamlin	Joe Gibbs Racing	Toyota	14.834	129.351
Official first practice results

== Qualifying ==
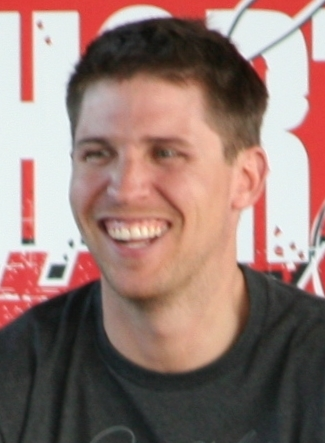
Denny Hamlin won the pole position, setting a new track record.

Denny Hamlin won the pole – the 18th of his Cup career – with a new track record time of 14.761 and a speed of 129.991 mph (209.200 km/h). Hamlin stated that his lap was "faster than I ever imagined going around this track" and that "every new rule change we have just makes these cars go a little bit faster". Brad Keselowski joined Hamlin on the front row, missing out on pole by 0.003 seconds. He started that "if you're fast, you're fast and it shows through", while also praising Hamlin's car as "fast". Championship leader Dale Earnhardt Jr. could only qualify 14th, stating that he was "just too tight" on his opening run in qualifying, and that he also "kind of overshot the track a little bit".

=== Qualifying results ===
Pos	No.	Driver	Team	Manufacturer	R1	R2
1	11	Denny Hamlin	Joe Gibbs Racing	Toyota	14.850	14.761
2	2	Brad Keselowski	Team Penske	Ford	14.908	14.764
3	20	Matt Kenseth	Joe Gibbs Racing	Toyota	14.952	14.866
4	22	Joey Logano	Team Penske	Ford	14.832	14.894
5	9	Marcos Ambrose	Richard Petty Motorsports	Ford	14.936	14.906
6	24	Jeff Gordon	Hendrick Motorsports	Chevrolet	14.842	14.962
7	18	Kyle Busch	Joe Gibbs Racing	Toyota	14.880	14.972
8	16	Greg Biffle	Roush Fenway Racing	Ford	14.932	14.997
9	31	Ryan Newman	Richard Childress Racing	Chevrolet	14.864	15.014
10	5	Kasey Kahne	Hendrick Motorsports	Chevrolet	14.941	15.027
11	48	Jimmie Johnson	Hendrick Motorsports	Chevrolet	14.892	15.063
12	99	Carl Edwards	Roush Fenway Racing	Ford	14.867	15.100
13	41	Kurt Busch	Stewart–Haas Racing	Chevrolet	14.953	—
14	88	Dale Earnhardt Jr.	Hendrick Motorsports	Chevrolet	14.959	—
15	15	Clint Bowyer	Michael Waltrip Racing	Toyota	14.962	—
16	38	David Gilliland	Front Row Motorsports	Ford	14.963	—
17	1	Jamie McMurray	Chip Ganassi Racing	Chevrolet	14.971	—
18	26	Cole Whitt (R)	Swan Racing	Toyota	14.999	—
19	34	David Ragan	Front Row Motorsports	Ford	15.002	—
20	42	Kyle Larson (R)	Chip Ganassi Racing	Chevrolet	15.015	—
21	17	Ricky Stenhouse Jr.	Roush Fenway Racing	Ford	15.028	—
22	47	A. J. Allmendinger	JTG Daugherty Racing	Chevrolet	15.032	—
23	43	Aric Almirola	Richard Petty Motorsports	Ford	15.037	—
24	95	Michael McDowell	Leavine Family Racing	Ford	15.037	—
25	13	Casey Mears	Germain Racing	Chevrolet	15.038	—
26	3	Austin Dillon (R)	Richard Childress Racing	Chevrolet	15.046	—
27	4	Kevin Harvick	Stewart–Haas Racing	Chevrolet	15.056	—
28	27	Paul Menard (Note: Paul Menard and Parker Kligerman started from the rear, after unscheduled engine changes.)	Richard Childress Racing	Chevrolet	15.057	—
29	78	Martin Truex Jr.	Furniture Row Racing	Chevrolet	15.067	—
30	51	Justin Allgaier (R)	HScott Motorsports	Chevrolet	15.068	—
31	40	Landon Cassill (Note: Landon Cassill started from the rear for switching to a backup car post-qualifying.)	Hillman-Circle Sport LLC	Chevrolet	15.087	—
32	98	Josh Wise	Phil Parsons Racing	Chevrolet	15.088	—
33	23	Alex Bowman (R)	BK Racing	Toyota	15.089	—
34	7	Michael Annett (R)	Tommy Baldwin Racing	Chevrolet	15.121	—
35	36	Reed Sorenson	Tommy Baldwin Racing	Chevrolet	15.151	—
36	10	Danica Patrick	Stewart–Haas Racing	Chevrolet	15.153	—
37	14	Tony Stewart	Stewart–Haas Racing	Chevrolet	15.163	—
38	55	Brian Vickers	Michael Waltrip Racing	Toyota	15.175	—
39	32	Travis Kvapil	Go FAS Racing	Ford	15.192	—
40	83	Ryan Truex (R)	BK Racing	Toyota	15.306	—
41	30	Parker Kligerman (R)	Swan Racing	Toyota	15.417	—
42	66	Joe Nemechek	Michael Waltrip Racing	Toyota	15.659	—
43	33	Timmy Hill	Hillman-Circle Sport LLC	Chevrolet	15.717	—
Did not qualify
44	35	David Reutimann	Front Row Motorsports	Ford	15.154	—
45	77	Dave Blaney	Randy Humphrey Racing	Ford	15.330	—
Official qualifying results

== Practice (post-qualifying) ==
Ryan Newman was the fastest in the second practice session with a time of 15.099 and a speed of 127.081 mph (204.517 km/h).

Pos	No.	Driver	Team	Manufacturer	Time	Speed
1	31	Ryan Newman	Richard Childress Racing	Chevrolet	15.099	127.081
2	4	Kevin Harvick	Stewart–Haas Racing	Chevrolet	15.125	126.863
3	41	Kurt Busch	Stewart–Haas Racing	Chevrolet	15.146	126.687
Official second practice results

=== Final practice ===
Casey Mears was the fastest in the final practice session with a time of 15.240 and a speed of 125.906 mph (202.626 km/h). Landon Cassill broke the rear-end housing and hit the wall hard during the session. He was forced to roll out his backup car and started from the rear because the change took place after qualifying.

Pos	No.	Driver	Team	Manufacturer	Time	Speed
1	13	Casey Mears	Germain Racing	Chevrolet	15.240	125.906
2	20	Matt Kenseth	Joe Gibbs Racing	Toyota	15.251	125.815
3	99	Carl Edwards	Roush Fenway Racing	Ford	15.267	125.683
Official final practice results

== Race ==
=== First half ===
==== Start ====
The race was scheduled to start at 1:13 p.m. Eastern time, but was delayed for almost two hours by heavy rain. The race finally got underway at 3:00 p.m. when Denny Hamlin led the field to the green flag. Brad Keselowski took the lead on lap two, and it did not take long before he started lapping cars in typical Bristol fashion. Joey Logano used a lapped car as a pick to get ahead of Keselowski for the lead on lap 42, shortly prior to a scheduled competition caution on lap 51 due to the earlier showers. Jimmie Johnson took just two tires and exited pit road as the leader. His teammate Jeff Gordon was exiting his stall when David Ragan was coming into his; Ragan came down across Gordon and got turned around. The race restarted on lap 58, before another caution on lap 60, due to debris in turn 2.

==== Rain delay ====
The race restarted on lap 65 and Parker Kligerman got loose and turned sideways in turn 3 bringing out the third caution of the race. He apparently ran over a battery pack that came off a car well in front of him, while his hood pins were carrying what appeared to be toilet paper. Alex Bowman stalled on the apron in turn 1 and needed a push from one of the safety trucks to get back to pit road. It was discovered that the battery pack on the track belonged to his car. The race restarted on lap 76 with Johnson still out front. He remained at the head of proceedings until lap 98, when Matt Kenseth took the lead. The right-front tire on Johnson's car started coming apart on lap 114. Unlike other short tracks Martinsville and Richmond, the right-side tires run with an inner-liner at Bristol, to prevent spinning after a tire blowout, and allowing the car to get to pit road to change the tire. As the incident occurred in green flag conditions, Johnson lost several laps. He was somewhat saved by the fourth caution of the race on lap 118 when the rain returned. Joey Logano was the first car one lap down, but pitted several times due to a power steering issue and lost three laps under that caution. Kenseth and Kurt Busch traded the lead on pit road, but Kenseth led off pit road and retook the lead. The rain started off as a light drizzle, but then intensified and the race was red flagged on lap 125. The track was dried enough that the drivers were called back to their cars after an hour and eleven minutes. Unfortunately, the rain picked up again and delayed the race for another hour and 45 minutes.

==== Restart ====
After the second delay, the cars started rolling back onto the track. The race restarted on lap 137, and Kurt Busch took the lead on lap 153. The fifth caution of the race flew on lap 156 when Cole Whitt came across the nose of Danica Patrick and got turned into the wall on the front stretch. Whitt's car slid down the surface in turn 1 right in front of the leaders. Timmy Hill slammed into the back of Kenseth, while trying to slow down. The race restarted on lap 167, with Jamie McMurray and Kurt Busch swapping the lead over the next three laps, before McMurray held the lead to a second competition caution, on lap 187, due to the rain delay. Clint Bowyer stayed out when the leaders pitted and he assumed the lead, while Kyle Busch won the race off pit road.

=== Second half ===
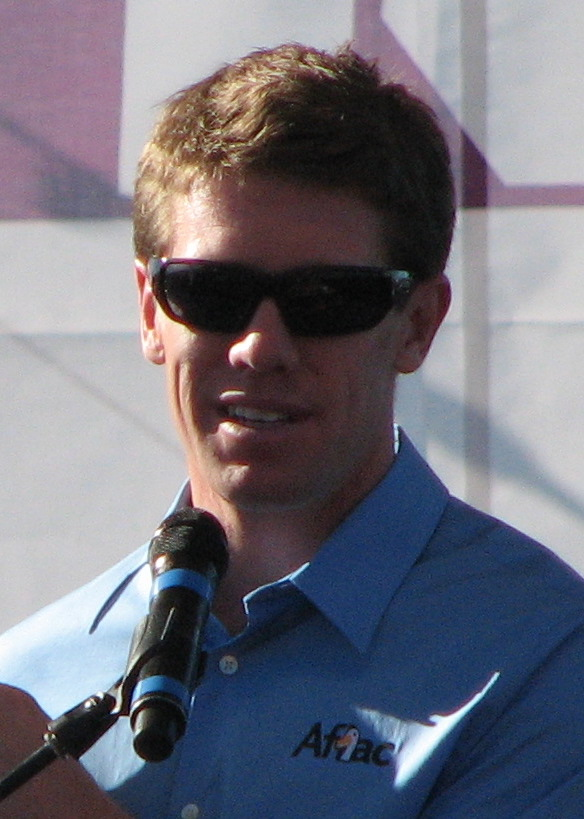
Carl Edwards won the race.

The race restarted on lap 193, and Kyle Busch took the lead from Bowyer, on lap 195. He held the lead for the next stint of the race, until Kasey Kahne took the lead on lap 268. Two laps later, Kyle Busch made an unscheduled stop after making contact with Dale Earnhardt Jr. which he felt had caused a flat tire. The seventh caution of the race flew on lap 276 after Ryan Truex hit the wall in turn 2, after a right-front tire blowout. Kahne swapped the lead with Hamlin on pit road, but Kahne exited pit road as the leader. The race restarted on lap 285 and Kahne lost the lead to Matt Kenseth. Kenseth maintained the lead throughout the next stint, before the eighth caution of the race flew on lap 332 after Michael McDowell turned David Ragan exiting turn 4. Kenseth traded the lead with Hamlin on pit road, but left pit road as the leader.

The race restarted on lap 339, and like the previous stint, Kenseth led throughout until the next caution flag – the ninth of the race – flew on lap 394 after Kyle Busch had a left-side tire go flat and spun out in turn 4, and was just clipped by his brother Kurt, which caused a similar puncture on his car. Travis Kvapil also hit the wall trying to avoid Kyle Busch. Once again, Kenseth and Hamlin traded the lead on pit road, but on this occasion, it was Kevin Harvick who would exit as the leader for the restart with 97 laps to go. The tenth caution of the race flew with 78 laps to go after Martin Truex Jr. cut down his left-rear tire, spun through 360 degrees and came to a stop at the exit of turn 2. Carl Edwards chose not to pit and assumed the lead for the restart with 71 laps to go. The eleventh caution of the race flew with 50 laps to go after Harvick had a broken gear that sent his car into the wall hard in turn 1. Keselowski hit the back of McMurray as both were trying to avoid hitting Harvick.

==== Final laps ====
===== Caution out of nowhere =====
The race restarted with 39 laps to go, with Edwards still at the head of the race, and remained so until the twelfth caution of the race flew with two laps to go after the manual override switch in the flag stand was activated, which turned on the caution lights. NASCAR vice-president of competition Robin Pemberton stated after the race that the organization "were scanning cars and spotters, and there's some of us in the tower that only heard it after the teams were talking about it because we were looking at other things around the racetrack". He added that the situation was where NASCAR “learn a lot of lessons, and when we learn a lesson like this we'll go in and further investigate some things" and that "there's probably some things that we needed to do to better secure that area where the manual override is on the lights".

====== Finish ======
Just as the field was being lined up to restart the race, rain started to fall once again. After 503 laps, a two-hour delay to start the race, a three-hour delay at the quarter mark and multiple rain showers, NASCAR called the end of the race and Carl Edwards took the victory at Bristol Motor Speedway. Edwards described his race as "awesome", after troubles on the previous day, stating that his car was "terrible on Saturday, so I'm just glad we turned it around". Ricky Stenhouse Jr. scored his best career finish with a runner up spot, stating that he had "a lot of fun" and that his team was "just slowly working and getting better and better", as he continued to improve results in his second full season in the Sprint Cup Series. Aric Almirola also scored his best career finish, at the time of the race, in third place.

=== Race results ===
Pos	No.	Driver	Team	Manufacturer	Laps	Points
1	99	Carl Edwards	Roush Fenway Racing	Ford	503	47
2	17	Ricky Stenhouse Jr.	Roush Fenway Racing	Ford	503	42
3	43	Aric Almirola	Richard Petty Motorsports	Ford	503	41
4	14	Tony Stewart	Stewart–Haas Racing	Chevrolet	503	40
5	9	Marcos Ambrose	Richard Petty Motorsports	Ford	503	39
6	11	Denny Hamlin	Joe Gibbs Racing	Toyota	503	39
7	24	Jeff Gordon	Hendrick Motorsports	Chevrolet	503	37
8	5	Kasey Kahne	Hendrick Motorsports	Chevrolet	503	37
9	55	Brian Vickers	Michael Waltrip Racing	Toyota	503	35
10	42	Kyle Larson (R)	Chip Ganassi Racing	Chevrolet	503	34
11	3	Austin Dillon (R)	Richard Childress Racing	Chevrolet	503	33
12	16	Greg Biffle	Roush Fenway Racing	Ford	503	32
13	20	Matt Kenseth	Joe Gibbs Racing	Toyota	503	33
14	2	Brad Keselowski	Team Penske	Ford	503	31
15	15	Clint Bowyer	Michael Waltrip Racing	Toyota	503	30
16	31	Ryan Newman	Richard Childress Racing	Chevrolet	503	28
17	51	Justin Allgaier (R)	HScott Motorsports	Chevrolet	502	27
18	10	Danica Patrick	Stewart–Haas Racing	Chevrolet	502	26
19	48	Jimmie Johnson	Hendrick Motorsports	Chevrolet	501	26
20	22	Joey Logano	Team Penske	Ford	500	25
21	27	Paul Menard	Richard Childress Racing	Chevrolet	500	23
22	38	David Gilliland	Front Row Motorsports	Ford	500	22
23	98	Josh Wise	Phil Parsons Racing	Chevrolet	499	21
24	88	Dale Earnhardt Jr.	Hendrick Motorsports	Chevrolet	499	20
25	47	A. J. Allmendinger	JTG Daugherty Racing	Chevrolet	498	19
26	7	Michael Annett (R)	Tommy Baldwin Racing	Chevrolet	497	18
27	13	Casey Mears	Germain Racing	Chevrolet	497	17
28	36	Reed Sorenson	Tommy Baldwin Racing	Chevrolet	497	16
29	18	Kyle Busch	Joe Gibbs Racing	Toyota	496	16
30	40	Landon Cassill	Hillman–Circle Sport LLC	Chevrolet	496	0
31	34	David Ragan	Front Row Motorsports	Ford	495	13
32	23	Alex Bowman (R)	BK Racing	Toyota	493	12
33	32	Travis Kvapil	Go FAS Racing	Ford	491	11
34	30	Parker Kligerman (R)	Swan Racing	Toyota	487	10
35	41	Kurt Busch	Stewart–Haas Racing	Chevrolet	473	10
36	78	Martin Truex Jr.	Furniture Row Racing	Chevrolet	471	8
37	95	Michael McDowell	Leavine Family Racing	Ford	469	7
38	1	Jamie McMurray	Chip Ganassi Racing	Chevrolet	453	7
39	4	Kevin Harvick	Stewart–Haas Racing	Chevrolet	450	6
40	26	Cole Whitt (R)	Swan Racing	Toyota	430	4
41	66	Joe Nemechek	Identity Ventures Racing	Toyota	322	0
42	83	Ryan Truex (R)	BK Racing	Toyota	271	2
43	33	Timmy Hill	Hillman–Circle Sport LLC	Chevrolet	160	1
Race Results

=== Race statistics ===
- Lead changes: 20 among different drivers
- Cautions/Laps: 12 for 95
- Red flags: 1 for 3 hours, 19 minutes and 0 seconds
- Time of race: 3 hours, 11 minutes and 23 seconds
- Average speed: 84.051 miles per hour (135.267 km/h)

== Media ==
=== Television ===
Fox Sports
Booth announcers	Pit reporters
Lap-by-lap: Mike Joy; Color-commentator: Larry McReynolds; Color commentator: Darrell Waltrip	Matt Yocum; Steve Byrnes; Krista Voda; Jeff Hammond

=== Radio ===
PRN Radio
Booth announcers	Turn announcers	Pit reporters
Lead announcer: Doug Rice; Announcer: Mark Garrow	Backstretch: Rob Albright	Brett McMillan; Steve Richards; Jim Noble; Wendy Venturini

== Standings after the race ==
Drivers' Championship standings

	Pos	Driver	Points
1	1	Brad Keselowski	163
1	2	Dale Earnhardt Jr.	153 (−10)
3	3	Carl Edwards	152 (−11)
1	4	Jeff Gordon	152 (−11)
2	5	Jimmie Johnson	143 (−20)
2	6	Joey Logano	141 (−22)
1	7	Denny Hamlin	140 (−23)
1	8	Matt Kenseth	138 (−25)
	9	Ryan Newman	125 (−38)
6	10	Ricky Stenhouse Jr.	122 (−41)
4	11	Kasey Kahne	120 (−43)
	12	Greg Biffle	118 (−45)
	13	Austin Dillon (R)	117 (−46)
4	14	Kyle Busch	111 (−52)
4	15	Marcos Ambrose	108 (−55)
5	16	Jamie McMurray	100 (−63)

Manufacturers' Championship standings

	Pos	Manufacturer	Points
1	1	Ford	179
1	2	Chevrolet	179 (−0)
	3	Toyota	152 (−27)

- Note: Only the first sixteen positions are included for the driver standings.

== Notes ==
Previous race: 2014 Kobalt 400	Sprint Cup Series; 2014 season	Next race: 2014 Auto Club 400
