= 2014 Auto Club 400 =

Race details
- Race 5 of 36 in the 2014 NASCAR Sprint Cup Series
- Track map of the speedway at Auto Club Speedway AKA California Speedway
- Date: March 23, 2014
- Location: Auto Club Speedway, Fontana, California
- Course: Permanent racing facility
- Course length: 2.000 miles (3.219 km)
- Distance: 206 laps, 412 mi (663.050 km)
- Scheduled distance: 200 laps, 400 mi (643.738 km)
- Weather: Clear with a temperature around 73 °F (23 °C); wind out of the SW at 9 miles per hour (14 km/h).
- Average speed: 132.987 mph (214.022 km/h)

Pole position
Driver	Matt Kenseth	Joe Gibbs Racing
- Time: 38.438 seconds

Most laps led
Driver	Jimmie Johnson	Hendrick Motorsports
- Laps: 104

Winner
No. 18	Kyle Busch	Joe Gibbs Racing

Television in the United States
- Network: Fox & MRN
- Announcers: Mike Joy, Darrell Waltrip and Larry McReynolds (Television); Joe Moore and Jeff Striegle (Booth); Dave Moody (1 & 2) and Dan Hubbard (3 & 4) (Turns) (Radio)
- Nielsen ratings: 4.4/10 (Final); 4.2/9 (Overnight); 7.1 Million viewers

The 2014 Auto Club 400 was a NASCAR Sprint Cup Series stock car race that was held on March 23, 2014, at Auto Club Speedway in Fontana, California. Contested over 206 laps on the 2 miles (3.2 km) asphalt D-shaped oval – extended from 200 laps due to a green–white–checker finish – it was the fifth race of the 2014 NASCAR Sprint Cup Series. Kyle Busch won the race, his first win of the season, while Kyle Larson finished as the highest rookie in second, while Kurt Busch, Matt Kenseth, and Tony Stewart rounded out the top five. Behind Larson, the top rookies in the race were Austin Dillon in 11th, and Cole Whitt in 18th.

== Previous week's race ==
Just as the field was being lined up to restart the Food City 500, rain started to fall once again. After 503 laps, a two-hour delay to start the race, a three-hour delay at the quarter mark and multiple rain showers, NASCAR called the end of the race and Carl Edwards took the victory at Bristol Motor Speedway. Edwards described his race as "awesome", after troubles on the previous day, stating that his car was "terrible on Saturday, so I'm just glad we turned it around". Ricky Stenhouse Jr. scored his best career finish with a runner up spot, stating that he had "a lot of fun" and that his team was "just slowly working and getting better and better", as he continued to improve results in his first full season in the Sprint Cup. Aric Almirola also scored his best career finish, at the time of the race, in third place.

== Report ==
=== Background ===
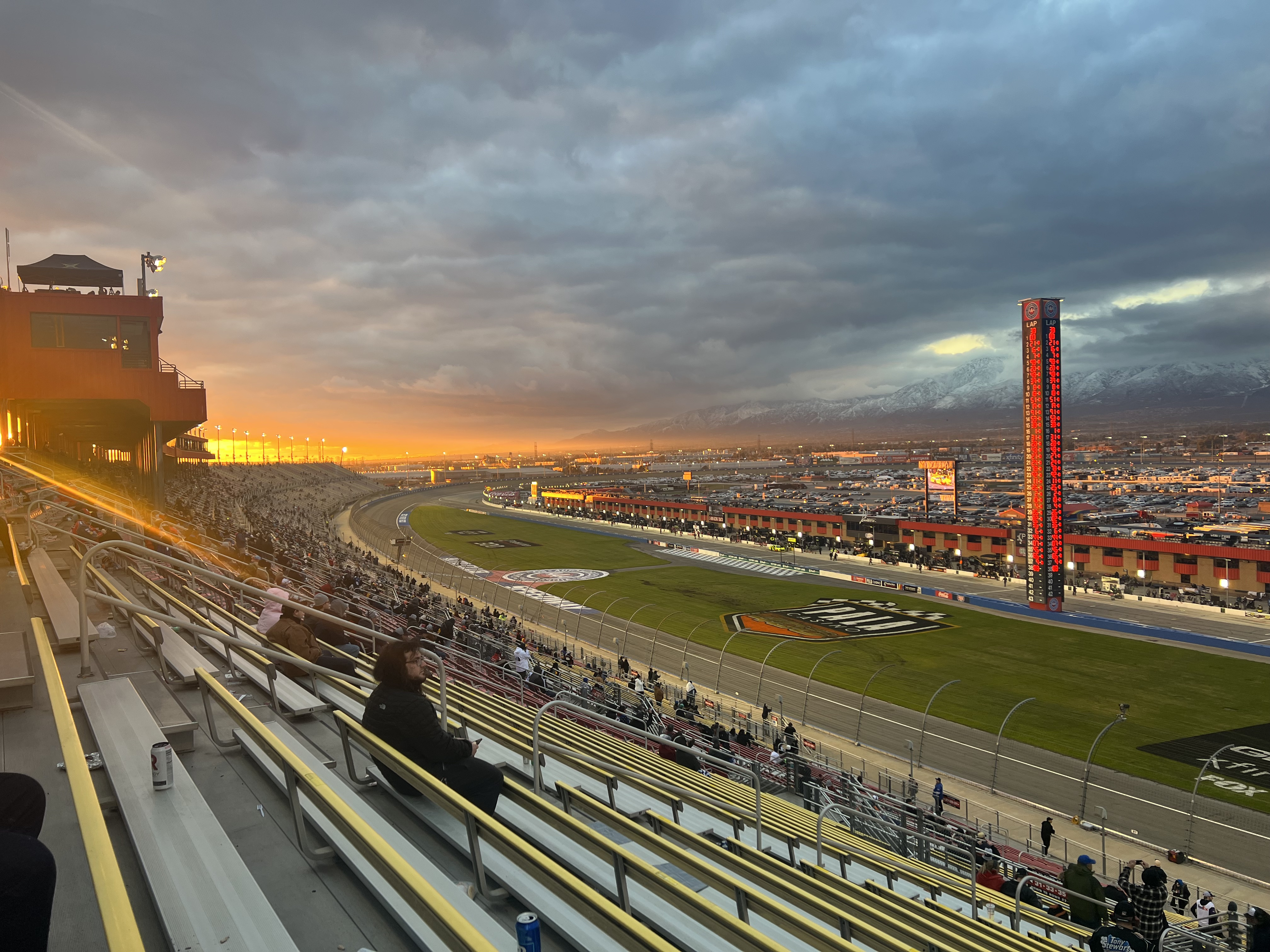
Auto Club Speedway, the race track where the race was held.

The track, Auto Club Speedway, was a four-turn superspeedway that was 2 miles (3.2 km) long. The track's turns were banked from fourteen degrees, while the front stretch, the location of the finish line, was banked at eleven degrees. Unlike the front stretch, the backstraightaway was banked at three degrees. The track had a seating capacity of 92,100 people. The race consisted of 200 laps, equivalent to a race distance of 400 miles (640 km). The defending race winner was Kyle Busch.

=== Entry list ===
The entry list for the Auto Club 400 was released on Tuesday, March 18 at 1:49 p.m. Eastern time. Forty-three cars were entered for the race which meant no one would fail to qualify.

No.	Driver	Team	Manufacturer
1	Jamie McMurray	Chip Ganassi Racing	Chevrolet
2	Brad Keselowski (PC2)	Team Penske	Ford
3	Austin Dillon (R)	Richard Childress Racing	Chevrolet
4	Kevin Harvick	Stewart–Haas Racing	Chevrolet
5	Kasey Kahne	Hendrick Motorsports	Chevrolet
7	Michael Annett (R)	Tommy Baldwin Racing	Chevrolet
9	Marcos Ambrose	Richard Petty Motorsports	Ford
10	Danica Patrick	Stewart–Haas Racing	Chevrolet
11	Denny Hamlin	Joe Gibbs Racing	Toyota
13	Casey Mears	Germain Racing	Chevrolet
14	Tony Stewart (PC3)	Stewart–Haas Racing	Chevrolet
15	Clint Bowyer	Michael Waltrip Racing	Toyota
16	Greg Biffle	Roush Fenway Racing	Ford
17	Ricky Stenhouse Jr.	Roush Fenway Racing	Ford
18	Kyle Busch	Joe Gibbs Racing	Toyota
20	Matt Kenseth (PC5)	Joe Gibbs Racing	Toyota
22	Joey Logano	Team Penske	Ford
23	Alex Bowman (R)	BK Racing	Toyota
24	Jeff Gordon (PC6)	Hendrick Motorsports	Chevrolet
26	Cole Whitt (R)	Swan Racing	Toyota
27	Paul Menard	Richard Childress Racing	Chevrolet
30	Parker Kligerman (R)	Swan Racing	Toyota
31	Ryan Newman	Richard Childress Racing	Chevrolet
32	Travis Kvapil	Go FAS Racing	Ford
33	Brian Scott (i)	Circle Sport	Chevrolet
34	David Ragan	Front Row Motorsports	Ford
35	David Reutimann	Front Row Motorsports	Ford
36	Reed Sorenson	Tommy Baldwin Racing	Chevrolet
38	David Gilliland	Front Row Motorsports	Ford
40	Landon Cassill (i)	Circle Sport	Chevrolet
41	Kurt Busch (PC4)	Stewart–Haas Racing	Chevrolet
42	Kyle Larson (R)	Chip Ganassi Racing	Chevrolet
43	Aric Almirola	Richard Petty Motorsports	Ford
47	A. J. Allmendinger	JTG Daugherty Racing	Chevrolet
48	Jimmie Johnson (PC1)	Hendrick Motorsports	Chevrolet
51	Justin Allgaier (R)	HScott Motorsports	Chevrolet
55	Brian Vickers	Michael Waltrip Racing	Toyota
66	Joe Nemechek (i)	Michael Waltrip Racing	Toyota
78	Martin Truex Jr.	Furniture Row Racing	Chevrolet
83	Ryan Truex (R)	BK Racing	Toyota
88	Dale Earnhardt Jr.	Hendrick Motorsports	Chevrolet
98	Josh Wise	Phil Parsons Racing	Chevrolet
99	Carl Edwards	Roush Fenway Racing	Ford
Official entry list

Key	Meaning
(R)	Rookie
(i)	Ineligible for points
(PC#)	Past champions provisional

== Practice ==
=== First practice ===
Jimmie Johnson was the fastest in the first practice session with a time of 38.163 and a speed of 188.664 mph (303.625 km/h). Landon Cassill wrecked his primary car during the session and was forced to roll out the backup car. Because this change took place prior to qualifying, he did not have to start from the rear of the field.

Pos	No.	Driver	Team	Manufacturer	Time	Speed
1	48	Jimmie Johnson	Hendrick Motorsports	Chevrolet	38.163	188.664
2	24	Jeff Gordon	Hendrick Motorsports	Chevrolet	38.194	188.511
3	15	Clint Bowyer	Michael Waltrip Racing	Toyota	38.344	187.774
Official first practice results

== Qualifying ==
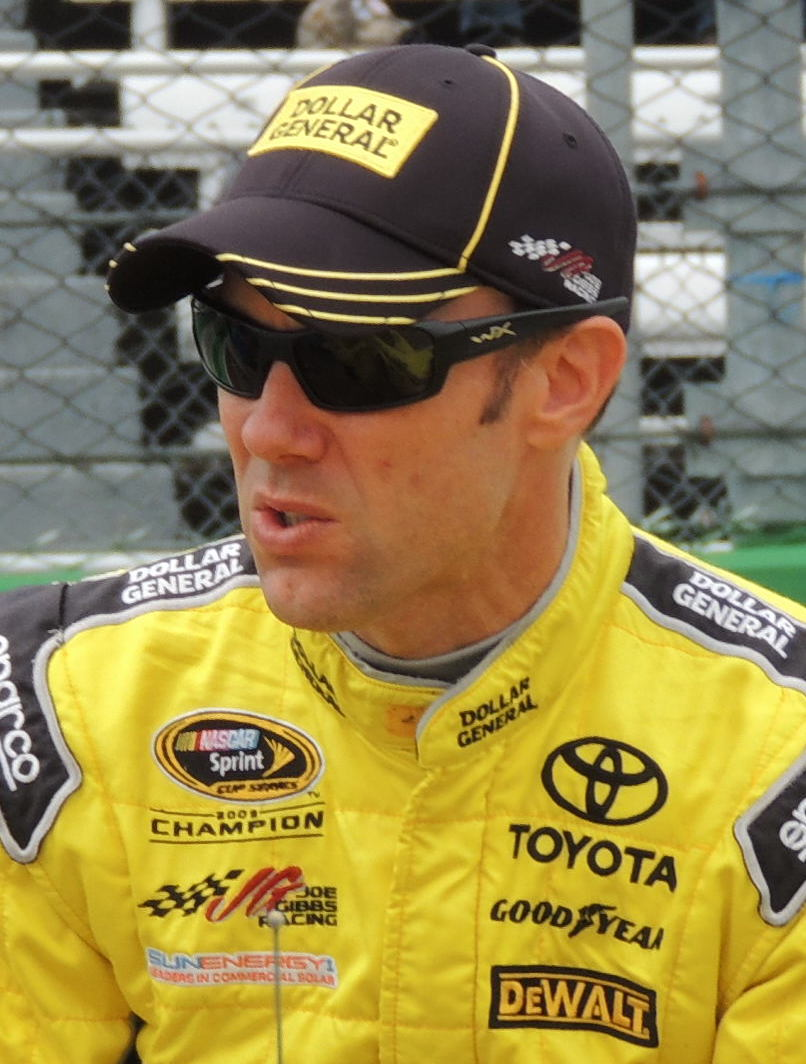
Matt Kenseth scored the pole position.

Matt Kenseth won the pole with a time of 38.438 and a speed of 187.315 mph (301.454 km/h). Kenseth praised the performance of his Joe Gibbs Racing team and their qualifying setup, stating that "they gave me the car and really all I did was not mess it up". Joining Kenseth on the front row was Brad Keselowski, who noted a change in tire performance compared to qualifying sessions earlier in the season. He stated that Auto Club Speedway was "probably the first qualifying effort where the cars have gone slower in the last round with the tire fall off playing a factor in that. So, each week is different as far as what it is going to take to make it through all three rounds. I think that is part of the interest and the challenge for us as teams and drivers". He also noted a potential for unpredictability, stating that there was an "infinite amount of variables and teams that can dial that in the best are the ones that will be up front. So far we have been able to do that which I think is a strong statement for our team". Jeff Gordon, who qualified sixth, stated that the tires were unpredictable, adding that "you're having to keep the same set of tires on the car and guess which direction it is going to go".

=== Qualifying results ===
Pos	No.	Driver	Team	Manufacturer	R1	R2	R3
1	20	Matt Kenseth	Joe Gibbs Racing	Toyota	38.418	38.423	38.438
2	2	Brad Keselowski	Team Penske	Ford	38.913	38.725	38.481
3	48	Jimmie Johnson	Hendrick Motorsports	Chevrolet	38.306	38.618	38.516
4	4	Kevin Harvick	Stewart–Haas Racing	Chevrolet	38.303	38.701	38.523
5	15	Clint Bowyer	Michael Waltrip Racing	Toyota	38.568	38.625	38.614
6	24	Jeff Gordon	Hendrick Motorsports	Chevrolet	38.426	38.397	38.630
7	22	Joey Logano (Note: Joey Logano and Martin Truex Jr. started from the rear after both drivers switched to a backup car post-qualifying.)	Team Penske	Ford	38.913	38.725	38.681
8	9	Marcos Ambrose	Richard Petty Motorsports	Ford	38.824	38.768	38.707
9	99	Carl Edwards	Roush Fenway Racing	Ford	38.773	38.643	38.735
10	14	Tony Stewart	Stewart–Haas Racing	Chevrolet	38.739	38.723	38.753
11	42	Kyle Larson (R)	Chip Ganassi Racing	Chevrolet	38.839	38.559	38.757
12	78	Martin Truex Jr.	Furniture Row Racing	Chevrolet	38.602	38.808	38.767
13	11	Denny Hamlin (Note: Denny Hamlin had qualified the car and was scheduled to compete as such. However, before the race, Hamlin was not medically cleared to drive due to a sinus infection. Sam Hornish Jr. drove in his place, and started from the rear of the field.)	Joe Gibbs Racing	Toyota	38.825	38.851	–
14	18	Kyle Busch	Joe Gibbs Racing	Toyota	39.012	38.853	–
15	88	Dale Earnhardt Jr.	Hendrick Motorsports	Chevrolet	38.943	38.858	–
16	31	Ryan Newman	Richard Childress Racing	Chevrolet	38.868	38.875	–
17	41	Kurt Busch	Stewart–Haas Racing	Chevrolet	38.685	38.884	–
18	47	A. J. Allmendinger	JTG Daugherty Racing	Toyota	38.862	38.979	–
19	55	Brian Vickers	Michael Waltrip Racing	Toyota	38.739	39.020	–
20	3	Austin Dillon (R)	Richard Childress Racing	Chevrolet	39.001	39.139	–
21	43	Aric Almirola	Richard Petty Motorsports	Ford	38.992	39.140	–
22	17	Ricky Stenhouse Jr.	Roush Fenway Racing	Ford	38.978	39.160	–
23	7	Michael Annett (R)	Tommy Baldwin Racing	Chevrolet	38.944	39.239	–
24	16	Greg Biffle	Roush Fenway Racing	Ford	38.899	0.000 (Note: Greg Biffle did not complete a lap in round 2 so he started 24th.)	–
25	1	Jamie McMurray	Chip Ganassi Racing	Chevrolet	39.019	–	–
26	5	Kasey Kahne	Hendrick Motorsports	Chevrolet	39.062	–	–
27	10	Danica Patrick	Stewart–Haas Racing	Chevrolet	39.067	–	–
28	51	Justin Allgaier (R)	HScott Motorsports	Chevrolet	39.134	–	–
29	38	David Gilliland	Front Row Motorsports	Ford	39.147	–	–
30	27	Matt Crafton (Note: Matt Crafton qualified for Paul Menard, who was on paternity leave. Menard returned for the race on the Sunday, and started from the rear of the field.)	Richard Childress Racing	Chevrolet	39.207	–	–
31	13	Casey Mears	Germain Racing	Chevrolet	39.220	–	–
32	30	Parker Kligerman (R)	Swan Racing	Toyota	39.362	–	–
33	35	David Reutimann	Front Row Motorsports	Toyota	39.513	–	–
34	26	Cole Whitt (R)	Swan Racing	Toyota	39.664	–	–
35	32	Travis Kvapil	Go FAS Racing	Ford	39.668	–	–
36	36	Reed Sorenson	Tommy Baldwin Racing	Chevrolet	39.699	–	–
37	33	Brian Scott	Richard Childress Racing	Chevrolet	39.725	–	–
38	98	Josh Wise	Phil Parsons Racing	Chevrolet	39.766	–	–
39	83	Ryan Truex (R)	BK Racing	Toyota	39.854	–	–
40	23	Alex Bowman (R)	BK Racing	Toyota	39.854	–	–
41	34	David Ragan	Front Row Motorsports	Ford	39.937	–	–
42	66	Joe Nemechek	Identity Ventures Racing	Toyota	39.998	–	–
43	40	Landon Cassill	Circle Sport	Chevrolet	0.000 (Note: Landon Cassill did not complete a lap in round 1 so he started 43rd.)	–	–
Official qualifying results

== Practice (post-qualifying) ==
=== Second practice ===
Kevin Harvick was the fastest in the second practice session with a time of 38.706 and a speed of 186.018 mph (299.367 km/h). Martin Truex Jr. hit the wall in turn 1 after his car cut down the left-rear tire, and this necessitated the rolling out of his backup car. Because this was a post-qualifying change, he was forced to start from the rear.

Pos	No.	Driver	Team	Manufacturer	Time	Speed
1	4	Kevin Harvick	Stewart–Haas Racing	Chevrolet	38.706	186.018
2	24	Jeff Gordon	Hendrick Motorsports	Chevrolet	38.777	185.677
3	22	Joey Logano	Team Penske	Ford	38.789	185.620
Official second practice results

=== Final practice ===
Brian Vickers was the fastest in the final practice session with a time of 38.725 and a speed of 185.926 mph (299.219 km/h). Joey Logano hit the wall in turn 2 after cutting down the left-rear tire. Like Truex, he was forced to start at the rear. Logano put the issue down to a combination of air pressure and car setup.

Pos	No.	Driver	Team	Manufacturer	Time	Speed
1	55	Brian Vickers	Michael Waltrip Racing	Toyota	38.725	185.926
2	24	Jeff Gordon	Hendrick Motorsports	Chevrolet	38.743	185.840
3	48	Jimmie Johnson	Hendrick Motorsports	Chevrolet	38.965	184.781
Official final practice results

== Race ==
=== Driver change ===
The night before the race, Denny Hamlin went to the infield care center at Auto Club Speedway due to an irritation in his eye. The irritation continued overnight, and it was reported at the time that he had a sinus infection. After being referred to a local hospital, the cause of the irritation was discovered to be a small piece of metal in his eye. J. D. Gibbs, president of Joe Gibbs Racing announced that Hamlin would not start the race less than an hour before the start. Sam Hornish Jr., who was on standby for Matt Kenseth in the previous day's Nationwide Series race, drove the No. 11 car in his place.

=== First half ===
==== Start ====
The race started at 3:16 p.m. Eastern time with Kenseth leading the field to the green flag. He was passed by Brad Keselowski on the first lap. The first caution of the race flew on lap 19 after Kevin Harvick cut down his right-rear tire on the front stretch. Jeff Gordon exited pit road third, but was caught speeding and had to restart from the rear. David Ragan stayed out when Keselowski pitted to lead a lap before pitting. The race restarted on lap 24 with Keselowski leading the way, but Kyle Busch soon passed him for the lead. Keselowski retook the lead on lap 27, and held the lead until the second caution of the race flew on lap 43 after Dale Earnhardt Jr. cut down the left-front tire and scraped the wall in Turn 1. Jimmie Johnson exited pit road first and assumed the lead for the restart on lap 48.

The third caution of the race flew on lap 57 after Tony Stewart spun out exiting turn 2. Clint Bowyer stayed out when Johnson pitted, believing that the light at the entrance to pit road to be red. Gordon and Keselowski did likewise, but Bowyer and Gordon pitted the following lap. The race restarted on lap 61 and Johnson had no trouble passing Keselowski for the lead with four new tires. The fourth caution of the race flew on lap 70 after Brian Scott got into Aric Almirola and sent them both spinning into the infield grass just past the entrance of pit road. Almirola had to back off the throttle when his forward progress was interrupted by Hornish. Scott was moving to the top of the race track and was caught by surprise. Upon being released from the infield care center, Almirola frankly stated that Scott was "out there having fun because his daddy gets to pay for it". Ryan Newman stayed out and took the lead.

=== Second half ===
==== Halfway ====
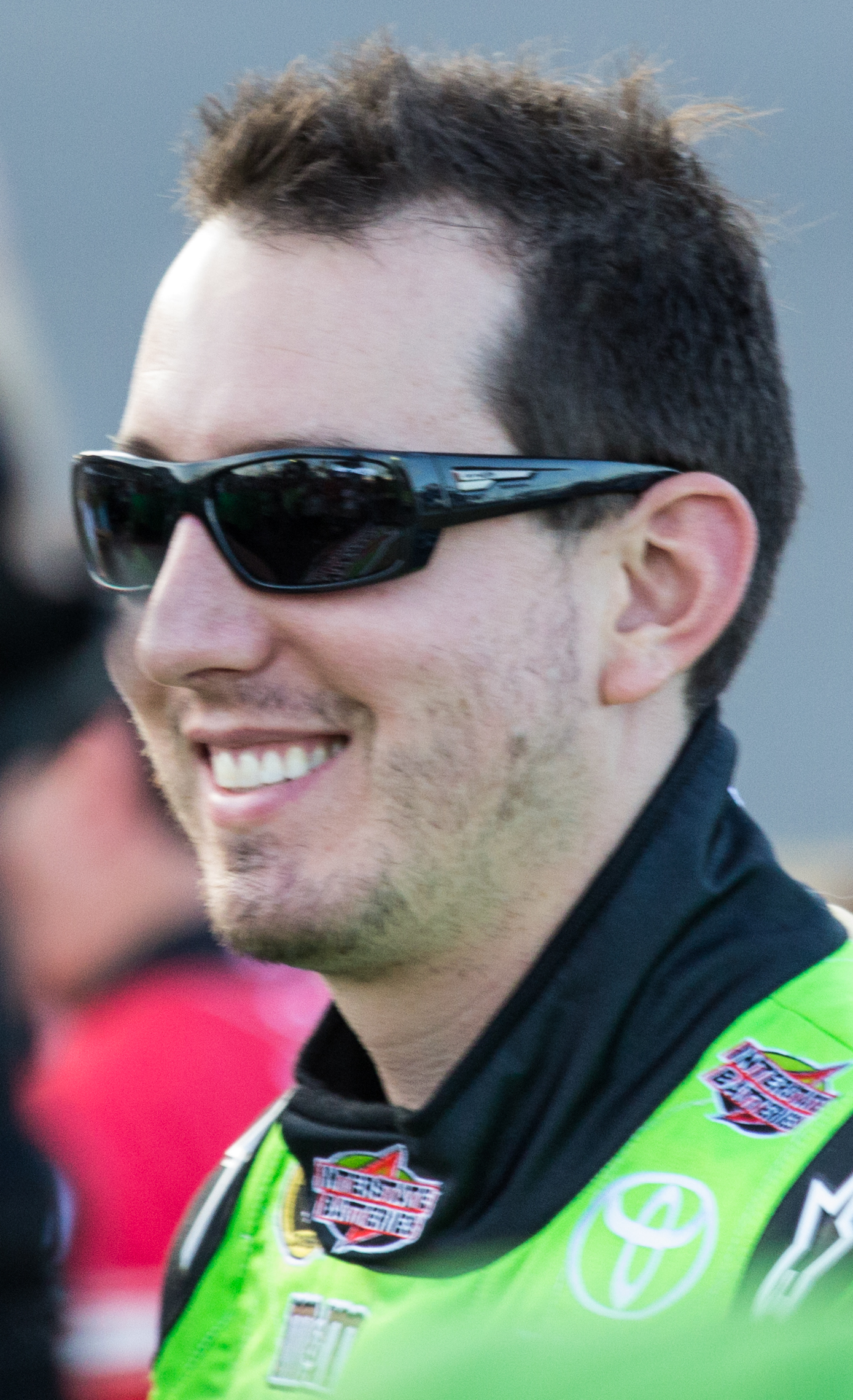
Kyle Busch won the race.

The race restarted on lap 75 and just like the previous restart, Kenseth had no trouble passing Newman with four new tires. Johnson retook the lead on lap 84, just before the fifth caution of the race flew on lap 86 after Parker Kligerman got loose and backed into the Turn 3 wall. Johnson and Kenseth swapped the lead on pit road, and Kenseth exited the leader. The race restarted on lap 91 and Johnson did not take long to pass Kenseth for the lead. Gordon took the race lead for the first time on lap 106, holding the lead to the sixth caution of the race, which flew on lap 118 after Carl Edwards cut down his left-rear tire and spun out in turn 2. Kenseth won the race off pit road and assumed the lead for the restart on lap 123. Johnson took back the lead on lap 127. Harvick was running third when he had another cut tire, this time the left-rear, with 63 laps to go.

==== Tire blowouts ====
Debris in turn 3 brought out the seventh caution of the race with 60 laps to go; Johnson and Gordon swapped the lead on pit road, but Johnson exited first, and the led the field to the restart, with 52 laps to go. The eighth caution of the race flew with 34 laps to go after David Gilliland rear-ended the wall in turn 4. Just like the previous pit cycle, Johnson and Gordon swapped the lead on pit road, and Johnson once again led off pit road, for the restart with 27 laps to go. With seven laps to go, Johnson cut down his left-front tire and Gordon took the lead. A number of cars started cutting down their tires including points leader Keselowski (right-rear), Marcos Ambrose (left-rear) and Bowyer who cut down his right-front tire; Bowyer spun out and brought out the ninth caution of the race with three laps to go, to cause a green–white–checker finish. Landon Cassill stayed out when Gordon pitted to assume the lead.

==== Finish ====
The race required only one attempt for the green–white–checker finish. Cassill did not put up a fight and Kurt Busch moved to the front. On the final lap, Kyle Busch passed his brother and held off a hard charging Kyle Larson to win the race. Upon exiting his car, Kyle Busch stated that the finish was exciting, and that "what do you expect when you have a green-white-checkered finish and everyone comes down pit road to put on four tires", believing the finish to be like something out of the movie Days of Thunder. After winning his first Nationwide Series race the previous day, Larson stated that it had "been a really good weekend" and that he had been battling "probably a 12th place car for most of the day".

=== Race results ===
Pos	No.	Driver	Team	Manufacturer	Laps	Points
1	18	Kyle Busch	Joe Gibbs Racing	Toyota	206	47
2	42	Kyle Larson (R)	Chip Ganassi Racing	Chevrolet	206	42
3	41	Kurt Busch	Stewart–Haas Racing	Chevrolet	206	42
4	20	Matt Kenseth	Joe Gibbs Racing	Toyota	206	41
5	14	Tony Stewart	Stewart–Haas Racing	Chevrolet	206	39
6	1	Jamie McMurray	Chip Ganassi Racing	Chevrolet	206	38
7	55	Brian Vickers	Michael Waltrip Racing	Toyota	206	38
8	47	A. J. Allmendinger	JTG Daugherty Racing	Chevrolet	206	36
9	27	Paul Menard	Richard Childress Racing	Chevrolet	206	35
10	99	Carl Edwards	Roush Fenway Racing	Ford	206	34
11	3	Austin Dillon (R)	Richard Childress Racing	Chevrolet	206	33
12	88	Dale Earnhardt Jr.	Hendrick Motorsports	Chevrolet	206	32
13	24	Jeff Gordon	Hendrick Motorsports	Chevrolet	206	32
14	10	Danica Patrick	Stewart–Haas Racing	Chevrolet	206	30
15	13	Casey Mears	Germain Racing	Chevrolet	206	29
16	15	Clint Bowyer	Michael Waltrip Racing	Toyota	206	29
17	11	Sam Hornish Jr.	Joe Gibbs Racing	Toyota	206	0
18	26	Cole Whitt (R)	Swan Racing	Toyota	206	26
19	7	Michael Annett (R)	Tommy Baldwin Racing	Chevrolet	206	25
20	31	Ryan Newman	Richard Childress Racing	Chevrolet	206	25
21	36	Reed Sorenson	Tommy Baldwin Racing	Chevrolet	206	24
22	23	Alex Bowman (R)	BK Racing	Toyota	206	22
23	78	Martin Truex Jr.	Furniture Row Racing	Chevrolet	206	21
24	48	Jimmie Johnson	Hendrick Motorsports	Chevrolet	206	22
25	40	Landon Cassill	Circle Sport	Chevrolet	205	0
26	2	Brad Keselowski	Team Penske	Ford	205	19
27	34	David Ragan	Front Row Motorsports	Ford	205	18
28	51	Justin Allgaier (R)	HScott Motorsports	Chevrolet	205	16
29	35	David Reutimann	Front Row Motorsports	Ford	205	16
30	9	Marcos Ambrose	Richard Petty Motorsports	Ford	205	14
31	83	Ryan Truex (R)	BK Racing	Toyota	205	13
32	66	Joe Nemechek	Identity Ventures Racing	Toyota	205	0
33	32	Travis Kvapil	Go FAS Racing	Ford	205	11
34	17	Ricky Stenhouse Jr.	Roush Fenway Racing	Ford	204	10
35	33	Brian Scott	Richard Childress Racing	Chevrolet	204	0
36	4	Kevin Harvick	Stewart–Haas Racing	Chevrolet	204	8
37	98	Josh Wise	Phil Parsons Racing	Chevrolet	204	7
38	38	David Gilliland	Front Row Motorsports	Ford	202	7
39	22	Joey Logano	Team Penske	Ford	195	5
40	16	Greg Biffle	Roush Fenway Racing	Ford	193	4
41	5	Kasey Kahne	Hendrick Motorsports	Chevrolet	180	3
42	30	Parker Kligerman (R)	Swan Racing	Toyota	85	2
43	43	Aric Almirola	Richard Petty Motorsports	Ford	68	1

=== Race summary ===
- Lead changes: 35 among different drivers
- Cautions/Laps: 8 for 38
- Red flags: 0
- Time of race: 3 hours, 5 minutes and 53 seconds
- Average speed: 132.937 miles per hour (213.941 km/h)

== Media ==
=== Television ===
Fox Sports
Booth announcers	Pit reporters
Lap-by-lap: Mike Joy; Color-commentator: Larry McReynolds; Color commentator: Darrell Waltrip	Matt Yocum; Steve Byrnes; Krista Voda; Jeff Hammond

=== Radio ===
MRN Radio
Booth announcers	Turn announcers	Pit reporters
Lead announcer: Joe Moore; Announcer: Jeff Striegle	Turns 1 & 2: Dave Moody; Turns 3 & 4: Dan Hubbard	Winston Kelly; Steve Post; Alex Hayden; Woody Cain

== Standings after the race ==
Drivers' Championship standings

	Pos	Driver	Points
2	1	Carl Edwards	186
	2	Dale Earnhardt Jr.	185 (−1)
1	3	Jeff Gordon	184 (−2)
3	4	Brad Keselowski	182(−4)
3	5	Matt Kenseth	179 (−7)
1	6	Jimmie Johnson	165 (−21)
7	7	Kyle Busch	158 (−28)
1	8	Ryan Newman	150 (−36)
4	9	Austin Dillon (R)	150 (−36)
4	10	Joey Logano	146 (−40)
4	11	Denny Hamlin	140 (−46)
4	12	Jamie McMurray	138 (−48)
5	13	Brian Vickers	137 (−49)
3	14	Paul Menard	134 (−52)
5	15	Ricky Stenhouse Jr.	132 (−54)
6	16	Kyle Larson (R)	131 (−55)

Manufacturers' Championship standings

Pos	Manufacturer	Points
1	Chevrolet	221
2	Ford	213 (−8)
3	Toyota	199 (−22)

- Note: Only the first sixteen positions are included for the driver standings.

== Notes ==
Previous race: 2014 Food City 500	Sprint Cup Series; 2014 season	Next race: 2014 STP 500
