= 2013 Auto Club 400 =

Race details
- Race 5 of 36 in the 2013 NASCAR Sprint Cup Series
- Track map of the speedway at Auto Club Speedway AKA California Speedway
- Date: March 24, 2013
- Location: Auto Club Speedway, Fontana, California, United States
- Course: Permanent racing facility
- Course length: 2 miles (3.2 km)
- Distance: 200 laps, 400 mi (643.7 km)
- Weather: Clear with a temperature around 73 °F (23 °C); wind out of the SW at 9 miles per hour (14 km/h).
- Average speed: 135.351 mph (217.826 km/h)

Pole position
Driver	Denny Hamlin	Joe Gibbs Racing
- Time: 38.410 seconds

Most laps led
Driver	Kyle Busch	Joe Gibbs Racing
- Laps: 125

Winner
No. 18	Kyle Busch	Joe Gibbs Racing

Television in the United States
- Network: Fox
- Announcers: Mike Joy, Darrell Waltrip and Larry McReynolds
- Nielsen ratings: 4.7/10 (8.002 million viewers)

The 2013 Auto Club 400 was a NASCAR Sprint Cup Series stock car race held on March 24, 2013, at Auto Club Speedway in Fontana, California, United States. Contested over 200 laps on the 2-mile (3.2 km) asphalt D-shaped oval, it was the fifth race of the 2013 Sprint Cup Series championship. Kyle Busch of Joe Gibbs Racing won the race, his first of the season, and the first Sprint Cup win at Auto Club for Joe Gibbs, completing a weekend sweep, while Dale Earnhardt Jr. finished second. Joey Logano, Carl Edwards and Kurt Busch rounded out the top five.

== Report ==
=== Background ===
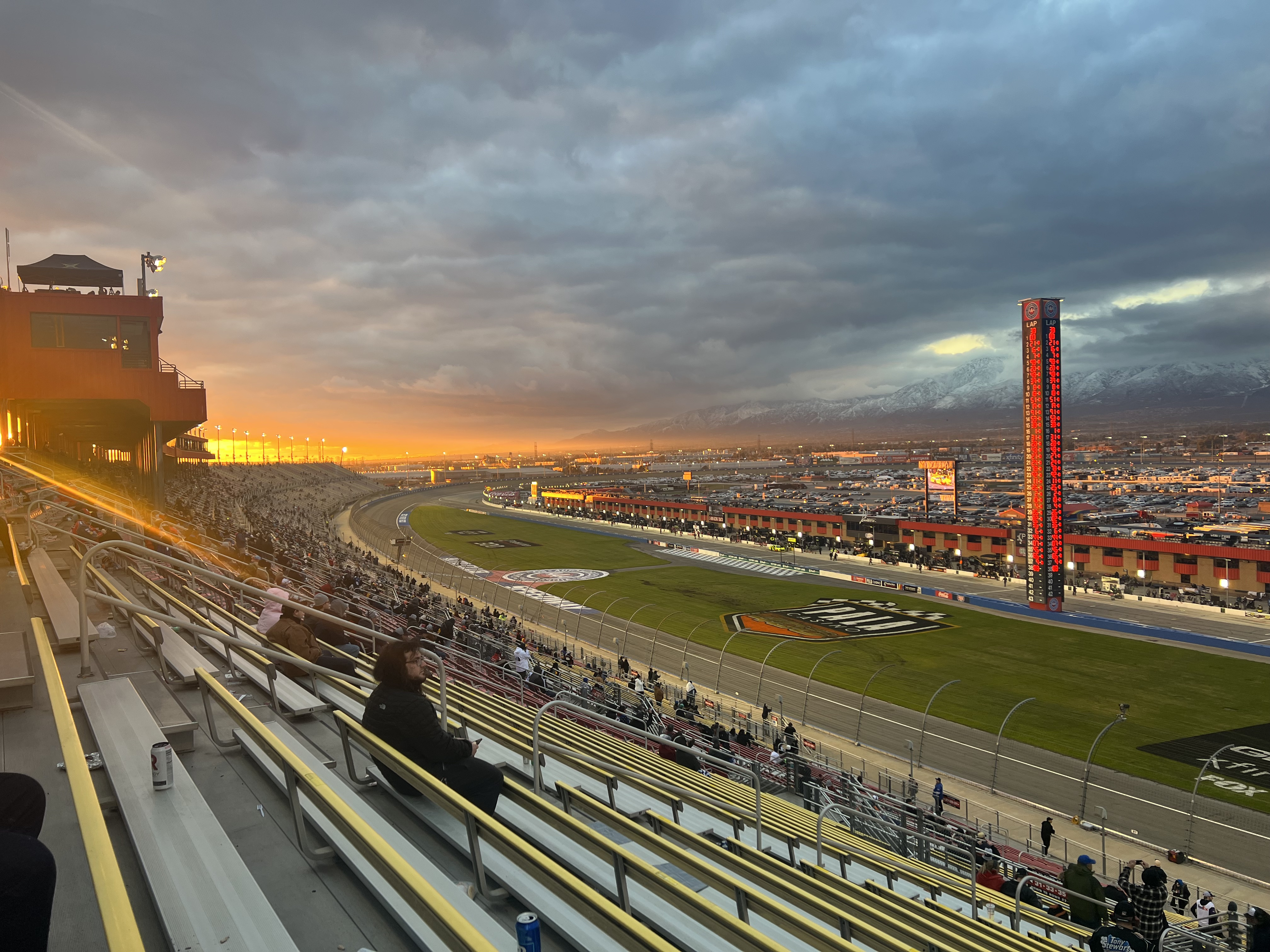
Auto Club Speedway, the track where the race was held.

Auto Club Speedway was a four-turn superspeedway that was 2 miles (3.2 km) long. The track's turns were banked from fourteen degrees, while the front stretch, the location of the finish line, was banked at eleven degrees. Unlike the front stretch, the backstraightaway was banked at three degrees. The track had a seating capacity of 92,100 people. The race consisted of 200 laps, which is equivalent to a race distance of 400 miles (640 km).

Before the race, Brad Keselowski was leading the Drivers' Championship with 166 points, while Dale Earnhardt Jr. stood in second with 157 points. Jimmie Johnson followed in the third position, 23 points ahead of Clint Bowyer and 25 points ahead of Greg Biffle in fourth and fifth. Denny Hamlin, with 125, was one point ahead of Kasey Kahne and Carl Edwards, as Paul Menard was three points ahead of Kyle Busch and Ricky Stenhouse Jr. in tenth and eleventh. Joey Logano completed the first twelve positions with 104 points. The defending winner of the race was Tony Stewart, who won the race in 2012.

=== Entry list ===
(R) - Denotes rookie driver.

(i) - Denotes driver who is ineligible for series driver points.

No.	Driver	Team	Manufacturer
1	Jamie McMurray	Earnhardt Ganassi Racing	Chevrolet
2	Brad Keselowski	Penske Racing	Ford
5	Kasey Kahne	Hendrick Motorsports	Chevrolet
7	Dave Blaney	Tommy Baldwin Racing	Chevrolet
9	Marcos Ambrose	Richard Petty Motorsports	Ford
10	Danica Patrick (R)	Stewart–Haas Racing	Chevrolet
11	Denny Hamlin	Joe Gibbs Racing	Toyota
13	Casey Mears	Germain Racing	Ford
14	Tony Stewart	Stewart–Haas Racing	Chevrolet
15	Clint Bowyer	Michael Waltrip Racing	Toyota
16	Greg Biffle	Roush Fenway Racing	Ford
17	Ricky Stenhouse Jr. (R)	Roush Fenway Racing	Ford
18	Kyle Busch	Joe Gibbs Racing	Toyota
19	Mike Bliss (i)	Humphrey Smith Racing	Toyota
20	Matt Kenseth	Joe Gibbs Racing	Toyota
22	Joey Logano	Penske Racing	Ford
24	Jeff Gordon	Hendrick Motorsports	Chevrolet
27	Paul Menard	Richard Childress Racing	Chevrolet
29	Kevin Harvick	Richard Childress Racing	Chevrolet
30	David Stremme	Swan Racing	Toyota
31	Jeff Burton	Richard Childress Racing	Chevrolet
32	Timmy Hill (R)	FAS Lane Racing	Ford
33	Landon Cassill (i)	Circle Sport	Chevrolet
34	David Ragan	Front Row Motorsports	Ford
35	Josh Wise (i)	Front Row Motorsports	Ford
36	J. J. Yeley	Tommy Baldwin Racing	Chevrolet
38	David Gilliland	Front Row Motorsports	Ford
39	Ryan Newman	Stewart–Haas Racing	Chevrolet
42	Juan Pablo Montoya	Earnhardt Ganassi Racing	Chevrolet
43	Aric Almirola	Richard Petty Motorsports	Ford
44	Scott Riggs	Xxxtreme Motorsports	Ford
47	Bobby Labonte	JTG Daugherty Racing	Toyota
48	Jimmie Johnson	Hendrick Motorsports	Chevrolet
51	A. J. Allmendinger	Phoenix Racing	Chevrolet
55	Mark Martin	Michael Waltrip Racing	Toyota
56	Martin Truex Jr.	Michael Waltrip Racing	Toyota
78	Kurt Busch	Furniture Row Racing	Chevrolet
83	David Reutimann	BK Racing	Toyota
87	Joe Nemechek (i)	NEMCO-Jay Robinson Racing	Toyota
88	Dale Earnhardt Jr.	Hendrick Motorsports	Chevrolet
93	Travis Kvapil	BK Racing	Toyota
98	Michael McDowell	Phil Parsons Racing	Ford
99	Carl Edwards	Roush Fenway Racing	Ford
Official entry list

=== Practice and qualifying ===
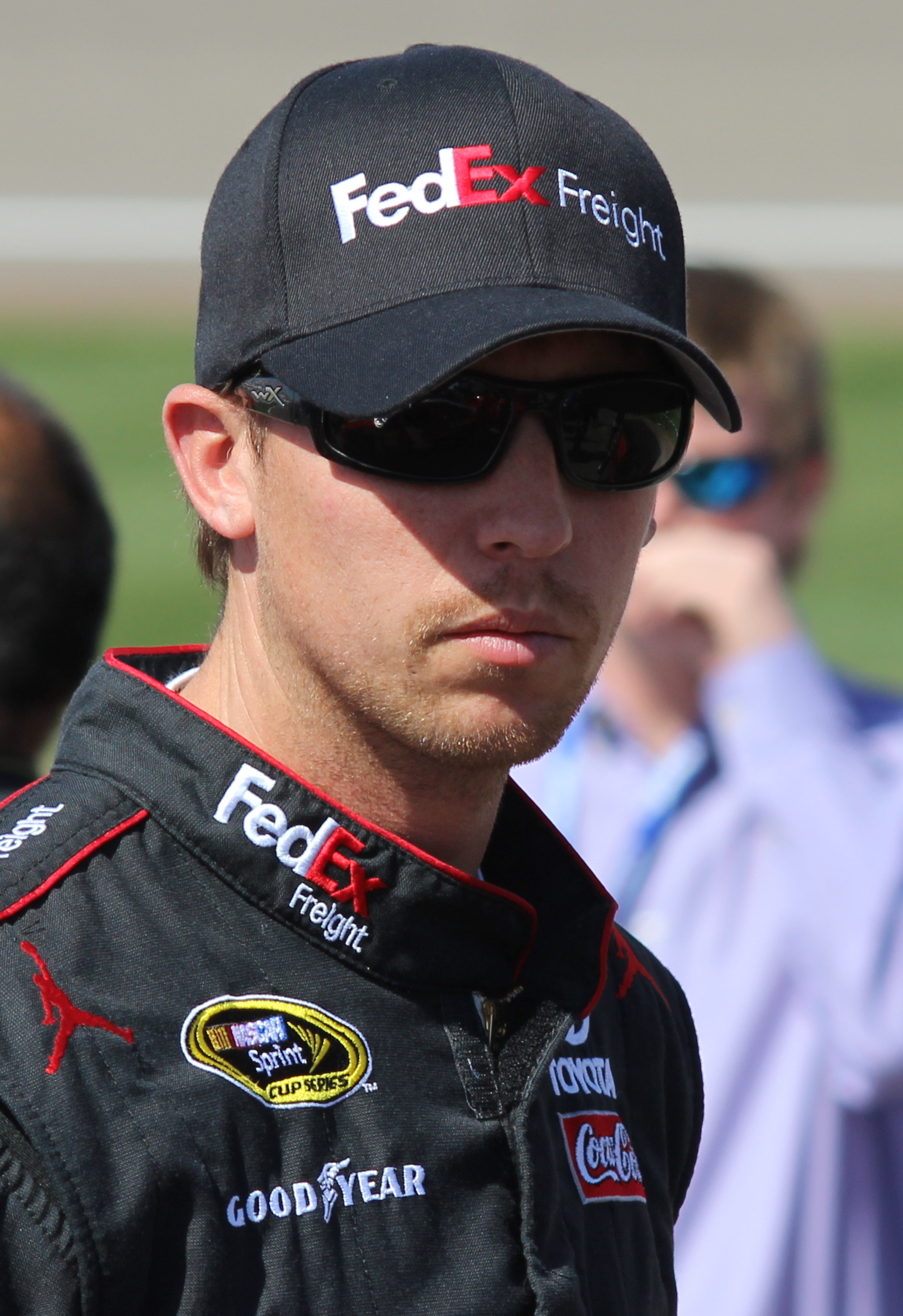
Denny Hamlin won the pole position, the twelfth of his career

Three practice sessions were held before the race. The first session, held on March 22, 2013, was 60 minutes long. The second and third were held on March 23, and were 55 and 50 minutes long. During the first practice session, Bowyer was quickest with a time of 38.832, ahead of Hamlin and A. J. Allmendinger in second and third. Kyle Busch followed in the fourth position, ahead of Logano in fifth.

In the Saturday morning session, Biffle was quickest, ahead of Allmendinger and Busch in second and third. Hamlin and Kurt Busch followed in the fourth and fifth positions. Bowyer, Mark Martin, Earnhardt Jr., Martin Truex Jr., and Logano rounded out the first ten positions. In the final practice session for the race, Martin was quickest with a time of 39.269 seconds. Bowyer followed in second, ahead of Matt Kenseth and Johnson in third and fourth. Keselowski, who was eighteenth quickest in second practice, managed fifth.

During qualifying, forty-three cars were entered, meaning all of the cars were able to start because of NASCAR's qualifying procedure. Hamlin clinched his twelfth career pole position, with a time of 38.410 seconds. After his qualifying run, Hamlin commented,“Honestly, I think our car was really fast. I knew, talking to a few people in my motor home... it’s cocky to say, but I said, ‘Man, I can almost guarantee a pole, if we have a late draw.’ When they told me we were third, I was like, ‘OK. Well, just never mind. Forget that." He was joined on the front row of the grid by Biffle. Keselowski qualified third, Kyle Busch took fourth, and Kenseth started fifth. Logano, Truex Jr., Tony Stewart, Martin, and Kurt Busch completed the first ten positions on the grid.

=== Race ===
With seven laps to go, Joey Logano took the lead after a brief duel with former teammates Kyle Busch and Denny Hamlin. Hamlin and Logano had been involved in an incident the previous race at Bristol, with the sentiments carrying over to this race. Hamlin chased Logano down and the two were side-by-side for most of the final lap, but Logano attempted to block Hamlin in the final turn and was sent up into the outside wall, while Hamlin came off the banking and smashed head-on into the inside concrete retaining wall, allowing Busch to pass both cars on the high side and take the win.

Although Hamlin climbed out of the car right after the crash, he immediately collapsed and lied on the track. He was airlifted to the hospital as a precaution. It was announced the next day that Hamlin had suffered a massive L1 compression fracture, or a collapsed vertebra, likely because the area where his car hit the wall was lacking a SAFER barrier. The resulting injuries forced Hamlin to miss the next four races. Mark Martin filled in for Hamlin at Martinsville while Brian Vickers filled in at Texas, Kansas, and Richmond. Hamlin did not start another race until Talladega in May, although the team arranged for Vickers to take over at the first caution flag pit stop. Hamlin did not return full-time to his race car until the following week at Darlington.

In response to the accident, for 2014, Auto Club Speedway installed an additional 1,000 foot SAFER barrier along the wall where Hamlin's car had impacted.

Following the finish, Logano was also involved in an altercation with Stewart after a blocking move made by Logano on Stewart during the final restart. Stewart ended with a 22nd-place finish following the incident. Stewart went on to confront Logano in the pit lane and who had to be restrained by crews from Danica Patrick's team after Logano threw a water bottle at Stewart.

== Results ==
=== Qualifying ===
Grid	No.	Driver	Team	Manufacturer	Time	Speed
1	11	Denny Hamlin	Joe Gibbs Racing	Toyota	38.410	187.451
2	16	Greg Biffle	Roush Fenway Racing	Ford	38.458	187.217
3	2	Brad Keselowski	Penske Racing	Ford	38.472	187.149
4	18	Kyle Busch	Joe Gibbs Racing	Toyota	38.476	187.130
5	20	Matt Kenseth	Joe Gibbs Racing	Toyota	38.567	186.688
6	22	Joey Logano	Penske Racing	Ford	38.603	186.514
7	56	Martin Truex Jr.	Michael Waltrip Racing	Toyota	38.653	186.273
8	14	Tony Stewart	Stewart–Haas Racing	Chevrolet	38.738	185.864
9	55	Mark Martin	Michael Waltrip Racing	Toyota	38.753	185.792
10	78	Kurt Busch	Furniture Row Racing	Chevrolet	38.777	185.677
11	13	Casey Mears	Germain Racing	Ford	38.886	185.157
12	42	Juan Pablo Montoya	Earnhardt Ganassi Racing	Chevrolet	38.901	185.085
13	15	Clint Bowyer	Michael Waltrip Racing	Toyota	38.945	184.876
14	29	Kevin Harvick	Richard Childress Racing	Chevrolet	38.979	184.715
15	88	Dale Earnhardt Jr.	Hendrick Motorsports	Chevrolet	38.998	184.625
16	5	Kasey Kahne	Hendrick Motorsports	Chevrolet	39.051	184.374
17	1	Jamie McMurray	Earnhardt Ganassi Racing	Chevrolet	39.081	184.233
18	48	Jimmie Johnson	Hendrick Motorsports	Chevrolet	39.121	184.044
19	24	Jeff Gordon	Hendrick Motorsports	Chevrolet	39.128	184.011
20	39	Ryan Newman	Stewart–Haas Racing	Chevrolet	39.133	183.988
21	9	Marcos Ambrose	Richard Petty Motorsports	Ford	39.162	183.852
22	31	Jeff Burton	Richard Childress Racing	Chevrolet	39.194	183.702
23	43	Aric Almirola	Richard Petty Motorsports	Ford	39.195	183.697
24	99	Carl Edwards	Roush Fenway Racing	Ford	39.222	183.570
25	47	Bobby Labonte	JTG Daugherty Racing	Toyota	39.291	183.248
26	51	A. J. Allmendinger	Phoenix Racing	Chevrolet	39.320	183.113
27	27	Paul Menard	Richard Childress Racing	Chevrolet	39.340	183.020
28	83	David Reutimann	BK Racing	Toyota	39.382	182.825
29	7	Dave Blaney	Tommy Baldwin Racing	Chevrolet	39.418	182.658
30	35	Josh Wise	Front Row Motorsports	Ford	39.422	182.639
31	17	Ricky Stenhouse Jr.	Roush Fenway Racing	Ford	39.448	182.519
32	30	David Stremme	Swan Racing	Toyota	39.458	182.473
33	93	Travis Kvapil	BK Racing	Toyota	39.465	182.440
34	38	David Gilliland	Front Row Motorsports	Ford	39.671	181.493
35	98	Michael McDowell	Phil Parsons Racing	Ford	39.760	181.087
36	33	Landon Cassill	Circle Sport	Chevrolet	39.760	181.087
37	36	J. J. Yeley	Tommy Baldwin Racing	Chevrolet	39.955	180.203
38	44	Scott Riggs	XXXtreme Motorsports	Ford	40.038	179.829
39	32	Timmy Hill	FAS Lane Racing	Ford	40.118	179.471
40	10	Danica Patrick	Stewart–Haas Racing	Chevrolet	40.155	179.305
41	19	Mike Bliss	Humphrey Smith Racing	Toyota	40.369	178.355
42	34	David Ragan	Front Row Motorsports	Ford	40.492	177.813
43	87	Joe Nemechek	NEMCO-Jay Robinson Racing	Toyota	40.645	177.144

=== Race results ===
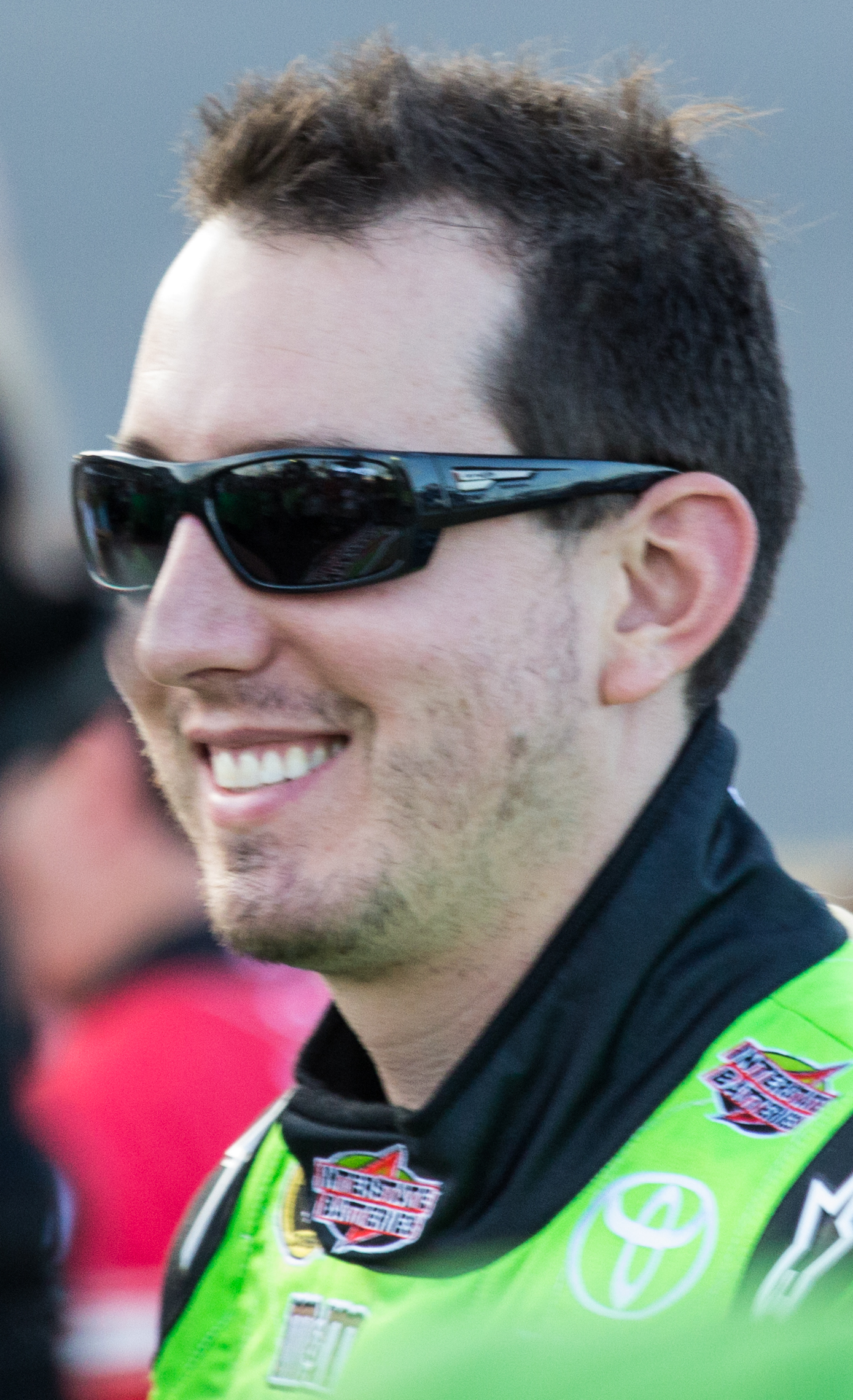
Kyle Busch won the race.

Pos	Car	Driver	Team	Manufacturer	Laps	Points
1	18	Kyle Busch	Joe Gibbs Racing	Toyota	200	48
2	88	Dale Earnhardt Jr.	Hendrick Motorsports	Chevrolet	200	42
3	22	Joey Logano	Penske Racing	Ford	200	42
4	99	Carl Edwards	Roush-Fenway Racing	Ford	200	40
5	78	Kurt Busch	Furniture Row Racing	Chevrolet	200	39
6	16	Greg Biffle	Roush-Fenway Racing	Ford	200	38
7	20	Matt Kenseth	Joe Gibbs Racing	Toyota	200	38
8	27	Paul Menard	Richard Childress Racing	Chevrolet	200	36
9	5	Kasey Kahne	Hendrick Motorsports	Chevrolet	200	35
10	39	Ryan Newman	Stewart–Haas Racing	Chevrolet	200	34
11	24	Jeff Gordon	Hendrick Motorsports	Chevrolet	200	33
12	48	Jimmie Johnson	Hendrick Motorsports	Chevrolet	200	32
13	29	Kevin Harvick	Richard Childress Racing	Chevrolet	200	32
14	43	Aric Almirola	Richard Petty Motorsports	Ford	200	30
15	13	Casey Mears	Germain Racing	Ford	200	29
16	51	A. J. Allmendinger	Phoenix Racing	Chevrolet	200	28
17	31	Jeff Burton	Richard Childress Racing	Chevrolet	200	27
18	56	Martin Truex Jr.	Michael Waltrip Racing	Toyota	200	26
19	1	Jamie McMurray	Earnhardt Ganassi Racing	Chevrolet	200	25
20	17	Ricky Stenhouse Jr.	Roush-Fenway Racing	Ford	200	24
21	7	Dave Blaney	Tommy Baldwin Racing	Chevrolet	200	23
22	14	Tony Stewart	Stewart–Haas Racing	Chevrolet	200	23
23	2	Brad Keselowski	Penske Racing	Ford	200	21
24	34	David Ragan	Front Row Motorsports	Ford	200	21
25	11	Denny Hamlin	Joe Gibbs Racing	Toyota	199	20
26	10	Danica Patrick	Stewart–Haas Racing	Chevrolet	199	18
27	36	J. J. Yeley	Tommy Baldwin Racing	Chevrolet	199	17
28	47	Bobby Labonte	JTG Daugherty Racing	Toyota	198	16
29	38	David Gilliland	Front Row Motorsports	Ford	198	15
30	33	Landon Cassill	Circle Sport	Chevrolet	194	14
31	30	David Stremme	Swan Racing Company	Toyota	193	13
32	87	Joe Nemechek	NEMCO-Jay Robinson Racing	Toyota	193	0
33	83	David Reutimann	BK Racing	Toyota	192	11
34	93	Travis Kvapil	BK Racing	Toyota	188	11
35	15	Clint Bowyer	Michael Waltrip Racing	Toyota	184	9
36	9	Marcos Ambrose	Richard Petty Motorsports	Ford	182	8
37	55	Mark Martin	Michael Waltrip Racing	Toyota	179	7
38	42	Juan Pablo Montoya	Earnhardt Ganassi Racing	Chevrolet	169	6
39	32	Timmy Hill	FAS Lane Racing	Ford	108	5
40	35	Josh Wise	Front Row Motorsports	Ford	103	0
41	44	Scott Riggs	XXXtreme Motorsports	Ford	66	3
42	98	Michael McDowell	Phil Parsons Racing	Ford	60	2
43	19	Mike Bliss	Humphrey Smith Racing	Toyota	44	0

== Standings after the race ==
Drivers' Championship standings

	Pos	Driver	Points
1	1	Dale Earnhardt Jr.	199
1	2	Brad Keselowski	187
	3	Jimmie Johnson	183
4	4	Carl Edwards	164
	5	Greg Biffle	164

Manufacturers' Championship standings

Pos	Manufacturer	Points
1	Chevrolet	36
2	Toyota	34
3	Ford	25

- Note: Only the first twelve positions are included for the driver standings.

Previous race: 2013 Food City 500	Sprint Cup Series; 2013 season	Next race: 2013 STP Gas Booster 500
