= 2013 Pure Michigan 400 =

Race details
- Race 23 of 36 in the 2013 NASCAR Sprint Cup Series
- 2013 Pure Michigan 400 program cover
- Date: August 18, 2013
- Location: Michigan International Speedway; Brooklyn, Michigan
- Course: Permanent racing facility
- Course length: 2.0 miles (3.2 km)
- Distance: 200 laps, 400 mi (640 km)
- Weather: Temperatures up to 81 °F (27 °C); wind speeds up to 4.1 miles per hour (6.6 km/h)
- Average speed: 144.593 mph (232.700 km/h)

Pole position
Driver	Joey Logano	Penske Racing
- Time: 35.303 seconds

Most laps led
Driver	Joey Logano	Penske Racing
- Laps: 52

Winner
No. 22	Joey Logano	Penske Racing

Television in the United States
- Network: ESPN
- Announcers: Allen Bestwick, Dale Jarrett and Andy Petree
- Nielsen ratings: 3.0 (4.585 million viewers)

The 2013 Pure Michigan 400 was a NASCAR Sprint Cup Series stock car race that was held on August 18, 2013, at Michigan International Speedway in Brooklyn, Michigan. Contested over 200 laps on the 2.0-mile (3.2 km) superspeedway, it was the twenty-third race of the 2013 NASCAR Sprint Cup Series season. Joey Logano of Penske Racing won the race, his first of the season. Kevin Harvick finished second while Kurt Busch, Paul Menard, and Clint Bowyer rounded out the top five.

== Report ==
=== Background ===
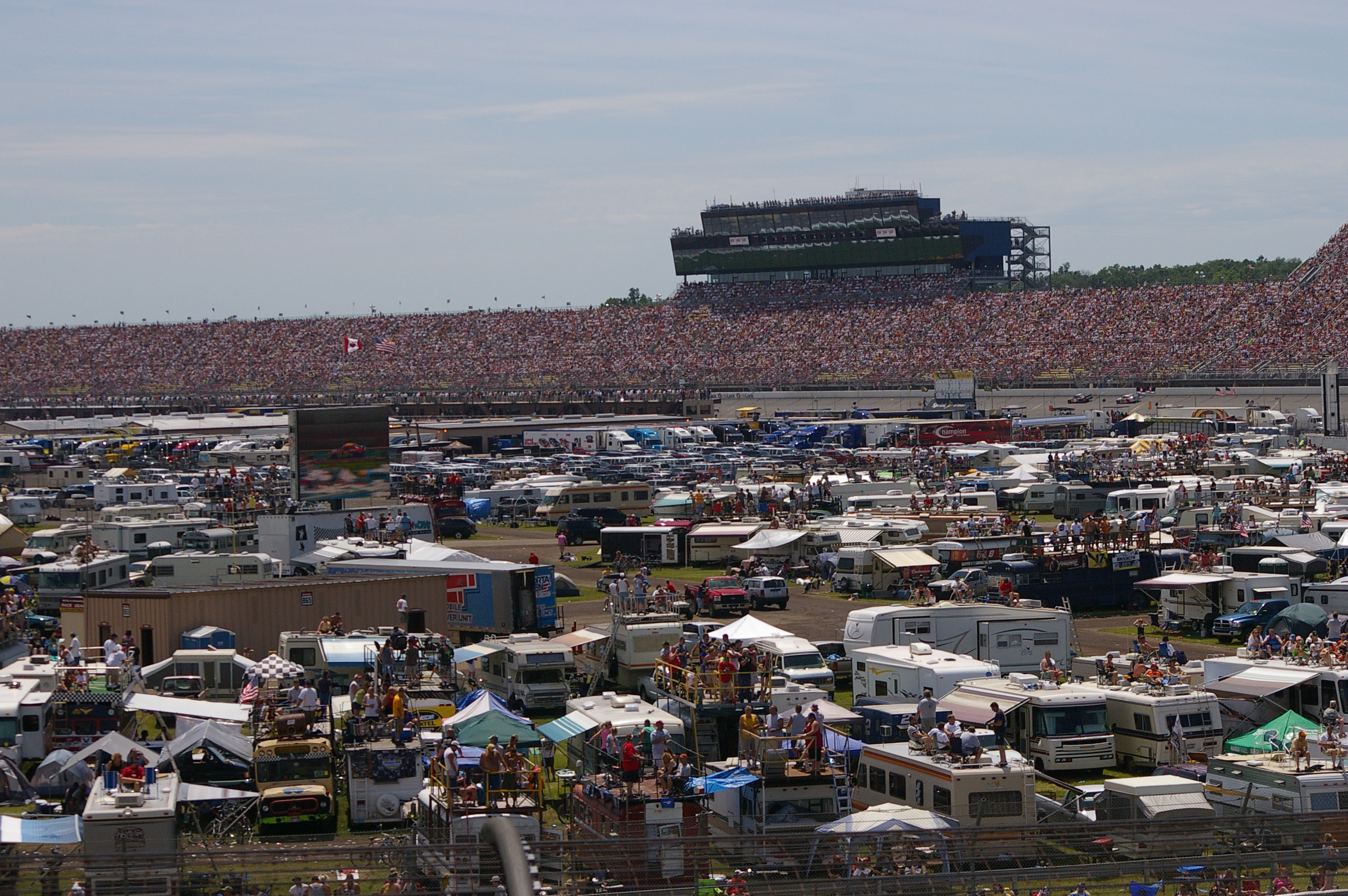
Michigan International Speedway's front stretch and infield.

Michigan International Speedway is a four-turn superspeedway that is 2 miles (3.2 km) long. Opened in 1960, the track's turns are banked at eighteen degrees, while the 3,600-foot-long front stretch, the location of the finish line, is banked at twelve degrees. The back stretch, has a five degree banking and is 2,242 feet long. Michigan International Speedway has a grandstand seating capacity of 84,000 people. Greg Biffle was the defending race winner after winning the race in 2012.

Before the race, Jimmie Johnson was leading the Drivers' Championship with 808 points, while Clint Bowyer stood in second with 733 points. Carl Edwards followed in the third with 728, twenty-one points ahead of Kevin Harvick and thirty-five ahead of Kyle Busch in fourth and fifth. Dale Earnhardt Jr., with 670, was in sixth; eleven ahead of Matt Kenseth, who was scored seventh. Eighth-placed Brad Keselowski was seven points ahead of Biffle and nine ahead of Martin Truex Jr. in ninth and tenth. In the Manufacturers' Championship, Chevrolet was leading with 156 points, twelve points ahead of Toyota. Ford was third with 111 points.

=== Entry list ===
(R) - Denotes rookie driver.

(i) - Denotes driver who is ineligible for series driver points.

No.	Driver	Team	Manufacturer
1	Jamie McMurray	Earnhardt Ganassi Racing	Chevrolet
2	Brad Keselowski	Penske Racing	Ford
5	Kasey Kahne	Hendrick Motorsports	Chevrolet
7	Dave Blaney	Tommy Baldwin Racing	Chevrolet
9	Marcos Ambrose	Richard Petty Motorsports	Ford
10	Danica Patrick (R)	Stewart–Haas Racing	Chevrolet
11	Denny Hamlin	Joe Gibbs Racing	Toyota
13	Casey Mears	Germain Racing	Ford
14	Austin Dillon (i)	Stewart–Haas Racing	Chevrolet
15	Clint Bowyer	Michael Waltrip Racing	Toyota
16	Greg Biffle	Roush Fenway Racing	Ford
17	Ricky Stenhouse Jr. (R)	Roush Fenway Racing	Ford
18	Kyle Busch	Joe Gibbs Racing	Toyota
19	Scott Riggs	Humphrey Smith Racing	Toyota
20	Matt Kenseth	Joe Gibbs Racing	Toyota
21	Trevor Bayne (i)	Wood Brothers Racing	Ford
22	Joey Logano	Penske Racing	Ford
24	Jeff Gordon	Hendrick Motorsports	Chevrolet
27	Paul Menard	Richard Childress Racing	Chevrolet
29	Kevin Harvick	Richard Childress Racing	Chevrolet
30	David Stremme	Swan Racing	Toyota
31	Jeff Burton	Richard Childress Racing	Chevrolet
32	Timmy Hill (R)	FAS Lane Racing	Ford
33	Landon Cassill (i)	Circle Sport	Chevrolet
34	David Ragan	Front Row Motorsports	Ford
35	Josh Wise (i)	Front Row Motorsports	Ford
36	J. J. Yeley	Tommy Baldwin Racing	Chevrolet
38	David Gilliland	Front Row Motorsports	Ford
39	Ryan Newman	Stewart–Haas Racing	Chevrolet
42	Juan Pablo Montoya	Earnhardt Ganassi Racing	Chevrolet
43	Aric Almirola	Richard Petty Motorsports	Ford
47	Bobby Labonte	JTG Daugherty Racing	Toyota
48	Jimmie Johnson	Hendrick Motorsports	Chevrolet
51	Brendan Gaughan (i)	Phoenix Racing	Chevrolet
55	Mark Martin	Michael Waltrip Racing	Toyota
56	Martin Truex Jr.	Michael Waltrip Racing	Toyota
78	Kurt Busch	Furniture Row Racing	Chevrolet
83	David Reutimann	BK Racing	Toyota
87	Joe Nemechek (i)	NEMCO-Jay Robinson Racing	Toyota
88	Dale Earnhardt Jr.	Hendrick Motorsports	Chevrolet
93	Travis Kvapil	BK Racing	Toyota
95	Scott Speed	Leavine Family Racing	Ford
98	Johnny Sauter (i)	Phil Parsons Racing	Ford
99	Carl Edwards	Roush Fenway Racing	Ford
Official entry list

=== Practice and qualifying ===
Three practice sessions were held before the race. The first session, scheduled on August 16, 2013, was 90 minutes long. The second and third, held a day later on August 17, 2013, were each 55 minutes long. The qualifying for the event was the final ever broadcast for Speed, when Fox NASCAR play-by-play announcer Mike Joy said the final moments of Speed Channel and Fox NFL Sunday host Curt Menefee introduced Fox Sports 1 the following day.

== Results ==
=== Qualifying ===
Grid	No.	Driver	Team	Manufacturer	Time	Speed
1	22	Joey Logano	Penske Racing	Ford	35.303	203.949
2	78	Kurt Busch	Furniture Row Racing	Chevrolet	35.347	203.695
3	48	Jimmie Johnson	Hendrick Motorsports	Chevrolet	35.386	203.470
4	55	Mark Martin	Michael Waltrip Racing	Toyota	35.430	203.218
5	31	Jeff Burton	Richard Childress Racing	Chevrolet	35.448	203.114
6	42	Juan Pablo Montoya	Earnhardt Ganassi Racing	Chevrolet	35.470	202.998
7	88	Dale Earnhardt Jr.	Hendrick Motorsports	Chevrolet	35.500	202.817
8	11	Denny Hamlin	Joe Gibbs Racing	Toyota	35.503	202.800
9	2	Brad Keselowski	Penske Racing	Ford	35.516	202.726
10	18	Kyle Busch	Joe Gibbs Racing	Toyota	35.576	202.384
11	15	Clint Bowyer	Michael Waltrip Racing	Toyota	35.590	202.304
12	20	Matt Kenseth	Joe Gibbs Racing	Toyota	35.603	202.230
13	24	Jeff Gordon	Hendrick Motorsports	Chevrolet	35.623	202.117
14	43	Aric Almirola	Richard Petty Motorsports	Ford	35.679	201.799
15	29	Kevin Harvick	Richard Childress Racing	Chevrolet	35.707	201.641
16	16	Greg Biffle	Roush Fenway Racing	Ford	35.716	201.590
17	56	Martin Truex Jr.	Michael Waltrip Racing	Toyota	35.716	201.590
18	21	Trevor Bayne	Wood Brothers Racing	Ford	35.761	201.337
19	99	Carl Edwards	Roush Fenway Racing	Ford	35.815	201.033
20	27	Paul Menard	Richard Childress Racing	Chevrolet	35.868	200.736
21	39	Ryan Newman	Stewart–Haas Racing	Chevrolet	35.890	200.613
22	17	Ricky Stenhouse Jr.	Roush Fenway Racing	Ford	35.890	200.613
23	38	David Gilliland	Front Row Motorsports	Ford	35.907	200.518
24	34	David Ragan	Front Row Motorsports	Ford	35.953	200.261
25	83	David Reutimann	BK Racing	Toyota	35.968	200.178
26	9	Marcos Ambrose	Richard Petty Motorsports	Ford	36.001	199.994
27	14	Austin Dillon	Stewart–Haas Racing	Chevrolet	36.003	199.983
28	10	Danica Patrick	Stewart–Haas Racing	Chevrolet	36.056	199.989
29	1	Jamie McMurray	Earnhardt Ganassi Racing	Chevrolet	36.087	199.518
30	47	Bobby Labonte	JTG Daugherty Racing	Toyota	36.212	198.829
31	5	Kasey Kahne	Hendrick Motorsports	Chevrolet	36.381	197.906
32	95	Scott Speed	Leavine Family Racing	Ford	36.418	197.704
33	13	Casey Mears	Germain Racing	Ford	36.424	197.672
34	32	Timmy Hill	FAS Lane Racing	Ford	36.543	197.028
35	36	J. J. Yeley	Tommy Baldwin Racing	Chevrolet	36.546	197.012
36	30	David Stremme	Swan Racing	Toyota	36.552	196.980
37	87	Joe Nemechek	NEMCO-Jay Robinson Racing	Toyota	36.582	196.818
38	93	Travis Kvapil	BK Racing	Toyota	36.707	196.148
39	51	Brendan Gaughan	Phoenix Racing	Chevrolet	36.795	195.679
40	35	Josh Wise	Front Row Motorsports	Ford	36.808	195.610
41	98	Johnny Sauter	Phil Parsons Racing	Chevrolet	36.889	195.180
42	7	Dave Blaney	Tommy Baldwin Racing	Chevrolet	37.010	194.542
43	33	Landon Cassill	Circle Sport	Chevrolet	37.378	192.627

=== Race results ===
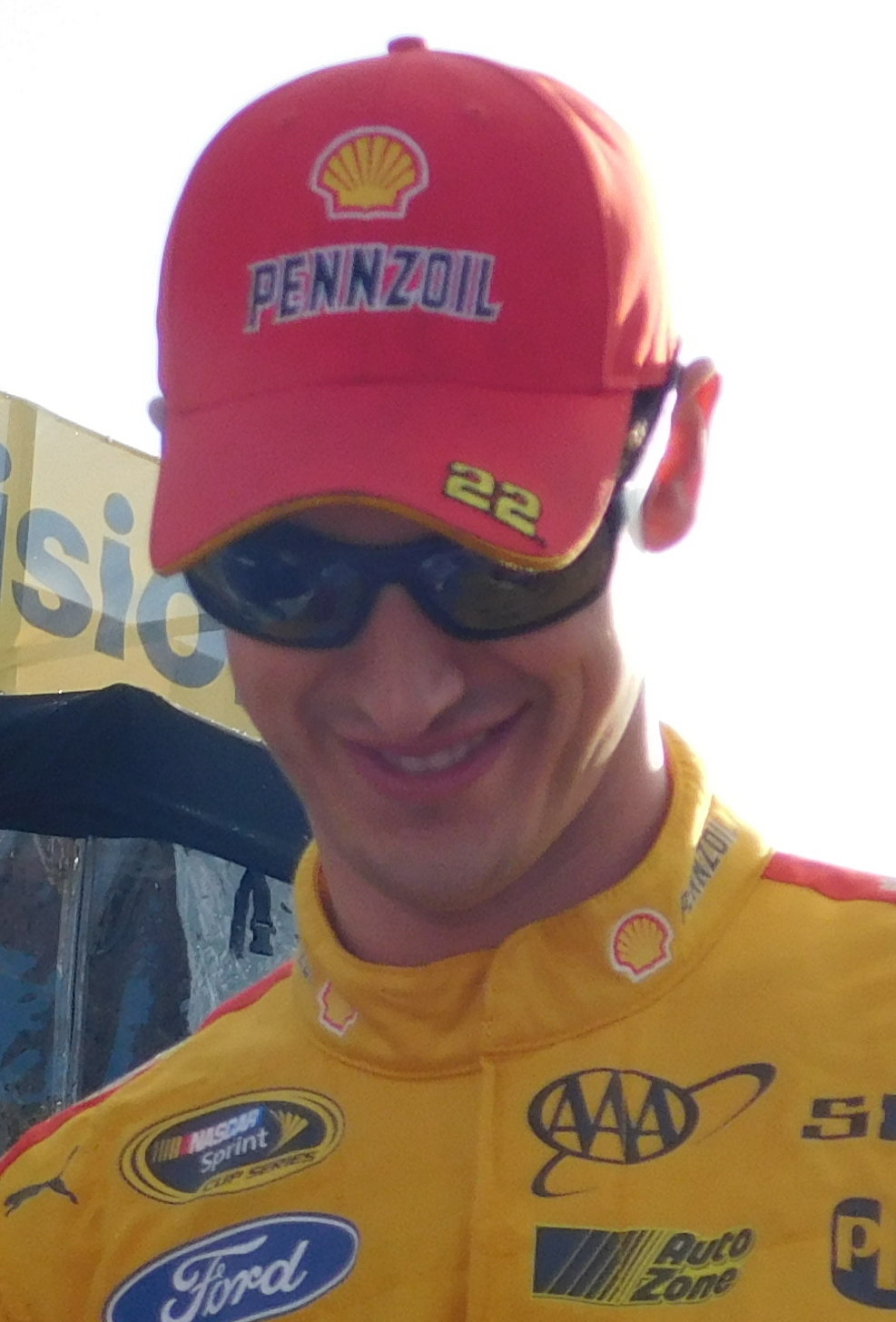
Joey Logano won the race from the pole position.

Pos	No.	Driver	Team	Manufacturer	Laps	Led	Points^{1}
1	22	Joey Logano	Penske Racing	Ford	200	51	48
2	29	Kevin Harvick	Richard Childress Racing	Chevrolet	200	0	42
3	78	Kurt Busch	Furniture Row Racing	Chevrolet	200	43	42
4	27	Paul Menard	Richard Childress Racing	Chevrolet	200	0	40
5	15	Clint Bowyer	Michael Waltrip Racing	Toyota	200	0	39
6	9	Marcos Ambrose	Richard Petty Motorsports	Ford	200	1	39
7	5	Kasey Kahne	Hendrick Motorsports	Chevrolet	200	0	37
8	31	Jeff Burton	Richard Childress Racing	Chevrolet	200	0	36
9	16	Greg Biffle	Roush Fenway Racing	Ford	200	28	36
10	99	Carl Edwards	Roush Fenway Racing	Ford	200	0	34
11	42	Juan Pablo Montoya	Earnhardt Ganassi Racing	Chevrolet	200	0	33
12	2	Brad Keselowski	Penske Racing	Ford	200	17	33
13	39	Ryan Newman	Stewart–Haas Racing	Chevrolet	200	0	31
14	14	Austin Dillon	Stewart–Haas Racing	Chevrolet	200	0	0^{[2]}
15	20	Matt Kenseth	Joe Gibbs Racing	Toyota	200	0	29
16	56	Martin Truex Jr.	Michael Waltrip Racing	Toyota	200	0	28
17	24	Jeff Gordon	Hendrick Motorsports	Chevrolet	200	0	27
18	43	Aric Almirola	Richard Petty Motorsports	Ford	200	0	26
19	17	Ricky Stenhouse Jr.	Roush Fenway Racing	Ford	200	0	25
20	11	Denny Hamlin	Joe Gibbs Racing	Toyota	200	9	25
21	21	Trevor Bayne	Wood Brothers Racing	Ford	200	1	0^{[2]}
22	1	Jamie McMurray	Earnhardt Ganassi Racing	Chevrolet	200	0	22
23	10	Danica Patrick	Stewart–Haas Racing	Chevrolet	200	0	21
24	34	David Ragan	Front Row Motorsports	Ford	200	1	21
25	13	Casey Mears	Germain Racing	Ford	200	2	20
26	30	David Stremme	Swan Racing	Toyota	200	0	18
27	55	Mark Martin	Michael Waltrip Racing	Toyota	199	23	18
28	93	Travis Kvapil	BK Racing	Toyota	198	0	16
29	32	Timmy Hill	FAS Lane Racing	Ford	198	0	15
30	7	Dave Blaney	Tommy Baldwin Racing	Chevrolet	197	0	14
31	18	Kyle Busch	Joe Gibbs Racing	Toyota	197	0	13
32	33	Landon Cassill	Circle Sport	Chevrolet	197	0	0^{[2]}
33	51	Brendan Gaughan	Phoenix Racing	Chevrolet	196	0	0^{[2]}
34	87	Joe Nemechek	NEMCO-Jay Robinson Racing	Toyota	192	0	0^{[2]}
35	47	Bobby Labonte	JTG Daugherty Racing	Toyota	186	0	9
36	88	Dale Earnhardt Jr.	Hendrick Motorsports	Chevrolet	171	20	9
37	38	David Gilliland	Front Row Motorsports	Ford	165	1	8
38	83	David Reutimann	BK Racing	Toyota	153	0	6
39	35	Josh Wise	Front Row Motorsports	Ford	56	0	0^{[2]}
40	48	Jimmie Johnson	Hendrick Motorsports	Chevrolet	54	3	5
41	95	Scott Speed	Leavine Family Racing	Ford	35	0	3
42	98	Johnny Sauter	Phil Parsons Racing	Chevrolet	34	0	0^{[2]}
43	36	J. J. Yeley	Tommy Baldwin Racing	Chevrolet	12	0	1

Notes

- ^1 Points include 3 Chase for the Sprint Cup points for winning, 1 point for leading a lap, and 1 point for most laps led.
- ^{a} ^{b} ^{c} ^{d} Ineligible for driver's championship points.

== Standings after the race ==
Drivers' Championship standings

Pos	Driver	Points
1	Jimmie Johnson	813
2	Clint Bowyer	772 (-41)
3	Carl Edwards	762 (-51)
4	Kevin Harvick	749 (-64)
5	Kyle Busch	706 (-107)

Manufacturers' Championship standings

Pos	Manufacturer	Points
1	Chevrolet	162
2	Toyota	148 (-14)
3	Ford	120 (-42)

- Note: Only the first twelve positions are included for the driver standings.

Previous race: 2013 Cheez-It 355 at The Glen	Sprint Cup Series; 2013 season	Next race: 2013 Irwin Tools Night Race
