= Phil Parsons Racing =

Former NASCAR team

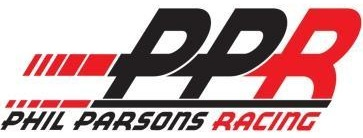
- Owner: Phil Parsons
- Base: Mooresville, North Carolina
- Series: Sprint Cup Series; Nationwide Series
- Race drivers: Phil Parsons; Johnny Chapman; Terry Cook; Dave Blaney; Danny O'Quinn, Jr. Michael McDowell; Josh Wise
- Manufacturer: Toyota (2009–2011, 2015); Ford (2012–2015); Chevrolet (2014–2015)
- Opened: 1991
- Closed: 2015

Career
- Debut: Sprint Cup Series: 2009 Daytona 500 (Daytona)
- Latest race: Sprint Cup Series: 2015 Ford EcoBoost 400 (Homestead-Miami Speedway)
- Races competed: 178
- Drivers' Championships: 0
- Race victories: 0
- Pole positions: 0

Phil Parsons Racing, formerly named MSRP Motorsports, Prism Motorsports, and later HP Racing, was a NASCAR team that competed in the Sprint Cup Series and Nationwide Series. It was owned by former NASCAR driver Phil Parsons, and most recently fielded the No. 98 Ford for Josh Wise.

The team was formerly owned by Phil's wife Marcia as well as Randy and Stacey Humphrey (hence the original name MSRP: Marcia, Stacey, Randy, Phil). For the first few years of its Nationwide Series and Sprint Cup operations, the team was infamous for being a start and park organization, meaning that the team qualified a car for races, but eventually parked it after just a few laps to avoid the costs of running a full race, even though the car was perfectly able to continue on. The bad publicity generated by the practice led to Phil Parsons's refusal to answer questions about MSRP in 2008, but subsequently Parsons justified the practice by saying that "we furnished a living for some families, so there was some good that came out of it." In 2009, MSRP continued with two Nationwide Series teams and finally finished a race, while it also added a Sprint Cup team under the Prism Motorsports name that qualified for 30 races but only finished two. After the season, the entire team became known as Prism Motorsports.

In 2010, the team had two Sprint Cup teams, No. 55 and No. 66, led by drivers Michael McDowell and Dave Blaney, which fielded Toyota Camrys under a technical alliance with MWR. Three drivers rotated among the two Nationwide Series cars (90 and 91) in 2010: Danny O'Quinn Jr., David Gilliland, and Chase Miller.

Car No. 55 crew chief Zach McGowan tweeted on November 18 that the team would be shutting down after the 2010 season-ending race at Homestead, But this was denied by team owner Randy Humphrey. No information was available regarding PRISM's Nationwide teams. The team returned in 2011 as HP Racing with McDowell behind the wheel of the No. 66 Toyota with Gene Nead as crew chief. Unlike 2009, the team intended to run a limited schedule, running only a few full races but ended up running the full schedule. The team ran with Ford for 2012 and 2013 before switching to Chevrolet for the 2014 season.

The team and driver Josh Wise gained popularity in 2014 after an internet campaign with Dogecoin and Reddit, leading the No. 98 to be voted into the 2014 NASCAR Sprint All-Star Race.

== Sprint Cup Series ==
=== Car No. 55 history ===
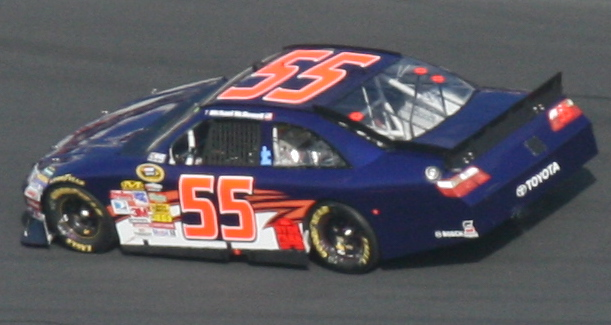
Michael McDowell in the No. 55 during the 2010 Coca-Cola 600

For 2010, Prism Motorsports added a second car provided by Michael Waltrip Racing, the No. 55, driven by former team driver Michael McDowell. The car number had previously been used by Michael Waltrip from 2007 to 2009. Randy Humphrey was listed as the car's official owner. At the start of the season, Prism had no sponsorship for this car. McDowell succeeded in qualifying the No. 55 into the starting field for the 2010 Daytona 500. After qualifying, McDowell said that this was the "biggest race of the season" for Prism, as the guaranteed winnings would enable the team to stay on the track for several weeks. McDowell qualified 29th, picked up sponsorship from South Carolina-based Firefly Vodka, and finished 33rd after a drive shaft issue. McDowell and teammate Dave Blaney swapped rides at Phoenix and Texas in an effort to get the team higher in owner points.

Michael Waltrip drove the No. 55 at Talladega with Aaron's sponsorship to a poor finish after getting caught up in a wreck, but was running up front and was at one point leading the race. Mike Bliss drove the car after McDowell left the team. When Terry Labonte's car failed to qualify at Richmond, he took over as the driver of the No. 55, taking sponsor Gander Mountain with him. Terry Cook later attempted to qualify the car at Martinsville, but failed to do so. Waltrip would later return, along with sponsor Aaron's to the No. 55 at the fall Talladega race.

The No. 55 car did not enter the fall Texas race, possibly because of the large number of entries attempting to qualify. It was also absent on the entry list for Homestead.

=== Car No. 55 results ===
NASCAR Sprint Cup Series results
Year	Driver	No.	Make	1	2	3	4	5	6	7	8	9	10	11	12	13	14	15	16	17	18	19	20	21	22	23	24	25	26	27	28	29	30	31	32	33	34	35	36	Owners	Pts
2010	Michael McDowell	55	Toyota	DAY; 33	CAL; 42	LVS; 42	ATL; 42		MAR; 43				RCH; DNQ	DAR; 40	DOV; 42	CLT; 42	POC; 39			NHA; 41	DAY; DNQ	CHI; DNQ	IND; 42	POC; 43	GLN; 42	MCH; 42	BRI; 43													43rd	1281
2010	Michael Waltrip	55	Toyota					BRI; 41				TAL; 39						MCH; DNQ	SON; DNQ																	TAL; 28	TEX			43rd	1281
2010	Dave Blaney	55	Toyota							PHO; 42	TEX; 43																													43rd	1281
2010	Mike Bliss	55	Toyota																									ATL; 42	RCH; QL	NHA; 41	DOV; 40	KAN; DNQ	CAL; DNQ	CLT; DNQ				PHO; 39	HOM	43rd	1281
2010	Terry Labonte	55	Toyota																										RCH; 40											43rd	1281
2010	Terry Cook	55	Toyota																																MAR; DNQ					43rd	1281

=== Car No. 98 history ===
==== 2009–2010: Prism Motorsports ====
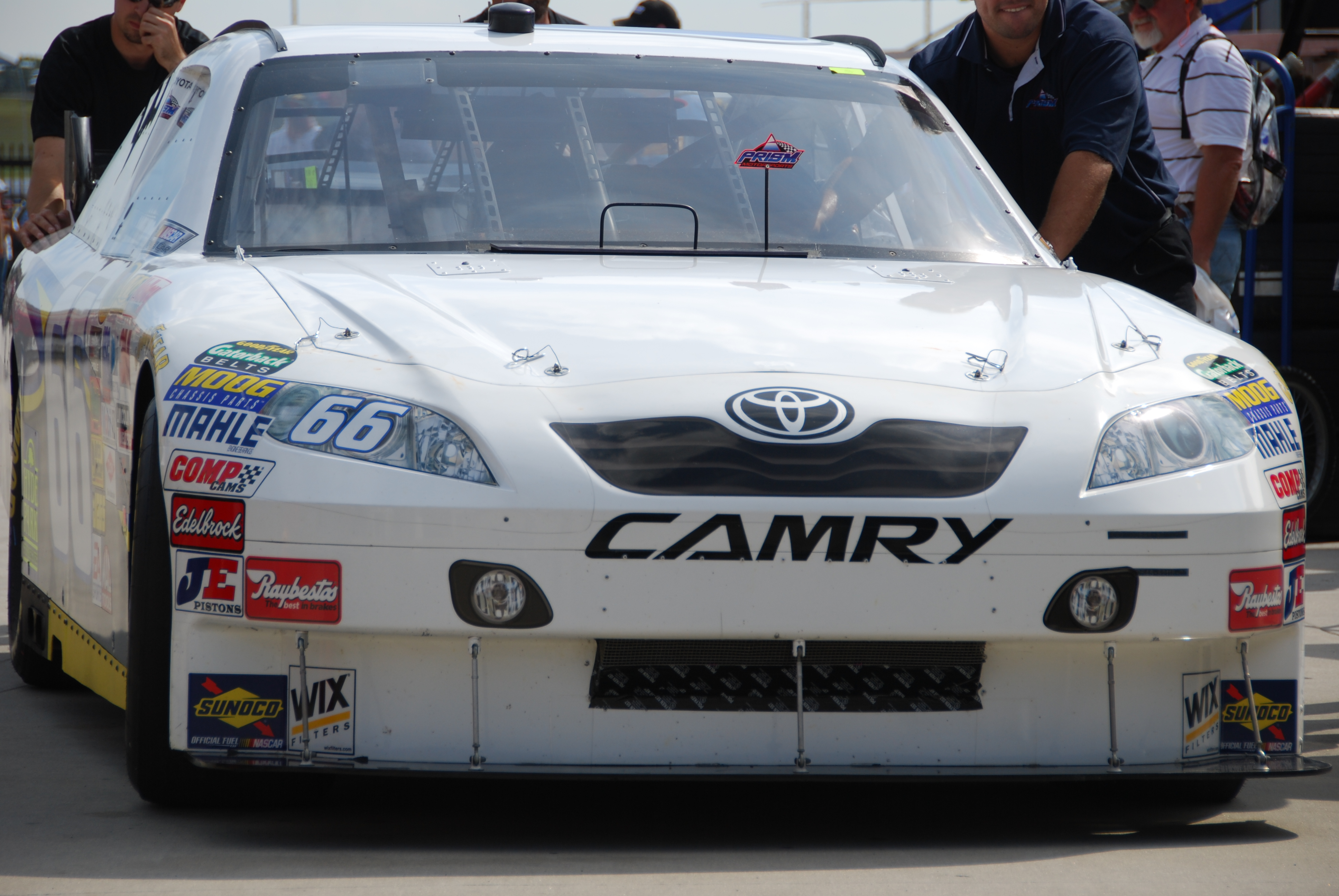
The No. 66 at Atlanta Motor Speedway in 2009

The No. 98 car was a NASCAR Sprint Cup Series team that debuted in 2009 as the No. 66 under a technical alliance with MWR, which supplied the team's Toyota Camry, engines and technical support. Terry Labonte ran the No. 66 for the 2009 Daytona 500, where he finished 24th. Dave Blaney ran the rest of the season, except for the Aarons 499 at Talladega as he was away with his family. Michael McDowell attempted to qualify for the event but failed to do so. According to Blaney, Prism had anticipated attempting to run all of the laps in "six or eight" Sprint Cup races in which the team was able to secure full sponsorship, which included Window World for the Daytona 500 and Aaron's for the Coca-Cola 600. The Denny Hamlin Foundation was on the car at Lowes Motor Speedway, Talladega, and Texas, with Blaney only making the race at Talladega. Ultimately, the team qualified for 31 of the 36 Sprint Cup races in the 2009 season – 30 by Blaney and 1 by Labonte—but only ran two complete races (the Daytona 500 and the Coca-Cola 600). For the remainder of 2009, the No. 66 car was a start-and-park team, much like their Nationwide Series counterparts.

Blaney returned to the No. 66 in 2010. Again, Prism struggled with sponsorship, as it was unable to find a sponsor for the team for even the 2010 Daytona 500, and Blaney subsequently failed to qualify for it. Blaney made the team's first race of the year in the 2010 Auto Club 500, qualifying fifth, leading four laps before finishing 41st. The 66 was later impounded by NASCAR. The team was able to rebound from the impound, and ran the whole entire race, finishing 29th at the Shelby American. Blaney left the team after Watkins Glen, and Scott Riggs took over the No. 66 for the next four races, qualifying only once at Bristol Motor Speedway, Likewise, Jason Leffler drove the No. 66 for four races, only qualifying at Auto Club Speedway. Johnny Sauter failed to make each of the three races he attempted with the team, and Mike Bliss drove the car at Texas and Homestead.

While the 66 team frequently start-and-parked, it occasionally showed competitive speed. Blaney qualified 8th, 4th, and 3rd at the 2009 Food City 500, the 2009 Sharpie 500, and the 2010 Food City 500, respectively (all at Bristol), as well as a 5th place start spot at the 2009 Auto Club 500, though the team finished 41st or worst in all four races.

==== 2011: HP Racing ====
For 2011, McDowell returned to the team, now renamed HP Racing. The team missed the 2011 Daytona 500, but started and parked the next three races. HP ran its first full race at Martinsville, where the team finished 32nd after a late wreck. KLOVE sponsored the team at Richmond and Darlington. Todd Bodine drove at both Pocono and Michigan in August, while Josh Wise took over the 66 at Texas while McDowell filled in for Kyle Busch, who was suspended for intentionally wrecking another driver during the Truck Series race.

==== 2012–2015: PPR with Mike Curb ====
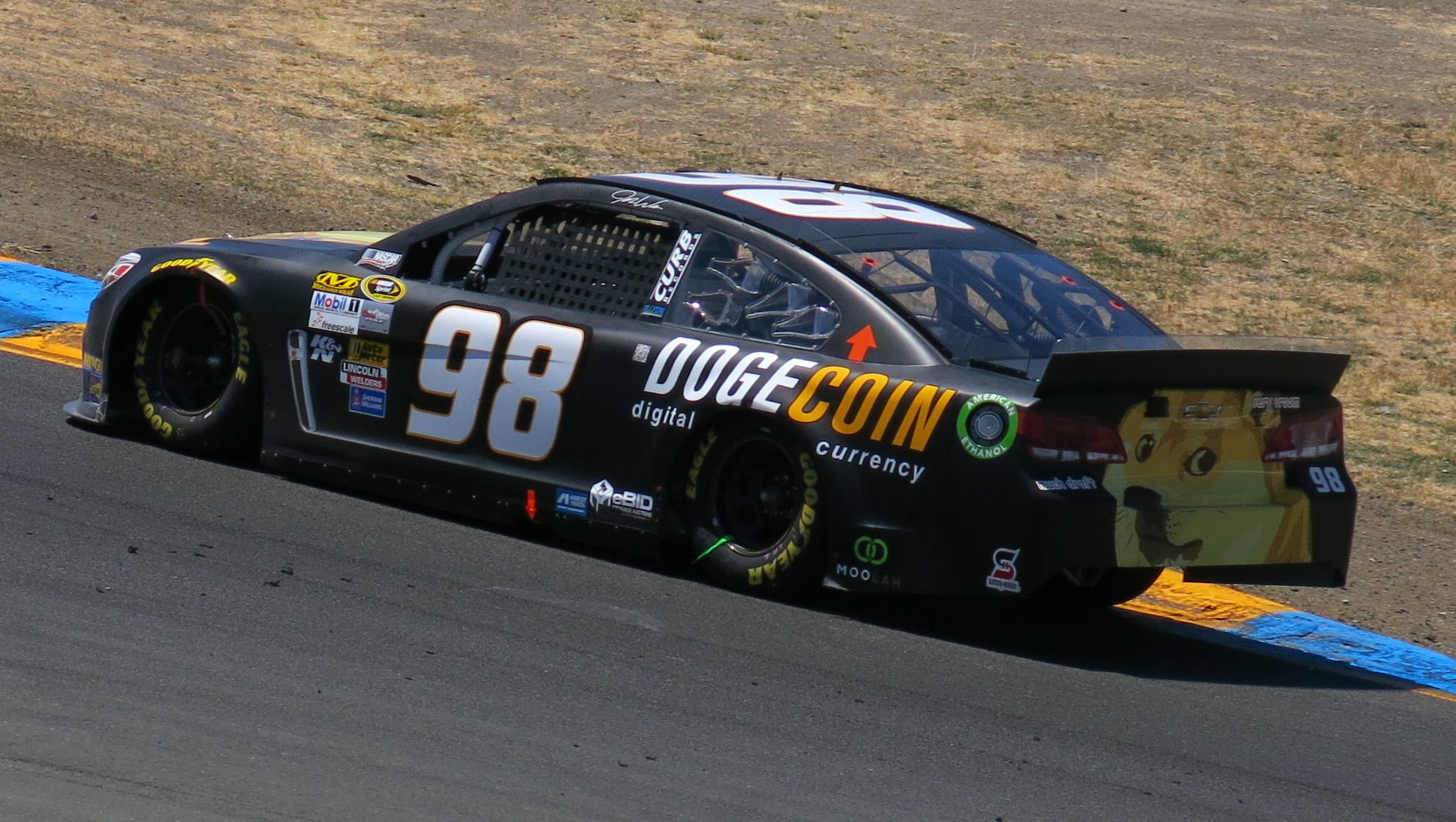
Josh Wise in the No. 98 at Sonoma Raceway in 2014

For 2012, McDowell returned to the team, renamed Phil Parsons Racing. The team also merged with Whitney Motorsports and partnered with entertainment icon Mike Curb. The team ran Fords with Roush Yates Engines and used the number 98 to honor the memory of Benny Parsons. Phil Parsons Racing planned to run the first 5 races in their entirety with the hope of cracking the top 35. The 98 raced their way into the Daytona 500, with sponsorship from Curb Records and Christian radio station KLOVE. McDowell finished 30th after starting 11th in the 2012 Daytona 500. McDowell ran all but six races during the season, failing to qualify for three of them.

The team opened the 2013 season with a ninth-place finish at the Daytona 500, the first top ten finish for the team and for McDowell. Phil Parsons Racing withdrew from Phoenix after the team could not prepare the Generation 6 cars in time. They would later skip the road courses as well. Johnny Sauter raced 2 races because McDowell was not in the car. Mike Curb is listed as the owner of the 98. McDowell left after the 2013 season and Josh Wise took over as the team switched to Chevrolet for all but the superspeedway events, where they used Fords. In March 2014, Reddit users started a fundraiser to raise Dogecoin to sponsor the No. 98 at the Aaron's 499. On March 25, Reddit user Reddit_Racing announced that the fundraiser was a success, having met their $50,000 goal by accumulating 67 million Dogecoin. Florida gubernatorial candidate and Democrat Charlie Crist was to sponsor the No. 98 for the July 5 Coke Zero 400 at Daytona, the sponsorship provided by former owner James Finch, but was withdrawn by Parsons to respect his business partner Mike Curb, a Republican.

Wise returned to PPR for the 2015 season. Finch would once again provide sponsorship to the team in the Daytona 500, this time through his company Phoenix Construction. However, the car suffered a terminal mechanical failure before the green flag flew on their Budweiser Duel, and PPR ultimately missed the Daytona 500 for the first time since 2011. However, the team has been able to qualify for every race since then. Wise scored a top 10 in the 2015 GEICO 500 at Talladega.

Before the 2015 Coca-Cola 600, Parsons and Curb sold the team's assets and Wise's contract to Premium Motorsports and the team shut down.

=== Car No. 98 results ===
NASCAR Sprint Cup Series results
Year	Driver	No.	Make	1	2	3	4	5	6	7	8	9	10	11	12	13	14	15	16	17	18	19	20	21	22	23	24	25	26	27	28	29	30	31	32	33	34	35	36	Owners	Pts
2009	Terry Labonte	66	Toyota	DAY; 24																																				42nd	1435
2009	Dave Blaney	66	Toyota		CAL; 42	LVS; DNQ	ATL; 41	BRI; 43	MAR; 42	TEX; 43	PHO; 42		RCH; 43	DAR; 41	CLT; 28	DOV; 39	POC; 40	MCH; 40	SON; 42	NHA; 42	DAY; 43	CHI; 43	IND; 42	POC; 40	GLN; 42	MCH; 42	BRI; 43	ATL; 43	RCH; 43	NHA; 42	DOV; 37	KAN; 40	CAL; 41	CLT; DNQ	MAR; 40	TAL; 41	TEX; DNQ	PHO; 42	HOM; DNQ	42nd	1435
2009	Michael McDowell	66	Toyota									TAL; DNQ																												42nd	1435
2010	Dave Blaney	66	Toyota	DAY; DNQ	CAL; 41	LVS; 29	ATL; 41	BRI; 42	MAR; 42			TAL; 43	RCH; DNQ	DAR; 42	DOV; 41	CLT; 43	POC; 40	MCH; DNQ	SON; 37	NHA; 42	DAY; 43	CHI; DNQ	IND; 41	POC; 42	GLN; DNQ															44th	1241
2010	Michael McDowell	66	Toyota							PHO; 43	TEX; 41																													44th	1241
2010	Scott Riggs	66	Toyota																							MCH; DNQ	BRI; 42	ATL; DNQ	RCH; DNQ											44th	1241
2010	Johnny Sauter	66	Toyota																											NHA; DNQ					MAR; DNQ	TAL; DNQ				44th	1241
2010	Ted Musgrave	66	Toyota																												DOV; DNQ									44th	1241
2010	Jason Leffler	66	Toyota																													KAN; DNQ	CAL; 43	CLT; DNQ				PHO; DNQ		44th	1241
2010	Mike Bliss	66	Toyota																																		TEX; 39		HOM; 43	44th	1241
2011	Michael McDowell	66	Toyota	DAY; DNQ	PHO; 41	LVS; 41	BRI; 43	CAL; 43	MAR; 32	TEX; 40	TAL; DNQ	RCH; 40	DAR; 43	DOV; 43	CLT; 39	KAN; 41	POC; 41	MCH; 43	SON; 30	DAY; 42	KEN; 41	NHA; 40	IND; 37		GLN; 41		BRI; 39	ATL; 41	RCH; 39	CHI; 43	NHA; 37	DOV; 40	KAN; 39	CLT; 39	TAL; 40	MAR; 39		PHO; 40	HOM; 43	41st	144
2011	Todd Bodine	66	Toyota																					POC; 37		MCH; 39														41st	144
2011	Josh Wise	66	Toyota																																		TEX; 40			41st	144
2012	Michael McDowell	98	Ford	DAY; 30	PHO; 43	LVS; 38	BRI; 31	CAL; 38	MAR; 40	TEX; 41	KAN; 40	RCH; 39	TAL; 43	DAR; DNQ	CLT; 36	DOV; 42	POC; 34	MCH; 38		KEN; 38	DAY; 43	NHA; 40	IND; DNQ		GLN; 37		BRI; 23	ATL; DNQ	RCH; 41	CHI; 43	NHA; 37	DOV; 38	TAL; 31	CLT; 31	KAN; 43	MAR; 39	TEX; 38	PHO; 38	HOM; 41	39th	199
2012	David Mayhew	98	Ford																SON; 40																					39th	199
2012	Mike Skinner	98	Ford																					POC; 41		MCH; 39														39th	199
2013	Michael McDowell	98	Ford	DAY; 9	PHO; Wth	LVS; 43	BRI; 42	CAL; 42	MAR; 43	TEX; 43	KAN; 42	RCH; 41	TAL; 21	DAR; 42	CLT; 42	DOV; 42	POC; 40	MCH; 42	SON	KEN; 38	DAY; 42	NHA; 42	IND; 32	POC; 40	GLN		BRI; 41	ATL; 42	RCH; 43	CHI; 43		DOV; 43	KAN; 38	CLT; 40	TAL; 15	MAR; 26	TEX; 43	PHO; 32	HOM; 43	42nd	194
2013	Johnny Sauter	98	Ford																							MCH; 42					NHA; 42									42nd	194
2014	Josh Wise	98	Ford	DAY; 24									TAL; 20				POC; 35				DAY; 23														TAL; 28					37th	405
2014	Josh Wise	98	Chevy		PHO; DNQ	LVS; 42	BRI; 23	CAL; 37	MAR; 35	TEX; 36	DAR; 21	RCH; 39		KAN; 33	CLT; 41	DOV; 28		MCH; 33	SON; 40	KEN; 29		NHA; 29	IND; 29	POC; 24	GLN; 38	MCH; 28	BRI; 29	ATL; 33	RCH; 32	CHI; 33	NHA; 33	DOV; 42	KAN; 38	CLT; 41		MAR; 25	TEX; 41	PHO; 41	HOM; 32	37th	405
2015	Josh Wise	98	Ford	DAY; DNQ	ATL; 32	LVS; 34	PHO; 36	CAL; 36	MAR; 30	TEX; 38	BRI; 39	RCH; 42	TAL; 10	KAN; 28	CLT; 35	DOV; 40	POC; 29	MCH; 34		DAY; 31	KEN; 43																			39th	309
2015	Josh Wise	98	Chevy																SON; 28																					39th	309
2015	Timmy Hill	98	Ford																			NHA; 38	IND; 41				BRI; 39													39th	309
2015	Timmy Hill	98	Chevy																						GLN; 38	MCH; 43														39th	309
2015	Reed Sorenson	98	Chevy																					POC; 34																39th	309
2015	Reed Sorenson	98	Ford																										RCH; 41	CHI; 40		DOV; 33	CLT; 35	KAN; 38						39th	309
2015	T. J. Bell	98	Ford																									DAR; 37												39th	309
2015	Ryan Preece	98	Chevy																												NHA; 32						TEX; 36		HOM; 38	39th	309
2015	Ryan Preece	98	Ford																																	MAR; 42		PHO; 37		39th	309
2015	Michael Waltrip	98	Toyota																																TAL; 13					39th	309

== See also ==
- D'Hondt Humphrey Motorsports
