= 2014 Aaron's 499 =

Race details
- Race 10 of 36 in the 2014 NASCAR Sprint Cup Series
- Talladega Superspeedway
- Date: May 4, 2014
- Location: Talladega Superspeedway in Talladega, Alabama
- Course: Permanent racing facility
- Course length: 2.66 miles (4.28 km)
- Distance: 188 laps, 500.08 mi (804.8 km)
- Weather: Clear blue skies 81 °F (27 °C); wind out of the WSW at 7 miles per hour (11 km/h)
- Average speed: 152.103 mph (244.786 km/h)

Pole position
Driver	Brian Scott	Richard Childress Racing
- Time: 48.293

Most laps led
Driver	Greg Biffle	Roush Fenway Racing
- Laps: 58

Winner
No. 11	Denny Hamlin	Joe Gibbs Racing

Television in the United States
- Network: Fox & MRN
- Announcers: Mike Joy, Darrell Waltrip and Larry McReynolds (Television); Joe Moore and Barney Hall (Booth); Dave Moody (1 & 2), Mike Bagley (Backstretch) and Jeff Striegle (3 & 4) (Turns) (Radio)
- Nielsen ratings: 4.4/9 (Final); 4.0/8 (Overnight); 6.9 Million viewers

The 2014 Aaron's 499 was a NASCAR Sprint Cup Series stock car race run on May 4, 2014, at Talladega Superspeedway in Lincoln, Alabama. Contested over 188 laps on the 2.66 miles (4.28 km) tri-oval, it was the tenth race of the 2014 NASCAR Sprint Cup Series. Denny Hamlin won the race, his first points paying win at a restrictor plate track, and joined a list of drivers to win in their 300th start, while Greg Biffle finished second and Clint Bowyer, Brian Vickers, and A. J. Allmendinger rounded out the top five. The top rookies of the race were Kyle Larson (9th), Austin Dillon (15th), and Michael Annett (16th). This was the last race for the sponsor Aaron's

== Report ==
=== Entry list ===
The entry list for the Aaron's 499 was released on Monday, April 28, 2014 at 1:11 p.m. Eastern time. Forty-seven drivers were entered for the race.

No.	Driver	Team	Manufacturer
1	Jamie McMurray	Chip Ganassi Racing	Chevrolet
2	Brad Keselowski (PC2)	Team Penske	Ford
3	Austin Dillon (R)	Richard Childress Racing	Chevrolet
4	Kevin Harvick	Stewart–Haas Racing	Chevrolet
5	Kasey Kahne	Hendrick Motorsports	Chevrolet
7	Michael Annett (R)	Tommy Baldwin Racing	Chevrolet
9	Marcos Ambrose	Richard Petty Motorsports	Ford
10	Danica Patrick	Stewart–Haas Racing	Chevrolet
11	Denny Hamlin	Joe Gibbs Racing	Toyota
13	Casey Mears	Germain Racing	Chevrolet
14	Tony Stewart (PC3)	Stewart–Haas Racing	Chevrolet
15	Clint Bowyer	Michael Waltrip Racing	Toyota
16	Greg Biffle	Roush Fenway Racing	Ford
17	Ricky Stenhouse Jr.	Roush Fenway Racing	Ford
18	Kyle Busch	Joe Gibbs Racing	Toyota
20	Matt Kenseth (PC5)	Joe Gibbs Racing	Toyota
21	Trevor Bayne (i)	Wood Brothers Racing	Ford
22	Joey Logano	Team Penske	Ford
23	Alex Bowman (R)	BK Racing	Toyota
24	Jeff Gordon (PC6)	Hendrick Motorsports	Chevrolet
26	Cole Whitt (R)	BK Racing	Toyota
27	Paul Menard	Richard Childress Racing	Chevrolet
31	Ryan Newman	Richard Childress Racing	Chevrolet
32	Terry Labonte (PC7)	Go FAS Racing	Ford
33	Brian Scott (i)	Circle Sport	Chevrolet
34	David Ragan	Front Row Motorsports	Ford
35	Eric McClure (i)	Front Row Motorsports	Ford
36	Reed Sorenson	Tommy Baldwin Racing	Chevrolet
38	David Gilliland	Front Row Motorsports	Ford
40	Landon Cassill (i)	Circle Sport	Chevrolet
41	Kurt Busch (PC4)	Stewart–Haas Racing	Chevrolet
42	Kyle Larson (R)	Chip Ganassi Racing	Chevrolet
43	Aric Almirola	Richard Petty Motorsports	Ford
44	J. J. Yeley (i)	Xxxtreme Motorsports	Chevrolet
47	A. J. Allmendinger	JTG Daugherty Racing	Chevrolet
48	Jimmie Johnson (PC1)	Hendrick Motorsports	Chevrolet
51	Justin Allgaier (R)	HScott Motorsports	Chevrolet
55	Brian Vickers	Michael Waltrip Racing	Toyota
66	Michael Waltrip	Michael Waltrip Racing	Toyota
77	Dave Blaney	Randy Humphrey Racing	Ford
78	Martin Truex Jr.	Furniture Row Racing	Chevrolet
83	Ryan Truex (R)	BK Racing	Toyota
87	Joe Nemechek (i)	NEMCO Motorsports	Toyota
88	Dale Earnhardt Jr.	Hendrick Motorsports	Chevrolet
95	Michael McDowell	Leavine Family Racing	Ford
98	Josh Wise	Phil Parsons Racing	Chevrolet
99	Carl Edwards	Roush Fenway Racing	Ford
Official entry list

Key	Meaning
(R)	Rookie
(i)	Ineligible for points
(PC#)	Past champions provisional

== Practice ==
=== First practice ===
Martin Truex Jr. was the fastest in first practice with a time of 47.708 and a speed of 200.721 mph (323.029 km/h). Marcos Ambrose had to go to a backup car after an unusual incident.

Pos	No.	Driver	Team	Manufacturer	Time	Speed
1	78	Martin Truex Jr.	Furniture Row Racing	Chevrolet	47.708	200.721
2	51	Justin Allgaier (R)	HScott Motorsports	Chevrolet	47.721	200.666
3	34	David Ragan	Front Row Motorsports	Ford	47.737	200.599
Official first practice results

=== Final practice ===
Trevor Bayne was the fastest in final practice with a time of 48.117 and a speed of 199.015 mph (320.284 km/h).

Pos	No.	Driver	Team	Manufacturer	Time	Speed
1	21	Trevor Bayne (i)	Wood Brothers Racing	Ford	48.117	199.015
2	99	Carl Edwards	Roush Fenway Racing	Ford	48.129	198.965
3	14	Tony Stewart	Stewart–Haas Racing	Chevrolet	48.142	198.912
Official final practice results

== Qualifying ==
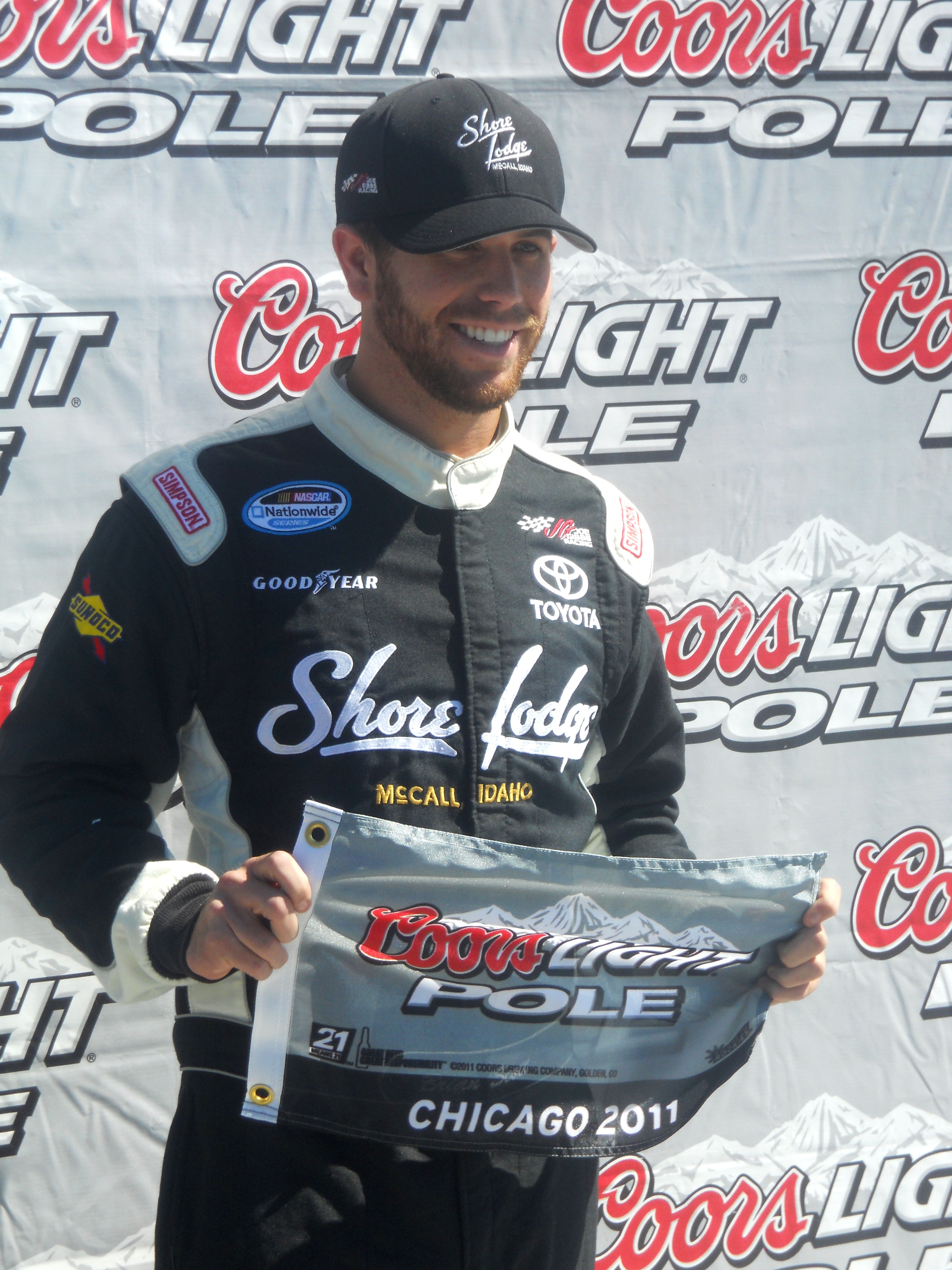
Brian Scott scored the pole position.

Three rounds of Knockout Qualifying took place, the first instance that the new qualifying format was used in the Sprint Cup Series on a super speedway. Brian Scott captured his first career pole with a time of 48.293 and a speed of 198.290 mph (319.117 km/h). Paul Menard, A. J. Allmendinger, Casey Mears and Austin Dillon rounded out the top five. The drivers had a wide range of opinions on the new format. "I don't know if anybody can really quite capture how intense that is. I'm telling you, it's just nerve-racking. You're trying to make all the right decisions as well as not wreck. It wasn't too crazy, but it was crazy enough to be fun," said Jeff Gordon. "It's hard because everybody wants to lag and nobody wants to go because the speed is at the back and not the front," said Brad Keselowski. Dale Earnhardt Jr. did not like the new format at Talladega. "It just wasn't much fun. I'd like to do some heat races or something maybe. That would be a little funner than this." Kasey Kahne and Truex Jr. started at the rear of the field after failing post-qualifying inspection. Kahne's car was too light and Truex's car failed to meet height requirements. "Basically we had a malfunction with a ballast container," Kahne's crew chief Kenny Francis said in a manufacturer release. "The cap that holds the ballast in came out. It could be mechanical or human error we are not really sure what happened. At the end of the day 25 pounds of ballast came out and we were 25 pounds light at the scales. The time was disallowed and we will have to start at the back." Dave Blaney, Eric McClure, Joe Nemechek and J. J. Yeley failed to qualify for the race.

=== Qualifying results ===
Pos	No.	Driver	Team	Manufacturer	R1	R2	R3
1	33	Brian Scott	Richard Childress Racing	Chevrolet	48.318	48.631	48.293
2	27	Paul Menard	Richard Childress Racing	Chevrolet	48.297	48.834	48.391
3	47	A. J. Allmendinger	JTG Daugherty Racing	Chevrolet	48.335	48.670	48.436
4	13	Casey Mears	Germain Racing	Chevrolet	48.323	48.695	48.518
5	3	Austin Dillon (R)	Richard Childress Racing	Chevrolet	48.341	48.714	48.520
6	31	Ryan Newman	Richard Childress Racing	Chevrolet	48.360	48.729	48.536
7	10	Danica Patrick	Stewart–Haas Racing	Chevrolet	48.106	48.856	49.109
8	4	Kevin Harvick	Stewart–Haas Racing	Chevrolet	48.038	48.771	49.261
9	41	Kurt Busch	Stewart–Haas Racing	Chevrolet	48.136	48.855	49.458
10	99	Carl Edwards	Roush Fenway Racing	Ford	48.372	48.688	49.459
11	24	Jeff Gordon	Hendrick Motorsports	Chevrolet	48.161	48.775	49.492
12	14	Tony Stewart (Note: Driver started at the rear of the field, after making unapproved adjustments.)	Stewart–Haas Racing	Chevrolet	48.048	48.763	50.678
13	2	Brad Keselowski	Team Penske	Ford	47.936	49.117	—
14	95	Michael McDowell	Leavine Family Racing	Ford	47.925	49.118	—
15	43	Aric Almirola	Richard Petty Motorsports	Ford	48.298	49.130	—
16	22	Joey Logano	Team Penske	Ford	47.839	49.138	—
17	5	Kasey Kahne (Note: Kasey Kahne started at the rear of the field, after his car was found to be underweight in post-qualifying inspection.)	Hendrick Motorsports	Chevrolet	0.000	0.000	—
18	7	Michael Annett (R)	Tommy Baldwin Racing	Chevrolet	48.368	49.336	—
19	55	Brian Vickers	Michael Waltrip Racing	Toyota	48.353	49.352	—
20	18	Kyle Busch (Note: Kyle Busch started at the rear of the field, after an engine change post-qualifying.)	Joe Gibbs Racing	Toyota	47.743	49.478	—
21	48	Jimmie Johnson	Hendrick Motorsports	Chevrolet	47.901	49.494	—
22	20	Matt Kenseth	Joe Gibbs Racing	Toyota	47.966	49.499	—
23	36	Reed Sorenson	Tommy Baldwin Racing	Chevrolet	48.383	50.165	—
24	21	Trevor Bayne	Wood Brothers Racing	Ford	48.286	50.248	—
25	83	Ryan Truex (R)	BK Racing	Toyota	48.385	—	—
26	17	Ricky Stenhouse Jr.	Roush Fenway Racing	Ford	48.386	—	—
27	9	Marcos Ambrose	Richard Childress Racing	Ford	48.404	—	—
28	15	Clint Bowyer	Michael Waltrip Racing	Toyota	48.411	—	—
29	66	Michael Waltrip	Identity Ventures Racing	Toyota	48.411	—	—
30	42	Kyle Larson (R)	Chip Ganassi Racing	Chevrolet	48.420	—	—
31	88	Dale Earnhardt Jr.	Hendrick Motorsports	Chevrolet	48.421	—	—
32	26	Cole Whitt (R)	BK Racing	Toyota	48.432	—	—
33	1	Jamie McMurray	Chip Ganassi Racing	Chevrolet	48.500	—	—
34	23	Alex Bowman (R)	BK Racing	Toyota	48.510	—	—
35	11	Denny Hamlin	Joe Gibbs Racing	Toyota	48.516	—	—
36	16	Greg Biffle	Roush Fenway Racing	Ford	48.549	—	—
37	98	Josh Wise	Phil Parsons Racing	Ford	48.602	—	—
38	78	Martin Truex Jr. (Note: Martin Truex Jr. started at the rear of the field, after his car did not meet height requirements.)	Furniture Row Racing	Chevrolet	0.000	—	—
39	32	Terry Labonte	Go FAS Racing	Ford	48.672	—	—
40	51	Justin Allgaier (R)	HScott Motorsports	Chevrolet	48.800	—	—
41	34	David Ragan	Front Row Motorsports	Ford	48.924	—	—
42	38	David Gilliland	Front Row Motorsports	Ford	49.138	—	—
43	40	Landon Cassill	Circle Sport	Chevrolet	49.262	—	—
Failed to qualify
44	77	Dave Blaney	Randy Humphrey Racing	Ford	48.967	—	—
45	87	Joe Nemechek	NEMCO Motorsports	Toyota	49.221	—	—
46	35	Eric McClure	Front Row Motorsports	Ford	49.268	—	—
47	44	J. J. Yeley	Xxxtreme Motorsports	Chevrolet	49.835	—	—
Official qualifying results

== Race ==
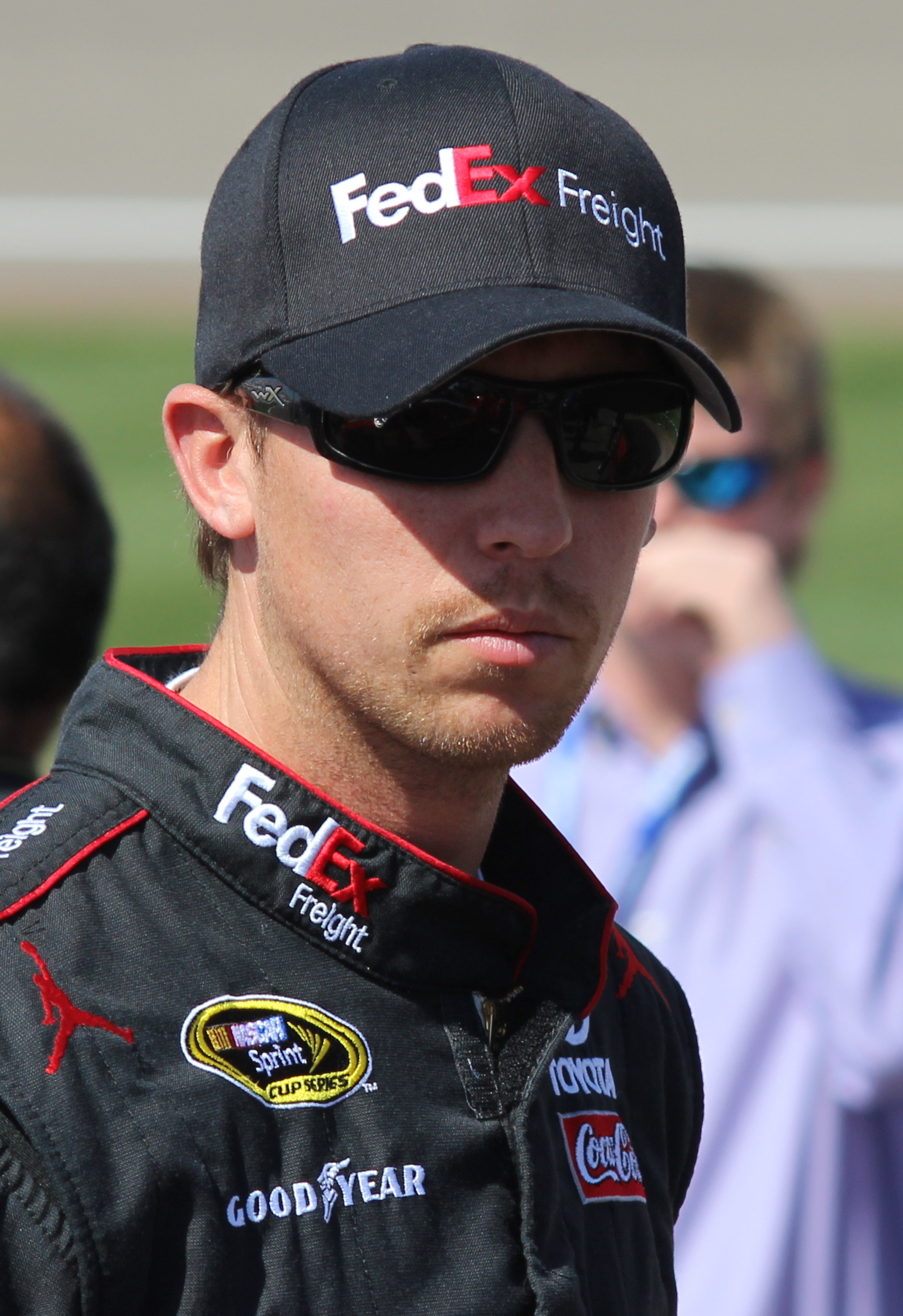
Denny Hamlin won the race.

Brian Scott led the field to the green flag at 1:20 p.m. Eastern time. He wouldn't lead a lap at all as his teammate Paul Menard took the lead with the stronger push coming from the inside line.

Leading the bottom line, Danica Patrick took the lead from Menard on lap six.

Jeff Gordon, who was pushing Patrick on the bottom, jumped to the middle line and assumed the lead on lap eight.

Danica took back the lead on lap nine.

Paul Menard found his way back to the front on lap 14.

Brad Keselowski jumped up to the middle in front of Gordon on lap 14, but as he tried to clear Danica, he got turned down into the paved runoff area going into turn 1. He saved it, but the car turned back up onto the track in turn 1 where he was about rammed in the rear by Trevor Bayne and Terry Labonte and cut down his right-front tire driving it through the grass. This would bring out the first caution of the race. “I’m not really sure what happened,’’ Keselowski said. “I made an aggressive move to take the lead and next thing I know I was spinning. Obviously, there was some kind of contact but I don’t know what happened.’’ “Danica made a mistake early,’’ Gordon said. “I don’t think that was an aggressive move. I think it was just a mistake that got (Keselowski) turned. She just misjudged him.’’ Landon Cassill stayed out to lead a lap before giving it back to Paul Menard.

The race restarted on lap 18.

Matt Kenseth took the lead on lap 20 riding the push from the high line.

Joey Logano used the inside line to take the lead on lap 21.

Denny Hamlin in the middle line took the lead on lap 32.

Carl Edwards used a push from the inside line to take the lead on lap 35.

Joey Logano, riding the bottom, took back the lead on lap 38.

Jimmie Johnson got a push from the middle line to take the lead on lap 41.

Logano took back the lead on lap 42.

Debris in turn 1 brought out the second caution of the race on lap 50. David Gilliland opted to stay out to lead a lap before handing over to Kyle Busch.

The race restarted on lap 55. Joey Logano jumped to the bottom line in front of Kyle to take back the lead.

Greg Biffle rode the bottom to take the lead on lap 57.

Jimmie Johnson used the middle line to retake the lead on lap 59.

Biffle was pushed back to the lead on lap 60.

Greg hit pit road on lap 95 to make his scheduled stop and handed the lead to teammate Carl Edwards.

Edwards made his stop on lap 96. Michael McDowell took the lead exiting pit road. He was not up to speed when Greg Biffle zipped right by him on the backstretch to take back the lead on lap 97.

The third caution flew on lap 106 after the cover to one of the backstretch caution lights was blown off. David Ragan stayed out to lead a lap before handing the lead to both Casey Mears and Dale Earnhardt Jr.

The race restarted on lap 111.

Trevor Bayne used a push from the top line to pull alongside Earnhardt Jr. before taking the lead on lap 113.

Dale Earnhardt Jr. eventually moved back to the head of the field on lap 119.

Despite being six laps down, Brad Keselowski pulled the middle line up to the front to help another driver challenge Dale for the lead. Unfortunately, coming through turn 4, Keselowski got loose and spun out in front of the field and collected eleven other cars, including points leader Jeff Gordon, defending race winner David Ragan and pole sitter Brian Scott, in the Big One on lap 137. “I was trying to get to the front and trying to stay up there and trying to get my lap back,’’ Keselowski said. “For some reason, the car took off on me and spun out. I feel bad that we tore up a bunch of cars. Certainly I wanted to get my laps back and have a shot to win at the end. The only way I was going to do that was by being really aggressive at the front of the field.’’ “He was driving really, really, really aggressively to get back up there,’’ Kenseth said of Keselowski. “I didn’t realize he was that many laps down. I don’t know what his strategy was but just lost control of his car in front of the field and when that happens it always collects a bunch of them." Asked if he was bitter with the way Keselowski was racing, Kenseth said, “If it was the other way around and it was anybody else except for him, we’d all be getting lectured.’’ “I don’t know what he was doing,’’ Gordon said. “Obviously thinking that was going to be the way to get his lap back. All that it did was get a bunch of other cars wrecked.’’ Marcos Ambrose took over the lead by beating Dale off pit road.

The race restarted with 45 laps to go. Greg Biffle got a good push on the outside line and dropped down in front of Ambrose to take back the lead.

Dale Earnhardt Jr. dropped to the bottom line to take back the lead with 43 laps to go.

The fifth caution of the race flew with 38 laps to go after David Gilliland's engine blew up going down the backstretch (recently named Alabama Gang Superstretch). Greg Biffle opted not to pit to assume the lead.

The race restarted with 32 laps to go.

Brian Vickers jumped from the middle to the inside line to take the lead with 30 laps to go.

Denny Hamlin, leading the middle line, took the lead with 27 laps to go.

Vickers and Hamlin swapped the lead back and forth for the next five laps until Kevin Harvick jumped to the head of the table with 21 laps to go.

Jimmie Johnson got loose in turn 3, overcorrected, hit Joey Logano and started an eight car crash. David Ragan, who made it through the first big wreck with no damage, was boxed in by Logano and Kurt Busch. This brought out the sixth caution of the race.

The race restarted with eight laps to go.

Denny Hamlin took back the lead on the restart. Hamlin and Harvick swapped the lead back and forth until Hamlin took the lead with six laps to go and the seventh caution of the race flew on the same lap. Carl Edwards was riding the third line from the bottom when he got loose and spun in turn 1. He was signaling the drivers behind him he might have had a left-rear tire going flat. He was hit driver side by Ryan Newman who, despite hitting him at high speed, suffered virtually no damage from the collision.

The race restarted with two laps to go.

As the field was coming to the white flag, Alex Bowman got hit from behind by Ryan Newman and turned down into Jimmie Johnson. He then turned head on into the wall just in front of the start/finish line. Also, Justin Allgaier got turned by Cole Whitt and slid through a small section of the infield grass that destroyed the nose of his car. A big piece of it detached from the car and landed in the middle of the track just a few feet from the start/finish line. With the field halfway down the backstretch, the caution was thrown and Denny Hamlin scored the victory. “We really just want to win races regardless of the implications this means for the Chase,” Hamlin said. “It feels like food to be back in Victory Lane. I’m just proud of our day today. We’ve come a long way. We couldn’t finish 22nd at the superspeedway races for a long time. It feels good to come to this type of racetrack and know you can win.” "It's frustrating because the simple fact is that we both felt we had the opportunity to pounce," Clint Bowyer said of the finish he’d hoped for teaming up with Biffle to catch the leader. "But NASCAR did the right thing. You can't put people in danger."

=== Race results ===
Pos	No.	Driver	Team	Manufacturer	Laps	Points
1	11	Denny Hamlin	Joe Gibbs Racing	Toyota	188	47
2	16	Greg Biffle	Roush Fenway Racing	Ford	188	44
3	15	Clint Bowyer	Michael Waltrip Racing	Toyota	188	41
4	55	Brian Vickers	Michael Waltrip Racing	Toyota	188	41
5	47	A. J. Allmendinger	JTG Daugherty Racing	Chevrolet	188	39
6	27	Paul Menard	Richard Childress Racing	Chevrolet	188	39
7	4	Kevin Harvick	Stewart–Haas Racing	Chevrolet	188	38
8	5	Kasey Kahne	Hendrick Motorsports	Chevrolet	188	36
9	42	Kyle Larson (R)	Chip Ganassi Racing	Chevrolet	188	35
10	17	Ricky Stenhouse Jr.	Roush Fenway Racing	Ford	188	34
11	40	Landon Cassill	Circle Sport	Chevrolet	188	0
12	18	Kyle Busch	Joe Gibbs Racing	Toyota	188	33
13	43	Aric Almirola	Richard Petty Motorsports	Ford	188	31
14	13	Casey Mears	Germain Racing	Chevrolet	188	31
15	3	Austin Dillon (R)	Richard Childress Racing	Chevrolet	188	29
16	7	Michael Annett (R)	Tommy Baldwin Racing	Chevrolet	188	28
17	78	Martin Truex Jr.	Furniture Row Racing	Chevrolet	188	27
18	31	Ryan Newman	Richard Childress Racing	Chevrolet	188	27
19	9	Marcos Ambrose	Richard Petty Motorsports	Ford	188	26
20	98	Josh Wise	Phil Parsons Racing	Ford	188	24
21	26	Cole Whitt (R)	BK Racing	Toyota	188	23
22	10	Danica Patrick	Stewart–Haas Racing	Chevrolet	188	23
23	48	Jimmie Johnson	Hendrick Motorsports	Chevrolet	188	22
24	32	Terry Labonte	Go FAS Racing	Ford	188	20
25	66	Michael Waltrip	Identity Ventures Racing	Toyota	188	19
26	88	Dale Earnhardt Jr.	Hendrick Motorsports	Chevrolet	188	19
27	51	Justin Allgaier (R)	HScott Motorsports	Chevrolet	188	17
28	23	Alex Bowman (R)	BK Racing	Toyota	187	16
29	1	Jamie McMurray	Chip Ganassi Racing	Chevrolet	187	15
30	99	Carl Edwards	Roush Fenway Racing	Ford	182	15
31	83	Ryan Truex (R)	BK Racing	Toyota	182	13
32	22	Joey Logano	Team Penske	Ford	174	13
33	41	Kurt Busch	Stewart–Haas Racing	Chevrolet	174	11
34	36	Reed Sorenson	Tommy Baldwin Racing	Chevrolet	174	11
35	34	David Ragan	Front Row Motorsports	Ford	174	10
36	95	Michael McDowell	Leavine Family Racing	Ford	174	9
37	20	Matt Kenseth	Joe Gibbs Racing	Toyota	171	8
38	2	Brad Keselowski	Team Penske	Ford	160	7
39	24	Jeff Gordon	Hendrick Motorsports	Chevrolet	156	6
40	38	David Gilliland	Front Row Motorsports	Ford	150	5
41	21	Trevor Bayne	Wood Brothers Racing	Ford	136	0
42	33	Brian Scott	Richard Childress Racing	Chevrolet	136	0
43	14	Tony Stewart	Stewart–Haas Racing	Chevrolet	136	1
Race Results

=== Race statistics ===
- Lead changes: 48 among different drivers
- Cautions/Laps: 8 for 31
- Red flags: 0
- Time of race: 3 hours, 17 minutes and 16 seconds
- Average speed: 152.103 miles per hour (244.786 km/h)

== Media ==
=== Television ===
Fox Sports
Booth announcers	Pit reporters
Lap-by-lap: Mike Joy; Color-commentator: Larry McReynolds; Color commentator: Darrell Waltrip	Matt Yocum; Steve Byrnes; Krista Voda; Jeff Hammond

=== Radio ===
MRN Radio
Booth announcers	Turn announcers	Pit reporters
Lead announcer: Joe Moore; Announcer: Barney Hall	Turns 1 & 2: Dave Moody; Backstretch: Mike Bagley; Turns 3 & 4: Kyle Rickey	Winston Kelly; Steve Post; Alex Hayden; Woody Cain

== Standings after the race ==
Drivers' Championship standings

	Pos	Driver	Points
	1	Jeff Gordon	347
	2	Matt Kenseth	344 (−3)
1	3	Kyle Busch	343 (−4)
1	4	Dale Earnhardt Jr.	328 (−19)
2	5	Carl Edwards	328 (−19)
	6	Joey Logano	305 (−42)
1	7	Jimmie Johnson	304 (−43)
3	8	Greg Biffle	300 (−47)
	9	Ryan Newman	299 (−48)
	10	Brian Vickers	297 (−50)
4	11	Brad Keselowski	294 (−53)
2	12	Denny Hamlin	292 (−55)
	13	Kyle Larson (R)	286 (−61)
2	14	Austin Dillon (R)	281 (−66)
2	15	A. J. Allmendinger	279 (−68)
	16	Marcos Ambrose	268 (−79)

Manufacturers' Championship standings

Pos	Manufacturer	Points
1	Chevrolet	442
2	Ford	433 (−9)
3	Toyota	409 (−33)

- Note: Only the first sixteen positions are included for the driver standings.

== Notes ==
Previous race: 2014 Toyota Owners 400	Sprint Cup Series; 2014 season	Next race: 2014 5-hour Energy 400
