= 2013 Quaker State 400 =

Race details
- Race 17 of 36 in the 2013 NASCAR Sprint Cup Series
- The 2013 Quaker State 400 program cover, with artwork by Sam Bass. The painting is called "Kentucky Moonlight".
- Date: June 29, 2013; June 30, 2013 (Postponed)
- Location: Kentucky Speedway, Sparta, Kentucky, United States
- Course: Permanent racing facility
- Course length: 1.5 miles (2.4 km)
- Distance: 267 laps, 400.5 mi (644.542 km)
- Weather: Temperatures reaching up to 69.1 °F (20.6 °C); wind speeds approaching 6 miles per hour (9.7 km/h)
- Average speed: 131.948 mph (212.350 km/h)

Pole position
Driver	Dale Earnhardt Jr.	Hendrick Motorsports
- Time: 29.406 seconds

Most laps led
Driver	Jimmie Johnson	Hendrick Motorsports
- Laps: 182

Winner
No. 20	Matt Kenseth	Joe Gibbs Racing

Television in the United States
- Network: TNT
- Announcers: Adam Alexander, Wally Dallenbach Jr. and Kyle Petty
- Nielsen ratings: 2.6 (3.984 million viewers)

The race logo for the 2013 Quaker State 400.

The 2013 Quaker State 400 presented by Advance Auto Parts was a NASCAR Sprint Cup Series stock car race scheduled to be held on June 29, 2013, at Kentucky Speedway in Sparta, Kentucky, United States, but was postponed to June 30 due to persistent rain. Contested over 267 laps on the 1.5-mile (2.4 km) tri-oval, it was the seventeenth race of the 2013 Sprint Cup Series championship. Matt Kenseth of Joe Gibbs Racing won the race, his fourth win of the 2013 season, while Jamie McMurray finished second. Clint Bowyer, Joey Logano, and Kyle Busch rounded out the top five.

== Report ==
=== Entry list ===
(R) - Denotes rookie driver.

(i) - Denotes driver who is ineligible for series driver points.

No.	Driver	Team	Manufacturer
1	Jamie McMurray	Earnhardt Ganassi Racing	Chevrolet
2	Brad Keselowski	Penske Racing	Ford
5	Kasey Kahne	Hendrick Motorsports	Chevrolet
7	Dave Blaney	Tommy Baldwin Racing	Chevrolet
9	Marcos Ambrose	Richard Petty Motorsports	Ford
10	Danica Patrick (R)	Stewart–Haas Racing	Chevrolet
11	Denny Hamlin	Joe Gibbs Racing	Toyota
13	Casey Mears	Germain Racing	Ford
14	Tony Stewart	Stewart–Haas Racing	Chevrolet
15	Clint Bowyer	Michael Waltrip Racing	Toyota
16	Greg Biffle	Roush Fenway Racing	Ford
17	Ricky Stenhouse Jr. (R)	Roush Fenway Racing	Ford
18	Kyle Busch	Joe Gibbs Racing	Toyota
19	Mike Bliss (i)	Humphrey Smith Racing	Toyota
20	Matt Kenseth	Joe Gibbs Racing	Toyota
22	Joey Logano	Penske Racing	Ford
24	Jeff Gordon	Hendrick Motorsports	Chevrolet
27	Paul Menard	Richard Childress Racing	Chevrolet
29	Kevin Harvick	Richard Childress Racing	Chevrolet
30	David Stremme	Swan Racing	Toyota
31	Jeff Burton	Richard Childress Racing	Chevrolet
32	Ken Schrader	FAS Lane Racing	Ford
33	Landon Cassill (i)	Circle Sport	Chevrolet
34	David Ragan	Front Row Motorsports	Ford
35	Josh Wise (i)	Front Row Motorsports	Ford
36	J. J. Yeley	Tommy Baldwin Racing	Chevrolet
38	David Gilliland	Front Row Motorsports	Ford
39	Ryan Newman	Stewart–Haas Racing	Chevrolet
42	Juan Pablo Montoya	Earnhardt Ganassi Racing	Chevrolet
43	Aric Almirola	Richard Petty Motorsports	Ford
44	Scott Riggs	Xxxtreme Motorsports	Ford
47	A. J. Allmendinger	JTG Daugherty Racing	Toyota
48	Jimmie Johnson	Hendrick Motorsports	Chevrolet
51	Austin Dillon (i)	Phoenix Racing	Chevrolet
55	Brian Vickers (i)	Michael Waltrip Racing	Toyota
56	Martin Truex Jr.	Michael Waltrip Racing	Toyota
78	Kurt Busch	Furniture Row Racing	Chevrolet
83	David Reutimann	BK Racing	Toyota
87	Joe Nemechek (i)	NEMCO-Jay Robinson Racing	Toyota
88	Dale Earnhardt Jr.	Hendrick Motorsports	Chevrolet
93	Travis Kvapil	BK Racing	Toyota
98	Michael McDowell	Phil Parsons Racing	Ford
99	Carl Edwards	Roush Fenway Racing	Ford
Official entry list

=== Practice and qualifying ===
Two practice sessions were held on June 28 in preparation for the race. The first session was 60 minutes in duration, while the second session was 90 minutes long.

During the first practice session, Kevin Harvick, for the Richard Childress Racing team, was quickest ahead of Jimmie Johnson in second and Brad Keselowski in third. Kurt Busch scored fourth and Jeff Gordon managed fifth. Kyle Busch, Brian Vickers, Juan Pablo Montoya, Paul Menard, and Ricky Stenhouse Jr. rounded out the top ten quickest drivers in the session. In the final practice session for the race, Johnson was quickest with a time of 29.819 seconds. Carl Edwards followed in second ahead of Kyle Busch and Jeff Gordon in third and fourth. Jeff Burton, who was twelfth quickest in second practice, managed fifth.

During qualifying, Dale Earnhardt Jr. clinched his twelfth career pole position, with a record lap time of 29.406 seconds and a speed of 183.636 miles per hour (295.533 km/h). After his qualifying run, Earnhardt Jr. said, "We thought we had a top-five car in practice, and we got some good cloud cover about six or seven cars in front of us before we went to qualify, and that brought the track temp down to give us a good advantage," Earnhardt said. "It gave us a good opportunity to run a bit quicker lap than maybe what the car had in it." He was joined on the front row of the grid by Edwards. Johnson qualified third, Kyle Busch took fourth, and Marcos Ambrose started fifth. Denny Hamlin, Ryan Newman, Brad Keselowski, Brian Vickers, and Juan Pablo Montoya completed the first ten positions on the grid.

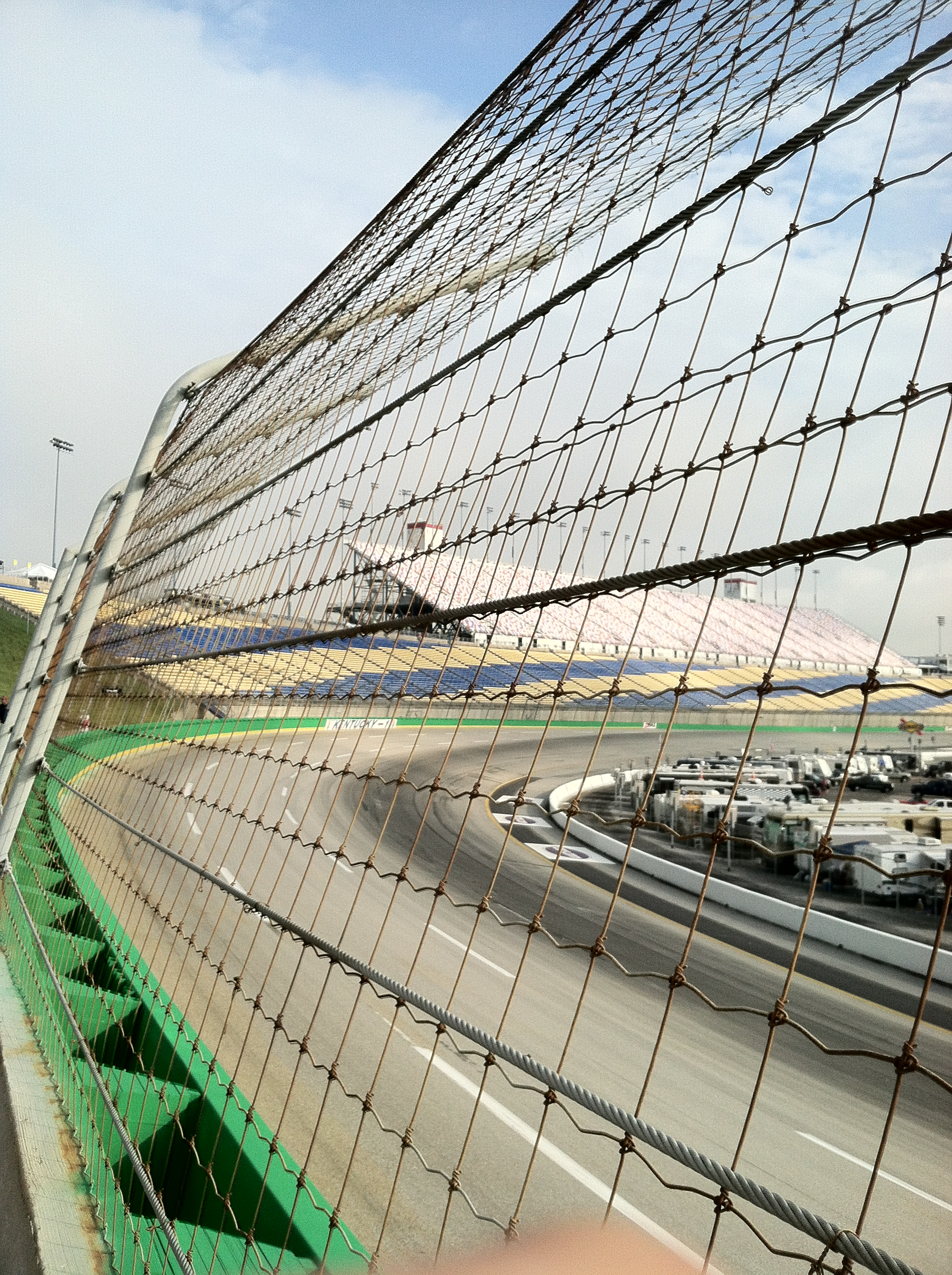
The early morning hours of race day.

=== Race ===
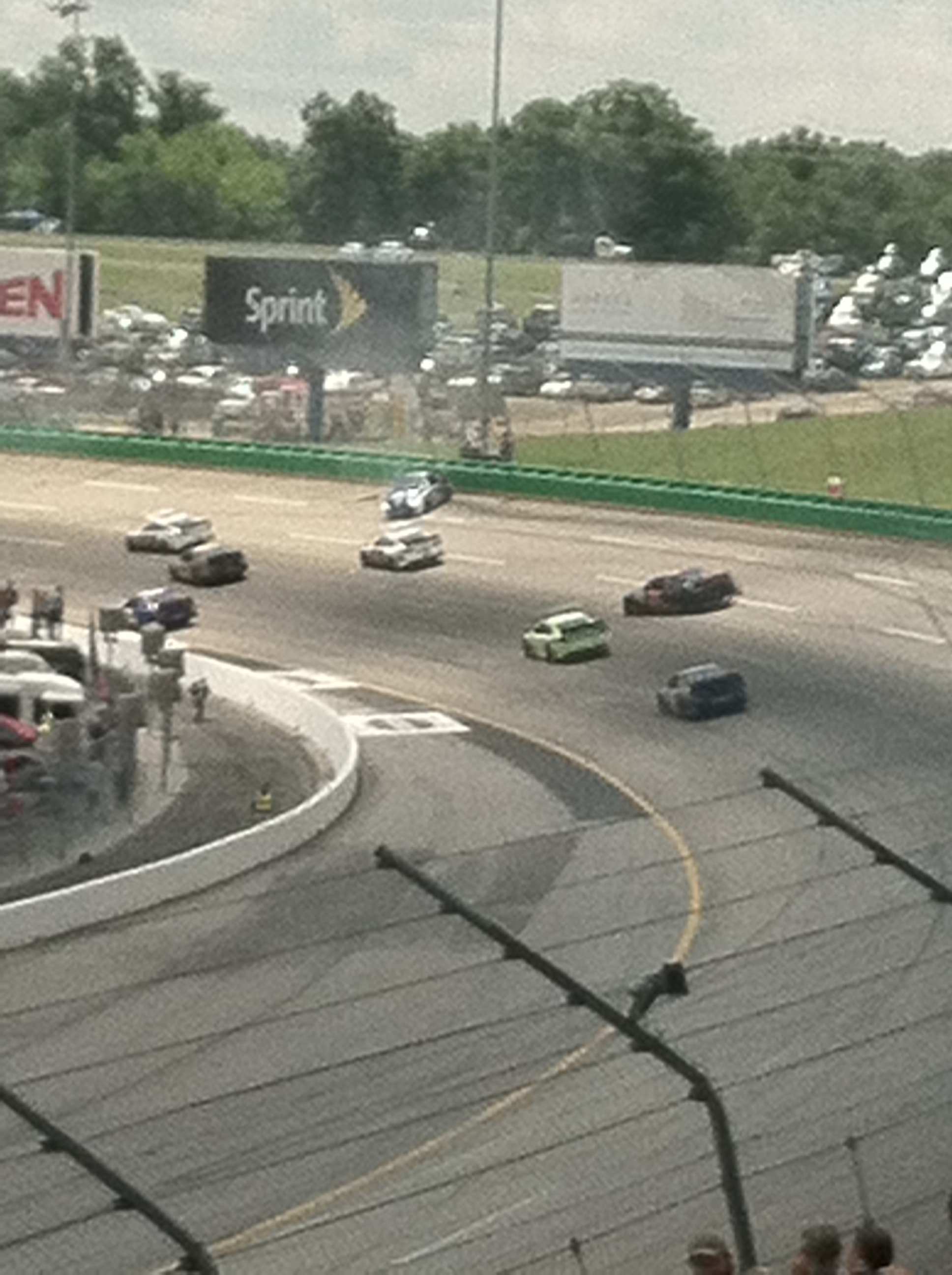
Defending race winner Brad Keselowski goes for a spin in the grass and then comes back up onto the track, into the wall and takes out multiple cars.

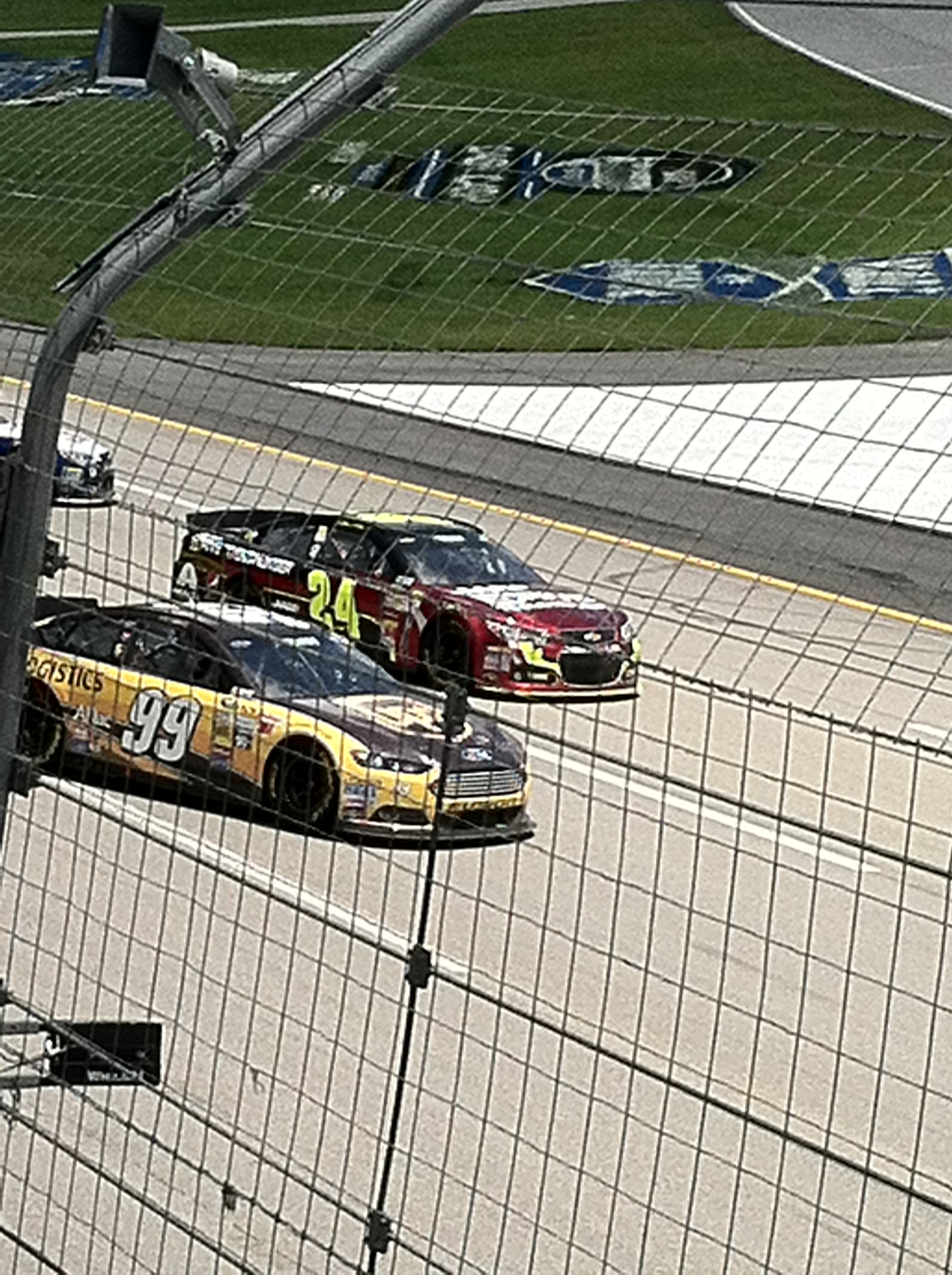
Jeff Gordon, Carl Edwards, and the field are stopped on the front stretch because of a crash in turn 1.

=== Start ===
==== First half ====
The race was scheduled to start on the Saturday at 8:00 p.m., but was delayed until the following afternoon due to rain, with the new start time set at 12:00 p.m. E.T. This change in schedule prompted NASCAR to impose a competition caution on lap 30 ahead of the race to allow teams to check their tire wear and make adjustments.

Carl Edwards led lap 1. The race ran without incident until the scheduled competition caution was brought out on lap 29, and ended on lap 36. The second caution of the race was issued for a tire blowout on lap 39 and lasted until lap 48. The third caution occurred on lap 49 for a multi-car wreck including Brad Keselowski, Greg Biffle, Kurt Busch, and others. It started with Brad Keselowski spinning in the grass, taking out multiple cars in the process. The wreck caused the red flag to be displayed with Jimmie Johnson as the race leader. The fourth caution came out on lap 89 for debris on the track.

===== Second half =====
David Gilliland blew a tire Kasey Kahne won the free pass, and the race restarted on lap 94. The fifth caution of the race came out on lap 149; Jeff Gordon won the free pass under caution, and the race restarted on lap 154. Jimmie Johnson took the lead, and then the next caution was on lap 241 for a tire blowout.

==== Final wreck and finish ====
The race restarted on lap 243, and on 246, the sixth caution came out. The race restarted on lap 250, and Matt Kenseth won his first race at Kentucky.

== Results ==
=== Qualifying ===
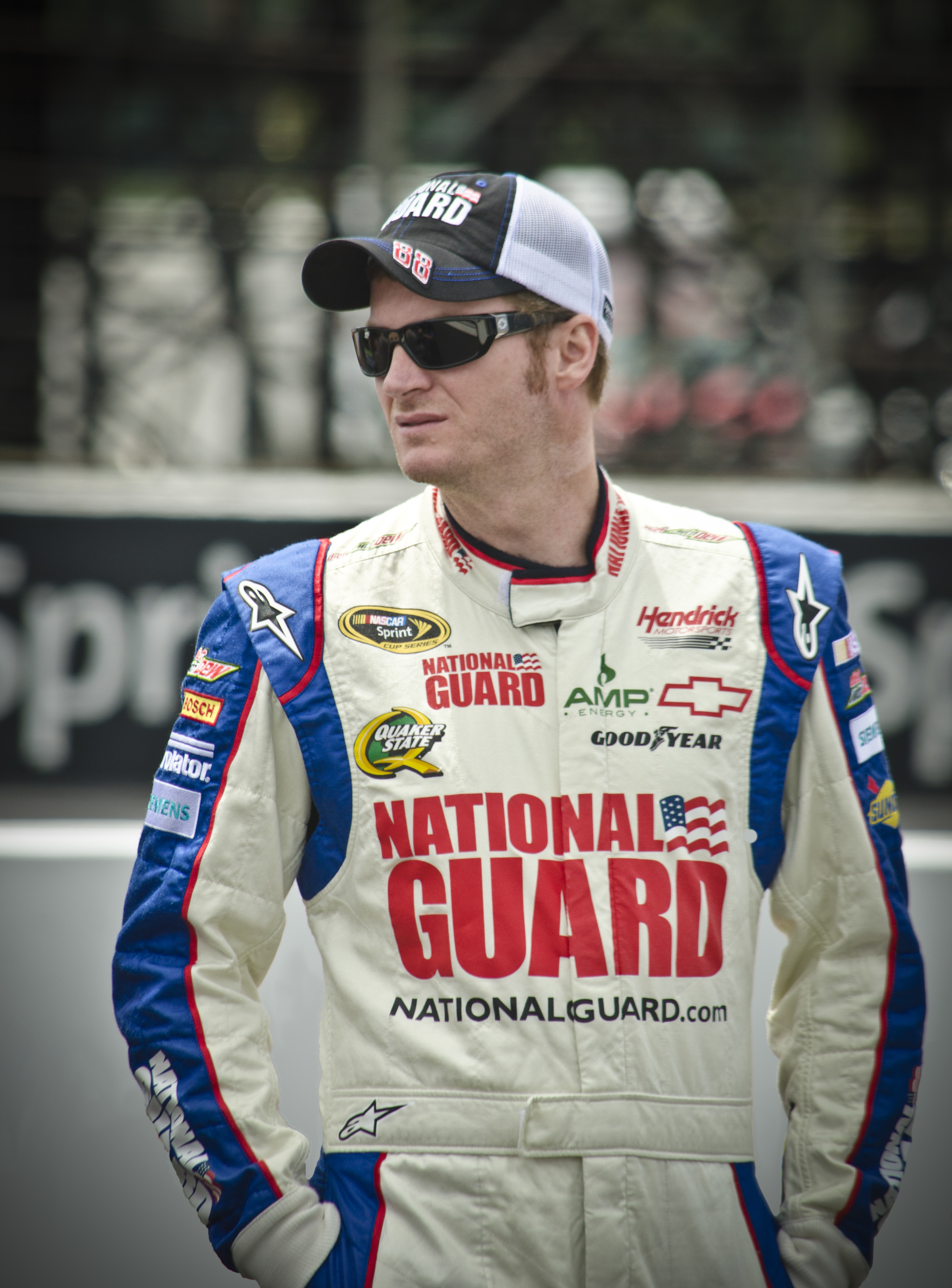
Dale Earnhardt Jr. won his first pole position of the year, setting a new qualifying speed record of 183.636 mph.

Grid	No.	Driver	Team	Manufacturer	Time	Speed
1	88	Dale Earnhardt Jr.	Hendrick Motorsports	Chevrolet	29.406	183.636
2	99	Carl Edwards	Roush Fenway Racing	Ford	29.459	183.306
3	48	Jimmie Johnson	Hendrick Motorsports	Chevrolet	29.485	183.144
4	18	Kyle Busch	Joe Gibbs Racing	Toyota	29.574	182.593
5	9	Marcos Ambrose	Richard Petty Motorsports	Ford	29.575	182.587
6	11	Denny Hamlin	Joe Gibbs Racing	Toyota	29.615	182.340
7	39	Ryan Newman	Stewart–Haas Racing	Chevrolet	29.629	182.254
8	2	Brad Keselowski	Penske Racing	Ford	29.639	182.192
9	55	Brian Vickers	Michael Waltrip Racing	Toyota	29.683	181.922
10	42	Juan Pablo Montoya	Earnhardt Ganassi Racing	Chevrolet	29.716	181.720
11	22	Joey Logano	Penske Racing	Ford	29.718	181.708
12	24	Jeff Gordon	Hendrick Motorsports	Chevrolet	29.727	181.653
13	17	Ricky Stenhouse Jr.	Roush Fenway Racing	Ford	29.770	181.391
14	31	Jeff Burton	Richard Childress Racing	Ford	29.775	181.360
15	15	Clint Bowyer	Michael Waltrip Racing	Toyota	29.808	181.159
16	20	Matt Kenseth	Joe Gibbs Racing	Toyota	29.816	181.111
17	47	A. J. Allmendinger	JTG Daugherty Racing	Toyota	29.852	180.892
18	43	Aric Almirola	Richard Petty Motorsports	Ford	29.856	180.868
19	56	Martin Truex Jr.	Michael Waltrip Racing	Toyota	29.862	180.832
20	16	Greg Biffle	Roush Fenway Racing	Ford	29.873	180.765
21	5	Kasey Kahne	Hendrick Motorsports	Chevrolet	29.894	180.638
22	29	Kevin Harvick	Richard Childress Racing	Chevrolet	29.904	180.578
23	1	Jamie McMurray	Earnhardt Ganassi Racing	Chevrolet	29.926	180.445
24	27	Paul Menard	Richard Childress Racing	Chevrolet	30.005	179.970
25	14	Tony Stewart	Stewart–Haas Racing	Chevrolet	30.006	179.964
26	51	Austin Dillon	Phoenix Racing	Chevrolet	30.033	179.802
27	78	Kurt Busch	Furniture Row Racing	Chevrolet	30.102	179.390
28	30	David Stremme	Swan Racing	Toyota	30.155	179.075
29	10	Danica Patrick	Stewart–Haas Racing	Chevrolet	30.177	178.944
30	33	Landon Cassill	Circle Sport	Chevrolet	30.292	178.265
31	13	Casey Mears	Germain Racing	Ford	30.297	178.235
32	7	Dave Blaney	Tommy Baldwin Racing	Chevrolet	30.340	177.983
33	98	Michael McDowell	Phil Parsons Racing	Ford	30.386	177.713
34	38	David Gilliland	Front Row Motorsports	Ford	30.425	177.486
35	36	J. J. Yeley	Tommy Baldwin Racing	Chevrolet	30.571	176.638
36	83	David Reutimann	BK Racing	Toyota	30.597	176.488
37	35	Josh Wise	Front Row Motorsports	Ford	30.615	176.384
38	34	David Ragan	Front Row Motorsports	Ford	30.622	176.344
39	19	Mike Bliss	Humphrey Smith Racing	Toyota	30.714	175.816
40	93	Travis Kvapil	BK Racing	Toyota	30.733	175.707
41	87	Joe Nemechek	NEMCO-Jay Robinson Racing	Toyota	30.816	175.234
42	44	Scott Riggs	Xxxtreme Motorsports	Ford	30.832	175.143
43	32	Ken Schrader	FAS Lane Racing	Ford	31.216	172.988

=== Race results ===
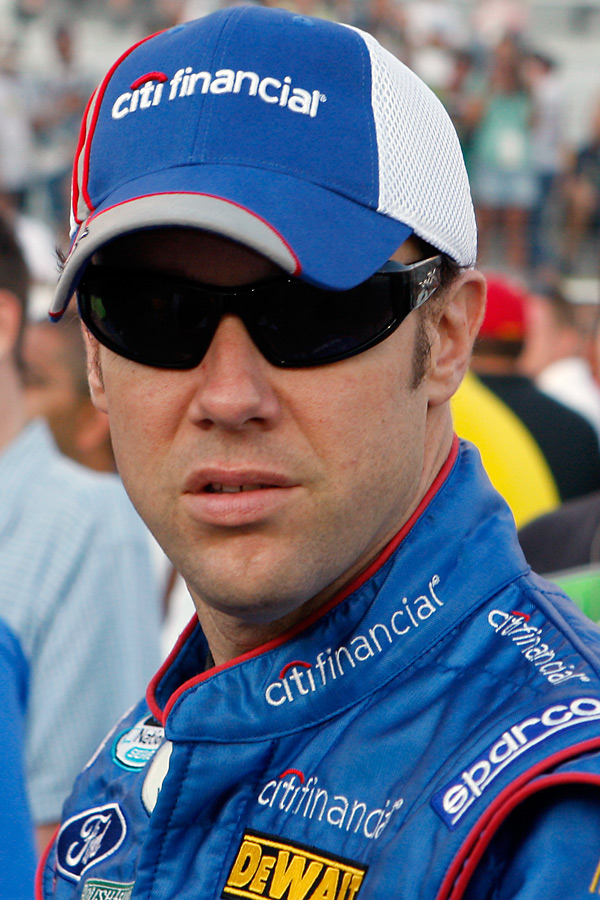
Matt Kenseth took his fourth race victory of the 2013 season.

Pos	No.	Driver	Team	Manufacturer	Laps	Led	Points^{1}
1	20	Matt Kenseth	Joe Gibbs Racing	Toyota	267	38	47
2	1	Jamie McMurray	Earnhardt Ganassi Racing	Chevrolet	267	0	42
3	15	Clint Bowyer	Michael Waltrip Racing	Toyota	267	0	41
4	22	Joey Logano	Penske Racing	Ford	267	0	40
5	18	Kyle Busch	Joe Gibbs Racing	Toyota	267	0	39
6	78	Kurt Busch	Furniture Row Racing	Chevrolet	267	0	38
7	56	Martin Truex Jr.	Michael Waltrip Racing	Toyota	267	0	37
8	24	Jeff Gordon	Hendrick Motorsports	Chevrolet	267	0	36
9	48	Jimmie Johnson	Hendrick Motorsports	Chevrolet	267	182	37
10	29	Kevin Harvick	Richard Childress Racing	Chevrolet	267	0	34
11	5	Kasey Kahne	Hendrick Motorsports	Chevrolet	267	0	33
12	88	Dale Earnhardt Jr.	Hendrick Motorsports	Chevrolet	267	10	33
13	9	Marcos Ambrose	Richard Petty Motorsports	Ford	267	0	31
14	39	Ryan Newman	Stewart–Haas Racing	Chevrolet	267	0	30
15	43	Aric Almirola	Richard Petty Motorsports	Ford	267	0	29
16	42	Juan Pablo Montoya	Earnhardt Ganassi Racing	Chevrolet	267	0	28
17	17	Ricky Stenhouse Jr.	Roush Fenway Racing	Ford	267	0	27
18	13	Casey Mears	Germain Racing	Ford	267	1	27
19	31	Jeff Burton	Richard Childress Racing	Chevrolet	267	0	25
20	14	Tony Stewart	Stewart–Haas Racing	Chevrolet	267	0	24
21	99	Carl Edwards	Roush Fenway Racing	Ford	267	35	24
22	47	A. J. Allmendinger	JTG Daugherty Racing	Toyota	267	0	22
23	10	Danica Patrick	Stewart–Haas Racing	Chevrolet	267	0	21
24	51	Austin Dillon	Phoenix Racing	Chevrolet	267	0	0^{[2]}
25	30	David Stremme	Swan Racing	Toyota	267	0	19
26	34	David Ragan	Front Row Motorsports	Ford	265	0	18
27	83	David Reutimann	BK Racing	Toyota	263	0	17
28	38	David Gilliland	Front Row Motorsports	Ford	262	1	17
29	32	Ken Schrader	FAS Lane Racing	Ford	262	0	15
30	27	Paul Menard	Richard Childress Racing	Chevrolet	259	0	14
31	55	Brian Vickers	Michael Waltrip Racing	Toyota	240	0	0^{[2]}
32	36	J. J. Yeley	Tommy Baldwin Racing	Chevrolet	165	0	12
33	2	Brad Keselowski	Penske Racing	Ford	153	0	11
34	16	Greg Biffle	Roush Fenway Racing	Ford	151	0	10
35	11	Denny Hamlin	Joe Gibbs Racing	Toyota	147	0	9
36	33	Landon Cassill	Circle Sport	Chevrolet	104	0	0^{[2]}
37	87	Joe Nemechek	NEMCO-Jay Robinson Racing	Toyota	95	0	0^{[2]}
38	98	Michael McDowell	Phil Parsons Racing	Ford	84	0	6
39	35	Josh Wise	Front Row Motorsports	Ford	77	0	0^{[2]}
40	7	Dave Blaney	Tommy Baldwin Racing	Chevrolet	62	0	4
41	19	Mike Bliss	Humphrey Smith Racing	Toyota	57	0	0^{[2]}
42	93	Travis Kvapil	BK Racing	Toyota	47	0	2
43	44	Scott Riggs	Xxxtreme Motorsports	Ford	6	0	0^{3}

Notes
1. Points include 3 Chase for the Sprint Cup points for winning, 1 point for leading a lap, and 1 point for most laps led.
2. ^{a} ^{b} ^{c} ^{d} ^{e} ^{f} Ineligible for driver's championship points.
3. Post entry, driver and owner did not score points.

== Standings after the race ==
Drivers' Championship standings

Pos	Driver	Points
1	Jimmie Johnson	610
2	Carl Edwards	572 (–38)
3	Clint Bowyer	569 (–41)
4	Kevin Harvick	544 (–66)
5	Matt Kenseth	528 (–82)

Manufacturers' Championship standings

Pos	Manufacturer	Points
1	Chevrolet	119
2	Toyota	110 (–9)
3	Ford	87 (–32)

- Note: Only the first ten positions are included for the driver standings.

Previous race: 2013 Toyota/Save Mart 350	Sprint Cup Series; 2013 season	Next race: 2013 Coke Zero 400
