= HScott Motorsports =

American stock car racing team

- Owner: Harry Scott Jr.
- Base: Mooresville, North Carolina
- Series: Sprint Cup Series; Xfinity Series; K&N Pro Series East; ARCA Racing Series
- Race drivers: Sprint Cup Series: Clint Bowyer, Michael Annett, Bobby Labonte, Justin Allgaier, Kyle Larson, Brennan Poole, Justin Marks, Dylan Kwasniewski, Justin Haley, Harrison Burton, Hunter Baize, Tyler Dippel, William Byron, Ben Rhodes
- Manufacturer: Chevrolet
- Opened: 2013
- Closed: 2016

Career
- Debut: Sprint Cup Series: 2013 Federated Auto Parts 400 (Richmond); Xfinity Series: 2015 Alert Today Florida 300 (Daytona)
- Latest race: Sprint Cup Series: 2016 Ford EcoBoost 400 (Homestead); Xfinity Series: 2015 Ford EcoBoost 300 (Homestead)
- Races competed: Total: 351; Sprint Cup Series: 189; Xfinity Series: 33; K&N Pro Series East: 126; ARCA Racing Series: 3
- Drivers' Championships: Total: 2 Sprint Cup Series: 0 Xfinity Series: 0 K&N Pro Series East: 2
- Race victories: Total: 11; Sprint Cup Series: 0 Xfinity Series: 1 K&N Pro Series East: 10
- Pole positions: Total: 11; Sprint Cup Series: 0 Xfinity Series: 0 K&N Pro Series East: 11

HScott Motorsports was an American professional stock car racing team that last competed in the NASCAR Sprint Cup Series, the Xfinity Series, the K&N Pro Series East and the ARCA Racing Series. The organization was owned by North Carolina businessman Harry Scott Jr., a former owner of the defunct Nationwide and Camping World Truck Series team Turner Scott Motorsports (TSM). Scott was the owner of team sponsor AccuDoc Solutions.

The Sprint Cup Series team was founded in 1990 as Phoenix Racing by Florida businessman James Finch, and named for his business Phoenix Construction. The organization as currently constituted was formed when Harry Scott purchased Finch's Cup Series team in late 2013, and then took over the Xfinity and K&N Pro Series operations of TSM following the 2014 season. In the Sprint Cup Series, the team last fielded the No. 15 5-Hour Energy/Aaron's/Visine/PEAK Chevrolet SS full-time for Clint Bowyer and the No. 46 Pilot Flying J SS full-time for Michael Annett. Scott also fielded several teams in the K&N Pro Series East in a partnership with driver Justin Marks, winning the 2015 and 2016 Championships. The Xfinity Series program has since been moved to Chip Ganassi Racing.

The team sold their charter in December 2016 and eventually shut down the Cup and K&N teams for 2017. Months later, on August 2 of 2017, Harry Scott Jr. died.

== Sprint Cup Series ==
=== Car No. 15 history ===
Following sponsorship struggles, longtime Phoenix Racing owner James Finch sold his Spartanburg, South Carolina-based operation to Harry Scott Jr. in mid-2013, with Finch's last race as an owner at the Atlanta Labor Day Event in September. Scott continued to use the No. 51, Finch's longtime car number.

Ryan Truex, who had driven for Phoenix at Bristol earlier in the year, drove Scott's first race as owner at Richmond, finishing 35th (With sponsor SeaWatch Intl.). Although the team used the old Phoenix Racing number font for the first race, for his second race Scott's ownership was displayed by changing the paint scheme and number style of the car to match those used by Turner Scott Motorsports (Scott's Xfinity series team at the time). In addition, on February 5, 2014, Scott announced that Phoenix Racing would be renamed HScott Motorsports.

Scott's Nationwide Series driver Justin Allgaier drove the car with Brandt Agricultural sponsorship at Chicagoland, Kansas, Talladega and Phoenix.

Kyle Larson, Allgaier's teammate at Turner Scott who was set to take over the No. 42 car the next year at Chip Ganassi Racing, drove the car at Charlotte, Martinsville and Homestead with an inverted white and red Target scheme. He also drove at Texas with Visitdallas.com on the car.

Larson started 21st at Charlotte, but a late engine failure relegated him to a 37th-place finish. Michael McDowell would run the car at New Hampshire (Finished 30th with sponsor SEM Products), and Truex made his third start for the team at his home track Dover (Finished 32nd with sponsor Shooters Sporting Center). Allgaier would have a best finish of 24th at Talladega, while Larson would have the team's best finish a 15th at Homestead, while also leading the team's first lap.

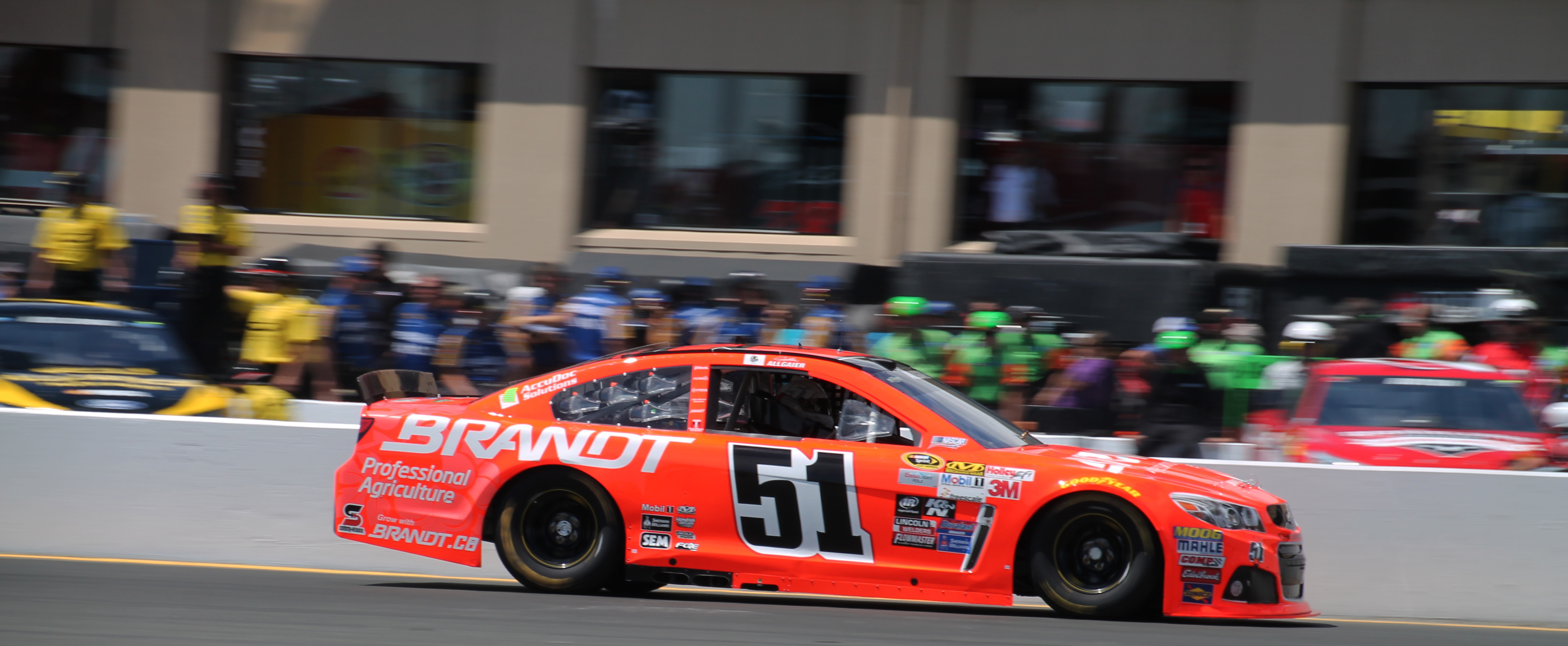
Justin Allgaier at Sonoma in 2015.

The team announced following the season that Allgaier would drive the No. 51 and compete for Rookie of the Year honors in 2014 with crew chief Steve Addington. Allgaier finished third in the ROTY standings behind Kyle Larson and Austin Dillon and 29th in the standings. His best finish was 15th at Charlotte and Homestead. The team failed to qualify for a single race, the GEICO 500 at Talladega in the fall, due to an unusual qualifying session that also saw another full-time driver also miss the race. The team had Brandt as the primary sponsor for 22 races with Scott's Accu-Doc Solutions being the sponsor for five races. The team had sponsors Auto-Owners Insurance, Sherwin-Williams, SEM Products, HendrickCars.com, Carcoon Airflow, Collision Cure Body Werks and Visitdallas.com filling in the rest of the schedule.

Allgaier returned to the team in 2015, with Brandt continuing to sponsor the team. He successfully qualified for the first two races of the season. Allgaier crashed during the 2015 Daytona 500 but rebounded a few weeks later at Phoenix. He was lapped on lap 56 during the 2015 Camping World.com 500 at Phoenix. Despite this, thanks to a strategy call by crew chief Addington, Allgaier got back onto the lead lap and raced his way into the top ten by the time there were 35 laps to go. After contact with Tony Stewart, Allgaier faded in the final five laps, finishing 18th. The next week at Fontana, he repeated his Phoenix performance, running as high as 8th and finishing 12th-his best finish at the time. A few weeks later, at Bristol, Allgaier ran well all race, even up in the top 5 at one point. Allgaier ended up finishing eighth, his first Cup top-ten, and the first for HScott Motorsports as well. The team's good performance started to fade during the summer and Allgaier finished 30th in points. Also sponsoring the 51 that season was Auto-Owners Insurance, FOE.com, Switch Hitch, Accu-Doc Solutions, SEM products, TradeMark Nitrogen, Flipping Ships, and Texas Lottery.

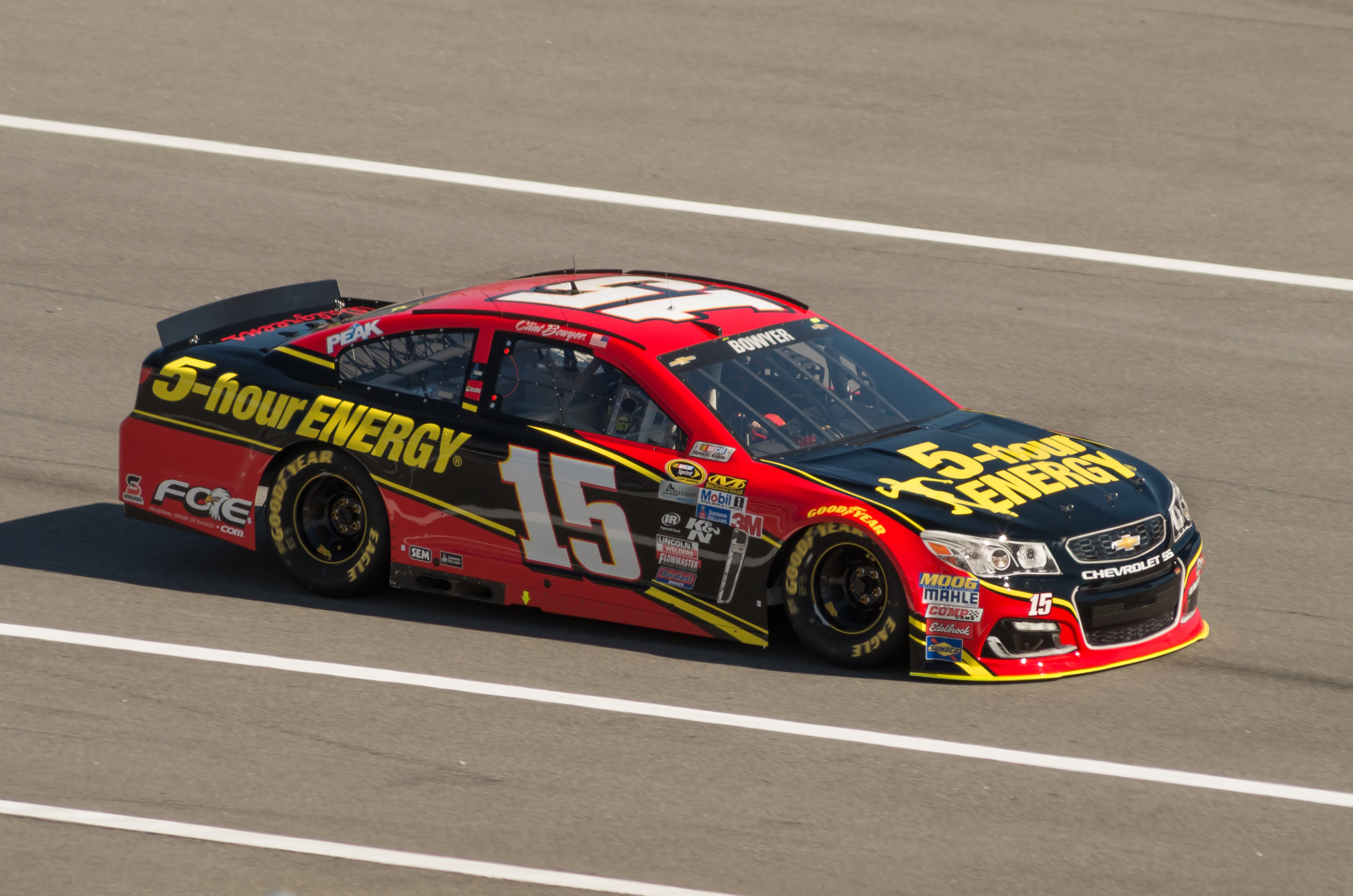
Clint Bowyer in the No. 15 at Daytona International Speedway in 2016.

Parting ways with HScott Motorsports after the 2015 season, Allgaier took Brandt and returned to the Xfinity Series for JR Motorsports in 2016. Clint Bowyer, who had lost his ride when Michael Waltrip Racing folded with a year remaining on his contract and was already signed to Stewart–Haas Racing for 2017, was signed to a one-year contract to replace him. Carrying over with him was his car number, 15, and his sponsorship deals from 5-Hour Energy, Visine, Aaron's and PEAK as per the terms of his original contract at MWR. Scott's own Accu-Doc Solutions was on the car for four races.

The team struggled early in the season when the expected help from SHR never materialized. Despite having a rough start to the season, Bowyer turned things around in April when he finished eighth at Bristol. He then finished seventh at Talladega, the best finish for HSM and later followed that with a ninth at Daytona. Even with the terrible start to the season, Bowyer would finish 27th in points (The 15 was 28th in Owner points).

After the season ended, Bowyer announced that he would be suing HScott Motorsports for $2.2 million in prize money and commission. Both parties would settle the dispute a week later. On December 5, with no viable sponsor/driver options for 2017, Harry Scott announced that he had sold the No. 15 charter to Premium Motorsports and closed his operation. One of HScott's cars from the No. 15 team was later purchased by MBM Motorsports in the off-season, in which MBM would use it to participate as a part-time team in the 2017 season.

=== Car No. 15 results ===
Year	Driver	No.	Make	1	2	3	4	5	6	7	8	9	10	11	12	13	14	15	16	17	18	19	20	21	22	23	24	25	26	27	28	29	30	31	32	33	34	35	36	Owners	Pts
2013*	Ryan Truex	51	Chevy	DAY	PHO	LVS	BRI	CAL	MAR	TEX	KAN	RCH	TAL	DAR	CLT	DOV	POC	MCH	SON	KEN	DAY	NHA	IND	POC	GLN	MCH	BRI	ATL	RCH; 35			DOV; 32								30th	633
2013*	Justin Allgaier	51	Chevy																											CHI; 27			KAN; 39		TAL; 24			PHO; 31		30th	633
2013*	Michael McDowell	51	Chevy																												NHA; 30									30th	633
2013*	Kyle Larson	51	Chevy																															CLT; 37		MAR; 42	TEX; 23		HOM; 15	30th	633
2014	Justin Allgaier	51	Chevy	DAY; 27	PHO; 30	LVS; 31	BRI; 17	CAL; 28	MAR; 23	TEX; 24	DAR; 23	RCH; 21	TAL; 27	KAN; 36	CLT; 37	DOV; 26	POC; 27	MCH; 16	SON; 33	KEN; 24	DAY; 25	NHA; 37	IND; 27	POC; 16	GLN; 17	MCH; 42	BRI; 19	ATL; 26	RCH; 28	CHI; 27	NHA; 20	DOV; 29	KAN; 41	CLT; 15	TAL; DNQ	MAR; 17	TEX; 20	PHO; 37	HOM; 15	29th	636
2015	Justin Allgaier	51	Chevy	DAY; 37	ATL; 20	LVS; 31	PHO; 18	CAL; 12	MAR; 42	TEX; 39	BRI; 8	RCH; 18	TAL; 23	KAN; 30	CLT; 43	DOV; 42	POC; 20	MCH; 27	SON; 35	DAY; 18	KEN; 24	NHA; 40	IND; 37	POC; 24	GLN; 19	MCH; 29	BRI; 12	DAR; 33	RCH; 25	CHI; 23	NHA; 39	DOV; 27	CLT; 40	KAN; 26	TAL; 42	MAR; 13	TEX; 28	PHO; 17	HOM; 36	30th	588
2016	Clint Bowyer	15	Chevy	DAY; 33	ATL; 35	LVS; 22	PHO; 31	CAL; 18	MAR; 25	TEX; 38	BRI; 8	RCH; 33	TAL; 7	KAN; 19	DOV; 12	CLT; 23	POC; 18	MCH; 23	SON; 40	DAY; 9	KEN; 23	NHA; 24	IND; 21	POC; 26	GLN; 18	BRI; 31	MCH; 40	DAR; 22	RCH; 22	CHI; 22	NHA; 22	DOV; 24	CLT; 17	KAN; 26	TAL; 18	MAR; 28	TEX; 25	PHO; 24	HOM; 23	28th	628

- 2013 stats started after Scott complete took the ownership of No. 51 from Phoenix Racing before Richmond (fall) race.

=== Car No. 46 history ===
It was announced prior to the 2014 season that former Phoenix Racing owner James Finch would return to field a part-time entry numbered 52 with HScott for Bobby Labonte, beginning with the Daytona 500. Labonte ran the second HScott car during preseason Daytona testing using Scott's TSM number style, then used Finch's traditional Phoenix Racing number style and paint scheme during the Daytona 500. The team picked up sponsorship from the Florida Lottery, and Labonte finished a solid 15th. The team did not run the rest of the season.

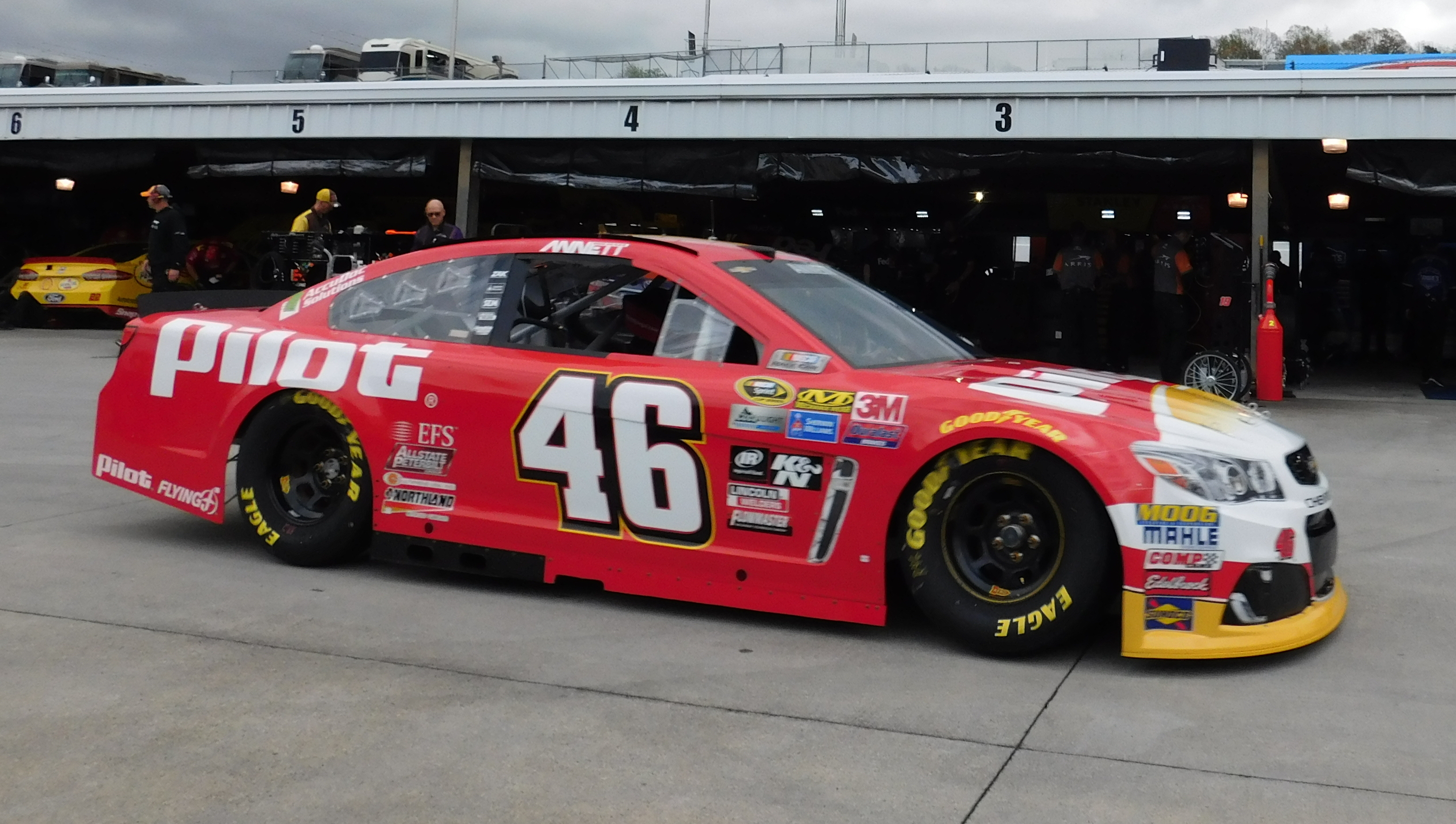
Michael Annett's No. 46 at Martinsville Speedway in 2016

In late January 2015, Michael Annett brought his longtime primary sponsor Pilot Flying J, as well as sponsors Cypress Associates, Allstate Peterbilt, Northland Oil & Lubricants, Switch Hitch, Sherwin-Williams, TMC Transportation, Multiprens USA and EFS (Electronic Funds Source), to drive a second HSM car full-time after running his rookie season with Tommy Baldwin Racing. The car number was later revealed to be No. 46 and Jay Guy was announced as crew chief. Annett finished 13th at the season-opening Daytona 500. He failed to qualify for next race at Atlanta, one of 13 drivers to not pass inspection and set a time during qualifying. Shortly after, HScott was given a second chance after Xfinity Series regular Brian Scott gave up his seat in the No. 33 Circle Sport Racing Chevrolet. The car was wrapped in Pilot Flying J colors, and Circle Sport owner Joe Falk was credited with owner's points under NASCAR rules. During the 2015 season, Annett had a rough season and he also missed the fall Talladega race. Other than Daytona, Annett's best finish was 23rd at Bristol, Kansas and Martinsville. Annett finished 36th in points with the 46 finishing 38th in Owner points.

Annett returned for 2016, with primary sponsorship from Pilot Flying J and sponsorship from Allstate Peterbilt, Northland Oil & Lubricants, Multiprens USA and EFS (Electronic Funds Source). At Watkins Glen, the 46 featured the St. Jude Iowa Tournament of Hope. HScott entering into an agreement for a short-term lease of Premium Motorsports' charter, guaranteeing a starting spot for the team and Annett in every race. In July, HSM in an attempt to improve performance hired Mike Hillman Jr. as the 46's crew chief. Annett missed the August Bristol race due to flu-like symptoms and was replaced by Justin Allgaier, who finished 40th after a crash. Annett and HSM struggled all season with a best finish of 20th in July at Daytona and they finished 36th in points. On November 5, Annett and his sponsors announced that they were leaving HSM for JR Motorsports in 2017. HScott Motorsports would shut down in December.

=== Car No. 46 results ===
Year	Driver	No.	Make	1	2	3	4	5	6	7	8	9	10	11	12	13	14	15	16	17	18	19	20	21	22	23	24	25	26	27	28	29	30	31	32	33	34	35	36	Owners	Pts
2014	Bobby Labonte	52	Chevy	DAY; 15	PHO	LVS	BRI	CAL	MAR	TEX	DAR	RCH	TAL	KAN	CLT	DOV	POC	MCH	SON	KEN	DAY	NHA	IND	POC	GLN	MCH	BRI	ATL	RCH	CHI	NHA	DOV	KAN	CLT	TAL	MAR	TEX	PHO	HOM	46th	54
2015	Michael Annett	46	Chevy	DAY; 13	ATL; DNQ	LVS; 39	PHO; 42	CAL; 38	MAR; 39	TEX; 40	BRI; 23	RCH; 33	TAL; 29	KAN; 23	CLT; 32	DOV; 41	POC; 34	MCH; 30	SON; 33	DAY; 37	KEN; 30	NHA; 36	IND; 30	POC; 26	GLN; 31	MCH; 35	BRI; 43	DAR; 39	RCH; 43	CHI; 34	NHA; 29	DOV; 37	CLT; 25	KAN; 34	TAL; DNQ	MAR; 23	TEX; 31	PHO; 32	HOM; 30	38th	398
2016	Michael Annett	46	Chevy	DAY; 27	ATL; 30	LVS; 30	PHO; 33	CAL; 29	MAR; 35	TEX; 32	BRI; 31	RCH; 36	TAL; 38	KAN; 32	DOV; 37	CLT; 36	POC; 38	MCH; 28	SON; 36	DAY; 20	KEN; 26	NHA; 38	IND; 28	POC; 29	GLN; 37		MCH; 33	DAR; 28	RCH; 31	CHI; 33	NHA; 40	DOV; 33	CLT; 24	KAN; 32	TAL; 33	MAR; 35	TEX; 32	PHO; 26	HOM; 28	36th	329
2016	Justin Allgaier	46	Chevy																							BRI; 40														36th	329

== Xfinity Series ==
=== HScott Motorsports with Chip Ganassi ===
==== Car No. 42 history ====
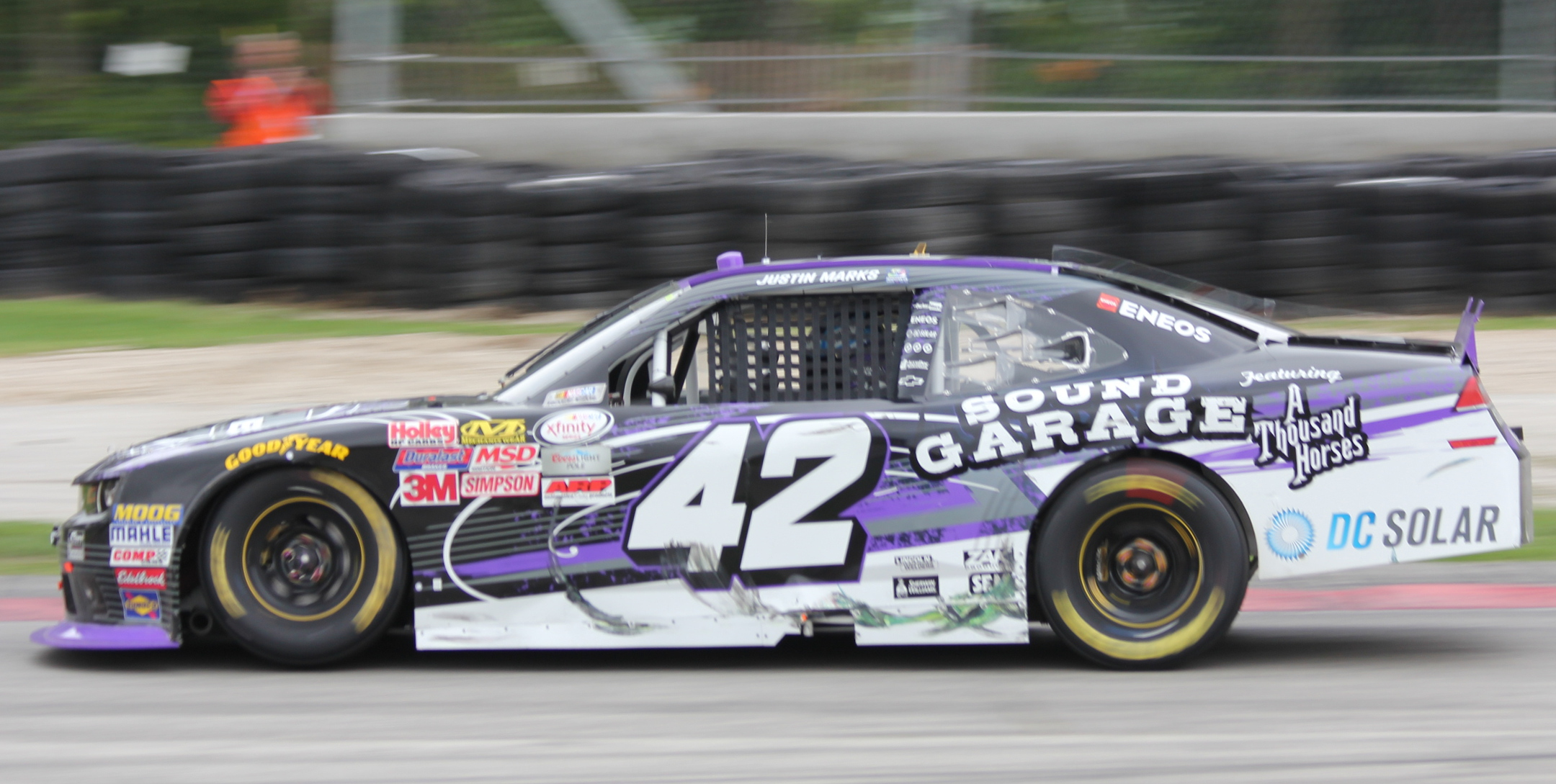
The No. 42, driven by Justin Marks, at Road America in 2015

Following financial issues with co-owner Steve Turner that led to the dissolution of Turner Scott Motorsports, Scott found a new partner in the team, Chip Ganassi (whose drivers Kyle Larson and Dylan Kwasniewski drove for TSM), to field a single Xfinity Series entry under the name HScott Motorsports with Chip Ganassi. The team (led by crew chief Mike Shiplett) ran out of the Chip Ganassi Racing shop, with Larson, Brennan Poole, and Justin Marks sharing the ride. Kwasniewski did not return to the team due to lack of sponsorship. Larson began with an eighth-place finish at the season opener at Daytona. Poole made his Xfinity Series debut at Las Vegas, finishing ninth. The team had some struggles during this season, but Larson managed to win the season finale at Homestead, after leading 118 laps and passing Austin Dillon with four laps to go. Larson had sponsorship during the season from Eneos (eight races), ParkerStore (two races), Crest (two races), Accu-Doc Solutions and Dixie Chopper/Big Machine Records. Larson would also finish the season with four top-fives and nine top-tens while leading 175 laps. Poole would run 17 races with DC Solar sponsorship and he had top-tens at Las Vegas (9th) and Loudon (tenth). Marks would run the road course races at Mid-Ohio (Linksys sponsored, finished 15th) and Road America (Ganassi Sound Garage sponsored, finished seventh). The 42 would finish 15th in Owners points.

The team became fully operated by Ganassi for 2016.

==== Car No. 42 results ====
Year	Driver	No.	Make	1	2	3	4	5	6	7	8	9	10	11	12	13	14	15	16	17	18	19	20	21	22	23	24	25	26	27	28	29	30	31	32	33	Owners	Pts
2015	Kyle Larson	42	Chevy	DAY; 8	ATL; 10			CAL; 7						CLT; 33		MCH; 3					IND; 7		GLN; 28		BRI; 2		DAR; 7		CHI; 22		DOV; 5			TEX; 33	PHO; 15	HOM; 1*	15th	942
2015	Brennan Poole	42	Chevy			LVS; 9	PHO; 26		TEX; 13	BRI; 11	RCH; 13	TAL; 28	IOW; 38		DOV; 12		CHI; 17	DAY; 36	KEN; 12	NHA; 10		IOW; 14						RCH; 11		KEN; 32		CLT; 21	KAN; 13				15th	942
2015	Justin Marks	42	Chevy																					MOH; 15		ROA; 7											15th	942

== K&N Pro Series ==
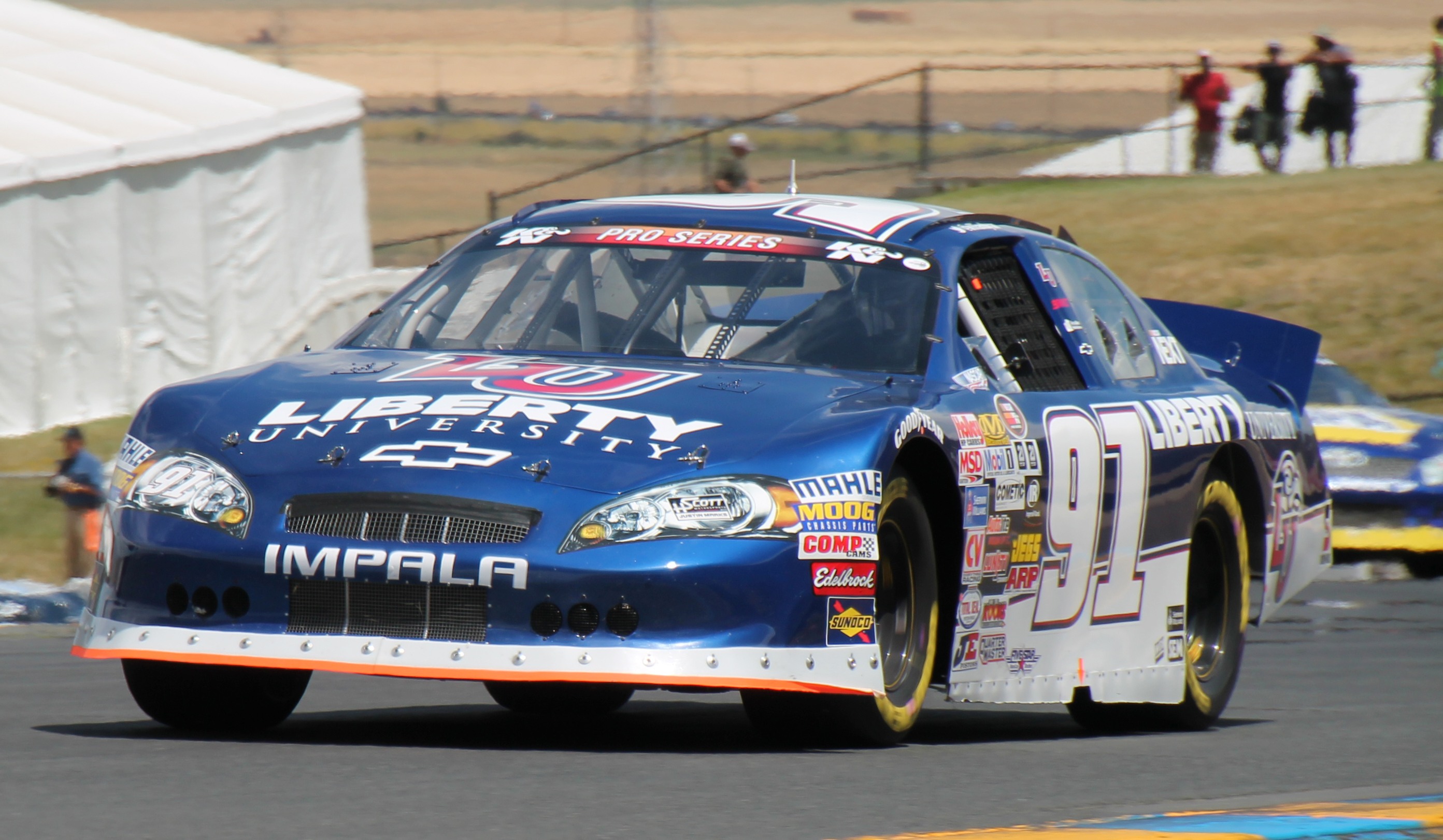
William Byron at Sonoma in the K&N Pro Series West in 2015.

For 2015, Harry Scott Jr. took control of the K&N Pro Series East operation of the now-defunct Turner Scott Motorsports. Scott partnered with Justin Marks to field five Chevrolet teams under the name HScott Motorsports with Justin Marks with returning driver Scott Heckert (#34 Project Lifesaver) and rookies William Byron (#9 Liberty University), Justin Haley (#5 Braun Auto), and Dalton Sargeant (#51 Galt). Following his win at the Chili Bowl Midget Nationals, 22-year-old Rico Abreu was signed to drive the team's 98 car (Accu-Doc Solutions/GoPro Motorplex) in January 2015. Byron scored four wins and three poles en route to the 2015 series championship. Heckert (two wins/two poles) finished second in points, Sargeant finished fourth in points, Abreu (one win/three poles) finished fifth in points and Haley finished sixth in points.

2015 featured HScott Motorsports with Justin Marks sending three Chevrolet teams (#52 Galt- Dalton Sargeant, #91 Liberty University- William Byron, #05 Braun Auto Group- Justin Haley) to compete in the K&N Pro Series West at Sonoma and Phoenix. Respectively Sargeant would finish second/fourth, Byron would finish fifth/second and Haley would finish third/21st along with winning the pole at Phoenix.

In 2016, the East program added Harrison Burton, the son of NASCAR on NBC commentator and former driver Jeff Burton, who began driving the No. 12 DEX Imaging/Konica Minolta Chevrolet for the team.

The team added Tyler Dippel (#38 East West Marine/TyCar) and Hunter Baize (#13 Bicycle Playing Cards/Pine Mountain Firelogs), who competed for Rookie of the Year alongside Burton. Haley (#5 Braun Auto Group) returned in 2016 and ended the year as the 2016 series champion after winning two races, two poles with 13 top-fives and finishing in the top ten in all 14 races, the only driver to do so in series history. Dippel (one win) finished third in points, Baize finished fourth in points and Burton (one pole) finished seventh in points.

On December 5, 2016, HScott Motorsports announced that with no viable driver/sponsor options for 2017 that it was closing its Cup operation. In conjunction with that the K&N operation also shut down.

== ARCA Racing Series ==
In 2015, HSM would field Justin Haley in a limited schedule in the No. 74 Braun Auto Group/BraunAbility Chevrolet in the ARCA Racing Series. He would run at IRP and twice at Salem Speedway. The team's best start was a second at Salem with a best finish of fourth happening at Salem and IRP.
