= 2016 Food City 500 =

Race details
- Race 8 of 36 in the 2016 NASCAR Sprint Cup Series
- The 2016 Food City 500 program cover, featuring the new Colossus TV that Bristol Motor Speedway installed.
- Date: April 17, 2016
- Location: Bristol Motor Speedway in Bristol, Tennessee
- Course: Permanent racing facility
- Course length: 0.533 miles (0.858 km)
- Distance: 500 laps, 266.5 mi (429 km)
- Weather: Clear blue skies with a temperature of 72 °F (22 °C); wind out of the east at 2 mph (3.2 km/h)
- Average speed: 81.637 miles per hour (131.382 km/h)

Pole position
Driver	Carl Edwards	Joe Gibbs Racing
- Time: 14.991

Most laps led
Driver	Carl Edwards	Joe Gibbs Racing
- Laps: 276

Winner
No. 19	Carl Edwards	Joe Gibbs Racing

Television in the United States
- Network: Fox
- Announcers: Mike Joy, Darrell Waltrip and Jeff Gordon

Radio in the United States
- Radio: PRN
- Booth announcers: Doug Rice, Mark Garrow and Wendy Venturini
- Turn announcers: Rob Albright (Backstretch)

The 2016 Food City 500 was a NASCAR Sprint Cup Series race that was held on April 17, 2016, at Bristol Motor Speedway in Bristol, Tennessee. Contested over 500 laps on the 0.533 miles (0.858 km) concrete short track, it is the eighth race of the 2016 NASCAR Sprint Cup Series season, The race had 16 lead changes among different drivers and fifteen cautions for 102 laps.

== Report ==
=== Background ===
A variation of the race logo used for the 2016 Food City 500.

Bristol Motor Speedway (formerly known as the Bristol International Raceway from 1978 to 1996 and as the Bristol International Speedway from 1961 to 1978) is a 0.533-mile (0.858 km) oval short track in Bristol, Tennessee. Entering the race, Kyle Busch leads the points with 259, while Jimmie Johnson is 6 points back, Kevin Harvick is 7 points back, Carl Edwards is 18 points back, and Joey Logano is 25 points back.

=== Entry list ===
The entry list for the Food City 500 was released on Monday, April 11 at 11:39 a.m. Eastern time. Forty cars are entered for the race.

No.	Driver	Team	Manufacturer
1	Jamie McMurray	Chip Ganassi Racing	Chevrolet
2	Brad Keselowski	Team Penske	Ford
3	Austin Dillon	Richard Childress Racing	Chevrolet
4	Kevin Harvick	Stewart–Haas Racing	Chevrolet
5	Kasey Kahne	Hendrick Motorsports	Chevrolet
6	Trevor Bayne	Roush Fenway Racing	Ford
7	Regan Smith	Tommy Baldwin Racing	Chevrolet
10	Danica Patrick	Stewart–Haas Racing	Chevrolet
11	Denny Hamlin	Joe Gibbs Racing	Toyota
13	Casey Mears	Germain Racing	Chevrolet
14	Ty Dillon (i)	Stewart–Haas Racing	Chevrolet
15	Clint Bowyer	HScott Motorsports	Chevrolet
16	Greg Biffle	Roush Fenway Racing	Ford
17	Ricky Stenhouse Jr.	Roush Fenway Racing	Ford
18	Kyle Busch	Joe Gibbs Racing	Toyota
19	Carl Edwards	Joe Gibbs Racing	Toyota
20	Matt Kenseth	Joe Gibbs Racing	Toyota
21	Ryan Blaney (R)	Wood Brothers Racing	Ford
22	Joey Logano	Team Penske	Ford
23	David Ragan	BK Racing	Toyota
24	Chase Elliott (R)	Hendrick Motorsports	Chevrolet
27	Paul Menard	Richard Childress Racing	Chevrolet
30	Josh Wise	The Motorsports Group	Chevrolet
31	Ryan Newman	Richard Childress Racing	Chevrolet
32	Jeffrey Earnhardt (R)	Go FAS Racing	Ford
34	Chris Buescher (R)	Front Row Motorsports	Ford
38	Landon Cassill	Front Row Motorsports	Ford
41	Kurt Busch	Stewart–Haas Racing	Chevrolet
42	Kyle Larson	Chip Ganassi Racing	Chevrolet
43	Aric Almirola	Richard Petty Motorsports	Ford
44	Brian Scott (R)	Richard Petty Motorsports	Ford
46	Michael Annett	HScott Motorsports	Chevrolet
47	A. J. Allmendinger	JTG Daugherty Racing	Chevrolet
48	Jimmie Johnson	Hendrick Motorsports	Chevrolet
55	Reed Sorenson	Premium Motorsports	Chevrolet
78	Martin Truex Jr.	Furniture Row Racing	Toyota
83	Matt DiBenedetto	BK Racing	Toyota
88	Dale Earnhardt Jr.	Hendrick Motorsports	Chevrolet
95	Michael McDowell	Circle Sport – Leavine Family Racing	Chevrolet
98	Cole Whitt	Premium Motorsports	Chevrolet
Official entry list

== Practice ==
=== First practice ===
Denny Hamlin was the fastest in the first practice session with a time of 14.913 and a speed of 128.666 mph (207.068 km/h).

Pos	No.	Driver	Team	Manufacturer	Time	Speed
1	11	Denny Hamlin	Joe Gibbs Racing	Toyota	14.913	128.666
2	78	Martin Truex Jr.	Furniture Row Racing	Toyota	14.944	128.399
3	2	Brad Keselowski	Team Penske	Ford	14.970	128.374
Official first practice results

=== Second practice ===
Kyle Busch was the fastest in the second practice session with a time of 15.184 and a speed of 126.370 mph (203.373 km/h).

Pos	No.	Driver	Team	Manufacturer	Time	Speed
1	18	Kyle Busch	Joe Gibbs Racing	Toyota	15.184	126.370
2	24	Chase Elliott (R)	Hendrick Motorsports	Chevrolet	15.196	126.253
3	41	Kurt Busch	Stewart–Haas Racing	Chevrolet	15.212	126.137
Official second practice results

=== Final practice ===
Denny Hamlin was the fastest in the final practice session with a time of 15.213 and a speed of 126.129 mph (202.985 km/h).

Pos	No.	Driver	Team	Manufacturer	Time	Speed
1	11	Denny Hamlin	Joe Gibbs Racing	Toyota	15.213	126.129
2	24	Chase Elliott (R)	Hendrick Motorsports	Chevrolet	15.250	125.823
3	78	Martin Truex Jr.	Furniture Row Racing	Toyota	15.259	125.749
Official final practice results

== Qualifying ==
Carl Edwards scored the pole for the race with a time of 14.991 and a speed of 127.997 mph (205.991 km/h). He said afterwards that winning the pole was "just awesome. This place is really complicated and my guys did a good job making the car drive well on all different segments.” Matt Kenseth, who qualified second, said that he was "just a little off. These guys did a great job with our Dollar General Camry today. Obviously, all of the JGR cars were fast again so thanks to everyone who’s building these things and TRD (Toyota Racing Development) with the engines. In the first round we were pretty good we thought and then the second round we tried something and we were too tight and then the third round we were a little too loose really. We were just that much off, but overall it was a great day and we’ll still get a good pit stop and a good place to start and hopefully we’ll get it driving good tomorrow and we can race them on Sunday.” During round 1, Ty Dillon got loose exiting turn 3 and slammed into the back of Landon Cassill.

=== Qualifying results ===
Pos	No.	Driver	Team	Manufacturer	R1	R2	R3
1	19	Carl Edwards	Joe Gibbs Racing	Toyota	14.974	15.129	14.991
2	20	Matt Kenseth	Joe Gibbs Racing	Toyota	15.002	15.137	15.059
3	22	Joey Logano	Team Penske	Ford	14.943	15.080	15.086
4	11	Denny Hamlin	Joe Gibbs Racing	Toyota	14.996	15.165	15.132
5	18	Kyle Busch	Joe Gibbs Racing	Toyota	15.046	15.078	15.162
6	48	Jimmie Johnson	Hendrick Motorsports	Chevrolet	15.126	15.166	15.173
7	4	Kevin Harvick	Stewart–Haas Racing	Chevrolet	15.145	15.178	15.215
8	78	Martin Truex Jr.	Furniture Row Racing	Toyota	15.106	15.239	15.226
9	47	A. J. Allmendinger	JTG Daugherty Racing	Chevrolet	15.165	15.290	15.251
10	6	Trevor Bayne	Roush Fenway Racing	Ford	15.155	15.277	15.251
11	5	Kasey Kahne	Hendrick Motorsports	Chevrolet	15.212	15.281	15.261
12	2	Brad Keselowski	Team Penske	Ford	15.098	15.160	15.266
13	1	Jamie McMurray	Chip Ganassi Racing	Chevrolet	15.052	15.291	—
14	27	Paul Menard	Richard Childress Racing	Chevrolet	15.154	15.294	—
15	3	Austin Dillon	Richard Childress Racing	Chevrolet	15.061	15.297	—
16	13	Casey Mears	Germain Racing	Chevrolet	15.122	15.299	—
17	31	Ryan Newman	Richard Childress Racing	Chevrolet	15.221	15.307	—
18	21	Ryan Blaney (R)	Wood Brothers Racing	Ford	15.068	15.310	—
19	24	Chase Elliott (R)	Hendrick Motorsports	Chevrolet	15.154	15.334	—
20	88	Dale Earnhardt Jr.	Hendrick Motorsports	Chevrolet	15.186	15.344	—
21	34	Chris Buescher (R)	Front Row Motorsports	Ford	15.208	15.351	—
22	43	Aric Almirola	Richard Petty Motorsports	Ford	15.166	15.353	—
23	16	Greg Biffle	Roush Fenway Racing	Ford	15.139	15.400	—
24	23	David Ragan	BK Racing	Toyota	15.188	15.417	—
25	42	Kyle Larson	Chip Ganassi Racing	Chevrolet	15.226	—	—
26	41	Kurt Busch	Stewart–Haas Racing	Chevrolet	15.249	—	—
27	44	Brian Scott (R)	Richard Petty Motorsports	Ford	15.256	—	—
28	38	Landon Cassill	Front Row Motorsports	Ford	15.268	—	—
29	7	Regan Smith	Tommy Baldwin Racing	Chevrolet	15.272	—	—
30	83	Matt DiBenedetto	BK Racing	Toyota	15.278	—	—
31	95	Michael McDowell	Circle Sport – Leavine Family Racing	Chevrolet	15.316	—	—
32	17	Ricky Stenhouse Jr.	Roush Fenway Racing	Ford	15.325	—	—
33	10	Danica Patrick	Stewart–Haas Racing	Chevrolet	15.350	—	—
34	14	Ty Dillon (i)	Stewart–Haas Racing	Chevrolet	15.427	—	—
35	30	Josh Wise	The Motorsports Group	Chevrolet	15.444	—	—
36	15	Clint Bowyer	HScott Motorsports	Chevrolet	15.456	—	—
37	32	Jeffrey Earnhardt (R)	Go FAS Racing	Ford	15.561	—	—
38	55	Reed Sorenson	Premium Motorsports	Chevrolet	15.569	—	—
39	98	Cole Whitt	Premium Motorsports	Chevrolet	15.625	—	—
40	46	Michael Annett	HScott Motorsports	Chevrolet	15.694	—	—
Official qualifying results

== Race ==
=== First half ===
==== Start ====
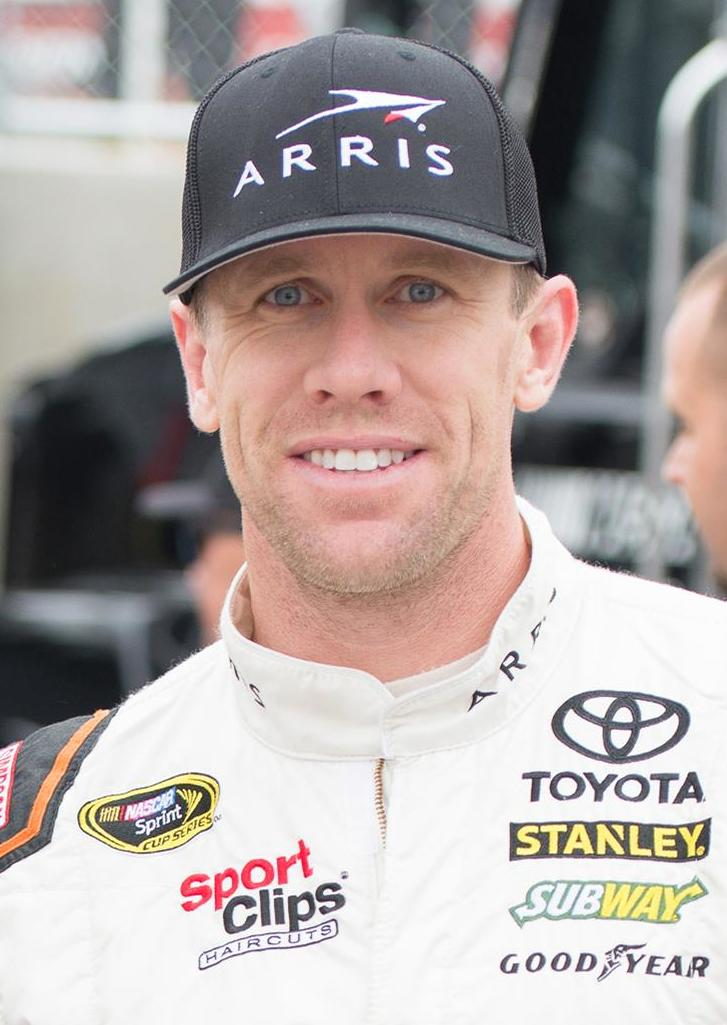
Carl Edwards won the race from the pole position.

Under clear skies, Carl Edwards led the field to the green flag at 1:19 p.m. Dale Earnhardt Jr. made an unscheduled stop on the first lap after reporting he had no power. “Yeah, we got the Roush system on our cars for the stuck throttle issue, and just warming the brakes up I engaged that system to kill the throttle,” Earnhardt said. “I was warming the brakes up like I always do, and apparently I applied too much pressure and it killed the motor. If your throttle is stuck and you mash the brake, you’re going to mash the [expletive] out of that brake when the throttle sticks. It will shut the motor off.” He rejoined the race in 40th two laps down. It only took 25 laps for Edwards to run into lapped traffic. This allowed Joey Logano to pull up to him and make a run on him. He was unable to pass him on the bottom and fell back. Logano caught Edwards behind a lapped car and passed him for the lead on lap 39. Matt Kenseth passed Logano to take the lead on lap 45. The first caution of the race flew on lap 52 for a single-car wreck in turn 2. Rounding the turn, Kyle Busch suffered a right-front tire blowout and slammed the wall. Kenseth and Logano swapped the lead on pit road, but Kenseth exited with the lead. Jimmie Johnson and Brad Keselowski were tagged for speeding and David Ragan was tagged for crew over the wall too soon. All three restarted the race from the tail-end of the field.

The race restarted on lap 59. The second caution of the race flew on lap 70 for a single-car wreck on the backstretch. Exiting turn 2, Ricky Stenhouse Jr. got loose and spun out.

The race restarted on lap 78. Logano made an unscheduled stop for a vibration on lap 109. To add insult to injury, he was tagged for an uncontrolled tire and was forced to serve a pass-through penalty. The third caution of the race flew for a single-car spin in turn 2. Busch got turned by Chris Buescher. Kenseth and Edwards traded the lead on pit road, but Kenseth exited with the lead. Ragan was tagged for having too many men over the wall and restarted the race from the tail-end of the field.

==== Second quarter ====
The race restarted on lap 122. The fourth caution of the race flew on lap 147 for a single-car wreck involving Kyle Larson.

The race restarted on lap 155. The fifth caution of the race flew on lap 187 for a single-car wreck in turn 2 involving race leader Kenseth who suffered a tire blowout and slammed the wall. This handed the lead back to Edwards.

The race restarted on lap 195. The sixth caution of the race flew on lap 219 after Ragan lost an engine in turn 4. Greg Biffle and Austin Dillon were tagged for speeding and restarted the race from the tail-end of the field.

The race restarted on lap 227. The seventh caution of the race flew on lap 259 for a single-car wreck in turn 2. Rounding the turn, Busch slammed the wall for the third time. Landon Cassill opted not to pit and assumed the lead.

=== Second half ===
==== Halfway ====
The race restarted on lap 274. Edwards got under Cassill and retook the lead on lap 282. Johnson was running third when he made and unscheduled stop on lap 302. He rejoined the race in 31st two laps down. Kevin Harvick took the lead from Edwards on lap 320. The eighth caution of the race flew on lap 331 for a single-car wreck in turn 1 involving Josh Wise. Harvick swapped the lead with Edwards on pit road and Edwards exited in the lead.

The race restarted on lap 338. The ninth caution of the race flew for a single-car spin in turn 2. Entering turn 1, Casey Mears got tapped in the side by A. J. Allmendinger and sent him spinning.

The race restarted on lap 345. The tenth caution of the race flew on lap 349 for a single-car wreck in turn 2 involving Brian Scott.

The race restarted on lap 356. Kurt Busch cleared Edwards exiting turn 4 to take the lead on lap 357. Keselowski was running fourth when he made an unscheduled stop on lap 389. He rejoined the race in 27th two laps down. Edwards passed Busch in turn 2 to retake the lead on lap 399. The 11th caution of the race flew with 90 laps to go after Hamlin slammed the wall exiting turn 2. Larson was tagged for speeding and restarted the race from the tail-end of the field.

==== Fourth quarter ====
The race restarted with 84 laps to go. The 12th caution of the race flew with 63 laps to go for a single-car wreck in turn 4. Rounding turn 3, Martin Truex Jr. got into the side of Aric Almirola and sent him spinning into the wall.

The race restarted with 52 laps to go. The 13th caution of the race flew with 40 laps to go for a two-car wreck in turn 2 involving Cassill and Ty Dillon.

The race restarted with 34 laps to go. The 14th caution of the race flew with 15 laps to go for a single-car spin on the backstretch involving Michael Annett.

The race restarted with 10 laps to go. The 15th caution of the race flew with eight laps to go for a single-car spin on the backstretch involving Regan Smith.

The race restarted with five laps to go and Edwards drove on to score the victory.

== Post-race ==
=== Driver comments ===
“There were so many different things happening out there,” Edwards said. “Different guys were fast at different times. I have to work on my drag racing stuff, Kurt (Busch) has those restarts figured out. He was tough. Just awesome. This is a real testament to my team. The guys have been working really hard. We’ve got Comcast Business folks here and they helped put this whole thing together with ARRIS and Toyota, TRD, Stanley – all the folks that made this 19 team happen. Just great and so awesome. Thanks to Sprint and Cessna and all the folks that make this happen. Now we’re in the Chase and we can go have some fun. Just so cool, awesome to be here.”

== Race results ==
Pos	No.	Driver	Team	Manufacturer	Laps	Points
1	19	Carl Edwards	Joe Gibbs Racing	Toyota	500	45
2	88	Dale Earnhardt Jr.	Hendrick Motorsports	Chevrolet	500	39
3	41	Kurt Busch	Stewart–Haas Racing	Chevrolet	500	39
4	24	Chase Elliott (R)	Hendrick Motorsports	Chevrolet	500	37
5	6	Trevor Bayne	Roush Fenway Racing	Ford	500	36
6	83	Matt DiBenedetto	BK Racing	Toyota	500	35
7	4	Kevin Harvick	Stewart–Haas Racing	Chevrolet	500	35
8	15	Clint Bowyer	HScott Motorsports	Chevrolet	500	33
9	31	Ryan Newman	Richard Childress Racing	Chevrolet	500	32
10	22	Joey Logano	Team Penske	Ford	500	32
11	21	Ryan Blaney (R)	Wood Brothers Racing	Ford	500	30
12	16	Greg Biffle	Roush Fenway Racing	Ford	500	29
13	1	Jamie McMurray	Chip Ganassi Racing	Chevrolet	500	28
14	78	Martin Truex Jr.	Furniture Row Racing	Toyota	500	27
15	27	Paul Menard	Richard Childress Racing	Chevrolet	500	27
16	17	Ricky Stenhouse Jr.	Roush Fenway Racing	Ford	500	25
17	5	Kasey Kahne	Hendrick Motorsports	Chevrolet	500	24
18	2	Brad Keselowski	Team Penske	Ford	500	23
19	47	A. J. Allmendinger	JTG Daugherty Racing	Chevrolet	500	22
20	11	Denny Hamlin	Joe Gibbs Racing	Toyota	500	21
21	34	Chris Buescher (R)	Front Row Motorsports	Ford	500	20
22	38	Landon Cassill	Front Row Motorsports	Ford	500	20
23	48	Jimmie Johnson	Hendrick Motorsports	Chevrolet	499	18
24	13	Casey Mears	Germain Racing	Chevrolet	499	17
25	14	Ty Dillon (i)	Stewart–Haas Racing	Chevrolet	499	0
26	3	Austin Dillon	Richard Childress Racing	Chevrolet	498	15
27	10	Danica Patrick	Stewart–Haas Racing	Chevrolet	498	14
28	98	Cole Whitt	Premium Motorsports	Chevrolet	496	13
29	95	Michael McDowell	Circle Sport – Leavine Family Racing	Chevrolet	495	12
30	44	Brian Scott (R)	Richard Petty Motorsports	Ford	493	11
31	46	Michael Annett	HScott Motorsports	Chevrolet	492	10
32	32	Jeffrey Earnhardt (R)	Go FAS Racing	Ford	488	9
33	30	Josh Wise	The Motorsports Group	Chevrolet	482	8
34	43	Aric Almirola	Richard Petty Motorsports	Ford	479	7
35	42	Kyle Larson	Chip Ganassi Racing	Chevrolet	462	6
36	20	Matt Kenseth	Joe Gibbs Racing	Toyota	460	6
37	7	Regan Smith	Tommy Baldwin Racing	Chevrolet	451	4
38	18	Kyle Busch	Joe Gibbs Racing	Toyota	258	3
39	23	David Ragan	BK Racing	Toyota	211	2
40	55	Reed Sorenson	Premium Motorsports	Chevrolet	169	1
Official race results

=== Race summary ===
- Lead changes: 16
- Cautions/Laps: 15 for 102
- Red flags: 0
- Time of race: 3 hours, 15 minutes and 52 seconds
- Average speed: 81.637 miles per hour (131.382 km/h)

== Media ==
=== Television ===
Fox Sports covered their sixteenth race at the Bristol Motor Speedway. Mike Joy, five-time Bristol winner Jeff Gordon and 12-time Bristol winner – and all-time Bristol race winner – Darrell Waltrip will have the call in the booth for the race. Jamie Little, Chris Neville, Vince Welch and Matt Yocum will handle the pit road duties for the television side with Peyton Manning making a guest appearance.

Fox Sports 1 Television
Booth announcers	Pit reporters
Lap-by-lap: Mike Joy; Color-commentator: Jeff Gordon; Color commentator: Darrell Waltrip	Jamie Little; Chris Neville; Vince Welch; Matt Yocum

=== Radio ===
PRN had the radio call for the race which will also be simulcasted on Sirius XM NASCAR Radio. Doug Rice, Mark Garrow and Wendy Venturini will call the race in the booth when the field is racing down the frontstretch. Rob Albright called the race from atop the turn 3 suites when the field raced down the backstretch. Brad Gillie, Brett Mcmillan, Jim Noble, and Steve Richards covered the action on pit lane.

PRN Radio
Booth announcers	Turn announcers	Pit reporters
Lead announcer: Doug Rice; Announcer: Mark Garrow; Announcer: Wendy Venturini	Backstretch: Rob Albright	Brad Gillie; Brett McMillan; Jim Noble; Steve Richards

== Standings after the race ==
Drivers' Championship standings

	Pos	Driver	Points
2	1	Kevin Harvick	287
2	2	Carl Edwards	286 (–1)
1	3	Jimmie Johnson	271 (–16)
1	4	Joey Logano	266 (–21)
4	5	Kyle Busch	262 (–25)
	6	Dale Earnhardt Jr.	250 (–37)
	7	Kurt Busch	247 (–40)
1	8	Brad Keselowski	224 (–63)
1	9	Denny Hamlin	222 (–65)
1	10	Martin Truex Jr.	214 (–73)
1	11	Austin Dillon	213 (–74)
2	12	Chase Elliott (R)	205 (–82)
	13	Jamie McMurray	199 (–88)
1	14	A. J. Allmendinger	188 (–99)
1	15	Kasey Kahne	185 (–102)
3	16	Ryan Newman	182 (–105)
Official driver's standings

Manufacturers' Championship standings

Pos	Manufacturer	Points
1	Toyota	335
2	Chevrolet	327 (–8)
3	Ford	290 (–45)
Official manufacturers' standings

- Note: Only the first sixteen positions are included for the driver standings.
  . – Driver has clinched a Chase position.

Previous race: 2016 Duck Commander 500	Sprint Cup Series; 2016 season	Next race: 2016 Toyota Owners 400
