= 2014 Quicken Loans Race for Heroes 500 =

Race details
- Race 35 of 36 in the 2014 NASCAR Sprint Cup Series
- Date: November 9, 2014
- Location: Phoenix International Raceway in Avondale, Arizona
- Course: Permanent racing facility
- Course length: 1 miles (1.6 km)
- Distance: 312 laps, 312 mi (502.115 km)
- Weather: Sunny with a temperature of 83 °F (28 °C); wind out of the east at 7 miles per hour (11 km/h)
- Average speed: 99.991 miles per hour (160.920 km/h)

Pole position
Driver	Denny Hamlin	Joe Gibbs Racing
- Time: 25.332

Most laps led
Driver	Kevin Harvick	Stewart–Haas Racing
- Laps: 264

Winner
No. 4	Kevin Harvick	Stewart–Haas Racing

Television in the United States
- Network: ESPN & MRN
- Announcers: Allen Bestwick, Dale Jarrett, and Andy Petree (Television); Joe Moore and Jeff Striegle (Booth); Dan Hubbard (Backstretch) (Radio)
- Nielsen ratings: 3.1/7 (Finals); 2.8/6 (Overnights); 5.091 Million viewers

The 2014 Quicken Loans Race for Heroes 500 was a NASCAR Sprint Cup Series stock car race held on November 9, 2014, at Phoenix International Raceway in Avondale, Arizona. Contested over 312 laps, it was the 35th and penultimate race of the 2014 NASCAR Sprint Cup Series season, as well as the ninth race in the Chase for the Sprint Cup. Kevin Harvick dominated the race on his way to scoring the win. Jeff Gordon finished second while Matt Kenseth, Brad Keselowski, and Denny Hamlin rounded out the top five. The top rookies of the race were Kyle Larson (13th), Michael Annett (26th), and Alex Bowman (32nd).

== Report ==
=== Background ===
Phoenix International Raceway, also known as PIR, is a one-mile, low-banked tri-oval race track located in Avondale, Arizona. The motorsport track opened in 1964 and currently hosts two NASCAR race weekends annually. PIR has also hosted the IndyCar Series, CART, USAC and the Rolex Sports Car Series. The raceway is currently owned and operated by International Speedway Corporation. The raceway was originally constructed with a 2.5 miles (4.0 km) road course that ran both inside and outside of the main tri-oval. In 1991 the track was reconfigured with the current 1.51 miles (2.43 km) interior layout. PIR has an estimated grandstand seating capacity of around 67,000. Lights were installed around the track in 2004 following the addition of a second annual NASCAR race weekend.

=== Entry list ===
Forty-four drivers were entered for the race.

No.	Driver	Team	Manufacturer
1	Jamie McMurray	Chip Ganassi Racing	Chevrolet
2	Brad Keselowski (PC2) (CC)	Team Penske	Ford
3	Austin Dillon (R)	Richard Childress Racing	Chevrolet
4	Kevin Harvick (CC)	Stewart–Haas Racing	Chevrolet
5	Kasey Kahne	Hendrick Motorsports	Chevrolet
7	Michael Annett (R)	Tommy Baldwin Racing	Chevrolet
9	Marcos Ambrose	Richard Petty Motorsports	Ford
10	Danica Patrick	Stewart–Haas Racing	Chevrolet
11	Denny Hamlin (CC)	Joe Gibbs Racing	Toyota
13	Casey Mears	Germain Racing	Chevrolet
14	Tony Stewart (PC3)	Stewart–Haas Racing	Chevrolet
15	Clint Bowyer	Michael Waltrip Racing	Toyota
16	Greg Biffle	Roush Fenway Racing	Ford
17	Ricky Stenhouse Jr.	Roush Fenway Racing	Ford
18	Kyle Busch	Joe Gibbs Racing	Toyota
20	Matt Kenseth (PC5) (CC)	Joe Gibbs Racing	Toyota
22	Joey Logano (CC)	Team Penske	Ford
23	Alex Bowman (R)	BK Racing	Toyota
24	Jeff Gordon (PC6) (CC)	Hendrick Motorsports	Chevrolet
26	Cole Whitt (R)	BK Racing	Toyota
27	Paul Menard	Richard Childress Racing	Chevrolet
31	Ryan Newman (CC)	Richard Childress Racing	Chevrolet
32	Joey Gase (i)	Go FAS Racing	Ford
33	Ty Dillon (i)	Richard Childress Racing	Chevrolet
34	David Ragan	Front Row Motorsports	Ford
36	Reed Sorenson	Tommy Baldwin Racing	Chevrolet
37	Mike Bliss (i)	Tommy Baldwin Racing	Chevrolet
38	David Gilliland	Front Row Motorsports	Ford
40	Landon Cassill (i)	Hillman–Circle Sport	Chevrolet
41	Kurt Busch (PC4)	Stewart–Haas Racing	Chevrolet
42	Kyle Larson (R)	Chip Ganassi Racing	Chevrolet
43	Aric Almirola	Richard Petty Motorsports	Ford
47	A. J. Allmendinger	JTG Daugherty Racing	Chevrolet
48	Jimmie Johnson (PC1)	Hendrick Motorsports	Chevrolet
51	Justin Allgaier (R)	HScott Motorsports	Chevrolet
55	Brian Vickers	Michael Waltrip Racing	Toyota
66	Mike Wallace (i)	Identity Ventures Racing	Toyota
75	Clay Rogers	Beard Motorsports	Chevrolet
78	Martin Truex Jr.	Furniture Row Racing	Chevrolet
83	J. J. Yeley (i)	BK Racing	Toyota
88	Dale Earnhardt Jr.	Hendrick Motorsports	Chevrolet
95	Michael McDowell	Leavine Family Racing	Ford
98	Josh Wise	Phil Parsons Racing	Chevrolet
99	Carl Edwards (CC)	Roush Fenway Racing	Ford
Official entry list

Key	Meaning
(R)	Rookie
(i)	Ineligible for points
(PC#)	Past champions provisional
(CC)	Chase Contender

== Practice and qualifying ==
Kevin Harvick was the fastest in the first practice session with a time of 25.438 and a speed of 141.521 miles per hour (227.756 km/h). Denny Hamlin won the pole with a new track record time of 25.332 and a speed of 142.113 mph (228.709 km/h). “We showed up today and had decent speed in race trim, not great speed but decent speed,” said Hamlin after his third pole of the season. “But we didn't show decent speed in qualifying and it just shows today that it's possible. We’ve got it in our car. We just gotta get for 312 laps now.” "Kevin (Harvick) probably has a 10th on everyone," Kez says. "We probably have a second or third place car." "You're either going to hit a walk off, or you're just going to race next weekend," said Harvick, who is last in the Chase standings and 18 points out of the lead. Clay Rogers failed to qualify for the race. Kevin Harvick was the fastest in the second practice session with a time of 26.011 and a speed of 138.403 mph (222.738 km/h). Jamie McMurray was the fastest in the final practice session with a time of 26.257 and a speed of 137.106 mph (220.651 km/h).

=== Qualifying Results ===
Pos	No.	Driver	Team	Manufacturer	R1	R2
1	11	Denny Hamlin	Joe Gibbs Racing	Toyota	25.426	25.332
2	2	Brad Keselowski	Team Penske	Ford	25.468	25.338
3	4	Kevin Harvick	Stewart–Haas Racing	Chevrolet	25.506	25.353
4	22	Joey Logano	Team Penske	Ford	25.327	25.389
5	20	Matt Kenseth	Joe Gibbs Racing	Toyota	25.539	25.389
6	18	Kyle Busch	Joe Gibbs Racing	Toyota	25.533	25.393
7	24	Jeff Gordon	Hendrick Motorsports	Chevrolet	25.520	25.412
8	42	Kyle Larson (R)	Chip Ganassi Racing	Chevrolet	25.475	25.474
9	55	Brian Vickers	Michael Waltrip Racing	Toyota	25.521	25.480
10	41	Kurt Busch	Stewart–Haas Racing	Chevrolet	25.560	25.498
11	27	Paul Menard	Richard Childress Racing	Chevrolet	25.587	25.552
12	13	Casey Mears	Germain Racing	Chevrolet	25.607	25.761
13	99	Carl Edwards	Roush Fenway Racing	Ford	25.625	—
14	78	Martin Truex Jr.	Furniture Row Racing	Chevrolet	25.639	—
15	48	Jimmie Johnson	Hendrick Motorsports	Chevrolet	25.649	—
16	88	Dale Earnhardt Jr.	Hendrick Motorsports	Chevrolet	25.662	—
17	15	Clint Bowyer	Michael Waltrip Racing	Toyota	25.679	—
18	17	Ricky Stenhouse Jr.	Roush Fenway Racing	Ford	25.680	—
19	1	Jamie McMurray	Chip Ganassi Racing	Chevrolet	25.685	—
20	31	Ryan Newman	Richard Childress Racing	Chevrolet	25.691	—
21	9	Marcos Ambrose	Richard Petty Motorsports	Ford	25.706	—
22	5	Kasey Kahne	Hendrick Motorsports	Chevrolet	25.720	—
23	43	Aric Almirola	Richard Petty Motorsports	Ford	25.722	—
24	47	A. J. Allmendinger	JTG Daugherty Racing	Chevrolet	25.761	—
25	3	Austin Dillon (R)	Richard Childress Racing	Chevrolet	25.770	—
26	33	Ty Dillon	Richard Childress Racing	Chevrolet	25.819	—
27	51	Justin Allgaier (R)	HScott Motorsports	Chevrolet	25.826	—
28	16	Greg Biffle	Roush Fenway Racing	Ford	25.836	—
29	14	Tony Stewart	Stewart–Haas Racing	Chevrolet	25.863	—
30	7	Michael Annett (R)	Tommy Baldwin Racing	Chevrolet	25.880	—
31	95	Michael McDowell	Leavine Family Racing	Ford	25.923	—
32	10	Danica Patrick	Stewart–Haas Racing	Chevrolet	25.927	—
33	36	Reed Sorenson	Tommy Baldwin Racing	Chevrolet	25.957	—
34	38	David Gilliland	Front Row Motorsports	Ford	26.029	—
35	34	David Ragan	Front Row Motorsports	Ford	26.034	—
36	98	Josh Wise	Phil Parsons Racing	Chevrolet	26.098	—
37	23	Alex Bowman (R)	BK Racing	Toyota	26.110	—
38	40	Landon Cassill	Hillman–Circle Sport	Chevrolet	26.114	—
39	37	Mike Bliss	Tommy Baldwin Racing	Chevrolet	26.179	—
40	26	Cole Whitt (R)	BK Racing	Toyota	26.197	—
41	83	J. J. Yeley	BK Racing	Toyota	26.307	—
42	32	Joey Gase	Go FAS Racing	Ford	26.432	—
43	66	Mike Wallace	Identity Ventures Racing	Toyota	26.848	—
Did not qualify
44	75	Clay Rogers	Beard Motorsports	Chevrolet	26.218	—

== Race ==
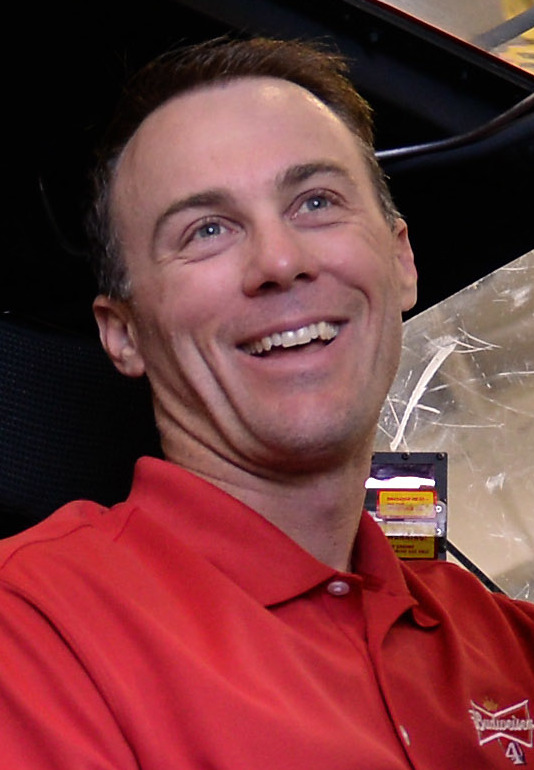
Kevin Harvick won the race.

The race was scheduled to begin at 3:15 PM Eastern time, but started five minutes late at 3:20 when Denny Hamlin led the field to the green flag. Thanks to Kevin Harvick splitting the middle in turn 4, Joey Logano took the lead from Hamlin on lap 25. The first caution of the race flew on lap 31 for debris on the backstretch. Denny Hamlin exited pit road in fourth, but came back down for a flat right-rear tire. David Ragan stayed out to lead two laps before pitting. The race restarted on lap 36 with Logano leading the way. Kevin Harvick took the lead on lap 44. Casey Mears was running twelfth when his right-rear tire blew out on the dogleg, went spinning, made light contact with the inside wall towards turn 3 and brought out the second caution of the race on lap 81. Dale Earnhardt Jr. won the race off pit road by taking two tires and assumed the lead. The race restarted on lap 88. Earnhardt wasn't the leader for long as Kevin Harvick took back the lead on the restart. Debris on the front-stretch brought out the third caution of the race on lap 96. The race restarted on lap 101. The fourth caution of the race flew on lap 123 for debris in turn 1. Joey Logano beat Harvick off pit road, but was forced to restart from the end of the longest line for equipment leaving the pit box. The race restarted on lap 128 with Harvick leading the way. The fifth caution of the race flew on lap 185 after Austin Dillon had a right-front tire blowout in turn 3. The race restarted on lap 192. Debris in turn 1 brought out the sixth caution of the race on lap 201. The race restarted on lap 206 and caution flew for the seventh time after Josh Wise was turned by Ty Dillon and rear-ended the wall in turn 4. The race restarted on lap 212. Kyle Busch got loose in turn 1, tagged the wall in 2 with the right-rear corner panel, came down and clipped Clint Bowyer and sent him head first into the backstretch wall. Cole Whitt also was taken out in an unrelated chain-reaction after rear-ending Casey Mears. These two wrecks brought out the eighth caution of the race. Because of all the bits and pieces on the track in turn 2, the race was red flagged on lap 216. It was lifted after four minutes. The race restarted on lap 221. The ninth caution of the race flew on lap 237 after Jimmie Johnson went high in turn 1 and just rode the wall. The race restarted with 69 laps to go. The tenth caution of the race flew with 68 laps to go when Jamie McMurray was turned in turn 2. The race restarted with 64 laps to go. Debris on the front-stretch brought out the eleventh caution of the race with 25 laps to go. The race restarted with 20 laps to go. The twelfth caution of the race flew with 16 laps to go when Landon Cassill had a left-rear tire blowout and rear-ended the wall in turn 4. Mike Wallace spun out trying to avoid him. The race restarted with twelve laps to go. Kevin Harvick dominated the race to score the victory. "Wow. I guess that's what it feels like to hit a walkoff in extra innings. I mean this thing -- both races here -- has been bad to the bone," Harvick said after winning his fourth race at this 1-mile oval in the last five tries. Harvick would not have made the final four to race for the title without a win. I could tell that we were going to have to win because everybody was running in the front of the pack that we were racing against. I think this says a lot about our team. We had our backs against the wall. We're in victory lane and we get to go on." In the final turn, Ryan Newman sent Kyle Larson into the wall to secure his place in the championship race. “I just gave it my all,” Newman said. “I wasn’t proud of it but did what I had to get to this next round. That little boy has got a lot of things coming in this sport and he used me up like that in a truck at Eldora a couple years ago. From my standpoint, I call it even but I think if he was in my position, he’d have done the same thing.” "Coming to the finish, there were a lot of cars racing really hard,” said Larson today. “I knew (Newman) was right around me and knew he needed to gain some spots to keep from getting eliminated from the Chase. It's a little upsetting he pushed me up to the wall, but I completely understand the situation he was in,” said Larson, “(I) can't fault him for being aggressive there. I think a lot of drivers out here would have done something similar if they were in that position." Kevin Harvick (with the much-needed win), Joey Logano, Denny Hamlin, and Ryan Newman were the four drivers who will race for the championship, which also meant that NASCAR will be having a new Sprint Cup Series champion. Jeff Gordon, Carl Edwards, Brad Keselowski, and Matt Kenseth were the four drivers eliminated.

== Race results ==
Pos	No.	Driver	Team	Manufacturer	Laps	Points
1	4	Kevin Harvick	Stewart–Haas Racing	Chevrolet	312	48
2	24	Jeff Gordon	Hendrick Motorsports	Chevrolet	312	42
3	20	Matt Kenseth	Joe Gibbs Racing	Toyota	312	41
4	2	Brad Keselowski	Team Penske	Ford	312	40
5	11	Denny Hamlin	Joe Gibbs Racing	Toyota	312	40
6	22	Joey Logano	Team Penske	Ford	312	39
7	41	Kurt Busch	Stewart–Haas Racing	Chevrolet	312	37
8	88	Dale Earnhardt Jr.	Hendrick Motorsports	Chevrolet	312	37
9	16	Greg Biffle	Roush Fenway Racing	Ford	312	35
10	9	Marcos Ambrose	Richard Petty Motorsports	Ford	312	34
11	31	Ryan Newman	Richard Childress Racing	Chevrolet	312	33
12	78	Martin Truex Jr.	Furniture Row Racing	Chevrolet	312	32
13	42	Kyle Larson (R)	Chip Ganassi Racing	Chevrolet	312	31
14	1	Jamie McMurray	Chip Ganassi Racing	Chevrolet	312	30
15	99	Carl Edwards	Roush Fenway Racing	Ford	312	29
16	47	A. J. Allmendinger	JTG Daugherty Racing	Chevrolet	312	28
17	17	Ricky Stenhouse Jr.	Roush Fenway Racing	Ford	312	27
18	43	Aric Almirola	Richard Petty Motorsports	Ford	312	26
19	55	Brian Vickers	Michael Waltrip Racing	Toyota	312	25
20	14	Tony Stewart	Stewart–Haas Racing	Chevrolet	312	24
21	5	Kasey Kahne	Hendrick Motorsports	Chevrolet	312	23
22	10	Danica Patrick	Stewart–Haas Racing	Chevrolet	312	22
23	27	Paul Menard	Richard Childress Racing	Chevrolet	312	21
24	38	David Gilliland	Front Row Motorsports	Ford	312	20
25	34	David Ragan	Front Row Motorsports	Ford	312	20
26	7	Michael Annett (R)	Tommy Baldwin Racing	Chevrolet	311	19
27	33	Ty Dillon	Richard Childress Racing	Chevrolet	310	0
28	36	Reed Sorenson	Tommy Baldwin Racing	Chevrolet	310	16
29	40	Landon Cassill	Hillman–Circle Sport	Chevrolet	310	0
30	83	J. J. Yeley	BK Racing	Toyota	309	0
31	95	Michael McDowell	Leavine Family Racing	Ford	309	13
32	23	Alex Bowman (R)	BK Racing	Toyota	308	12
33	32	Joey Gase	Go FAS Racing	Ford	308	0
34	18	Kyle Busch	Joe Gibbs Racing	Toyota	308	10
35	13	Casey Mears	Germain Racing	Chevrolet	305	9
36	66	Mike Wallace	Identity Ventures Racing	Toyota	303	0
37	51	Justin Allgaier (R)	HScott Motorsports	Chevrolet	302	7
38	3	Austin Dillon (R)	Richard Childress Racing	Chevrolet	283	6
39	48	Jimmie Johnson	Hendrick Motorsports	Chevrolet	235	5
40	15	Clint Bowyer	Michael Waltrip Racing	Toyota	211	4
41	98	Josh Wise	Phil Parsons Racing	Chevrolet	204	3
42	26	Cole Whitt (R)	BK Racing	Toyota	147	2
43	37	Mike Bliss	Tommy Baldwin Racing	Chevrolet	16	0

=== Race summary ===
- 8 lead changes among different drivers
- 12 cautions for 58 laps; 1 red flag for 4 minutes
- Time of race: 3:07:13
- Kevin Harvick won his fourth race in 2014

=== Standings after the race ===
Drivers' Championship standings

	Pos	Driver	Points
1	1	Denny Hamlin	5,000
1	2	Joey Logano	5,000 (-0)
	3	Ryan Newman	5,000 (-0)
4	4	Kevin Harvick	5,000 (-0)
2	5	Brad Keselowski	2,320 (-2,680)
2	6	Jeff Gordon	2,312 (-2,688)
2	7	Matt Kenseth	2,296 (-2,704)
1	8	Kyle Busch	2,280 (-2,720)
3	9	Carl Edwards	2,278 (-2,722)
	10	Dale Earnhardt Jr.	2,271 (-2,729)
1	11	A. J. Allmendinger	2,256 (-2,744)
1	12	Greg Biffle	2,244 (-2,756)
2	13	Jimmie Johnson	2,239 (-2,761)
	14	Kurt Busch	2,229 (-2,771)
	15	Kasey Kahne	2,202 (-2,798)
	16	Aric Almirola	2,170 (-2,830)

Manufacturers' Championship standings

Pos	Manufacturer	Points
1	Chevrolet	1,572
2	Ford	1,530 (-42)
3	Toyota	1,406 (-166)

- Note: Only the first sixteen positions are included for the driver standings.

Previous race: 2014 AAA Texas 500	Sprint Cup Series; 2014 season	Next race: 2014 Ford EcoBoost 400
