= 2016 Toyota Owners 400 =

Race details
- Race 9 of 36 in the 2016 NASCAR Sprint Cup Series
- Date: April 24, 2016
- Location: Richmond International Raceway in Richmond, Virginia
- Course: Permanent racing facility
- Course length: 0.75 miles (1.2 km)
- Distance: 400 laps, 300 mi (480 km)
- Weather: Clear blue skies with a temperature of 67 °F (19 °C); wind out of the north at 6 mph (9.7 km/h)
- Average speed: 97.070 mph (156.219 km/h)

Pole position
Driver	Kevin Harvick	Stewart–Haas Racing
- Time: 20.919

Most laps led
Driver	Carl Edwards	Joe Gibbs Racing
- Laps: 154

Winner
No. 19	Carl Edwards	Joe Gibbs Racing

Television in the United States
- Network: Fox
- Announcers: Mike Joy, Jeff Gordon and Darrell Waltrip
- Nielsen ratings: 2.9/5 (Overnight); 3.1/5 (Final); 4.7 million viewers

Radio in the United States
- Radio: MRN
- Booth announcers: Joe Moore, Jeff Striegle and Rusty Wallace
- Turn announcers: Mike Bagley (Backstretch)

The 2016 Toyota Owners 400 was a NASCAR Sprint Cup Series race held on April 24, 2016, at Richmond International Raceway in Richmond, Virginia. Contested over 400 laps on the 0.75 mile (1.2 km) asphalt short track, it was the ninth race of the 2016 NASCAR Sprint Cup Series season. Carl Edwards won the race, Kyle Busch finished second, and Jimmie Johnson, Kasey Kahne and Kevin Harvick rounded out the top-five. The race had 23 lead changes among different drivers and eight cautions over 29 laps.

== Report ==
=== Background ===
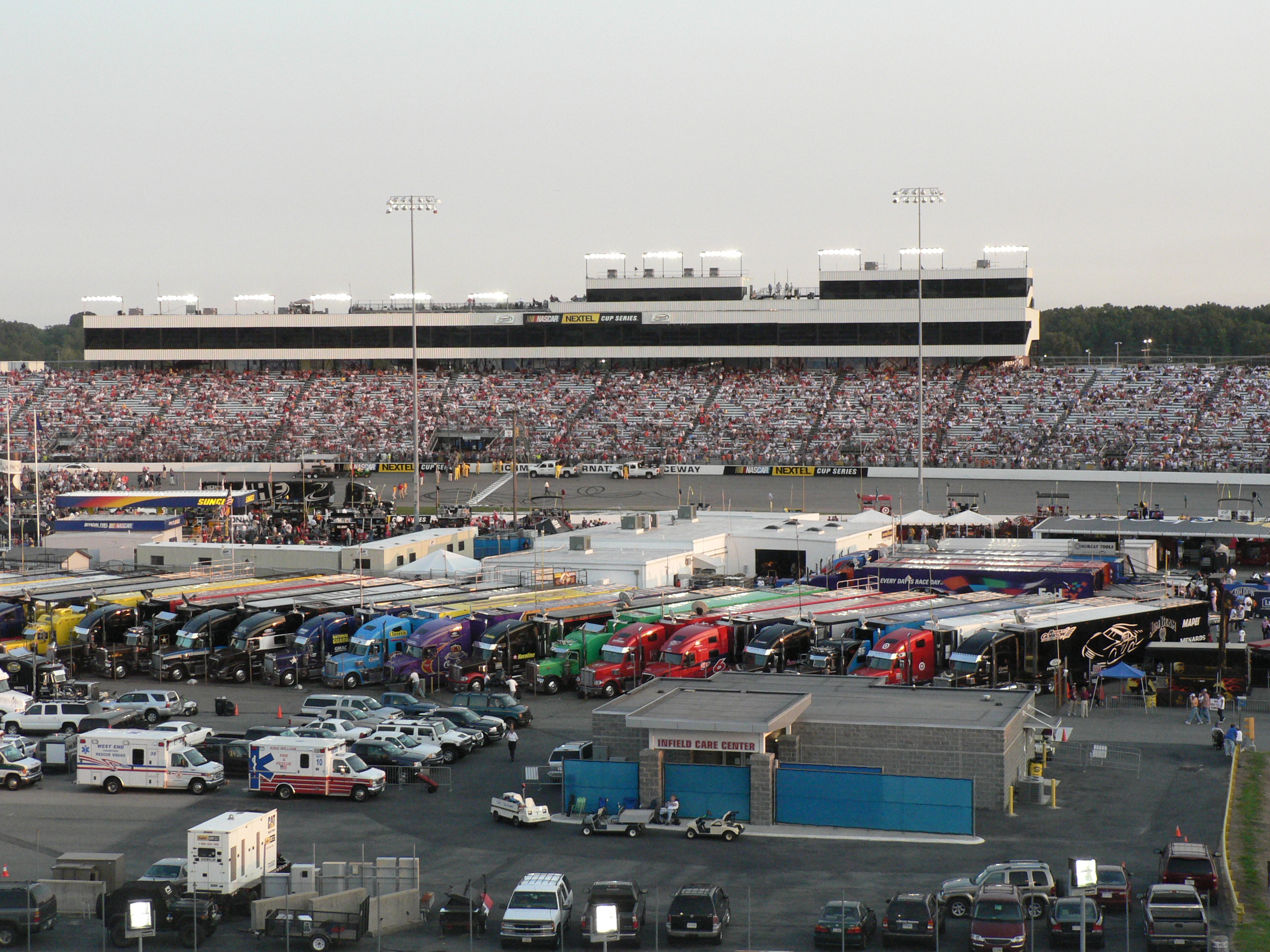
Richmond International Raceway, the track where the race was held.

Richmond International Raceway (RIR) is a 3/4-mile (1.2 km), D-shaped, asphalt race track located just outside Richmond, Virginia in Henrico County. Entering the race, Kevin Harvick leads the points with 287, while Carl Edwards is 1 points back, Jimmie Johnson is 16 points back, Joey Logano is 21 points back, and Kyle Busch is 25 points back.

=== Entry list ===
The entry list for the Toyota Owners 400 was released on Monday, April 18 at 12:58 a.m. Eastern time. Forty-one cars are entered for the race.

No.	Driver	Team	Manufacturer
1	Jamie McMurray	Chip Ganassi Racing	Chevrolet
2	Brad Keselowski	Team Penske	Ford
3	Austin Dillon	Richard Childress Racing	Chevrolet
4	Kevin Harvick	Stewart–Haas Racing	Chevrolet
5	Kasey Kahne	Hendrick Motorsports	Chevrolet
6	Trevor Bayne	Roush Fenway Racing	Ford
7	Regan Smith	Tommy Baldwin Racing	Chevrolet
10	Danica Patrick	Stewart–Haas Racing	Chevrolet
11	Denny Hamlin	Joe Gibbs Racing	Toyota
13	Casey Mears	Germain Racing	Chevrolet
14	Tony Stewart	Stewart–Haas Racing	Chevrolet
15	Clint Bowyer	HScott Motorsports	Chevrolet
16	Greg Biffle	Roush Fenway Racing	Ford
17	Ricky Stenhouse Jr.	Roush Fenway Racing	Ford
18	Kyle Busch	Joe Gibbs Racing	Toyota
19	Carl Edwards	Joe Gibbs Racing	Toyota
20	Matt Kenseth	Joe Gibbs Racing	Toyota
21	Ryan Blaney (R)	Wood Brothers Racing	Ford
22	Joey Logano	Team Penske	Ford
23	David Ragan	BK Racing	Toyota
24	Chase Elliott (R)	Hendrick Motorsports	Chevrolet
27	Paul Menard	Richard Childress Racing	Chevrolet
30	Josh Wise	The Motorsports Group	Chevrolet
31	Ryan Newman	Richard Childress Racing	Chevrolet
32	Jeffrey Earnhardt (R)	Go FAS Racing	Ford
34	Chris Buescher (R)	Front Row Motorsports	Ford
38	Landon Cassill	Front Row Motorsports	Ford
41	Kurt Busch	Stewart–Haas Racing	Chevrolet
42	Kyle Larson	Chip Ganassi Racing	Chevrolet
43	Aric Almirola	Richard Petty Motorsports	Ford
44	Brian Scott (R)	Richard Petty Motorsports	Ford
46	Michael Annett	HScott Motorsports	Chevrolet
47	A. J. Allmendinger	JTG Daugherty Racing	Chevrolet
48	Jimmie Johnson	Hendrick Motorsports	Chevrolet
55	Reed Sorenson	Premium Motorsports	Chevrolet
78	Martin Truex Jr.	Furniture Row Racing	Toyota
83	Matt DiBenedetto	BK Racing	Toyota
88	Dale Earnhardt Jr.	Hendrick Motorsports	Chevrolet
93	Ryan Ellis (i)	BK Racing	Toyota
95	Michael McDowell	Circle Sport – Leavine Family Racing	Chevrolet
98	Cole Whitt	Premium Motorsports	Chevrolet
Official entry list

== Practice ==
=== First practice ===
Kevin Harvick was the fastest in the first practice session with a time of 20.919 and a speed of 129.069 mph (207.716 km/h). The session was cut short by rain.

Pos	No.	Driver	Team	Manufacturer	Time	Speed
1	4	Kevin Harvick	Stewart–Haas Racing	Chevrolet	20.919	129.069
2	22	Joey Logano	Team Penske	Ford	20.980	128.694
3	48	Jimmie Johnson	Hendrick Motorsports	Chevrolet	21.063	128.187
Official first practice results

=== Final practice ===
Jimmie Johnson was the fastest in the final practice session with a time of 22.342 and a speed of 120.849 mph (194.488 km/h).

Pos	No.	Driver	Team	Manufacturer	Time	Speed
1	48	Jimmie Johnson	Hendrick Motorsports	Chevrolet	22.342	120.849
2	5	Kasey Kahne	Hendrick Motorsports	Chevrolet	22.384	120.622
3	18	Kyle Busch	Joe Gibbs Racing	Toyota	22.408	120.493
Official final practice results

== Qualifying ==
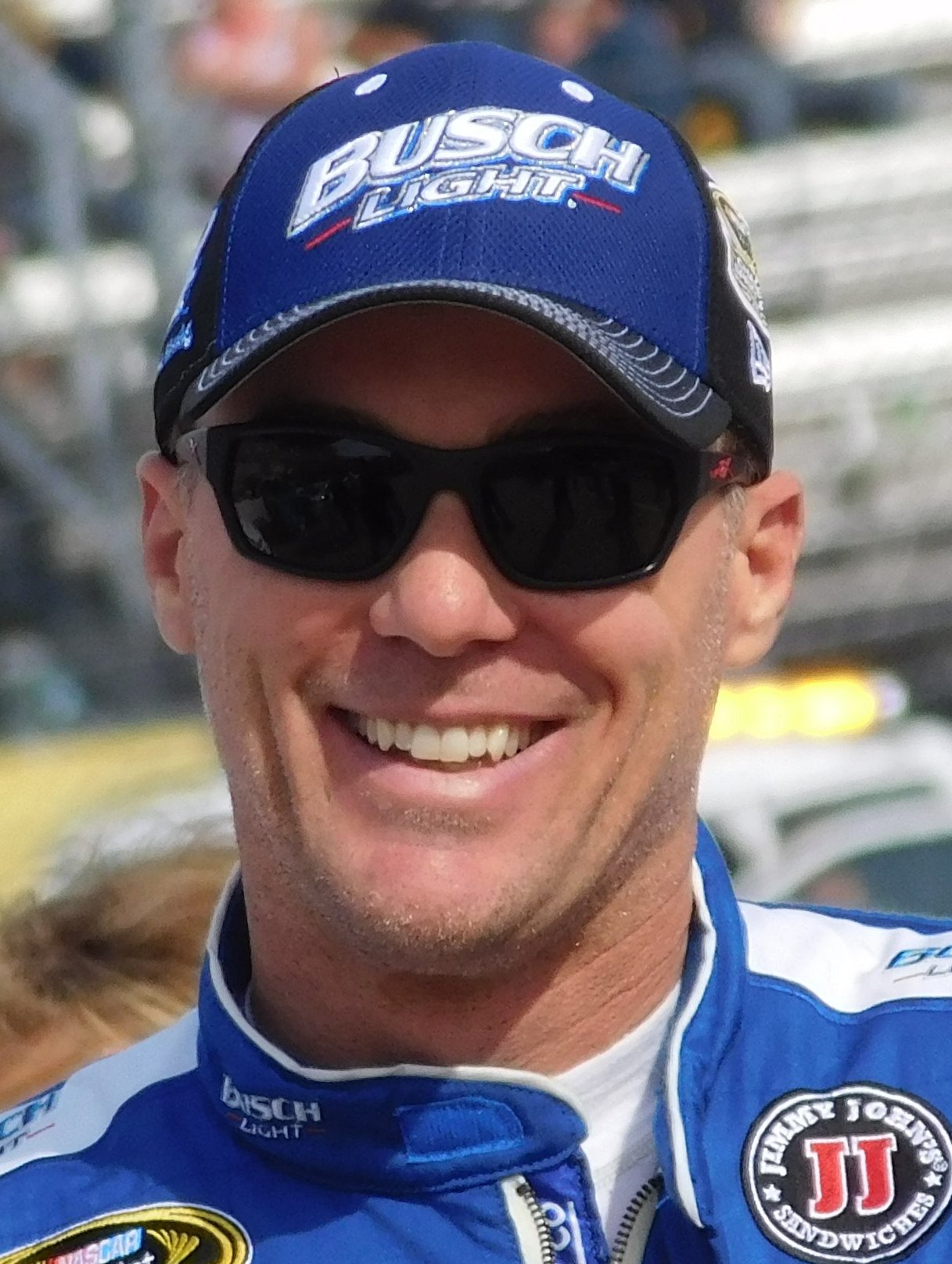
Kevin Harvick scored the pole position.

Kevin Harvick earned the pole for Sunday's race after rain washed out qualifying. He said afterwards that his team "had decided to come into the weekend and approach qualifying a little bit different, with just the way the race tracks have been and the timing of the practices. We decided to go and take advantage of being the first car on the race track, which is usually a big advantage here when the track is green and doesn't have a lot of rubber on it. It worked out today, and Rodney and everybody had a good plan, and it's going to be interesting just for the fact that, the second and third times out, the times weren't near what the first time was because the tires fall off -- which is great."

Joey Logano, who earned the second starting spot, said that he felt "like my team did a great job understanding the weather today before we hit the race track. We went out there and made our qualifying run off the truck and then focused in on race trim thinking that we weren’t going to qualifying anyway. The plan was executed perfectly besides second instead of first. Overall it is a good starting spot.”

=== Starting lineup ===
Pos	No.	Driver	Team	Manufacturer
1	4	Kevin Harvick	Stewart–Haas Racing	Chevrolet
2	22	Joey Logano	Team Penske	Ford
3	48	Jimmie Johnson	Hendrick Motorsports	Chevrolet
4	19	Carl Edwards	Joe Gibbs Racing	Toyota
5	11	Denny Hamlin	Joe Gibbs Racing	Toyota
6	2	Brad Keselowski	Team Penske	Ford
7	41	Kurt Busch	Stewart–Haas Racing	Chevrolet
8	5	Kasey Kahne	Hendrick Motorsports	Chevrolet
9	18	Kyle Busch	Joe Gibbs Racing	Toyota
10	47	A. J. Allmendinger	JTG Daugherty Racing	Chevrolet
11	3	Austin Dillon	Richard Childress Racing	Chevrolet
12	17	Ricky Stenhouse Jr.	Roush Fenway Racing	Ford
13	20	Matt Kenseth	Joe Gibbs Racing	Toyota
14	31	Ryan Newman	Richard Childress Racing	Chevrolet
15	42	Kyle Larson	Chip Ganassi Racing	Chevrolet
16	88	Dale Earnhardt Jr.	Hendrick Motorsports	Chevrolet
17	6	Trevor Bayne	Roush Fenway Racing	Ford
18	14	Tony Stewart	Stewart–Haas Racing	Chevrolet
19	16	Greg Biffle	Roush Fenway Racing	Ford
20	44	Brian Scott (R)	Richard Petty Motorsports	Ford
21	10	Danica Patrick	Stewart–Haas Racing	Chevrolet
22	78	Martin Truex Jr.	Furniture Row Racing	Toyota
23	24	Chase Elliott (R)	Hendrick Motorsports	Chevrolet
24	43	Aric Almirola	Richard Petty Motorsports	Ford
25	13	Casey Mears	Germain Racing	Chevrolet
26	27	Paul Menard	Richard Childress Racing	Chevrolet
27	1	Jamie McMurray	Chip Ganassi Racing	Chevrolet
28	38	Landon Cassill	Front Row Motorsports	Ford
29	21	Ryan Blaney (R)	Wood Brothers Racing	Ford
30	23	David Ragan	BK Racing	Toyota
31	30	Josh Wise	The Motorsports Group	Chevrolet
32	95	Michael McDowell	Circle Sport – Leavine Family Racing	Chevrolet
33	34	Chris Buescher (R)	Front Row Motorsports	Ford
34	7	Regan Smith	Tommy Baldwin Racing	Chevrolet
35	55	Reed Sorenson	Premium Motorsports	Chevrolet
36	83	Matt DiBenedetto	BK Racing	Toyota
37	93	Ryan Ellis (i)	BK Racing	Toyota
38	32	Jeffrey Earnhardt (R)	Go FAS Racing	Ford
39	15	Clint Bowyer (Note: Clint Bowyer started from the rear of the field for a transmission change.)	HScott Motorsports	Chevrolet
40	46	Michael Annett	HScott Motorsports	Chevrolet
Did not qualify
41	98	Cole Whitt	Premium Motorsports	Chevrolet
Official starting lineup

== Race ==
=== First half ===
==== Start ====
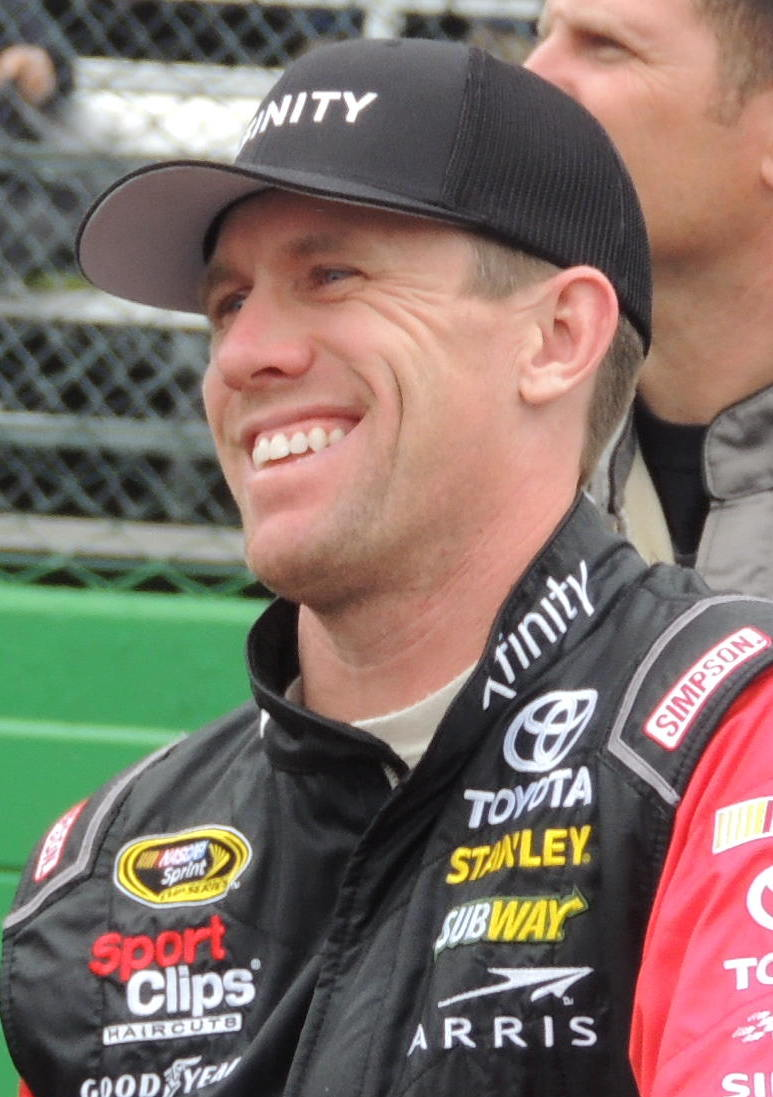
Carl Edwards won the race.

Under clear blue Virginia skies, Kevin Harvick led the field to the green flag at 1:16 p.m. After 15 laps, he pulled to seven-tenths of a second over Jimmie Johnson. By lap 20, however, Johnson reeled in Harvick and passed him on the outside going into turn 1 to take the lead on lap 21. After 10 laps, he pulled to a second and a quarter lead over Harvick. By lap 54, Carl Edwards pulled to within a quarter of a second of Johnson. After battling back and forth for nearly 10 laps, Edwards edged Johnson for the lead on lap 63. Johnson would pull back ahead to retake it the next lap. Edwards pulled ahead of Johnson the next lap to assume the lead. A number of teams began pitting on lap 85. Edwards pitted on lap 90 and handed the lead to Denny Hamlin. He pitted the next lap and handed the lead to Johnson. He pitted the next lap and handed the lead to Matt Kenseth. He pitted the next lap and the lead cycled back to Edwards.

==== Second quarter ====
After the first cycle of stops, Edwards led over Kyle Busch by two seconds. By lap 115, however, that lead had been cut by half a second. By lap 155. Busch pulled to within half a second of teammate Edwards. Debris on the backstretch brought out the first caution of the race on lap 157. Busch exited pit road with the race lead. Chris Buescher and Hamlin were tagged for an uncontrolled tire and restarted the race from the tail-end of the field.

The race restarted on lap 165. Edwards spun the tires on the restart and Busch pulled away. Edwards, however, reeled him back in and took back the lead on lap 169. Debris on the backstretch brought out the second caution of the race on lap 195.

=== Second half ===
==== Halfway ====
The race restarted on lap 203. By lap 231, Harvick reeled in and passed Edwards for the lead. After 15 laps, he pulled away to a two and three-quarter second lead over Edwards. Debris in turn 2 brought out the third caution of the race on lap 251. It came from the shredded tire of the No. 23 car of David Ragan.

The race restarted on lap 258. The fourth caution of the race flew on lap 268 for a single-car incident in turn 2. After cutting down his left-rear, Tony Stewart suffered a blowout and slowed down on the track. Brad Keselowski opted not to pit and assumed the lead.

The race restarted on lap 275. After going back and forth for three laps, Kurt Busch passed Keselowski for the lead. Brother Kyle passed him for the lead on lap 287. Debris in turns 1 and 2 brought out the fifth caution of the race with 88 laps to go. Kurt Busch exited pit road with the race lead.

==== Fourth quarter ====
The race restarted with 82 laps to go. The sixth caution of the race flew one lap later for a single-car spin in turn 4. Exiting the turn, Ryan Newman suffered a left-rear tire blowout and spun out.

The race restarted with 75 laps to go and the seventh caution of the race flew just after the restart for a spin by Ryan Ellis after being turned by Landon Cassill.

The race restarted with 66 to go. The eighth caution of the race flew with 42 laps to go for a single-car spin in turn 4 involving Brian Scott. Kyle Busch exited pit road with the race lead.

The race restarted with 36 laps to go. Rounding turn 4, Edwards bumped Busch out of the lead and scored the victory.

== Post-race ==
=== Driver comments ===
Edwards said in victory lane that Kyle Busch is "an amazing teammate and it’s like he got really slow there at the end. Something happened that last lap. It was like his rear tires went off or something. He went down into (turn) one and I dove it in and I got to him and I thought, ‘Man, I’ve got something.’ And he went to get down to the bottom and park it in three and four and I had already decided to go down there so I thought, ‘Man, I’m going to give him a little nudge,’ and we both have got wins and we’re racing for fun getting these trophies and just an awesome day.”

“It's racing, I guess,” Busch said. “We had a really great car. We were fast - maybe not as good as Carl on the long run. The guys gave me everything we needed today. We lost it there on the second-to-last run, but we had a shot to win and that's all that matters."

== Race results ==
Pos	No.	Driver	Team	Manufacturer	Laps	Points
1	19	Carl Edwards	Joe Gibbs Racing	Toyota	400	45
2	18	Kyle Busch	Joe Gibbs Racing	Toyota	400	40
3	48	Jimmie Johnson	Hendrick Motorsports	Chevrolet	400	39
4	5	Kasey Kahne	Hendrick Motorsports	Chevrolet	400	37
5	4	Kevin Harvick	Stewart–Haas Racing	Chevrolet	400	37
6	11	Denny Hamlin	Joe Gibbs Racing	Toyota	400	36
7	20	Matt Kenseth	Joe Gibbs Racing	Toyota	400	35
8	22	Joey Logano	Team Penske	Ford	400	33
9	78	Martin Truex Jr.	Furniture Row Racing	Toyota	400	32
10	41	Kurt Busch	Stewart–Haas Racing	Chevrolet	400	32
11	2	Brad Keselowski	Team Penske	Ford	400	31
12	24	Chase Elliott (R)	Hendrick Motorsports	Chevrolet	400	29
13	88	Dale Earnhardt Jr.	Hendrick Motorsports	Chevrolet	400	28
14	16	Greg Biffle	Roush Fenway Racing	Ford	400	27
15	42	Kyle Larson	Chip Ganassi Racing	Chevrolet	400	26
16	1	Jamie McMurray	Chip Ganassi Racing	Chevrolet	400	25
17	6	Trevor Bayne	Roush Fenway Racing	Ford	400	24
18	31	Ryan Newman	Richard Childress Racing	Chevrolet	400	23
19	14	Tony Stewart	Stewart–Haas Racing	Chevrolet	400	22
20	3	Austin Dillon	Richard Childress Racing	Chevrolet	400	21
21	43	Aric Almirola	Richard Petty Motorsports	Ford	400	20
22	27	Paul Menard	Richard Childress Racing	Chevrolet	400	19
23	23	David Ragan	BK Racing	Toyota	400	18
24	10	Danica Patrick	Stewart–Haas Racing	Chevrolet	400	17
25	47	A. J. Allmendinger	JTG Daugherty Racing	Chevrolet	400	16
26	17	Ricky Stenhouse Jr.	Roush Fenway Racing	Ford	400	15
27	38	Landon Cassill	Front Row Motorsports	Ford	399	14
28	21	Ryan Blaney (R)	Wood Brothers Racing	Ford	399	13
29	13	Casey Mears	Germain Racing	Chevrolet	399	12
30	83	Matt DiBenedetto	BK Racing	Toyota	399	11
31	95	Michael McDowell	Circle Sport – Leavine Family Racing	Chevrolet	399	10
32	7	Regan Smith	Tommy Baldwin Racing	Chevrolet	399	9
33	15	Clint Bowyer	HScott Motorsports	Chevrolet	398	8
34	34	Chris Buescher (R)	Front Row Motorsports	Ford	396	7
35	44	Brian Scott (R)	Richard Petty Motorsports	Ford	395	6
36	46	Michael Annett	HScott Motorsports	Chevrolet	394	5
37	93	Ryan Ellis (i)	BK Racing	Toyota	393	0
38	32	Jeffrey Earnhardt (R)	Go FAS Racing	Ford	392	3
39	30	Josh Wise	The Motorsports Group	Chevrolet	390	2
40	55	Reed Sorenson	Premium Motorsports	Chevrolet	390	1
Official race results

=== Race summary ===
- Lead changes: 23 among different drivers
- Cautions/Laps: 8 for 29
- Red flags: 0
- Time of race: 3 hours, 5 minutes and 26 seconds
- Average speed: 97.07 miles per hour (156.22 km/h)

== Media ==
=== Television ===
Fox Sports covered their 16th race at the Richmond International Raceway. Mike Joy, two-time Richmond winner Jeff Gordon and six-time Richmond winner Darrell Waltrip had the call in the booth for the race. Jamie Little, Vince Welch and Matt Yocum handled the pit road duties for the television side.

Fox Television
Booth announcers	Pit reporters
Lap-by-lap: Mike Joy; Color-commentator: Jeff Gordon; Color commentator: Darrell Waltrip	Jamie Little; Vince Welch; Matt Yocum

=== Radio ===
MRN will have the radio call for the race which will also be simulcast on Sirius XM NASCAR Radio. Joe Moore, Jeff Striegle and six-time Richmond winner Rusty Wallace will call the race in the booth when the field is racing down the frontstretch. Mike Bagley will call the race from a platform inside the backstretch when the field is racing down the backstretch. Kim Coon, Alex Hayden and Steve Post will work pit road for the radio side.

MRN Radio
Booth announcers	Turn announcers	Pit reporters
Lead announcer: Joe Moore; Announcer: Jeff Striegle; Announcer: Rusty Wallace	Backstretch: Mike Bagley	Kim Coon; Alex Hayden; Steve Post

== Standings after the race ==
Drivers' Championship standings

	Pos	Driver	Points
1	1	Carl Edwards	331
1	2	Kevin Harvick	324 (–7)
	3	Jimmie Johnson	310 (–21)
1	4	Kyle Busch	302 (–29)
1	5	Joey Logano	299 (–32)
1	6	Kurt Busch	279 (–52)
1	7	Dale Earnhardt Jr.	278 (–53)
1	8	Denny Hamlin	258 (–73)
1	9	Brad Keselowski	255 (–76)
	10	Martin Truex Jr.	246 (–85)
1	11	Chase Elliott (R)	234 (–97)
1	12	Austin Dillon	234 (–97)
	13	Jamie McMurray	224 (–107)
1	14	Kasey Kahne	222 (–109)
3	15	Matt Kenseth	212 (–119)
	16	Ryan Newman	205 (–126)
Official driver's standings

Manufacturers' Championship standings

Pos	Manufacturer	Points
1	Toyota	380
2	Chevrolet	366 (–14)
3	Ford	323 (–57)
Official manufacturers' standings

- Note: Only the first 16 positions are included for the driver standings.
  . – Driver has clinched a Chase position.

== Note ==
Previous race: 2016 Food City 500	Sprint Cup Series; 2016 season	Next race: 2016 GEICO 500
