= 2016 Bad Boy Off Road 300 =

Race details
- Race 28 of 36 in the 2016 NASCAR Sprint Cup Series
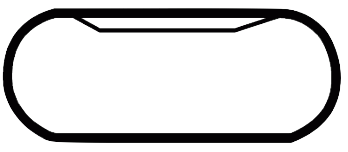
- Date: September 25, 2016
- Location: New Hampshire Motor Speedway in Loudon, New Hampshire
- Course: Permanent racing facility
- Course length: 1.058 miles (1.703 km)
- Distance: 300 laps, 317.4 mi (510.9 km)
- Average speed: 109.291 mph (175.887 km/h)

Pole position
Driver	Carl Edwards	Joe Gibbs Racing
- Time: 28.119

Most laps led
Driver	Martin Truex Jr.	Furniture Row Racing
- Laps: 141

Winner
No. 4	Kevin Harvick	Stewart–Haas Racing

Television in the United States
- Network: NBCSN
- Announcers: Rick Allen, Jeff Burton and Steve Letarte

Radio in the United States
- Radio: PRN
- Booth announcers: Mark Garrow and Brad Gillie
- Turn announcers: Rob Albright (1 & 2) and Pat Patterson (3 & 4)

The 2016 Bad Boy Off Road 300 was a NASCAR Sprint Cup Series race held on September 25, 2016, at New Hampshire Motor Speedway in Loudon, New Hampshire. Contested over 300 laps on the 1.058 mile (2.4 km) speedway, it was the 28th race of the 2016 NASCAR Sprint Cup Series season, second race of the Chase and second race of the Round of 16.

== Report ==
=== Background ===
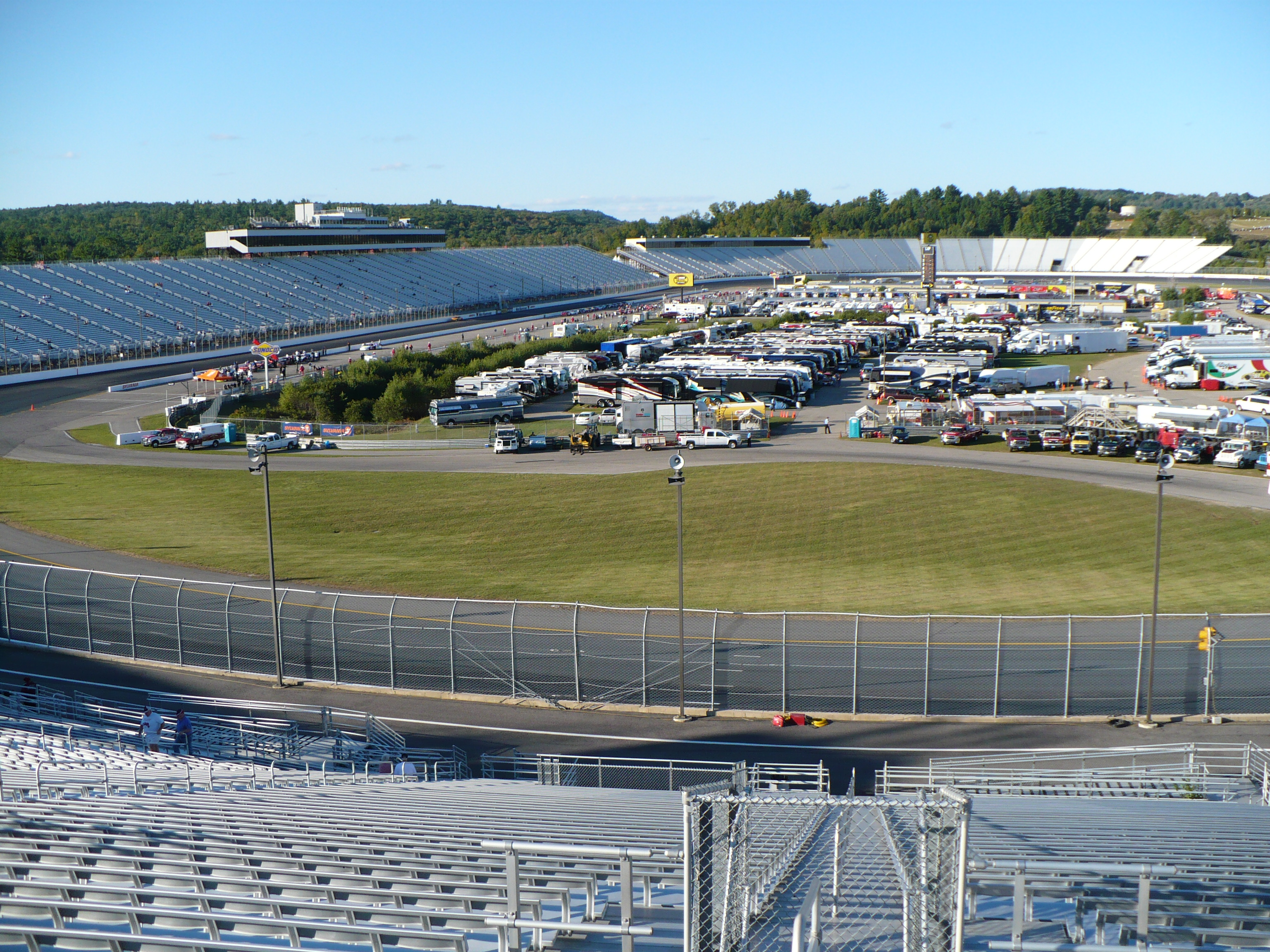
New Hampshire Motor Speedway, the track where the race was held.

New Hampshire Motor Speedway is a 1.058-mile (1.703 km) oval speedway located in Loudon, New Hampshire.

=== Entry list ===
No.	Driver	Team	Manufacturer
1	Jamie McMurray	Chip Ganassi Racing	Chevrolet
2	Brad Keselowski	Team Penske	Ford
3	Austin Dillon	Richard Childress Racing	Chevrolet
4	Kevin Harvick	Stewart–Haas Racing	Chevrolet
5	Kasey Kahne	Hendrick Motorsports	Chevrolet
6	Trevor Bayne	Roush Fenway Racing	Ford
7	Regan Smith	Tommy Baldwin Racing	Chevrolet
10	Danica Patrick	Stewart–Haas Racing	Chevrolet
11	Denny Hamlin	Joe Gibbs Racing	Toyota
13	Casey Mears	Germain Racing	Chevrolet
14	Tony Stewart	Stewart–Haas Racing	Chevrolet
15	Clint Bowyer	HScott Motorsports	Chevrolet
16	Greg Biffle	Roush Fenway Racing	Ford
17	Ricky Stenhouse Jr.	Roush Fenway Racing	Ford
18	Kyle Busch	Joe Gibbs Racing	Toyota
19	Carl Edwards	Joe Gibbs Racing	Toyota
20	Matt Kenseth	Joe Gibbs Racing	Toyota
21	Ryan Blaney (R)	Wood Brothers Racing	Ford
22	Joey Logano	Team Penske	Ford
23	David Ragan	BK Racing	Toyota
24	Chase Elliott (R)	Hendrick Motorsports	Chevrolet
27	Paul Menard	Richard Childress Racing	Chevrolet
30	Josh Wise	The Motorsports Group	Chevrolet
31	Ryan Newman	Richard Childress Racing	Chevrolet
32	Jeffrey Earnhardt (R)	Go FAS Racing	Ford
34	Chris Buescher (R)	Front Row Motorsports	Ford
38	Landon Cassill	Front Row Motorsports	Ford
41	Kurt Busch	Stewart–Haas Racing	Chevrolet
42	Kyle Larson	Chip Ganassi Racing	Chevrolet
43	Aric Almirola	Richard Petty Motorsports	Ford
44	Brian Scott (R)	Richard Petty Motorsports	Ford
46	Michael Annett	HScott Motorsports	Chevrolet
47	A. J. Allmendinger	JTG Daugherty Racing	Chevrolet
48	Jimmie Johnson	Hendrick Motorsports	Chevrolet
55	Reed Sorenson	Premium Motorsports	Chevrolet
78	Martin Truex Jr.	Furniture Row Racing	Toyota
83	Matt DiBenedetto	BK Racing	Toyota
88	Alex Bowman (i)	Hendrick Motorsports	Chevrolet
95	Michael McDowell	Circle Sport – Leavine Family Racing	Chevrolet
98	Cole Whitt	Premium Motorsports	Chevrolet
Official entry list

== Practice ==
=== First practice ===
Kyle Larson was the fastest in the first practice session with a time of 28.018 and a speed of 135.941 mph (218.776 km/h).

Pos	No.	Driver	Team	Manufacturer	Time	Speed
1	42	Kyle Larson	Chip Ganassi Racing	Chevrolet	28.018	135.941
2	24	Chase Elliott (R)	Hendrick Motorsports	Chevrolet	28.028	135.893
3	4	Kevin Harvick	Stewart–Haas Racing	Chevrolet	28.056	135.757
Official first practice results

=== Second practice ===
Kyle Larson was the fastest in the second practice session with a time of 28.814 and a speed of 132.186 mph (212.733 km/h).

Pos	No.	Driver	Team	Manufacturer	Time	Speed
1	42	Kyle Larson	Chip Ganassi Racing	Chevrolet	28.814	132.186
2	78	Martin Truex Jr.	Furniture Row Racing	Toyota	28.814	132.186
3	20	Matt Kenseth	Joe Gibbs Racing	Toyota	28.836	132.085
Official second practice results

=== Final practice ===
Kyle Larson was the fastest in the final practice session with a time of 28.729 and a speed of 132.577 mph (213.362 km/h).

Pos	No.	Driver	Team	Manufacturer	Time	Speed
1	42	Kyle Larson	Chip Ganassi Racing	Chevrolet	28.729	132.577
2	11	Denny Hamlin	Joe Gibbs Racing	Toyota	28.735	132.549
3	5	Kasey Kahne	Hendrick Motorsports	Chevrolet	28.748	132.489
Official final practice results

== Qualifying ==
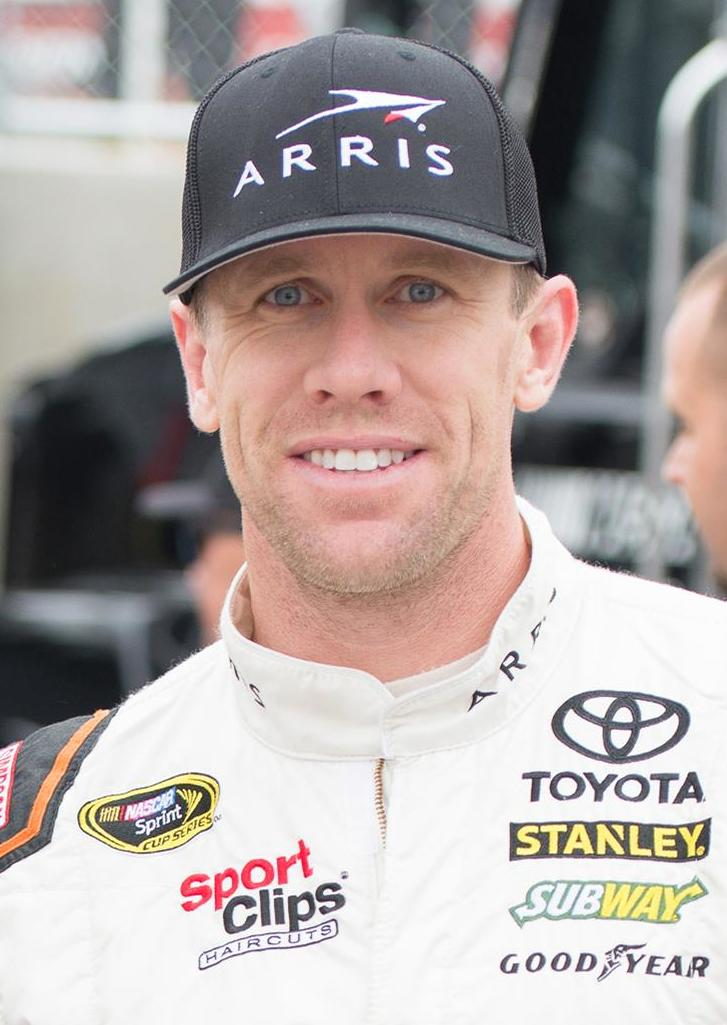
Carl Edwards scored the pole position.

Carl Edwards scored the pole for the race with a time of 28.119 and a speed of 135.453 mph (217.990 km/h). He said afterwards that his team "just give me fast race cars. We worked in qualifying trim most of our first practice this weekend and now we have to translate that speed to a good race set-up for Sunday. We’d like to come out of here with the trophy and make our way to the next round of the Chase.”

=== Qualifying results ===
Pos	No.	Driver	Team	Manufacturer	R1	R2	R3
1	19	Carl Edwards	Joe Gibbs Racing	Toyota	28.075	28.187	28.119
2	78	Martin Truex Jr.	Furniture Row Racing	Toyota	28.255	28.164	28.169
3	31	Ryan Newman	Richard Childress Racing	Chevrolet	28.256	28.343	28.235
4	48	Jimmie Johnson	Hendrick Motorsports	Chevrolet	28.234	28.186	28.243
5	11	Denny Hamlin	Joe Gibbs Racing	Toyota	28.192	28.174	28.256
6	42	Kyle Larson	Chip Ganassi Racing	Chevrolet	28.143	28.173	28.280
7	1	Jamie McMurray	Chip Ganassi Racing	Chevrolet	28.268	28.240	28.323
8	20	Matt Kenseth	Joe Gibbs Racing	Toyota	28.285	28.171	28.347
9	5	Kasey Kahne	Hendrick Motorsports	Chevrolet	28.257	28.244	28.377
10	24	Chase Elliott (R)	Hendrick Motorsports	Chevrolet	28.158	28.215	28.445
11	2	Brad Keselowski	Team Penske	Ford	28.300	28.342	28.489
12	18	Kyle Busch	Joe Gibbs Racing	Toyota	28.185	28.300	28.542
13	41	Kurt Busch	Stewart–Haas Racing	Chevrolet	28.434	28.348	
14	27	Paul Menard	Richard Childress Racing	Chevrolet	28.259	28.349	
15	22	Joey Logano	Team Penske	Ford	28.256	28.385	
16	21	Ryan Blaney (R)	Wood Brothers Racing	Ford	28.482	28.401	
17	47	A. J. Allmendinger	JTG Daugherty Racing	Chevrolet	28.333	28.417	
18	88	Alex Bowman (i)	Hendrick Motorsports	Chevrolet	28.545	28.477	
19	4	Kevin Harvick	Stewart–Haas Racing	Chevrolet	28.253	28.484	
20	95	Michael McDowell	Circle Sport – Leavine Family Racing	Chevrolet	28.500	28.609	
21	17	Ricky Stenhouse Jr.	Roush Fenway Racing	Ford	28.640	28.631	
22	14	Tony Stewart	Stewart–Haas Racing	Chevrolet	28.371	28.642	
23	23	David Ragan	BK Racing	Toyota	28.387	28.686	
24	10	Danica Patrick	Stewart–Haas Racing	Chevrolet	28.608	28.895	
25	44	Brian Scott (R)	Richard Petty Motorsports	Ford	28.645		
26	43	Aric Almirola	Richard Petty Motorsports	Ford	28.662		
27	6	Trevor Bayne	Roush Fenway Racing	Ford	28.705		
28	34	Chris Buescher (R)	Front Row Motorsports	Ford	28.720		
29	3	Austin Dillon	Richard Childress Racing	Chevrolet	28.725		
30	7	Regan Smith	Tommy Baldwin Racing	Chevrolet	28.727		
31	13	Casey Mears	Germain Racing	Chevrolet	28.749		
32	16	Greg Biffle	Roush Fenway Racing	Ford	28.816		
33	93	Matt DiBenedetto	BK Racing	Toyota	28.865		
34	38	Landon Cassill	Front Row Motorsports	Ford	28.937		
35	46	Michael Annett	HScott Motorsports	Chevrolet	28.958		
36	98	Cole Whitt	Premium Motorsports	Chevrolet	28.962		
37	15	Clint Bowyer	HScott Motorsports	Chevrolet	29.068		
38	55	Reed Sorenson	Premium Motorsports	Chevrolet	29.143		
39	30	Josh Wise	The Motorsports Group	Chevrolet	29.411		
40	32	Jeffrey Earnhardt (R)	Go FAS Racing	Ford	29.826		
Official qualifying results

== Race ==
=== First half ===
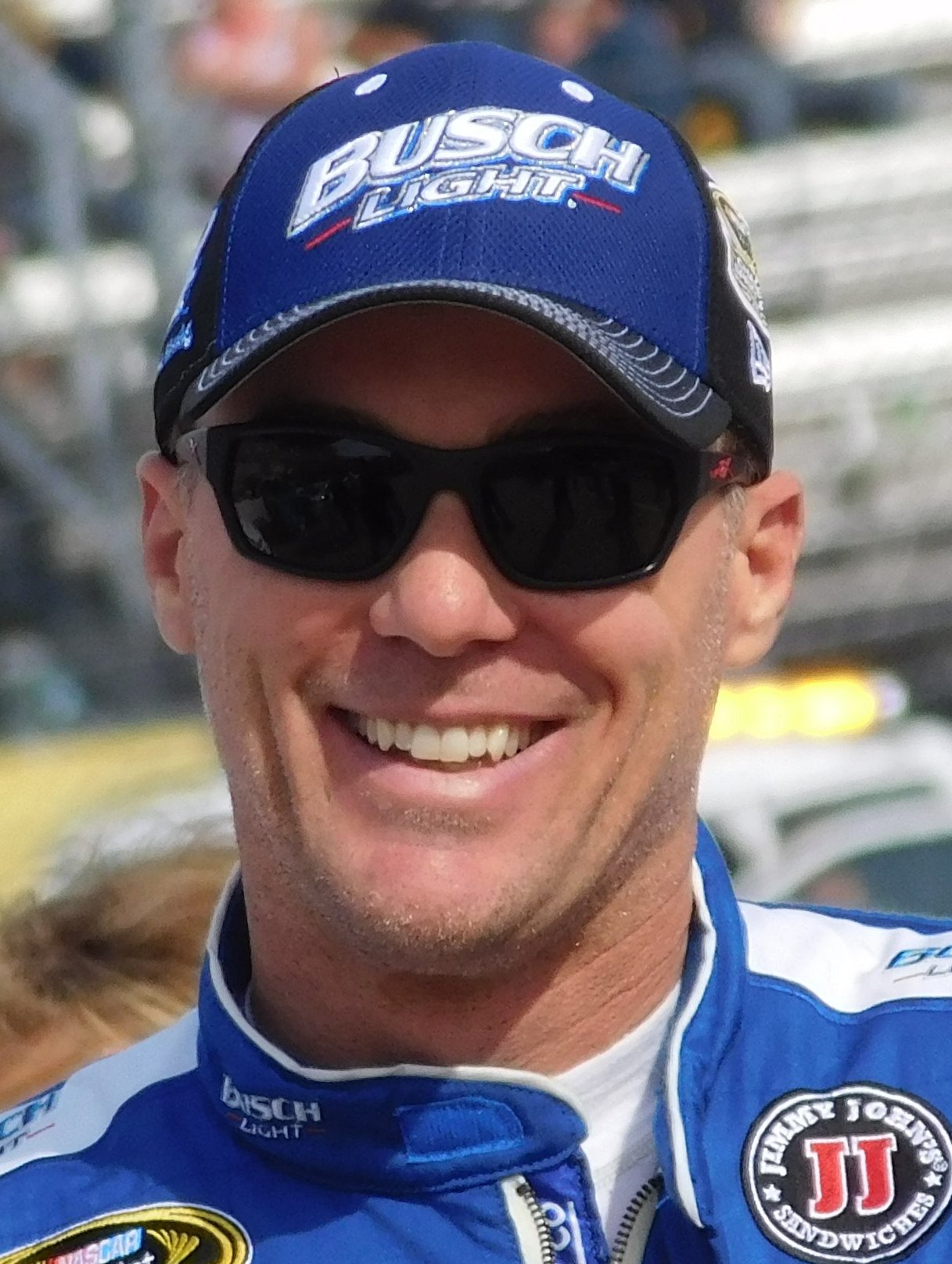
Kevin Harvick won the race.

Under clear blue New Hampshire skies, Carl Edwards led the field to the green flag at 2:17 p.m. He held the led for 30 laps before Martin Truex Jr. ran him down to take the lead on lap 31. The first round of green flag stops started on lap 75. Truex pitted from the lead on lap 77 and handed it to Kyle Busch. He pitted on lap 79 and handed the lead to Brad Keselowski. He pitted on lap 80 and the lead cycled back to Truex.

Debris brought out the first caution of the race on lap 122.

The race restarted on lap 132. A spring rubber on the backstretch brought out the second caution of the race on lap 165.

=== Second half ===
The race restarted on lap 172. Matt Kenseth passed underneath Truex going into turn 3 to take the lead on lap 179. The final round of green flag stops began with 83 laps to go. Kenseth pitted from the lead with 69 laps to go and handed it to Keselowski. He pitted with 66 laps to go and handed the lead to Danica Patrick. Michael Annett getting into the wall in turn 2 brought out the third caution of the race with 60 laps to go. He went on to finish 40th. Patrick pitted under the caution and handed the lead back to Kenseth.

The race restarted with 52 laps to go. The fourth caution of the race flew with 36 laps to go after Michael McDowell suffered a left-rear tire blowout and spun out in turn 3. Edwards was sent to the tail end of the field on the restart for a commitment cone violation.

The race restarted with 32 laps to go. The fifth caution of the race flew with 16 laps to go after Trevor Bayne rear-ended the wall in turn 4.

The race restarted with 11 laps to go. The sixth caution flew with 10 laps to go after Ricky Stenhouse Jr. got turned by Paul Menard in turn 2.

The race restarted with six laps to go. Kevin Harvick beat Kenseth going into turn 3 to take the lead with five laps to go and drove on to score the victory.

== Post-race ==
=== Driver comments ===
Harvick said in victory lane that the key "was just a smooth restart. I just didn’t want to spin the tires. I don’t know what happened to him, or if I just timed it right. It worked out good when we got to Turn 1.” He added that one of his "main goals this year was to not stretch ourselves out so bad. ... The things that we’re doing are good enough to be competitive, and we just need to not make mistakes and go from there.”

Speaking about the final restart in the media center after the race, Kenseth said he "didn’t do a very good job. I let Kevin lay back on me and NASCAR said something about the restart before that and I have no idea what I did wrong. I probably shouldn’t have had that in my mind so I made sure I got rolling early and I spun the tires a little bit and he got half a car length anticipating it and just did it perfect and beat me through one and two and cleared me. It’s my fault. I shouldn’t have worried about what they (NASCAR) said and just got to turn one first.”

== Race results ==
Pos	No.	Driver	Team	Manufacturer	Laps	Points
1	4	Kevin Harvick	Stewart–Haas Racing	Chevrolet	300	44
2	20	Matt Kenseth	Joe Gibbs Racing	Toyota	300	40
3	18	Kyle Busch	Joe Gibbs Racing	Toyota	300	39
4	2	Brad Keselowski	Team Penske	Ford	300	38
5	41	Kurt Busch	Stewart–Haas Racing	Chevrolet	300	36
6	19	Carl Edwards	Joe Gibbs Racing	Toyota	300	36
7	78	Martin Truex Jr.	Furniture Row Racing	Toyota	300	36
8	48	Jimmie Johnson	Hendrick Motorsports	Chevrolet	300	33
9	5	Kasey Kahne	Hendrick Motorsports	Chevrolet	300	32
10	42	Kyle Larson	Chip Ganassi Racing	Chevrolet	300	31
11	22	Joey Logano	Team Penske	Ford	300	30
12	21	Ryan Blaney (R)	Wood Brothers Racing	Ford	300	29
13	24	Chase Elliott (R)	Hendrick Motorsports	Chevrolet	300	29
14	88	Alex Bowman (i)	Hendrick Motorsports	Chevrolet	300	0
15	11	Denny Hamlin	Joe Gibbs Racing	Toyota	300	26
16	3	Austin Dillon	Richard Childress Racing	Chevrolet	300	25
17	43	Aric Almirola	Richard Petty Motorsports	Ford	300	24
18	10	Danica Patrick	Stewart–Haas Racing	Chevrolet	300	24
19	1	Jamie McMurray	Chip Ganassi Racing	Ford	300	22
20	31	Ryan Newman	Richard Childress Racing	Chevrolet	300	21
21	47	A. J. Allmendinger	JTG Daugherty Racing	Chevrolet	300	20
22	15	Clint Bowyer	HScott Motorsports	Chevrolet	300	19
23	14	Tony Stewart	Stewart–Haas Racing	Chevrolet	299	18
24	17	Ricky Stenhouse Jr.	Roush Fenway Racing	Ford	299	17
25	27	Paul Menard	Richard Childress Racing	Chevrolet	299	16
26	95	Michael McDowell	Circle Sport – Leavine Family Racing	Chevrolet	298	15
27	13	Casey Mears	Germain Racing	Chevrolet	298	14
28	93	Matt DiBenedetto	BK Racing	Toyota	298	13
29	38	Landon Cassill	Front Row Motorsports	Ford	298	12
30	34	Chris Buescher (R)	Front Row Motorsports	Ford	298	11
31	44	Brian Scott	Richard Petty Motorsports	Ford	298	10
32	23	David Ragan	BK Racing	Toyota	297	9
33	16	Greg Biffle	Roush Fenway Racing	Ford	297	8
34	7	Regan Smith	Tommy Baldwin Racing	Chevrolet	297	7
35	98	Cole Whitt	Premium Motorsports	Chevrolet	294	6
36	55	Reed Sorenson	Premium Motorsports	Chevrolet	293	5
37	32	Jeffrey Earnhardt (R)	Go FAS Racing	Ford	290	4
38	6	Trevor Bayne	Roush Fenway Racing	Ford	282	3
39	30	Josh Wise	The Motorsports Group	Chevrolet	268	2
40	46	Michael Annett	HScott Motorsports	Chevrolet	236	1
Official race results

=== Race summary ===
- Lead changes: 8 among different drivers
- Cautions/Laps: 6 for 31
- Red flags: 0
- Time of race: 2 hours, 54 minutes and 15 seconds
- Average speed: 109.291 miles per hour (175.887 km/h)

== Media ==
=== Television ===
NBCSN covered the race on the television side. Rick Allen, Jeff Burton – the all-time wins leader at New Hampshire Motor Speedway with four wins – and Steve Letarte had the call in the booth for the race. Dave Burns, Mike Massaro, Marty Snider and Kelli Stavast handled pit road on the television side.

NBCSN
Booth announcers	Pit reporters
Lap-by-lap: Rick Allen; Color-commentator: Jeff Burton; Color-commentator: Steve Letarte	Dave Burns; Mike Massaro; Marty Snider; Kelli Stavast

=== Radio ===
The Performance Racing Network had the radio call for the race, which was simulcast on Sirius XM NASCAR Radio.

PRN
Booth announcers	Turn announcers	Pit reporters
Lead announcer: Mark Garrow; Announcer: Brad Gillie	Turns 1 & 2: Rob Albright; Turns 3 & 4: Pat Patterson	Jeff Hammond; Brett McMillan; Steve Richards; Wendy Venturini

== Standings after the race ==
Drivers' Championship standings

	Pos	Driver	Points
1	1	Brad Keselowski	2,087
1	2	Martin Truex Jr.	2,086 (–1)
	3	Kyle Busch	2,085 (–2)
3	4	Matt Kenseth	2,078 (–9)
	5	Joey Logano	2,073 (–14)
7	6	Kevin Harvick	2,071 (–16)
3	7	Denny Hamlin	2,071 (–16)
	8	Jimmie Johnson	2,070 (–17)
3	9	Chase Elliott	2,068 (–19)
1	10	Carl Edwards	2,068 (–19)
1	11	Kurt Busch	2,067 (–20)
3	12	Kyle Larson	2,057 (–30)
2	13	Jamie McMurray	2,052 (–35)
1	14	Austin Dillon	2,052 (–35)
3	15	Tony Stewart	2,046 (–41)
	16	Chris Buescher	2,027 (–60)
Official driver's standings

Manufacturers' Championship standings

Pos	Manufacturer	Points
1	Toyota	1,156
2	Chevrolet	1,228 (–28)
3	Ford	1,072 (–84)
Official manufacturers' results

- Note: Only the first 16 positions are included for the driver standings.

Previous race: 2016 Teenage Mutant Ninja Turtles 400	Sprint Cup Series; 2016 season	Next race: 2016 Citizen Soldier 400
