= James Finch =

American businessman

- Born: James David Finch; 1950 (age 75–76); Lynn Haven, Florida, U.S.
- Occupations: Owner, Phoenix Construction; Owner, Phoenix Racing
- Years active: 1989–2013 (Phoenix Racing)

James David Finch Sr. (born 1950) is an American businessman. He is the owner of Phoenix Construction, a construction company that specializes in airport construction. He owned Phoenix Racing until late 2013 when he sold the team to Harry Scott. Finch began work in construction as a teenager, and later formed Phoenix Construction Services, whose first job was at Tyndall Air Force Base. He is the father of ARCA Menards Series driver Jake Finch.

== NASCAR ==
Finch began his racing team with driver Jeff Purvis in dirt oval track racing. He moved to NASCAR in 1989 in the Busch Series and then Winston Cup Series racing. Phoenix Racing fielded a single entry, numbered 51 and 09, on a mostly part-time basis in the Cup Series throughout its history before going full-time in its final years, and was known for its sponsorship from Miccosukee resorts. The team scored one win in the Cup Series, the 2009 Aaron's 499 won by Brad Keselowski. Finch announced in 2013 that he was leaving the sport after failing to find consistent sponsorship for the past three seasons.

He sold the team to Harry Scott Jr., of Turner Scott Motorsports, who took over at the Federated Auto Parts 400 at Richmond.

In 2014, Finch partnered with the renamed HScott Motorsports to field an entry in the Daytona 500 for Bobby Labonte, with Labonte driving to a 15th-place finish. Later in the year, Finch funded sponsorship worth at least US$25,000 for Phil Parsons Racing's No. 98 car at Daytona in July, endorsing the Florida gubernatorial campaign of Democrat Charlie Crist. The decals were removed out of respect for PPR partner Mike Curb, a Republican former lieutenant governor of California. The relationship between Finch and Crist generated additional controversy when Crist was found to be using Finch's private Cessna plane en route to a global warming lecture.

Finch returned to NASCAR sponsorship in 2015, when Phoenix Construction sponsored the No. 98 for the Daytona 500. However, the car suffered an electrical failure prior to its Budweiser Duel race and failed to qualify. Phoenix Construction would sponsor Stefan Parsons, son of Phil, in multiple Truck races across 2018–2020.

In 2020, Finch partnered with former Truck Series team owners Billy Ballew (Billy Ballew Motorsports) and Richie Wauters (Wauters Motorsports) to field a ride for Erik Jones at Homestead–Miami Speedway. The effort was spurred by a bounty from Kevin Harvick and Marcus Lemonis for full-time Cup drivers who could beat Kyle Busch in a Truck race.

== Controversies ==
Finch and Phoenix Construction have incurred criticism and several fines for environmental infractions and botched construction work. These incidents include filling a bayou in his home and filling wetlands in Panama City Beach; the latter drew a $23,000 fine from the EPA. Finch has drawn nearly $2 million in fines.

Finch won a $1.7 million contract in the 1990s to build a pipeline across St. Andrew Bay that would carry away sewage from a nearby paper mill. After construction of the pipeline began, the pipe began to be built above ground, which was a violation of requirements set forth by the Department of Environmental Protection (10 feet below channel depth or 4 feet below the mudline) to prevent a dredge or anchor from breaking the pipe. Finch received a notice of non-compliance on May 25, 2000, but Finch and Phoenix were eventually cleared of responsibility after the work was corrected in 2005.

In 2009, Finch and Phoenix were fined for allowing stormwater runoff to pollute creeks and wetlands near Northwest Florida Beaches International Airport. Finch was fined $1.7 million by the DEP for permit violations in 2010, and the incident led to suits filed between Finch and the airport authority.

Finch was arrested on March 18, 2021 in Lynn Haven, Florida in correlation to federal indictments of the city's former mayor, Margo Anderson and former city attorney, Adam Albritton on August 18, 2020 who were both charged with more than 60 crimes each and former city manager, Michael White who was indicted in 2019 on federal charges of his own. Finch's company, Phoenix Construction, was labeled in those indictments as "company B" as colluding with "company A" to fix bids in Lynn Haven. Anderson, who was indicted on charges of theft of $5 million in Hurricane Michael debris removal funds, faces 63 criminal counts, including conspiring to defraud, numerous counts of wire fraud and a charge of embezzlement of federal funds. Anderson is also charge with depriving the city of Lynn Haven and its residents of their right to honest services, and lying to federal agents. Albritton faces identical charges in addition to scheming to defraud an insurance company, rather than lying. Finch was found not guilty in 2023 after a jury trial on all charges, after the first trial ended in a hung jury.

== Video games ==
- Finch appears in NASCAR Thunder 2003 (as an unlockable Busch Series driver) driving the No. 1 Chevrolet. Despite the fact that Jimmy Spencer drove for the team part time in 2002.
