= Auto-Owners Insurance =

American insurance company

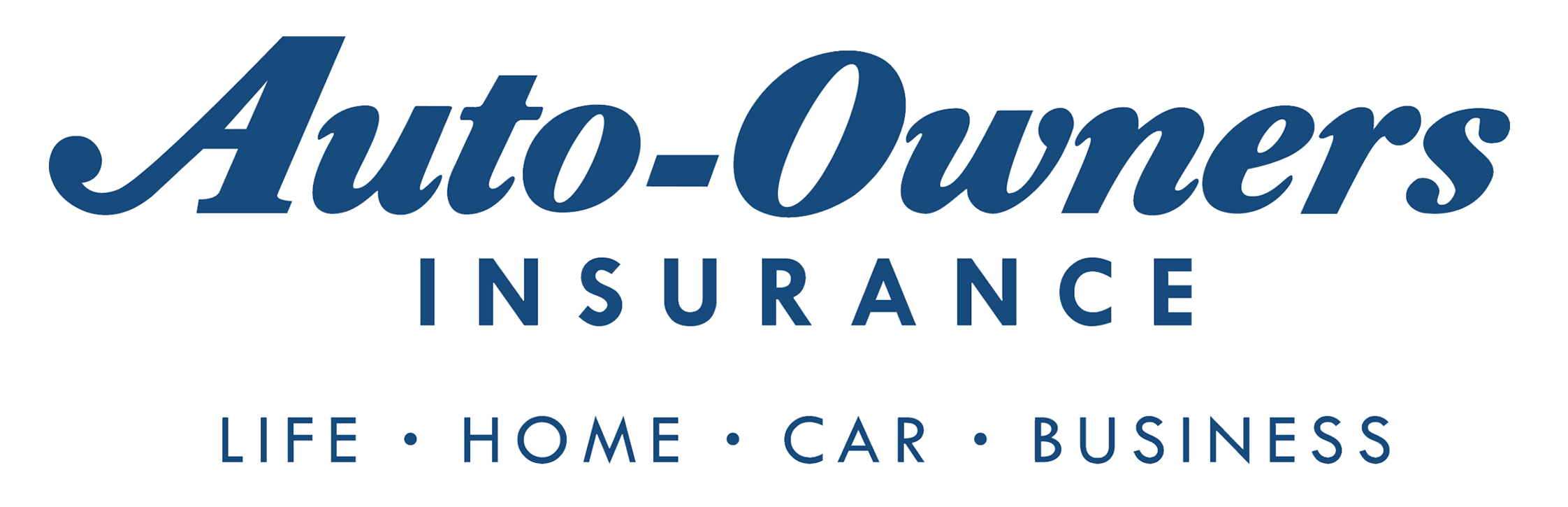
- Type: Mutual (main company)
- Industry: Finance and Insurance
- Founded: July 1, 1916
- Founder: Vern V. Moulton
- Headquarters: Lansing, Michigan
- Number of locations: 6,299 agencies
- Area served: Alabama, Arizona, Arkansas, Colorado, Florida, Georgia, Idaho, Illinois, Indiana, Iowa, Kansas, Kentucky, Michigan, Minnesota, Missouri, Nebraska, North Carolina, North Dakota, Ohio, Pennsylvania, South Carolina, South Dakota, Tennessee, Utah, Virginia and Wisconsin
- Key people: Jamie Whisnant (CEO)
- Services: Insurance
- Revenue: US $10 billion (2021 Annual Report)
- Net income: US $1.3 billion (2021 Annual Report)
- Total assets: US $32.5 billion (2021 Annual Report)
- Number of employees: 5,394 (2019)
- Divisions: Insurance; mutual funds
- Subsidiaries: See Auto-Owners Insurance Group Companies below.
- Website: www.auto-owners.com

Auto-Owners Insurance Group is a mutual insurance company that provides life, home, car and business insurance. Its policies are sold exclusively through local and independent insurance agents within their 26 operating states.

== History ==
In 1916, Vern V. Moulton and four other associates organized Auto-Owners Insurance Company in Mount Pleasant, Michigan. In 1917, the company moved its headquarters to Lansing, Michigan where the home office has remained.

Auto-Owners began writing insurance in Indiana, its first state outside of Michigan, in 1935. It now offers insurance in 26 states through local, independent insurance agents.

The company has been a member of the Fortune 500 since 2003. In 2020, Auto-Owners Insurance was listed at number 320.

As of 2025, Auto-Owners Insurance was listed at number 270.

== Auto-Owners Insurance Group Companies ==
- Auto-Owners Insurance Company
- Auto-Owners Life Insurance Company
- Owners Insurance Company
- Home-Owners Insurance Company
- Property-Owners Insurance Company
- Southern-Owners Insurance Company
- Atlantic Casualty Insurance Company
- Concord Group Insurance Companies
- Capital Insurance Group
