= 2004 IPOWER Dash Series =

The 2004 IPOWER Dash Series was the only season of the IPOWER Dash Series. It began at Daytona International Speedway on February 8 and concluded at Kentucky Speedway on September 18. Johnny Chapman won the championship by a mere 8 points over Danny Bagwell.

Following the 2003 Goody's Dash Series season, NASCAR sold the series to IPOWER (International Participants Of Winning Edge Racing) for 2004. However, the season was marred by a crash that occurred at the season opener at Daytona on lap 19, when Ray Paprota, who was unable to start the race until that point due to mechanical issues, crashed into track worker Roy Weaver, killing Roy instantly. Following the crash, the series lost so much funding that they were forced to cut the season short after seven races. The series was sold to ISCARS (International Sports Compact Auto Racing Series) the following year.

== Schedule ==
No.	Race title	Track	Date
1	IPOWER Dash 150	Daytona International Speedway, Daytona Beach, Florida	February 8
2	Steak-Eze 150	Hickory Motor Speedway, Hickory, North Carolina	April 10
3	Z-Max 75	Lowe's Motor Speedway, Concord, North Carolina	May 22
4	2004–04	Lake Erie Speedway, North East, Pennsylvania	June 5
5	2004–05	Ace Speedway, Altamahaw, North Carolina	July 2
6	US Food Service 150	Motordrome Speedway, Smithton, Pennsylvania	July 24
7	V-Taps 100	Kentucky Speedway, Sparta, Kentucky	September 18

== Results and standings ==
=== Races ===
No.	Race	Pole position	Winning driver	Manufacturer
1	IPOWER Dash 150	Danny Bagwell	Danny Bagwell	Mercury
2	Steak-Eze 150	Wade Day	Robert Huffman	Toyota
3	Z-Max 75	Johnny Chapman	Johnny Chapman	Pontiac
4	2004–04	David Hutto	Johnny Chapman	Pontiac
5	2004–05	Brandon Ward	Danny Bagwell	Mercury
6	US Food Service 150	N/A	Brandon Ward	Toyota
7	V-Taps 100	Danny Bagwell	Brandon Ward	Toyota

=== Drivers' championship ===
(key) Bold - Pole position awarded by time. Italics - Pole position set by final practice results or rainout. * – Most laps led.

Pos	Driver	DAY	HCY	CLT	LER	ACE	MOT	KEN	Points
1	Johnny Chapman	11	2	**1**	1	2	6	2	1180
2	Danny Bagwell	**1**	12	2	2	1	3	**4**	1172
3	Brandon Ward	2	11	22	5	**3**	1	1	1102
4	Scott Weaver	18	5	18	3	5	8	6	1000
5	Ned Combs	19	8	4	7	6	11	17	946
6	Mike Watts	22	9	12	4	9	5	14	936
7	Robert Bruce	14	16	24	6	12	12	13	855
8	Eric Wilson	30	6	3	14	4		3	844
9	Ray Paprota	37	13	30	13	13	7	9	799
10	Danny Keaton	25	7	8		7	15	12	770
11	Matt Barnes	21		5	10	10	4		683
12	Wade Day	9	**10***	16		15	13		654
13	Alan Powell		19	17	8			5	515
14	Jake Hobgood	5	4				2		495
15	Richard Callihan	16		20	11	14			469
16	Mark Howard	28	15	15			DNQ		433
17	Kevin Williams		17	29			10	18	431
18	Jason York	4	18	14					395
19	Ricky Gonzalez		14			11	9		389
20	John McClurg		20		12			16	345
21	David Heitzhaus	27		28				8	303
22	David Hutto			7	**9**				299
23	Justin Hobgood	6		32				15	273
24	Mike Gaines	20		10					237
25	Scott Krehling	3		31					235
26	Doc Brewer	8		27					224
27	Jeff Tillman	32						7	216
28	Wally Leatherwood	29		9					214
29	Bobby Hill	34		13					194
30	Robert Huffman		1						185
31	Alex Ferree		3						165
32	Jay Godley	31		23					164
33	Roger Moser	33		25					158
34	Tom Hubert			6					150
35	Randy Humphrey	7							146
36	Todd Massey					8			142
37	Dustin Skinner	10							134
38	Sunny Hobbs							10	134
39	Danny Snell			11					130
40	Bob Golubski Jr.							11	130
41	Josh Burgess	12							127
42	Roger Sawyer	13							124
43	Chris Fontaine	15							118
44	Maxie Bush	17							112
45	Mark Vandevender			19					106
46	Doug Bland			21					100
47	Darrell Basham	23							94
48	Michael Guerity	24							91
49	Caleb Holman	26							85
50	Reece Milton			26					85
51	Tony Billings	36							70
52	Billy Clevenger	35							70
53	Dange Hanniford	38							70
	Will Hobgood						14		0
Pos	Driver	DAY	HCY	CLT	LER	ACE	MOT	KEN	Points

== See also ==
- ISCARS Dash Touring Series
