= 1996 in NASCAR =

In 1996 in NASCAR, the National Association for Stock Car Auto Racing (NASCAR) sanctioned three national touring series, eight regional touring series, and the Winston Racing Series for local competition. NASCAR champions in 1996 were Terry Labonte, Randy LaJoie, Ron Hornaday Jr., Lance Hooper, Dave Dion, Tony Hirschman, Lyndon Amick, Mike Cope, Kelly Tanner, Chris Raudman, Joe Kosiski, and Larry Phillips.

== Off-track activities ==
During 1996, NASCAR expanded its brand into several new entertainment areas. The NASCAR Online website went live during the year, while the first four NASCAR Thunder stores, operated in conjunction with Gaylord Entertainment, were opened. In addition, the NASCAR Racing Online Series, based on Papyrus's NASCAR Racing 2 game, was formed using the Total Entertainment Network system.

== National touring series ==
=== Winston Cup Series ===
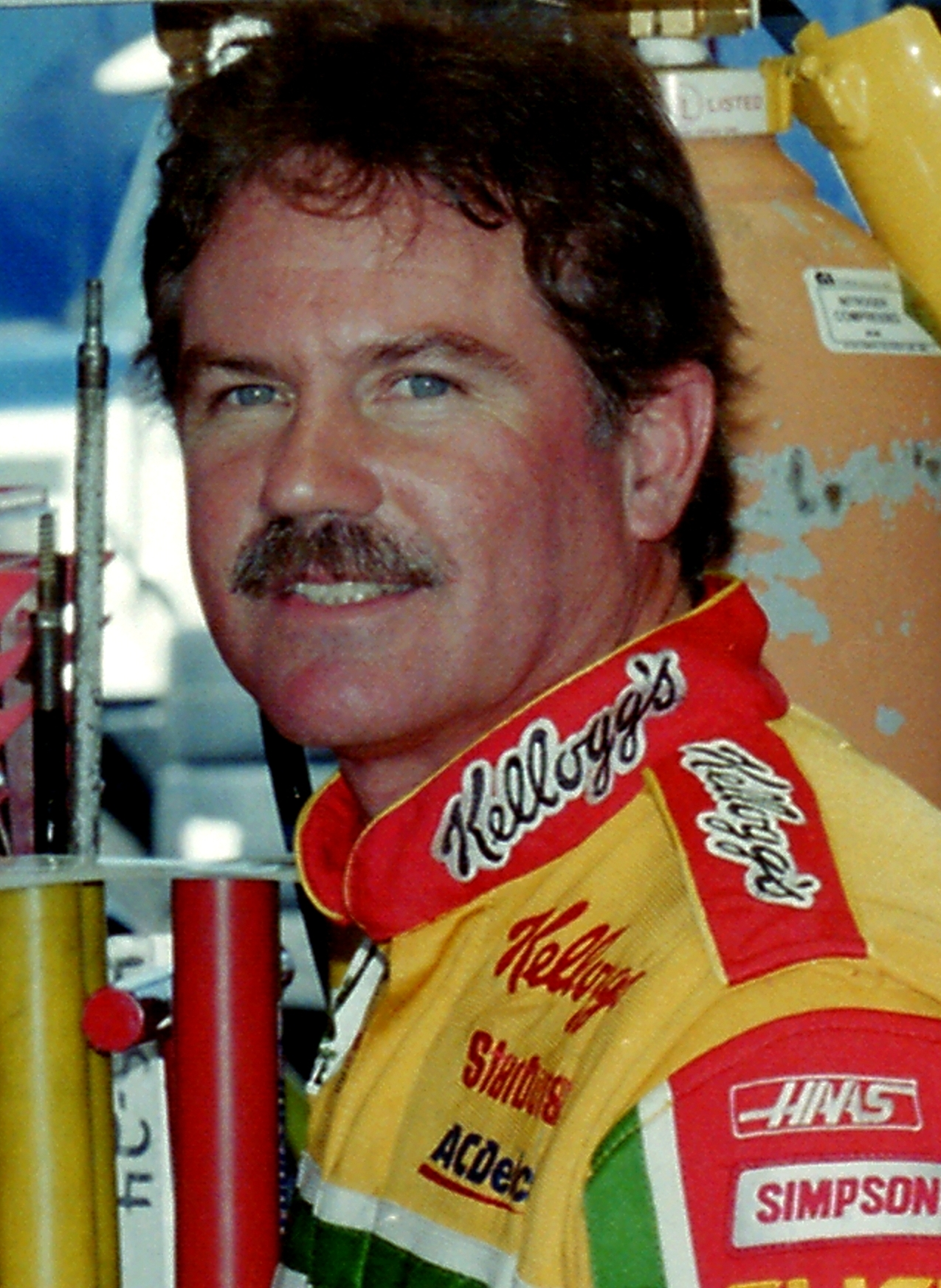
1996 Winston Cup champion Terry Labonte

The 1996 NASCAR Winston Cup Series consisted of 31 events, run at 18 race tracks in 15 states. Terry Labonte won his second series championship, beating Jeff Gordon by 37 points; the Rick Hendrick-owned No. 5 Kellogg's Corn Flakes Chevrolet team won the series' owner's championship. Labonte's team, led by crew chief Gary DeHart, also won the series' Pit Crew Championship, held in October at North Carolina Motor Speedway.

Eleven drivers won races over the course of the 31-race season; Jeff Gordon won the most events, with ten victories. Bobby Hamilton was the season's only first-time winner, winning at Phoenix International Raceway in October.

The Busch Pole Award was won by Jeff Gordon, who won five pole positions during the season. Johnny Benson Jr. won the series' Rookie of the Year title over Randy MacDonald and Stacy Compton, while Bill Elliott won his eleventh Most Popular Driver award. The series' Manufacturers' Championship was won by Chevrolet, whose teams won 17 of the series' races; Ford won 13 events while Pontiac drivers scored a single win.

In addition to the 31-race regular season, three exhibition races were run during the year. The Busch Clash, an event for the previous year's pole-winning drivers at Daytona International Speedway in February, was won by Dale Jarrett, while The Winston, the series' all-star race for race winners at Charlotte Motor Speedway in May, was won by Michael Waltrip, who had advanced into the event as a wild card from the last chance race for non-winning drivers. Following the regular season, the Winston Cup Series ran the first NASCAR exhibition race in Japan, and the first overseas exhibition race since the 1988 Goodyear NASCAR 500 in Australia, the Suzuka Thunder Special run on November 24 at Suzuka Circuit; competed in by invited drivers from the Winston Cup Series, Busch Series, Craftsman Truck Series and Winston West Series, the event was won by Rusty Wallace.

==== Top ten drivers standings ====
Pos.	Driver	Car	Manufacturer	Owner	Pts	Starts	Wins	Top 5	Top 10	Winnings
1	Terry Labonte	5	Chevrolet	Hendrick Motorsports	4657	31	2	21	24	$4,030,648
2	Jeff Gordon	24	Chevrolet	Hendrick Motorsports	4620	31	10	21	24	$3,428,485
3	Dale Jarrett	88	Ford	Robert Yates Racing	4568	31	4	17	21	$2,985,418
4	Dale Earnhardt	3	Chevrolet	Richard Childress Racing	4327	31	2	13	17	$2,285,926
5	Mark Martin	6	Ford	Roush Racing	4278	31	0	14	23	$1,887,396
6	Ricky Rudd	10	Ford	Rudd Performance Motorsports	3845	31	1	5	16	$1,503,025
7	Rusty Wallace	2	Ford	Penske Racing South	3717	31	5	8	18	$1,665,315
8	Sterling Marlin	4	Chevrolet	Morgan-McClure Motorsports	3682	31	2	5	10	$1,588,425
9	Bobby Hamilton	43	Pontiac	Petty Enterprises	3639	31	1	3	11	$1,151,235
10	Ernie Irvan	28	Ford	Robert Yates Racing	3632	31	2	12	16	$1,683,313

=== Busch Series ===
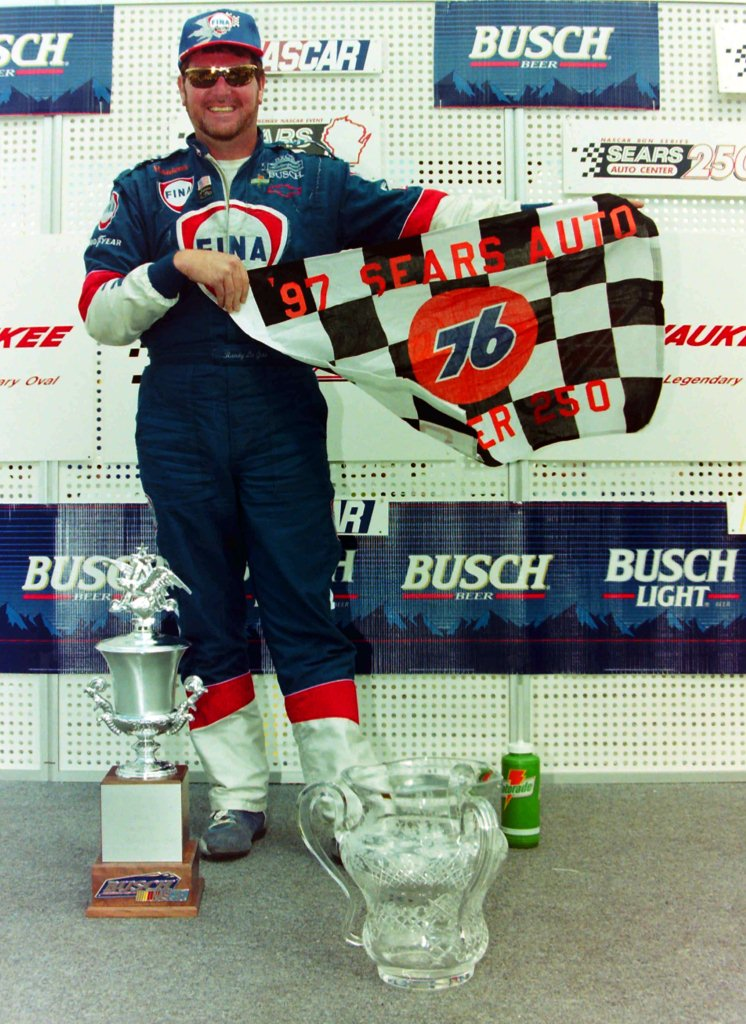
1996 Busch Series champion Randy LaJoie

The 1996 NASCAR Busch Series consisted of 26 events, run at 20 race tracks in 14 states. Randy LaJoie won his first series championship, beating David Green by 29 points.

Thirteen drivers won races over the course of the 26-race season; Mark Martin won the most events, with six victories. Randy LaJoie, Buckshot Jones, Greg Sacks, Jeff Fuller, and Kevin Lepage were first-time winners during the season.

The series' Busch Pole Award was won by David Green for the third consecutive season, winning four pole positions during the season. Glenn Allen Jr. won the series' Rookie of the Year title over Mike Dillon and Shane Hall, while David Green won the series' Most Popular Driver award. The series' Manufacturers' Championship, the Bill France Performance Cup, was won by Chevrolet.

==== Top ten drivers standings ====
Pos.	Driver	Car	Manufacturer	Owner	Pts	Starts	Wins	Top 5	Top 10	Winnings
1	Randy LaJoie	74	Chevrolet	BACE Motorsports	3714	26	5	11	20	$532,823
2	David Green	96	Chevrolet	American Equipment Racing	3685	26	2	13	18	$469,118
3	Todd Bodine	81; 82	Chevrolet	Pro Tech Motorsports	3064	26	1	3	9	$281,616
4	Jeff Green	3	Chevrolet	Dale Earnhardt, Inc.	3059	26	0	5	13	$269,285
5	Chad Little	23	Pontiac	Mark Rypien Motorsports	2984	26	0	2	7	$317,394
6	Jason Keller	57	Chevrolet	KEL Racing	2900	26	0	3	10	$281,902
7	Jeff Purvis	4	Chevrolet	Phoenix Racing	2894	26	2	4	7	$266,026
8	Kevin Lepage	71; 88	Chevrolet	Lepage Racing; Ridling Motorsports	2870	26	1	3	10	$254,925
9	Phil Parsons	10	Chevrolet	Phil Parsons Racing	2854	26	0	5	6	$215,023
10	Mike McLaughlin	34	Chevrolet	Team 34	2853	26	0	7	10	$290,701

=== Craftsman Truck Series ===
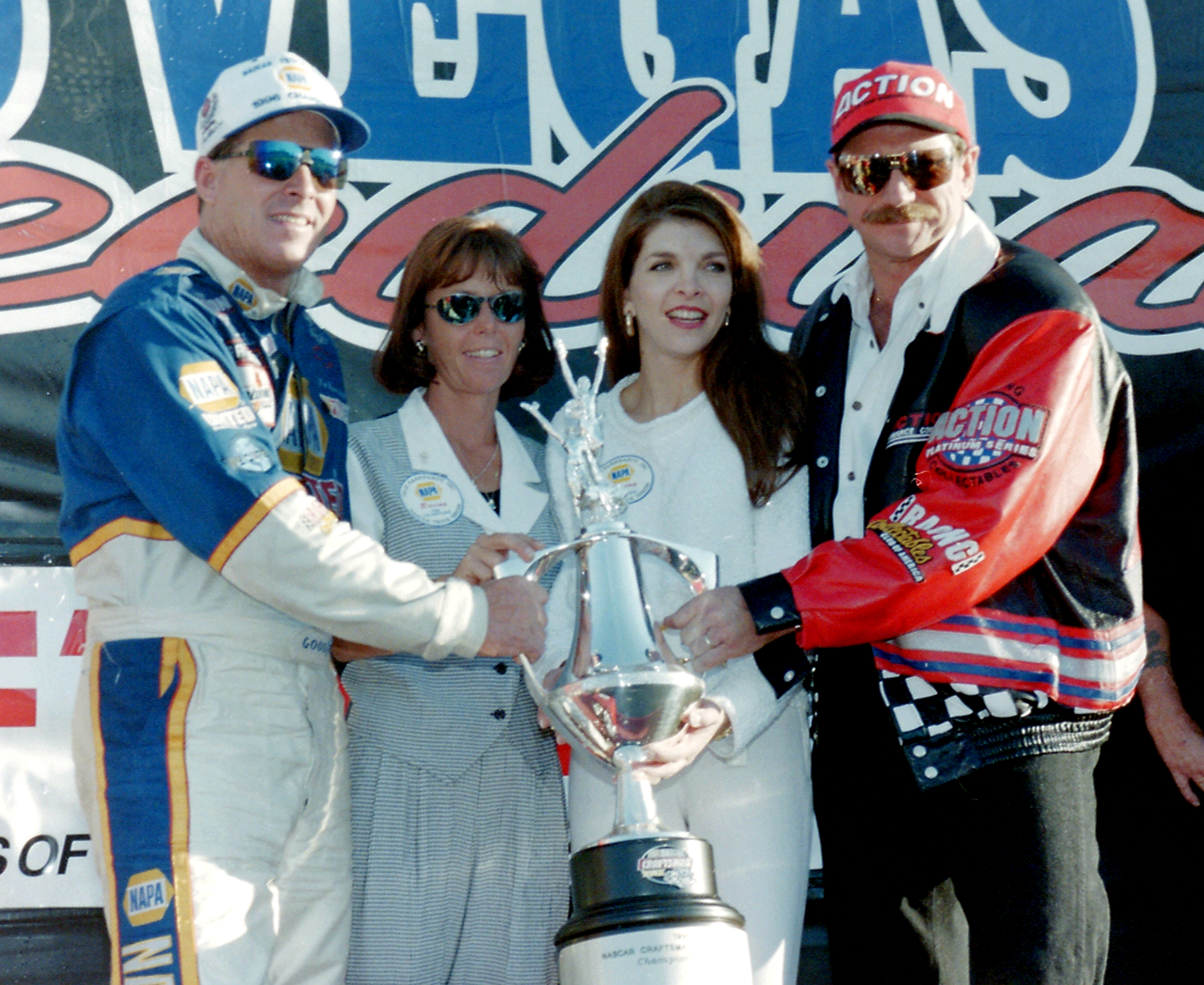
1996 Craftsman Truck Series champion Ron Hornaday Jr. (left)

The 1996 NASCAR Craftsman Truck Series, renamed from the SuperTruck Series presented by Craftsman, consisted of 24 events, run at 23 race tracks in 19 states. Ron Hornaday Jr. won his first series championship, beating Jack Sprague by 53 points.

Seven drivers won races over the course of the 26-race season; Mike Skinner won the most events, with eight victories. Dave Rezendes, Jack Sprague, Rick Carelli, and Mark Martin were first-time winners during the season.

The series' Busch Pole Award was won by Mike Skinner, winning five pole positions during the season. Bryan Reffner won the series' Rookie of the Year title over Doug George and Lance Norick, while Jimmy Hensley won the series' Most Popular Driver award. The series' Manufacturers' Championship was won by Chevrolet, followed by Ford and Dodge.

==== Top ten drivers standings ====
Pos.	Driver	Car	Manufacturer	Owner	Pts	Starts	Wins	Top 5	Top 10	Winnings
1	Ron Hornaday Jr.	16	Chevrolet	Dale Earnhardt, Inc.	3831	24	4	18	23	$614,084
2	Jack Sprague	24	Chevrolet	Hendrick Motorsports	3778	24	5	18	21	$580,112
3	Mike Skinner	3	Chevrolet	Richard Childress Racing	3771	24	8	17	20	$590,995
4	Joe Ruttman	80	Ford	Roush Racing	3275	24	0	7	16	$276,012
5	Mike Bliss	2	Ford	Ultra Motorsports	3190	24	2	9	11	$345,322
6	Dave Rezendes	7	Ford	Geoff Bodine Racing	3179	24	3	8	13	$335,840
7	Butch Miller	98; 28; 19	Ford; Ford; Dodge	Liberty Racing; Irvan-Simo Racing; Walker Evans Racing	3126	24	0	7	11	$258,333
8	Jimmy Hensley	30	Dodge	Grandaddy Racing	3029	24	0	5	14	$228,936
9	Bryan Reffner	44	Ford	Irvan-Simo Racing	2961	24	0	3	9	$200,898
10	Rick Carelli	6	Chevrolet	Chesrown Racing	2953	24	1	2	9	$216,625

== Regional touring series ==
=== Winston West Series ===
The 1996 NASCAR Winston West Series consisted of 15 events, run at 11 race tracks in 6 states; two races, at Sears Point Raceway in May and at Phoenix International Raceway in October, were combination events with the Winston Cup Series. Lance Hooper won his first series championship, beating Jeff Krogh by 30 points; Hooper was the first driver to win the championship during his rookie year in the series.

Eight drivers won races over the course of the 15-race season; Hooper won the most events, with four victories, in addition to finishing first among Winston West competitors in the Phoenix combination race; the four overall wins were a series record for a rookie driver.

The series' Busch Pole Award was tied for by Mark Krogh and Butch Gilliland, who each won three pole positions during the season. Hooper won the series' Rookie of the Year title, while Larry Gunselman won the series' Most Popular Driver award. The series' Manufacturers' Championship was won by Chevrolet, followed by Ford, Pontiac, Oldsmobile, and Buick.

==== Top ten drivers standings ====
Pos.	Driver	Car	Manufacturer	Owner	Pts	Starts	Wins	Top 5	Top 10	Winnings
1	Lance Hooper	07	Pontiac	Golden West Motorsports	2185	15	5	11	14	$63,395
2	Jeff Krogh	1	Chevrolet	Excel Motorsports	2155	14	1	12	13	$55,805
3	Larry Gunselman	37	Ford	Olson Technology Racing	2070	15	1	10	12	$58,300
4	Mark Krogh	24	Chevrolet	Excel Motorsports	1907	14	1	3	10	$23,625
5	Scott Gaylord	2	Chevrolet	Oliver Racing	1883	15	0	7	8	$43,170
6	Rich Woodland Jr.	86	Chevrolet	Woodland Racing	1841	15	0	1	11	$34,195
7	Joe Bean	3	Chevrolet	Bean & Krebs Motorsports	1789	15	1	2	8	$24,300
8	Butch Gilliland	38	Ford	Bill Stroppe Motorsports	1675	11	3	5	7	$45,325
9	Bill McAnally	2; 02	Chevrolet	Bill McAnally Racing	1623	15	0	0	4	$17,225
10	Pete Graham	59	Chevrolet		1404	12	0	0	2	$14,975

==== Manufacturer's standings ====
Pos	Manufacturer	Wins	Points
1	Chevrolet	5	87
2	Ford	4	81
3	Pontiac	4	78
4	Oldsmobile	0	14
5	Buick	0	10

=== Busch North Series ===
The 1996 NASCAR Busch North Series consisted of 21 events, run at 14 race tracks in 8 states; two races, at Daytona International Speedway in February and at Nazareth Speedway in May, were combination events with the Busch Series. Dave Dion won his first series championship, beating Andy Santerre by 116 points.

Eight drivers won races over the course of the 21-race season; Andy Santerre won the most events, with four victories. The series' Busch Pole Award was won by Santerre, who won eight pole positions during the season. Brad Leighton won the series' Rookie of the Year title, while Brandon Butler won the series' Most Popular Driver award.

==== Top ten drivers standings ====
Pos.	Driver	Car	Manufacturer	Owner	Pts	Starts	Wins	Top 5	Top 10	Winnings
1	Dave Dion	29	Ford	Dion Racing Enterprises	2803	19	2	10	12	$74,060
2	Andy Santerre	44	Chevrolet	Andy Santerre Motorsports	2687	20	4	8	13	$100,700
3	Dale Shaw	60	Pontiac	Shaw Racing	2654	20	2	9	12	$76,900
4	Kelly Moore	24	Pontiac	Moore Racing	2637	20	0	6	13	$67,675
5	Brad Leighton	55	Chevrolet	Grizco Racing	2596	19	2	8	10	$73,150
6	Mike Stefanik	51	Chevrolet	Greci Racing	2523	20	0	8	9	$54,920
7	Robbie Crouch	6	Pontiac	Ling Racing	2415	19	0	7	10	$42,495
8	Tom Bolles	76	Chevrolet	Bolles Motorsports	2380	21	0	2	7	$45,590
9	Brandon Butler	7	Pontiac	Shaw Racing	2321	19	0	3	10	$31,675
10	Stub Fadden	16	Chevrolet	Fadden Racing	2243	19	0	1	7	$28,055

=== Featherlite Modified Tour ===
The 1996 NASCAR Featherlite Modified Tour consisted of 20 events, run at 11 race tracks in 7 states. Tony Hirschman won the series championship for the second consecutive year, beating Steve Park by 12 points.

Eight drivers won races over the course of the 20-race season; Steve Park won the most events, with five victories; Park also won the series' Busch Pole Award, winning won four pole positions during the season, and the series' Most Popular Driver award.

==== Top ten drivers standings ====
Pos.	Driver	Car	Manufacturer	Pts	Starts	Wins	Top 5	Top 10
1	Tony Hirschman	3	Chevrolet	2919	20	3	12	14
2	Steve Park	8	Chevrolet	2907	20	5	13	13
3	Rick Fuller	17	Chevrolet	2698	20	2	9	12
4	Jan Leaty	25	Chevrolet	2689	20	3	7	11
5	Mike Stefanik	6	Chevrolet	2669	19	3	10	11
6	Tim Connolly	4	Dodge	2664	20	0	8	11
7	Jerry Marquis	21	Chevrolet	2649	20	2	9	13
8	Ed Flemke Jr.	11	Chevrolet	2568	20	1	4	11
9	Tom Baldwin	7	Pontiac	2501	20	1	3	9
10	Tony Ferrante Jr.	31	Chevrolet	2387	20	0	0	6

=== Goody's Dash Series ===
The 1996 NASCAR Goody's Dash Series consisted of 21 events, run at 18 race tracks in 5 states. Lyndon Amick won his first series championship, beating Robert Huffman by 34 points.

Eight drivers won races over the course of the 21-race season; Amick and Will Hobgood tied for winning the most events, with four victories.[42] Hobgood also won the series' Busch Pole Award, winning five pole positions during the season. Jimmy Foster won the series' Rookie of the Year title over Andy Houston and Brian Sockwell, while Andy Houston won the series' Most Popular Driver award.

==== Top ten drivers standings ====
Pos.	Driver	Car	Manufacturers	Pts	Starts	Wins	Top 5	Top 10
1	Lyndon Amick	33	Pontiac	3170	21	4	12	17
2	Robert Huffman	37	Pontiac	3136	21	3	13	16
3	Will Hobgood	65	Pontiac	3128	21	4	12	14
4	Danny Bagwell	10	Ford	3044	21	1	13	16
5	Mike Swaim Jr.	28	Pontiac	2932	21	2	8	14
6	B.J. Mackey	11	Chevrolet	2822	21	1	7	11
7	Jimmy Foster	7	Pontiac	2753	21	1	6	13
8	Ned Combs	9	Pontiac	2620	21	0	4	10
9	Mickey York	24	Pontiac	2611	21	10	3	10
10	Scott Weaver	2	Pontiac	2423	21	0	1	5

=== Slim Jim All Pro Series ===
The 1996 NASCAR Slim Jim All Pro Series consisted of 23 events, run at 19 race tracks in 11 states. Mike Cope won his second series championship, beating Toby Porter by 184 points.

Eleven drivers won races over the course of the 21-race season; Toby Porter and Ron Young tied for winning the most events, with four victories each. The series' Busch Pole Award was won by Wayne Anderson, who won five pole positions during the season; Tammy Jo Kirk won two poles, becoming the series' first female pole winner. Steven Christian won the series' Rookie of the Year title over Wayne Anderson and Nipper Alsup, while Tammy Jo Kirk won the series' Most Popular Driver award.

==== Top ten drivers standings ====
Pos.	Driver	Car	Manufacturer	Pts	Starts	Wins	Top 5	Top 10
1	Mike Cope	57	Chevrolet	3544	23	2	18	19
2	Toby Porter	44; 80	Chevrolet	3360	23	4	13	17
3	Steven Christian	0	Chevrolet	3359	23	3	12	18
4	Rick Crawford	14	Ford	3348	23	3	11	15
5	Ron Young	4	Chevrolet	3282	23	4	11	15
6	Wayne Anderson	25	Chevrolet	3065	23	1	7	12
7	Tammy Jo Kirk	52	Chevrolet	2985	23	0	5	11
8	Derrick Gilchrist	83; 44	Chevrolet	2732	23	0	3	16
9	Nipper Alsup	74	Chevrolet	2716	22	0	1	12
10	Conrad Burr	33	Chevrolet	2623	22	0	1	7

=== Reb-Co Northwest Tour ===
The 1996 NASCAR Reb-Co Northwest Tour consisted of 13 events, run at 7 race tracks in Washington and Oregon. Kelly Tanner won his first series championship, beating Garrett Evans by 156 points.

Eight drivers won races over the course of the 13-race season; Garrett Evans won the most events, scoring four victories. The series' Busch Pole Award was won by Kelly Tanner, who won four pole positions during the season; Marc Groskreutz won the series' Rookie of the Year award.

==== Top ten drivers standings ====
Pos.	Driver	Car	Manufacturer	Pts	Starts	Wins	Top 5	Top 10	Winnings
1	Kelly Tanner	65	Chevrolet	2123	13	2	11	13	$26,760
2	Garrett Evans	64	Ford	1967	13	4	8	10	$23,550
3	Ron Eaton	7	Pontiac	1852	13	1	7	8	$24,130
4	Chris Cunningham	04	Ford	1795	13	1	4	10	$19,550
5	Marc Groskreuz	72	Chevrolet	1774	13	1	1	8	$14,555
6	Rick Schultz	84	Chevrolet	1737	13	0	4	8	
7	Bill Lawrence	21	Chevrolet	1697	13	0	1	8	
8	Martin Rosler	81	Chevrolet	1648	13	0	3	5	
9	Gary Lewis	73	Chevrolet	1647	13	2	6	6	
10	Ken Bailey	27	Chevrolet	1644	13	0	2	4	

=== Featherlite Southwest Tour ===
The 1996 NASCAR Featherlite Southwest Tour consisted of 18 events, run at 13 race tracks in 5 states. Chris Raudman won his first series championship, beating Bryan Germone by 160 points.

Twelve drivers won races over the course of the 18-race season; Craig Raudman won the most events, with three victories each. The series' Busch Pole Award was tied for by Chris Raudman, Craig Raudman, and M. K. Kanke, who won three pole positions each; Chris Raudman won the series' Rookie of the Year title as well as the championship. Chris Raudman also won the series' "Winter Heat" exhibition race at Tucson Raceway Park in December.

==== Top ten drivers standings ====
Pos.	Driver	Car	Manufacturer	Pts	Starts	Wins	Top 5	Top 10
1	Chris Raudman	93	Chevrolet	2739	18	2	13	13
2	Bryan Germone	5	Chevrolet	2579	18	2	8	14
3	Craig Raudman	2	Chevrolet	2575	18	3	8	11
4	Chris Trickle	70	Chevrolet	2441	18	1	6	9
5	Bob Lyon	44	Chevrolet	2387	18	1	4	12
6	Michael Alsup	61	Chevrolet	2384	18	0	1	8
7	Mark Reed	73	Chevrolet	2352	18	2	6	9
8	Doug McCoun	34	Pontiac	2219	18	1	4	10
9	Keith Spangler	37	Chevrolet	2141	18	0	2	8
10	Tony Toste	33	Chevrolet	2088	17	0	0	6

=== Busch All-Star Tour ===
The only NASCAR regional series to compete on dirt tracks, the 1996 NASCAR Busch All-Star Tour consisted of 16 events, run at 11 race tracks in 5 states. Joe Kosiski won his fourth series championship, beating Ray Guss Jr. by 19 points.

Eight drivers won races over the course of the 18-race season; Joe Kosiski won the most events, with four victories. Donnie McClellan won the series' Rookie of the Year title, while Denny Osborn was named the series' Most Popular Driver.

==== Top ten drivers standings ====
Pos.	Driver	Car	Manufacturer	Pts	Starts	Wins	Top 5	Top 10
1	Joe Kosiski	53	Chevrolet	2586	16	4	14	15
2	Ray Guss Jr.	12	Chevrolet	2567	16	1	14	15
3	Steve Kosiski	52	Chevrolet	2304	16	2	7	11
4	Gary Webb	70	Chevrolet	2224	16	1	8	13
5	Donnie McClellan	22	Chevrolet	2105	16	0	2	8
6	Jay Johnson	5	Chevrolet	2092	16	0	3	8
7	Denny Osborn	72	Chevrolet	1995	16	0	0	4
8	Brian Birkhofer	15	Chevrolet	1716	11	4	6	8
9	Bob Helm	1X	Chevrolet	1712	13	2	4	6
10	Curt Martin	45	Chevrolet	1675	14	0	1	8

== Winston Racing Series ==
The 1996 NASCAR Winston Racing Series was a local racing series operating under NASCAR sanction, comprising 100 member tracks grouped into 10 regions. Each track ran weekly races in a variety of classes, with one class being the track's featured class; each featured class champion at each track was then ranked using a Competition Performance Index (CPI), based on the driver's winning percentage, a weighed car count for the region's tracks, and percentage of races competed in, with the driver having the highest CPI being declared the regional champion. The regional champions' CPIs were then ranked, with the highest-ranking driver being awarded the national championship.

Larry Phillips, competing in the Grand American Late Model class at I-44 Speedway in the Heartland Region, won the series' national championship in 1996, his fifth Winston Racing Series national championship. Second in the national rankings was John Blewett III, competing at Flemington Speedway in the Northeast Region, third was Wes Troup of Old Dominion Speedway in the Atlantic Seaboard Region, fourth was Steven Howard competing at Greenville-Pickens Speedway in the Blue Ridge Region, fifth was Steve Boley from West Liberty Raceway in the Midwest Region, sixth was Bobby Hogge IV competing at Antioch Speedway and Altamont Raceway Park in the Pacific Coast Region, seventh was Eddie McKean of Magic Valley Speedway in the Great West Region, eighth was Mike VanSparrentak from Kalamazoo Speedway in the Mid-America Region, ninth was Carl Trimmer of Tucson Raceway Park in the Sunbelt Region, and tenth was Dale Planck, who competed at Fulton Speedway and Utica-Rome Speedway in the New England Region.

Preceded by 1995 in NASCAR	NASCAR seasons 1996	Succeeded by 1997 in NASCAR
