= Freddy Smith (racing driver) =

- Freddy Smith in his racing career
- Nationality: American
- Born: December 22, 1946 Kings Mountain, North Carolina, U.S.
- Died: October 14, 2023 (aged 76) Charlotte, North Carolina, U.S.

Championship titles
- 5× Dirt Track World Champion

Awards
- National Dirt Late Model Hall of Fame (2001); Kings Mountain Sports Hall of Fame (1993)

William "Freddy" Smith (December 22, 1946 – October 14, 2023) was an American dirt late model racing driver from Kings Mountain, North Carolina. Known as "The Southern Gentleman," Smith amassed 785 career victories and five Dirt Track World Championship titles, making him one of the most successful drivers in the sport's history. He was inducted into the inaugural class of the National Dirt Late Model Hall of Fame in 2001.

== Early life and career ==
Smith was born in Kings Mountain, North Carolina. He began racing in the mid-1960s and quickly gained recognition for his driving skill and sportsmanship. His consistent performance earned him the nickname "The Southern Gentleman".

== Racing achievements ==
- Career wins: 785
- Dirt Track World Championships: 5 (record)
- Hav-A-Tampa National Championship: 1996
- Top-five finishes in the Dirt Late Model Dream: 1994, 1999, 2000

Smith competed nationwide and was particularly noted for his performances at Eldora Speedway, one of the premier dirt racing tracks in the United States.

== Personal life ==
Smith was married to Naomi Kirby Smith for 58 years. He is survived by his son Jeff Smith, daughter-in-law Heather, sister Josephine Moss, and several grandchildren and great-grandchildren.

== Death ==
Smith died on October 14, 2023, after a brief battle with leukemia. His legacy in dirt track racing remains significant for his numerous victories, championships, and sportsmanship.
