= NASCAR Regional =

NASCAR group

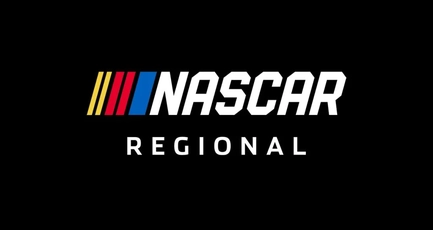
NASCAR Regional logo since 2024

NASCAR Regional (formerly known as NASCAR Home Tracks and NASCAR Roots) is a group of regional stock car racing divisions and race tracks running on a weekly basis sanctioned by NASCAR.

== History ==
NASCAR Home Tracks logo from 2018 to 2019.

Known as NASCAR Home Tracks until 2019, the organization rebranded as NASCAR Roots after the 2019 season while covering the same series that Home Tracks did.

In 2024, NASCAR Roots rebranded as NASCAR Regional.

== List of divisions ==
=== ARCA Menards Series ===
- East
- West

=== Whelen Modified Tour ===
- Whelen Modified Tour

=== NASCAR Local Racing Series ===
- NASCAR Local Racing Series

=== International series ===
- NASCAR Canada Series
- NASCAR Mexico Series
- NASCAR Euro Series
- NASCAR Brasil Series

=== Former series ===
- NASCAR Baby Grand National/Dash Series (1975–2003)
- NASCAR AutoZone Elite Division, Midwest Series (1998–2006)
- NASCAR AutoZone Elite Division, Northwest Series (1985–2006)
- NASCAR AutoZone Elite Division, Southeast Series (1991–2006)
- NASCAR AutoZone Elite Division, Southwest Series (1985–2006)
- NASCAR Busch All-Star Tour (1985–2002)
- Whelen Southern Modified Tour (2005–2016)
