= List of NASCAR champions =

Disambiguation page

List of NASCAR champions could refer to:

- List of NASCAR Cup Series champions
- List of NASCAR Xfinity Series champions
- List of NASCAR Truck Series champions
- List of ARCA Menards Series champions
- List of ARCA Menards Series East champions
- List of ARCA Menards Series West champions
- List of NASCAR Canada Series champions
- List of NASCAR Whelen Euro Series champions
- List of NASCAR Whelen Modified Tour champions
- List of NASCAR Whelen Southern Modified Tour champions
- List of NASCAR Advance Auto Parts Weekly Series national champions
- List of NASCAR Mexico Series champions
- List of NASCAR Mexico T4 Series champions
- List of NASCAR Brasil Sprint Race champions
- List of Busch All-Star Tour champions
- List of NASCAR Convertible Division champions
- List of Australia Touring Series champions
- List of NASCAR AutoZone Elite Division, Southwest Series champions
- List of NASCAR AutoZone Elite Division, Northwest Series champions
