= Ray Paprota =

American racing driver

- Nationality: American
- Born: Raymond P. Paprota; May 13, 1962 New Brunswick, New Jersey, U.S.
- Died: June 29, 2022 (aged 60)

NASCAR Goody's Dash Series career
- Debut season: 2002
- Years active: 2002–2003
- Starts: 3
- Championships: 0
- Wins: 0
- Poles: 0
- Best finish: 41st in 2003
- Statistics up to date as of December 20, 2024.

Raymond P. Paprota (May 13, 1962 – June 29, 2022) was an American professional stock car racing driver who competed in the NASCAR Goody's Dash Series from 2002 to 2003. He also competed in the IPOWER Dash Series and the ISCARS Dash Touring Series from 2004 to 2005. A paraplegic, he was the first and only paraplegic to compete in NASCAR.

In 1984, Paprota, who was a pilot for the U.S. Air Force, was involved in a car accident in New Jersey that caused injuries to his neck that left him as a paraplegic. After rehabilitation, he went on to participate in wheelchair basketball, and moved to Birmingham, Alabama in 1993. Paprota attempted to participate for the 1996 Atlanta Paralympic Games, but suffered a shoulder injury before the try-out.

On February 8, 2004, Paprota was involved in an incident during a caution period during the IPOWER Dash Series race at Daytona International Speedway, where Roy Weaver, a safety worker at Daytona International Speedway, was killed when he was struck by a car driven by Paprota. Weaver was attempting to pick up debris from a racing accident at the time.

== Motorsports results ==
=== NASCAR ===
(key) (Bold – Pole position awarded by qualifying time. Italics – Pole position earned by points standings or practice time. * – Most laps led.)

==== Goody's Dash Series ====
NASCAR Goody's Dash Series results
Year	Team	No.	Make	1	2	3	4	5	6	7	8	9	10	11	12	13	14	NGDS	Pts	Ref
2002	Four Tech Racing	01	Pontiac	DAY	HAR	ROU	LON	CLT	KEN	MEM	GRE	SNM	SBO	MYB	BRI	MOT; DNQ	ATL; 21	51st	184	
2003	Paprota Racing	0	Pontiac	DAY	OGL; 21	CLT	SBO	GRE	KEN	BRI	ATL; 19							41st	206	
