= National Dirt Late Model Hall of Fame =

Driver Hall of Fame in Walton, Kentucky

Coordinates: 38.8737°N 84.6981°W

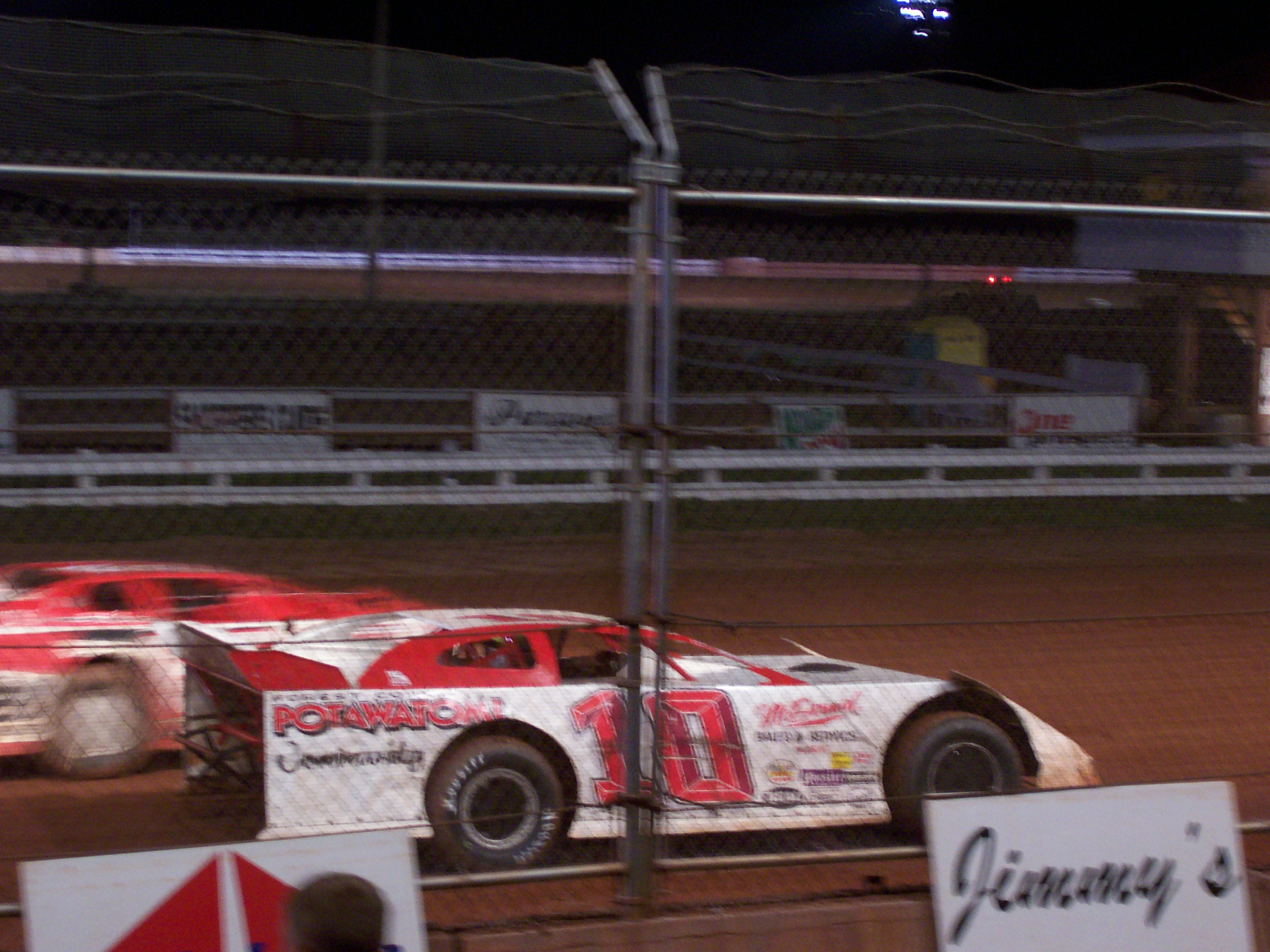
2006 National Dirt Late Model Hall of Fame inductee Pete Parker's #10 WISSOTA Dirt Late Model car

The National Dirt Late Model Hall of Fame is a non-profit hall of fame for American drivers of dirt late model racecars. It is located on the grounds of Florence Speedway in Walton, Kentucky.

== History ==
During 2001 while conversing with a group of people involved in the sport, longtime motorsports journalist Bill Holder decided to create the National Dirt Late Model Hall of Fame. The first induction ceremony took place later in August at Florence Speedway during their annual NORTH-SOUTH 100.

== Induction process ==
Within the NDLMHOF, there are three types of inductees, each of which contributes to the sport in a different manner. The types are Drivers, Contributors, and the Sportsman Award.

All of the inductees are elected by the vote of a Hall of Fame Voting Board on candidates that have been submitted. The voting board consists of voters from all aspects of the Dirt Late Model scene.

The general requirements for the drivers are that they must have at least 30 years in the sport or are retired. Although it was initially required for all drivers to be retired, that no longer is a constraint because experience has shown that many of them never retire. Normally, six (unless a tie) are taken from this category.

The Contributor category includes individuals from all aspects of the sport including promoters, series directors, car builders, engine builders, crew chiefs, car owners, media types, etc. This category provides two inductees.

Finally, there is the Sportsman Award category which inducts one active driver. This inductee, who is also voted on by the Voting Board is an individual who supports the Dirt Late Model sport by working closely with promoters, track owners, sanctioning body heads, helps young and inexperienced drivers, and maybe most importantly, interfaces with the fans. This category is done completely by the Voting Board who both nominates the candidates and then selects the winner.

== List of inductees ==
=== 2001–2005 ===
2001

Drivers:

- Jack Boggs
- Rodney Combs
- Jim Dunn
- Mike Duvall
- Larry Moore
- Larry Phillips
- Jeff Purvis
- Buck Simmons
- Freddy Smith
- Charlie Swartz

Contributors to the sport:7

- Earl Baltes
- Ed Howe
- Jimmy Mosteller
- C.J. Rayburn
- Robert Smawley

2002

- B.J. Parker
- Bob Memmer
- Ray Callahan
- Barry Wright
- Bob Wearing, Sr.
- Jerry Inmon
- Pat Patrick
- B. J. Parker
- Tom Helfrich
- Red Farmer
- Donnie Moran
- Scott Bloomquist
- Billy Moyer
- Donnie Moran

2003

- Leon Archer
- Delmas Conley
- Jim Curry
- Ray Godsey
- Bud Lunsford
- John Mason
- Russ Petro
- Bob Pierce
- Rick Gross
- J.W. Hunt
- Johnny Johnson
- Carl Short

2004

- Bob Miller
- Bob Newton
- Butch Hartman
- Rodney Franklin
- Chub Frank
- Ed Dixon
- Ed Sanger
- Floyd Gilbert
- Larry Shaw
- Ronnie Johnson

2005

- Charlie Hughes
- Doug Kenimer
- Billy Teegarden
- Tom Nesbitt
- Lynn Geisler
- Rick Aukland
- Frank Plessinger
- Brad Malcuit
- Bill Holder

=== 2006–2010 ===
2006

- Ken Essary
- Chris Francis
- Ralph Latham
- Vern Lefevers
- Doc Lehman
- Pete Parker
- Jack Pennington
- Dick Potts

2007

- Verlin Eakers
- Ralph Earnhardt
- Gene Petro
- Herb Scott
- David Speer
- HE Vineyard
- Mike Swims
- Mickey Swims

2008

- Danny Dean
- Herman Goddard
- Joe Kosiski
- Chuck McWilliams
- Gary Stuhler
- Gary Webb
- Butterball Wooldridge
- Morgan Chandler
- Porter Lanigan

2009

- Gene Chupp
- Stick Elliott
- Tootle Estes
- Bruce Gould
- Don Hester
- Kris Patterson
- Carlton Lamm
- Mark Richards
- Ken Schrader (Sportsman Award)

2010

- Ernie Derr
- Ronnie Weedon
- Steve Kosiski
- Roger Long
- Mike Head
- Billy Scott
- Bobby Paul
- Thomas Family from Alabama

=== 2011–2015 ===
2011

- Don Bohlander
- William "Fats" Coffey
- Kevin Gundaker
- Bill Morgan
- Rance Phillips
- Ramo Stott
- Roscoe Smith (Contributing Award)
- Family of Joe Lee (Contributing Award)
- Family of Jean Johnson (Contributing Award)
- Dale McDowell (Sportsman Award)
- Bub McCool (Hall of Fame Spirit Award)
- Jeep Van Warmer (Hall of Fame Spirit Award)

2012

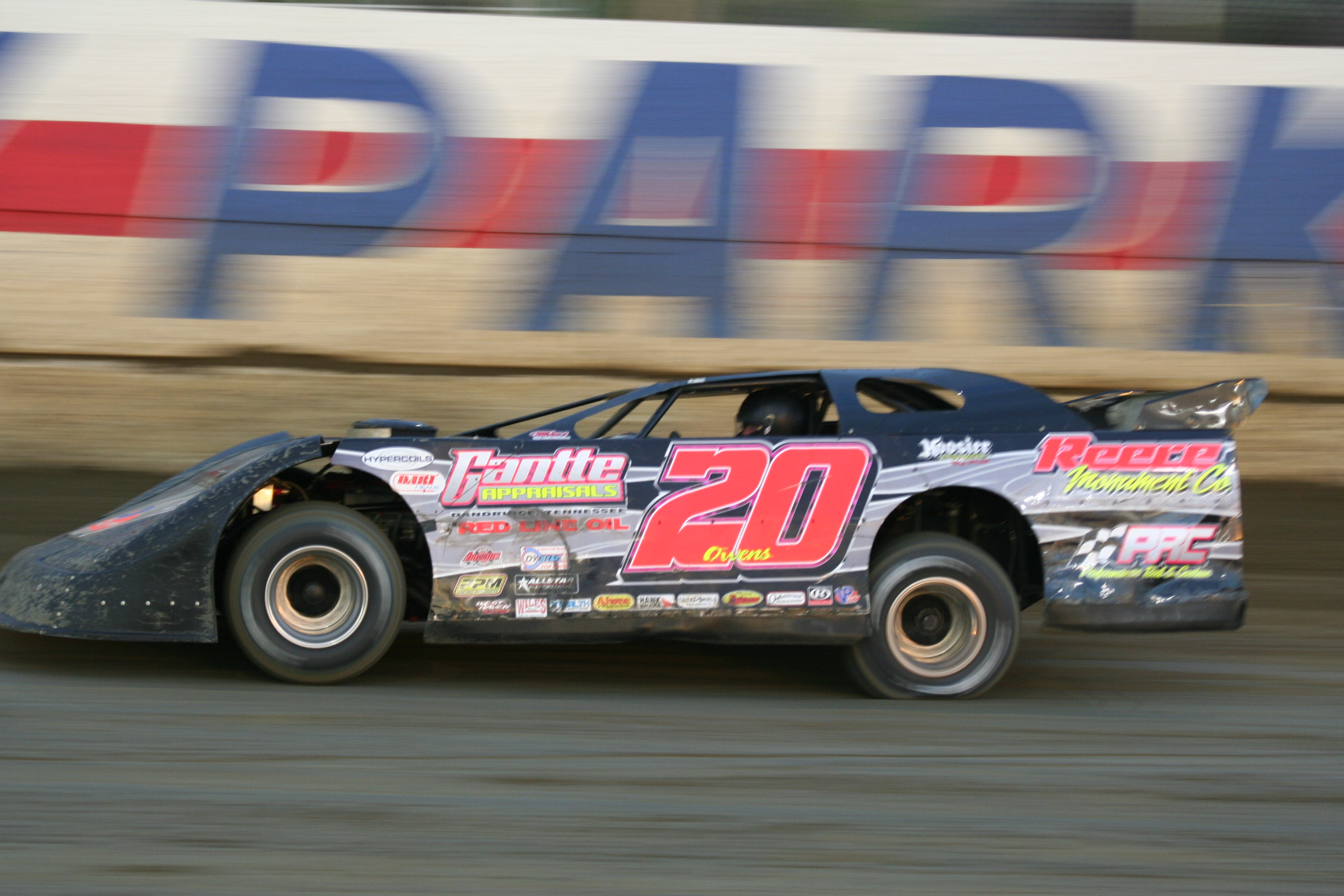
Jimmy Owens in 2008

- Mike Balzano
- Kenny Brightbill
- Ray Guss Jr.
- Don Hobbs
- Doug Ingalls
- Keith and Tader Masters from Mastersbilt Chassis (Contributors)
- Raye Vest (Contributor)
- Jimmy Owens (Sportsman)

2013

- Eddie Carrier, Sr.
- Darrell Dake
- Bill Frye
- John Gill
- Willy Kraft
- Bret Emrick (Contributor-Race Director and Announcer)
- Joe Garrison (Contributor-GRT Chassis builder)
- Jack Starrette (Contributor-Sponsor)
- Don O'Neal (Sportsman Award)
- Wally Heminger (Lifetime Achievement Award)

2014

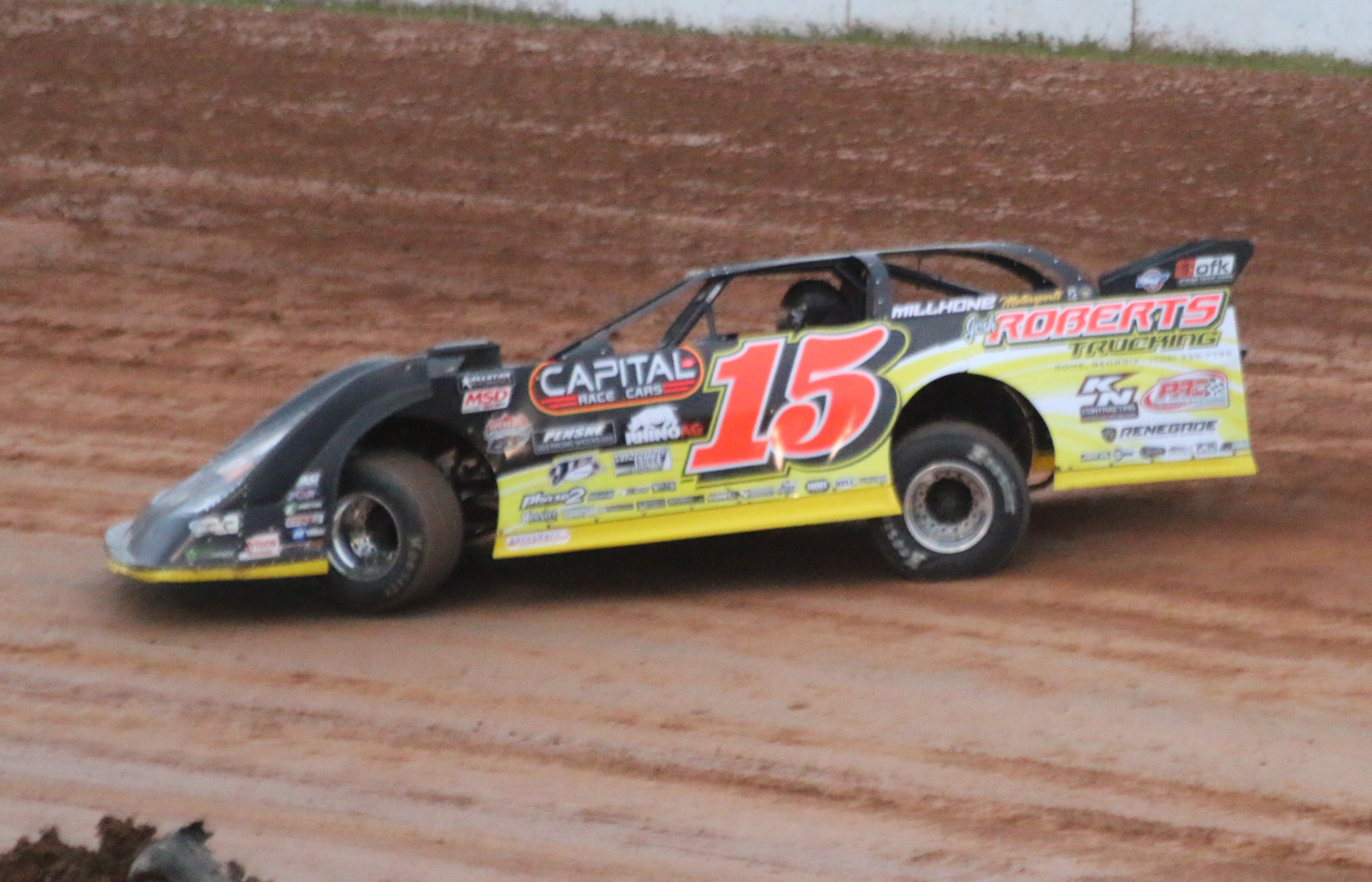
Steve Francis' 2017 late model

- Denny Bonebrake
- Steve Francis
- Ed Gibbons
- Bob Kosiski
- Ken Walton
- Allan E. Brown (Contributor-Journalist)
- Walter Burson (Contributor-Technical Inspector)
- Larry and Penny Eckrich (Contributor-Car Owners)
- Red Farmer (Sportsman Award)
- Luke Hoffner (Lifetime Achievement)
- Fred King (Lifetime Achievement)

2015

- Skip Arp
- LaVern "Red" Droste
- Curt Hansen
- Davey Johnson
- Leon Sells
- Jim Butler(Contributor-Photographer)
- Al Frieden (Contributor-Track Promoter)
- Wayne Kindness (Contributor-Writer/Editor)
- Butch Shay (Lifetime Achievement)
- Craig Cowan (Lifetime Achievement)
- Eddie Carrier Jr. (Sportsman Award)

=== 2016–present ===
2016

- Tom Hearst
- Tiny Lund
- Tony Izzo Sr.
- Leon Plank
- Fulmer Lance
- Steve Norris (Crew Chief)(Contributor)
- Ed Petroff (Sponsor)(Contributor)
- Lee Roy Rumley (Engine Builder)(Contributor)
- Eldon Butcher (Lifetime Achievement)
- Ron Jerger Sr. (Lifetime Achievement)
- Forrest Lucas (Earl Baltes Award)

2017

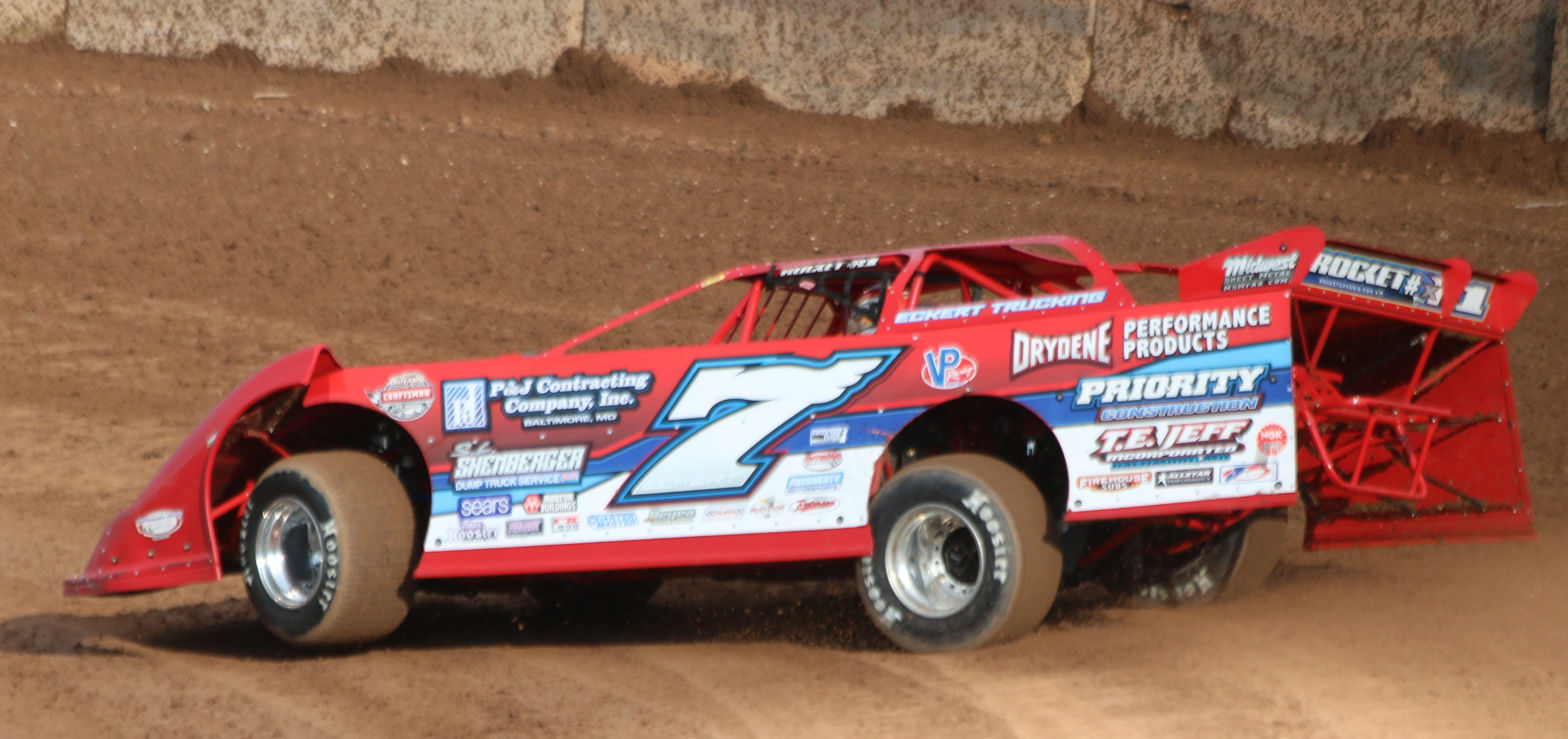
Rick Eckert in 2018

- Roger Dolan
- Rick Eckert
- Joe Merryfield
- Dale McDowell
- Kenny Simpson
- David & John Draime (Engine Builders)(Contributor)
- Joel Hedrick (Car Builder/Team Manager)(Contributor)
- Jim Wilson (Car Owner/Promoter)(Contributor)
- Gerald Dixon (Lifetime Achievement)
- Ray Traube (Lifetime Achievement)

2018

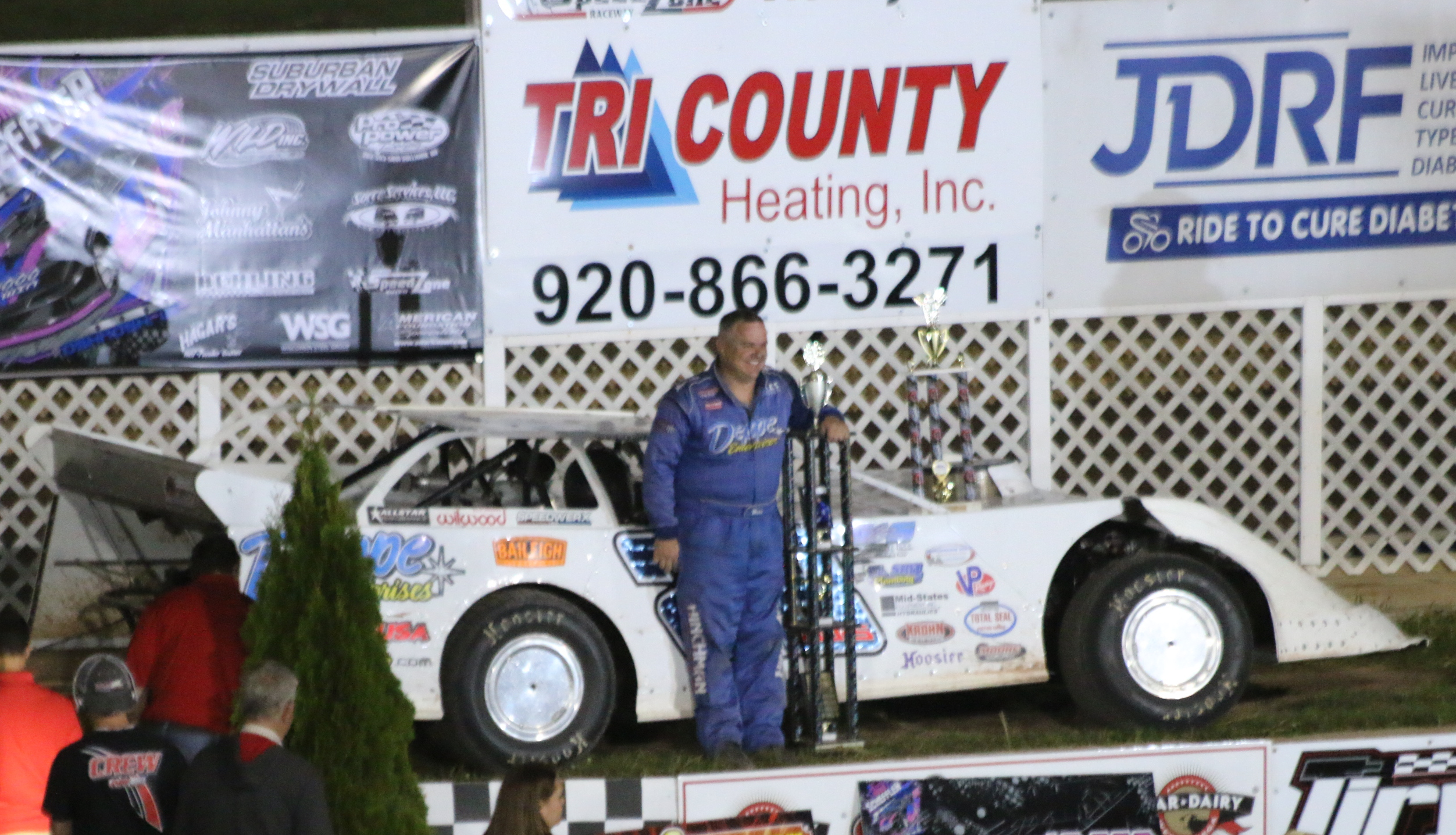
Jimmy Mars in 2016

- Steve Barnett
- Don Hoffman
- Jimmy Mars
- Steve Shaver
- Wendell Wallace
- Dottie & Lee Byers (Car Owners) (Contributor)
- the Cook Family (Track Owners/Promoters)(Contributor)
- Tony Hammett (Photographer)(Contributor)
- Mike Farr (Lifetime Achievement)
- Bubby James (Lifetime Achievement)

2019

- Wayne Brooks
- Stan Massey
- Billy Thomas
- Lil’ John Provenzano
- Kevin Weave
- Cornett Racing Engines
- Mooney Starr
- Keith Knaack
