= Ed Kosiski =

American racing driver

Ed Kosiski is an American racing driver who won the NASCAR Whelen All-American Series national championship in 1998.

Driving a family-owned dirt late model vehicle, Kosiski won 16 of the 18 races that he entered at a one-third-mile clay race track in Lincoln, Nebraska.

He is the younger brother of Joe Kosiski and Steve Kosiski, and son of the Bob Kosiski.

Kosiski competed in one ARCA Racing Series event in 1997. He finished 11th.

As part of the 25th anniversary of the NASCAR Weekly Series in 2006, Kosiski was named one of the series' All Time Top 25 drivers.

In 2011, Kosiski was convicted of Attempted 1st Degree Sexual Assault of a Child as part of an FBI investigation into a Nebraska sex trafficking ring. He was jailed and released in 2018.
