= Nick Pistone =

American racing driver

- Nationality: American
- Born: Charlotte, North Carolina, U.S.

NASCAR Goody's Dash Series career
- Debut season: 2002
- Years active: 2002–2003
- Starts: 13
- Championships: 0
- Wins: 0
- Poles: 0
- Best finish: 16th in 2002
- Statistics up to date as of December 23, 2024.

Nick Pistone (birth date unknown) is an American former professional stock car racing driver who competed in the NASCAR Goody's Dash Series from 2002 to 2003.

Pistone also competed in the ISCARS Dash Touring Series and the ARA Late Model Stock All-Star Tour.

== Motorsports results ==
=== NASCAR ===
(key) (Bold – Pole position awarded by qualifying time. Italics – Pole position earned by points standings or practice time. * – Most laps led.)

==== Goody's Dash Series ====
NASCAR Goody's Dash Series results
Year	Team	No.	Make	1	2	3	4	5	6	7	8	9	10	11	12	13	14	NGDS	Pts	Ref
2002	N/A	77	Toyota	DAY	HAR; 17	ROU; 23	LON; 8	CLT	KEN	MEM; 10	GRE; 8	SNM; 13	SBO; 23	MYB; 8	BRI; 26	MOT; 16	ATL; 19	16th	1290	
2003	N/A	77	Toyota	DAY; 29	OGL													40th	206	
2003	N/A	59	Toyota			CLT; 11	SBO	GRE	KEN	BRI	ATL							40th	206	
