= Arlene Pittman =

American racing driver

- Born: May 28, 1968 Lyons, Georgia, U.S.
- Died: December 26, 2011 (aged 43)

NASCAR Goody's Dash Series career
- Debut season: 2002
- Years active: 2002–2003
- Starts: 14
- Championships: 0
- Wins: 0
- Poles: 0
- Best finish: 15th in 2002
- Statistics up to date as of December 22, 2024.

Arlene Pittman (May 28, 1968 – December 26, 2011) was an American professional stock car racing driver who competed in the NASCAR Goody's Dash Series from 2002 to 2003.

Pittman died on December 26, 2011, following a lengthy battle with cancer, having been diagnosed in May of that year.

Pittman also competed in the National Late Model Super Car Series and the United Dirt Late Model Challenge Series.

== Motorsports results ==
=== NASCAR ===
(key) (Bold – Pole position awarded by qualifying time. Italics – Pole position earned by points standings or practice time. * – Most laps led.)

==== Goody's Dash Series ====
NASCAR Goody's Dash Series results
Year	Team	No.	Make	1	2	3	4	5	6	7	8	9	10	11	12	13	14	NGDS	Pts	Ref
2002	N/A	7	Pontiac	DAY	HAR; 14	ROU; 13	LON; 23	CLT; 18	KEN; 19	MEM; 20	GRE; 24	SNM; 24	SBO; 15	MYB; 19	BRI; DNQ	MOT; 20	ATL; 23	15th	1321	
2003	N/A	7	Pontiac	DAY; 39	OGL	CLT	SBO	GRE										47th	160	
2003	N/A	20	Mercury						KEN; 16	BRI	ATL							47th	160	
