= Bob Hill (racing driver) =

American racing driver

- Born: February 5, 1955 (age 71); Story City, Iowa, U.S.
- Achievements: 1993 NASCAR Busch All-Star Tour Champion; 1992 Gopher 50 Winner; 1988 IMCA Super Nationals Winner

ARCA Menards Series career
- 51 races run over 7 years
- Best finish: 4th (1995)
- First race: 1993 Allen Crowe Memorial 100 (Springfield)
- Last race: 2002 Federated Auto Parts 100 (DuQuoin)
- First win: 1994 Coors Allen Crowe Memorial 100 (Springfield)
- Last win: 1996 Southern Illinois 100 (DuQuoin)
Wins	Top tens	Poles
4	25	8
- Statistics up to date as of December 16, 2024.

Bob Hill (born February 5, 1955) is an American former professional stock car racing driver who has previously competed in the ARCA Re/Max Series from 1993 to 2002.

Hill has also previously competed in the USAC Late Model Series, the NASCAR All-Star Series, the IMCA Deery Brothers Summer Series, and the Grand-Am Rolex Sports Car Series.

== Motorsports results ==
=== ARCA Re/Max Series ===
(key) (Bold – Pole position awarded by qualifying time. Italics – Pole position earned by points standings or practice time. * – Most laps led. ** – All laps led.)

ARCA Re/Max Series results
Year	Team	No.	Make	1	2	3	4	5	6	7	8	9	10	11	12	13	14	15	16	17	18	19	20	21	22	23	24	25	ARMSC	Pts	Ref
1993	Ken Schrader Racing	26	Chevy	DAY	FIF	TWS	TAL	KIL	CMS	FRS	TOL	POC	MCH	FRS	POC	KIL	**ISF**; 26	DSF	TOL	SLM	WIN								N/A	0	
1993	Clement Racing	46	Chevy																			ATL; 4							N/A	0	
1994	Clement Racing	46	Chevy	DAY; 7	TAL; 6	FIF	LVL	KIL	TOL	FRS	MCH; 35	DMS; 12	POC	POC	KIL	FRS	**INF**; 32	I70	**ISF**; 1	DSF; 20	TOL	SLM; 6	WIN	ATL; 39					19th	1645	
1995	Clement Racing	46	Chevy	DAY; 5	ATL; 33	TAL; 10	FIF; 2*	KIL; 20	FRS; 16	MCH; 18	**I80**; 26	MCS; 12	FRS; 9	POC; 8	POC; 20	KIL; 7	FRS; 13	SBS; 8		**ISF**; 5	DSF; 1	SLM; 18	WIN; 4	ATL; 4					4th	5110	
1995	Clement Racing	46	Pontiac																LVL; 13										4th	5110	
1996	Clement Racing	46	Chevy	DAY; 14	ATL; 2	SLM	TAL; 13	FIF	LVL	CLT; 6	CLT; 26	KIL	FRS	POC; 6	MCH; 22	FRS	TOL	**POC**; 25	MCH; 25	**INF**; 1**	SBS	ISF; 8	**DSF**; 1*	KIL	SLM	WIN	CLT; 9	ATL; 42	11th	2410	
1998	Roulo Brothers Racing	39	Chevy	DAY	ATL	SLM	CLT	MEM	MCH	POC	SBS	TOL	PPR	POC	KIL	FRS	ISF; 4	ATL	DSF; 5	SLM	TEX	WIN	CLT	TAL	ATL				N/A	0	
2000	Ken Schrader Racing	52	Pontiac	DAY	SLM	AND	CLT; 30	KIL	FRS	MCH	POC	TOL	KEN	BLN	POC	WIN	ISF	KEN	DSF	SLM	CLT	TAL	ATL						130th	80	
2002	Roulo Brothers Racing	39	Chevy	DAY	ATL	NSH	SLM	KEN	CLT	KAN	POC	MCH	TOL	SBO	KEN	BLN	POC	NSH	ISF; 30	WIN	DSF; 28	CHI	SLM	TAL	CLT				122nd	170	
