= Lakeside Speedway =

Coordinates: 39°11′39″N 94°48′3″W

Lakeside Speedway is a 4/10 mile auto racing Dirt track located in Kansas City, Kansas. It features racing on a weekly basis from March to October, In, USRA Stock Car, USRA B-Mod, E-Modifieds, Pure Stock categories. Racing at the track is sanctioned by United States Racing Association.

== History ==
The track originally opened on April 17, 1955, at 92nd and Leavenworth Road. However, three deaths during the 1956 racing season forced its closure. Lakeside Speedway reopened under new management in 1961 and continued at the Leavenworth Road location through 1988 when developers for The Woodlands dog & horse racing track purchased the property. Lakeside Speedway then moved to its present location at 5615 Wolcott Drive, also in Kansas City, Kansas. The move enabled not only construction of modern grandstands and a press box, but also provided room for an adjacent campground for racing fans. From 1989 to 1999 Lakeside operated as a half-mile asphalt track. In 2000, it was again under new management, which converted the speedway to a high-banked 4/10-mile dirt track. Flooding is an ongoing concern at the facility due to its close proximity to the Missouri River.

== NASCAR connection ==
The track hosted one NASCAR Convertible Series event in 1956. The race was won by Frank Mundy. The NASCAR Midwest Series also ran one race at the speedway in 1999.

Among the notable NASCAR drivers who have raced at Lakeside Speedway is Clint Bowyer. Bowyer still holds several records at the track.

== Most wins(2000-2013) ==
Year	1st	2nd	3rd	4th	5th	6th	7th	8th	9th	10th	(Tied)
2000	Dave Brundage; 7	**Chad Lyle**; 5	Clint Bowyer; 3	**Marshall Jewett**; 3	Bobby Ohrenberg; 3	Dennis Belknap; 3	Johnny Saadhoff; 3	Frank Littrell; 2	Steve Newson; 2	Jason Moppin; 2	Carl Ewing; 2
2001	Clint Bowyer; 9	Dave Brundage; 7	Chad Lyle; 6	Bobby Ohrenberg; 6	Frank Littrell; 5	Dennis Belknap; 4	Wade Sherman; 4	**Danny Charles**; 4	**Marshall Jewett**; 3	Johnny Saadhoff; 3	**Karrick**, Billings, Boney; 3
2002	Clint Bowyer; 18	**Kerry Davis**; 18	**Tim Karrick**; 8	Dave Brundage; 7	**Chad Lyle**; 6	Bobby Ohrenberg; 6	Wade Sherman; 6	Frank Littrell; 5	**Danny Charles**; 5	Dennis Belknap; 4	Billings, Billings; 4
2003	**Kerry Davis**; 29	Clint Bowyer; 26	**Tim Karrick**; 10	Dave Brundage; 7	**Chad Lyle**; 7	Bobby Ohrenberg; 6	Wade Sherman; 6	Frank Littrell; 5	JR Billings; 5	Tom Charles; 5	**Charles**, Billings; 5
2004	**Kerry Davis**; 33	Clint Bowyer; 27	**Tim Karrick**; 15	**John O'Neal, Jr**; 11	**Chad Lyle**; 9	**Gene Claxton**; 8	Dave Brundage; 7	Tom Charles; 7	Bobby Ohrenberg; 6	Wade Sherman; 6	Billings, **Tranckino**, **Richards**; 5
2005	**Kerry Davis**; 34	Clint Bowyer; 27	**Tim Karrick**; 20	**Gene Claxton**; 18	**John O'Neal, Jr**; 15	**Chad Lyle**; 9	Dave Brundage; 7	Tom Charles; 7	Lynn Nelson; 7	Dustin Boney; 7	
2006	**Kerry Davis**; 38	Clint Bowyer; 27	**Tim Karrick**; 27	**Gene Claxton**; 25	**John O'Neal, Jr**; 15	**Chad Lyle**; 13	Lynn Nelson; 10	**John Allen**; 10	**Tim Shields**; 10	Tim Billings; 10	
2007	**Kerry Davis**; 41	**Tim Karrick**; 32	Clint Bowyer; 27	**Gene Claxton**; 26	**John O'Neal, Jr**; 15	**John Allen**; 15	**Tim Shields**; 15	Tim Billings; 14	**Chad Lyle**; 13	Lynn Nelson; 10	
2008	**Kerry Davis**; 43	**Tim Karrick**; 37	Clint Bowyer; 27	**Gene Claxton**; 27	**Tim Shields**; 17	**Chad Lyle**; 17	**Nic Bidinger**; 17	**John O'Neal, Jr**; 15	**John Allen**; 15	Tim Billings; 14	
2009	**Kerry Davis**; 45	**Tim Karrick**; 39	**Gene Claxton**; 28	Clint Bowyer; 27	**Nic Bidinger**; 19	**Tim Shields**; 18	**Chad Lyle**; 18	**John O'Neal, Jr**; 15	**John Allen**; 15	Tim Billings; 14	
2010	**Kerry Davis**; 45	**Tim Karrick**; 41	**Gene Claxton**; 32	Clint Bowyer; 27	**Nic Bidinger**; 20	**Tim Shields**; 19	**Chad Lyle**; 18	Tim Billings; 17	**John O'Neal, Jr**; 15	**John Allen**; 15	
2011	**Kerry Davis**; 45	**Tim Karrick**; 42	**Gene Claxton**; 34	Clint Bowyer; 27	**Tim Shields**; 21	**Nic Bidinger**; 20	Tim Billings; 19	**Chad Lyle**; 18	**John O'Neal, Jr**; 15	**John Allen**; 15	
2012	**Tim Karrick**; 48	**Kerry Davis**; 47	**Gene Claxton**; 37	Clint Bowyer; 27	**Tim Shields**; 23	**Nic Bidinger**; 21	Tim Billings; 20	**Chad Lyle**; 18	**John O'Neal, Jr**; 16	**John Allen**; 15	
2013	**Tim Karrick**; 48 (0)	**Kerry Davis**; 47 (0)	**Gene Claxton**; 39 (2)	Clint Bowyer; 27	**Tim Shields**; 25 (2)	**Nic Bidinger**; 24 (3)	Tim Billings; 20 (0)	**Chad Lyle**; 18 (0)	**Marshall Jewett**; 17 (3)	**John O'Neal, Jr**; 16 (0)	

This list includes point races only, no special races. Drivers in bold currently race at Lakeside Speedway. The numbers in parentheses represent how many wins the driver has this season.

Partially Updated September 27, 2014

Sources: Lakesidespeedway.net (JRfan), Speednetdirect.com, & racinboys.com

== Track championships ==
Rank	Driver name	championship's & years
1	Tim Karrick	13 (86,92,93,94,95,97,98,03,04,06,12,23,24)
2	Gene Claxton	11 (80,84,85,84,88,89,90,03,04,05,06)
3	Tim Shields	5(07,14,15,16,20)
4	Tony Sawyer	4 (91,92,94,96)
4	Brett Heeter	4 (09,13,14,15)
4	Tim Shields	4 (07,14,15,16)
5	Jim Martin	3 (71,72,73)
5	Mike Dibben	3 (74,75,76)
5	Joe Kosiski	3 (81,82,86)
5	Billy Deckman	3 (81,87,94)
5	Joe Schoenberger	3 (90,91,93)
5	Les Foster	3 (94,96,97)
5	Buz Kaster	3 (87,89,08)
5	Tom Charles	3 (84,05,10)
5	Bobby Layne	3 (76,77,84)
5	Nic Bidinger	3 (08,13,14)
5	Chad Clancy	3 (09,14,16)
5	Chad Lyle	3 (00,03,08)

Last updated October 23, 2024

== Track champions year by year ==
Year	Driver name	Class
1955	No Champ	No Champ
1956	Unknown	Unknown
1957	Closed	Closed
1958	Closed	Closed
1959	Closed	Closed
1960	Closed	Closed
1961	Unknown	Unknown
1962	Unknown	Unknown
1963	Greg Weld	Super Modified
1964	Unknown	Unknown
1965	Unknown	Unknown
1966	Jerry Weld	Super Modified
1966	Lewis Taylor	Modified Stock
1967	Jerry Weld	Super Modified
1967	Thurman Lovejoy	Late Model
1967	Lester Friebe	Modified Stock
1967	Tom Faircloth	Hobo
1968	Fred Whistler	Late Model
1968	Jim Hager	Modified Stock
1968	Harold Montary	Hobo
1969	Jim Still	Modified Stock
1969	Dick Michaels	Hobo
1969	Lewis Taylor	Late Model Stock
1970	Terry Bivins	Super Stock
1970	Gene Bond	Hobo
1970	Bob Olson	Mini Stock
1971	Terry Bivins	Super Stock
1971	Bill Ufford, Sr	Hobo Stock
1971	Roger Arnhart	Mini Modified
1971	Denny Crooks	Mini Stock
1971	Jim Martin	American Compact
1972	Gene Chapman	Super Stock
1972	Jon Wagner	Hobby Stock
1972	Roger Arnhart	Mini Modified
1972	Cliff Lawrence	Mini Stock
1972	Jim Martin	Mini American Compact
1973	Bud Dibben	Late Model Stock
1973	Darryl Foley	Semi Stock
1973	Cliff Lawrence	Mini Stock
1973	Jim Martin	American Compact
1974	Mike Dibben	Late Model stock
1974	Ray Lindsey	Semi Stock
1974	Bill Curtis	Modified Sprint
1974	Richard Johnson	Modified Mini
1975	Mike Dibben	Late Model
1975	Kenny Price	Semi Stock
1976	Mike Dibben	Late Model
1976	Bobby Layne	Sprint
1977	Joe Wallace	Late Model
1977	Bobby Layne	Sprint
1978	Bob Kosiski	Late Model
1978	Gene Gennetten	Sprint
1979	John Oswalt	Late Model
1979	Duane Isaacs	Hobbie Stock
1979	Tim Green	Sprint Cars
1980	Gene Claxton	Late Model
1980	Ken Bisel	Hobby Stock
1980	Gary Scott	Sprint Cars
1981	Joe Kosiski	Late Model
1981	Galen Schaefer	Sportsman Stock Cars
1981	Bill Utz	Sprint Cars
1981	Billy Deckman	Street Stock
1982	Kenny King	Street Stock
1982	Tom Wunder	Limited Late Model
1982	Joe Kosiski	Late Model
1982	Bill Robison	Sprint Car
1983	Rick Beebe	Late Model
1983	Rusty Hilderman	Limited Late Model
1983	Kenny King	Street Stock
1984	Gene Claxton	Late Model
1984	Tom Charles	Street Stock
1984	Bobby Layne	IMCA Modified
1985	Gene Claxton	Late Model
1985	Terry Ford	Street Stock
1985	Duane Walker	Modified
1986	Joe Kosiski	Late Model
1986	Tim Karrick	Sportsman Streets
1986	Duane Walker	Modified
1986	Chris Littrell	Strickly Street
1987	Gene Claxton	Late Model
1987	Billy Deckman	Sportsman
1987	Buz Kaster	Modified
1987	Mike Hoenshell	Charger
1988	Gene Claxton	NASCAR Late Model
1988	Tom Wunder	NASCAR Sportsman
1988	Pat Gann	NASCAR Modified
1988	Bob Bowman	NASCAR Charger
1989	Gene Claxton	NASCAR Late Model
1989	Buz Kaster	Modified
1989	Elizabeth Harvey	4 Cylinder Pony Stock
1989	Dave Perkins	Charger
1989	Mark Remboldt	Sportsman
1990	Joe Schoenberger	Pure Pony Stock
1990	Dave Cotterman	Open Pony Stock
1990	Larry Starkey	Street Stock
1990	Steve Vest	Super Stock
1990	Troy Backlund	Modified
1990	Gene Claxton	Late Model
1991	Joe Schoenberger	Pure Pony Stock
1991	Dave Cotterman	Open Pony Stock
1991	Tony Sawyer	Charger
1991	Jamie Hager	Modified
1991	Larry Phillips	Late Model
1992	Larry Phillips	Late Model
1992	Tim Karrick	Modified
1992	Tony Sawyer	Charger
1992	Leroy Holler	4 Cylinder Pony Stocks
1993	Russ Phillips	Late Model
1993	Tim Karrick	Modified
1993	Jeff Klem	Chargers
1993	Joe Schoenberger	4 Cylinder Pony Stocks
1993	Darrin Christy	Pure Street Stock
1994	Billy Deckman	NASCAR Late Model
1994	Tim Karrick	NASCAR Modified
1994	Tony Sawyer	NASCAR Chargers
1994	John Steenstry	NASCAR 4 Cylinder Pony Stock
1994	Les Foster	NASCAR Pure Street Stock
1995	Larry "Bubba" Harvey	Late Model
1995	Tim Karrick	Modified
1995	Barry Cowden	Charger
1995	Erich Hamdorf	Pony Stock
1995	Tim Edwards	Street Stock
1996	John O’Neal, Jr	Late Model
1996	Ron Hartford	Modified
1996	Tony Sawyer	Charger
1996	Robert Lawrence	Pony Stock
1996	Les Foster	Street Stock
1997	Tim Karrick	Modified
1997	Jim Carey	Charger
1997	Richie Furrell	Pony Stock
1997	Les Foster	Street Stock
1998	Tim Karrick	Modified
1998	Jeff Atchley	Sportsman Late Model
1998	Bob Haugsness	Pony Stock
1998	Steve Newson	Struck
1999	Mike Klem	Modified
1999	Jeff Atchley	Sportsman Late Model
1999	Jake McHenry	Pony Stock
1999	Steve Newson	Struck
2000	Chad Lyle	Modified
2000	Dave Brundage	Grand National
2000	Carl Ewing	Factory Stock
2001	Clint Bowyer	Modified
2001	Bobby Ohrenberg	Grand National
2001	Danny Charles	Factory Stock
2002	Clint Bowyer	Modified
2002	Kerry Davis	Grand National
2002	Tim Billings	Factory Stock
2003	Chad Lyle	Modified
2003	Gene Claxton	Grand National
2003	Jake Richards	Factory Stock
2004	Tim Karrick	Modified
2004	Gene Claxton	Grand National
2004	Jake Richards	Factory Stock
2005	Tom Charles	Modified
2005	Gene Claxton	Grand National
2005	Jim Baker	Factory Stock
2006	Tim Karrick	Modified
2006	Gene Claxton	Grand National
2006	Lynn Nelson	Factory Stock
2007	John Allen	Modified
2007	Tim Billings	Grand National
2007	Tim Shields	Factory Stock
2008	Chad Lyle	Modified
2008	Nic Bidinger	Grand National
2008	Buz Kaster	Factory Stock
2009	Danny Charles	Modified
2009	Chad Clancy	Grand National
2009	Brett Heeter	Factory Stock
2010	Tom Charles	Modified
2010	Chad Shaw	Grand National
2010	Marshall Jewett	Factory Stock
2011	Aaron Marrant	Modified
2011	Mike Ryun	Grand National
2011	Caleb McClellan	Factory Stock
2011	Mike Tanner	B Modified
2012	Tim Karrick	Modified
2012	Kelby Ostrander	Grand National
2012	Justin Seifert	Factory Stock
2012	Nick Newton	B Modified
2013	Nic Bidinger	USRA Modified
2013	Gary Donaldson	Grand National
2013	Brett Heeter	USRA Stock Car
2013	Aaron Marrant	USRA B Modified
2014	Nic Bidinger	USRA Modified
2014	Tim Shields	Grand National
2014	Brett Heeter	USRA Stock Car
2014	Chad Clancy	USRA B Mod
2015	Kerry Davis	USRA Modified
2015	Tim Shields	Grand National
2015	Brett Heeter	USRA Stock Car
2015	Ed Noll	USRA B Modified
2016	Kerry Davis	USRA Modified
2016	Tim Shields	Grand National
2016	Trevor Hunt	USRA Stock Car
2016	Chad Clancy	USRA B Modified
2016	Jason Ryun	Factory Stock
2018	Mark Schafman	USRA Modified
2018	Tim Powell	USRA B Modified
2018	Kevin Anderson	USRA Stock Car
2018	Marshall Jewett	Factory Stock
2018	Kacey Shields	Grand National
2018	Billy Spartman	E Modified
2020	Gary Billings Jr	Pure Stock
2020	Rodney Schweizer	E Modified
2020	Tyler Hibner	USRA Modified
2020	Patrick Royalty	USRA B Modified
2020	Tim Shields	USRA Stock Car
2021	Marshall Jewett	Pure Stock
2021	Trever Hand	E Modified
2021	Nic Bidinger	USRA Modified
2021	Mark Schafman	USRA B Modified
2021	Kacey Shields	USRA Stock Car
2022	Darren Schimidt	Pure Stock
2022	Buz Kaster	E Modified
2022	Tim Powell	USRA B Modified
2022	Nic Bidinger	USRA Modified
2022	Doug Keller	USRA Stock Car
2023	Marshall Jewett	Pure Stock
2023	Chris Dishong	E Modified
2023	Luke Nieman	USRA B Modified
2023	Tim Karrick	USRA Modified
2023	Darren Schimidt	USRA Stock Car
2024	Jaylen Wettengel	USRA Stock Car
2024	Tim Karrick	USRA B Modified
2024	Ed Noll	Pure Stock
2024	Paul Carter	E Modified

Last updated October 23, 2024
