= Kings Mountain =

Kings Mountain may refer to:

== Places ==
- Kings Mountain (Alaska), a summit in Alaska
- Kings Mountain, California, an unincorporated community in San Mateo County
- Kings Mountain, Kentucky, an unincorporated community
- Kings Mountain, North Carolina, a city in North Carolina
  - Kings Mountain Mine, a lithium mine near the city of Kings Mountain
  - Kings Pinnacle, a mountain in North Carolina near the city of Kings Mountain
- Kings Mountain National Military Park near Blacksburg, South Carolina
- Kings Mountain State Park, a state park in South Carolina that is adjacent to the National Military Park

== Other uses ==
- Battle of Kings Mountain, a battle of the American Revolutionary War
- Kings Mountain Railroad, a former shortline railroad that served South Carolina
- Kings Mountain manzanita or Arctostaphylos regismontana, a shrub
