= Stick Elliott =

American racing driver

- Born: Gene Daves; July 27, 1934; Shelby, North Carolina, U.S.
- Died: November 1, 1980 (aged 46)
- Awards: National Dirt Late Model Hall of Fame inductee, 2009

NASCAR Cup Series career
- 93 races run over 7 years
- Best finish: 23rd (1963)
- First race: 1962 untitled race (Concord)
- Last race: 1971 American 500 (North Carolina)
Wins	Top tens	Poles
0	15	0

Gene "Stick Elliott" Daves (July 27, 1934 – November 1, 1980) was an American professional stock car racing driver. He was a driver in the NASCAR Winston Cup Series from 1962 to 1971. He was a 2009 inductee in the National Dirt Late Model Hall of Fame.
