= Roger Dolan =

Roger Dolan (May 5, 1936 – October 17, 2023) was an American racing driver who won the NASCAR Weekly Series national championship in 1987.

Driving a dirt Late Model for owners Larry and Penny Eckrich, Dolan won 33 of the 67 NASCAR-sanctioned races that he entered. He often raced five nights a week, and won the NASCAR All Star Tour for dirt Late Models.

Dolan also won the inaugural Busch/Winston All-Star Tour series championship in 1985.

Dolan died on October 17, 2023, at the age of 87.

== Honors ==
- As part of the 25th anniversary of the NASCAR Weekly Series in 2006, Dolan was named one of the series' All Time Top 25 drivers.

Sporting positions
Preceded by Inaugural	NASCAR Busch All-Star Tour Champion; 1985	Succeeded by Joe Kosiski
