= 2002 NASCAR Goody's Dash Series =

The 2002 NASCAR Goody's Dash Series was the 28th and penultimate season of the NASCAR Goody's Dash Series. It began at Daytona International Speedway on February 9 and concluded at Atlanta Motor Speedway on October 25. Cam Strader entered the season as the defending Drivers' Champion. Jake Hobgood won his first and only championship, 66 points in front of Robert Huffman.

== Schedule ==
No.	Race title	Track	Date
1	Daytona USA 150	Daytona International Speedway, Daytona Beach, Florida	February 9
2	South Carolina 150	Hardeeville Motor Speedway, Hardeeville, South Carolina	April 6
3	Orange County 150	Orange County Speedway, Rougemont, North Carolina	April 27
4	Food City 150	Lonesome Pine Speedway, Coeburn, Virginia	May 11
5	Tom Johnson Camping Centers/EasyCare Vehicle Service Contracts 100	Lowe's Motor Speedway, Concord, North Carolina	May 23
6	700 WLW 100	Kentucky Speedway, Sparta, Kentucky	June 18
7	Goody's Dash 125	Memphis Motorsports Park, Millington, Tennessee	June 22
8	Kevin Whitaker Chevrolet 100	Greenville-Pickens Speedway, Greenville, South Carolina	June 14
9	Aycock Auto Auction 150	Southern National Motorsports Park, Kenly, North Carolina	July 27
10	Travel Club International 150	South Boston Speedway, South Boston, Virginia	August 3
11	Piggly Wiggly 150 presented by Wesson Cooking Oil and Peter Pan Peanut Butter	Myrtle Beach Speedway, Myrtle Beach, South Carolina	August 10
12	Pabst Blue Ribbon 150	Bristol Motor Speedway, Bristol, Tennessee	August 21
13	Goody's Dash 150 presented by Travel Club International	Motordrome Speedway, Smithton, Pennsylvania	September 13
14	Georgia-Pacific 150	Atlanta Motor Speedway, Hampton, Georgia	October 25

== Results and standings ==
=== Races ===
No.	Race	Pole position	Most laps led	Winning driver	Manufacturer
1	Daytona USA 150	Larry Caudill	Justin Hobgood	Robert Huffman	Toyota
2	South Carolina 150	Scott Weaver	Cam Strader	Robert Huffman	Toyota
3	Orange County 150	David Hutto	David Hutto	Justin Hobgood	Pontiac
4	Food City 150	Justin Hobgood	Zach Brewer	Zach Brewer	Pontiac
5	Tom Johnson Camping Centers/EasyCare Vehicle Service Contracts 100	Justin Hobgood	Robert Huffman	Robert Huffman	Toyota
6	700 WLW 100	Robert Huffman	Robert Huffman	Jake Hobgood	Pontiac
7	Goody's Dash 125	Robert Huffman	Danny Bagwell	Danny Bagwell	Mercury
8	Kevin Whitaker Chevrolet 100	Robert Huffman	Jake Hobgood	Jake Hobgood	Pontiac
9	Aycock Auto Auction 150	Justin Hobgood	Robert Huffman	Cam Strader	Mercury
10	Travel Club International 150	Justin Hobgood	Justin Hobgood	Justin Hobgood	Pontiac
11	Piggly Wiggly 150 presented by Wesson Cooking Oil and Peter Pan Peanut Butter	Scott Weaver	Jake Hobgood	Jake Hobgood	Pontiac
12	Pabst Blue Ribbon 150	Robert Huffman	Jake Hobgood	Scott Weaver	Pontiac
13	Goody's Dash 150 presented by Travel Club International	Cam Strader	Justin Hobgood	Justin Hobgood	Pontiac
14	Georgia-Pacific 150	Justin Hobgood	Zach Brewer	Zach Brewer	Pontiac

=== Drivers' championship ===
(key) Bold - Pole position awarded by time. Italics - Pole position set by final practice results or rainout. * – Most laps led.

Pos	Driver	DAY	HAR	ROU	LON	CLT	KEN	MEM	GRE	SNM	SBO	MYB	BRI	MOT	ATL	Points
1	Jake Hobgood	2	2	2	5	10	1	5	1**	3	11	1*	8*	2	20	2204
2	Robert Huffman	1	1	5	18	1*	2*	**4**	**4**	4*	5	24	**9**	6	6	2138
3	Justin Hobgood	5*	16	1	**6**	**2**	10	18	13	**2**	**1***	3	13	1*	**4**	2116
4	Zach Brewer	29	6	4	1*	6	7	7	7	8	10	4	4	7	1**	2076
5	Cam Strader	4	3*	21	21	5	5	2	6	1	2	2	23	**3**	12	2061
6	Scott Weaver	31	**8**	27	12	7	12	3	2	10	6	**5**	1	5	8	1945
7	Danny Bagwell	37	4	10	2	4	22	1*	3	9	28	9	14	8	5	1891
8	Randy Humphrey	25	12	6	11	9	25	8	9	7	12	11	18	9	2	1821
9	Chuck Gafrarar	12	7	7	3	31	4	12	5	19	17	12	15	22	7	1801
10	Brandon Ward	7	23	16	24	23	8	6	23	18	8	25	3	4	3	1755
11	Mike Watts	23	18	17	20	21	6	17	20	11	3	13	28	10	14	1636
12	Kelly Sutton	11	21	22	19	17	11	9	18	22	20	22	12	14	15	1585
13	Brian Lofton	9	9	25	7	13	21	19	16	6	24	7	16			1457
14	Gary Moore	27	5	9	13	22	18	11	15	21	13		22	DNQ		1349
15	Arlene Pittman		14	13	23	18	19	20	24	24	15	19	DNQ	20	23	1321
16	Nick Pistone		17	23	8			10	8	13	23	8	26	16	19	1290
17	Ned Combs	17				8	3	15			7	14	11	12		1061
18	Richard Callihan			26	14			13	25	16	14	16	DNQ	13		972
19	Eric Wilson	3				11			11	14	25		10		17	880
20	Jay Godley		15	19	4				12	23	21		21			805
21	Reece Milton		22	18	17			14			18		7	19		800
22	Johnny Chapman	38				3	23		21	20			5			666
23	David Hutto	6	10	**3***	22	26										631
24	Scott Haller									17	16	10		11	9	629
25	Scott Krehling	30				24	9			12			DNQ		11	623
26	Wayne Edwards	39					17		22	25		26	DNQ		DNQ	580
27	Tim Nichols	26	20	20	15	12										529
28	Greg Goodell		11	12		19			27				DNQ			515
29	Phil Pittman										27	15	DNQ	18	10	501
30	Adam Dean				9						4	23	25			475
31	Doc Brewer	19				35				15			27			440
32	Joey Miller	14								5			6			426
33	Dean Combs						14		19		22	21				424
34	Keith Roggen	40		24								20	2			407
35	Roger Moser	24				25		16							DNQ	373
36	Kevin Williams		19	15	16											339
37	Charles Turner		13	14											24	336
38	David Heitzhaus	10				14										255
39	Mike McConnell	21		8												242
40	Angie Wilson	42							17				24			240
41	Chris Bristol													17	13	236
42	B. J. Mackey	15				16										233
43	Roger Sawyer	22							10							231
44	Billy Clevenger											17		15		230
45	Ricky Gonzalez								14					21		220
46	Alan Powell						16	21								215
47	Eric McClure												17		DNQ	200
48	Andy Winstead								26			18				194
49	Alex Ferree													23	22	190
50	Shane Riffel				10								DNQ			186
51	Ray Paprota													DNQ	21	184
52	Junior Miller	16				32										182
53	J. R. Robbs					28							20			182
54	Maxie Bush					34	15									179
55	Mickey York	36				15										173
56	Mike Gaines	34				20										164
57	Greg Miller	DNQ					13									158
58	Shane Hmiel											6				150
59	Wayne Morrow					36	24									146
60	Larry Caudill	**8**														142
61	Peyton Sellers										9					138
62	Shane Brafford			11												130
63	Jimmy Foster	13														124
64	Larry Stigars														16	115
65	Dan Shaver	41				30										113
66	Eddie Kelley	18														109
67	Glenn Styres														18	109
68	Jason York												19			106
69	Michael Conover										19					106
70	John Whaley	DNQ				29										105
71	Nolan Wilson	20														103
72	Vince Whitmore						20									103
73	Mark Howard													24		90
74	Wendy Hicks													DNQ		87
75	Dion Ciccarelli						26									85
76	Ricky Bryant										26					85
77	Robert Bruce														DNQ	85
78	Tommy Spangler					27										82
79	Bill Hennecy	28														79
80	Steven Christian	32														67
81	Matt Johnson												DNQ			67
82	Mike Swaim	33														64
83	Danny Snell					33										64
84	Doug Gainey	35														58
85	Drew Pollock												DNQ			55
86	Gary Terry	DNQ														31
87	James Trout	DNQ														26
Pos	Driver	DAY	HAR	ROU	LON	CLT	KEN	MEM	GRE	SNM	SBO	MYB	BRI	MOT	ATL	Points

== See also ==
- 2002 NASCAR Winston Cup Series
- 2002 NASCAR Busch Series
- 2002 NASCAR Craftsman Truck Series
- 2002 ARCA Re/Max Series
