= Eric Wilson (racing driver) =

American racing driver (born 1970)

- Born: September 15, 1970 (age 56); Taylorsville, North Carolina, U.S.

NASCAR O'Reilly Auto Parts Series career
- 2 races run over 1 year
- Best finish: 74th (1989)
- First race: 1989 Pepsi 200 (Hickory)
- Last race: 1989 Texas Pete 200 (Rougemont)
Wins	Top tens	Poles
0	0	0
- Statistics up to date as of December 6, 2024.

Eric Wilson (born September 15, 1970) is an American former professional stock car racing driver who has competed in the NASCAR Busch Series and the NASCAR Goody's Dash Series.

Wilson has also previously competed in the IPOWER Dash Series and the ISCARS Dash Series, where he won the championship in 2006.

== Motorsports results ==
=== NASCAR ===
(key) (Bold - Pole position awarded by qualifying time. Italics - Pole position earned by points standings or practice time. * – Most laps led.)

==== Busch Series ====
NASCAR Busch Series results
Year	Team	No.	Make	1	2	3	4	5	6	7	8	9	10	11	12	13	14	15	16	17	18	19	20	21	22	23	24	25	26	27	28	29	NBSC	Pts	Ref
1989	Wilson Racing	19	Olds	DAY	CAR	MAR	HCY	DAR	BRI	NZH	SBO	LAN	NSV	CLT	DOV	ROU	LVL	VOL	MYB	SBO	HCY; 31	DUB	IRP	ROU; 26	BRI	DAR	RCH	DOV	MAR	CLT; DNQ	CAR	MAR	74th	155	

==== Goody's Dash Series ====
NASCAR Goody's Dash Series results
Year	Team	No.	Make	1	2	3	4	5	6	7	8	9	10	11	12	13	14	15	16	17	18	19	20	21	NGDS	Pts	Ref
1994	Wilson Racing	19	Chevy	DAY	VOL	FLO	SUM	CAR	411	HCY; 13	LAN	BRI	SUM	FLO	BGS	MYB	NRV; 21	ASH	VOL	HCY; 26					40th	309	
1997	N/A	92	Pontiac	DAY; 25	HOM	KIN	MYB	LAN	CAR	TRI	FLO	HCY	BRI	GRE	SNM	CLT	MYB	LAN	SUM	STA					60th	215	
1997	N/A	4	Pontiac																		HCY; 12	USA	CON	HOM	60th	215	
2002	N/A	4	Pontiac	DAY; 3	HAR	ROU	LON	CLT; 11	KEN	MEM	GRE; 11	SNM; 14	SBO; 25	MYB	BRI; 10	MOT	ATL; 17								19th	880	
2003	N/A	4	Pontiac	DAY; 8	OGL; 13	CLT; 32	SBO; 16	GRE; 13	KEN; 4	BRI; 11															7th	1008	
2003	N/A	4	Toyota								ATL; 7														7th	1008	

Sporting positions
Preceded by Wade Day	ISCARS Dash Touring Champion; 2006	Succeeded by Danny Bagwell
