= Busch All-Star Tour =

Former NASCAR series

- Category: Dirt track racing
- Country: United States
- Region: Midwestern
- Inaugural season: 1985
- Folded: 2002

The Busch All-Star Tour was a NASCAR-sanctioned dirt track late model racing series. The series, based in the Midwestern United States, started in 1985 and folded in 2002, and was NASCAR's only national dirt racing series.

== History ==
The series held its first race at Adams County Speedway in Corning, Iowa, and was won by Steve Kosiski. Kosiski became the most successful driver in series history with 50 victories and seven championships; his brother Joe was the second most successful driver, with 45 wins and five championships. Although the tour was primarily situated in the Midwest, the series also expanded to tracks outside the region. Among the tracks that played host to Busch All-Star Tour races included Lakeside Speedway, I-80 Speedway, Eagle Raceway, I-70 Speedway, Hawkeye Downs Speedway and Iowa State Fair Speedway The series was eventually renamed the O'Reilly Auto Parts All-Star Series, and the tour was discontinued after 2002 by NASCAR, as it decided to shift its focus to its Weekly Racing Series (now the Whelen All-American Series). NASCAR's top national series didn't return to dirt until the Camping World Truck Series ran the 2013 Mudsummer Classic at Eldora Speedway.

== Notable people ==
Notable personnel who worked with the tour included John Darby, the current Sprint Cup Series director, who worked as chief technical inspector for the tour, along with Motor Racing Network writer Pete Pistone, who served as public relations director for approximately four seasons. The Series Director, throughout the entire 17-year run of the series, was Jim Wilson, a 23-year NASCAR veteran, who later went on to found the WORLD Dirt Racing League. Among the noted winners in the series included 2000 Weekly Racing Series national champion Gary Webb, Xfinity Series driver Mike Wallace and former Cup Series driver Ken Schrader.

== List of series champions ==
Year	Champion	Points (Margin)
1985	Roger Dolan	960 (1)
1986	Joe Kosiski	2239 (47)
1987	Steve Kosiski	2311 (10)
1988	Joe Kosiski	2339 (56)
1989	Joe Kosiski	2345 (38)
1990	Steve Kosiski	2492 (135)
1991	Steve Kosiski	2639 (138)
1992	Steve Kosiski	2927 (89)
1993	Bob Hill	2460 (86)
1994	Steve Kosiski	3149 (124)
1995	Steve Kosiski	2656 (49)
1996	Joe Kosiski	2586 (19)
1997	Joe Kosiski	2334 (8)
1998	Steve Kosiski	2950 (14)
1999	Ray Guss, Jr.	2497 (57)
2000	Steve Boley	3062 (209)
2001	Kyle Berck	2436 (11)

== See also ==
- Lucas Oil Late Model Dirt Series
- World of Outlaws Late Model Series
