= 2003 NASCAR Goody's Dash Series =

The 2003 NASCAR Goody's Dash Series was the 29th and final season of the NASCAR Goody's Dash Series. It began at Daytona International Speedway on February 9 and concluded at Atlanta Motor Speedway on October 28. Jake Hobgood entered the season as the defending Drivers' Champion. Robert Huffman won his fifth and final championship, 129 points in front of Justin Hobgood.

This was the final season before NASCAR sold the series to IPOWER (International Participants Of Winning Edge Racing) for the following year.

== Schedule ==
No.	Race title	Track	Date
1	Goody's Dash 150	Daytona International Speedway, Daytona Beach, Florida	February 9
2	Lucas Oil 150	Oglethrope Speedway Park, Pooler, Georgia	April 5
3	EasyCare 100	Lowe's Motor Speedway, Concord, North Carolina	May 17
4	Goody's Dash 150	South Boston Speedway, South Boston, Virginia	June 14
5	Goody's Dash 100	Greenville-Pickens Speedway, Greenville, South Carolina	June 30
6	Kentucky 150	Kentucky Speedway, Sparta, Kentucky	July 15
7	Pabst Blue Ribbon 150	Bristol Motor Speedway, Bristol, Tennessee	August 21
8	Brawny 150	Atlanta Motor Speedway, Hampton, Georgia	October 28

== Results and standings ==
=== Races ===
No.	Race	Pole position	Winning driver	Manufacturer
1	Goody's Dash 150	Johnny Chapman	Robert Huffman	Pontiac
2	Lucas Oil 150	Jake Hobgood	Danny Bagwell	Mercury
3	EasyCare 100	Randy Humphrey	Robert Huffman	Pontiac
4	Goody's Dash 150	Brandon Ward	Jake Hobgood	Toyota
5	Goody's Dash 100	Justin Hobgood	Cam Strader	Mercury
6	Kentucky 150	Justin Hobgood	Robert Huffman	Pontiac
7	Pabst Blue Ribbon 150	Justin Hobgood	Cam Strader	Mercury
8	Brawny 150	Wade Day	Justin Hobgood	Pontiac

=== Drivers' championship ===
(key) Bold - Pole position awarded by time. Italics - Pole position set by final practice results or rainout. * – Most laps led.

Pos	Driver	DAY	OGL	CLT	SBO	GRE	KEN	BRI	ATL	Points
1	Robert Huffman	1	4	1	4	6	1	2	5	1335
2	Justin Hobgood	7	2	7	2	**11**	**2**	**23**	1	1206
3	Jake Hobgood	3	**18**	8	1	2	11	9	4	1194
4	Randy Humphrey	9	6	**9**	21	5	23	6	10	1058
5	Brandon Ward	5	7	26	**3**	3	27	21	6	1048
6	Danny Bagwell	20	1	34	5	20	3	22	3	1029
7	Eric Wilson	8	13	32	16	13	4	11	7	1008
8	Kelly Sutton	17	11	19	10	10	10	15	22	965
9	T. J. Majors	24	8	10	6	12	18	31	13	947
10	Scott Weaver	40	9	24	7	18	6	4	24	927
11	Mike Watts	15	12	30	9	15	17	10	21	920
12	Ned Combs	12	20	36	11	9	7	29	9	913
13	Jay Godley	37	3	12	19	7	22	25	18	890
14	Joey Miller	28	5	22	25	4		14	2	870
15	Greg Goodell	13	19	16	20	22	13	20		772
16	Mickey York	16		6	26	25	5	27	23	769
17	Billy Clevenger			20	17	14	9	18	8	725
18	Gary Moore	26			15	19	14	13	14	675
19	Johnny Chapman	**14**		5		21	25	3		629
20	Zach Brewer	6	16	35	8			8		607
21	Chuck Gafrarar	34		4	23		26	7		546
22	Ricky Bryant	23		2			8	12		533
23	Scott Krehling	4	10	42			21	32		498
24	Cam Strader	10				1		1		494
25	Scott Haller	38	15	DNQ	13	23	31			476
26	Reece Milton	30		DNQ	12	8		30		446
27	Robert Bruce				24	16	19	19		418
28	Michael Guerity		22	39	27		20	26		413
29	Brian Loftin	22		25	18			16		409
30	David Heitzhaus	18		3			12			401
31	Danny Snell	DNQ	17	18					11	351
32	Wally Leatherwood	33		37			15		16	349
33	Wade Day				22	DSQ		24	**20**	291
34	Richard Callihan	25		15			29			282
35	Mike McConnell	11	23	40						267
36	Roger Moser	36	14	28						255
37	Greg Miller	21		13						224
38	Ricky Gonzalez	31		DNQ					12	216
39	Angie Wilson	19		21						206
40	Nick Pistone	29		11						206
41	Ray Paprota		21						19	206
42	Mike Gaines	27		17						194
43	Jason York	DNQ		23			24			185
44	Tim Hayes						30		17	185
45	John Whaley			31				17		183
46	Dusty Williams	2								170
47	Arlene Pittman	39					16			160
48	Keith Roggen							5		155
49	Jeff Tillman			33			32			131
50	Curtis Francois			38			28			128
51	Michael Adams			14						121
52	Matt Boarman				14					121
53	Kevin Williams								15	118
54	Jamie McKinney					17				112
55	Doc Brewer	35		41						98
56	Chris Russel					24				91
57	Alan Powell			27						82
58	Junior Miller							28		79
59	Matt Johnson				28					79
60	Maxie Bush			29						76
61	Bill Hennecy	32								67
62	Phil Pittman	41								38
63	Caleb Holman			DNQ						34
64	Chris Bristol			DNQ						28
65	Steve Barnes			DNQ						25
	Sean Murphy	42								0
Pos	Driver	DAY	OGL	CLT	SBO	GRE	KEN	BRI	ATL	Points

== See also ==
- 2003 NASCAR Winston Cup Series
- 2003 NASCAR Busch Series
- 2003 NASCAR Craftsman Truck Series
- 2003 ARCA Re/Max Series
