= Richard Callihan =

American racing driver

- Nationality: American
- Born: February 28, 1961 (age 65) Flatwoods, Kentucky, U.S.

NASCAR Goody's Dash Series career
- Debut season: 2002
- Years active: 2002–2003
- Starts: 11
- Championships: 0
- Wins: 0
- Poles: 0
- Best finish: 18th in 2002
- Statistics up to date as of December 23, 2024.

Richard Callihan (born February 28, 1961) is an American former professional stock car racing driver who competed in the NASCAR Goody's Dash Series from 2002 to 2003.

Callihan has previously competed in the IPOWER Dash Series and the Northern Xtreme DirtCar Series.

== Motorsports results ==
=== NASCAR ===
(key) (Bold – Pole position awarded by qualifying time. Italics – Pole position earned by points standings or practice time. * – Most laps led.)

==== Goody's Dash Series ====
NASCAR Goody's Dash Series results
| Year | Team | No. | Make | 1 | 2 | 3 | 4 | 5 | 6 | 7 | 8 | 9 | 10 | 11 | 12 | 13 | 14 | NGDS | Pts | Ref |
|---|---|---|---|---|---|---|---|---|---|---|---|---|---|---|---|---|---|---|---|---|
| 2002 | Callihan Motorsports | 48 | Pontiac | DAY | HAR | ROU; 26 | LON; 14 | CLT | KEN | MEM; 13 | GRE; 25 | SNM; 16 | SBO; 14 | MYB; 16 | BRI; DNQ | MOT; 13 | ATL | 18th | 972 | |
| 2003 | Callihan Motorsports | 48 | Pontiac | DAY; 25 | OGL | CLT; 15 | SBO | GRE | KEN; 29 | BRI | ATL | | | | | | | 34th | 282 | |
