= Kings Mountain Mine =

Lithium mine in North Carolina

- Interactive map of Kings Mountain Mine
- Location: Kings Mountain, North Carolina, United States; 35°13′17.40″N 81°21′0.06″W
- Products: Lithium

The Kings Mountain Mine is a large open-pit mine on the south side of the eponymous town of Kings Mountain and north of Interstate 85 in Cleveland County, North Carolina. Its open-pit has been excavated in one of the largest bedrock lithium deposits in the United States. In 2013, it was reported that the Kings Mountain mine had reserves amounting to 45.6 million tonnes of lithium ore grading 0.7% lithium thus resulting 0.32 million tonnes of lithium. In 2017 it was reported that the Kings Mountain pegmatite district had 5.9 million metric tons of lithium.

== History of mining operations ==
The first mining operations in the Kings Mountain area was for gold, which started after it was discovered in the area after 1834. The Kings Mountain Gold Mine operated intermittently until was closed in the early 1900s. In 1880, prospectors discovered cassiterite, tin ore, in the pegmatites within a 20 mi (32 km) wide, 110 mi (180 km) long, north-south trending zone of bedrock that became known as the Carolina tin belt and later the King Mountain belt. In addition to gold, minor quantities of gem spodumene were mined as early as 1880. The Carolina tin belt became known as the tin-spodumene belt after L.M. Williams found large spodumene deposits in it in 1935. The mining of cassiterite proved uneconomic and was replaced by the production of spodumene as a source of lithium.

During World War II, Solvay Process Company operated from May 1942 to February 1945 a flotation plant for production of spodumene concentrate from ore excavated from the Kings Mountain Mine. The operation had a daily capacity of 300 short tons (270 long tons) of ore and the production of ore during this period was less than 15,000 short tons (13,000 long tons). The Kings Mountain Mine and associated ore processing plants shut down with the reduction of wartime demand for lithium chemicals, including high temperature engine grease and resulting cancelation of government contracts. Foote Mineral Company acquired the Solvay plant in 1950.

In the fall of 1950, Foote Mineral Company acquired the Kings Mountain Mine and ore mill. The mine and mill were renovated. The production of concentrates started July 29, 1951. Because the recovery of lithium carbonate from hard rock mining operations was uneconomic when compared with less labor- and energy-intensive recovery of brine technology, Foote Mineral Company closed its Kings Mountain Mine and let it flood in 1996.

In 1996 Cyprus Amax acquired Foote Mineral Company and along with it the Kings Mountain Mine. In 1998, Cyprus Amax sold both to Chemetall GmbH, a subsidiary of Metallgesellschaft, which is part of the Dynamit Nobel Group. Later, in 2012, Rockwood Lithium acquired the Kings Mountain Mine. In 2015, Rockwood Lithium sold it to its present owner, the Albemarle Corporation, who currently is actively working on reopening it and resuming mining.

== Geology ==
At the Kings Mountain Mine, the lithium ore consists of spodumene pegmatite dikes. Spodumene is a mineral, a lithium aluminum inosilicate, that is an important ore of lithium. At this mine, the generally homogeneous, spodumene pegmatite dikes consist by weight of 20% spodumene, 32% quartz, 27% albite, 14% microcline, 6% muscovite, and 1% trace minerals. Trace minerals include beryl (0.4%), manganapatite, zircon, ferrocolumbite, and cassiterite. Within these pegmatite dikes, both the spodumene and microcline occur as crystals less than 12-inch (30 cm) long along with books of muscovite generally less than 1-inch (2.5 cm) long within a matrix of fine- to medium-grained quartz and albite. The Rb-Sr whole-rock dating of the pegmatite yielded a Mississippian emplacement age of 340 ± 5 Ma.

At the King Mountain Mine, spodumene pegmatite dikes occur within a 2.8-mile (4.5 km) long and 0.25-mile (0.40 km) wide northeast-southwest trending sliver of Cambrian or Neoproterozoic amphibolite. This amphibolite sliver is surrounded by Cherryville Granite, except on its southeast side where it lies against a fault of the King Mountain shear zone. The fault separates the amphibolite and the Mississippian Cherryville Granite on its northwest side from Neoproterozoic phyllitic metasiltstone schist of the Blacksburg Formation on the fault's southeast side. The phyllitic schist consists of muscovite, biotite, plagioclase, and quartz, with accessory garnet, staurolite, andalusite, tourmaline, and chlorite.

The amphibolite sliver is composed of dark gray to greenish black, fine grained, and thinly layered amphibolite. This amphibolite consists of green hornblende, plagioclase, and quartz with small amounts of sphene, epidote, and other accessory minerals The amphibolite contains layers of talc-silicate minerals and calcite as well as chloritic biotite schist. The spodumene pegmatite dikes cut irregularly and discordantly through the amphibolite. Commonly, the amphibolite adjacent to these dikes is brecciated and altered to biotite schist within 24-inch (61 cm) of them. This alteration zone also contains abundant holmquistite, a lithium amphibole, adjacent to the pegmatite dikes.

This spodumene pegamatite-bearing amphibolite sliver is part of a narrow, northeast-southeast elongate zone that contains similar spodumene pegamatite-bearing amphibolite deposits. This zone, known as the Kings Mountain belt, is conservatively at least 25 mi (40 km) long and 0.6 to 2 mi (0.97 to 3.22 km) wide, extending from the South Carolina-North Carolina state line near Grover, North Carolina to a few miles (kilometers) east of Lincolnton, North Carolina. The Kings Mountain belt lies along the eastern edge of Inner Piedmont belt and adjacent to Kings Mountain shear zone.

== Mineralogy ==
Among mineralogists and mineral collectors, the Kings Mountain Mine, a.k.a. Foote Mine, is well known for the variety and quality of mineral specimens that have been collected from it. As reported by Marble and Hanahan and White, about 100 different minerals have been found and reported from the Kings Mountain Mine. At the contact between the spondumene pegmatite dikes and amphibolite, the reported metamrophic and hydrothrmal minerals include albite, biotite, epidote-clinozoisite, ferroaxinite, garnet (spessartine-grossular), holmquistite, pyrrhotite, quartz, and tourmaline (schorl). The secondary hydrothermal minerals found in joints and vugs include apatite, bavenite, bertrandite, bikitaite, brannockite, eakerite, eosphorite, eucryptite, fairfieldite, lithiophilite, lithiophosphate, milarite, roscherite, rhodochrosite-siderite, swinefordite, switzerite, tetrawickmanite, tin-bearing titanite, and vivianite. The reported supergene minerals include birnessite, cryptomelane, gypsum, and hydrated phosphates of manganese and iron. In addition, Earth scientist have reported more than 30 phosphate minerals from the Kings Mountain Mine. Three phosphate minerals (switzerite, kingsmountite, and an unnamed triclinic analog of roscherite) and three tin minerals (brannockite, eakerite, and tetrawickmanite were first recognized and described from this mine.
