= Gary Webb (racing driver) =

American racing driver

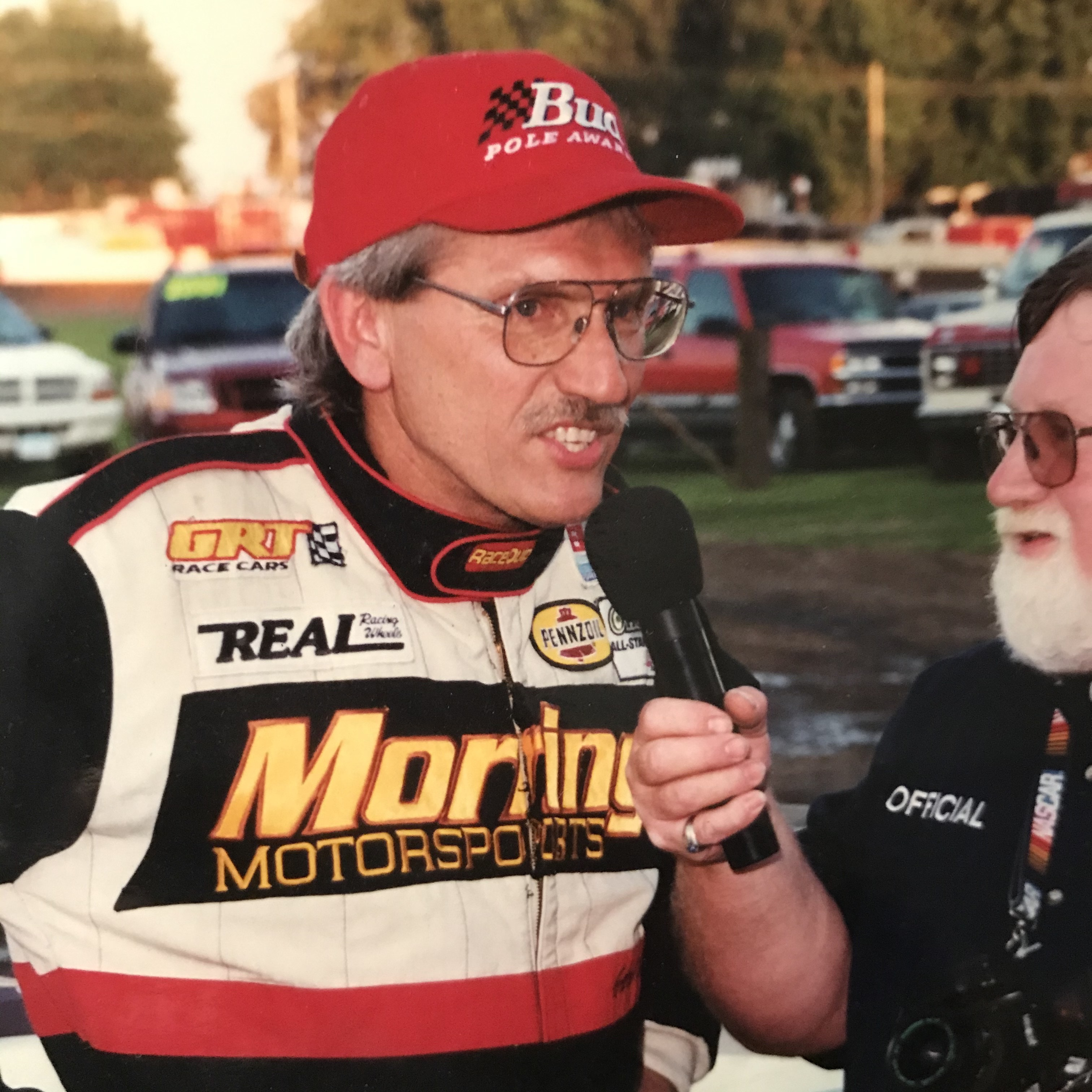
- Webb in 2000
- Born: April 19, 1949 (age 77) Davenport, Iowa, U.S.

Championship titles
- 2000 NASCAR Weekly Racing Series national champion

Gary Webb (born April 19, 1949) is an American racing driver from Blue Grass, Iowa who won the NASCAR Weekly Racing Series national championship in 2000. He received a $150,000 bonus.

Webb began racing in 1972 in a late model. He had 201 features wins between 1980 and 1989. He won the 1984 and 1985 UMP national championships.

Driving a dirt late model for owner Larry Moring (sponsor of Tom Hearst's team which won the 1982 title) and another dirt Late Model of his own, Webb won 22 of the 54 NASCAR-sanctioned races that he entered at Dubuque Fairgrounds Speedway and Farley Speedway, both in Iowa. His record of 16 wins in 18 starts at the 3/8 mile track at Dubuque won the national title and the Mid American division.

Webb finished second in the 2001 national championship points. He was the series' Most Popular Driver that year.

== Honors ==
- As part of the 25th anniversary of the NASCAR Weekly Series in 2006, Webb was named one of the series' All Time Top 25 drivers. Webb has a total of 518 career feature wins under his belt, from 63 different tracks across the United States. In 2008, Webb was inducted into the National Dirt Late Model Hall of Fame in Florence, Kentucky.
