= Scott Weaver (racing driver) =

American racing driver (born 1968)

- Nationality: American
- Born: September 20, 1968 (age 58) Shelby, North Carolina, U.S.

NASCAR Goody's Dash Series career
- Debut season: 1985
- Years active: 1985–2003
- Starts: 284
- Championships: 0
- Wins: 3
- Poles: 4
- Best finish: 6th in 1991, 2002
- Statistics up to date as of December 19, 2024.

Scott Weaver (born September 20, 1968) is an American former professional stock car racing driver who competed in the NASCAR Goody's Dash Series from 1985 to 2003.

Weaver has previously competed in the X-1R Pro Cup Series and the UARA STARS Late Model Series, as well as the later incarnations of the Dash Series, such as the IPOWER Dash Series and the ISCARS Dash Series.

== Motorsports results ==
=== NASCAR ===
(key) (Bold – Pole position awarded by qualifying time. Italics – Pole position earned by points standings or practice time. * – Most laps led.)

==== Goody's Dash Series ====
NASCAR Goody's Dash Series results
Year	Team	No.	Make	1	2	3	4	5	6	7	8	9	10	11	12	13	14	15	16	17	18	19	20	21	NGDS	Pts	Ref
1985	Weaver Racing	2	Chevy	DAY; 31	LAN	GRE; 16	CLT; 35	ODS; 20	LAN	BIR; 29	MMS	ROU	SBO; 15	STH	ODS	HCY	CLT; 28								33rd	319	
1986	Weaver Racing	2	Chevy	DAY; 41	HCY; 9	LAN; 16	ASH; 14	FCS; 15	ROU; 14	CLT; 30	POC; 21	STH; 15	LAN; 15	SBO; 14	BRI; 9	HCY	SBO; N/A^{†}	HCY; 15	CLT; 34	NWS; 10					17th	1747	
1987	Weaver Racing	2	Chevy	DAY; 42	ASH; 9	CLT; 28	STH	NWS; 7	HCY; 11	BRI; 5	SUM; N/A^{†}	LAN; N/A^{†}	SBO; 13	LAN; 2	CLT; 30	HCY; 12									12th	1444	
1988	Weaver Racing	2	Chevy	DAY; 8	ROU; 24	HCY; 20	MYB; 7	CLT; 22	ASH; 6	NSV; 8	SUM; 18	STH; 11	LAN; 6	AND; 13	MYB; 21	LAN; 14	HCY; 11	CLT; 22							9th	1832	
1989	Weaver Racing	2	Pontiac	DAY; 26										AND; 9			HCY; 5	LAN; N/A^{†}							10th	1775	
1989	Weaver Racing	2	Chevy		FLO; 19	NRV; 13	HCY; N/A^{†}	CON; 23	LAN; 13	SBO; N/A^{†}	NSV; 15	SUM; N/A^{†}	LAN; 18		BGS; 10	MYB; 19									10th	1775	
1990	Weaver Racing	2	Pontiac	DAY; 23	NRV; 5	AND; 15	LAN; 5					BGS; 16	HCY; 13	CON; 14		MYB; 25	ACE; 22		HCY; 9						11th	2007	
1990	Weaver Racing	2	Chevy					FLO; 8	STH; 12	SUM; 5	LAN; 15				TRI; 15			LAN; 8							11th	2007	
1991	Weaver Racing	2	Chevy	DAY; 27	FIF; 2	NRV; 3	BGS; 15	FLO; 8	LAN; 20	SUM; 4	STH; 2	LAN; 4*	BGS; 8	HCY; 20	MYB; 24	ACE; 12	HCY; 3	SHO; 5	NSV; 5						6th	2208	
1992	Weaver Racing	2	Chevy	DAY; 15	HCY; 22	LON; 20	FLO; 6	LAN; 12	SUM; 15	STH; 4	BGS; 9	MYB; 16	NRV; 10	SUM; 17	ACE; 20	HCY; 7	VOL; 7								10th	1767	
1993	Weaver Racing	2	Chevy	DAY; 5	NSV; 13	SUM; 13	VOL; 4	MAR; 12	LON; 12	411; 11	LAN; 7	HCY; 18	SUM; N/A^{†}	FLO; 5	BGS; 10	MYB; 22	NRV; 17	HCY; 20	VOL; 13						9th	2043	
1994	Weaver Racing	2	Chevy	DAY; 21	VOL; 6	FLO; 20	SUM; 21	CAR; 20	411; 15	HCY; 22	LAN; 4	BRI; 5	SUM	FLO; 17	BGS; 7	MYB; 24	NRV; 27	ASH; 19	VOL; 3	HCY; 14					12th	1909	
1995	Weaver Racing	2	Pontiac	DAY; 31	FLO; 11		MYB; 15	SUM; 10	HCY; 22	CAR; 7	STH; 12	BRI; 14				MYB; 14									14th	1977	
1995	N/A	14	Chevy			LAN; 21																			14th	1977	
1995	Weaver Racing	2	Chevy										SUM; 9	GRE; 18			NSV; 16	FLO; 15	NWS; 25	VOL	HCY; 20	HOM			14th	1977	
1995	N/A	0	Chevy												BGS; 8										14th	1977	
1996	Weaver Racing	2	Pontiac	DAY; 5	HOM; 16	MYB; 22	SUM; 12	NSV; 14	TRI; 25	CAR; 13	HCY; 27	FLO; 6	BRI; 18	SUM; 9	GRE; 6	SNM; 17	BGS; 10	MYB; 19	LAN; 16	STH; 13	FLO; 20	NWS; 32		HCY; 19	10th	2423	
1996	Weaver Racing	2	Chevy																				VOL; 21		10th	2423	
1997	Weaver Racing	2	Pontiac	DAY; 16	HOM; 28	KIN; 25	MYB; 16	LAN; 5	CAR; 19	TRI; 15	FLO; 19	HCY; 5	BRI; 25	**GRE**; 15	SNM; 1*	CLT; 31	MYB; 27	LAN; 22	SUM; 19	STA; 14	HCY; 26	USA; 28	CON; 24	HOM; 9	13th	2292	
1998	Weaver Racing	2	Pontiac	DAY; 32	HCY; 22	CAR; 9	CLT; 27	TRI; 17	LAN; 15	BRI; 30	SUM; 26	GRE; 23	ROU; 10	SNM; 3	MYB; 3	CON; 17	HCY; 21	LAN; 6	STA; 5	LOU; 15	VOL; 5	USA; 7			9th	2408	
1998	Weaver Racing	0	Pontiac																				HOM; 8		9th	2408	
1999	Weaver Racing	2	Pontiac	**DAY**; 36	HCY	CAR	CLT	BRI	LOU	SUM	GRE	ROU	STA	MYB	HCY	LAN	USA; 17	JAC; 21	LAN; 6						41st	417	
2000	Weaver Racing	2	Pontiac	DAY; 20	MON; 26	STA; 5	JAC; 24	CAR; 1	CLT; 3	SBO; 7	ROU; 14	LOU; 15	SUM; 20	GRE; 28			BRI; 25	HCY; 9	JAC; 23	**USA**; 22	LAN; 14				12th	2120	
2000	Weaver Racing	2	Chevy												SNM; 8	MYB; 23									12th	2120	
2001	Weaver Racing	2	Pontiac	DAY; 4	ROU; 4	DAR; 27	CLT; 20	LOU; 12	JAC; 14		SBO; 16	DAY; 21	GRE; 13	SNM; 8	NRV; 4	MYB; 12	BRI; 11	ACE; 14	JAC; 4	USA; 7	NSH; 6				7th	2313	
2001	Weaver Racing	12	Pontiac							KEN; 26															7th	2313	
2002	Weaver Racing	2	Pontiac	DAY; 31	**HAR**; 8	ROU; 27	LON; 12	CLT; 7	KEN; 12	MEM; 3	GRE; 2	SNM; 10	SBO; 6	**MYB**; 5	BRI; 1	MOT; 5	ATL; 8								6th	1945	
2003	Weaver Racing	2	Pontiac	DAY; 40	OGL; 9	CLT; 24	SBO; 7	GRE; 18	KEN; 6	BRI; 4	ATL; 24														10th	927	
^{†} - Results/participation unknown
