= Joe Kosiski =

American racing driver

- Born: August 27, 1957 (age 69) Omaha, Nebraska, U.S.
- Relatives: Bob Kosiski; Steve Kosiski; Ed Kosiski

NASCAR O'Reilly All-Star Series
- Years active: 1985–2001
- Starts: 259
- Wins: 46
- Best finish: 1st in 1986, 1988, 1989, 1996, 1997

Championship titles
- 1986 1986, 1988, 1989, 1996, 1997: NASCAR Weekly Series; Busch All-Star Tour

NASCAR O'Reilly Auto Parts Series career
- Best finish: ? (1986)
Wins	Top tens	Poles
0	0	0

Joe Kosiski (born August 27, 1957) is an American racing driver. A five-time champion in the NASCAR Busch All-Star Tour, he also won the 1986 NASCAR Winston Racing Series championship, four NASCAR regional championships, and has been inducted into multiple racing Halls of Fame.

== Career ==
Son of Daytona 500 competitor Bob Kosiski and older brother of championship-winning racers Steve Kosiski and Ed Kosiski, Joe Kosiski won the NASCAR Weekly Series national championship in 1986. Driving a family-owned dirt Late Model, Kosiski won 29 of the 55 NASCAR-sanctioned races that he entered in Nebraska, Kansas, Missouri, and elsewhere in the Midwestern United States.

Kosiski attempted one NASCAR Busch Series event, in 1986 but failed to qualify. He competed in seven events in the ARCA Permatex Supercar Series in 1989 and 1990, posting a best finish of ninth at Atlanta Motor Speedway.

Kosiski also won the NASCAR Busch All-Star Tour series championship in 1986, 1988, 1989, 1996 and 1997. Owner of Kosiski Auto Parts in Omaha, Nebraska, he was the track operator at I-80 Speedway, which closed after the 2022 season. He won twenty-one track championships during his career, nine of them coming at Sunset Speedway; in addition to his 1986 national Winston Racing Series title, Kosiski won four NASCAR regional championships during his career.

As part of the 25th anniversary of the NASCAR Weekly Series in 2006, Kosiski was named one of the series' All Time Top 25 drivers. He was inducted in the National Dirt Late Model Hall of Fame in 2008, In 2002, Kosiski stated that he had competed in races in 34 states, winning in 28 of them. and in 2013 was inducted into the Nebraska Auto Racing Hall of Fame. Joe and Steve Kosiski were the first brothers to win NASCAR touring series championships.

== Motorsports career results ==
=== NASCAR ===
(key) (Bold – Pole position awarded by qualifying time. Italics – Pole position earned by points standings or practice time. * – Most laps led.)

==== Busch Series ====
NASCAR Busch Grand National Series results
Year	Team	No.	Make	1	2	3	4	5	6	7	8	9	10	11	12	13	14	15	16	17	18	19	20	21	22	23	24	25	26	27	28	29	30	31	NBGNSC	Pts
1986	Randy Hope Motorsports	38	Buick	DAY	CAR	HCY	MAR	BRI	DAR	SBO	LGY	JFC	DOV	CLT	SBO	HCY	ROU	IRP	SBO	RAL	OXF	SBO	HCY	LGY	ROU	BRI	DAR	RCH	DOV	MAR	ROU	CLT	CAR	MAR; DNQ	N/A	-

Sporting positions
Preceded by Roger Dolan; Steve Kosiski; Steve Kosiski	NASCAR Busch All-Star Tour Champion; 1986; 1988, 1989; 1996, 1997	Succeeded by Steve Kosiski; Steve Kosiski; Steve Kosiski
