= Danny Bagwell =

American racing driver (born 1960)

- Born: October 12, 1960 (age 66); Cordova, Alabama, U.S.

NASCAR FedEx Freight Truck Series career
- 3 races run over 4 years
- Best finish: 56th (1998)
- First race: 1998 Memphis 200 (Memphis)
- Last race: 1999 Coca-Cola Family 200 (Bristol)
Wins	Top tens	Poles
0	0	0
- Statistics up to date as of December 10, 2024.

Danny Bagwell (born October 12, 1960) is an American former professional stock car racing driver who has competed in the NASCAR Craftsman Truck Series and the NASCAR Goody's Dash Series.

Bagwell is best known for suffering a violent crash during the Goody's Dash race at Daytona International Speedway in 1999, where he hit the outside wall at the fourth corner and entered into a series of barrel rolls, leaving only the roll cage intact; he would escape the crash without serious injuries.

Bagwell has also previously competed in series such as the IPOWER Dash Series, the ISCARS Dash Series, where he run the championship in 2007, 2008, 2010, and the final season in 2011, the Southern All Star Super Late Model Series, and the Sunoco Gulf Coast Championship Series.

== Motorsports results ==
=== NASCAR ===
(key) (Bold - Pole position awarded by qualifying time. Italics - Pole position earned by points standings or practice time. * – Most laps led.)

==== Busch Series ====
NASCAR Busch Series results
Year	Team	No.	Make	1	2	3	4	5	6	7	8	9	10	11	12	13	14	15	16	17	18	19	20	21	22	23	24	25	26	27	28	29	30	31	32	33	NBSC	Pts	Ref
2001	George White	22	Chevy	DAY	CAR	LVS	ATL	DAR	BRI	TEX	NSH	TAL	CAL	RCH	NHA	NZH	CLT	DOV	KEN	MLW	GLN	CHI	GTY	PPR	IRP	MCH	BRI	DAR	RCH	DOV	KAN	CLT	MEM	PHO	CAR	HOM; DNQ	N/A	0	

==== Craftsman Truck Series ====
NASCAR Craftsman Truck Series results
Year	Team	No.	Make	1	2	3	4	5	6	7	8	9	10	11	12	13	14	15	16	17	18	19	20	21	22	23	24	25	26	27	NCTC	Pts	Ref
1998	Four Tech Racing	28	Ford	WDW; DNQ	HOM	PHO	POR	EVG	I70	GLN	TEX	BRI; DNQ	MLW; DNQ	NZH	CAL	PPR	IRP	NHA	FLM	NSV	HPT	LVL	RCH	MEM; 31	GTY; 31	MAR	SON	MMR	PHO	LVS; DNQ	56th	258	
1999	Four Tech Racing	28	Ford	HOM	PHO	EVG	MMR	MAR	MEM	PPR	I70	BRI; 30	TEX	PIR	GLN	MLW	NSV	NZH	MCH	NHA	IRP	GTY	HPT	RCH	LVS	LVL	TEX	CAL			108th	73	
2003	Four Tech Racing	81	Ford	DAY	DAR	MMR	MAR	CLT	DOV	TEX	MEM	MLW	KAN	KEN	GTW	MCH	IRP	NSH	BRI	RCH	NHA	CAL	LVS	SBO	TEX	MAR	PHO	HOM; DNQ			N/A	0	
2004	Four Tech Racing	41	Ford	DAY	ATL	MAR	MFD	CLT	DOV	TEX	MEM	MLW	KAN	KEN	GTW	MCH	IRP	NSH	BRI	RCH	NHA	LVS	CAL	TEX	MAR	PHO; DNQ	DAR; DNQ	HOM; DNQ			N/A	0	

==== Goody's Dash Series ====
NASCAR Goody's Dash Series results
Year	Team	No.	Make	1	2	3	4	5	6	7	8	9	10	11	12	13	14	15	16	17	18	19	20	21	NGDS	Pts	Ref
1991	Bagwell Racing	10	Ford	DAY	FIF	NRV	BGS; 5	FLO	LAN; 11	SUM	STH	LAN	BGS	HCY	MYB; 5	ACE	HCY	SHO	NSV; 21						25th	540	
1992	Bagwell Racing	10	Ford	DAY; 41	HCY; 7	LON; 7	FLO; 7	LAN; 3	SUM; 6	STH; 2	BGS; 1	MYB; 2	NRV; 2	SUM; 3	ACE; 6	HCY; 23	VOL; 5								6th	2047	
1993	Bagwell Racing	10	Ford	DAY; 24	NSV; 16	SUM; 2	VOL; 12	MAR; 14	LON; 5	411; 5	LAN; 5	HCY; 5	SUM; N/A^{†}	FLO; 13	BGS	MYB; 15	NRV; 19	HCY; 13	VOL; 2						10th	1963	
1994	Bagwell Racing	10	Ford	DAY; 20	VOL; N/A^{†}	FLO; 6	SUM; 25	CAR; 25	411; N/A^{†}	HCY; 2	LAN; 18	BRI; 8	SUM; 7	FLO; 5	BGS; 3	MYB; 3	NRV; 16	ASH; 2	VOL; 22	HCY; 22					7th	2178	
1995	Bagwell Racing	10	Ford	DAY; 28	FLO; 24	LAN; 1*	**MYB**; 30	SUM; 3	HCY; 10	CAR; 26	STH; 5	BRI; 7	SUM; 5	GRE; 1*	BGS; 2	MYB; 21	NSV; 2	FLO; 5		VOL; 20	HCY; 3	**HOM**; 11			6th	2570	
1995	N/A	3	Pontiac																NWS; 10						6th	2570	
1996	Four Tech Racing	10	Ford	DAY; 20	HOM; 8	MYB; 3	SUM; 4	NSV; 2	TRI; 5	CAR; 24	HCY; 3	FLO; 2	BRI; 7	SUM; 5	GRE; 15	SNM; 2	BGS; 4	MYB; 28	LAN; 4	STH; 1	FLO; 4	NWS; 26	VOL; 6	HCY; 4	4th	3044	
1997	Four Tech Racing	10	Ford	DAY; 34	HOM; 15	KIN; 14	MYB	LAN	CAR	TRI	FLO	HCY	BRI	GRE	SNM						HCY; 27		**CON**; 25	HOM; 1	27th	935	
1997	N/A	91	Ford													CLT; 11	MYB	LAN	SUM	STA					27th	935	
1997	N/A	30	Pontiac																			USA; 18			27th	935	
1998	Four Tech Racing	10	Ford	DAY; 5	HCY	CAR	CLT; 19	TRI	LAN	BRI	SUM	GRE	ROU	SNM; 18	MYB	CON	HCY	LAN	STA	LOU	VOL; 20	USA; 3	HOM; 2		28th	808	
1999	Four Tech Racing	10	Ford	DAY; 16	HCY	CAR												JAC; 25	LAN						33rd	573	
1999	N/A	28	Ford				CLT; 5	BRI	LOU	SUM	GRE	ROU	STA	MYB	HCY	LAN									33rd	573	
1999	Four Tech Racing	10	Pontiac														USA; 4								33rd	573	
2000	Four Tech Racing	10	Pontiac	DAY	MON; 27	STA; 23	JAC; 3	CAR; 26	CLT; 2	SBO; 20						MYB; 29	BRI; 11	HCY	JAC; 10	USA; 34	LAN; 24				23rd	1356	
2000	N/A	7	Pontiac								ROU; 25	LOU	SUM	GRE	SNM										23rd	1356	
2001	Four Tech Racing	10	Mercury	DAY; 24	ROU; 24	DAR; 11	CLT; 13	LOU; 19	JAC	KEN; 11	SBO	DAY; 2	GRE; 4	SNM; 7	NRV; 8	MYB; 23	BRI; 24	ACE; 19		USA; 21	NSH; 11				14th	1920	
2001	N/A	77	Toyota																JAC; 18						14th	1920	
2002	Four Tech Racing	10	Mercury	DAY; 37	HAR; 4	ROU; 10	LON; 2	CLT; 4	KEN; 22	MEM; 1	GRE; 3	SNM; 9	SBO; 28	MYB; 9	BRI; 14	MOT; 8	ATL; 5								7th	1891	
2003	Four Tech Racing	10	Mercury	DAY; 20	OGL; 1	CLT; 34	SBO; 5	GRE; 20		BRI; 22	ATL; 3														6th	1029	
2003	Four Tech Racing	10	Ford						KEN; 3																6th	1029	
^{†} - Results/participation unknown

Sporting positions
Preceded by Eric Wilson	ISCARS Dash Touring Champion; 2007	Succeeded by Danny Bagwell
Preceded by Danny Bagwell	ISCARS Dash Touring Champion; 2008	Succeeded by Jason Shultz
Preceded by Jason Shultz	ISCARS Dash Touring Champion; 2010	Succeeded by Danny Bagwell
Preceded by Danny Bagwell	ISCARS Dash Touring Champion; 2011	Succeeded by none
