= Watt (surname) =

Origin
- Meaning: Old High German walt ("power")

Watt is a Scottish surname, deriving from the Old High German word walt, meaning "power". The watt unit of power is named in honor of James Watt (1736–1819), an 18th-century Scottish engineer whose invention of the Watt steam engine in 1776 was the driving force of the Industrial Revolution.

== People with the surname ==
- Adam Watt, Australian boxer
- Alan Watt (diplomat) (1901–1988), Australian diplomat
- Alexander Watt, British plant ecologist
- Allan Watt, Scottish sprinter
- Andrew Watt (record producer) (born 1990), American record producer, singer
- Ben Watt, British musician and music producer
- Chris Watt, American football player
- Davey Watt, Australian speedway rider
- David Watt (computer scientist), British computer scientist
- Derek Watt, American football player
- Douglas Watt (politician), Canadian politician
- Duncan Watt (1942-2017), Singaporean news presenter, radio announcer and writer
- Eddie Watt, Major League Baseball pitcher
- Fiona Watt (author), British children's author
- Francis Watt (disambiguation), various people
- Geoff Watt, Australian runner
- George Watt (disambiguation), multiple people
- Hamish Watt, Scottish politician
- Ian Watt, literary historian
- James Watt (1736–1819), Scottish engineer
- James Watt Jr., English manufacturer, son of James
- James G. Watt, US Secretary of the Interior
- Jim Watt (boxer), Scottish boxer
- Joachim von Watt (1484–1551), birth name of Swiss scholar Joachim Vadian
- John Brown Watt, Australian politician
- Jonathan Watt, English cricketer
- Joseph Watt, Scottish VC recipient
- Joseph M. Watt, American judge
- J. J. Watt, American football player
- Katherine Christie Watt, Scottish nurse and civil servant
- Kathy Watt, Australian cyclist
- Leslie Watt, New Zealand cricketer
- Mel Watt, American politician
- Michael Watt (disambiguation), multiple people
- Mike Watt, American musician
- Mike Watt (disambiguation), multiple people
- Mitchell Watt, Australian track and field athlete
- Mitchell Watt (basketball), American basketball player
- Muriel Watt (1917 - 2005), New Zealand landscape architect
- Nicole Watt, Canadian skater
- Phil Watt, English footballer
- Richard Harding Watt, designer of buildings in Knutsford, Cheshire
- Robert Watt (disambiguation), various people
- Sanchez Watt, English footballer
- Sarah Watt (1958–2011), Australian film director
- Steven Watt (footballer), footballer
- T. J. Watt, American football player
- Tom Watt (ice hockey), Canadian hockey coach
- Tom Watt (actor), British actor, journalist and radio DJ
- Tommy Watt (1925–2006), Scottish bandleader
- Tony Watt, Scottish footballer
- William Watt (disambiguation), multiple people

== See also ==
- Von Watt family, a merchant family of St. Gallen
- Watt (disambiguation)
- Watts (surname)
- James Watt (disambiguation)
