= Michael Watts =

Michael or Mike Watts may refer to:

- Michael Watts (geographer) (born 1951), English geographer and professor at the University of California, Berkeley
- Michael Watts (journalist) (1938–2018), British journalist
- Mike Watts (record producer), American record producer and audio engineer
- Mike Watts (sportscaster) (born 1993), American television sports commentator
- Mike Watts (racing driver), American stock car racing driver
- Michael "5000" Watts, American DJ and founder of the record label Swishahouse
- Michael Watts, American journalist for Melody Maker magazine

== See also ==
- Michael Watt (disambiguation)
