= Alan Watt =

Alan Watt may refer to:

- Alan Watt (diplomat) (1901–1988), Australian diplomat
- Alan Watt (cricketer) (1907–1974), English cricketer
- Alan Watt (rugby union) (born 1967), Scotland rugby union player
- Allan Watt (1922–2014), Scottish sprinter

== See also ==
- Alan Watts (1915–1973), British philosopher
