= Reece Milton =

American racing driver

- Nationality: American
- Born: July 23, 1969 (age 57) Sevierville, Tennessee, U.S.

NASCAR Goody's Dash Series career
- Debut season: 2002
- Years active: 2002–2003
- Starts: 11
- Championships: 0
- Wins: 0
- Poles: 0
- Best finish: 21st in 2002
- Statistics up to date as of December 23, 2024.

Reece Milton (born July 23, 1969) is an American former professional stock car racing driver who competed in the NASCAR Goody's Dash Series from 2002 to 2003.

Milton has previously competed in the IPOWER Dash Series and the ARA Late Model Stock All-Star Tour.

== Motorsports results ==
=== NASCAR ===
(key) (Bold – Pole position awarded by qualifying time. Italics – Pole position earned by points standings or practice time. * – Most laps led.)

==== Goody's Dash Series ====
NASCAR Goody's Dash Series results
Year	Team	No.	Make	1	2	3	4	5	6	7	8	9	10	11	12	13	14	NGDS	Pts	Ref
2002	Ferguson Enterprises	75	Toyota	DAY	HAR; 22	ROU; 18	LON; 17	CLT	KEN	MEM; 14	GRE	SNM	SBO; 18	MYB	BRI; 7	MOT; 19	ATL	21st	800	
2003	Ferguson Enterprises	75	Toyota	DAY; 30	OGL	CLT; DNQ	SBO; 12	GRE; 8	KEN	BRI; 30	ATL							26th	446	
