= T. J. Majors =

American racing driver & spotter (born 1979)

- Nationality: American
- Born: Travis J. Majors; November 30, 1979 (age 46) East Bethany, New York, U.S.

NASCAR Goody's Dash Series career
- Debut season: 2003
- Years active: 2003
- Starts: 8
- Championships: 0
- Wins: 0
- Poles: 0
- Best finish: 9th in 2003
- Statistics up to date as of December 11, 2024.

Travis J. "T. J." Majors (born November 30, 1979) is an American former professional stock car racing driver and spotter who currently serves as the spotter for the No. 42 Toyota Camry XSE for Josh Berry and Legacy Motor Club in the NASCAR Cup Series. He has previously worked for teams such as RFK Racing, JR Motorsports, Hendrick Motorsports, Team Penske, and Brandonbilt Motorsports, where he also served as a spotter.

Majors has previously competed in the now defunct NASCAR Goody's Dash Series for one season in 2003, where he finished ninth in the points with three top-ten finishes.

== In other media ==
Majors is the spotter for NASCAR 25, where he also appears as a podcast guest for Dale Jr.'s Download podcast.

== Motorsports results ==
=== NASCAR ===
(key) (Bold – Pole position awarded by qualifying time. Italics – Pole position earned by points standings or practice time. * – Most laps led.)

==== Goody's Dash Series ====
NASCAR Goody's Dash Series results
Year	Team	No.	Make	1	2	3	4	5	6	7	8	NGDS	Pts	Ref
2003	N/A	26	Pontiac	DAY; 24	OGL; 8	CLT; 10	SBO; 6	GRE; 12	KEN; 18	BRI; 31	ATL; 13	9th	947	
