= 2014 Toyota Owners 400 =

Race details
- Race 9 of 36 in the 2014 NASCAR Sprint Cup Series
- Date: April 26, 2014
- Location: Richmond International Raceway in Richmond, Virginia
- Course: Permanent racing facility
- Course length: 0.75 miles (1.2 km)
- Distance: 400 laps, 300 mi (482.803 km)
- Weather: Sunny, 78 °F (26 °C), 13 mph (21 km/h) winds WSW
- Average speed: 93.369 mph (150.263 km/h)

Pole position
Driver	Kyle Larson	Chip Ganassi Racing
- Time: 21.280 (set by first practice)

Most laps led
Driver	Jeff Gordon	Hendrick Motorsports
- Laps: 173

Winner
No. 22	Joey Logano	Team Penske

Television in the United States
- Network: Fox & MRN
- Announcers: Mike Joy, Darrell Waltrip and Larry McReynolds (Television); Joe Moore and Jeff Striegle (Booth); Mike Bagley (Backstretch) (Radio)
- Nielsen ratings: 3.3/7 (Final); 3.0/7 (Overnight); 5.573 Million viewers

The 2014 Toyota Owners 400 was a NASCAR Sprint Cup Series stock car race held on April 26, 2014, at Richmond International Raceway in Richmond, Virginia. Contested over 400 laps on the 0.75 miles (1.21 km) D-shaped short track, it was the ninth race of the 2014 Sprint Cup Series championship. Joey Logano recorded his fifth career win in this race. Jeff Gordon finished second, while Kyle Busch, Brad Keselowski, and Matt Kenseth rounded out the top five. The top rookies of the race were Kyle Larson (16th), Justin Allgaier (21st), and Austin Dillon (27th).

== Report ==
=== Entry list ===
The entry list for the Toyota Owners 400 was released on Thursday, April 24, 2014 at 4:16 p.m. Eastern time. Forty-five drivers were entered for the race.

No.	Driver	Team	Manufacturer
1	Jamie McMurray	Chip Ganassi Racing	Chevrolet
2	Brad Keselowski (PC2)	Team Penske	Ford
3	Austin Dillon (R)	Richard Childress Racing	Chevrolet
4	Kevin Harvick	Stewart–Haas Racing	Chevrolet
5	Kasey Kahne	Hendrick Motorsports	Chevrolet
7	Michael Annett (R)	Tommy Baldwin Racing	Chevrolet
9	Marcos Ambrose	Richard Petty Motorsports	Ford
10	Danica Patrick	Stewart–Haas Racing	Chevrolet
11	Denny Hamlin	Joe Gibbs Racing	Toyota
13	Casey Mears	Germain Racing	Chevrolet
14	Tony Stewart (PC3)	Stewart–Haas Racing	Chevrolet
15	Clint Bowyer	Michael Waltrip Racing	Toyota
16	Greg Biffle	Roush Fenway Racing	Ford
17	Ricky Stenhouse Jr.	Roush Fenway Racing	Ford
18	Kyle Busch	Joe Gibbs Racing	Toyota
20	Matt Kenseth (PC5)	Joe Gibbs Racing	Toyota
22	Joey Logano	Team Penske	Ford
23	Alex Bowman (R)	BK Racing	Toyota
24	Jeff Gordon (PC6)	Hendrick Motorsports	Chevrolet
26	Cole Whitt (R)	BK Racing	Toyota
27	Paul Menard	Richard Childress Racing	Chevrolet
30	J. J. Yeley (i)	Xxxtreme Motorsports	Chevrolet
31	Ryan Newman	Richard Childress Racing	Chevrolet
32	Travis Kvapil	Go FAS Racing	Ford
33	David Stremme	Circle Sport	Chevrolet
34	David Ragan	Front Row Motorsports	Ford
35	David Reutimann	Front Row Motorsports	Ford
36	Reed Sorenson	Tommy Baldwin Racing	Chevrolet
38	David Gilliland	Front Row Motorsports	Ford
40	Landon Cassill (i)	Circle Sport	Chevrolet
41	Kurt Busch (PC4)	Stewart–Haas Racing	Chevrolet
42	Kyle Larson (R)	Chip Ganassi Racing	Chevrolet
43	Aric Almirola	Richard Petty Motorsports	Ford
47	A. J. Allmendinger	JTG Daugherty Racing	Chevrolet
48	Jimmie Johnson (PC1)	Hendrick Motorsports	Chevrolet
51	Justin Allgaier (R)	HScott Motorsports	Chevrolet
55	Brian Vickers	Michael Waltrip Racing	Toyota
66	Joe Nemechek (i)	Michael Waltrip Racing	Toyota
77	Dave Blaney	Randy Humphrey Racing	Ford
78	Martin Truex Jr.	Furniture Row Racing	Chevrolet
83	Ryan Truex (R)	BK Racing	Toyota
88	Dale Earnhardt Jr.	Hendrick Motorsports	Chevrolet
95	Michael McDowell	Leavine Family Racing	Ford
98	Josh Wise	Phil Parsons Racing	Chevrolet
99	Carl Edwards	Roush Fenway Racing	Ford
Official entry list

Key	Meaning
(R)	Rookie
(i)	Ineligible for points
(PC#)	Past champions provisional

== Practice ==
=== First practice ===
Kyle Larson was the fastest in the first practice session with a time of 21.280 and a speed of 126.880 mph (204.194 km/h).

Pos	No.	Driver	Team	Manufacturer	Time	Speed
1	42	Kyle Larson (R)	Chip Ganassi Racing	Chevrolet	21.280	126.880
2	2	Brad Keselowski	Team Penske	Ford	21.396	126.192
3	15	Clint Bowyer	Michael Waltrip Racing	Toyota	21.444	125.909
Official first practice results

=== Final practice ===
Ryan Newman was the fastest in the final practice session with a time of 21.733 and a speed of 124.235 mph (199.937 km/h).

Pos	No.	Driver	Team	Manufacturer	Time	Speed
1	31	Ryan Newman	Richard Childress Racing	Chevrolet	21.733	124.235
2	14	Tony Stewart	Stewart–Haas Racing	Chevrolet	21.868	123.468
3	88	Dale Earnhardt Jr.	Hendrick Motorsports	Chevrolet	21.875	123.429
Official final practice results

== Qualifying ==
Qualifying was rained out so the starting lineup was set by first practice results. Kyle Larson earned his first career pole as a result. “We came here and tested last year for Goodyear and had a good baseline and was pretty confident with our qualifying trim without getting used to the car yet,’’ Larson said. “Then we switched over to race trim and we were good in that, so excited about that.’’ Dave Blaney and Michael McDowell failed to qualify for the race.

=== Starting lineup ===
Pos	No.	Driver	Team	Manufacturer
1	42	Kyle Larson (R)	Chip Ganassi Racing	Chevrolet
2	2	Brad Keselowski	Team Penske	Ford
3	15	Clint Bowyer	Michael Waltrip Racing	Toyota
4	5	Kasey Kahne	Hendrick Motorsports	Chevrolet
5	4	Kevin Harvick	Stewart–Haas Racing	Chevrolet
6	55	Brian Vickers	Michael Waltrip Racing	Toyota
7	1	Jamie McMurray	Chip Ganassi Racing	Chevrolet
8	83	Ryan Truex (R)	BK Racing	Toyota
9	27	Paul Menard	Richard Childress Racing	Chevrolet
10	48	Jimmie Johnson	Hendrick Motorsports	Chevrolet
11	9	Marcos Ambrose	Richard Petty Motorsports	Ford
12	20	Matt Kenseth	Joe Gibbs Racing	Toyota
13	88	Dale Earnhardt Jr.	Hendrick Motorsports	Chevrolet
14	47	A. J. Allmendinger	JTG Daugherty Racing	Chevrolet
15	43	Aric Almirola	Richard Petty Motorsports	Ford
16	99	Carl Edwards	Roush Fenway Racing	Ford
17	22	Joey Logano	Team Penske	Ford
18	31	Ryan Newman	Richard Childress Racing	Chevrolet
19	18	Kyle Busch	Joe Gibbs Racing	Toyota
20	14	Tony Stewart	Stewart–Haas Racing	Chevrolet
21	41	Kurt Busch	Stewart–Haas Racing	Chevrolet
22	78	Martin Truex Jr.	Furniture Row Racing	Chevrolet
23	7	Michael Annett (R)	Tommy Baldwin Racing	Chevrolet
24	23	Alex Bowman (R)	BK Racing	Toyota
25	24	Jeff Gordon	Hendrick Motorsports	Chevrolet
26	16	Greg Biffle	Roush Fenway Racing	Ford
27	3	Austin Dillon (R)	Richard Childress Racing	Chevrolet
28	11	Denny Hamlin	Joe Gibbs Racing	Toyota
29	17	Ricky Stenhouse Jr.	Roush Fenway Racing	Ford
30	35	David Reutimann	Front Row Motorsports	Ford
31	51	Justin Allgaier (R)	HScott Motorsports	Chevrolet
32	32	Travis Kvapil	Go FAS Racing	Ford
33	38	David Gilliland	Front Row Motorsports	Ford
34	13	Casey Mears	Germain Racing	Chevrolet
35	10	Danica Patrick	Stewart–Haas Racing	Chevrolet
36	36	Reed Sorenson	Tommy Baldwin Racing	Chevrolet
37	34	David Ragan	Front Row Motorsports	Ford
38	33	David Stremme	Circle Sport	Chevrolet
39	98	Josh Wise	Phil Parsons Racing	Chevrolet
40	26	Cole Whitt (R)	BK Racing	Toyota
41	66	Joe Nemechek	Michael Waltrip Racing	Toyota
42	30	J. J. Yeley	Xxxtreme Motorsports	Chevrolet
43	40	Landon Cassill	Circle Sport	Chevrolet
Failed to make the race
	95	Michael McDowell	Leavine Family Racing	Ford
	77	Dave Blaney	Randy Humphrey Racing	Ford
Official starting lineup

== Race ==
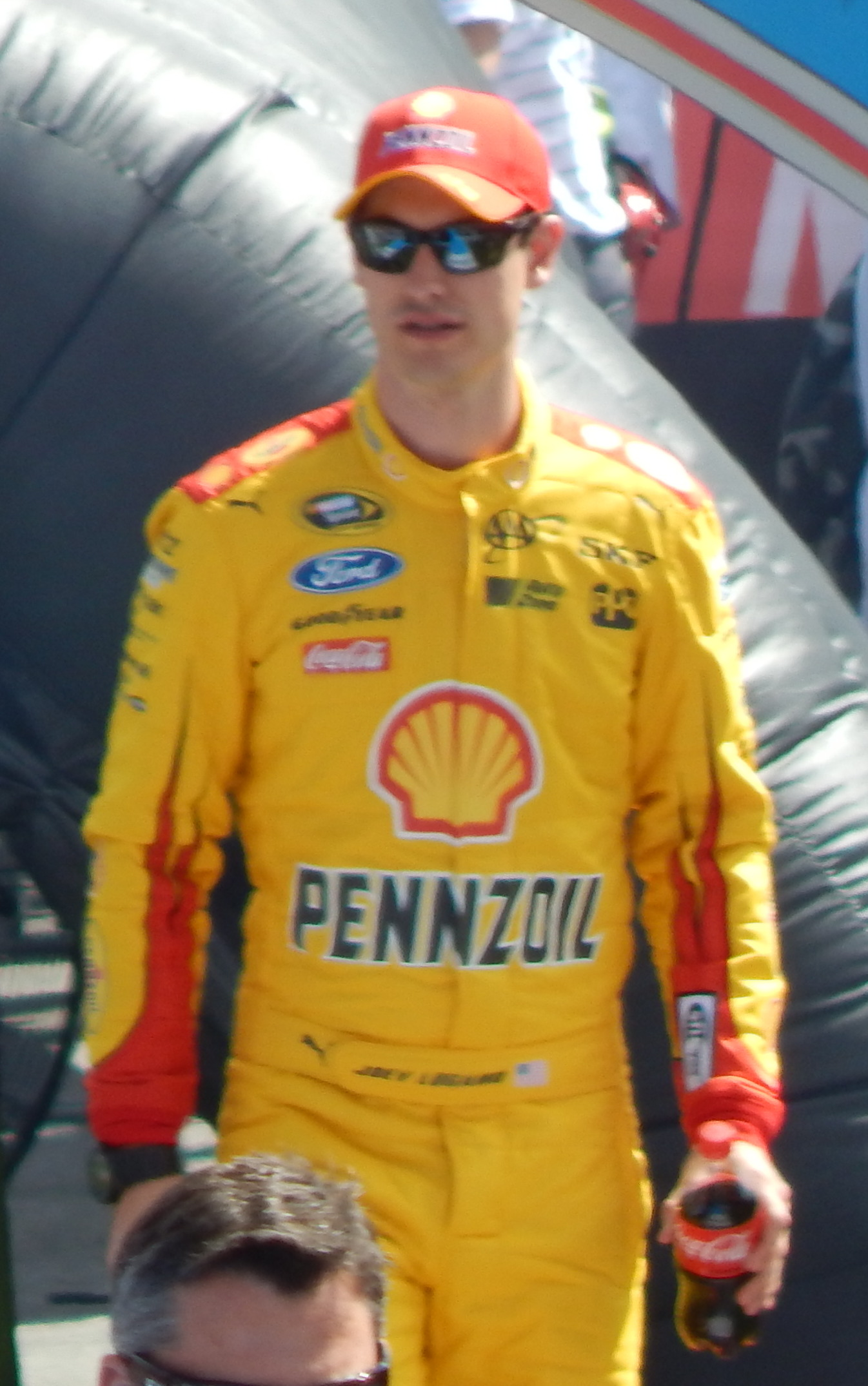
Joey Logano won the race.

Kyle Larson led the field to the green at 7:14 p.m., but the field didn't make it to turn 1 before the caution flew on the first lap when Larson drifted down in front of Clint Bowyer before he cleared him and got turned around. To make matters worse, Larson caught the tail end of the field exiting pit road and hit the rear of Landon Cassill but only suffered a minor denting in of the faux grill. While Richmond International Raceway, like Bristol Motor Speedway and Martinsville Speedway, isn't very aero-sensitive, the damage was close enough to the actual grill to cause concern. Brad Keselowski took over the lead as a result.

The race restarted on lap eight and the field made it through the lap with no accident.

Kevin Harvick took the lead on lap 32.

A scheduled competition caution (second of the race) flew on lap 41 because of overnight downpours. Travis Kvapil stayed out to lead a lap before making his stop the next lap and handing the lead back to Harvick.

The race restarted on lap 47.

Keselowski retook the lead on lap 56.

Debris in turn 4 brought out the third caution on lap 99. Landon Cassill stayed out to lead a lap before pitting. Jeff Gordon took over the lead.

The race restarted on lap 107.

Cole Whitt had a right-front tire failure on lap 157 and chunks of burning rubber from his car scattered onto the racing surface past the exit of pit road. This brought out the fourth caution of the race on lap 161. Clint Bowyer had a similar tire failure that caught fire and melted the right-front fender of the car. Gordon and Brad Keselowski swapped the lead with the former being pitted behind the start/finish line. He beat Brad off to resume leading the field.

The race restarted on lap 171.

Brad Keselowski took back the lead on lap 173.

Jeff Gordon reclaimed the top spot on lap 209.

The fifth caution of the race flew on lap 226 after Reed Sorenson cut down his right-front tire and missed the entrance to pit road. Gordon swapped the lead on pit road with Joey Logano, but came out the leader.

The race restarted on lap 239.

Joey Logano took back the lead on lap 243.

Jeff Gordon took back the lead on lap 252.

The sixth caution of the race flew on lap 296 after Ricky Stenhouse Jr. had a right-front tire failure that caught fire after hitting the wall in turn 4. Gordon swapped the lead on pit road with his teammate Dale Earnhardt Jr., but this time, Jeff Gordon got beat off pit road.

The race restarted with 96 laps to go.

Joey Logano retook the lead with 95 laps to go.

As is the case with short track races, drivers start becoming agitated and more aggressive in the closing stages of the race. Marcos Ambrose found himself being hit from behind on multiple occasions.

Jeff Gordon took back the lead with 63 laps to go.

Matt Kenseth took the lead with 39 laps to go.

Debris in turn 3 brought out the seventh caution of the race with 33 laps to go.

The race restarted with 24 laps to go and the caution flew for the eighth time after Kyle Busch turned into Justin Allgaier and then into his teammate Denny Hamlin to send him spinning in turn 3.

The race restarted with 18 laps to go and Joey Logano got a terrible restart that caused him to hold up the inside line.

The ninth caution of the race flew with 16 laps to go after J. J. Yeley blew his engine in turn 1.

The race restarted with nine laps to go. Matt Kenseth couldn't stave off the two car challenge for the lead with Jeff Gordon and Brad Keselowski. Gordon got into the rear of Keselowski and this allowed Joey Logano to get back to the lead. He built an insurmountable lead with three laps to go over Jeff Gordon to score the victory. "It feels great,” said Logano. “I want to start winning some races in the Chase now. These cars right now are so good and (Team) Penske is doing such a great job with these cars right now. I am just the lucky guy that gets to drive these things." "I had a blast tonight," said Gordon, who remained on top of the point standings. "Great short-track racing here at Richmond. And to have a race car like that to drive from 25th up to the front was so much fun."

=== Post-race ===
Brad Keselowski was not happy with Matt Kenseth and showed his displeasure during the cool down lap when he brake-checked Matt. Dale Earnhardt Jr. tried to rundown Keselowski after he ran into Kenseth because of Brad, but was stopped by an official and directed to the garage area while Brad continued to the top five impound area on pit road. “Yeah it was a wild finish,” said Keselowski, who confronted Kenseth on pit road after the race. “It just came down to really a four way battle between the 2 (Keselowski), the 20 (Kenseth), the 24 (Gordon) and 22 (Logano) and we had a great car for the short runs and we got up there challenging for the lead. The 20 car ran me off the race track so I made sure to give him a bump and that was what Joey needed to win the race. I had a shot at winning the race and he ran me off the track. It was just a mind-boggling move to me. ... I thought it was uncalled for."

The tempers didn't end on pit road. In the garage area, Casey Mears had got in a scuffle with Marcos Ambrose which ended with the latter appearing to punch the former in the face; Ambrose was fined $25,000 and Mears $15,000 (and put into probation until May 28) for the fight.

=== Race results ===
Pos	No.	Driver	Team	Manufacturer	Laps	Points
1	22	Joey Logano	Team Penske	Ford	400	47
2	24	Jeff Gordon	Hendrick Motorsports	Chevrolet	400	44
3	18	Kyle Busch	Joe Gibbs Racing	Toyota	400	41
4	2	Brad Keselowski	Team Penske	Ford	400	41
5	20	Matt Kenseth	Joe Gibbs Racing	Toyota	400	40
6	47	A. J. Allmendinger	JTG Daugherty Racing	Chevrolet	400	38
7	88	Dale Earnhardt Jr.	Hendrick Motorsports	Chevrolet	400	38
8	31	Ryan Newman	Richard Childress Racing	Chevrolet	400	36
9	99	Carl Edwards	Roush Fenway Racing	Ford	400	35
10	78	Martin Truex Jr.	Furniture Row Racing	Chevrolet	400	34
11	4	Kevin Harvick	Stewart–Haas Racing	Chevrolet	400	34
12	55	Brian Vickers	Michael Waltrip Racing	Toyota	400	32
13	1	Jamie McMurray	Chip Ganassi Racing	Chevrolet	400	31
14	5	Kasey Kahne	Hendrick Motorsports	Chevrolet	400	30
15	16	Greg Biffle	Roush Fenway Racing	Ford	400	29
16	42	Kyle Larson (R)	Chip Ganassi Racing	Chevrolet	400	28
17	43	Aric Almirola	Richard Petty Motorsports	Ford	400	27
18	9	Marcos Ambrose	Richard Petty Motorsports	Ford	400	26
19	13	Casey Mears	Germain Racing	Chevrolet	400	25
20	38	David Gilliland	Front Row Motorsports	Ford	400	24
21	51	Justin Allgaier (R)	HScott Motorsports	Chevrolet	400	23
22	11	Denny Hamlin	Joe Gibbs Racing	Toyota	400	22
23	41	Kurt Busch	Stewart–Haas Racing	Chevrolet	400	21
24	27	Paul Menard	Richard Childress Racing	Chevrolet	400	20
25	14	Tony Stewart	Stewart–Haas Racing	Chevrolet	399	19
26	40	Landon Cassill	Circle Sport	Chevrolet	398	0
27	3	Austin Dillon (R)	Richard Childress Racing	Chevrolet	398	17
28	23	Alex Bowman (R)	BK Racing	Toyota	398	16
29	35	David Reutimann	Front Row Motorsports	Ford	397	15
30	34	David Ragan	Front Row Motorsports	Ford	396	14
31	83	Ryan Truex (R)	BK Racing	Toyota	396	13
32	48	Jimmie Johnson	Hendrick Motorsports	Chevrolet	396	12
33	7	Michael Annett (R)	Tommy Baldwin Racing	Chevrolet	396	11
34	10	Danica Patrick	Stewart–Haas Racing	Chevrolet	395	10
35	33	David Stremme	Circle Sport	Chevrolet	395	9
36	32	Travis Kvapil	Go FAS Racing	Ford	394	9
37	66	Joe Nemechek	Michael Waltrip Racing	Toyota	391	0
38	17	Ricky Stenhouse Jr.	Roush Fenway Racing	Ford	390	6
39	98	Josh Wise	Phil Parsons Racing	Chevrolet	390	5
40	30	J. J. Yeley	Xxxtreme Motorsports	Chevrolet	380	0
41	26	Cole Whitt (R)	BK Racing	Toyota	367	3
42	36	Reed Sorenson	Tommy Baldwin Racing	Chevrolet	255	2
43	15	Clint Bowyer	Michael Waltrip Racing	Toyota	159	1
Race Results

=== Race statistics ===
- Lead changes: 20 among different drivers
- Cautions/Laps: 9 for 66
- Red flags: 0
- Time of race: 3 hours, 12 minutes and 47 seconds
- Average speed: 93.369 miles per hour (150.263 km/h)

== Media ==
=== Television ===
Fox Sports
Booth announcers	Pit reporters
Lap-by-lap: Mike Joy; Color-commentator: Larry McReynolds; Color commentator: Darrell Waltrip	Matt Yocum; Steve Byrnes; Krista Voda; Jeff Hammond

=== Radio ===
MRN Radio
Booth announcers	Turn announcers	Pit reporters
Lead announcer: Joe Moore; Announcer: Jeff Striegle	Backstretch: Mike Bagley	Winston Kelly; Steve Post; Alex Hayden; Woody Cain

== Standings after the race ==
Drivers' Championship standings

	Pos	Driver	Points
	1	Jeff Gordon	341
	2	Matt Kenseth	336 (−5)
	3	Carl Edwards	313 (−28)
2	4	Kyle Busch	310 (−31)
1	5	Dale Earnhardt Jr.	309 (−32)
2	6	Joey Logano	292 (−49)
	7	Brad Keselowski	287 (−54)
3	8	Jimmie Johnson	282 (−59)
	9	Ryan Newman	272 (−69)
3	10	Brian Vickers	256 (−85)
	11	Greg Biffle	256 (−85)
2	12	Austin Dillon (R)	252 (−89)
1	13	Kyle Larson (R)	251 (−90)
1	14	Denny Hamlin	245 (−96)
3	15	Tony Stewart	243 (−98)
1	16	Marcos Ambrose	242 (−99)

Manufacturers' Championship standings

Pos	Manufacturer	Points
1	Chevrolet	402
2	Ford	389 (−13)
3	Toyota	362 (−40)

- Note: Only the first sixteen positions are included for the driver standings.

Previous race: 2014 Bojangles' Southern 500	Sprint Cup Series; 2014 season	Next race: 2014 Aaron's 499
