= 2014 Irwin Tools Night Race =

Race details
- Race 24 of 36 in the 2014 NASCAR Sprint Cup Series
- Date: August 23, 2014
- Location: Bristol Motor Speedway in Bristol, Tennessee
- Course: Permanent racing facility
- Course length: 0.533 miles (0.858 km)
- Distance: 500 laps, 266.5 mi (428.89 km)
- Weather: Partly cloudy with a temperature of 82 °F (28 °C); wind out of the NNW at 5 miles per hour (8.0 km/h)
- Average speed: 92.965 mph (149.613 km/h)

Pole position
Driver	Kevin Harvick	Stewart–Haas Racing
- Time: 14.607

Most laps led
Driver	Jamie McMurray	Chip Ganassi Racing
- Laps: 148

Winner
No. 22	Joey Logano	Team Penske

Television in the United States
- Network: ABC & PRN
- Announcers: Allen Bestwick, Dale Jarrett, and Andy Petree (Television); Doug Rice and Mark Garrow (Booth); Rob Albright (Backstretch) (Radio)
- Nielsen ratings: 3.2/7 (Final); 3.0/7 (Overnight); 5.1 Million viewers

The 2014 Irwin Tools Night Race was a NASCAR Sprint Cup Series stock car race that was held on August 23, 2014, at Bristol Motor Speedway in Bristol, Tennessee. Contested over 500 laps, it was the 24th race of the 2014 NASCAR Sprint Cup Series. Joey Logano of Team Penske took his third win of the season. Logano's teammate Brad Keselowski finished second while Matt Kenseth, Jimmie Johnson, and Kurt Busch completed the top five placings. The top rookies of the race were Kyle Larson (12th), Justin Allgaier (19th), and Austin Dillon (28th). This would also be the final race for veteran NASCAR drivers Jeff Burton and Dave Blaney.

== Report ==
=== Background ===
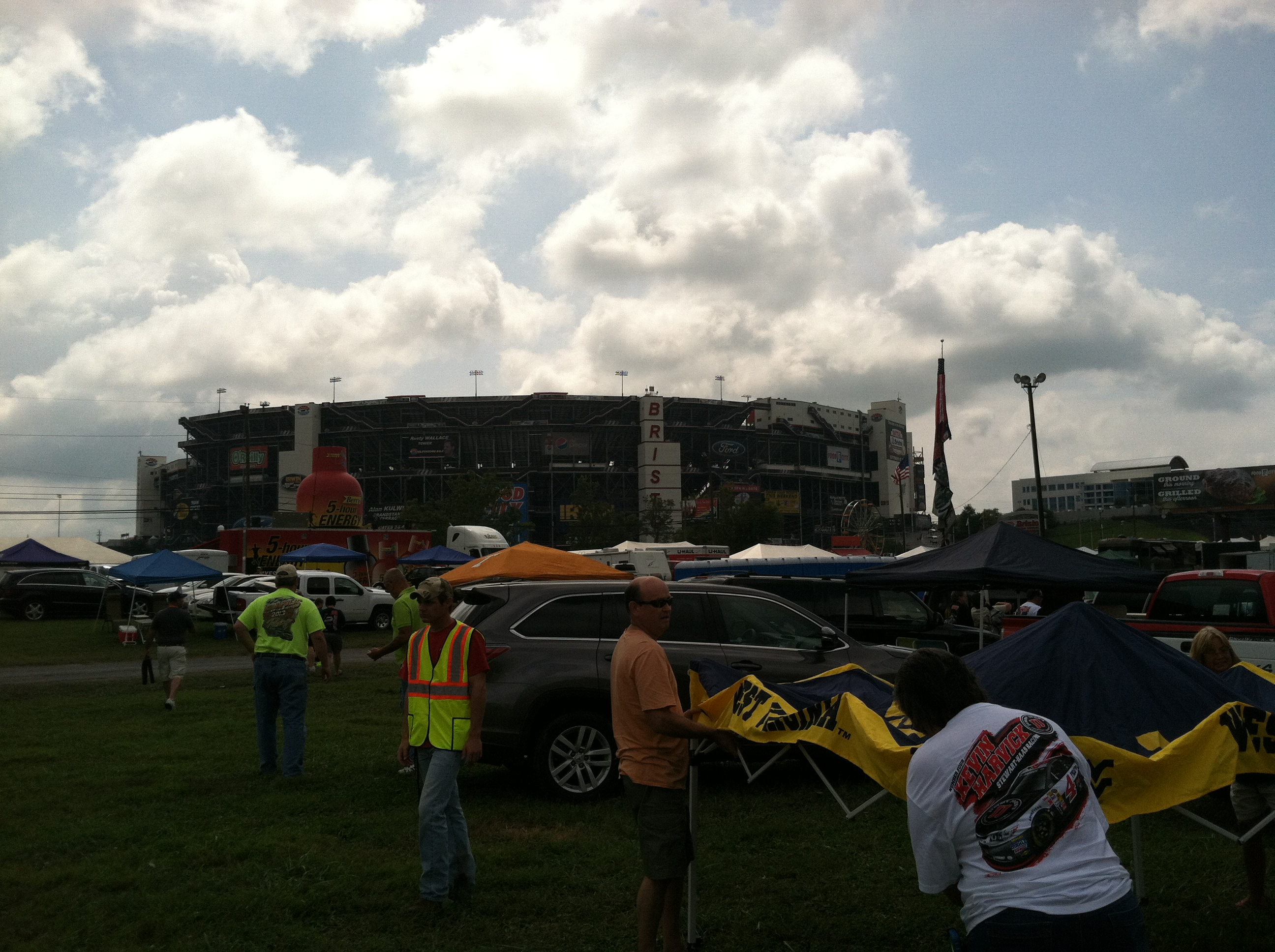
Turns 1 & 2 on Raceday at Bristol.

Bristol Motor Speedway is a four-turn short track oval that is 0.533 miles (0.858 km) long. The track's turns are banked from twenty-four to thirty degrees, while the front stretch, the location of the finish line, is banked from six to ten degrees. The back stretch also has banking from six to ten degrees. The track has a seating capacity of 160,000 people. The race consisted of 500 laps; equivalent to a race distance of 266.5 miles (428.9 km). The defending race winner was Matt Kenseth.

Tony Stewart was on the entry list for the weekend's race, but following the events that took place at Canandaigua Motorsports Park, it was unknown if he'd be in the car. On Wednesday, August 20, Stewart–Haas Racing released a statement that Stewart would sit out again and Jeff Burton would drive in his place. The team would continue to evaluate the drive on a week-by-week basis.

Ryan Truex was cleared to race at Bristol after missing the previous week's race at Michigan. He suffered a concussion in a single car crash during the second practice session and J. J. Yeley drove in his place. Truex stated that he was "happy to be back to it this weekend" on Twitter.

=== Entry list ===
The entry list for the Irwin Tools Night Race was released on Monday, August 18, 2014 at 11:05 a.m. Eastern time. Forty-three drivers were entered for the race.

No.	Driver	Team	Manufacturer
1	Jamie McMurray	Chip Ganassi Racing	Chevrolet
2	Brad Keselowski (PC2)	Team Penske	Ford
3	Austin Dillon (R)	Richard Childress Racing	Chevrolet
4	Kevin Harvick	Stewart–Haas Racing	Chevrolet
5	Kasey Kahne	Hendrick Motorsports	Chevrolet
7	Michael Annett (R)	Tommy Baldwin Racing	Chevrolet
9	Marcos Ambrose	Richard Petty Motorsports	Ford
10	Danica Patrick	Stewart–Haas Racing	Chevrolet
11	Denny Hamlin	Joe Gibbs Racing	Toyota
13	Casey Mears	Germain Racing	Chevrolet
14	Jeff Burton (Note: Tony Stewart was on the entry list for the race, but sat out following the events in upstate New York. Jeff Burton drove in his place.)	Stewart–Haas Racing	Chevrolet
15	Clint Bowyer	Michael Waltrip Racing	Toyota
16	Greg Biffle	Roush Fenway Racing	Ford
17	Ricky Stenhouse Jr.	Roush Fenway Racing	Ford
18	Kyle Busch	Joe Gibbs Racing	Toyota
20	Matt Kenseth (PC4)	Joe Gibbs Racing	Toyota
22	Joey Logano	Team Penske	Ford
23	Alex Bowman (R)	BK Racing	Toyota
24	Jeff Gordon (PC5)	Hendrick Motorsports	Chevrolet
26	Cole Whitt (R)	BK Racing	Toyota
27	Paul Menard	Richard Childress Racing	Chevrolet
31	Ryan Newman	Richard Childress Racing	Chevrolet
32	J. J. Yeley (i)	Go FAS Racing	Ford
33	David Stremme	Hillman–Circle Sport	Chevrolet
34	David Ragan	Front Row Motorsports	Ford
36	Reed Sorenson	Tommy Baldwin Racing	Chevrolet
37	Dave Blaney	Tommy Baldwin Racing	Chevrolet
38	David Gilliland	Front Row Motorsports	Ford
40	Landon Cassill (i)	Hillman–Circle Sport	Chevrolet
41	Kurt Busch (PC3)	Stewart–Haas Racing	Chevrolet
42	Kyle Larson (R)	Chip Ganassi Racing	Chevrolet
43	Aric Almirola	Richard Petty Motorsports	Ford
47	A. J. Allmendinger	JTG Daugherty Racing	Chevrolet
48	Jimmie Johnson (PC1)	Hendrick Motorsports	Chevrolet
51	Justin Allgaier (R)	HScott Motorsports	Chevrolet
55	Brian Vickers	Michael Waltrip Racing	Toyota
66	Brett Moffitt	Identity Ventures Racing	Toyota
78	Martin Truex Jr.	Furniture Row Racing	Chevrolet
83	Ryan Truex (R)	BK Racing	Toyota
88	Dale Earnhardt Jr.	Hendrick Motorsports	Chevrolet
95	Michael McDowell	Leavine Family Racing	Toyota
98	Josh Wise	Phil Parsons Racing	Chevrolet
99	Carl Edwards	Roush Fenway Racing	Ford
Official entry list

Key	Meaning
(R)	Rookie
(i)	Ineligible for points
(PC#)	Past champions provisional

== Practice ==
=== First practice ===
Kyle Larson was the fastest in the first practice session with a time of 14.638 and a speed of 131.083 mph (210.958 km/h). David Gilliland hit the wall as a result of a stuck throttle; he was forced to switch to a backup car as a result.

Pos	No.	Driver	Team	Manufacturer	Time	Speed
1	42	Kyle Larson (R)	Chip Ganassi Racing	Chevrolet	14.638	131.083
2	11	Denny Hamlin	Joe Gibbs Racing	Toyota	14.697	130.557
3	4	Kevin Harvick	Stewart–Haas Racing	Chevrolet	14.703	130.504
Official first practice results

=== Final practice ===
Ricky Stenhouse Jr. was the fastest in the final practice session with a time of 14.642 and a speed of 131.048 mph (210.901 km/h).

Pos	No.	Driver	Team	Manufacturer	Time	Speed
1	17	Ricky Stenhouse Jr.	Roush Fenway Racing	Ford	14.642	131.048
2	48	Jimmie Johnson	Hendrick Motorsports	Chevrolet	14.646	131.012
3	5	Kasey Kahne	Hendrick Motorsports	Chevrolet	14.662	130.869
Official final practice results

== Qualifying ==
Kevin Harvick won the pole with a new track record time of 14.607 and a speed of 131.362 mph (211.407 km/h). Harvick saw his qualifying position as an advantage, as he deemed that "track position is definitely as important as it is anywhere here with the current groove and where you are running" and also "felt good about our car during practice and just have to stay in there all night and do the best we can". Jeff Gordon joined Harvick on the front row, and stated that he "thought our car was a little bit better in race trim than it was in qualifying trim when we swapped over", and also stated that the conditions of the track were very tricky. Aric Almirola, Kyle Larson and Cole Whitt hit the wall during qualifying, with Almirola lamenting the fact and stating he had "probably the best race car I've ever had at Bristol and I screwed up and hit the fence".

=== Qualifying results ===
Pos	No.	Driver	Team	Manufacturer	R1	R2
1	4	Kevin Harvick	Stewart–Haas Racing	Chevrolet	14.719	14.607
2	24	Jeff Gordon	Hendrick Motorsports	Chevrolet	14.688	14.615
3	99	Carl Edwards	Roush Fenway Racing	Ford	14.722	14.624
4	18	Kyle Busch	Joe Gibbs Racing	Toyota	14.732	14.641
5	22	Joey Logano	Team Penske	Ford	14.752	14.644
6	48	Jimmie Johnson	Hendrick Motorsports	Chevrolet	14.747	14.644
7	41	Kurt Busch	Stewart–Haas Racing	Chevrolet	14.743	14.654
8	16	Greg Biffle	Roush Fenway Racing	Ford	14.752	14.662
9	2	Brad Keselowski	Team Penske	Ford	14.737	14.703
10	9	Marcos Ambrose	Richard Petty Motorsports	Ford	14.730	14.708
11	31	Ryan Newman	Richard Childress Racing	Chevrolet	14.734	14.741
12	5	Kasey Kahne	Hendrick Motorsports	Chevrolet	14.754	14.759
13	11	Denny Hamlin	Joe Gibbs Racing	Toyota	14.762	—
14	15	Clint Bowyer	Michael Waltrip Racing	Toyota	14.772	—
15	55	Brian Vickers	Michael Waltrip Racing	Toyota	14.774	—
16	20	Matt Kenseth	Joe Gibbs Racing	Toyota	14.796	—
17	27	Paul Menard	Richard Childress Racing	Chevrolet	14.796	—
18	1	Jamie McMurray	Chip Ganassi Racing	Chevrolet	14.800	—
19	51	Justin Allgaier (R)	HScott Motorsports	Chevrolet	14.810	—
20	88	Dale Earnhardt Jr.	Hendrick Motorsports	Chevrolet	14.848	—
21	17	Ricky Stenhouse Jr.	Roush Fenway Racing	Ford	14.855	—
22	47	A. J. Allmendinger	JTG Daugherty Racing	Chevrolet	14.856	—
23	78	Martin Truex Jr.	Furniture Row Racing	Chevrolet	14.892	—
24	10	Danica Patrick	Stewart–Haas Racing	Chevrolet	14.903	—
25	14	Jeff Burton	Stewart–Haas Racing	Chevrolet	14.935	—
26	3	Austin Dillon (R)	Richard Childress Racing	Chevrolet	14.960	—
27	23	Alex Bowman (R)	BK Racing	Toyota	14.992	—
28	95	Michael McDowell	Leavine Family Racing	Ford	14.994	—
29	34	David Ragan	Front Row Motorsports	Ford	15.004	—
30	98	Josh Wise	Phil Parsons Racing	Chevrolet	15.048	—
31	66	Brett Moffitt	Identity Ventures Racing	Toyota	15.053	—
32	38	David Gilliland	Front Row Motorsports	Ford	15.055	—
33	83	Ryan Truex (R)	BK Racing	Toyota	15.057	—
34	26	Cole Whitt (R)	BK Racing	Toyota	15.066	—
35	37	Dave Blaney	Randy Humphrey Racing	Ford	15.099	—
36	36	Reed Sorenson	Tommy Baldwin Racing	Chevrolet	15.102	—
37	32	J. J. Yeley	Go FAS Racing	Ford	15.184	—
38	7	Michael Annett (R)	Tommy Baldwin Racing	Chevrolet	15.200	—
39	40	Landon Cassill	Hillman–Circle Sport	Chevrolet	15.301	—
40	42	Kyle Larson (R)	Chip Ganassi Racing	Chevrolet	15.356	—
41	33	David Stremme	Hillman–Circle Sport	Chevrolet	15.506	—
42	43	Aric Almirola	Richard Petty Motorsports	Ford	0.000	—
43	13	Casey Mears	Germain Racing	Chevrolet	0.000	—
Official qualifying results

== Race ==
=== First half ===
==== Start ====
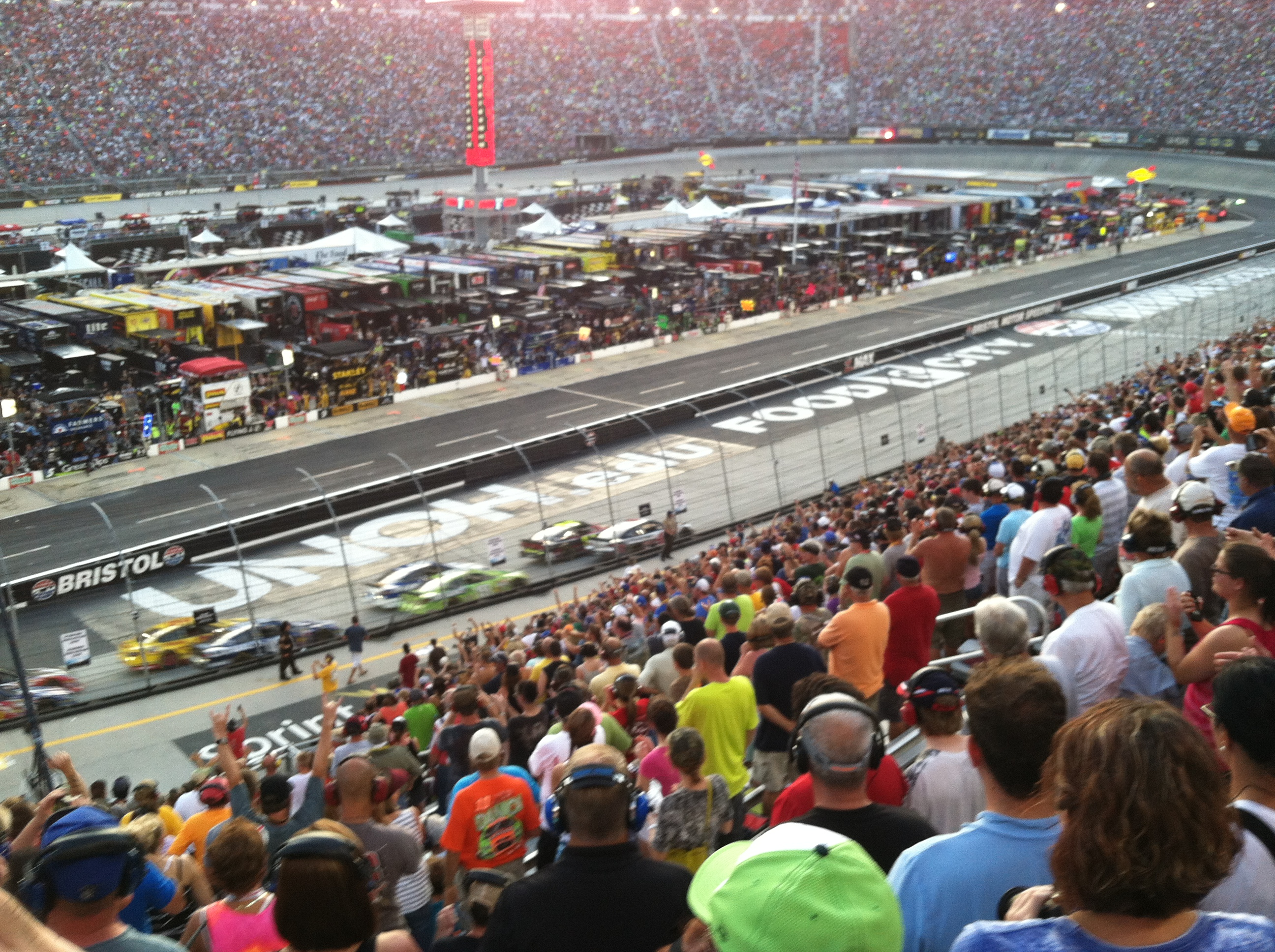
The start of the race.

The race was scheduled to start at 7:46 p.m. Eastern time but started three minutes late when Kevin Harvick led the field to the green. Harvick led the race until lap 38 when Jeff Gordon took the lead. He led until lap 55 when Kyle Busch assumed the lead of the race, and held it to the first caution of the race; at lap 61, there was a competition caution that had been scheduled due to overnight rain showers around the vicinity of the circuit. Harvick retook the lead during the caution period; Kyle Busch came off pit road as the leader, but he was sent to the rear of the field for speeding in the pits and Matt Kenseth assumed the lead for the restart on lap 68.

==== Calamity ====
The caution came out a lap later for a multi-car crash in turn 2, before the race restarted on lap 77. Kenseth maintained the lead of the race, for a good portion of the race; he was not headed until Joey Logano took the lead on lap 104. The caution flew for the third time on lap 125 for a multi-car wreck on the backstretch that began when Brian Vickers got into Kyle Larson, and then spun into Aric Almirola. Clint Bowyer then ran into Kyle Busch, sending Busch spinning into the inside wall. Denny Hamlin took the lead during the caution period, and held the lead as the race restarted on lap 137.

==== Tempers flare ====
"He thinks he knows everything. I wish I had some kind of car left to show him the favor back. We're not even halfway. It's just a misjudgment. He's a good driver. He knows better. He made a mistake. I thought for sure after the first couple of runs we were going to win the race. We were really fast. These are the racetracks we have to capitalize on. With what we've got, these are the tracks we can get wins and get the momentum going for the Chase. This is still not going to stop our momentum because we ran strong."

— Denny Hamlin, referring to Kevin Harvick after their collision while racing for the lead.

While racing for the lead, Harvick tapped Hamlin, which sent him spinning into the inside wall on the front stretch. Hamlin's car bounced off the wall, and back up towards the track where it hit the left-hand side of the car of Dale Earnhardt Jr., ripping all the protection foam out of it. This brought out the fourth caution of the race on lap 161; Hamlin subsequently threw his HANS device at Harvick's car. This was the second straight year that the two drivers had a post-crash altercation during the summer Bristol race. Post-race, Harvick described the incident as "I just lost the front end, honestly", apportioning blame on himself. Hamlin was angered at the way his race ended, which left him with a 40th-place finish. Earnhardt Jr. tried to avoid a collision with Hamlin's car, but as he described it, "there was a lot of smoke so I couldn't really judge the speed of his car to know whether I needed to be going up there and go around him on the top". The damage to his car – the lower control arm was torn off his left-front tire – left him with a 39th-place finish.

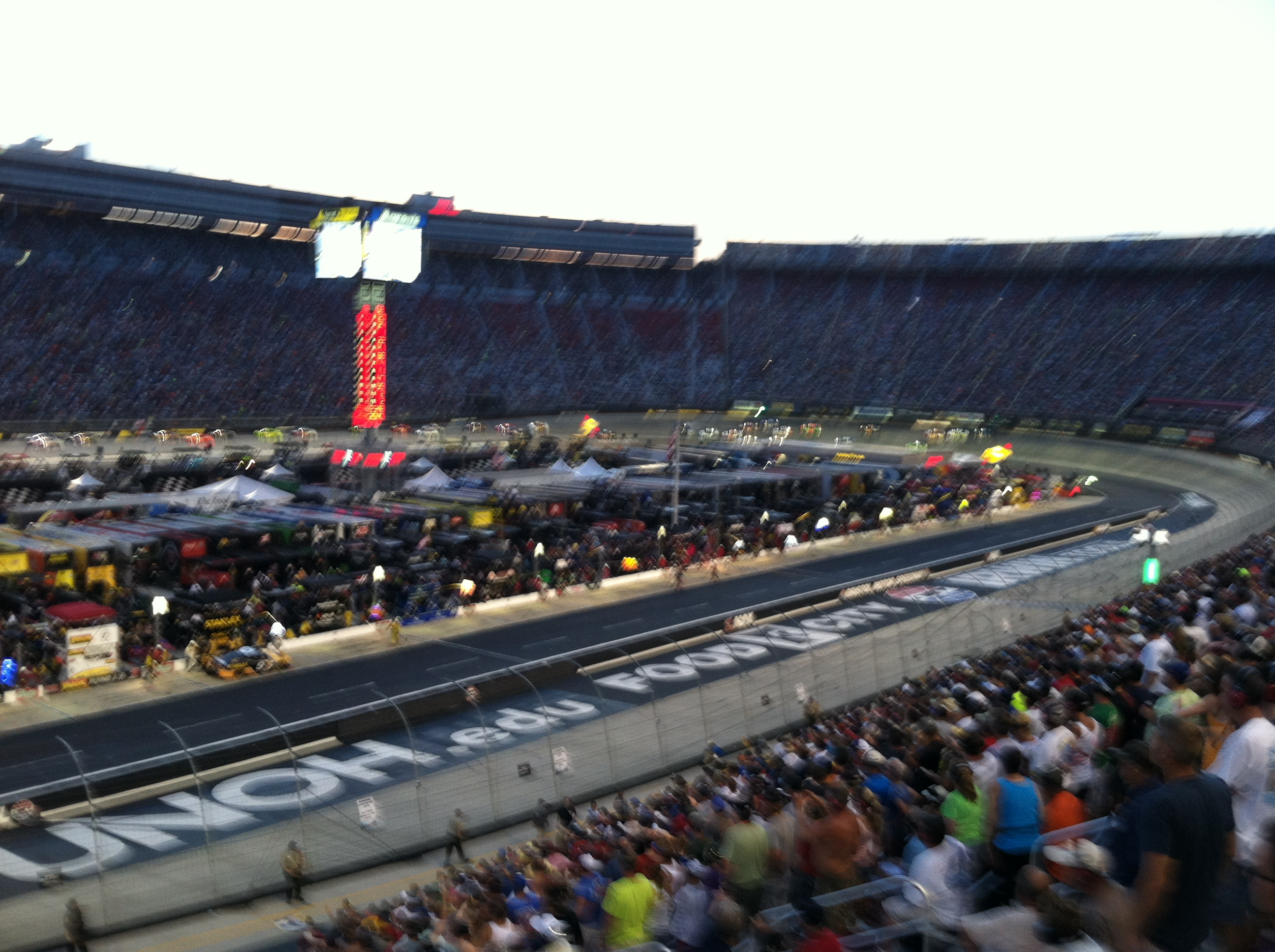
Racing at Thunder Valley.

The race restarted on lap 173 with Harvick leading the way. Harvick held the lead until the fifth caution of the race, which flew on lap 195, after Michael Annett hit the wall in turn 4. Kasey Kahne took the lead after staying out when the leaders pitted, and led the field to the restart on lap 201. Kahne led the next portion of the race, before Jamie McMurray took over at the front on lap 238. McMurray led until the caution flew for the sixth time on lap 264, after Danica Patrick got spun out by Alex Bowman in turn 2. Bowman referred to the incident as looking "like somebody slid up a couple of cars in front of her and they all checked up", and added that he spoke to Patrick post-race about the incident – this occurred after Patrick ran up on Bowman to show her displeasure, after the incident. Patrick stated that her and Bowman had made up but stated that if the two came into contact on the track again, "worse things will happen". Brad Keselowski took the lead during the pit cycle, and held the race lead for the restart on lap 270. Keselowski maintained the race beyond the 300-lap mark, and until lap 312, when McMurray assumed the lead once again. McMurray held the lead for almost 50 laps before the caution flag flew for the seventh time during the race; this was caused by debris on the track. McMurray won the race off pit road, despite Logano momentarily taking the lead through the pit process.

=== Second half ===
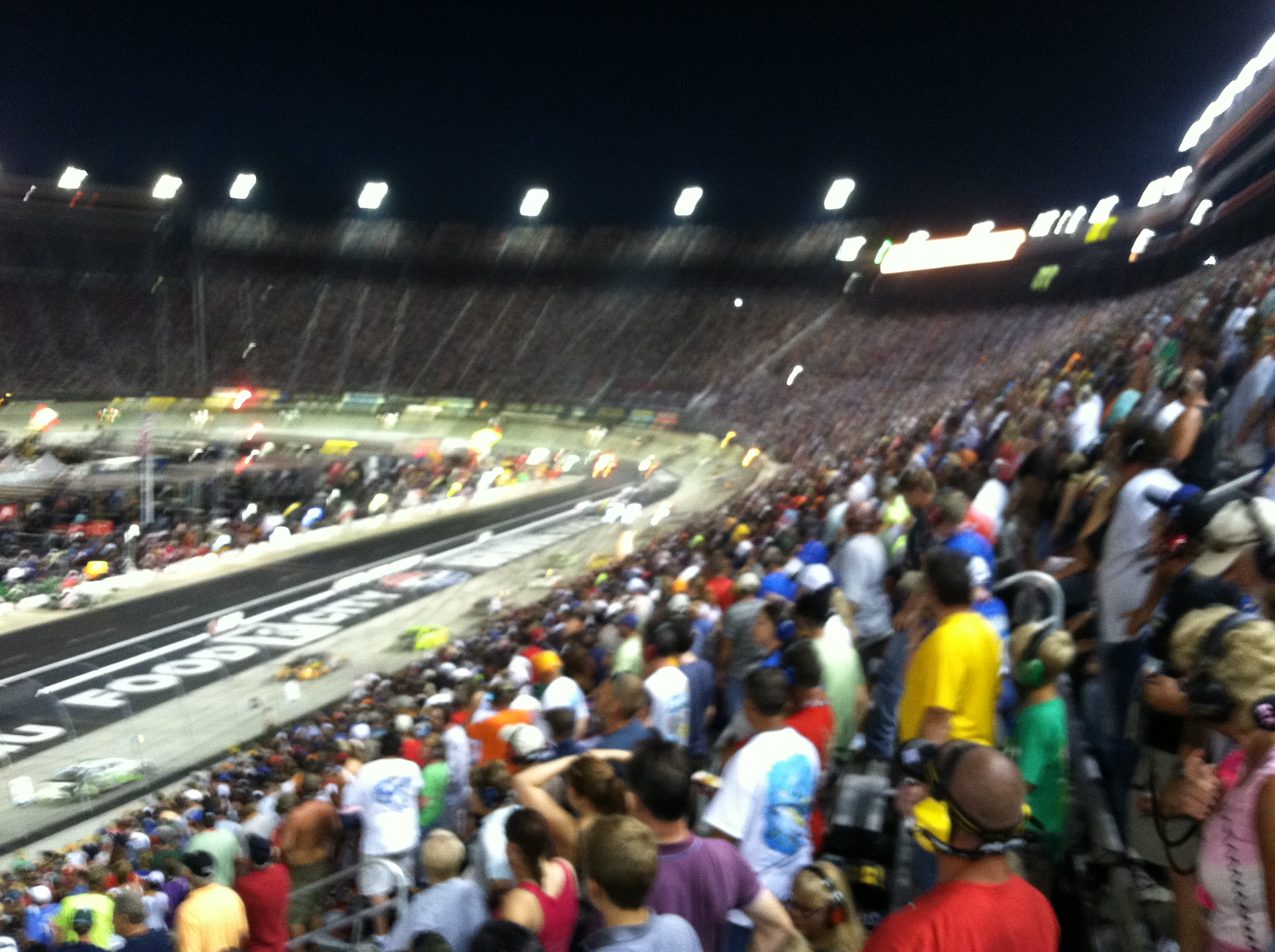
Caution on the racetrack

The race restarted on lap 367, with McMurray in the lead. It was a short-lived restart, as the caution came out for the eighth time on lap 375 after Marcos Ambrose crashed on the front stretch. McMurray again led to the restart, on lap 382. A 50-lap green-flag period followed, before the ninth and final caution of the race – on lap 431 – for debris. Logano and Matt Kenseth both led a lap during the caution period, before the restart on lap 438. Kyle Busch had been complaining late in the race about his car; he stated over his car's radio that "I need a whole new right front suspension, a whole new right front suspension". In light of his driver's complaints, crew chief Dave Rogers had no sympathy for him: "Park it behind the truck and take your whiny little ass to the bus". Busch recorded a 36th-place finish, after leading eight laps earlier in the race. Rogers deemed the race as "frustrating", and also stated that he and Busch spoke after the race following the communications over the radio, and "had a great talk". Team owner Joe Gibbs said Busch and Rogers cleared the air before they left the track, after "a frustrating night", but Gibbs was "kind of used to it". Logano took the lead with 45 laps to go and had to hold off a late race charge by Penske teammate Keselowski to score his third win of the 2014 season. Logano described the result as "awesome", and also reflected on his personal best 2014 campaign. Keselowski praised Logano's performance, stating that "he ran a great race" while his car "was just about equal to Joey's but he just had better track position than on us".

=== Race results ===
Pos	No.	Driver	Team	Manufacturer	Laps	Points
1	22	Joey Logano	Team Penske	Ford	500	47
2	2	Brad Keselowski	Team Penske	Ford	500	43
3	20	Matt Kenseth	Joe Gibbs Racing	Toyota	500	42
4	48	Jimmie Johnson	Hendrick Motorsports	Chevrolet	500	40
5	41	Kurt Busch	Stewart–Haas Racing	Chevrolet	500	39
6	17	Ricky Stenhouse Jr.	Roush Fenway Racing	Ford	500	38
7	99	Carl Edwards	Roush Fenway Racing	Ford	500	37
8	1	Jamie McMurray	Chip Ganassi Racing	Chevrolet	500	38
9	27	Paul Menard	Richard Childress Racing	Chevrolet	500	35
10	16	Greg Biffle	Roush Fenway Racing	Ford	500	34
11	4	Kevin Harvick	Stewart–Haas Racing	Chevrolet	500	34
12	42	Kyle Larson (R)	Chip Ganassi Racing	Chevrolet	500	32
13	31	Ryan Newman	Richard Childress Racing	Chevrolet	500	31
14	47	A. J. Allmendinger	JTG Daugherty Racing	Chevrolet	500	30
15	14	Jeff Burton	Stewart–Haas Racing	Chevrolet	499	29
16	24	Jeff Gordon	Hendrick Motorsports	Chevrolet	499	29
17	15	Clint Bowyer	Michael Waltrip Racing	Toyota	498	27
18	95	Michael McDowell	Leavine Family Racing	Ford	498	26
19	51	Justin Allgaier (R)	HScott Motorsports	Chevrolet	497	25
20	78	Martin Truex Jr.	Furniture Row Racing	Chevrolet	497	24
21	55	Brian Vickers	Michael Waltrip Racing	Toyota	497	23
22	40	Landon Cassill	Hillman–Circle Sport	Chevrolet	497	0
23	34	David Ragan	Front Row Motorsports	Ford	496	21
24	36	Reed Sorenson	Tommy Baldwin Racing	Chevrolet	496	20
25	38	David Gilliland	Front Row Motorsports	Ford	495	19
26	13	Casey Mears	Germain Racing	Chevrolet	495	18
27	10	Danica Patrick	Stewart–Haas Racing	Chevrolet	493	17
28	3	Austin Dillon (R)	Richard Childress Racing	Chevrolet	493	16
29	98	Josh Wise	Phil Parsons Racing	Chevrolet	492	15
30	26	Cole Whitt (R)	BK Racing	Toyota	492	14
31	33	David Stremme	Hillman–Circle Sport	Chevrolet	491	13
32	23	Alex Bowman (R)	BK Racing	Toyota	489	12
33	32	J. J. Yeley	Go FAS Racing	Ford	489	0
34	9	Marcos Ambrose	Richard Petty Motorsports	Ford	480	10
35	5	Kasey Kahne	Hendrick Motorsports	Chevrolet	477	10
36	18	Kyle Busch	Joe Gibbs Racing	Toyota	442	9
37	83	Ryan Truex (R)	BK Racing	Toyota	338	7
38	7	Michael Annett (R)	Tommy Baldwin Racing	Chevrolet	243	6
39	88	Dale Earnhardt Jr.	Hendrick Motorsports	Chevrolet	176	5
40	11	Denny Hamlin	Joe Gibbs Racing	Toyota	160	5
41	43	Aric Almirola	Richard Petty Motorsports	Ford	123	3
42	66	Brett Moffitt	Identity Ventures Racing	Toyota	78	2
43	37	Dave Blaney	Randy Humphrey Racing	Ford	37	1

=== Race statistics ===
- 16 lead changes among different drivers
- 9 cautions for 64 laps
- Time of race: 2:52:00
- Joey Logano won his first race at Bristol

== Media ==
=== Television ===
ABC
Booth announcers	Pit reporters
Lap-by-lap: Allen Bestwick; Color-commentator: Dale Jarrett; Color commentator: Andy Petree	Jerry Punch; Dave Burns; Vince Welch; Jamie Little

=== Radio ===
PRN Radio
Booth announcers	Turn announcers	Pit reporters
Lead announcer: Doug Rice; Announcer: Mark Garrow	Backstretch: Rob Albright	Brett McMillan; Steve Richards; Jim Noble; Wendy Venturini

== Standings after the race ==
Drivers' Championship standings

	Pos	Driver	Points
	1	Jeff Gordon	845
	2	Dale Earnhardt Jr.	818 (−27)
	3	Brad Keselowski	776 (−69)
	4	Joey Logano	761 (−84)
	5	Matt Kenseth	751 (−94)
1	6	Jimmie Johnson	726 (−119)
1	7	Kevin Harvick	721 (−124)
	8	Carl Edwards	716 (−129)
	9	Ryan Newman	710 (−135)
	10	Clint Bowyer	699 (−146)
	11	Greg Biffle	694 (−151)
2	12	Kyle Larson (R)	668 (−177)
1	13	Kasey Kahne	661 (−184)
1	14	Austin Dillon (R)	654 (−191)
2	15	Paul Menard	649 (−196)
3	16	Jamie McMurray	634 (−211)

Manufacturers' Championship standings

Pos	Manufacturer	Points
1	Chevrolet	1,077
2	Ford	1,049 (−28)
3	Toyota	963 (−114)

- Note: Only the first sixteen positions are included for the driver standings.

== Note ==
Previous race: 2014 Pure Michigan 400	Sprint Cup Series; 2014 season	Next race: 2014 Oral-B USA 500
