= Billy Clevenger =

American racing driver

- Nationality: American
- Born: July 9, 1977 (age 49) McConnellsburg, Pennsylvania, U.S.

NASCAR Goody's Dash Series career
- Debut season: 2002
- Years active: 2002–2003
- Starts: 8
- Championships: 0
- Wins: 0
- Poles: 0
- Best finish: 17th in 2003
- Statistics up to date as of December 21, 2024.

Billy Clevenger (born July 9, 1977) is an American former professional stock car racing driver who competed in the NASCAR Goody's Dash Series from 2002 to 2003.

Clevenger also competed in the IPOWER Dash Series.

== Motorsports results ==
=== NASCAR ===
(key) (Bold – Pole position awarded by qualifying time. Italics – Pole position earned by points standings or practice time. * – Most laps led.)

==== Goody's Dash Series ====
NASCAR Goody's Dash Series results
Year	Team	No.	Make	1	2	3	4	5	6	7	8	9	10	11	12	13	14	NGDS	Pts	Ref
2002	Clevenger Racing	15	Mercury	DAY	HAR	ROU	LON	CLT	KEN	MEM	GRE	SNM	SBO	MYB; 17	BRI	MOT; 15	ATL	44th	230	
2003	Clevenger Racing	15	Ford	DAY	OGL	CLT; 20	SBO; 17	GRE; 14	KEN; 9	BRI; 18	ATL; 8							17th	725	
