= 2014 Pocono 400 =

Race details
- Race 14 of 36 in the 2014 NASCAR Sprint Cup Series
- Date: June 8, 2014
- Location: Pocono Raceway, Long Pond, Pennsylvania
- Course: Permanent racing facility
- Course length: 2.5 miles (4 km)
- Distance: 160 laps, 400 mi (643.737 km)
- Weather: Sunny with a temperature around 76 °F (24 °C); wind out of the south at 8 miles per hour (13 km/h).
- Average speed: 139.440 mph (224.407 km/h)

Pole position
Driver	Denny Hamlin	Joe Gibbs Racing
- Time: 49.610

Most laps led
Driver	Brad Keselowski	Team Penske
- Laps: 95

Winner
No. 88	Dale Earnhardt Jr.	Hendrick Motorsports

Television in the United States
- Network: TNT & MRN
- Announcers: Adam Alexander, Wally Dallenbach Jr. and Kyle Petty (Television); Joe Moore, Barney Hall and Jeff Striegle (Booth); Dave Moody (1), Mike Bagley (2) and Buddy Long (3) (Turns) (Radio)
- Nielsen ratings: 3.0/8; 4.5 Million viewers

The 2014 Pocono 400 was a NASCAR Sprint Cup Series stock car race held on June 8, 2014, at Pocono Raceway in Long Pond, Pennsylvania. Contested over 160 laps on the 2.5 miles (4.0 km) triangular superspeedway, it was the 14th race of the 2014 NASCAR Sprint Cup Series. Dale Earnhardt Jr. won the race, his second of the season and his first at Pocono. Brad Keselowski finished second, while Kurt Busch, Denny Hamlin, and Kyle Larson (who placed as the highest finishing rookie) rounded out the Top 5. Behind Larson, the other top rookies in the race were Austin Dillon (17th) and Michael Annett (20th).

Earnhardt Jr. was the fourth straight different driver from Hendrick Motorsports to win at Pocono, following Jeff Gordon's rain-shortened win in August 2012 and Jimmie Johnson and Kasey Kahne in the June and August 2013 (respectively) races.

== Report ==
=== Entry list ===
The entry list for the Pocono 400 was released on Tuesday, June 3, 2014, at 11:09 a.m. Eastern time. Forty-three drivers were entered for the race which meant no one failed to make the race.

No.	Driver	Team	Manufacturer
1	Jamie McMurray	Chip Ganassi Racing	Chevrolet
2	Brad Keselowski (PC2)	Team Penske	Ford
3	Austin Dillon (R)	Richard Childress Racing	Chevrolet
4	Kevin Harvick	Stewart–Haas Racing	Chevrolet
5	Kasey Kahne	Hendrick Motorsports	Chevrolet
7	Michael Annett (R)	Tommy Baldwin Racing	Chevrolet
9	Marcos Ambrose	Richard Petty Motorsports	Ford
10	Danica Patrick	Stewart–Haas Racing	Chevrolet
11	Denny Hamlin	Joe Gibbs Racing	Toyota
13	Casey Mears	Germain Racing	Chevrolet
14	Tony Stewart (PC3)	Stewart–Haas Racing	Chevrolet
15	Clint Bowyer	Michael Waltrip Racing	Toyota
16	Greg Biffle	Roush Fenway Racing	Ford
17	Ricky Stenhouse Jr.	Roush Fenway Racing	Ford
18	Kyle Busch	Joe Gibbs Racing	Toyota
20	Matt Kenseth (PC5)	Joe Gibbs Racing	Toyota
22	Joey Logano	Team Penske	Ford
23	Alex Bowman (R)	BK Racing	Toyota
24	Jeff Gordon (PC6)	Hendrick Motorsports	Chevrolet
26	Cole Whitt (R)	BK Racing	Toyota
27	Paul Menard	Richard Childress Racing	Chevrolet
31	Ryan Newman	Richard Childress Racing	Chevrolet
32	Travis Kvapil	Go FAS Racing	Ford
33	David Stremme	Circle Sport	Chevrolet
34	David Ragan	Front Row Motorsports	Ford
36	Reed Sorenson	Tommy Baldwin Racing	Chevrolet
38	David Gilliland	Front Row Motorsports	Ford
40	Landon Cassill (i)	Circle Sport	Chevrolet
41	Kurt Busch (PC4)	Stewart–Haas Racing	Chevrolet
42	Kyle Larson (R)	Chip Ganassi Racing	Chevrolet
43	Aric Almirola	Richard Petty Motorsports	Ford
44	J. J. Yeley (i)	Xxxtreme Motorsports	Chevrolet
47	A. J. Allmendinger	JTG Daugherty Racing	Chevrolet
48	Jimmie Johnson (PC1)	Hendrick Motorsports	Chevrolet
51	Justin Allgaier (R)	HScott Motorsports	Chevrolet
55	Brian Vickers	Michael Waltrip Racing	Toyota
66	Timmy Hill	Michael Waltrip Racing	Toyota
77	Dave Blaney	Randy Humphrey Racing	Ford
78	Martin Truex Jr.	Furniture Row Racing	Chevrolet
83	Ryan Truex (R)	BK Racing	Toyota
88	Dale Earnhardt Jr.	Hendrick Motorsports	Chevrolet
98	Josh Wise	Phil Parsons Racing	Ford
99	Carl Edwards	Roush Fenway Racing	Ford
Official entry list

Key	Meaning
(R)	Rookie
(i)	Ineligible for points
(PC#)	Past champions provisional

== Practice ==
=== First practice ===
Brian Vickers was the fastest in first practice with a time of 49.764 and a speed of 180.854 mph (291.056 km/h).

Pos	No.	Driver	Team	Manufacturer	Time	Speed
1	55	Brian Vickers	Michael Waltrip Racing	Toyota	49.764	180.854
2	2	Brad Keselowski	Team Penske	Ford	49.938	180.223
3	4	Kevin Harvick	Stewart–Haas Racing	Chevrolet	50.052	179.813
Official first practice results

== Qualifying ==
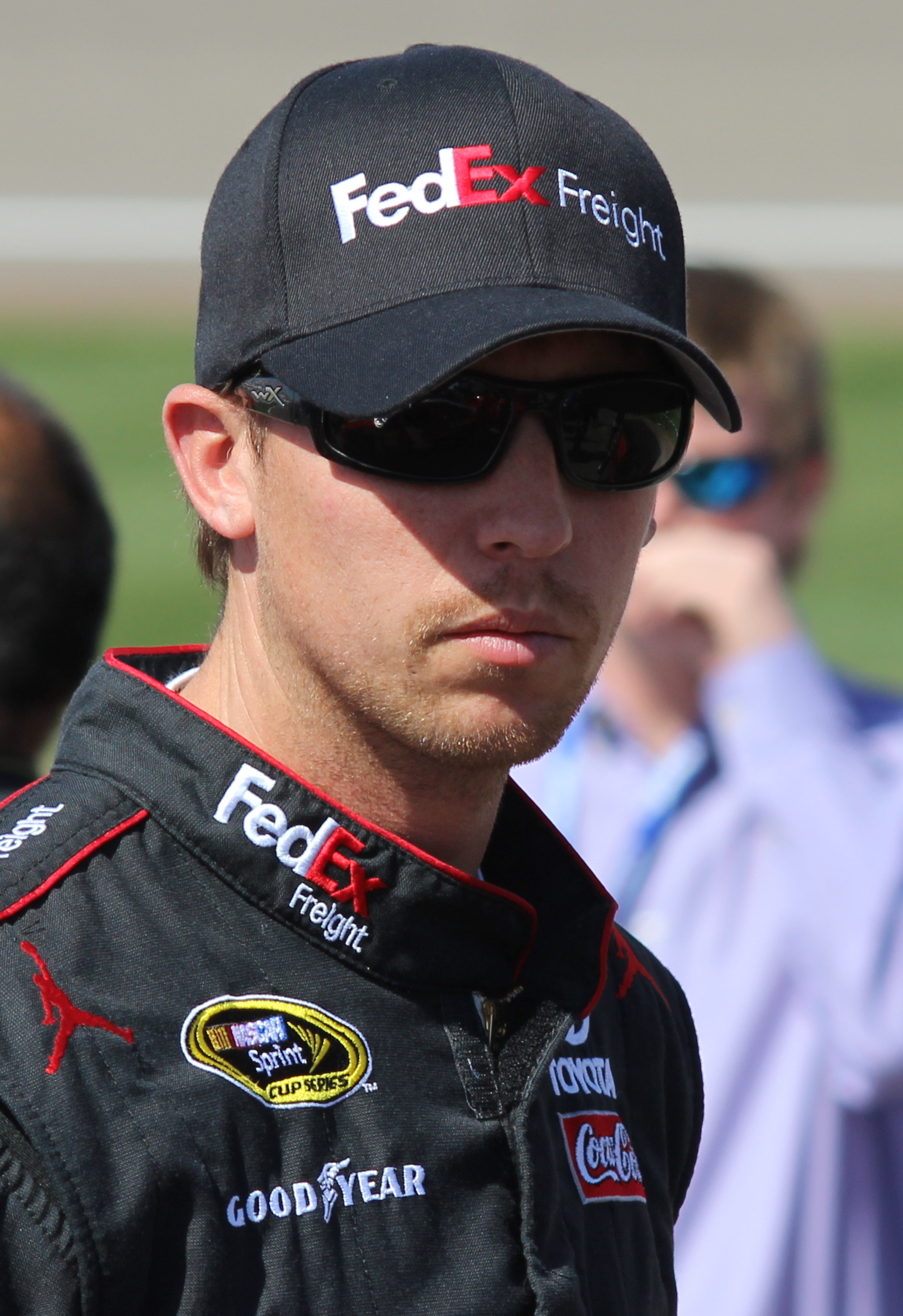
Denny Hamlin won the pole position, setting a new track record.

Denny Hamlin won the pole for the race with a time of 49.610 – a new track record – and a speed of 181.415 mph (291.959 km/h). "It's a tough balance, but we really just made the car a lot better," Hamlin said. "Each session our balance got a little bit better and we were able to get a little bit more speed out of it. That's kind of what you want to do, play it enough in the first few rounds to get to the final round where you go all out. Good job by our FedEx Ground Toyota team. We didn't test up here, we're one of the only teams that didn't test, but it's good to at least have a good Friday."

=== Qualifying results ===
Pos	No.	Driver	Team	Manufacturer	R1	R2	R3
1	11	Denny Hamlin	Joe Gibbs Racing	Toyota	50.360	50.010	49.610
2	41	Kurt Busch	Stewart–Haas Racing	Chevrolet	50.104	49.700	49.612
3	2	Brad Keselowski	Team Penske	Ford	50.430	49.798	49.637
4	4	Kevin Harvick	Stewart–Haas Racing	Chevrolet	50.193	50.001	49.770
5	24	Jeff Gordon	Hendrick Motorsports	Chevrolet	50.123	50.085	49.858
6	18	Kyle Busch	Joe Gibbs Racing	Toyota	50.418	49.904	49.873
7	22	Joey Logano	Team Penske	Ford	50.255	50.089	50.048
8	88	Dale Earnhardt Jr.	Hendrick Motorsports	Chevrolet	50.507	50.174	50.121
9	55	Brian Vickers	Michael Waltrip Racing	Toyota	49.992	49.999	50.126
10	99	Carl Edwards	Roush Fenway Racing	Ford	50.481	50.110	50.172
11	3	Austin Dillon (R)	Richard Childress Racing	Chevrolet	50.428	50.201	50.188
12	14	Tony Stewart	Stewart–Haas Racing	Toyota	50.209	50.014	50.244
13	16	Greg Biffle	Roush Fenway Racing	Ford	50.370	50.207	—
14	42	Kyle Larson (R)	Chip Ganassi Racing	Chevrolet	50.536	50.215	—
15	31	Ryan Newman	Richard Childress Racing	Chevrolet	50.294	50.259	—
16	10	Danica Patrick	Stewart–Haas Racing	Chevrolet	50.233	50.265	—
17	78	Martin Truex Jr.	Furniture Row Racing	Chevrolet	50.485	50.286	—
18	1	Jamie McMurray	Chip Ganassi Racing	Chevrolet	50.348	50.302	—
19	15	Clint Bowyer	Michael Waltrip Racing	Toyota	50.479	50.342	—
20	48	Jimmie Johnson	Hendrick Motorsports	Chevrolet	50.158	50.370	—
21	47	A. J. Allmendinger	JTG Daugherty Racing	Chevrolet	50.279	50.480	—
22	43	Aric Almirola	Richard Petty Motorsports	Ford	50.494	50.521	—
23	27	Paul Menard	Richard Childress Racing	Chevrolet	50.521	50.553	—
24	51	Justin Allgaier (R)	HScott Motorsports	Chevrolet	50.529	50.765	—
25	13	Casey Mears	Germain Racing	Chevrolet	50.549	—	—
26	20	Matt Kenseth	Joe Gibbs Racing	Toyota	50.571	—	—
27	5	Kasey Kahne	Hendrick Motorsports	Chevrolet	50.588	—	—
28	17	Ricky Stenhouse Jr.	Roush Fenway Racing	Ford	50.610	—	—
29	9	Marcos Ambrose	Richard Petty Motorsports	Ford	50.801	—	—
30	7	Michael Annett (R)	Tommy Baldwin Racing	Chevrolet	51.047	—	—
31	40	Landon Cassill	Circle Sport	Chevrolet	51.129	—	—
32	34	David Ragan	Front Row Motorsports	Ford	51.159	—	—
33	32	Travis Kvapil	Go FAS Racing	Ford	51.175	—	—
34	23	Alex Bowman (R)	BK Racing	Toyota	51.231	—	—
35	38	David Gilliland	Front Row Motorsports	Ford	51.249	—	—
36	36	Reed Sorenson	Tommy Baldwin Racing	Chevrolet	51.441	—	—
37	98	Josh Wise	Phil Parsons Racing	Ford	51.503	—	—
38	44	J. J. Yeley	Xxxtreme Motorsports	Chevrolet	51.733	—	—
39	66	Timmy Hill	Identity Ventures Racing	Toyota	51.945	—	—
40	26	Cole Whitt (R)	BK Racing	Toyota	52.081	—	—
41	83	Ryan Truex (R)	BK Racing	Toyota	52.188	—	—
42	33	Alex Kennedy	Circle Sport	Chevrolet	53.037	—	—
43	77	Dave Blaney	Randy Humphrey Racing	Ford	0.000	—	—
Qualifying Results

== Practice (post-qualifying) ==
=== Second practice ===
Kevin Harvick was the fastest in the second practice session with a time of 50.764 and a speed of 177.291 mph (285.322 km/h).

Pos	No.	Driver	Team	Manufacturer	Time	Speed
1	4	Kevin Harvick	Stewart–Haas Racing	Chevrolet	50.764	177.291
2	2	Brad Keselowski	Team Penske	Ford	50.787	177.211
3	55	Brian Vickers	Michael Waltrip Racing	Toyota	50.823	177.085
Official second practice results

=== Final practice ===
Harvick was the fastest in the final practice session with a time of 51.251 and a speed of 175.606 mph (282.610 km/h). Aric Almirola had to change his transmission after fluid started leaking out of it with 15 minutes left in practice. It was initially thought that he lost an engine.

Pos	No.	Driver	Team	Manufacturer	Time	Speed
1	4	Kevin Harvick	Stewart–Haas Racing	Chevrolet	51.251	175.606
2	41	Kurt Busch	Stewart–Haas Racing	Chevrolet	51.269	175.545
3	48	Jimmie Johnson	Hendrick Motorsports	Chevrolet	51.296	175.452
Official final practice results

== Race ==
=== First half ===
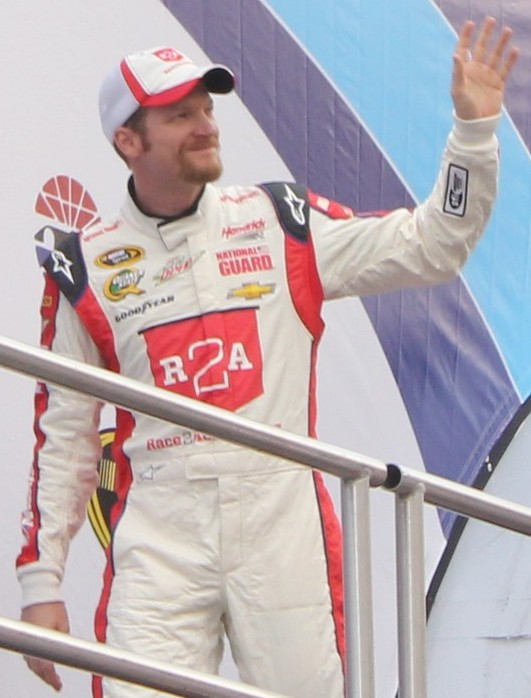
Dale Earnhardt Jr. won the race.

==== Start ====
Denny Hamlin led the field to the green flag at 1:20 p.m. but Brad Keselowski took the lead from him to lead lap one. The first caution of the day came out at lap 32 for a fire in the inside wall in turn 3. The fire apparently was in the area where pyrotechnics were launched during the pre-race ceremonies. After getting into the rear of Jamie McMurray and damaging the front of the car on the ensuing restart, points leader Matt Kenseth wound up going a lap down on lap 50. Keselowski led the first 56 laps until he came in to pit and Jeff Gordon took the lead for one lap before handing it to Tony Stewart.

The second caution of the race came out on lap 60 for debris in turn three in the middle of green flag stops. Debris on the back stretch, from J. J. Yeley's car, brought out the third caution of the race on lap 72. Stewart took the lead from Keselowski on the restart. A spin in turn 1 by Dave Blaney brought out the fourth caution on lap 80. Kurt Busch took the lead from Stewart on lap 84, before Stewart regained the lead from Busch five laps later. Rookie Kyle Larson led his first ever lap in Sprint Cup competition on lap 102, before Jimmie Johnson found his way to the lead for the first time at lap 109; he pitted not long after, ceding the lead to another rookie, Michael Annett.

=== Second half ===
Stewart re-took the lead on lap 112 after the green flag stops cycled through, while team-mate Kevin Harvick had a flat tire four laps later. The fifth caution of the race came out on lap 118 for fluid on the race track. Stewart was too fast entering pit road and had to serve a drive-through penalty, handing the lead to Keselowski. Justin Allgaier led his first ever lap on lap 134, before Danica Patrick brought out the sixth caution, by crashing at turn three. The seventh caution of the race came out with 18 laps to go. Kasey Kahne, Kyle Busch, Carl Edwards and Greg Biffle were involved.

==== Finish ====
Dale Earnhardt Jr. took the lead from Brad Keselowski with five laps to go and took the checkered flag. He inherited the lead after Keselowski dropped back to try to remove the piece of trash on his grill. "That's unfortunate for him," Earnhardt said. "He had me beat. I couldn't get to him. It's real hard to pass here. I've lost some in strange ways. It feels good to win one like that. Brad definitely had the better car. I'll own up to that, but we won the race." Keselowski stated that his car "was running really hot" and that he thought it "was going to blow up".

=== Race results ===
Pos	No.	Driver	Team	Manufacturer	Laps	Points
1	88	Dale Earnhardt Jr.	Hendrick Motorsports	Chevrolet	160	47
2	2	Brad Keselowski	Team Penske	Ford	160	44
3	41	Kurt Busch	Stewart–Haas Racing	Chevrolet	160	42
4	11	Denny Hamlin	Joe Gibbs Racing	Toyota	160	41
5	42	Kyle Larson (R)	Chip Ganassi Racing	Chevrolet	160	40
6	48	Jimmie Johnson	Hendrick Motorsports	Chevrolet	160	39
7	31	Ryan Newman	Richard Childress Racing	Chevrolet	160	37
8	24	Jeff Gordon	Hendrick Motorsports	Chevrolet	160	37
9	78	Martin Truex Jr.	Furniture Row Racing	Chevrolet	160	35
10	1	Jamie McMurray	Chip Ganassi Racing	Chevrolet	160	34
11	15	Clint Bowyer	Michael Waltrip Racing	Toyota	160	33
12	18	Kyle Busch	Joe Gibbs Racing	Toyota	160	32
13	14	Tony Stewart	Stewart–Haas Racing	Chevrolet	160	32
14	4	Kevin Harvick	Stewart–Haas Racing	Chevrolet	160	30
15	17	Ricky Stenhouse Jr.	Roush Fenway Racing	Ford	160	29
16	16	Greg Biffle	Roush Fenway Racing	Ford	160	28
17	3	Austin Dillon (R)	Richard Childress Racing	Chevrolet	160	27
18	34	David Ragan	Front Row Motorsports	Ford	160	26
19	55	Brian Vickers	Michael Waltrip Racing	Toyota	160	26
20	7	Michael Annett (R)	Tommy Baldwin Racing	Chevrolet	160	24
21	47	A. J. Allmendinger	JTG Daugherty Racing	Chevrolet	160	23
22	43	Aric Almirola	Richard Petty Motorsports	Ford	160	22
23	13	Casey Mears	Germain Racing	Chevrolet	160	21
24	9	Marcos Ambrose	Richard Petty Motorsports	Ford	160	20
25	20	Matt Kenseth	Joe Gibbs Racing	Toyota	160	19
26	27	Paul Menard	Richard Childress Racing	Chevrolet	160	18
27	51	Justin Allgaier (R)	HScott Motorsports	Chevrolet	160	18
28	38	David Gilliland	Front Row Motorsports	Ford	160	16
29	32	Travis Kvapil	Go FAS Racing	Ford	160	15
30	26	Cole Whitt (R)	BK Racing	Toyota	159	14
31	23	Alex Bowman (R)	BK Racing	Toyota	159	13
32	83	Ryan Truex (R)	BK Racing	Toyota	159	12
33	40	Landon Cassill	Circle Sport	Chevrolet	158	0
34	36	Reed Sorenson	Circle Sport	Chevrolet	158	10
35	98	Josh Wise	Phil Parsons Racing	Ford	158	9
36	66	Timmy Hill	Identity Ventures Racing	Toyota	158	8
37	10	Danica Patrick	Stewart–Haas Racing	Chevrolet	158	7
38	44	J. J. Yeley	Xxxtreme Motorsports	Chevrolet	157	0
39	33	Alex Kennedy	Circle Sport	Chevrolet	156	5
40	22	Joey Logano	Team Penske	Ford	150	4
41	99	Carl Edwards	Roush Fenway Racing	Ford	143	3
42	5	Kasey Kahne	Hendrick Motorsports	Chevrolet	142	2
43	77	Dave Blaney	Randy Humphrey Racing	Ford	142	1
Race Results

=== Race statistics ===
- Lead changes: 21 among different drivers
- Cautions/Laps: 7 for 26
- Red flags: 0
- Time of race: 2 hours, 52 minutes and 7 seconds
- Average speed: 139.440 miles per hour (224.407 km/h)
- Dale Earnhardt Jr. took home $198.965 in winnings

== Media ==
=== Television ===
TNT Sports
Booth announcers	Pit reporters
Lap-by-lap: Adam Alexander; Color-commentator: Wally Dallenbach Jr. Color commentator: Kyle Petty	Matt Yocum; Marty Snider; Chris Neville; Ralph Sheheen

=== Radio ===
MRN Radio
Booth announcers	Turn announcers	Pit reporters
Lead announcer: Joe Moore; Announcer: Barney Hall; Announcer: Jeff Striegle	Turn 1: Dave Moody; Turn 2: Mike Bagley; Turn 3: Buddy Long	Winston Kelly; Steve Post; Alex Hayden; Woody Cain

== Standings after the race ==
Drivers' Championship standings

	Pos	Driver	Points
1	1	Jeff Gordon	498
1	2	Matt Kenseth	482 (−16)
2	3	Dale Earnhardt Jr.	476 (−22)
	4	Jimmie Johnson	475 (−23)
3	5	Brad Keselowski	448 (−50)
1	6	Kyle Busch	443 (−55)
4	7	Carl Edwards	441 (−57)
1	8	Denny Hamlin	420 (−78)
3	9	Joey Logano	418 (−80)
	10	Kyle Larson (R)	417 (−81)
	11	Ryan Newman	411 (−87)
	12	Kevin Harvick	403 (−95)
	13	Brian Vickers	392 (−106)
2	14	Greg Biffle	385 (−113)
	15	Austin Dillon (R)	385 (−113)
1	16	Clint Bowyer	383 (−115)

Manufacturers' Championship standings

Pos	Manufacturer	Points
1	Chevrolet	632
2	Ford	602 (−30)
3	Toyota	569 (−63)

- Note: Only the first sixteen positions are included for the driver standings.

Previous race: 2014 FedEx 400	Sprint Cup Series; 2014 season	Next race: 2014 Quicken Loans 400
