= Randy Humphrey =

American racing driver and team owner

- Born: March 28, 1960 (age 66) Cornelius, North Carolina, U.S.

NASCAR Goody's Dash Series career
- Debut season: 1998
- Years active: 1998–2003
- Starts: 69
- Championships: 0
- Wins: 0
- Poles: 1
- Best finish: 4th in 2003
- Statistics up to date as of December 11, 2024.

Randy Humphrey (born March 28, 1960) is an American former professional stock car racing driver and team owner who competed in the NASCAR Goody's Dash Series from 1998 to 2003. He is the former team owner of Randy Humphrey Racing, which competed in the NASCAR Cup Series for one season in 2014, and a former co-owner of Phil Parsons Racing and TriStar Motorsports.

Humphrey has previously competed in the X-1R Pro Cup Series and the UARA STARS Late Model Series, as well as the later incarnations of the Dash Series, such as the IPOWER Dash Series and the ISCARS Dash Series.

== Motorsports results ==
=== NASCAR ===
(key) (Bold – Pole position awarded by qualifying time. Italics – Pole position earned by points standings or practice time. * – Most laps led.)

==== Goody's Dash Series ====
NASCAR Goody's Dash Series results
Year	Team	No.	Make	1	2	3	4	5	6	7	8	9	10	11	12	13	14	15	16	17	18	19	20	NGDS	Pts	Ref
1998	Randy Humphrey	98	Pontiac	DAY	HCY	CAR	CLT	TRI	LAN	BRI	SUM	GRE	ROU	SNM	MYB; 20	CON								34th	599	
1998	Randy Humphrey	93	Pontiac														HCY; 12	LAN; 15	STA	LOU	VOL	USA; 4	HOM; 24	34th	599	
1999	Randy Humphrey	93	Pontiac	DAY; 17	HCY; 17	CAR; 18	CLT; 11	BRI; 10	LOU; 12	SUM; 11	GRE; 21	ROU; 19	STA; 14	MYB; 25	HCY; 13	LAN; 10	USA; 27	JAC; 15	LAN; 11					11th	1857	
2000	Randy Humphrey	93	Pontiac	DAY; 7	MON; 21	STA; 12	JAC; 25	CAR; 23	CLT; 36	SBO; 15	ROU	LOU; 19	SUM; 15	GRE; 20	SNM; 15	MYB; 12	BRI	HCY; 14	JAC	USA; 15	LAN; 9			18th	1677	
2001	Randy Humphrey	93	Pontiac	DAY; 33	ROU	DAR	CLT	LOU	JAC	KEN	SBO; 6	DAY; 38	GRE; 25	SNM; 21	NRV; 20	MYB; 25	BRI	ACE; 10	JAC; 11	USA; 28				20th	1070	
2001	N/A	3	Toyota																		NSH; 26			20th	1070	
2002	Randy Humphrey	93	Pontiac	DAY; 25	HAR; 12	ROU; 6	LON; 11	CLT; 9	KEN; 25	MEM; 8	GRE; 9	SNM; 7	SBO; 12	MYB; 11	BRI; 18	MOT; 9	ATL; 2							8th	1821	
2003	Randy Humphrey	93	Pontiac	DAY; 9	OGL; 6	**CLT**; 9	SBO; 21	GRE; 5	KEN; 23	BRI; 6	ATL; 10													4th	1058	
