= Randy Humphrey Racing =

Former NASCAR team

- Owner: Randy Humphrey
- Base: Cornelius, North Carolina
- Series: Sprint Cup Series
- Race drivers: 77. Dave Blaney; Nelson Piquet Jr.; Joe Nemechek; Corey LaJoie
- Manufacturer: Ford

Career
- Debut: 2014 Duck Commander 500 (Texas)
- Latest race: 2014 Bank of America 500 (Charlotte)
- Races competed: 8
- Drivers' Championships: 0
- Race victories: 0
- Pole positions: 0

Randy Humphrey Racing was an auto racing team that competed in the NASCAR Sprint Cup Series. They fielded the No. 77 Ford Fusion for drivers Dave Blaney, Nelson Piquet Jr., Joe Nemechek, and Corey LaJoie.

== History ==
Owner Randy Humphrey was originally partnered with Phil Parsons, operating MSRP Motorsports in the Nationwide Series and HP Racing/Prism Motorsports in the Sprint Cup Series. Humphrey left the team in 2012, and partnered with TriStar/PME Engines owner Mark Smith to field a 19 and 91 car as Humphrey-Smith Racing, mostly as start and parks. The TriStar Cup team shut down before the Chase for the Cup in 2013.

=== 2014 ===
In January 2014, it was announced that Humphrey was forming his own team with veteran driver Dave Blaney and veteran crew chief Peter Sospenzo. The team purchased Fords from Germain Racing, which was switching to Chevrolet. The team ran car number 77, which Blaney had run with Jasper Motorsports, and acquired the 2013 owner points from the Humphrey Smith No. 19, although it was ranked too deeply to grant them a provisional in the first three races of 2014. The team's first race was to be the 2014 Daytona 500, but was involved in a multi-car crash in practice, totaling their only car and forcing them to withdraw from the race. The team entered in all of the first 15 races of the season with Blaney, only making four, and had a best finish of 33rd at Dover, 17 laps down. On June 25, prior to the race at Kentucky Speedway, team owner Randy Humphrey announced that the team would be "retooling" their program, citing a lack of performance and "people issues." The hiatus was initially announced as four weeks, planning to return at Indianapolis in June, though they would skip an additional race at Pocono.

Upon the team's return to competition at Watkins Glen International in August, Nationwide and Camping World Trucks winner Nelson Piquet Jr. was placed in the car with sponsorship from WORKS Yard Tools. Three weeks later, Joe Nemechek would qualify on speed at Atlanta. At Loudon in September, Richard Petty Motorsports development driver Corey LaJoie made his Sprint Cup debut, starting and finishing 41st, 102 laps down. LaJoie would make another start at Charlotte, in the Bank of America 500. The team shut down at the end of the season.

=== Car No. 77 results ===
NASCAR Sprint Cup Series results
Year	Driver	No.	Make	1	2	3	4	5	6	7	8	9	10	11	12	13	14	15	16	17	18	19	20	21	22	23	24	25	26	27	28	29	30	31	32	33	34	35	36	Owners	Pts
2014	Dave Blaney	77	Ford	DAY; Wth	PHO; DNQ	LVS; DNQ	BRI; DNQ	CAL; Wth	MAR; Wth	TEX; 41	DAR; 43	RCH; DNQ	TAL; DNQ	KAN; DNQ	CLT; DNQ	DOV; 33	POC; 43	MCH; Wth	SON	KEN	DAY	NHA	IND	POC																47th	53
2014	Nelson Piquet Jr.	77	Ford																						GLN; 26	MCH	BRI													47th	53
2014	Joe Nemechek	77	Ford																									ATL; 37	RCH	CHI										47th	53
2014	Corey LaJoie	77	Ford																												NHA; 41	DOV	KAN	CLT; 35	TAL	MAR	TEX	PHO	HOM	47th	53
