= 2014 FedEx 400 =

Race details
- Race 13 of 36 in the 2014 NASCAR Sprint Cup Series
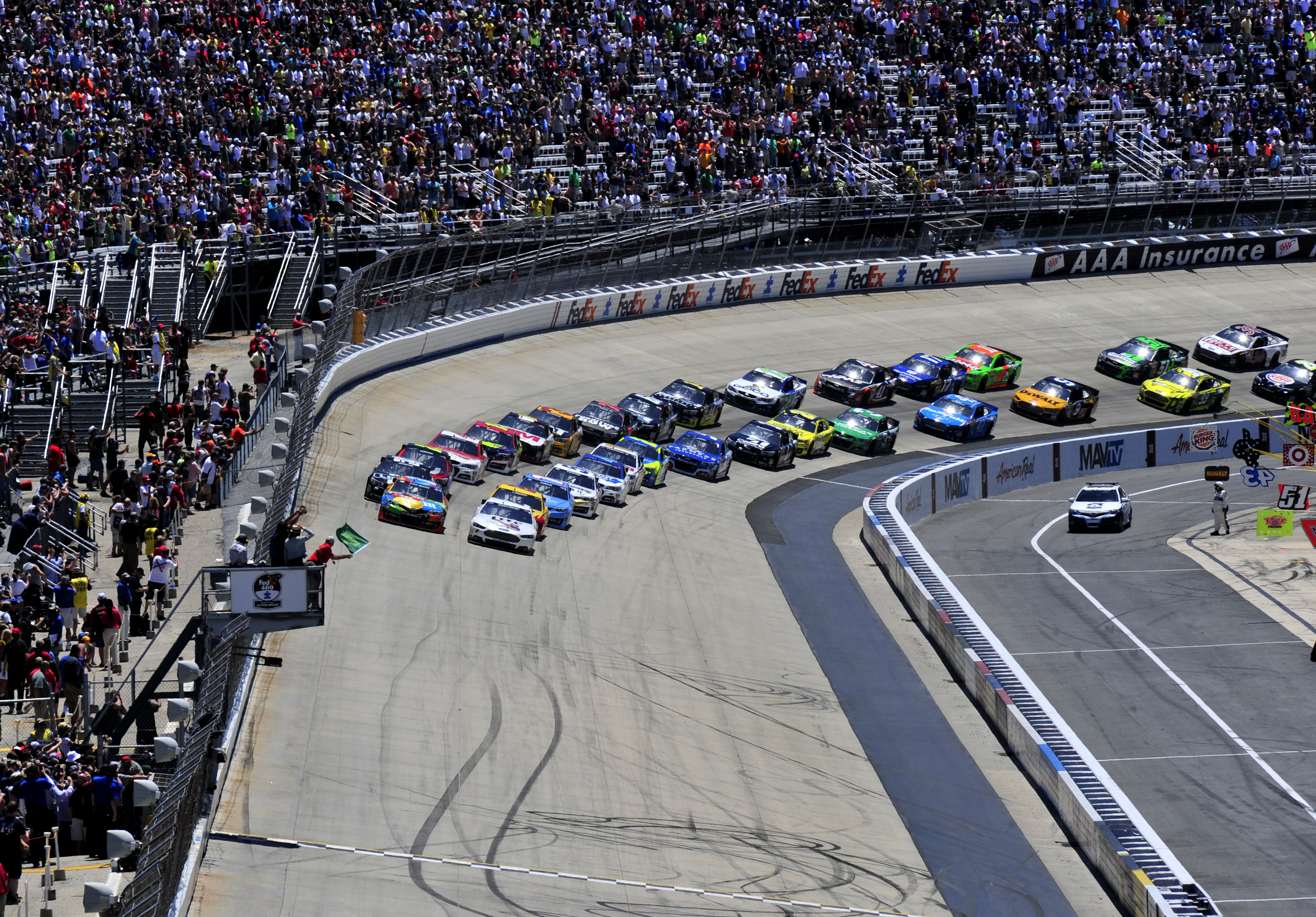
- The race under green flag
- Date: June 1, 2014
- Location: Dover International Speedway, Dover, Delaware
- Course: Permanent racing facility
- Course length: 1 miles (1.6 km)
- Distance: 400 laps, 400 mi (643.737 km)
- Weather: Sunny with a high temperature of 71 °F (22 °C); wind out of the East at 6 miles per hour (9.7 km/h).
- Average speed: 117.724 mph (189.458 km/h)

Pole position
Driver	Brad Keselowski	Team Penske
- Time: 21.892

Most laps led
Driver	Jimmie Johnson	Hendrick Motorsports
- Laps: 272

Winner
No. 48	Jimmie Johnson	Hendrick Motorsports

Television in the United States
- Network: Fox & MRN
- Announcers: Mike Joy, Darrell Waltrip and Larry McReynolds (Television); Joe Moore and Jeff Striegle (Booth); Mike Bagley (Backstretch) (Radio)
- Nielsen ratings: 3.5/9 (Final); 3.3/9 (Overnight); 5.4 Million viewers

The 2014 FedEx 400 benefiting Autism Speaks was a NASCAR Sprint Cup Series stock car race held on June 1, 2014, at Dover International Speedway in Dover, Delaware. Contested over 400 laps on the 1 mile (1.6 km) oval, it was the 13th race of the 2014 NASCAR Sprint Cup Series. Jimmie Johnson won the race, his second of the season and ninth at Dover, while Brad Keselowski finished second. Matt Kenseth, Clint Bowyer, and Denny Hamlin rounded out the top five. The top rookies of the race were Kyle Larson (11th), Austin Dillon (20th), and Brett Moffitt (22nd).

== Report ==
=== Entry list ===
The entry list for the FedEx 400 was released on Tuesday, May 27, 2014, at 9:37 a.m. Eastern time. Forty-three drivers were entered which meant no one failed to qualify.

No.	Driver	Team	Manufacturer
1	Jamie McMurray	Chip Ganassi Racing	Chevrolet
2	Brad Keselowski (PC2)	Team Penske	Ford
3	Austin Dillon (R)	Richard Childress Racing	Chevrolet
4	Kevin Harvick	Stewart–Haas Racing	Chevrolet
5	Kasey Kahne	Hendrick Motorsports	Chevrolet
7	Michael Annett (R)	Tommy Baldwin Racing	Chevrolet
9	Marcos Ambrose	Richard Petty Motorsports	Ford
10	Danica Patrick	Stewart–Haas Racing	Chevrolet
11	Denny Hamlin	Joe Gibbs Racing	Toyota
13	Casey Mears	Germain Racing	Chevrolet
14	Tony Stewart (PC3)	Stewart–Haas Racing	Chevrolet
15	Clint Bowyer	Michael Waltrip Racing	Toyota
16	Greg Biffle	Roush Fenway Racing	Ford
17	Ricky Stenhouse Jr.	Roush Fenway Racing	Ford
18	Kyle Busch	Joe Gibbs Racing	Toyota
20	Matt Kenseth (PC5)	Joe Gibbs Racing	Toyota
22	Joey Logano	Team Penske	Ford
23	Alex Bowman (R)	BK Racing	Toyota
24	Jeff Gordon (PC6)	Hendrick Motorsports	Chevrolet
26	Cole Whitt (R)	BK Racing	Toyota
27	Paul Menard	Richard Childress Racing	Chevrolet
31	Ryan Newman	Richard Childress Racing	Chevrolet
32	Blake Koch (i)	Go FAS Racing	Ford
33	David Stremme	Circle Sport	Chevrolet
34	David Ragan	Front Row Motorsports	Ford
36	Reed Sorenson	Tommy Baldwin Racing	Chevrolet
38	David Gilliland	Front Row Motorsports	Ford
40	Landon Cassill (i)	Circle Sport	Chevrolet
41	Kurt Busch (PC4)	Stewart–Haas Racing	Chevrolet
42	Kyle Larson (R)	Chip Ganassi Racing	Chevrolet
43	Aric Almirola	Richard Petty Motorsports	Ford
44	J. J. Yeley (i)	Xxxtreme Motorsports	Chevrolet
47	A. J. Allmendinger	JTG Daugherty Racing	Chevrolet
48	Jimmie Johnson (PC1)	Hendrick Motorsports	Chevrolet
51	Justin Allgaier (R)	HScott Motorsports	Chevrolet
55	Brian Vickers	Michael Waltrip Racing	Toyota
66	Brett Moffitt	Michael Waltrip Racing	Toyota
77	Dave Blaney	Randy Humphrey Racing	Ford
78	Martin Truex Jr.	Furniture Row Racing	Chevrolet
83	Ryan Truex (R)	BK Racing	Toyota
88	Dale Earnhardt Jr.	Hendrick Motorsports	Chevrolet
98	Josh Wise	Phil Parsons Racing	Chevrolet
99	Carl Edwards	Roush Fenway Racing	Ford
Official entry list

Key	Meaning
(R)	Rookie
(i)	Ineligible for points
(PC#)	Past champions provisional

== Practice ==
=== First practice ===
Kyle Busch was the fastest in first practice with a time of 21.648 and a speed of 166.297 mph (267.629 km/h).

Pos	No.	Driver	Team	Manufacturer	Time	Speed
1	18	Kyle Busch	Joe Gibbs Racing	Toyota	21.648	166.297
2	14	Tony Stewart	Stewart–Haas Racing	Chevrolet	21.738	165.609
3	42	Kyle Larson (R)	Chip Ganassi Racing	Chevrolet	21.794	165.183
Official first practice results

== Qualifying ==
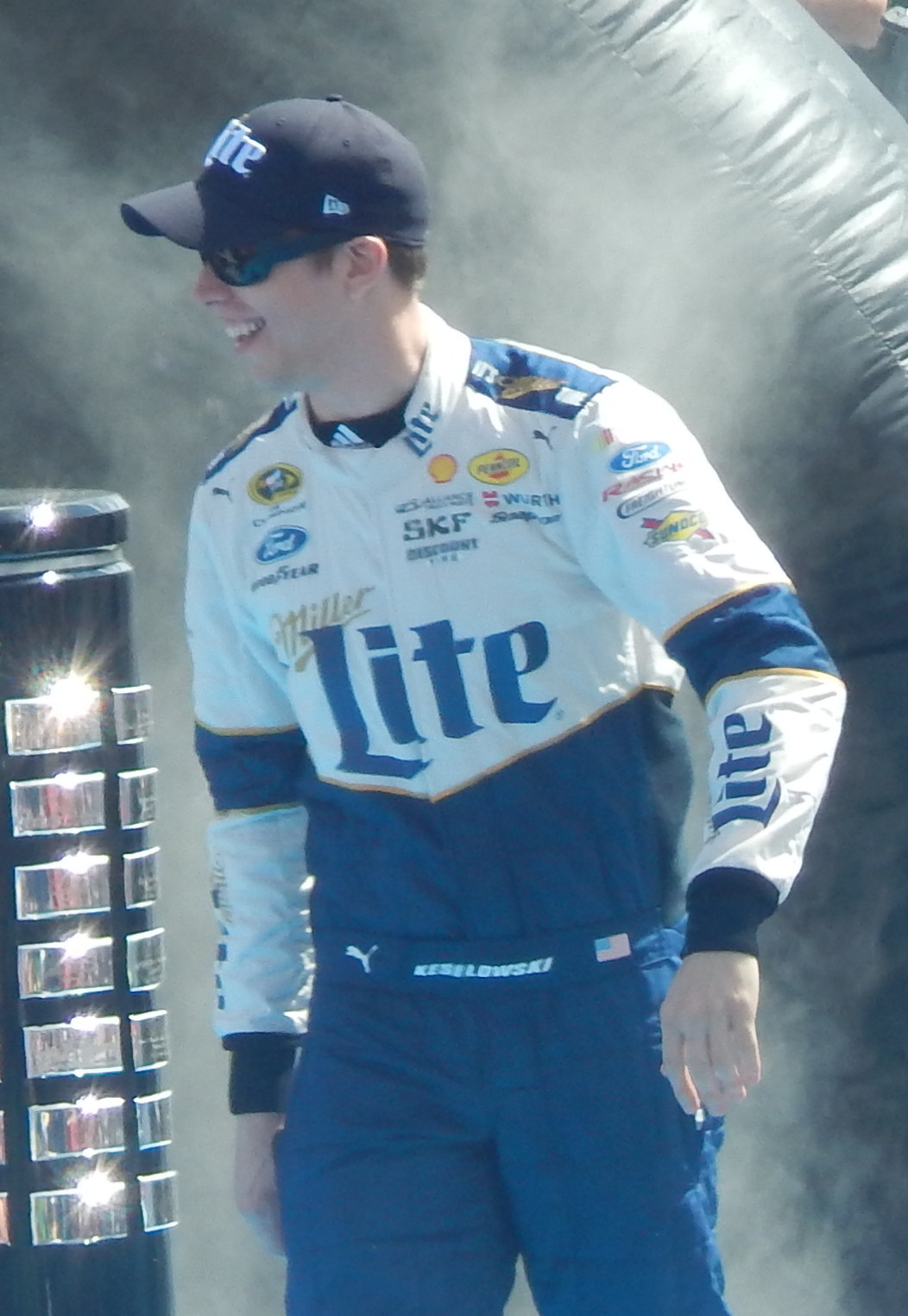
Brad Keselowski won the pole position, setting a new track record.

Brad Keselowski won the pole with a new track record time of 21.892 and a speed of 164.444 mph (264.647 km/h). After the session, Keselowski stated that his team "gave me a great car here", as he entered the weekend looking for a second win of 2014.

=== Qualifying results ===
Pos	No.	Driver	Team	Manufacturer	R1	R2
1	2	Brad Keselowski	Team Penske	Ford	21.991	21.892
2	18	Kyle Busch	Joe Gibbs Racing	Toyota	21.898	21.980
3	22	Joey Logano	Team Penske	Ford	21.973	21.993
4	48	Jimmie Johnson	Hendrick Motorsports	Chevrolet	21.958	22.037
5	42	Kyle Larson (R) (Note: Kyle Larson started from the rear after an engine change.)	Chip Ganassi Racing	Chevrolet	22.048	22.075
6	24	Jeff Gordon	Hendrick Motorsports	Chevrolet	21.985	22.077
7	11	Denny Hamlin	Joe Gibbs Racing	Toyota	21.983	22.077
8	4	Kevin Harvick	Stewart–Haas Racing	Chevrolet	22.052	22.154
9	55	Brian Vickers	Michael Waltrip Racing	Toyota	22.046	22.166
10	15	Clint Bowyer	Michael Waltrip Racing	Toyota	22.073	22.189
11	47	A. J. Allmendinger	JTG Daugherty Racing	Chevrolet	22.093	22.201
12	16	Greg Biffle	Roush Fenway Racing	Ford	22.082	22.361
13	88	Dale Earnhardt Jr.	Hendrick Motorsports	Chevrolet	22.095	—
14	31	Ryan Newman	Richard Childress Racing	Chevrolet	22.099	—
15	27	Paul Menard	Richard Childress Racing	Chevrolet	22.101	—
16	78	Martin Truex Jr.	Furniture Row Racing	Chevrolet	22.107	—
17	5	Kasey Kahne	Hendrick Motorsports	Chevrolet	22.128	—
18	66	Brett Moffitt	Identity Ventures Racing	Toyota	22.140	—
19	1	Jamie McMurray	Chip Ganassi Racing	Chevrolet	22.143	—
20	14	Tony Stewart	Stewart–Haas Racing	Chevrolet	22.147	—
21	20	Matt Kenseth	Joe Gibbs Racing	Toyota	22.149	—
22	13	Casey Mears	Germain Racing	Chevrolet	22.188	—
23	3	Austin Dillon (R)	Richard Childress Racing	Chevrolet	22.201	—
24	41	Kurt Busch	Stewart–Haas Racing	Chevrolet	22.221	—
25	43	Aric Almirola	Richard Petty Motorsports	Ford	22.256	—
26	17	Ricky Stenhouse Jr.	Roush Fenway Racing	Ford	22.257	—
27	9	Marcos Ambrose	Richard Petty Motorsports	Ford	22.260	—
28	10	Danica Patrick	Stewart–Haas Racing	Chevrolet	22.274	—
29	99	Carl Edwards	Roush Fenway Racing	Ford	22.281	—
30	51	Justin Allgaier (R)	HScott Motorsports	Chevrolet	22.376	—
31	26	Cole Whitt (R)	BK Racing	Toyota	22.417	—
32	38	David Gilliland	Front Row Motorsports	Ford	22.439	—
33	98	Josh Wise	Phil Parsons Racing	Chevrolet	22.471	—
34	34	David Ragan	Front Row Motorsports	Ford	22.582	—
35	23	Alex Bowman (R)	BK Racing	Toyota	22.586	—
36	40	Landon Cassill	Circle Sport	Chevrolet	22.613	—
37	44	J. J. Yeley	Xxxtreme Motorsports	Chevrolet	22.630	—
38	36	Reed Sorenson	Tommy Baldwin Racing	Chevrolet	22.635	—
39	7	Michael Annett (R)	Tommy Baldwin Racing	Chevrolet	22.637	—
40	33	David Stremme	Circle Sport	Chevrolet	22.703	—
41	83	Ryan Truex (R) (Note: Ryan Truex started from the rear for going to a backup car.)	BK Racing	Toyota	22.767	—
42	77	Dave Blaney	Randy Humphrey Racing	Ford	22.840	—
43	32	Blake Koch	Go FAS Racing	Ford	23.024	—
Qualifying Results

== Practice (post-qualifying) ==
=== Second practice ===
Brad Keselowski was also the fastest in the second practice session with a time of 22.542 and a speed of 159.702 mph (257.015 km/h).

Pos	No.	Driver	Team	Manufacturer	Time	Speed
1	2	Brad Keselowski	Team Penske	Ford	22.542	159.702
2	4	Kevin Harvick	Stewart–Haas Racing	Chevrolet	22.593	159.431
3	99	Carl Edwards	Roush Fenway Racing	Ford	22.662	158.856
Official second practice results

=== Final practice ===
Jimmie Johnson was the fastest in final practice with a time of 22.661 and a speed of 158.863 mph (255.665 km/h).

Pos	No.	Driver	Team	Manufacturer	Time	Speed
1	48	Jimmie Johnson	Hendrick Motorsports	Chevrolet	22.661	158.863
2	2	Brad Keselowski	Team Penske	Ford	22.746	158.270
3	31	Ryan Newman	Richard Childress Racing	Chevrolet	22.747	158.263
Official final practice results

== Race ==
=== First half ===
==== Start ====
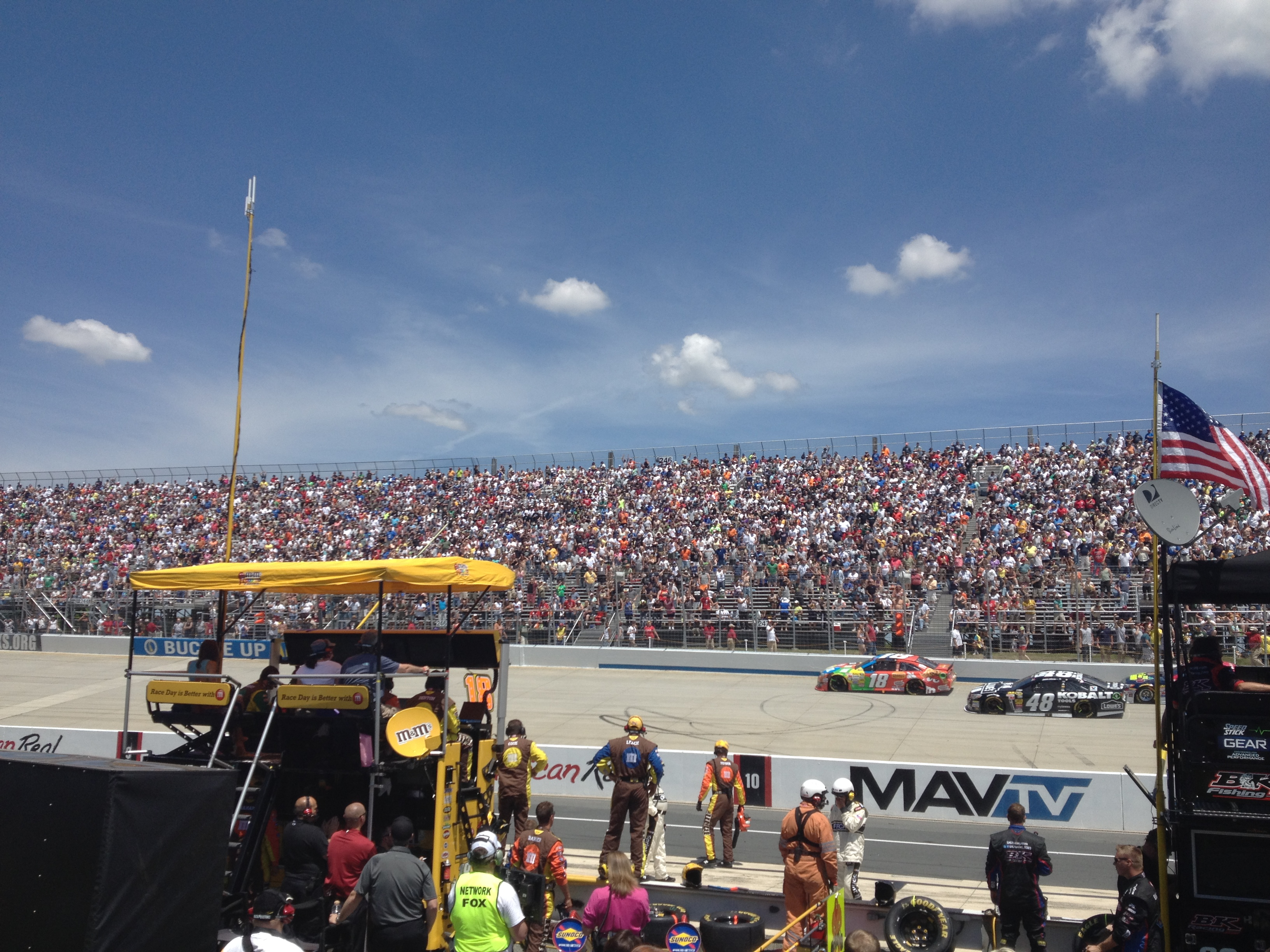
Kyle Busch leading the race following the restart from the first caution

The race began at 1:18 p.m local time. Kyle Larson had to start from the rear of the field due to an engine change. Kyle Busch led his 10,000th lap in Sprint Cup Series competition on lap 29, becoming the 15th driver to reach the milestone. Alex Bowman brushed the wall and brought out the first caution on lap 65. Following the pit stops, Denny Hamlin and David Ragan were both caught speeding on pit road. Kyle Busch led the first 81 laps but was passed by Jimmie Johnson for the lead. Coming off turn four, Clint Bowyer squeezed Busch into the wall on lap 124; Busch hit the wall in turn one and brought out the second caution of the race. He attempted to get back at Bowyer but his crew chief told him it was not Bowyer's fault. Bowyer later regarded the race as a "frustrating day", compromising his own race and Busch's race.

==== Trouble in turn two ====
Coming off turn two, A. J. Allmendinger came across Ricky Stenhouse Jr. and got loose. He collected Greg Biffle and both got loose. Biffle went into the wall tail-first, hit Stenhouse, and sent him into the outside wall and head first into the inside one on the backstretch. Landon Cassill and Ryan Truex also spun out in Turn 1. This brought out the third caution of the race. The race was then red-flagged, while Justin Allgaier also took damage when he was clipped in the side by Allmendinger. Kevin Harvick took the lead from Johnson on the restart while on lap 157, Jamie McMurray hit a piece on concrete in Turn 2, hit the wall in Turn 3 and brought out the fourth caution. This happened in a similar fashion to Jeff Gordon at Martinsville Speedway in 2004. NASCAR was forced to red flag the race for a second time to fix a hole in the track, while the concrete also damaged the glass covering the crossover bridge that crosses over the top of Turn 2. The race was suspended for 22 minutes, with Harvick holding the lead at the restart. However, just after the restart, Harvick had a tire go down and Matt Kenseth took the lead.

=== Second half ===
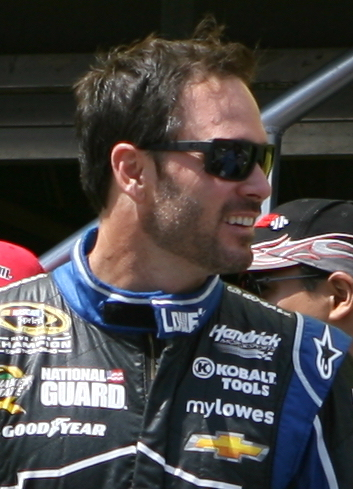
Jimmie Johnson won the race.

Johnson retook the lead on lap 178, and upon completing lap 215, he became the all-time leader in laps led at Dover. Bowman hit the wall for a third time in turn 1 and brought out the fifth caution on lap 222. J. J. Yeley brought out the sixth caution on lap 240 after blowing his engine, while debris brought out the seventh caution with forty laps to go. Casey Mears' right-rear tire came apart and the inner-liner rubber that came off the tire brought out the eighth caution with eight laps to go. Johnson held off a four lap charge by Brad Keselowski to take his second win of the season – successively, for the 13th time in his career – and 68th of his career. "It is incredible," Johnson said. "This race car was awesome. I just have so much to be thankful for. Chad (crew chief Knaus) told me I'd love the car, and sure enough, from the time we unloaded the car, he was right." Keselowski described his day as "up and down" and that his car did not progress as much as he had liked until the halfway mark of the race.

=== Race results ===
Pos	No.	Driver	Team	Manufacturer	Laps	Points
1	48	Jimmie Johnson	Hendrick Motorsports	Chevrolet	400	48
2	2	Brad Keselowski	Team Penske	Ford	400	43
3	20	Matt Kenseth	Joe Gibbs Racing	Toyota	400	42
4	15	Clint Bowyer	Michael Waltrip Racing	Toyota	400	41
5	11	Denny Hamlin	Joe Gibbs Racing	Toyota	400	39
6	78	Martin Truex Jr.	Furniture Row Racing	Chevrolet	400	38
7	14	Tony Stewart	Stewart–Haas Racing	Chevrolet	400	37
8	22	Joey Logano	Team Penske	Ford	400	36
9	88	Dale Earnhardt Jr.	Hendrick Motorsports	Chevrolet	400	35
10	27	Paul Menard	Richard Childress Racing	Chevrolet	400	34
11	42	Kyle Larson (R)	Chip Ganassi Racing	Chevrolet	400	33
12	43	Aric Almirola	Richard Petty Motorsports	Ford	400	32
13	1	Jamie McMurray	Chip Ganassi Racing	Chevrolet	400	31
14	99	Carl Edwards	Roush Fenway Racing	Ford	400	30
15	24	Jeff Gordon	Hendrick Motorsports	Chevrolet	400	29
16	9	Marcos Ambrose	Richard Petty Motorsports	Ford	400	28
17	4	Kevin Harvick	Stewart–Haas Racing	Chevrolet	399	28
18	41	Kurt Busch	Stewart–Haas Racing	Chevrolet	399	26
19	5	Kasey Kahne	Hendrick Motorsports	Chevrolet	399	25
20	3	Austin Dillon (R)	Richard Childress Racing	Chevrolet	398	24
21	47	A. J. Allmendinger	JTG Daugherty Racing	Chevrolet	397	23
22	66	Brett Moffitt	Identity Ventures Racing	Toyota	396	22
23	10	Danica Patrick	Stewart–Haas Racing	Chevrolet	396	21
24	36	Reed Sorenson	Tommy Baldwin Racing	Chevrolet	396	20
25	13	Casey Mears	Germain Racing	Chevrolet	395	19
26	51	Justin Allgaier (R)	HScott Motorsports	Chevrolet	395	18
27	26	Cole Whitt (R)	BK Racing	Toyota	394	17
28	98	Josh Wise	Phil Parsons Racing	Chevrolet	390	16
29	38	David Gilliland	Front Row Motorsports	Ford	388	15
30	32	Blake Koch	Go FAS Racing	Ford	388	0
31	31	Ryan Newman	Richard Childress Racing	Chevrolet	387	13
32	83	Ryan Truex (R)	BK Racing	Toyota	387	12
33	77	Dave Blaney	Randy Humphrey Racing	Ford	383	11
34	40	Landon Cassill	Circle Sport	Chevrolet	382	0
35	7	Michael Annett (R)	Tommy Baldwin Racing	Chevrolet	378	9
36	34	David Ragan	Front Row Motorsports	Ford	350	8
37	33	David Stremme	Circle Sport	Chevrolet	297	7
38	16	Greg Biffle	Roush Fenway Racing	Ford	292	6
39	44	J. J. Yeley	Xxxtreme Motorsports	Chevrolet	232	0
40	23	Alex Bowman (R)	BK Racing	Toyota	208	4
41	17	Ricky Stenhouse Jr.	Roush Fenway Racing	Ford	131	3
42	18	Kyle Busch	Joe Gibbs Racing	Toyota	125	3
43	55	Brian Vickers	Michael Waltrip Racing	Toyota	73	1
Race Results

=== Race statistics ===
- Lead changes: 18 among different drivers
- Cautions/Laps: 8 for 41
- Red flags: 2 for 29:01
- Time of race: 3 hours, 23 minutes and 52 seconds
- Average speed: 117.724 miles per hour (189.458 km/h)

== Media ==
=== Television ===
Fox Sports
Booth announcers	Pit reporters
Lap-by-lap: Mike Joy; Color-commentator: Larry McReynolds; Color commentator: Darrell Waltrip	Matt Yocum; Steve Byrnes; Krista Voda; Jeff Hammond

=== Radio ===
MRN Radio
Booth announcers	Turn announcers	Pit reporters
Lead announcer: Joe Moore; Announcer: Jeff Striegle	Backstretch: Mike Bagley	Winston Kelly; Steve Post; Alex Hayden; Woody Cain

== Standings after the race ==
Drivers' Championship standings

	Pos	Driver	Points
1	1	Matt Kenseth	463
1	2	Jeff Gordon	461 (−2)
1	3	Carl Edwards	438 (−25)
2	4	Jimmie Johnson	436 (−27)
	5	Dale Earnhardt Jr.	429 (−34)
1	6	Joey Logano	414 (−49)
4	7	Kyle Busch	411 (−52)
1	8	Brad Keselowski	404 (−59)
5	9	Denny Hamlin	379 (−84)
3	10	Kyle Larson (R)	377 (−86)
1	11	Ryan Newman	374 (−89)
	12	Kevin Harvick	373 (−90)
5	13	Brian Vickers	366 (−97)
2	14	Paul Menard	362 (−101)
	15	Austin Dillon (R)	358 (−105)
5	16	Greg Biffle	357 (−106)

Manufacturers' Championship standings

Pos	Manufacturer	Points
1	Chevrolet	585
2	Ford	558 (−27)
3	Toyota	528 (−57)

- Note: Only the first sixteen positions are included for the driver standings.

== Note ==
Previous race: 2014 Coca-Cola 600	Sprint Cup Series; 2014 season	Next race: 2014 Pocono 400
