= Wally Leatherwood =

American racing driver (born 1947)

- Nationality: American
- Born: April 8, 1947 (age 79) Waynesville, North Carolina, U.S.

NASCAR Goody's Dash Series career
- Debut season: 1996
- Years active: 1996–2001, 2003
- Starts: 30
- Championships: 0
- Wins: 0
- Poles: 0
- Best finish: 32nd in 2003
- Statistics up to date as of December 21, 2024.

Wally Leatherwood (born April 8, 1947) is an American former professional stock car racing driver who competed in the NASCAR Goody's Dash Series from 1996 to 2003.

Leatherwood has previously competed in the IPOWER Dash Series, the ISCARS Dash Touring Series, and the Frank Kimmel Street Stock Nationals Series.

== Motorsports results ==
=== NASCAR ===
(key) (Bold – Pole position awarded by qualifying time. Italics – Pole position earned by points standings or practice time. * – Most laps led.)

==== Goody's Dash Series ====
NASCAR Goody's Dash Series results
Year	Team	No.	Make	1	2	3	4	5	6	7	8	9	10	11	12	13	14	15	16	17	18	19	20	21	NGDS	Pts	Ref
1995	N/A	36	Chevy	DAY	FLO; 17	LAN; 27	MYB	SUM	HCY	CAR	STH	BRI	SUM	GRE	BGS	MYB	NSV	FLO	NWS	VOL	HCY	HOM; 12			42nd	321	
1996	N/A	36	Chevy	DAY	HOM; 12	MYB	SUM	NSV	TRI; 15	CAR; 20	HCY	FLO	BRI	SUM	GRE; 23	SNM	BGS	MYB	LAN	STH	FLO	NWS; 29	VOL	HCY	40th	518	
1997	N/A	3	Toyota	DAY	HOM; 26	KIN	MYB	LAN	CAR	TRI	FLO														35th	564	
1997	N/A	36	Pontiac									HCY; 12	BRI	GRE; 18	SNM	CLT; 24	MYB	LAN	SUM	STA	HCY; DNQ	USA	CON; 28	HOM	35th	564	
1998	N/A	36	Pontiac	DAY; DNQ	HCY	CAR	CLT; 18	TRI; 21	LAN	BRI; DNQ	SUM	GRE	ROU	SNM	MYB	CON; 19	HCY; DNQ	LAN	STA	LOU; 14	VOL	USA	HOM		36th	568	
1999	N/A	36	Pontiac	DAY; 15	HCY	CAR	CLT; 9	BRI; 27	LOU	SUM	GRE; 29	ROU	STA	MYB	HCY	LAN; 25	USA	JAC	LAN						36th	502	
2000	N/A	36	Pontiac	DAY	MON	STA	JAC	CAR	CLT; 25	SBO	ROU	LOU	SUM	GRE; DNQ	SNM	MYB	BRI; 19	HCY	JAC	USA	LAN				44th	264	
2001	N/A	36	Pontiac	DAY	ROU	DAR	CLT	LOU	JAC	KEN; 16	SBO	DAY	GRE	SNM	NRV	MYB	BRI	ACE	JAC	USA	NSH; 13				52nd	239	
2003	N/A	62	Pontiac	DAY; 33	OGL				KEN; 15	BRI															32nd	349	
2003	N/A	42	Pontiac			CLT; 37	SBO	GRE																	32nd	349	
2003	N/A	36	Pontiac								ATL; 16														32nd	349	
