= Michael Watt =

Michael or Mike Watt may refer to:

- Michael Watt (physician) (1887–1967), New Zealand doctor and public health administrator
- Michael Watt (footballer) (born 1970), Scottish former footballer
- Michael Watt (field hockey) (born 1987), Irish field hockey player
- Michael Watt (philanthropist) (born 1940), New Zealand entrepreneur, philanthropist, and investor
- Mike Watt (born 1957), American bass guitarist, singer and songwriter
- Mike Watt (ice hockey) (born 1976), Canadian ice hockey player
- Mike Watt (sport shooter) (1936–2015), New Zealand sport shooter
- Michael Watt (badminton) (born 1964), Northern Irish badminton player
- Mike Watt, a fictional character in the British sitcom Spaced (see List of characters in Spaced)
- Mike Watt (Neighbours), a fictional character on the Australian soap opera Neighbours

== See also ==
- Michael Watts (disambiguation)
