= Frank Watt =

Frank or Francis Watt may refer to:

- Frank Watt (baseball) (1902–1956), American baseball pitcher (Philadelphia Phillies)
- Frank Watt (footballer) (1866–?), Scottish international footballer (Queen's Park and Rangers)
- Frank Watt (football manager) (fl. 1895–1935), secretary of Newcastle United FC
- Frank Watt (politician) (1896–1971), Scottish Unionist MP for Edinburgh Central
