= Jonathan Watt =

English cricketer

Personal information
- Full name: Jonathan Watt
- Born: 11 September 1937 (age 89); Eastbourne, Sussex, England
- Batting: Right-handed
- Bowling: Right-arm off break

Career statistics
Competition	First-class
Matches	2
Runs scored	69
Batting average	23.00
100s/50s	–/–
Top score	34
Catches/stumpings	1/–
- Source: Cricinfo, 24 June 2019

Jonathan Watt (born 11 September 1937) is a former English first-class cricketer.

Born at Eastbourne, Watt made two appearances in first-class cricket match for L. C. Stevens' XI against Cambridge University at Eastbourne in 1960 and 1961. He scored 69 runs across his two matches, with a high score 34.
