= Mike Watts (racing driver) =

American racing driver (born 1956)

- Born: October 18, 1956 (age 70); Davidson, North Carolina, U.S.

NASCAR O'Reilly Auto Parts Series career
- 8 races run over 4 years
- Best finish: 51st (1983)
- First race: 1982 Mello Yello 300 (Charlotte)
- Last race: 1985 Goody's 300 (Daytona)
Wins	Top tens	Poles
0	0	0
- Statistics up to date as of December 19, 2024.

Mike Watts (born October 18, 1956) is an American former professional stock car racing driver who has competed in the NASCAR Busch Series and the NASCAR Goody's Dash Series.

Watts has also previously competed in the Southeast Limited Late Model Series Challenger Division, the Rolling Thunder Modifieds Series, the DIRTcar Nationals, the IPOWER Dash Series and the ISCARS Dash Series.

== Motorsports results ==
=== NASCAR ===
(key) (Bold - Pole position awarded by qualifying time. Italics - Pole position earned by points standings or practice time. * – Most laps led.)

==== Busch Grand National Series ====
NASCAR Busch Grand National Series results
Year	Team	No.	Make	1	2	3	4	5	6	7	8	9	10	11	12	13	14	15	16	17	18	19	20	21	22	23	24	25	26	27	28	29	30	31	32	33	34	35	NBGNSC	Pts	Ref
1982	Watts Racing	41	Pontiac	DAY	RCH	BRI	MAR	DAR	HCY	SBO	CRW	RCH	LGY	DOV	HCY	CLT; 35	ASH	HCY	SBO	CAR	CRW	SBO	HCY	LGY	IRP	BRI	HCY	RCH	MAR	CLT	HCY	MAR							175th	58	
1983	Watts Racing	86	Pontiac	DAY; 23	RCH	CAR; 27	HCY	MAR	NWS	SBO	GPS	LGY	DOV; 22	BRI	CLT; 19	SBO	HCY	ROU	SBO	ROU	CRW	ROU	SBO	HCY	LGY	IRP	GPS	BRI	HCY	DAR; 18	RCH	NWS	SBO	MAR	ROU	CLT	HCY	MAR	51st	488	
1984	Watts Racing	25	Pontiac	DAY	RCH	CAR	HCY	MAR	DAR	ROU	NSV	LGY	MLW	DOV	CLT	SBO	HCY	ROU	SBO	ROU	HCY	IRP	LGY	SBO	BRI	DAR; 11	RCH	NWS	CLT	HCY	CAR	MAR							74th	130	
1985	Watts Racing	25	Pontiac	DAY; 34	CAR	HCY	BRI	MAR	DAR	SBO	LGY	DOV	CLT	SBO	HCY	ROU	IRP	SBO	LGY	HCY	MLW	BRI	DAR	RCH	NWS	ROU	CLT	HCY	CAR	MAR									93rd	61	
