= Allan Watt =

Scottish sprinter (1921–2014)

Allan Watt (22 June 1921 – 7 May 2014) was a Scottish sprinter who represented Scotland and Great Britain in international competition.

== Athletics career ==
=== Junior ===
Watt was born on 22 June 1921. In 1939, Watt won the AAA Junior Championships 100 yards in 10 seconds (record) and the long jump with a distance of 6.78 metres at the White City Stadium in London. He also won the 100 yards and the long jump at the 1939 Scottish junior championships. At the 1940 Scottish junior championships he won the 100 yards, 220 yards and the long jump.

=== War service ===
In 1941 he joined the British Army, serving with the Royal Army Ordnance Corps. Watt gained a commission with the Royal Artillery (Field), attaining the rank of staff captain. At the end of the war he was working in welfare and education in Kenya. Following his demobilisation in 1946, he returned to training for his athletics career.

=== Senior ===
At the British Games at White City in 1947 he was second to the American, Eddy Connell, in the 100 yards. Connell set a new record of 9.6 seconds, with Watt running 9.85 seconds. In June 1947 at the Scottish Athletics Championships at Hampden Park, he won the 100 yards in 10 seconds and the 220 yards in 22.5 seconds. Watt was a member of the Shettleston Harriers running club in Glasgow.

Later that year he competed at Meadowbank Stadium in Edinburgh in an England/Wales and Scotland/Ireland competition. He was second to McDonald Bailey in the 100 yards and fourth in the 220 yards. Watt was selected for Great Britain at a meet in Antwerp, finishing second to McDonald Bailey in the 100 metres and second to Britain's John Fairgrieve in the 200 metres.

In 1948 he won the 100 yards at the Scottish Championships, and was second to D. D. MacKenzie in the 220 yards. Watt was runner-up in the 100 metres at the International Match in White City representing Scotland, and also ran at the British Championships. That summer he was a member of the Great Britain 4 × 400 metres relay team at the 1948 Summer Olympics.

== Businessman ==
Following his retirement from athletics he became a director of the family department store, Watt Brothers, on Sauchiehall Street in Glasgow.

== Death ==
Watt died on 7 May 2014, at the age of 92.
