= College of Idaho =

Private liberal arts college in Caldwell, Idaho, US

The College of Idaho
- Former names: Albertson College of Idaho (1991–2007)
- Motto: Rex Lex Dux Lux
- Motto in English: My Leader, my Light, my King, and my Law
- Type: Private liberal arts college
- Established: 1891, 135 years ago
- Academic affiliations: APCU; CIC; Space-grant
- Endowment: US$111 million
- President: David Douglass
- CEO: Doug Brigham
- Administrative staff: 282
- Students: 1,085 (Fall 2024)
- Location: Caldwell, Idaho, United States; 43.653°N 116.676°W
- Campus: Suburban, park, 55 acres (22 ha)
- Colors: Purple & Gold
- Nickname: Coyotes ("Yotes")
- Sporting affiliations: NAIA – CCC (primary); NAIA – Frontier (football)
- Mascot: Coyote
- Website: collegeofidaho.edu
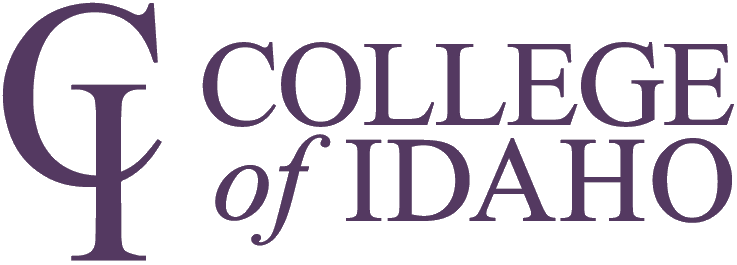

The College of Idaho, abbreviated C of I, is a private liberal arts college in Caldwell, Idaho. Founded in 1891 by William Judson Boone as a Presbyterian college, it is the state's oldest private liberal arts college and has an enrollment of over 1,000 students.

The college offers 30 undergraduate programs to earn a B.A., with select programs offering the opportunity to earn either a B.A. or a B.S. degree. The college also offers 4 graduate degrees in the fields of Sports Administration, Medical Science, Physician Assistant Studies, and Education. While previously utilizing the "PEAK" curriculum, in which students could earn one major and three minors in the span of four years, starting in the 2025-2026 academic year, the college began using the "Do More in Four" curriculum, in which students only have to attend classes for four days a week, with four, four credit classes per semester (as compared to the standard five, three credit classes), and the opportunity to earn an undergraduate and graduate degree in four years.

The college's alumni include eight Rhodes Scholars, three governors, four professional football players, and one professional baseball player.

== History ==
The college was conceived in 1884 when the Presbyterian Church's Wood River Presbytery, meeting in Shoshone, formed a commission to examine the possibility of establishing a Presbyterian college somewhere in the Idaho Territory. The commission found support for such a venture and in 1890 the Presbytery accepted an offer from a group of Caldwell citizens led by William Judson Boone, to locate the institution in that community.

The college was founded 135 years ago in 1891 by William Judson Boone with the support of the Wood River Presbytery. The college first opened its doors to students on October 7, 1891. Nineteen students showed up at The College of Idaho for the first classes in 1891. The first classes were held downtown in the Caldwell Presbyterian Church. A year later the college moved into its own downtown building before moving to its present site on the east side of town in 1910 when Henry and Carrie Blatchley donated 20 acres (8.1 ha) of land. Sterry Hall, a classroom and administration building, and Finney Hall, the first residence hall, were built that year. Two years later Voorhees residence hall was built, which would be the second of five total residents halls.

In 1893, it was incorporated under the laws of the state of Idaho and placed in the hands of a self-perpetuating board of trustees. Boone served as president of the college for 45 years until his death in 1936.

In 1991, the college's board of trustees unanimously voted to change its name to Albertson College of Idaho to honor alumnus and long-time donor Joe Albertson (1906–1993) and his wife Kathryn (1908–2002). The couple, who founded one of the country's largest supermarket chains, Albertson's Inc., met in a chemistry class at C of I and were generous benefactors of the college. At the time of the name change, the enrollment was 640 students.

On October 10, 2007, college president Bob Hoover announced that the name would revert to The College of Idaho, with the mutual agreement of the J.A. and Kathryn Albertson Foundation, to promote acceptance and gain financial backing from alumni who were unhappy about the original name change. This coincided with a $50 million donation by the foundation to the college.

== Academics ==
The college offers 30 undergraduate majors, 28 undergraduate minors, four graduate programs, and a variety of collaborative programs through 17 departments. Popular majors include business, biomedical sciences, psychology, and exercise science.

Academic rankings

Baccalaureate
- Washington Monthly: 80

Regional
- U.S. News & World Report: 4

The college has been accredited by the Northwest Commission on Colleges and Universities or its predecessor since 1922. Its teacher education program has been approved by the Idaho State Department of Education since 1913 and its graduates are eligible for certification in all states participating in the Interstate Certification Compact. The college is accepted by, and the alumnae are eligible for, membership in the American Association of University Women (AAUW).

=== Collaborative programs ===
Collaborative programs between The College of Idaho and other institutions offer degrees from both with students spending three to four years at C of I and two to three years at the cooperating university.

Collaborative programs in health professions include: nursing, clinical lab science, speech and language pathology and audiology, physical therapy, occupational therapy, pharmacy, pharmaceutical science and public health.

Other collaborative programs include engineering and law.

=== Curriculum ===
==== PEAK (2010-2025) ====
PEAK was the college's unique undergraduate curriculum. It was intended to allow students to graduate with an academic major and three minors in four years or two majors and two minors if they choose. The curriculum was implemented in the fall of 2010. It was made up of four different peaks: humanities & fine arts, social sciences & history, natural sciences & mathematics, and professional foundations & enhancement. Each student under this curriculum is required to major in one of the four peaks, while minoring in the other three allowing a broad base of study with limited general education requirements.

==== Do More in Four (2025-present) ====
Due to economic hardship in the mid-2000s, and the effects of the COVID-19 pandemic, there was a 15% decrease in college students in 2025. In addition, the rising costs of inflation (up to 19.1%) and financial hardship by the college, the increasing trend by students and belief by the Northwest Commission on Colleges and Universities that it is better to graduate in three years rather than four, and the decreasing trust in higher education (70% in 2014 v. 36% in 2024), the college found it necessary to revamp their curriculum in order to involve with the changing economical, political, and educational climates.

As the result of discussion with donors, the college's board, faculty, and students, the "Do More in Four" curriculum was introduced. This curriculum differs wildly from the previous PEAK curriculum, as it requires more general education classes in what is called "Coyote Core." This curriculum emphasizes a four-day school week, from Monday through Thursday, where Fridays should be utilized for meetings with professors, internships, and college athletics; four 4-credit classes per semester rather than the previous five 3-credit classes per semester; and, the possibility, in select fields, of completing both a Bachelor's and Master's degree in the span of four years, while retaining undergraduate scholarships and grants.

== Student life ==
The college has more than 50 student clubs and organizations, with an active student government, the Associated Students of The College of Idaho (ASCI) emphasize diversity in cultures, and strong intramural and club sports programs. Intramural sports include: basketball, soccer, softball, rugby, volleyball and flag football.

The college's Outdoor Program takes advantage of Idaho's geography and include backpacking, hiking, fly fishing, camping, winter camping, snowshoeing, kayaking, rafting, rock climbing, backcountry skiing, inner tubing, and stargazing. The Outdoor Program leads week-long trips during the breaks between terms and after midterms.

The college has one fraternity (Sigma Chi) and two sororities (Kappa Alpha Theta and Kappa Kappa Gamma), but has historically had more.

== Athletics ==
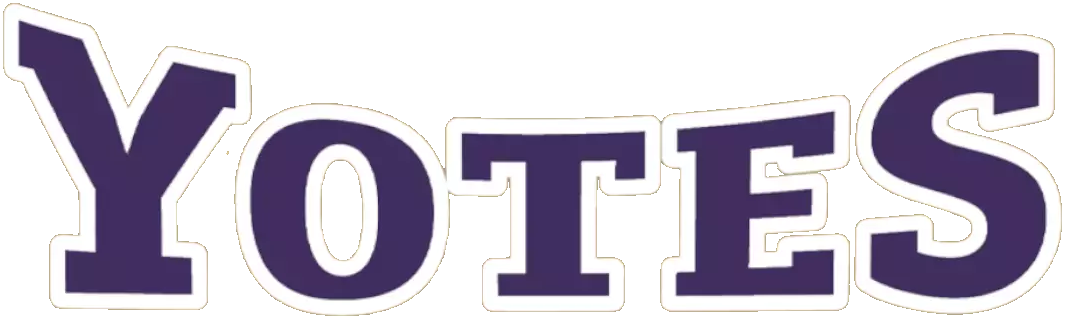
C o I athletics wordmark

The College of Idaho athletic teams are called the Coyotes (or Yotes). The college is a member of the National Association of Intercollegiate Athletics (NAIA), primarily competing in the Cascade Collegiate Conference (CCC) for most of its sports since the 1993–94 academic year; while its football team competes in the Frontier Conference, its men's lacrosse team competes in the Pacific Northwest Collegiate Lacrosse League (PNCLL), its men's and women's skiing competes in the Northwest Collegiate Ski Conference (NWCSC) of the United States Collegiate Ski and Snowboard Association (USCSA), and its competitive swimming team competes as an Independent.

CofI competes in 20 intercollegiate varsity sports: Men's sports include baseball, basketball, cross country, football, golf, lacrosse, skiing, soccer, swimming & diving and track & field; while women's sports include basketball, cross country, golf, skiing, soccer, softball, swimming & diving, tennis, track & field and volleyball.

=== Football ===
In 2014, The College of Idaho re-instated its football program after a 37-year hiatus. The program is led by head coach Mike Moroski, who has posted a record of 53-38 since taking over the program and was voted the 2019 Frontier Conference Coach of the Year. From 2019 to 2022, the Yotes have posted a record of 29–7 and have won a at least a share of the Frontier Conference each year. The Yotes even posted their longest winning streak in school history from 2018 to 2019 (17 games). Even so, the Yotes have only reached the NAIA playoffs once in those four years (2019). In 2019, the Yotes posted their best record of 11–1 and achieved their highest rank in program history at #5 in the NAIA postseason poll. Since 2014, the Yotes have had a total of 8 All-Americans, 56 all-conference selections, and 26 NAIA All-Academic selections. In 2022, the Yotes split the conference title with rival Carroll College and finished the season ranked 18th in the nation after posting an 8–2 record.

=== Mascot ===
The Coyote is the school's mascot, and CofI teams are often referred to as the "Yotes."

=== Accomplishments ===
Since 2011, CofI student-athletes have won 23 national championships. The men's and women's ski teams have won 48 individual and team national championships while competing in the NWCSC of the USCSA. The college's track and cross country teams have won 13 individual and relay national titles. The men's baseball team has qualified for postseason play every year since 1987, winning the NAIA national championship in 1998. The men's basketball team won the 1996 NAIA Division II national championship. In 2014, the CofI football team ranked No. 2 in the NAIA for attendance with more than 4,500 fans per game. The men's lacrosse team has also won back to back PNCLL D II conference championships, in 2018 and 2019.

All 19 of the College of Idaho's NAIA teams were honored as NAIA Scholar Team for 2008–2009 season. Each team maintained an average GPA of at least 3.0. This set an all-time NAIA record for number of Scholar Teams in one season. CofI student-athletes continue to earn high marks in the class room and are among the annual leaders in scholar-athlete and academic All-America honorees.

During 2019–2021, the College of Idaho football team won three straight Frontier Conference championships in the NAIA. This includes the unprecedented "COVID" season in the spring of 2021 where the "Yotes" played just four games.

In 2023, the College of Idaho's men's basketball team, under head coach Colby Blaine, won its second NAIA national championship, defeating Indiana Tech 73–71 in Kansas City, Missouri. The 2022–2023 team went 36–1 and 22–0 in Cascade Conference play, winning 36 straight games after losing its opening game of the season to Arizona Christian. In Fall 2023, the women's cross country team won its first national championship and the first NAIA women's team national championship in school history. Head coach Dominic Bolin was named the 2023 NAIA Women's Cross Country Coach of the Year. It was just the second year of Bolin's head coaching tenure.

=== National Championships ===
Sport	Association	Division	Year	Runner-up	Score
Baseball	NAIA	Single	1998	Indiana Tech	6–3
Men's Basketball	NAIA	Single	2025	Oklahoma Wesleyan	93-65
Men's Basketball	NAIA	Single	2023	Indiana Tech	73-71
Men's Basketball	NAIA	Division II	1996	Whitworth	81-72 (OT)
Women's Cross Country	NAIA	Single	2023	The Master's University (CA)	68 points

== Orma J. Smith Museum of Natural History ==
The College of Idaho houses the Orma J. Smith Museum of Natural History in William Judson Boone Science Hall. It is the only natural history museum for southwestern Idaho, southeastern Oregon, and northern Nevada. The natural history museum serves three main purposes: to support the educational programs at The College of Idaho, to provide a resource to the community, and to house resources for scientific research.

Orma J. Smith taught chemistry, zoology, and geology in the early 1900s. A small museum was established in the 1930s to house his collections but was closed in 1963. It was reopened in 1976 in the basement of Boone Hall, driven by the need to house collections from the College of Idaho expeditions led by Robert Bratz and the current director, William H. Clark.

Since the ‘70s, the museum has been staffed primarily by volunteers, many the College of Idaho alums, and students. The first Saturday is dedicated to Museum Workdays, where the museum is open for work with Museum staff. A monthly education seminar takes place at noon on Workdays.

The museum is a repository for some very large regional collections.

The students in the Gipson Honors Program utilize the museum every year for a first semester project, writing research papers which are supposed to offer a unique perspective on one item in the extensive collections.

== The Whittenberger Planetarium ==
The College of Idaho houses the Whittenberger Planetarium in the William Judson Boone Science Hall. The planetarium was built in 1970 and provides educational programming to student groups and the public.

== Archives ==
The personal papers of Robert E. Smylie and the legislative papers of former senator Steve Symms are located at the college. The Steunenberg Papers, detailing Idaho's Trial of the Century, were recently donated to the Archives.

Idaho's Gem and Mineral Collection is located at the Orma J. Smith Natural History Museum at the college.

== Community involvement ==
Jewett Auditorium hosts the Caldwell Fine Arts Series which was founded in 1961 as a co-operative effort between the college and community leaders to present cultural events. The performances sponsored by the Caldwell Fine Arts Series have included a wide variety of disciplines: solo artists, chamber music, orchestra, theater, opera, ballet, ethnic dance and jazz. Jewett Auditorium was built to house a three manual pipe organ. The interior of the auditorium seats 850 people. The building was completed in 1962.

== Campus ==
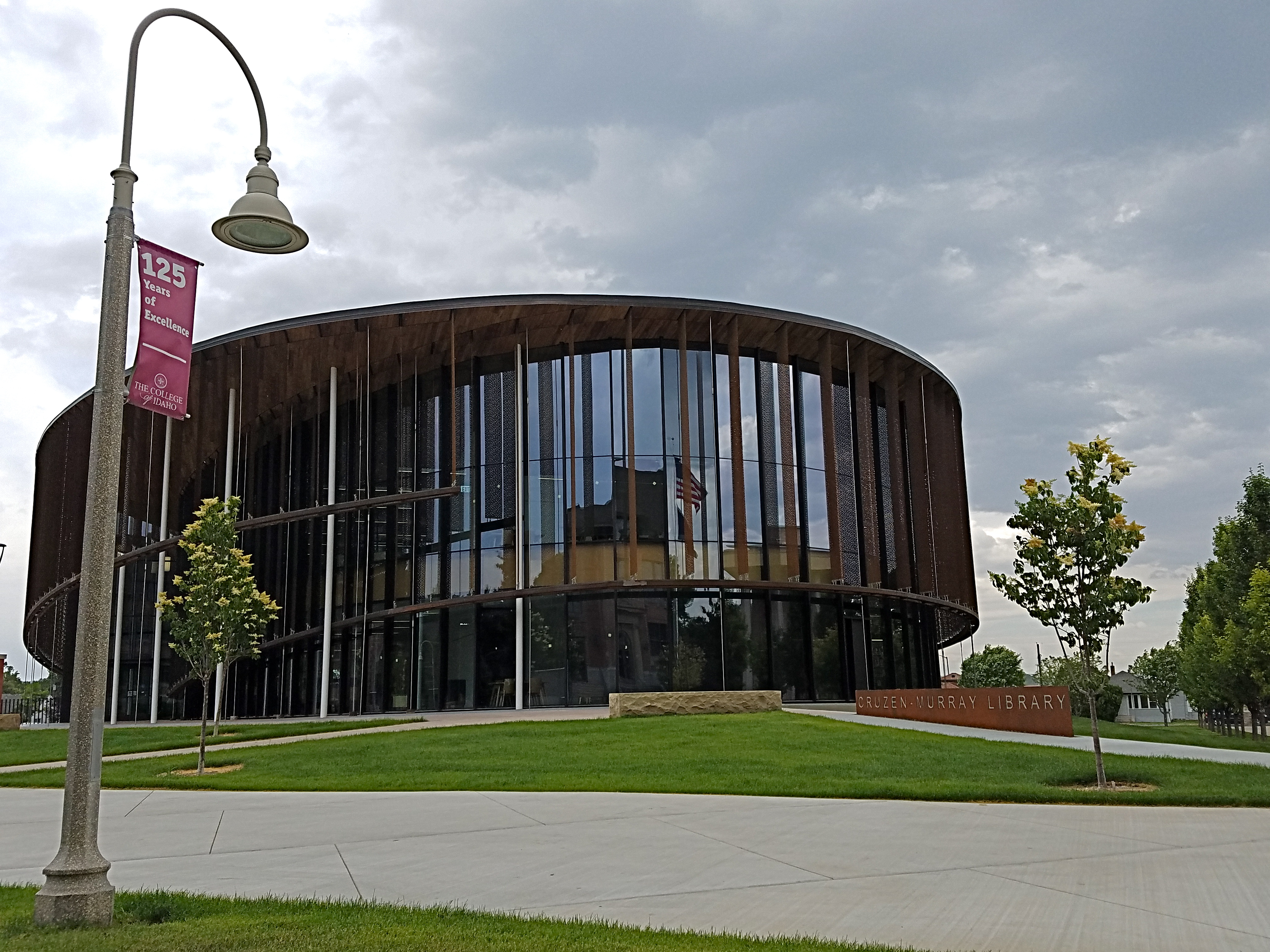
Cruzen-Murray Library

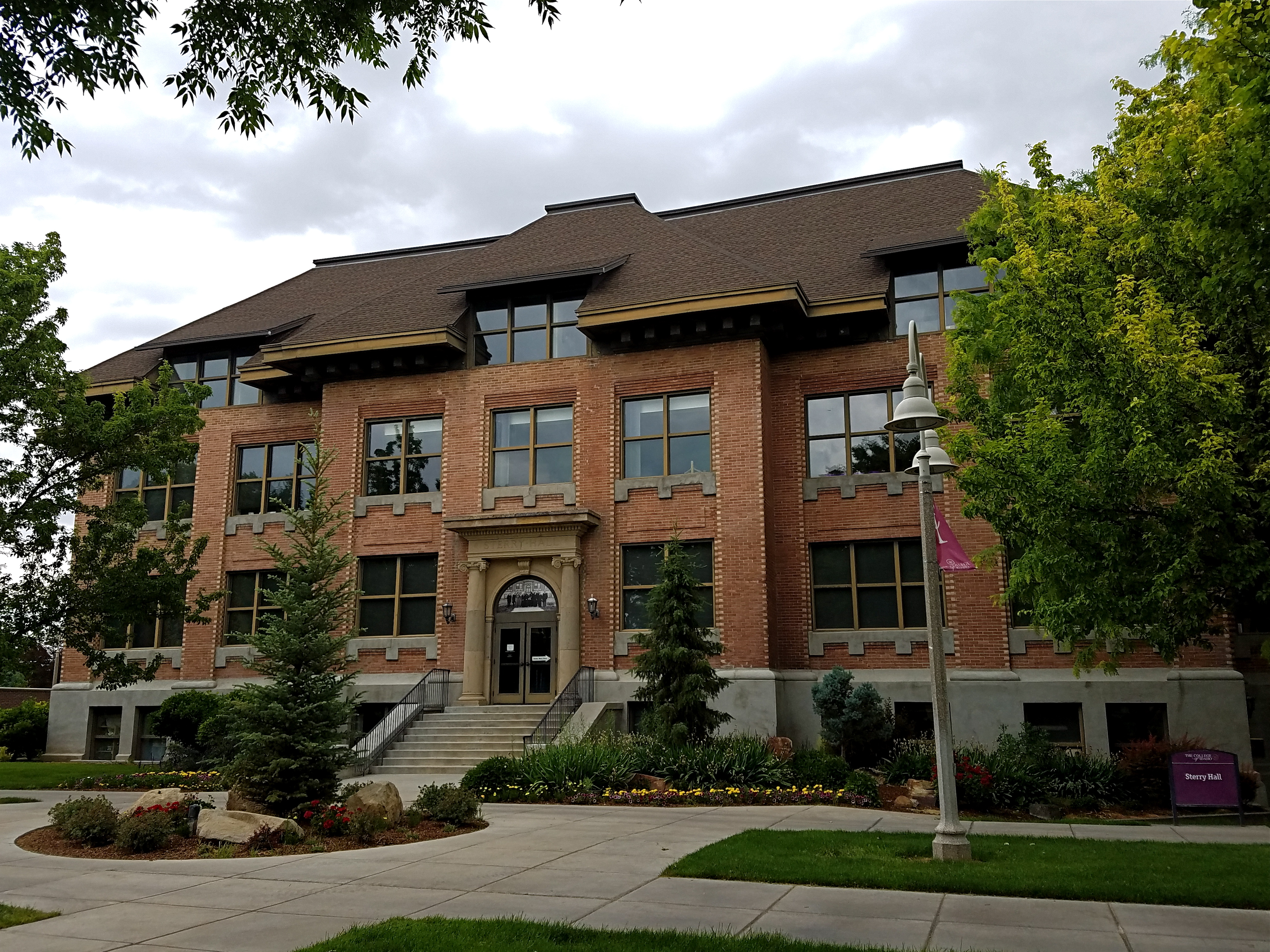
Sterry Hall was the first building built on campus

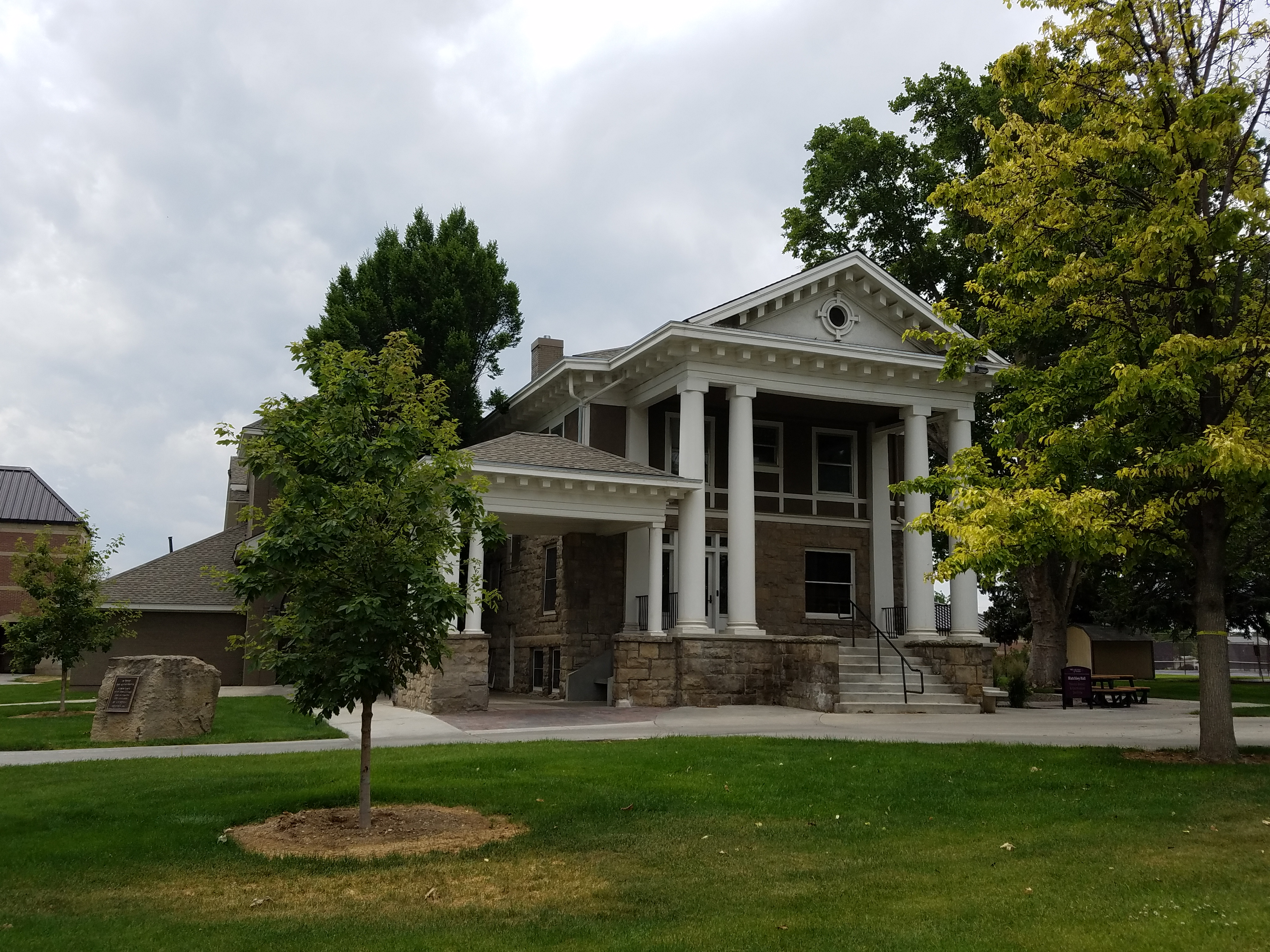
Blatchley Hall

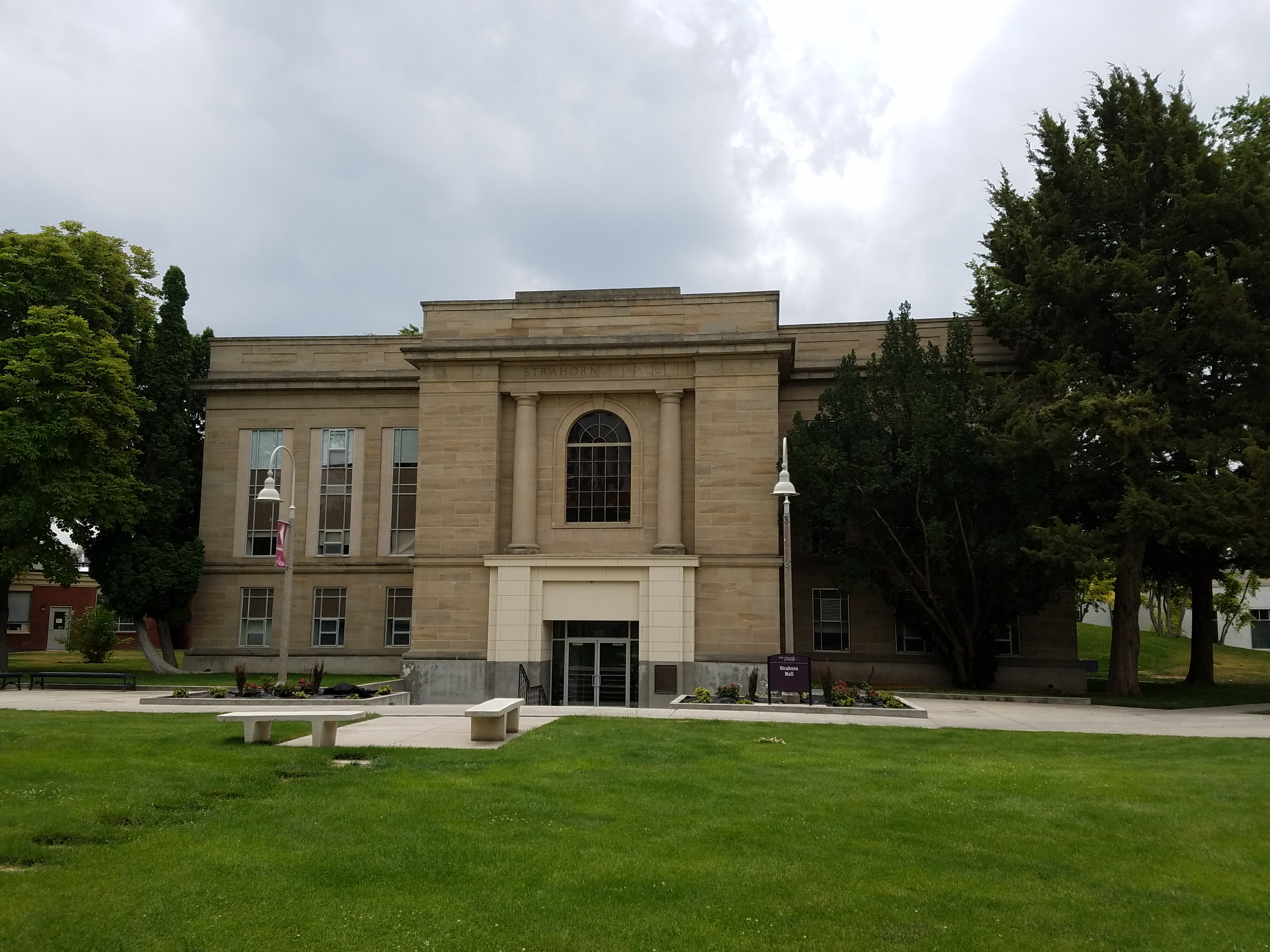
Strahorn Hall was the first library built on campus.

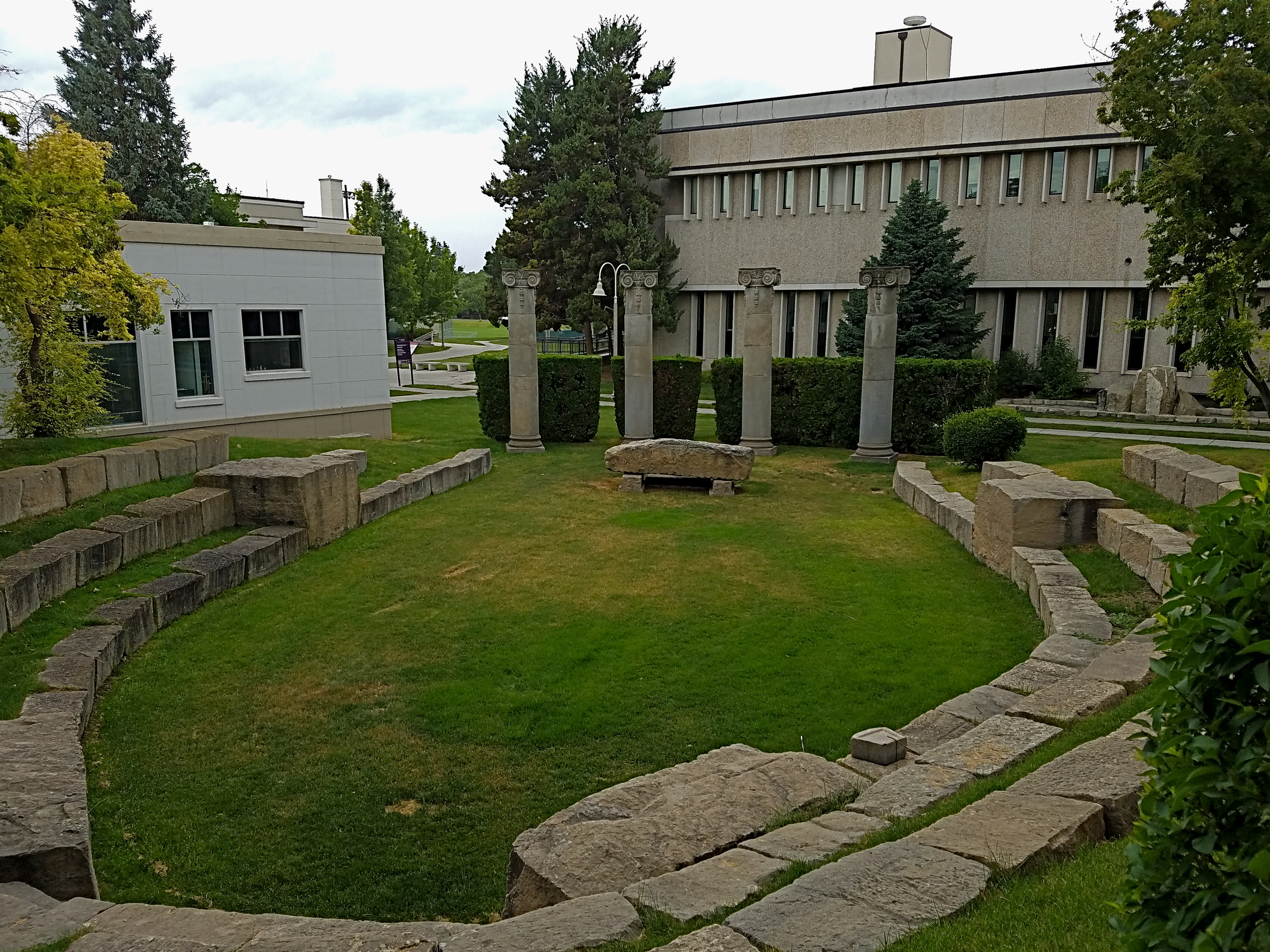
The Centennial Amphitheater

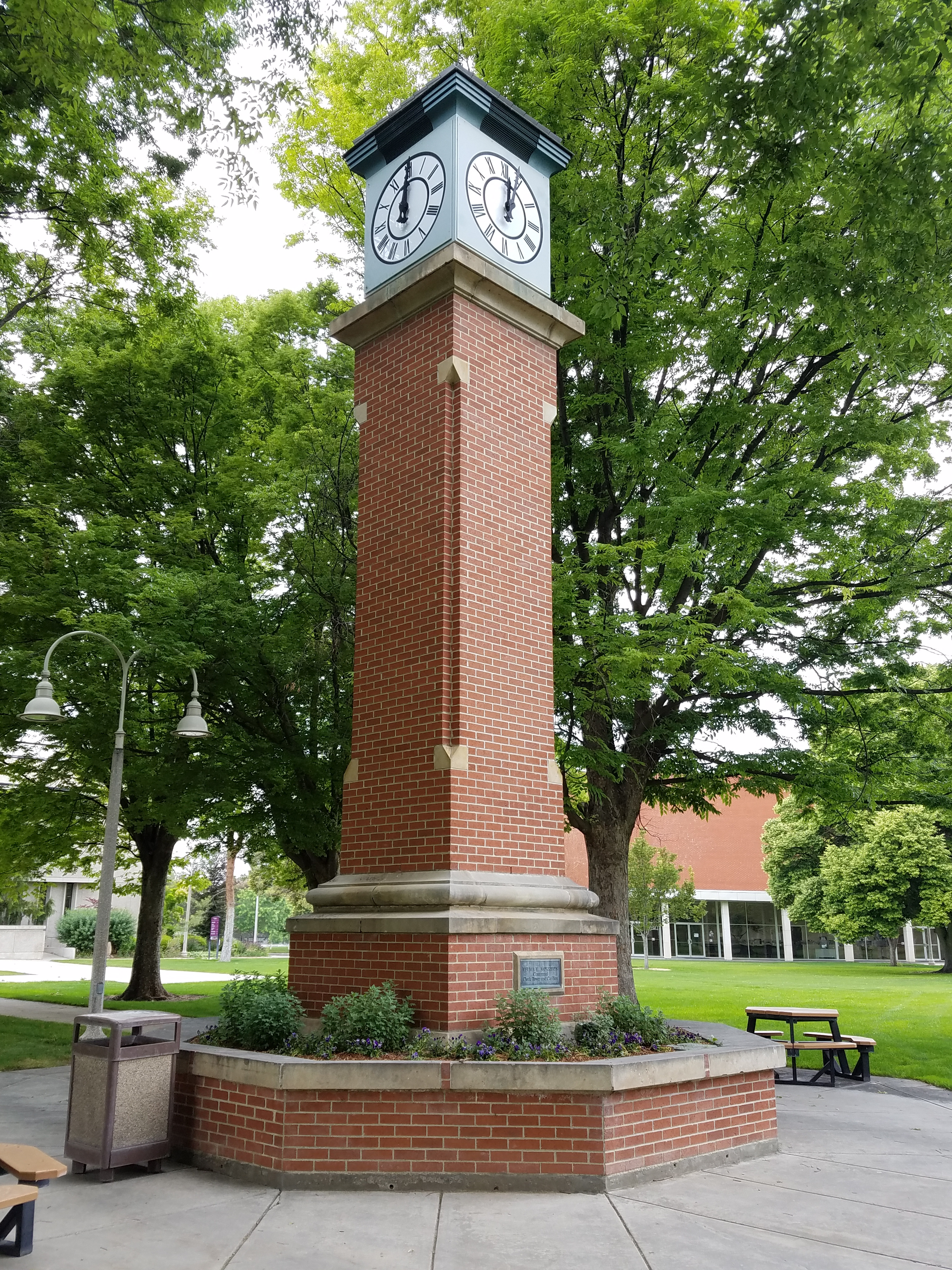
Morrison Centennial Clocktower

== Notable alumni ==
- Joe Albertson, founder of Albertson's supermarkets and philanthropist
- Kathryn Albertson, wife of the founder of the Albertsons chain of grocery stores; philanthropist and founder of local sorority Sigma Epsilon
- Elgin Baylor, Basketball Hall of Fame inductee
- Mary Becker, former Mayor of Juneau Alaska
- Andy Benoit, sports journalist; covers the NFL for Sports Illustrated
- George Blankley, college football and basketball coach
- Hamer H. Budge, former Congressman and Chair of the Securities and Exchange Commission
- Cary Coglianese, University of Pennsylvania Law School faculty leader and author
- Dorothy Custer, comedian
- Duane Elgin, American author, speaker, educator, consultant, and media activist
- Christopher Farnsworth, novelist
- Horton Corwin Hinshaw, Nobel Prize nominee, pulmonologist
- Ravic Huso, former US Ambassador to Laos
- Warren Jones, justice of the Idaho Supreme Court
- Edward Lodge, former US District Judge
- Larry Lujack, Chicago radio host
- Cynthia Meyer, justice of the Idaho Supreme Court
- Riley O'Brien, Major League Baseball pitcher
- Butch Otter, 32nd governor of Idaho (2007 to 2019)
- R.C. Owens, NFL wide receiver for the San Francisco 49ers, Baltimore Colts, and New York Giants
- Alison Rabe, attorney and member of the Idaho Senate
- Diane Raptosh, author, poet and educator
- Forest Rohwer, microbial ecologist and Biology Professor at San Diego State University
- Klaus Scharioth, former German ambassador to the United States
- Gerald Schroeder, former chief justice of the Idaho Supreme Court
- Mary Shaw Shorb, research scientist, invented first method to assay Vitamin B-12
- Jason Simontacchi, Major League Baseball Pitcher
- Elmo Smith, 27th governor of Oregon (1956 to 1957)
- Paul Smith, Academy Award-winning composer
- Robert Smylie, 24th governor of Idaho (1955 to 1967)
- Melinda Smyser, former State Senator, former Director of the Idaho Department of Labor, Director of the Idaho Office of Drug Policy
- Scott Syme, former member of the Idaho House of Representatives (2016-2022)
- Pat Takasugi, former Idaho State Representative (2008-2011)
- Ted Trueblood, outdoor writer and conservationist, former Fishing Editor for Field & Stream magazine
- Kristine Tompkins, former CEO of Patagonia and founder of Conservacion Patagonica
- Chuck Winder, former member of the Idaho State Legislature (2008 to 2024)
- Julie Yamamoto, former state Representative (2020 - 2024)
