= Brian Scott =

American racing driver (born 1988)

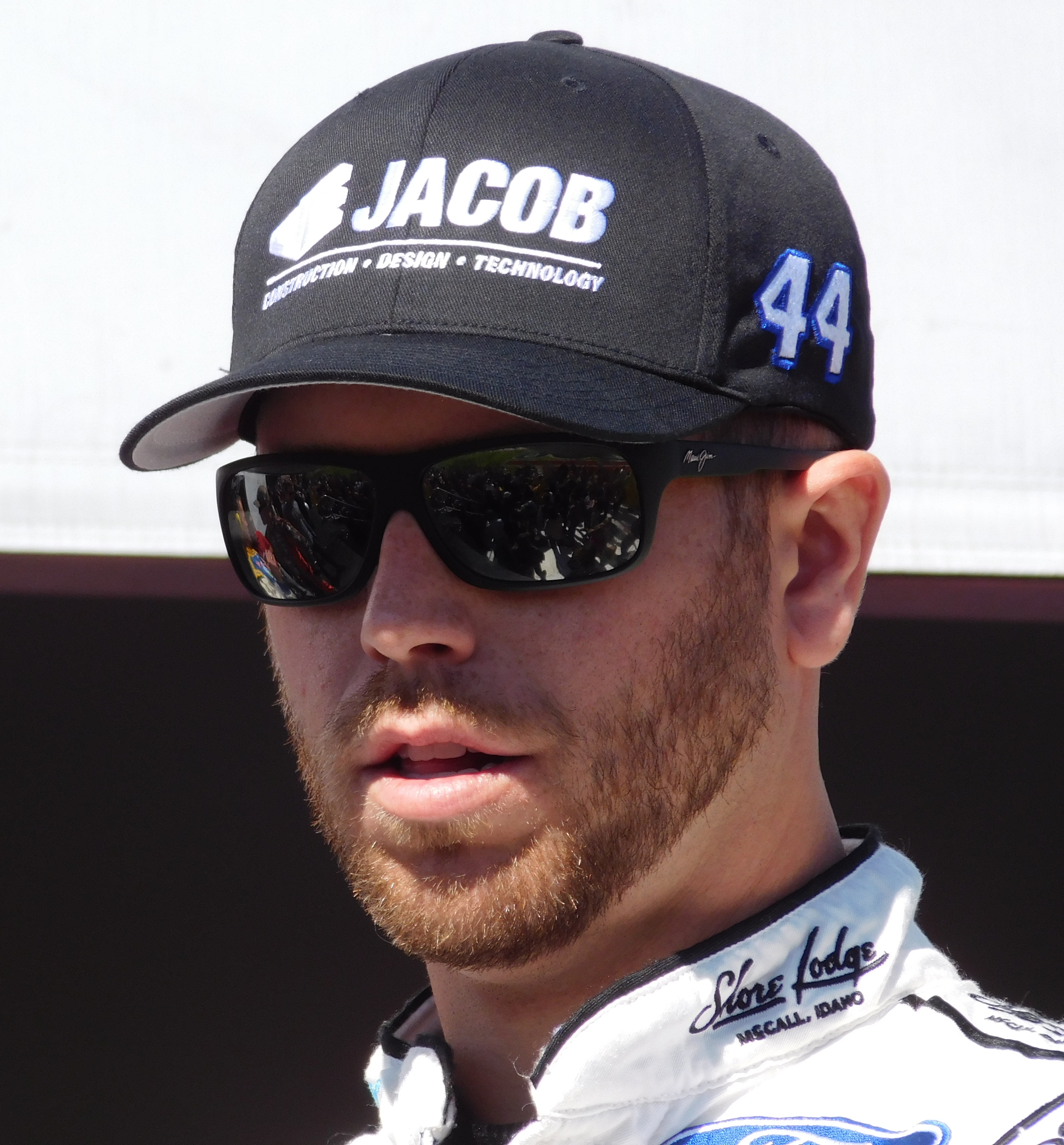
- Scott at Charlotte Motor Speedway in 2016
- Born: Brian Joseph Scott; January 12, 1988 (age 38); Boise, Idaho, U.S.

NASCAR Cup Series career
- 53 races run over 4 years
- 2016 position: 31st
- Best finish: 31st (2016)
- First race: 2013 Bank of America 500 (Charlotte)
- Last race: 2016 Ford EcoBoost 400 (Homestead)
Wins	Top tens	Poles
0	1	1

NASCAR O'Reilly Auto Parts Series career
- 210 races run over 8 years
- 2017 position: 43rd
- Best finish: 4th (2014)
- First race: 2009 Nashville 300 (Nashville)
- Last race: 2017 VisitMyrtleBeach.com 300 (Kentucky)
Wins	Top tens	Poles
0	79	5

NASCAR FedEx Freight Truck Series career
- 62 races run over 4 years
- 2012 position: 78th
- Best finish: 7th (2009)
- First race: 2007 New Hampshire 200 (New Hampshire)
- Last race: 2012 Lucas Oil 150 (Phoenix)
- First win: 2009 AAA Insurance 200 (Dover)
- Last win: 2012 Lucas Oil 150 (Phoenix)
Wins	Top tens	Poles
2	23	0
- Statistics up to date as of January 19, 2019.

Brian Joseph Scott (born January 12, 1988) is an American former professional stock car racing driver.

== Racing career ==
=== Beginnings ===
Scott began racing competitively at the age of twelve. One of his early career highlights came at the 360 Nationals at Skagit Speedway in Alger, Washington, when he competed against an elite field of dirt racers and brought home an impressive second-place finish. He recently was the first Idaho native to make a debut at the Daytona 500.

=== NASCAR ===
==== Camping World Truck Series ====
While splitting time between USAR and Late Models, Scott's father, JB, announced he had purchased the NASCAR Camping World Truck Series team Xpress Motorsports. Scott then made his NASCAR debut at the Smith's Las Vegas 350 and in 2008 moved to the Trucks full-time to run for and eventually finish second for the Rookie of the Year. Albertsons became the team's new sponsor and after a change to Toyota they end the year strong with five top-tens in the last seven races, including a second-place finish at the season-ending Ford 200. He went on to finish out his Truck resume with a win in the 2009 AAA Insurance 200 at Dover International Speedway, twenty top-tens, nine top-fives, and several runner up finishes. On November 9, 2012, Scott added his second win in the NASCAR Camping World Truck Series at Phoenix International Raceway in the Lucas Oil 150 and delivered Kyle Busch Motorsports their second win of the season.

==== Xfinity Series ====
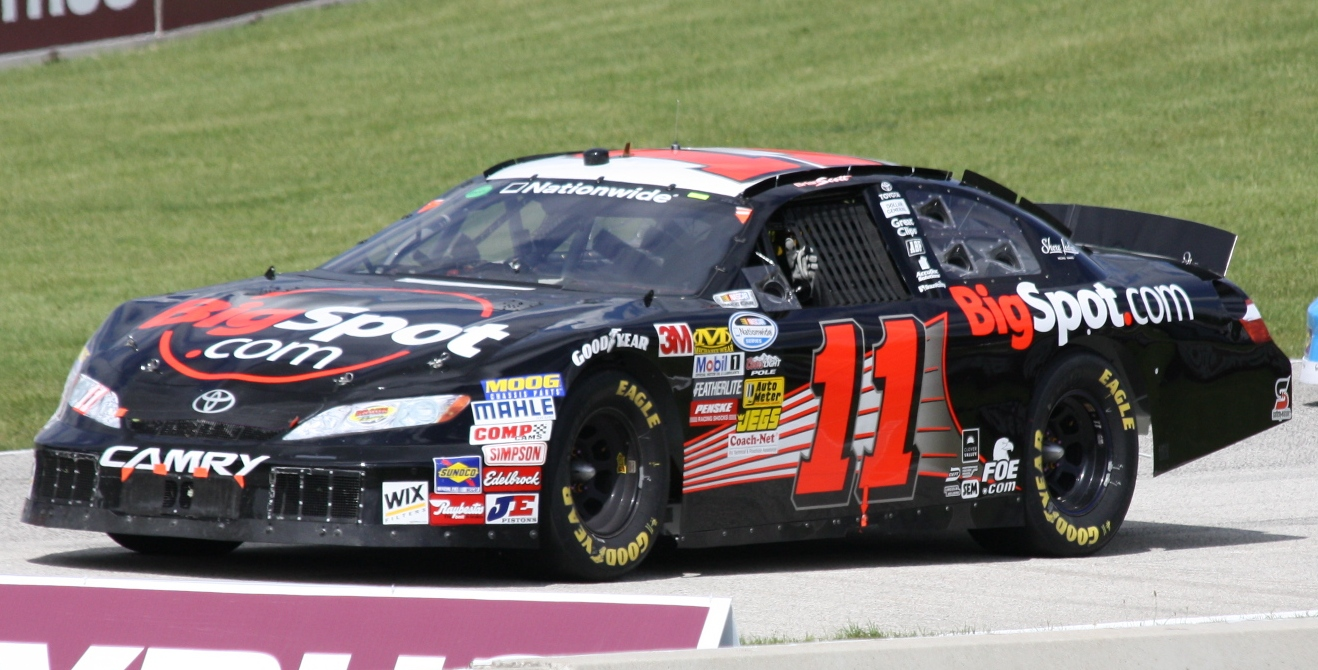
Scott's 2010 Nationwide car for Braun Racing

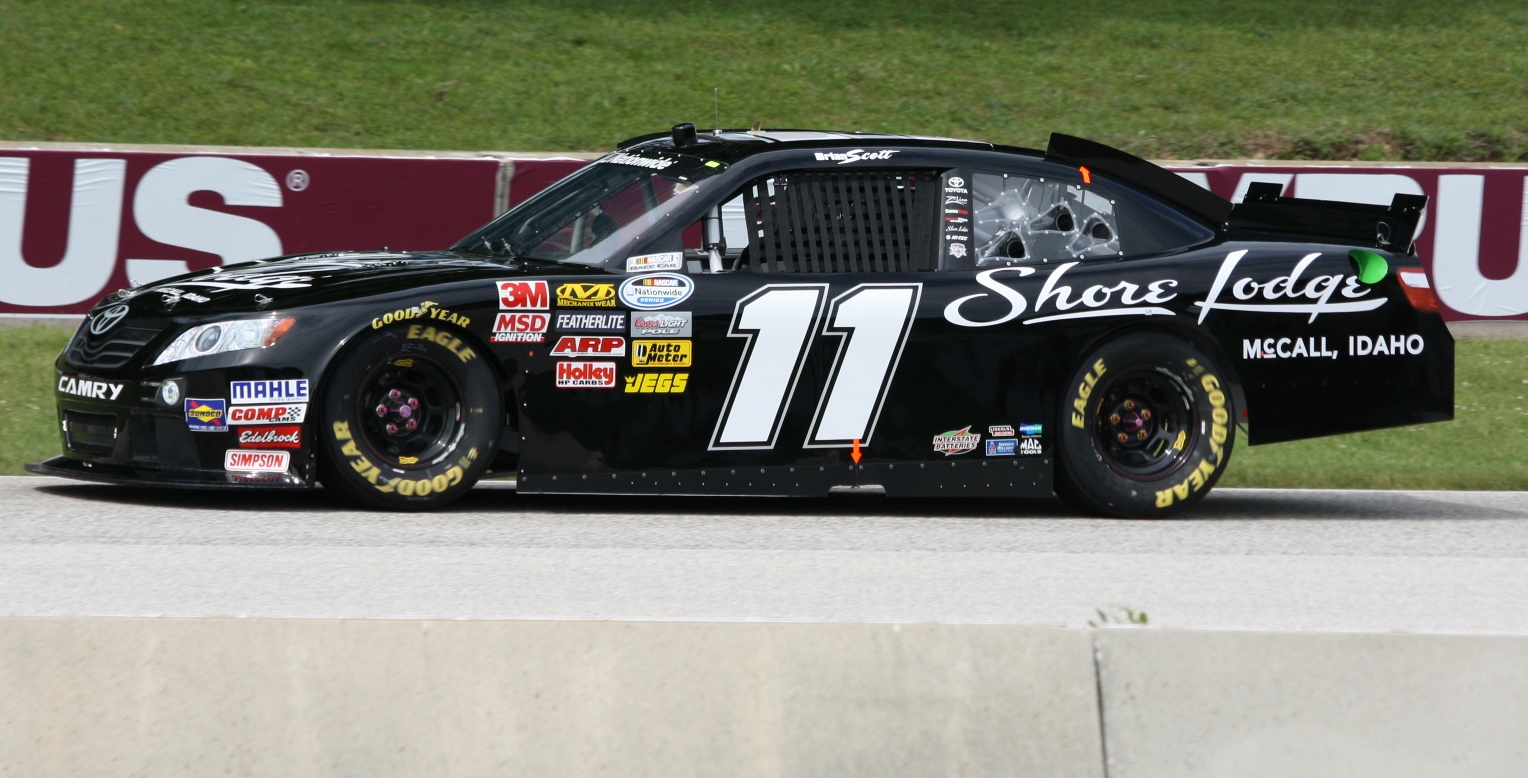
Scott's 2011 Nationwide car for Joe Gibbs Racing

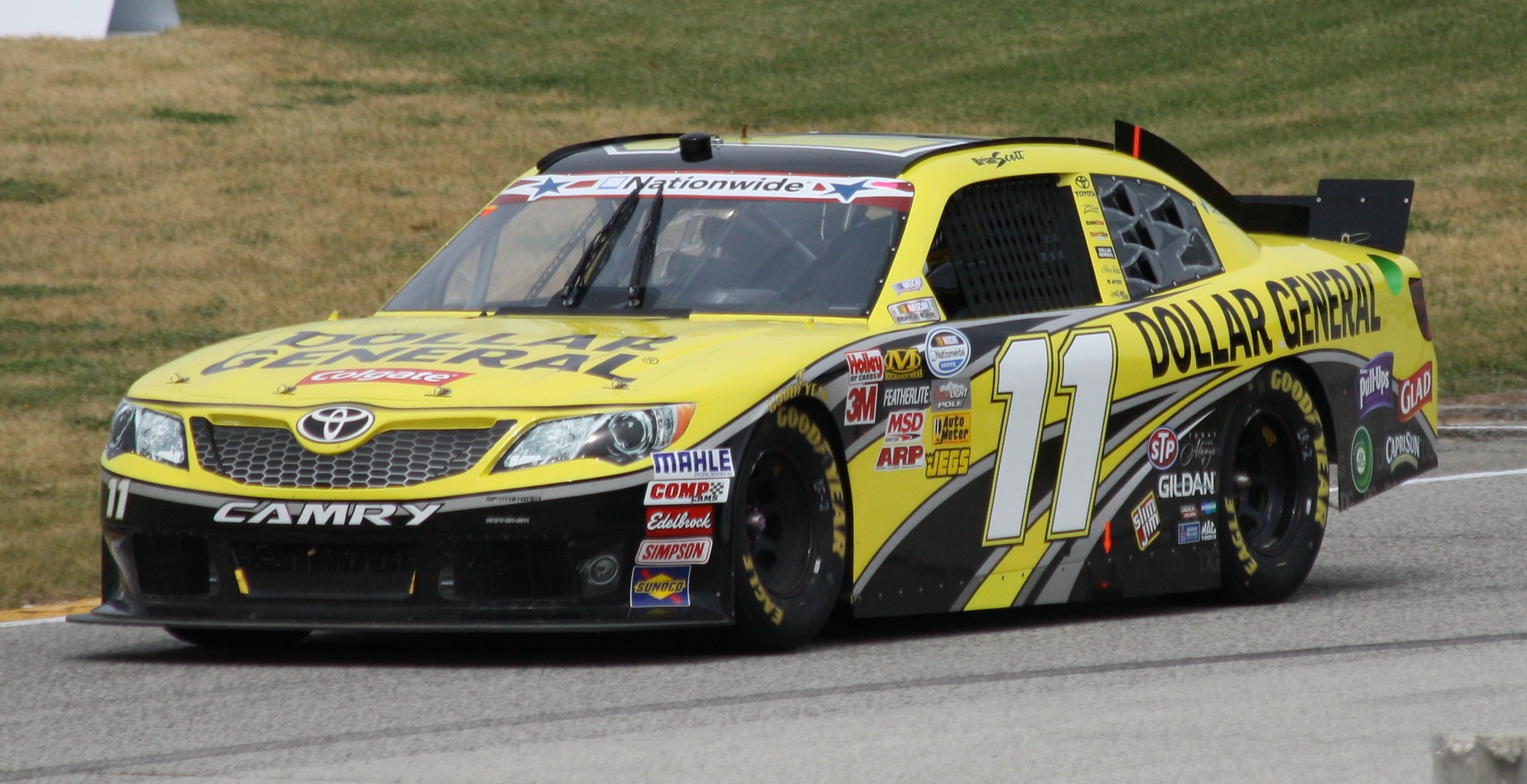
Scott's 2012 Nationwide car for Joe Gibbs Racing

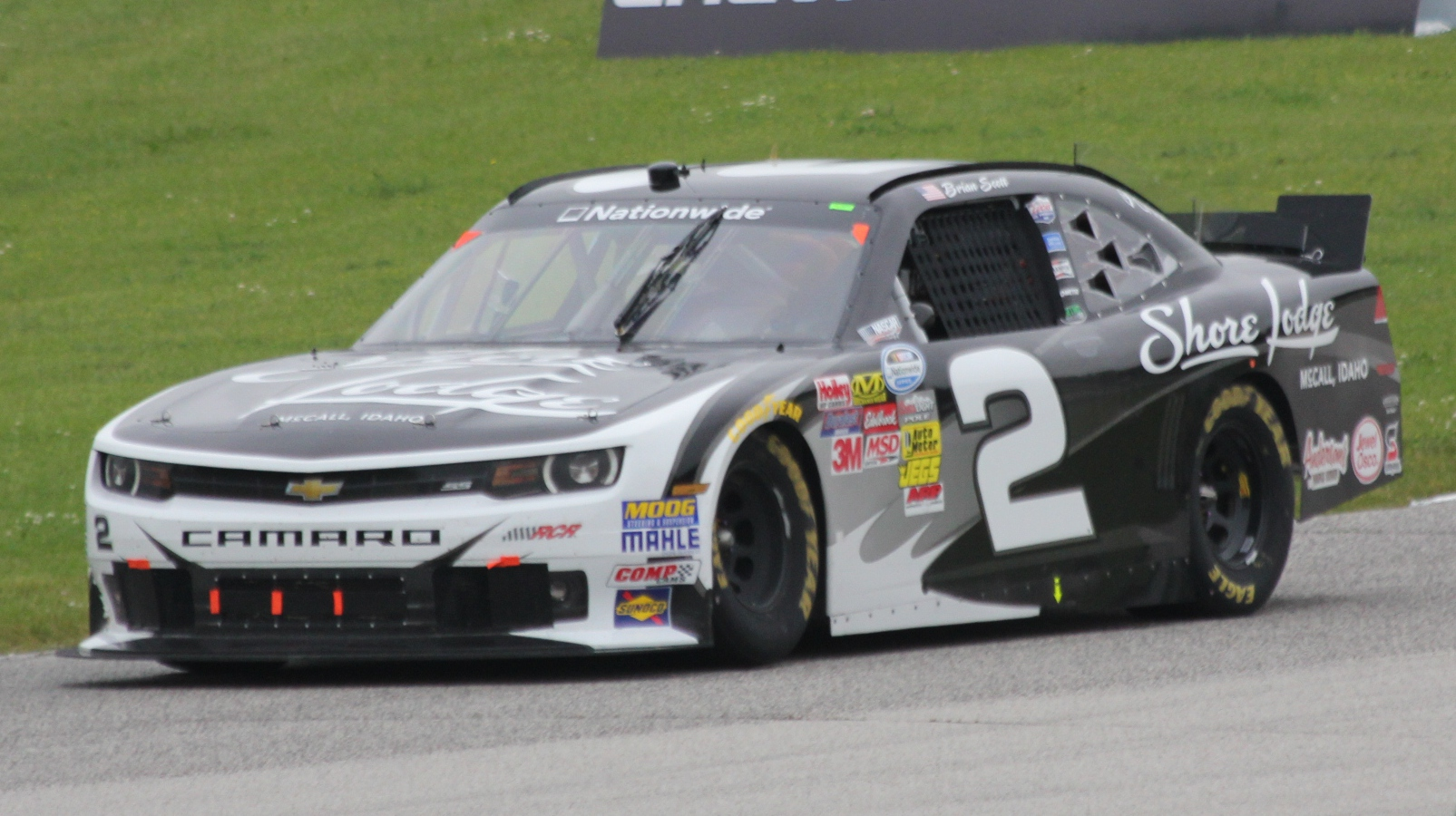
Scott's 2014 Nationwide car for Richard Childress Racing

Scott's Nationwide Series debut came in 2009 with seven starts in the series driving No. 10 and No. 11 for Braun Racing. Scott's first full season in the Nationwide Series was completed in 2010 with one top-five and five top-ten finishes en route to finishing the season as the runner-up for Raybestos Rookie of the Year honors. Scott ran the first 28 races in the Braun Racing No. 11 but was released from the ride when Steve Turner bought the team. Scott finished the season in the RAB Racing No. 09.

Scott joined Joe Gibbs Racing in 2011 driving No. 11. His 2011 Nationwide Series campaign earned him two top-five finishes, seven top-ten finishes and one pole under the Joe Gibbs Racing banner. He also scored the Featherlite Most Improved driver of the year award. Scott finished eighth in the Nationwide Series point standings in 2011.

Scott and crew chief Kevin Kidd returned to the No. 11 team in 2012, gaining a sponsorship from Dollar General. In addition, Scott signed to drive the No. 18 in the Camping World Truck Series for Kyle Busch Motorsports in a few races. Scott would have a best finish of third at Dover in the Nationwide Series, and returned to Victory Lane in the Truck Series at Phoenix. However, Scott would later be released from JGR in favor of championship runner-up Elliott Sadler. Scott later took over Sadler's previous No. 2 ride at Richard Childress Racing.

Scott earned his career best finish of second at Indianapolis Motor Speedway in 2013 after getting by Kyle Busch on a late race restart. Busch passed him only two laps later and Scott had to settle for second. At Richmond International Raceway that September Scott started on the pole and led 239 of 250 laps before being passed by Brad Keselowski and finishing second. Scott had a remarkable 2014 season, earning 23 top ten finishes and finished fourth in the championship standings.

==== Sprint Cup Series ====
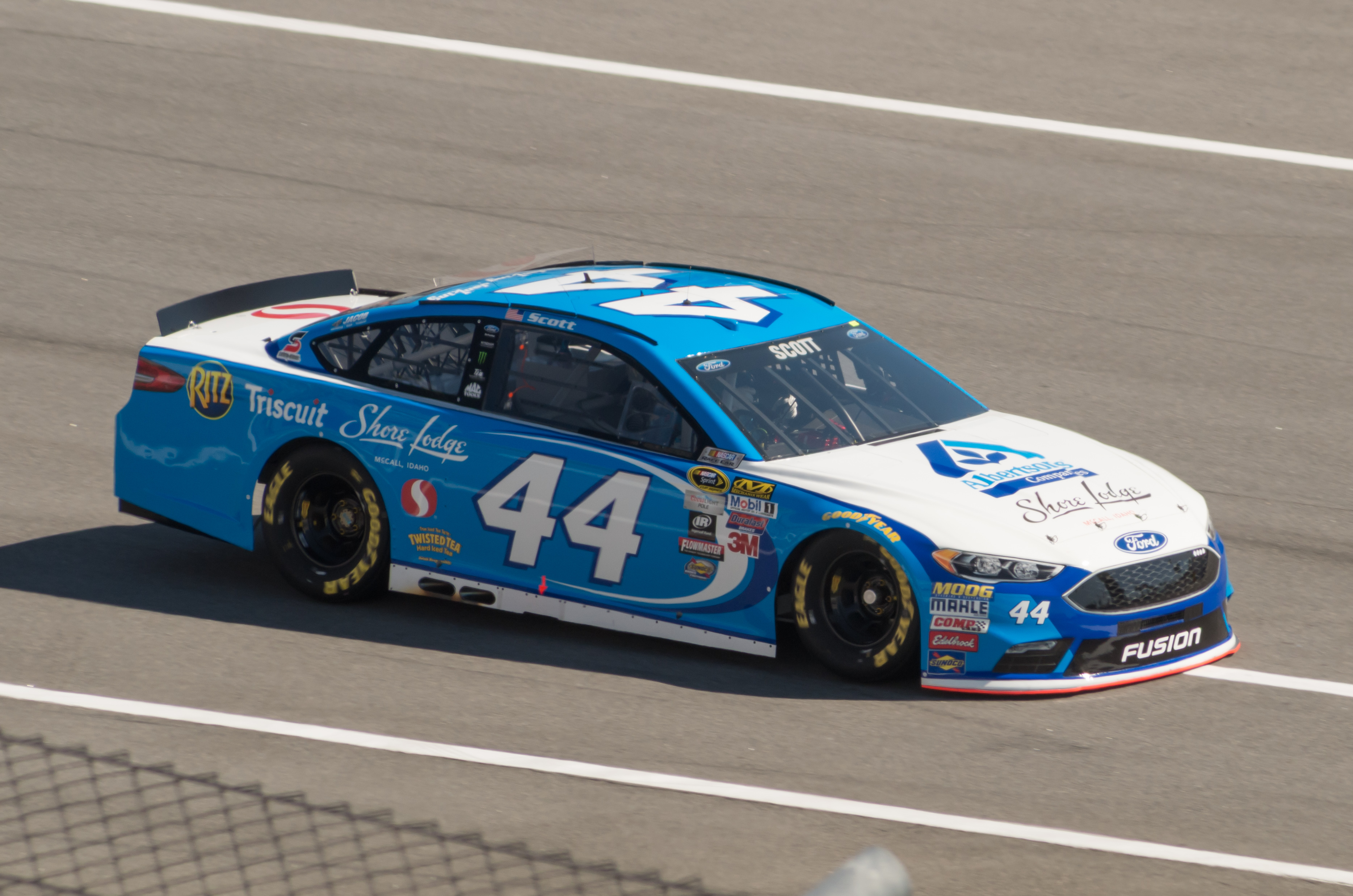
Scott's 2016 Cup car for Richard Petty Motorsports

In August 2013, it was announced that Scott would make his debut in the Sprint Cup Series, driving the No. 33 for RCR in the Bank of America 500 at Charlotte Motor Speedway. Scott started the race in nineteenth, and finished 27th, four laps down. Scott returned to the No. 33 for the 2014 Daytona 500. At Daytona, Scott led some laps and was collected in the big one late in the race. At Fontana a few weeks later, he tangled with Aric Almirola when Almirola lifted the throttle, causing Scott to run into the back of Almirola and wrecking both cars.

At Talladega, Scott won his first career Sprint Cup pole for the 2014 Aaron's 499 in the 33. In round #2, Scott had driven his fastest lap and for a total of five rounds, nobody was able to break the track record. In the race, Scott ran in the top-fifteen the entire race but was collected in "The Big One" that struck with 45 laps to go.

It was announced that Scott would drive the No. 29 for RCR in the 2015 Daytona 500, however just before the entry list was released, RCR cancelled plans to field the car for him. Instead, he was hired to drive the No. 62 Chevrolet of Premium Motorsports with RCR support, though Shore Lodge still sponsored the effort. Scott failed to qualify for the Daytona 500. Scott then successfully qualified RCR's No. 33 entry the next week at Atlanta. However, after Michael Annett failed to qualify, Scott gave up his ride to allow the Sprint Cup regular to earn driver points. After that, Scott finished thirteenth at Las Vegas, then his best finish in the series.

On December 9, 2015, Richard Petty Motorsports announced that Scott would take over Sam Hornish Jr.'s No. 9 ride for the 2016 season. The car was later renumbered to No. 44.

Scott started the 2016 season crashing on the last lap in his Can-Am Duel qualifying race. Then at Auto Club Speedway, Scott scored a career-best twelfth place finish. After a dismal 2016 with no top 10s going into October, he finished second on the bumper of Joey Logano's car at Talladega. It was the first top-five and ten in his career, his first top-ten for Richard Petty Motorsports, and his best career finish.

On November 10, 2016, Scott announced his retirement from NASCAR competition following the remainder of the 2016 season. Scott finished fifteenth in his last NASCAR race at Homestead.

==== Return to Xfinity Series ====
On July 3, 2017, Scott announced that he would come out of retirement to drive the No. 3 Chevrolet for Richard Childress Racing at Iowa and Kentucky in July and September respectively. In his first race of 2017 at Iowa, Scott finished a strong third place. As of 2026, he has not attempted and raced since.

== Personal life ==
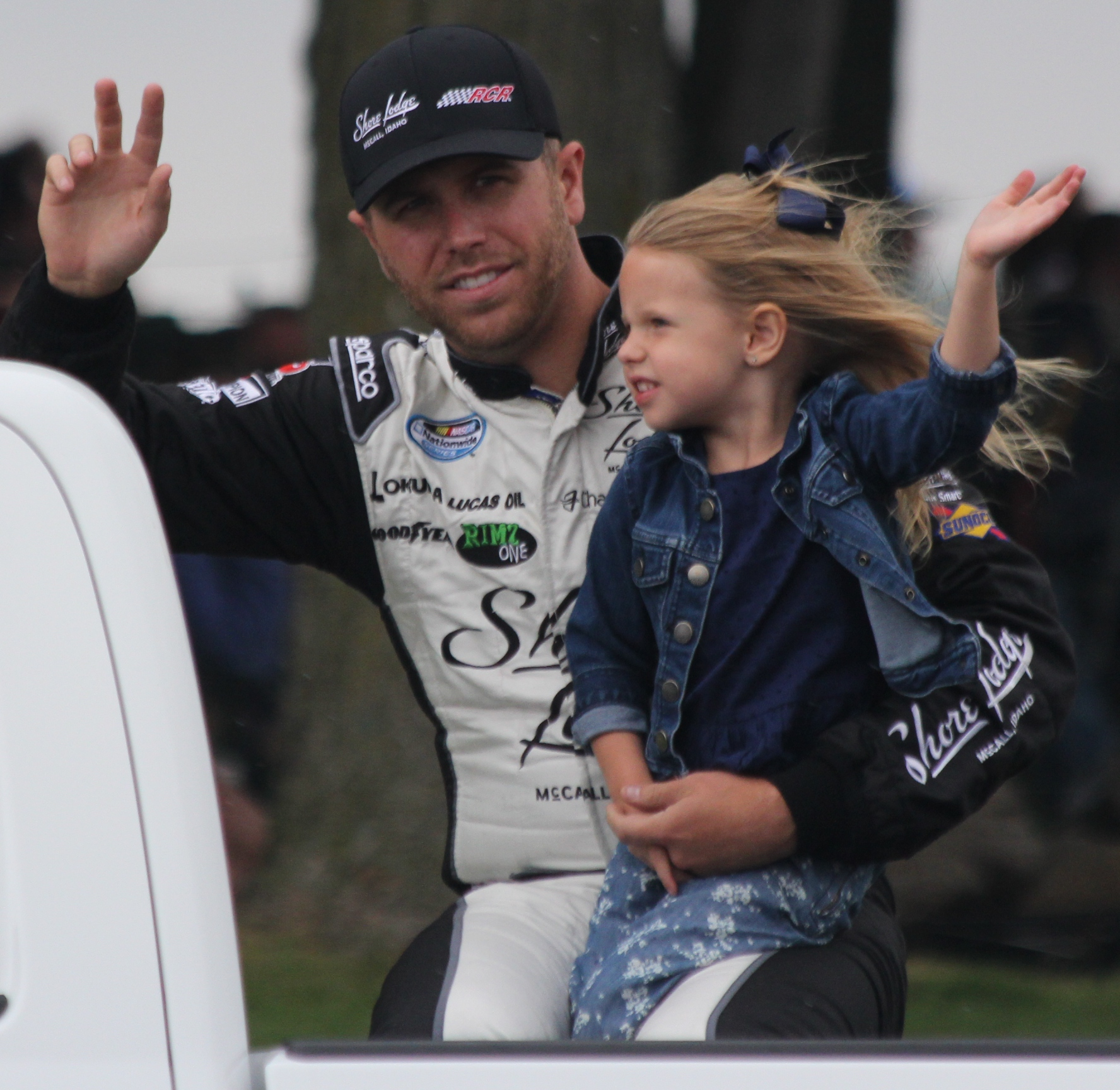
Scott and his stepdaughter Brielle in 2014

Scott's father Joe "J.B." Scott is the owner of the Shore Lodge and Whitetail Club resorts in McCall, Idaho. Scott is also the great-grandson of Joe Albertson and Kathryn Albertson, the founders of the Albertsons enterprise. The companies have sponsored Scott for much of his career.

Scott married Whitney Kay in the offseason of 2014–2015 at Shore Lodge. She has a daughter, Brielle, from a previous relationship (with former racing driver Sean Caisse). The two of them have a son together.

== Motorsports career results ==
=== Racing career summary ===
Season	Series	Team	Races	Wins	Top 5	Top 10	Points	Position
2007	ARCA Re/Max Series	Country Joe Racing	2	0	0	0	225	98th
2007	NASCAR Craftsman Truck Series	Xpress Motorsports	7	0	0	0	727	40th
2008	ARCA Re/Max Series	Bob Schacht Motorsports	1	0	0	0	1430	25th
2008	ARCA Re/Max Series	Venturini Motorsports	7	0	4	4	1430	25th
2008	NASCAR Craftsman Truck Series	Xpress Motorsports	25	0	2	7	2787	16th
2009	ARCA Re/Max Series	Venturini Motorsports	1	0	0	0	80	149th
2009	NASCAR Camping World Truck Series	Xpress Motorsports	25	1	7	13	3307	7th
2009	NASCAR Nationwide Series	Braun Racing	5	0	0	0	664	64th
2009	NASCAR Nationwide Series	CJM Racing	2	0	0	0	664	64th
2010	NASCAR Nationwide Series	Braun Racing	27	0	1	5	3525	14th
2010	NASCAR Nationwide Series	Turner Motorsports	1	0	0	0	3525	14th
2010	NASCAR Nationwide Series	RAB Racing	7	0	0	0	3525	14th
2011	NASCAR Nationwide Series	Joe Gibbs Racing	34	0	2	7	947	8th
2012	NASCAR Camping World Truck Series	Kyle Busch Motorsports	5	1	2	3	0	NC†
2012	NASCAR Nationwide Series	Joe Gibbs Racing	33	0	2	11	853	9th
2013	NASCAR Nationwide Series	Richard Childress Racing	33	0	3	13	1053	7th
2013	NASCAR Sprint Cup Series	Richard Childress Racing	1	0	0	0	0	NC†
2014	NASCAR Nationwide Series	Richard Childress Racing	33	0	6	23	1154	4th
2014	NASCAR Sprint Cup Series	Richard Childress Racing	6	0	0	0	0	NC†
2015	NASCAR Xfinity Series	Richard Childress Racing	33	0	6	18	1032	8th
2015	NASCAR Sprint Cup Series	Richard Childress Racing	10	0	0	0	0	NC†
2016	NASCAR Sprint Cup Series	Richard Petty Motorsports	36	0	1	1	481	31st
2017	NASCAR Xfinity Series	Richard Childress Racing	2	0	1	2	70	43rd

^{†} As Scott was a guest driver, he was ineligible for championship points.

=== NASCAR ===
(key) (Bold – Pole position awarded by qualifying time. Italics – Pole position earned by points standings or practice time. * – Most laps led.)

==== Sprint Cup Series ====
NASCAR Sprint Cup Series results
Year	Team	No.	Make	1	2	3	4	5	6	7	8	9	10	11	12	13	14	15	16	17	18	19	20	21	22	23	24	25	26	27	28	29	30	31	32	33	34	35	36	NSCC	Pts	Ref
2013	Richard Childress Racing	33	Chevy	DAY	PHO	LVS	BRI	CAL	MAR	TEX	KAN	RCH	TAL	DAR	CLT	DOV	POC	MCH	SON	KEN	DAY	NHA	IND	POC	GLN	MCH	BRI	ATL	RCH	CHI	NHA	DOV	KAN	CLT; 27	TAL	MAR	TEX	PHO	HOM	66th	0^{1}	
2014	Richard Childress Racing	33	Chevy	DAY; 25	PHO; 32	LVS	BRI	CAL; 35	MAR	TEX	DAR	RCH	**TAL**; 42	KAN	CLT; 32	DOV	POC	MCH	SON	KEN	DAY	NHA	IND	POC	GLN	MCH	BRI	ATL	RCH	CHI	NHA	DOV	KAN	CLT	TAL	MAR	TEX	PHO	HOM; 28	62nd	0^{1}	
2015	Premium Motorsports	62	Chevy	DAY; DNQ																																				53rd	0^{1}	
2015	Richard Childress Racing	33	Chevy		ATL; QL^{†}	LVS; 13	PHO	CAL; 27	MAR	TEX	BRI	RCH	TAL; 43	KAN	CLT	DOV; 38	POC	MCH	SON	DAY; 42	KEN	NHA	IND; 36	POC	GLN	MCH	BRI	DAR	RCH; 22	CHI; 22	NHA	DOV	CLT	KAN; 12	TAL	MAR	TEX; 14	PHO	HOM	53rd	0^{1}	
2016	Richard Petty Motorsports	44	Ford	DAY; 24	ATL; 31	LVS; 27	PHO; 27	CAL; 12	MAR; 26	TEX; 27	BRI; 30	RCH; 35	TAL; 30	KAN; 22	DOV; 24	CLT; 29	POC; 39	MCH; 36	SON; 33	DAY; 37	KEN; 33	NHA; 38	IND; 27	POC; 24	GLN; 25	BRI; 18	MCH; 28	DAR; 39	RCH; 35	CHI; 31	NHA; 31	DOV; 21	CLT; 22	KAN; 28	TAL; 2	MAR; 34	TEX; 27	PHO; 30	HOM; 15	31st	481	
^{†} - Qualified but replaced by Michael Annett

===== Daytona 500 =====
Year	Team	Manufacturer	Start	Finish
2014	Richard Childress Racing	Chevrolet	12	25
2015	Premium Motorsports	Chevrolet	DNQ	
2016	Richard Petty Motorsports	Ford	35	24

==== Xfinity Series ====
NASCAR Xfinity Series results
Year	Team	No.	Make	1	2	3	4	5	6	7	8	9	10	11	12	13	14	15	16	17	18	19	20	21	22	23	24	25	26	27	28	29	30	31	32	33	34	35	36	NXSC	Pts
2009	Braun Racing	10	Toyota	DAY	CAL	LVS	BRI	TEX	NSH; 25	PHO; 15	TAL	RCH; 32	DAR; 20	CLT	DOV	NSH	KEN	MLW	NHA	DAY	CHI	GTY	IRP	IOW	GLN	MCH							CAL; 23	CLT	MEM	TEX	PHO	HOM	64th	664	
2009	CJM Racing	11	Toyota																								BRI; 30	CGV	ATL	RCH	DOV	KAN; 14							64th	664	
2010	Braun Racing	11	Toyota	DAY; 19	CAL; 10	LVS; 31	BRI; 29	NSH; 15	PHO; 16	TEX; 15	TAL; 10	RCH; 28	DAR; 25	DOV; 9	CLT; 33	NSH; 28	KEN; 31	ROA; 13	NHA; 26	DAY; 30	CHI; 3	GTY; 6	IRP; 17	IOW; 30	GLN; 13	MCH; 15	BRI; 25	CGV; 40	ATL; 28	RCH; 38									14th	3525	
2010	Turner Motorsports	11	Toyota																												DOV; 13								14th	3525	
2010	RAB Racing	09	Ford																													KAN; 21	CAL; 15	CLT; 28	GTY; 14				14th	3525	
2010	RAB Racing	09	Toyota																																	TEX; 32	PHO; 11	HOM; 18	14th	3525	
2011	Joe Gibbs Racing	11	Toyota	DAY; 34	PHO; 9	LVS; 14	BRI; 12	CAL; 13	TEX; 10	TAL; 11	NSH; 22	RCH; 15	DAR; 29	DOV; 30	IOW; 27	CLT; 8	CHI; 17	MCH; 17	ROA; 16	DAY; 12	KEN; 15	NHA; 17	NSH; 17	IRP; 15	IOW; 14	GLN; 14	CGV; 12	BRI; 10	ATL; 12	RCH; 32	**CHI**; 3	DOV; 11	KAN; 17	CLT; 5	TEX; 12	PHO; 41	HOM; 9		8th	947	
2012	Joe Gibbs Racing	11	Toyota	DAY; 37	PHO; 14	LVS; 34	BRI; 35	CAL; 4	TEX; 37	RCH; 14	TAL; 36	DAR; 7	IOW; 11	CLT; 31	DOV; 3	MCH; 9	ROA; 7	KEN; 30	DAY; 32	NHA; 12	CHI; 11	IND; 14	IOW; 18	GLN; 10	CGV; 24	BRI; 34	ATL; 11	RCH; 28	CHI; 10	KEN; 11	DOV; 7	CLT; 8	KAN; 26	TEX; 22	PHO; 8	HOM; 7			9th	853	
2013	Richard Childress Racing	2	Chevy	DAY; 6	PHO; 10	LVS; 9	BRI; 10	CAL; 8	TEX; 11	RCH; 20	TAL; 27	DAR; 14	CLT; 15	DOV; 14	IOW; 6	MCH; 10	ROA; 20	KEN; 17	DAY; 17	NHA; 4	CHI; 11	IND; 2	IOW; 13	GLN; 11	MOH; 12	BRI; 9	ATL; 10	**RCH**; 2*	CHI; 14	KEN; 11	DOV; 11	KAN; 18	CLT; 12	TEX; 8	PHO; 13	HOM; 32			7th	1053	
2014	Richard Childress Racing	2	Chevy	DAY; 17	PHO; 12	LVS; 7	BRI; 14	CAL; 12	TEX; 12	DAR; 11	**RCH**; 5	TAL; 33	IOW; 6	CLT; 5	DOV; 7	MCH; 5	ROA; 16	KEN; 8	DAY; 16	NHA; 7	**CHI**; 6	IND; 7	IOW; 7	GLN; 10	MOH; 3*	BRI; 11	ATL; 7	RCH; 5	**CHI**; 9	KEN; 2	DOV; 7	KAN; 9	CLT; 10	TEX; 6	PHO; 7	HOM; 10			4th	1154	
2015	Richard Childress Racing	2	Chevy	DAY; 25	ATL; 7	LVS; 38	PHO; 10	CAL; 6	TEX; 10	BRI; 8	RCH; 7	TAL; 2	IOW; 4	CLT; 20	DOV; 36	MCH; 9	CHI; 8	DAY; 23*	KEN; 19	NHA; 29	IND; 11	IOW; 3	GLN; 6	MOH; 7	BRI; 6	ROA; 3	DAR; 12	RCH; 3	CHI; 17	KEN; 13	DOV; 31	CLT; 13	KAN; 23	TEX; 7	PHO; 11	HOM; 4			8th	1032	
2017	Richard Childress Racing	3	Chevy	DAY	ATL	LVS	PHO	CAL	TEX	BRI	RCH	TAL	CLT	DOV	POC	MCH	IOW	DAY	KEN	NHA	IND	IOW; 3	GLN	MOH	BRI	ROA	DAR	RCH	CHI	KEN; 8	DOV	CLT	KAN	TEX	PHO	HOM			43rd	70	

==== Camping World Truck Series ====
NASCAR Camping World Truck Series results
Year	Team	No.	Make	1	2	3	4	5	6	7	8	9	10	11	12	13	14	15	16	17	18	19	20	21	22	23	24	25	NCWTC	Pts	Ref
2007	Xpress Motorsports	16	Ford	DAY	CAL	ATL	MAR	KAN	CLT	MFD	DOV	TEX	MCH	MLW	MEM	KEN	IRP	NSH	BRI	GTW	NHA; 21	LVS; 29	TAL	MAR; 15	ATL; 19	TEX; 21	PHO; 18	HOM; 15	40th	727	
2008	Xpress Motorsports	16	Chevy	DAY; 9	CAL; 23	ATL; 17	MAR; 30	KAN; 14	CLT; 35	MFD; 25	DOV; 32	TEX; 13	MCH; 25	MLW; 32	MEM; 13	KEN; 32	IRP; 29	NSH; 14	BRI; 19	GTW; 14	NHA; 8								16th	2787	
2008	Xpress Motorsports	16	Toyota																			LVS; 14	TAL; 7	MAR; 14	ATL; 10	TEX; 9	PHO; 4	HOM; 2	16th	2787	
2009	Xpress Motorsports	16	Toyota	DAY; 12	CAL; 29	ATL; 10	MAR; 8	KAN; 3	CLT; 21	DOV; 1	TEX; 15	MCH; 34	MLW; 3	MEM; 2	KEN; 6	IRP; 12	NSH; 2	BRI; 5	CHI; 28	IOW; 9	GTW; 3	NHA; 7	LVS; 19	MAR; 24	TAL; 23	TEX; 7	PHO; 11	HOM; 12	7th	3307	
2012	Kyle Busch Motorsports	18	Toyota	DAY	MAR	CAR	KAN	CLT	DOV; 13	TEX	KEN	IOW	CHI	POC	MCH	BRI; 17	ATL	IOW	KEN; 5	LVS	TAL	MAR; 10	TEX	PHO; 1*	HOM				78th	0^{1}	

^{*} Season still in progress
^{1} Ineligible for series points

=== ARCA Re/Max Series ===
(key) (Bold – Pole position awarded by qualifying time. Italics – Pole position earned by points standings or practice time. * – Most laps led.)

ARCA Re/Max Series results
Year	Team	No.	Make	1	2	3	4	5	6	7	8	9	10	11	12	13	14	15	16	17	18	19	20	21	22	23	ARSC	Pts	Ref
2007	Country Joe Racing	32	Dodge	DAY	USA	NSH	SLM	KAN	WIN	KEN	TOL	IOW	POC	MCH	BLN	KEN; 13	POC	NSH	ISF	MIL	GTW	DSF	CHI	SLM	TAL; 34	TOL	98th	225	
2008	Bob Schacht Motorsports	75	Chevy	DAY; 40	SLM	IOW	KAN	CAR	KEN	TOL	POC																25th	1430	
2008	Venturini Motorsports	15	Chevy									MCH; 5	CAY														25th	1430	
2008	Venturini Motorsports	25	Chevy											**KEN**; 5	BLN	POC; 20	NSH; 3	ISF	DSF	CHI	SLM	NJE; 5	TAL; 34	TOL; 26			25th	1430	
2009	Venturini Motorsports	8	Toyota	DAY; 30	SLM	CAR	TAL	KEN	TOL	POC	MCH	MFD	IOW	KEN	BLN	POC	ISF	CHI	TOL	DSF	NJE	SLM	KAN	CAR			149th	80	
