= Joe Albertson =

American businessman (1906–1993)

- Born: Joseph Albert Albertson; October 17, 1906; Yukon, Oklahoma Territory (present-day Oklahoma)
- Died: January 20, 1993 (aged 86); Boise, Idaho, U.S.
- Resting place: Morris Hill Cemetery; Boise, Idaho
- Education: College of Idaho
- Occupation: Albertsons
- Known for: Founder of the Albertsons supermarket chain and philanthropist
- Political party: Republican
- Spouse: Kathryn McCurry Albertson (m. 1929–1993)
- Children: 1
- Relatives: Brian Scott (great-grandson)

Joseph Albert Albertson (October 17, 1906 – January 20, 1993) was an American entrepreneur and founder of the Albertsons grocery store chain, one of the largest food and drug retailers in the United States.

== Early life ==
Born in Yukon, Oklahoma Territory, Albertson was one of four sons born to Rhoda and Earl Albertson. In 1909, the family moved west to Caldwell, Idaho.

After having graduated from Caldwell High School in 1925, Albertson studied business for two years at the College of Idaho in Caldwell.

== Career ==
While in college in 1927, he worked as a clerk at a local Safeway grocery store, where he eventually became a district manager. On December 31, 1929, he married his college classmate Kathryn McCurry of Boise, Idaho. They had one daughter, Barbara Jean Albertson Newman (1933–2012).

By 1939, Albertson was supervising more than a dozen stores at Safeway. Wanting to start his own store, Albertson used $5,000 of his own money and $7,500 borrowed from his wife's aunt to open his first Albertsons grocery store in partnership with L.S. Skaggs, a former Safeway division manager, and Tom Cuthbert, Skaggs's accountant. The store, at Sixteenth and State Streets in Boise, had an automated donut machine and one of the first magazine racks in the USA.

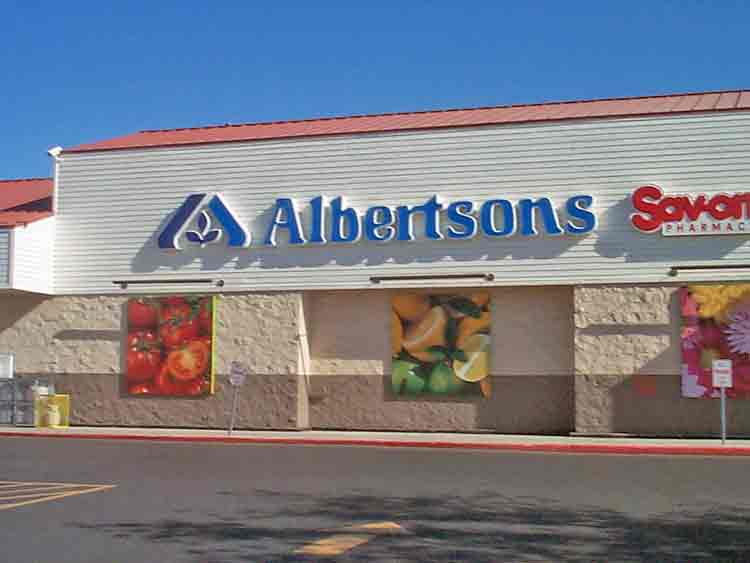
This is an Albertsons grocery store with a Sav-on Pharmacy.

Albertson opened his second and third Albertsons stores in Nampa and Caldwell in 1940. During World War II, when food was being rationed, he filled empty shelves with health and beauty products, general household goods, and other non-food items. His stores promoted war bonds and sponsored scrap drives that collected aluminum, steel, fats, and paper for recycling.

In 1945, the partnership with Skaggs was disbanded and Albertsons was founded. Albertson would be chairman of the board until 1976, when he stepped down at age 70. By that time, the company had grown to over 300 stores and achieved $1 billion in annual sales.

Albertson died in Boise on January 20, 1993.

== J.A. and Kathryn Albertson Foundation ==
In 1966, Joe and Kathryn established the J.A. and Kathryn Albertson Foundation to manage their charitable giving. The foundation focuses on giving primarily to education, an area of personal importance as Joe and Kathryn were both unable to finish college during the Great Depression. Since then, the foundation has given more than $750 million to Idaho's communities, particularly in areas where Joe and Kathryn lived or worked. Their initiatives focus on learning, leadership, and community.

Albertson donated over $72 million to the College of Idaho. In recognition of his generosity, the college was renamed the Albertson College of Idaho from 1991 to 2007. The 41-acre (17 ha) Kathryn Albertson Park in Boise, with its winding walkways, wildflowers, trees, and ponds, was donated to the citizens of Idaho. The College of Business and Economics at the University of Idaho in Moscow is named for Joe Albertson.
