= Diane Raptosh =

American writer

- Education: College of Idaho; University of Michigan
- Occupation: Poet
- Writing career
- Genre: Poetry
- Notable awards: Boise Poet Laureate; Idaho Commission on the Arts Writer-in-Residence
- Website: dianeraptosh.com

Diane Raptosh (born October 14, 1961) is an American poet of Sicilian/American descent who became the first poet laureate for Boise, Idaho, in 2013, a position that was eliminated after her tenure. A self-described "noted author, poet and educator," “highly active ambassador for poetry,” and “cutting-edge advocate,” Raptosh grew up in Idaho and attended the College of Idaho in Caldwell, Idaho, earning a BA in literature and modern languages. She received an MFA in poetry from the University of Michigan, returning to teach undergraduates at the College of Idaho in 1990. She is the mother of Keats Conley, whose first book, Guidance from the Gods of Seahorses, was a finalist for the Wandering Aengus award and was published by Green Writers Press in 2021. Both mother and daughter use alliteration, assonance, and puns to craft whimsical poems.

Raptosh received three literature fellowships from the Idaho Commission on the Arts and holds the Eyck-Berringer Endowed Chair in English at the College of Idaho. In 2013, the Idaho Commission on the Arts awarded her the position of Writer-in-Residence, the highest literary honor in the entire state of Idaho.

At the College of Idaho, Raptosh teaches literature and creative writing and directs the Criminal Justice Studies program, through which Raptosh and students facilitate year-long writing workshops in prisons, jails, juvenile detention centers and safe houses throughout southeast Idaho and western Oregon, and are introduced to the study of American prison writing.

Raptosh lives in Boise, Idaho, with her family.

== Works ==
Well known within Idaho, Raptosh writes in forms including prose poetry and sonnets. She is interested in what one poem in American Amnesiac calls "the spine of a possible decency."

Raptosh's first book of poems, Just West of Now (Guernica, Canada), was published in 1992. Her other books of poetry are Labor Songs (Guernica, 1999), Parents from a Different Alphabet (Guernica, 2008), and American Amnesiac (Etruscan Press, 2013).

The poems in Just West of Now are concerned with "our failures of communication, the limitations and possibilities of speech, the search for a literal and figurative home, the entanglements of love given and received," according to Alice Fulton, who noted that "Raptosh’s work will please those who don’t read much poetry as well as those who read little else."

Her second collection, Labor Songs, "speaks in many voices in order to scrutinize the world from multiple perspectives... to chart a complex geography centered in Idaho but further reaching out towards Michigan, Florida, Alaska, and beyond," according to Sandra M. Gilbert.

Her third book, Parents from a Different Alphabet, is a collection of prose poems that reckon with gender constructs as well as the plights and blitheness of the body, individual and collective. The book is dedicated to her father, whose death helped shape the book .

American Amnesiac (2013), Raptosh’s fourth collection, was longlisted (a semi-finalist) for the 2013 National Book Award. The dramatic monologue, which Raptosh also considers a novella in verse, takes on individual identity, corporate personhood, and the U.S. prison system. A finalist for the 2013 Housatonic Book Award in Poetry, American Amnesiac was described by Daniela Gioseffi as "a magnum opus—one long poem spoken in the persona of an older man suffering from amnesia. The book constitutes his stream of consciousness as he attempts to piece together who he is and what he’s experienced in his American life." H.L. Hix writes that "American Amnesiac makes a genre of the condition its protagonist suffers: it is a dissociative fugue. What its speaker cannot remember, its reader will not forget." Marc Sheehan wrote, "In these poems, Rinehart/Doe spends as much time and emotional energy piecing together the world around him as he does trying to reconstruct his past. Culture, Rinehart/Doe discovers, both liberates us from ourselves and imprisons us in its expectations."

Of her fifth collection, Human Directional (Etruscan Press 2016), Craig Morgan Teicher wrote, "Nothing is off limits to the whirling speaker of Diane Raptosh’s Human Directional, because ‘the space of// the thinkable is so much/ larger’ than any one kind of poem, any form, any tone, can contain. So here are spidery couplets, blocks of off-kilter prose, Q&A as poetry, new compound words, fractions and factoids, whatever’s necessary to speak the mind of this ‘every anyone,’ ‘a human tornado’ whose careening meditations cover everything from Wittgenstein to ‘blue-footed-boobies’ to ‘Gayle next door...’ Raptosh is at heart an old-fashioned lyric poet, endearingly lonesome, hopeful about the prospect of a reader’s company, generous with her ample wisdom and energy: ‘I am here,’ she writes, ‘because I have this tightness in my throat/ I don’t want taking over the earth,’ and because ‘I fall slightly in love with whoever I get to/ stand next to.’ It’s hard not to feel loved by these poems, and to love them."

Her sixth collection, The Zygote Epistles, is about the poet becoming a grandmother, and is a collection of poems addressed to a zygote.

According to Etruscan Press, her next work will "reclaim with intimacy the spiritual, sexual and political history of Victoria Woodhull, an American feminist purged from the annals,” and will appear in an anthologized trio of works titled Trio. Raptosh has said that “likely due to her perceived threats to the established social order, Woodhull remains curiously absent from mainstream historical narratives.”

Raptosh's work has appeared in the Los Angeles Review of Books, Women’s Studies Quarterly, Terrain.org, Michigan Quarterly Review and OccuPoetry.

== Honors and awards ==
- 2013: American Amnesiac longlisted for National Book Award
- 2013–2016: Idaho Writer-in-Residence
- 2013: Boise Poet Laureate
- 2007: Fellowship in Literature, Idaho Commission on the Arts
- 2001: Fellowship in Literature, Idaho Commission on the Arts
- 1991: Fellowship in Literature, Idaho Commission on the Arts

== Full-length poetry collections ==
- Human Directional. Etruscan Press. 2016. ISBN 978-0-9903221-6-0
- American Amnesiac. Etruscan Press. 2013. ISBN 978-0-9839346-6-0
- Parents From a Different Alphabet. Guernica Editions. 2008. ISBN 978-1550712858
- Labor Songs. 1999. Guernica Editions. ISBN 978-1550710595
- Just West of Now. 1992. Guernica Editions. ISBN 978-0920717714

== Selected anthologies ==
- Trio: Planet Parable, Run: a Verse History of Victoria Woodhull, and Endless Body, 2021
- Verse/Chorus: A Call and Response Anthology, 2014
- The Untidy Season: An Anthology of Nebraska Women Poets, 2013
- Classifieds: An Anthology of Prose Poems, 2012
- New Poets of the American West, 2010
- Mamas and Papas On the Sublime and Heartbreaking Act of Parenting, 2010
- Families: The Frontline of Pluralism, 2008
- Sinatra... but buddy, I’m a kind of poem, 2008
- Writing With An Accent: Contemporary Italian American Women Authors, 2002
- Circle of Women: An Anthology of Contemporary Western Women Writers, 2001
- Woven on the Wind: Women Write About Friendship in the Sagebrush West, 2001

== TEDx Talk ==
In 2015, Raptosh gave a TEDx Talk in Boise, Idaho called “Poetry, Democracy, and the Hope of Sounds” in which she describes the poet as "language’s bodyguard," citing her mother’s linguistic influences on her. "Poetry retunes language into angles of truth," she says.
