= 2016 Bass Pro Shops NRA Night Race =

Race details
- Race 23 of 36 in the 2016 NASCAR Sprint Cup Series
- The 2016 Bass Pro Shops NRA Night Race program cover, featuring Tony Stewart. Artwork by Sam Bass. The painting is called "Smokescreen!"
- Date: August 20–21, 2016
- Location: Bristol Motor Speedway in Bristol, Tennessee
- Course: Permanent racing facility
- Course length: .533 miles (.858 km)
- Distance: 500 laps, 266.5 mi (429 km)
- Average speed: 77.968 mph (125.477 km/h)

Pole position
Driver	Carl Edwards	Joe Gibbs Racing
- Time: 14.602

Most laps led
Driver	Kyle Busch	Joe Gibbs Racing
- Laps: 256

Winner
No. 4	Kevin Harvick	Stewart–Haas Racing

Television in the United States
- Network: NBCSN; CNBC
- Announcers: Rick Allen, Jeff Burton and Steve Letarte

Radio in the United States
- Radio: PRN
- Booth announcers: Doug Rice, Mark Garrow and Wendy Venturini
- Turn announcers: Rob Albright (Backstretch)

The 2016 Bass Pro Shops NRA Night Race was a NASCAR Sprint Cup Series stock car race held on August 20–21, 2016 at Bristol Motor Speedway in Bristol, Tennessee. 48 laps were completed during the evening of August 20 before the race was stopped due to rain and completed on August 21, 2016. Contested over 500 laps on the .533-mile (0.858 km) short track, it was the 23rd race of the 2016 NASCAR Sprint Cup Series season.

Kevin Harvick scored his third win of the season, The race had eight lead changes among different drivers and nine cautions for 106 laps, as well as 3 red flags for a total of 18 hours, 21 minutes and 4 seconds.

== Report ==
=== Background ===
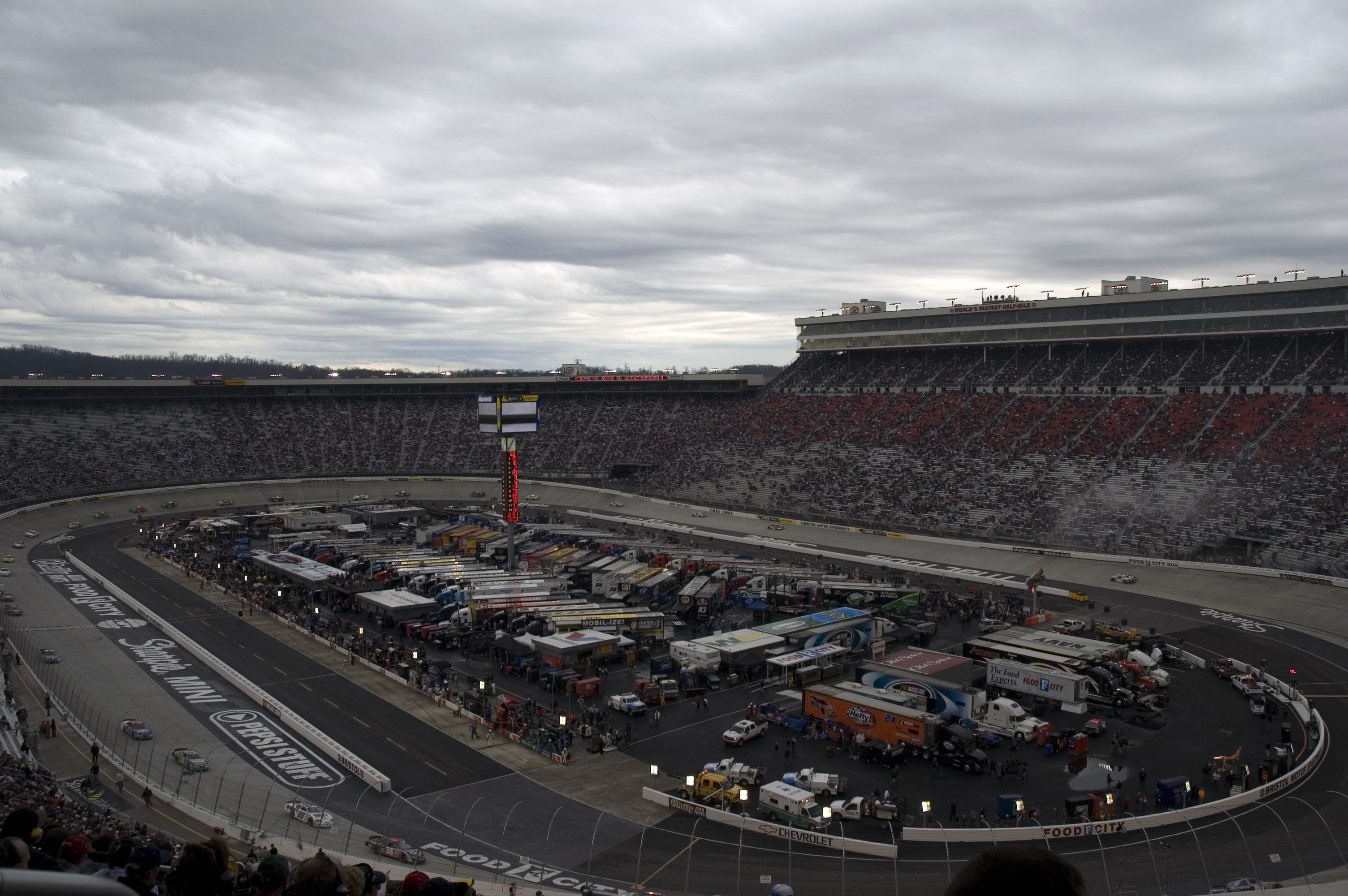
Bristol Motor Speedway, the track where the race was held.

Bristol Motor Speedway is a 0.533-mile (0.858 km) oval short track in Bristol, Tennessee.

=== Entry list ===
The preliminary entry list for the race included 40 cars and was released on August 15, 2016 at 9:25 a.m. Eastern time.

No.	Driver	Team	Manufacturer
1	Jamie McMurray	Chip Ganassi Racing	Chevrolet
2	Brad Keselowski	Team Penske	Ford
3	Austin Dillon	Richard Childress Racing	Chevrolet
4	Kevin Harvick	Stewart–Haas Racing	Chevrolet
5	Kasey Kahne	Hendrick Motorsports	Chevrolet
6	Trevor Bayne	Roush Fenway Racing	Ford
7	Regan Smith	Tommy Baldwin Racing	Chevrolet
10	Danica Patrick	Stewart–Haas Racing	Chevrolet
11	Denny Hamlin	Joe Gibbs Racing	Toyota
13	Casey Mears	Germain Racing	Chevrolet
14	Tony Stewart	Stewart–Haas Racing	Chevrolet
15	Clint Bowyer	HScott Motorsports	Chevrolet
16	Greg Biffle	Roush Fenway Racing	Ford
17	Ricky Stenhouse Jr.	Roush Fenway Racing	Ford
18	Kyle Busch	Joe Gibbs Racing	Toyota
19	Carl Edwards	Joe Gibbs Racing	Toyota
20	Matt Kenseth	Joe Gibbs Racing	Toyota
21	Ryan Blaney (R)	Wood Brothers Racing	Ford
22	Joey Logano	Team Penske	Ford
23	David Ragan	BK Racing	Toyota
24	Chase Elliott (R)	Hendrick Motorsports	Chevrolet
27	Paul Menard	Richard Childress Racing	Chevrolet
30	Josh Wise	The Motorsports Group	Chevrolet
31	Ryan Newman	Richard Childress Racing	Chevrolet
32	Jeffrey Earnhardt (R)	Go FAS Racing	Ford
34	Chris Buescher (R)	Front Row Motorsports	Ford
38	Landon Cassill	Front Row Motorsports	Ford
41	Kurt Busch	Stewart–Haas Racing	Chevrolet
42	Kyle Larson	Chip Ganassi Racing	Chevrolet
43	Aric Almirola	Richard Petty Motorsports	Ford
44	Brian Scott (R)	Richard Petty Motorsports	Ford
46	Michael Annett	HScott Motorsports	Chevrolet
47	A. J. Allmendinger	JTG Daugherty Racing	Chevrolet
48	Jimmie Johnson	Hendrick Motorsports	Chevrolet
55	Reed Sorenson	Premium Motorsports	Chevrolet
78	Martin Truex Jr.	Furniture Row Racing	Toyota
83	Matt DiBenedetto	BK Racing	Toyota
88	Jeff Gordon	Hendrick Motorsports	Chevrolet
95	Michael McDowell	Circle Sport – Leavine Family Racing	Chevrolet
98	Cole Whitt	Premium Motorsports	Chevrolet
Official entry list

== Practice ==
=== First practice ===
Kyle Busch was the fastest in the first practice session with a time of 14.878 and a speed of 128.969 mph (207.555 km/h).

Pos	No.	Driver	Team	Manufacturer	Time	Speed
1	18	Kyle Busch	Joe Gibbs Racing	Toyota	14.878	128.969
2	11	Denny Hamlin	Joe Gibbs Racing	Toyota	14.915	128.649
3	42	Kyle Larson	Chip Ganassi Racing	Chevrolet	14.921	128.597
Official first practice results

=== Final practice ===
Kyle Busch was fastest in the final practice session with a time of 14.796 and a speed of 129.684 mph (208.706 km/h).

Pos	No.	Driver	Team	Manufacturer	Time	Speed
1	18	Kyle Busch	Joe Gibbs Racing	Toyota	14.796	129.684
2	78	Martin Truex Jr.	Furniture Row Racing	Toyota	14.807	129.587
3	20	Matt Kenseth	Joe Gibbs Racing	Toyota	14.830	129.386
Official final practice results

== Qualifying ==
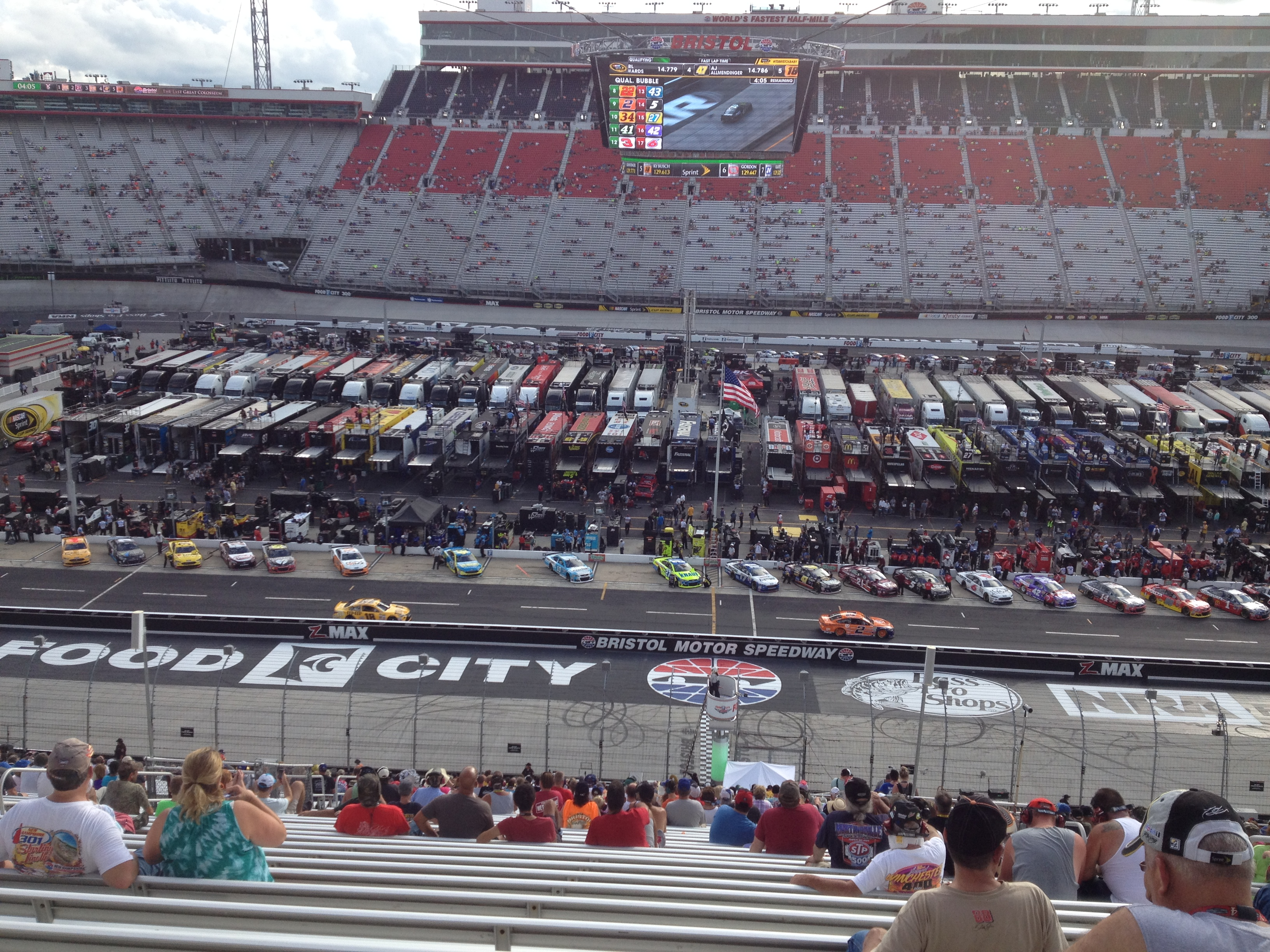
Qualifying for the race

Carl Edwards scored the pole for the race with a time of 14.602 and a speed of 131.407 mph (211.479 km/h). He stated afterwards that his chances of sweeping Bristol after sweeping both poles "is good. The car is very fast. Our team just responds to anything thrown at us. (Crew chief) Dave Rogers isn’t afraid to make changes. We will see if we can finish this deal tomorrow night and be talking about how we were able to do it in the race."

Denny Hamlin, who qualified second and broke the previous track record – that he also held – with a time of 14.573 and a speed of 131.668 mph (211.899 km/h), said that he couldn't "believe we’ve qualified as good as we have this year and not gotten a pole. I think we did all we could. We just came up a tiny bit short."

"Third is a pretty solid place to start," Kyle Busch said after qualifying third. "Our car handled well today. Of course the pole position would’ve been awesome, but we’ll take third and give it our best shot tomorrow night."

=== Qualifying results ===
Pos	No.	Driver	Team	Manufacturer	R1	R2	R3
1	19	Carl Edwards	Joe Gibbs Racing	Toyota	14.769	14.779	14.602
2	11	Denny Hamlin	Joe Gibbs Racing	Toyota	14.573	14.704	14.625
3	18	Kyle Busch	Joe Gibbs Racing	Toyota	14.647	14.804	14.655
4	21	Ryan Blaney (R)	Wood Brothers Racing	Ford	14.746	14.778	14.688
5	20	Matt Kenseth	Joe Gibbs Racing	Toyota	14.741	14.726	14.690
6	24	Chase Elliott (R)	Hendrick Motorsports	Chevrolet	14.892	14.837	14.777
7	78	Martin Truex Jr.	Furniture Row Racing	Toyota	14.858	14.732	14.812
8	47	A. J. Allmendinger	JTG Daugherty Racing	Chevrolet	14.924	14.786	14.819
9	2	Brad Keselowski	Team Penske	Ford	14.836	14.856	14.836
10	22	Joey Logano	Team Penske	Ford	14.735	14.842	14.855
11	88	Jeff Gordon	Hendrick Motorsports	Chevrolet	14.862	14.823	14.870
12	34	Chris Buescher (R)	Front Row Motorsports	Ford	14.828	14.867	14.956
13	3	Austin Dillon	Richard Childress Racing	Chevrolet	14.902	14.872	
14	41	Kurt Busch	Stewart–Haas Racing	Chevrolet	14.837	14.883	
15	31	Ryan Newman	Richard Childress Racing	Chevrolet	14.925	14.913	
16	48	Jimmie Johnson	Hendrick Motorsports	Chevrolet	14.915	14.918	
17	43	Aric Almirola	Richard Petty Motorsports	Ford	14.905	14.918	
18	83	Matt DiBenedetto	BK Racing	Toyota	14.955	14.932	
19	5	Kasey Kahne	Hendrick Motorsports	Chevrolet	14.754		
20	27	Paul Menard	Richard Childress Racing	Chevrolet	14.843		
21	13	Casey Mears	Germin Racing	Chevrolet	14.943		
22	6	Trevor Bayne	Roush Fenway Racing	Ford	14.894		
23	42	Kyle Larson	Chip Ganassi Racing	Chevrolet	14.863		
24	4	Kevin Harvick	Stewart–Haas Racing	Chevrolet	14.943		
25	17	Ricky Stenhouse Jr.	Roush Fenway Racing	Ford	14.958		
26	95	Michael McDowell	Circle Sport – Leavine Family Racing	Chevrolet	14.975		
27	14	Tony Stewart	Stewart–Haas Racing	Chevrolet	15.010		
28	1	Jamie McMurray	Chip Ganassi Racing	Chevrolet	15.013		
29	10	Danica Patrick	Stewart–Haas Racing	Chevrolet	15.032		
30	44	Brian Scott (R)	Richard Petty Motorsports	Ford	15.039		
31	15	Clint Bowyer	HScott Motorsports	Chevrolet	15.109		
32	38	Landon Cassill	Front Row Motorsports	Ford	15.110		
33	7	Regan Smith	Tommy Baldwin Racing	Chevrolet	15.162		
34	16	Greg Biffle	Roush Fenway Racing	Ford	15.163		
35	98	Cole Whitt	Premium Motorsports	Chevrolet	15.291		
36	55	Reed Sorenson	Premium Motorsports	Chevrolet	15.306		
37	23	David Ragan	BK Racing	Toyota	15.331		
38	32	Jeffrey Earnhardt (R)	Go FAS Racing	Ford	15.436		
39	46	Michael Annett	HScott Motorsports	Chevrolet	15.521		
40	30	Josh Wise	The Motorsports Group	Chevrolet	15.694		
Official qualifying results

== Race ==
=== Saturday ===
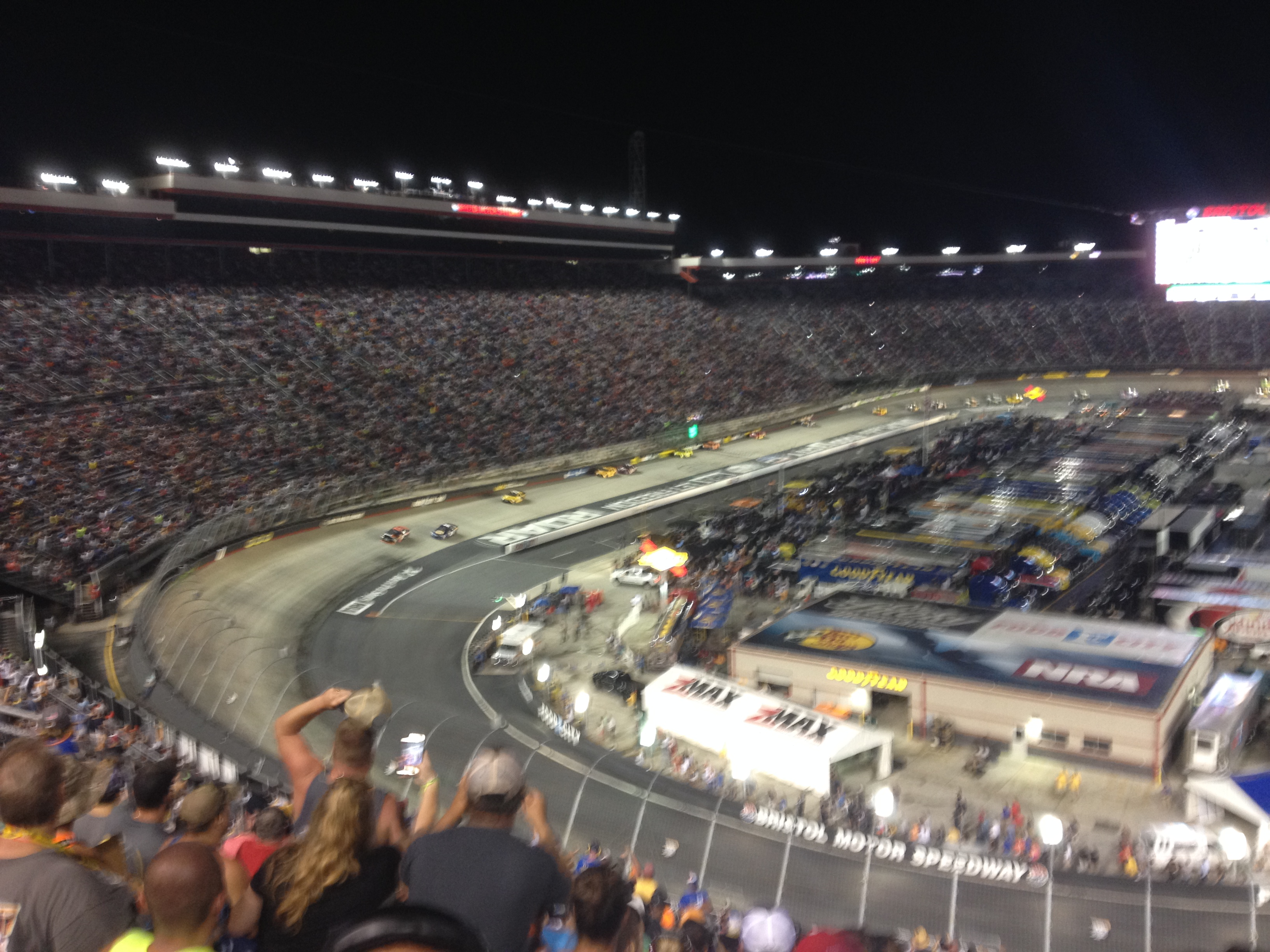
Denny Hamlin leads early in the race

The start of the race was delayed by rain and lightning in the vicinity of the speedway for nearly 30 minutes. The drivers were called to their cars at 8:40 p.m. and rolled off pit road around 8:57. Under night Tennessee skies, Carl Edwards led the field to the green flag at 9:03. Teammate Denny Hamlin got a much better start and led the first lap. Chase Elliott worked his way up to Hamlin and passed him for the lead on the ninth lap. Kyle Busch reeled him in to pass under him in turn 4 to take the lead on lap 23. The first caution of the race flew on lap 30 for rain. It picked up in intensity to the point that the race was red-flagged on lap 38. The red flag period lasted for one hour, 24 minutes and four seconds before engines were refired at 10:42 and the cars rolled back onto the track. After eight laps riding around, the rain returned with greater intensity and the race was red-flagged a second time at lap 48. Just past 11:00, the rest of the race was postponed to Sunday at 1:00 p.m.

=== Sunday ===
Further rain off and on caused NASCAR to delay the restart of the race three and a half hours from the originally rescheduled start time to 4:33 p.m. on Sunday, August 21, for nearly 17 1/2 hurs of weather delays. The race restarted on lap 58. Competitors were told by NASCAR on the restart, there would be no refueling would be prohibited, as a competition caution was planned for Lap 85, roughly after 28 laps of racing to evaluate tire wear on the concrete circuit. Half the field was running the bottom line of the track while the other half was running the high line to "rubber-in" the untreated higher lane. The field largely rode around until the second caution of the race flew on lap 85. It was a planned competition caution. Brian Scott opted not to pit under the caution and assumed the lead. Kyle Larson and Ricky Stenhouse Jr. were both tagged for speeding on pit road and restarted the race from the tail end of the field.

The race restarted on lap 91. Ryan Newman edged out Scott at the line to take the lead on lap 92. Busch drove around Newman on the high line to retake the lead on lap 102. The third caution of the race flew on lap 158 for a single-car wreck in turn 2 involving Regan Smith. Edwards exited pit road with the race lead.

The race restarted on lap 165. Edwards sat in command of the race for 27 laps before Busch took back the lead on lap 193. Debris in turn 3 brought the fourth caution of the race on lap 254, just after the race was deemed official, meaning they would not have to return Monday if there was another weather incident. The race restarted on lap 262. Kevin Harvick took the lead for the first time on lap 288. The fifth caution of the race flew on lap 308 for a single-car spin by Kyle Larson in turn 4. Hamlin was tagged for speeding and restarted the race from the tail end of the field.

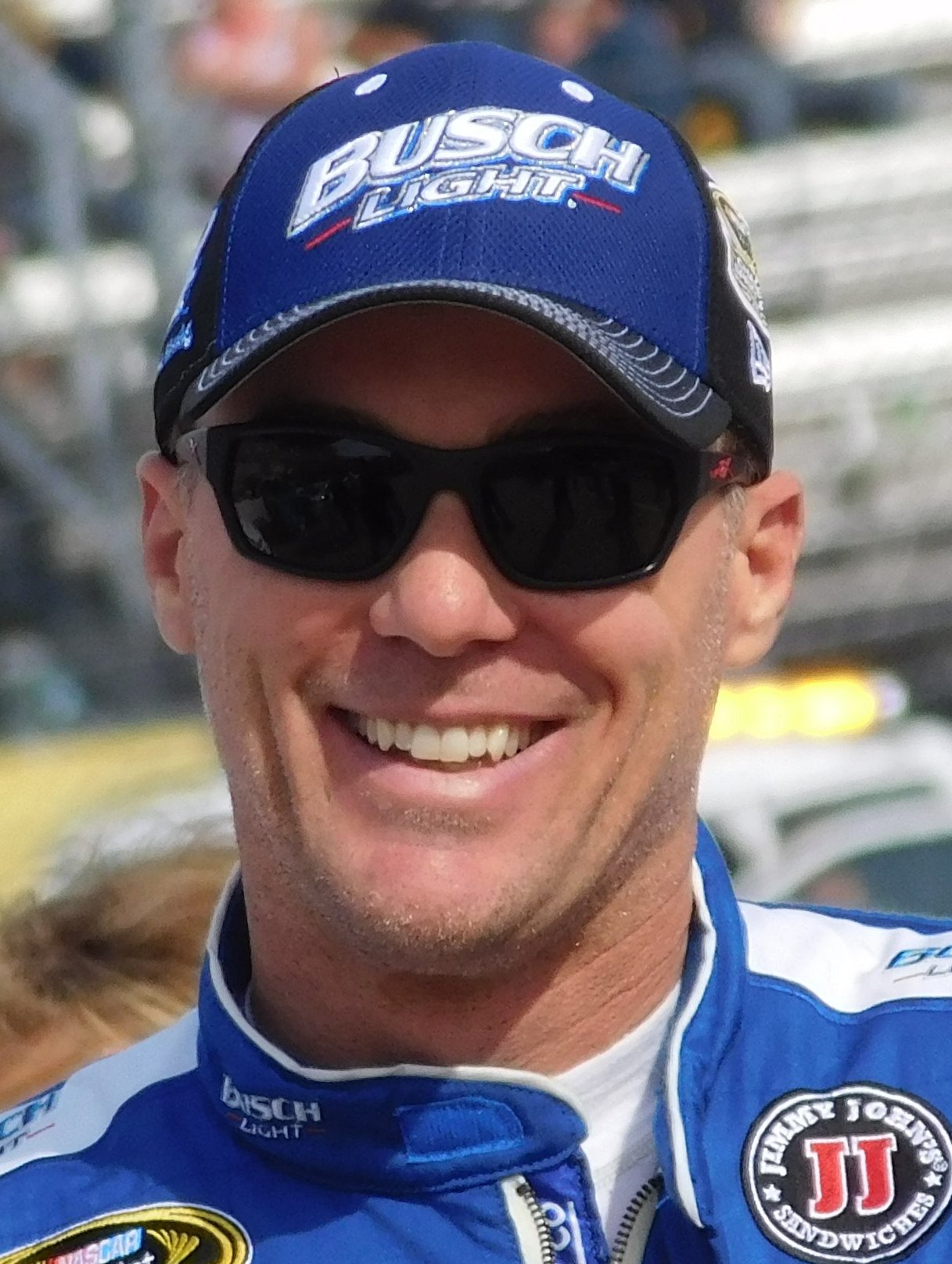
Kevin Harvick won the race.

The race restarted on lap 316. Busch controlled the race for the next 32 laps before losing the lead to Harvick on lap 348. Busch radioed to his team that a part on his car had failed. His car got loose going into turn 1, slid down the track, turned back up the track and came to a stop backwards. Justin Allgaier, driving in place of Michael Annett, clipped the left-front of Busch's car. He went up the track and collected Larson and Martin Truex Jr., which brought out the sixth caution. Busch said afterwards that the part failure was "a shame. The last few times we’ve been here, we’ve had really fast M&M’s Toyota Camrys and we haven’t been able to finish. We’ve been having parts failures here, so something we’ve got to address and fix. I’m really tired of losing races here with parts falling apart, so they’ll hear about it on Tuesday." He also said that the "biggest moron out there is the spotter of the 46 and the driver of the 46 (Justin Allgaier). I’ve been wrecking for half a lap and they just come on through and clean us out. That’s stupid, so I don’t know – frustrating day. Let’s go home." Allgaier went on to finish 40th. Kurt Busch assumed the race lead.

The race restarted with 129 laps to go and a multi-car wreck brought out the seventh caution of the race. It started when Busch spun out and collected Brad Keselowski. Matt Kenseth, Paul Menard, Ryan Blaney, Jimmie Johnson and Elliott all suffered damage in the wreck. Busch said afterwards that he thought he "just missed the bottom groove by a few inches, got loose and the wreck was on. The way that our car was restarting it felt comfortable, it felt good. That inside with the rosin and the VHT, if you don’t hit it exactly right you lose a lot of time. I tried to make up for it and got loose. I feel really bad for the Monster Energy guys. We had a win in our sights and I just drove the car at 101 percent instead of that 99 that I probably needed to be at." Joey Logano assumed the race lead.

The race restarted with 111 laps to go. Harvick took the lead back from Logano with 95 laps to go. The eighth caution of the race flew when Clint Bowyer got into the wall. Hamlin exited pit road with the race lead.

The race restarted with 77 laps to go. The ninth caution of the race flew with 55 laps to go for rain. The cars were brought back down pit road as the race was red-flagged for a third time. After six minutes and 54 seconds, the race resumed under caution.

The race restarted with 51 laps. Harvick drove on to score the victory.

== Post-race ==
=== Driver comments ===
Harvick said afterwards that he thought his team had "a good plan. I think we have great cars, and we've made a lot of adjustments. ... Hopefully this win and everything getting ready to start with the Chase is going to put all the pieces together, and I think everybody has been working hard to do that." In regards to the double burnout he did with Tony Stewart following the race, he said he "wanted him to go on a victory lap with so he could say goodbye to all the fans here at Bristol but that was pretty cool doing some burnouts with him."

Stenhouse, who tied a career-best Sprint Cup Series finish with a runner-up finish in a special paint scheme dedicated to the late Bryan Clauson, said afterwards that he "knew we were going to have to get everything perfect, and it took me a minute to get the top going. I wanted to give up when we were two [laps] down, but I remembered we had Bryan Clauson’s tribute car here, and his favorite helmet, and I dug deep and the guys dug deep and made a lost of changes that made our Fastenal Ford a lot better. We really wanted to park it in Victory Lane for his whole family and all of his friends and fans for Tim, Di, Taylor and Lauren his fiancée... Just a little bit short."

Hamlin, who recovered from a speeding penalty and loose wheel to finish third, said he "had a great car. We definitely got it a lot better there at the end and proud that we’re able to come back from two laps down and get a good finish out of it, but still a good overall day for our FedEx Express Camry. Just came up a little short."

== Race results ==
Pos	No.	Driver	Team	Manufacturer	Laps	Points
1	4	Kevin Harvick	Stewart–Haas Racing	Chevrolet	500	44
2	17	Ricky Stenhouse Jr.	Roush Fenway Racing	Ford	500	39
3	11	Denny Hamlin	Joe Gibbs Racing	Toyota	500	39
4	3	Austin Dillon	Richard Childress Racing	Chevrolet	500	37
5	34	Chris Buescher (R)	Front Row Motorsports	Ford	500	36
6	19	Carl Edwards	Joe Gibbs Racing	Toyota	500	36
7	48	Jimmie Johnson	Hendrick Motorsports	Chevrolet	500	34
8	1	Jamie McMurray	Chip Ganassi Racing	Chevrolet	500	33
9	47	A. J. Allmendinger	JTG Daugherty Racing	Chevrolet	500	32
10	22	Joey Logano	Team Penske	Ford	500	32
11	88	Jeff Gordon	Hendrick Motorsports	Chevrolet	500	30
12	6	Trevor Bayne	Roush Fenway Racing	Ford	500	29
13	5	Kasey Kahne	Hendrick Motorsports	Chevrolet	500	28
14	43	Aric Almirola	Richard Petty Motorsports	Ford	500	27
15	24	Chase Elliott (R)	Hendrick Motorsports	Chevrolet	500	27
16	16	Greg Biffle	Roush Fenway Racing	Ford	500	25
17	83	Matt DiBenedetto	BK Racing	Toyota	500	24
18	44	Brian Scott (R)	Richard Petty Motorsports	Ford	499	24
19	95	Michael McDowell	Circle Sport-Leavine Family Racing	Chevrolet	499	22
20	38	Landon Cassill	Front Row Motorsports	Ford	497	21
21	23	David Ragan	BK Racing	Toyota	497	20
22	10	Danica Patrick	Stewart–Haas Racing	Chevrolet	496	19
23	78	Martin Truex Jr.	Furniture Row Racing	Toyota	496	18
24	42	Kyle Larson	Chip Ganassi Racing	Chevrolet	495	17
25	13	Casey Mears	Germain Racing	Chevrolet	495	16
26	7	Regan Smith	Tommy Baldwin Racing	Chevrolet	491	15
27	55	Reed Sorenson	Premium Motorsports	Chevrolet	489	14
28	31	Ryan Newman	Richard Childress Racing	Chevrolet	487	14
29	32	Jeffrey Earnhardt (R)	Go FAS Racing	Ford	479	12
30	14	Tony Stewart	Stewart–Haas Racing	Chevrolet	471	11
31	15	Clint Bowyer	HScott Motorsports	Chevrolet	470	10
32	27	Paul Menard	Richard Childress Racing	Chevrolet	458	9
33	2	Brad Keselowski	Team Penske	Ford	458	8
34	98	Cole Whitt	Premium Motorsports	Chevrolet	442	7
35	21	Ryan Blaney (R)	Wood Brothers Racing	Ford	437	6
36	30	Josh Wise	The Motorsports Group	Chevrolet	416	5
37	20	Matt Kenseth	Joe Gibbs Racing	Toyota	373	4
38	41	Kurt Busch	Stewart–Haas Racing	Chevrolet	372	3
39	18	Kyle Busch	Joe Gibbs Racing	Toyota	357	4
40	46	Justin Allgaier (i)	HScott Motorsports	Chevrolet	354	0
Official race results

=== Race summary ===
- Lead changes: 8 among different drivers
- Cautions/Laps: 9 for 106
- Red flags: 3 for 18 hours, 21 minutes and 4 seconds
- Time of race: 3 hours, 25 minutes and 5 seconds
- Average speed: 77.968 miles per hour (125.477 km/h)

== Media ==
=== Television ===
NBC Sports covered the race on the television side. Rick Allen, Jeff Burton and Steve Letarte had the call in the booth for the race. Dave Burns, Parker Kligerman, Mike Massaro and Marty Snider reported from pit lane during the race.

NBCSN CNBC
Booth announcers	Pit reporters
Lap-by-lap: Rick Allen; Color-commentator: Jeff Burton; Color-commentator: Steve Letarte	Dave Burns; Parker Kligerman; Mike Massaro; Marty Snider

=== Radio ===
The Performance Racing Network had the radio call for the race, which was simulcast on Sirius XM NASCAR Radio.

PRN
Booth announcers	Turn announcers	Pit reporters
Lead announcer: Doug Rice; Announcer: Mark Garrow; Announcer: Wendy Venturini	Backstretch: Rob Albright	Brad Gillie; Brett McMillan; Jim Noble; Steve Richards

== Standings after the race ==
Drivers' Championship standings
	Pos	Manufacturer	Points
1	1	Kevin Harvick	762
1	2	Brad Keselowski	735 (–27)
	3	Kurt Busch	692 (–70)
1	4	Carl Edwards	689 (–73)
1	5	Joey Logano	684 (–78)
2	6	Kyle Busch	674 (–88)
	7	Denny Hamlin	659 (–103)
	8	Martin Truex Jr.	630 (–132)
1	9	Jimmie Johnson	612 (–150)
1	10	Matt Kenseth	604 (–158)
2	11	Austin Dillon	596 (–166)
	12	Chase Elliott	588 (–174)
1	13	Jamie McMurray	583 (–179)
3	14	Ryan Newman	576 (–186)
1	15	Trevor Bayne	541 (–221)
1	16	Kyle Larson	537 (–225)
Official drivers' standings

Manufacturers' Championship standings
Pos	Manufacturer	Points
1	Toyota	949
2	Chevrolet	919 (–30)
3	Ford	882 (–67)
Official manufacturers' standings

- Note: Only the first 16 positions are included for the driver standings.
  . – Driver has clinched a position in the Chase for the Sprint Cup.

Previous race: 2016 Cheez-It 355 at The Glen	Sprint Cup Series; 2016 season	Next race: 2016 Pure Michigan 400
