= Kathryn Albertson =

American philanthropist (1908–2002)

- Born: Kathryn McCurry; August 27, 1908; Boise, Idaho, U.S.
- Died: April 30, 2002 (aged 93); Boise, Idaho, U.S.
- Resting place: Morris Hill Cemetery; Boise, Idaho
- Education: College of Idaho
- Known for: Philanthropist, wife of Albertsons founder Joe Albertson
- Spouse: Joe Albertson (m. 1930–1993)
- Children: 1
- Relatives: Brian Scott (great-grandson)
- Website: J.A. & Kathryn Albertson Foundation

Kathryn McCurry Albertson (August 27, 1908 – April 30, 2002) was the wife of the founder of the Albertsons chain of grocery stores and a notable philanthropist.

== Biography ==
Born Kathryn McCurry in Boise, Idaho on August 27, 1908, she was the daughter of Neunan and Ida Mae McCurry. She attended school in the Boise school system and after graduation from Boise High School, she enrolled at the College of Idaho in Caldwell, where, in chemistry class, she met Joe Albertson. They married on New Years Day in 1930.

Kathryn Albertson also founded a local sorority during her time in the College of Idaho called Sigma Epsilon. It was founded on January 5, 1923.

Together, they started the grocery store chain that bears their name (Albertsons). Kathryn was there for Joe and for their daughter, Barbara, as the store they created grew to be one of the largest supermarket chains in America.

When Joe died in 1993, Kathryn remained active on the Albertson Corporation Board of Directors for several more years. In 1998, the company honored her by designating her Albertson's first Director Emeritus, an honorary lifetime position on the board of directors.

== J.A. and Kathryn Albertson Foundation ==
Kathryn and Joe believed strongly that “once you make it, you need to give back.” Together, they began to give to a number of charitable causes, often to help students who wanted to further their education. In 1966, they created the J.A. and Kathryn Albertson Foundation to help administer their personal giving.

A 41-acre (17 ha) walking park in Boise along the Boise River bears her name, a gift to the city from her husband in 1989.

== Death ==
Kathryn died at age 93 on April 30, 2002, and is interred next to her husband at Morris Hill Cemetery in Boise.
