= 2014 NASCAR Sprint Cup Series =

American motorsport season

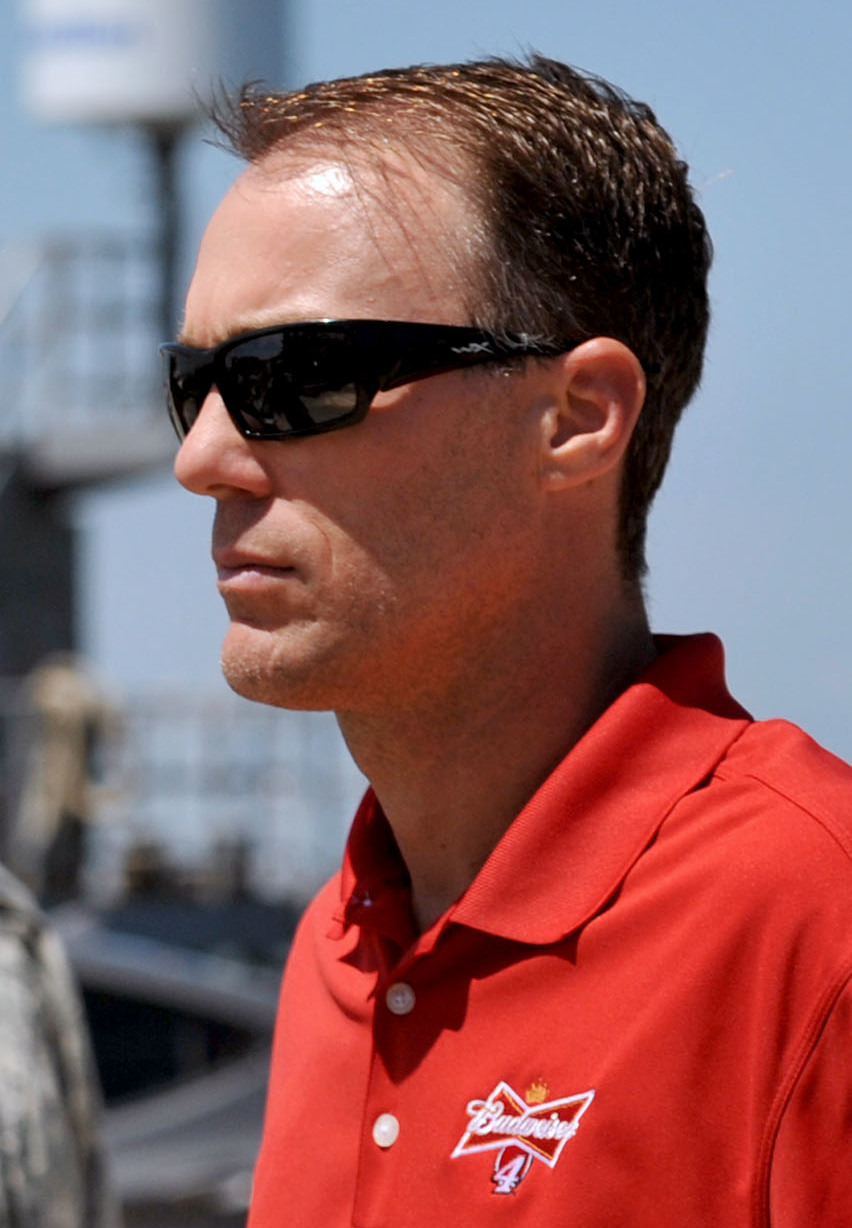
Kevin Harvick, the 2014 Sprint Cup Series champion

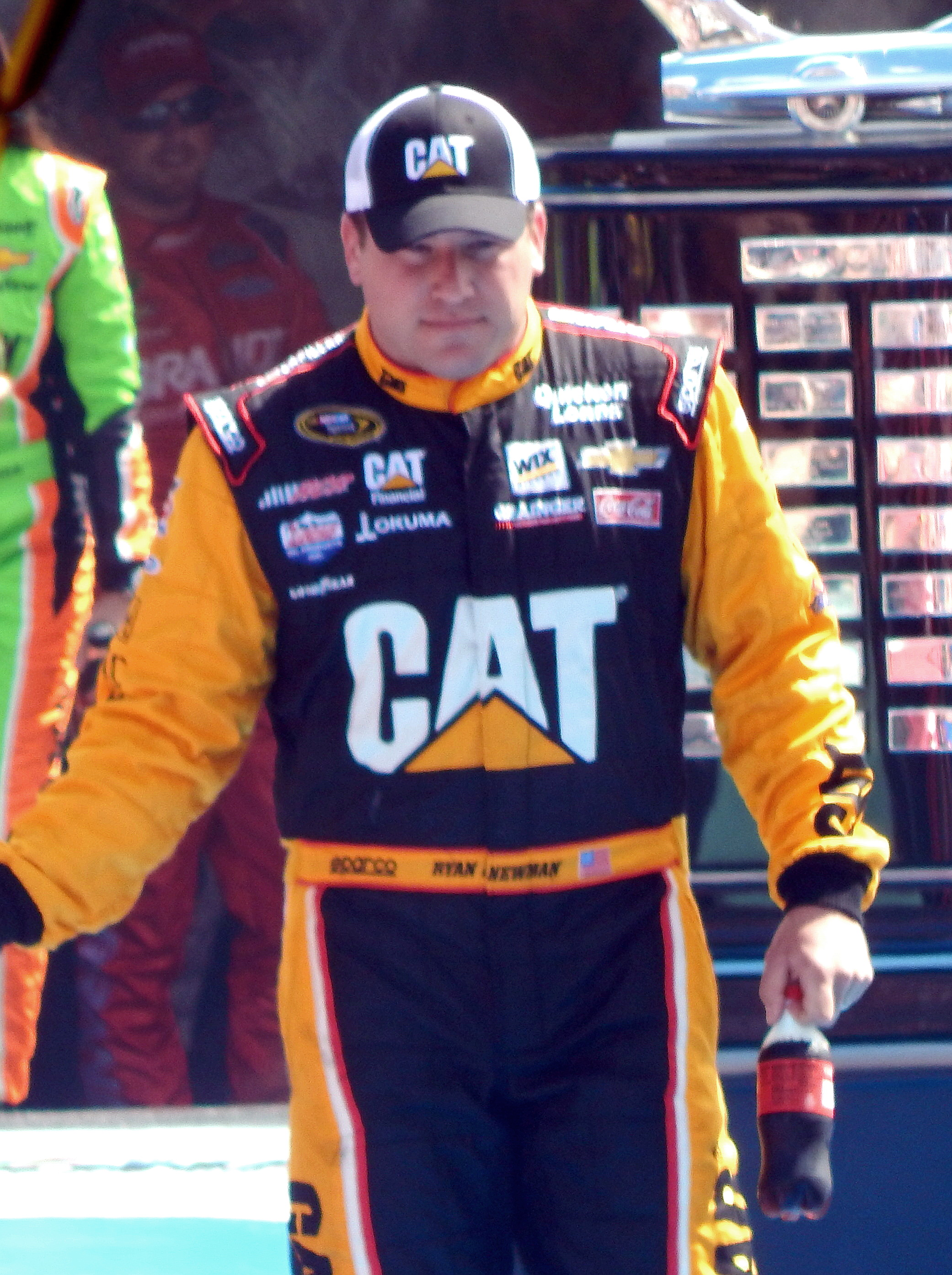
Ryan Newman finished 1 point behind Harvick in second place

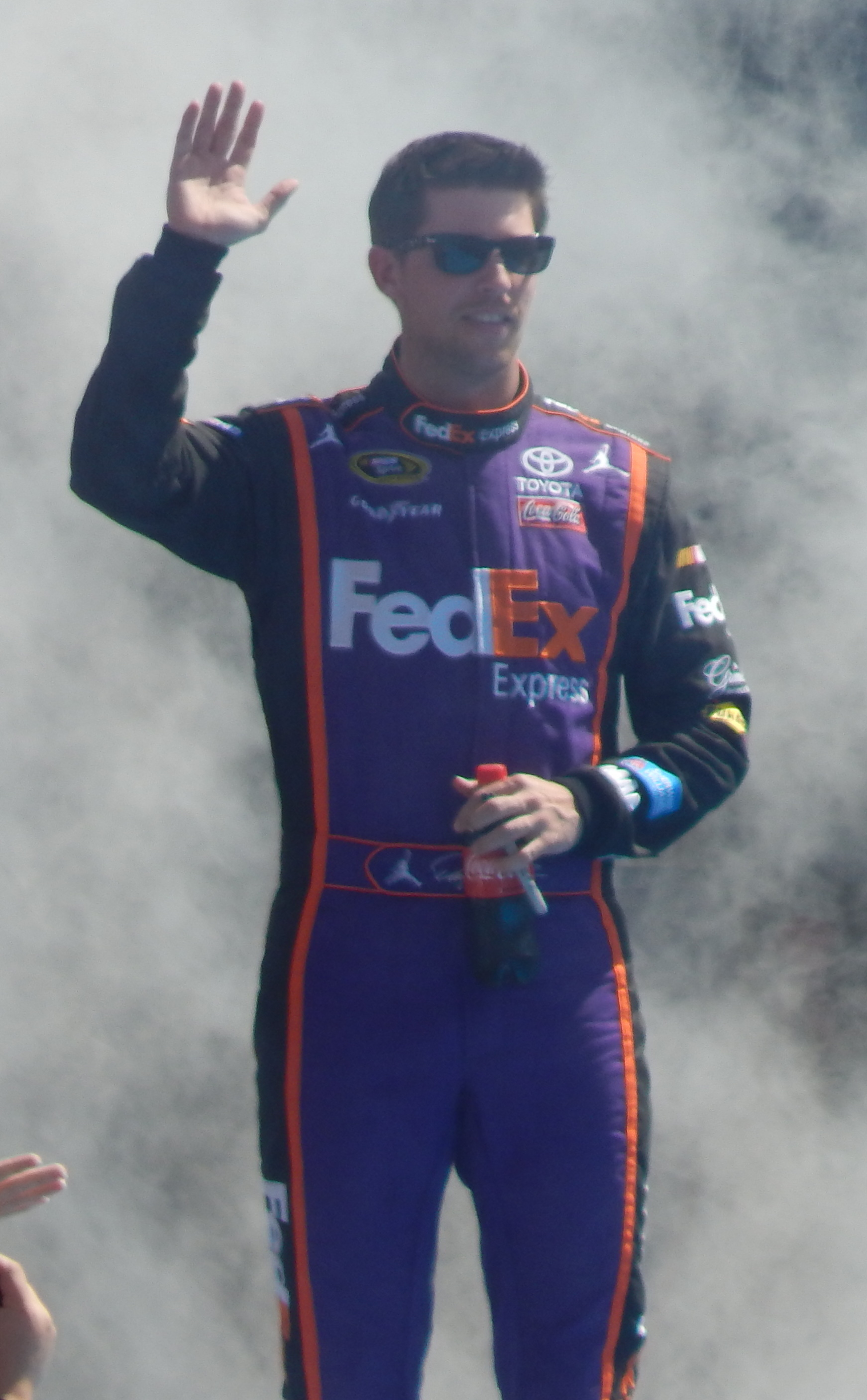
Denny Hamlin finished 6 points behind Harvick in third place

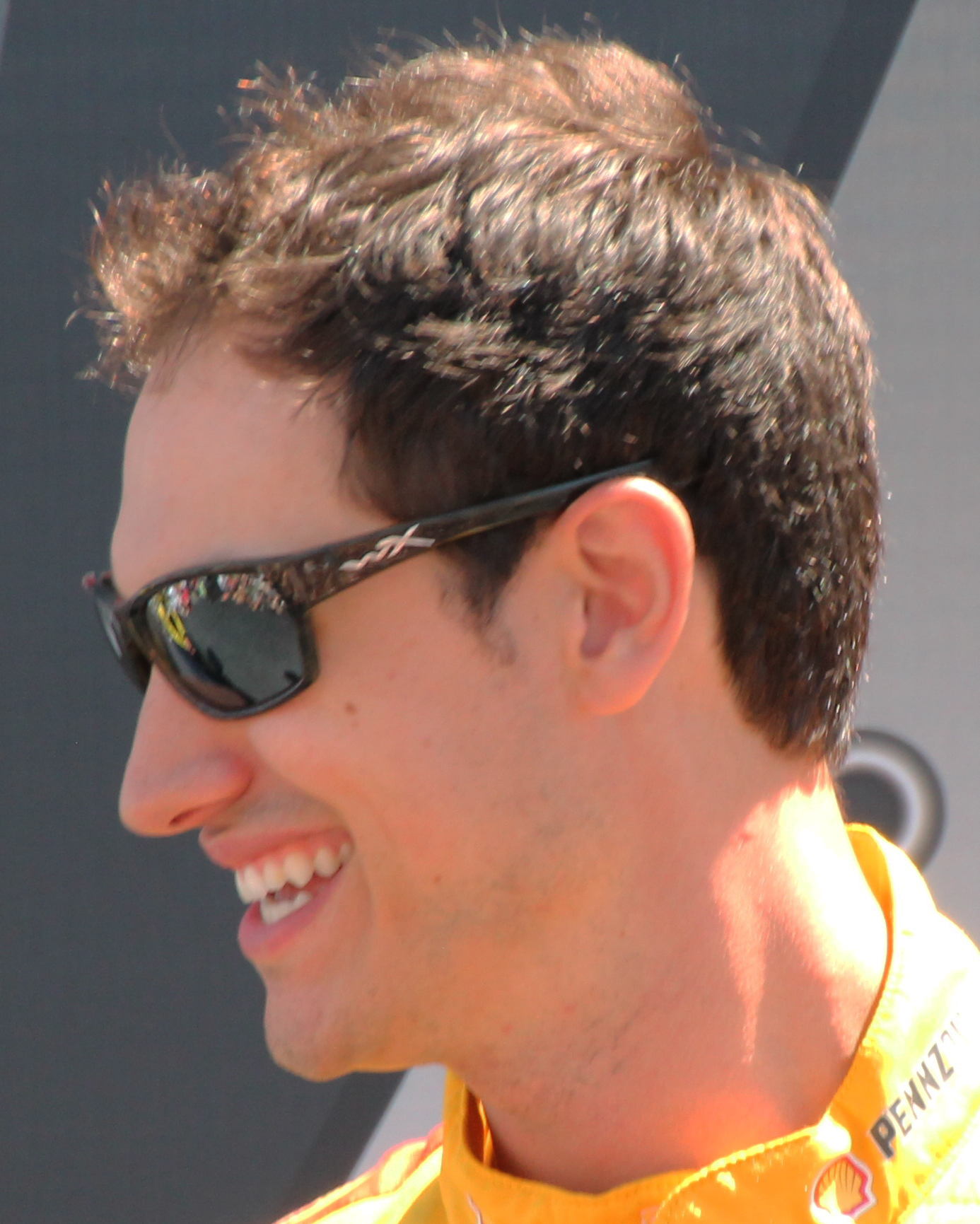
Joey Logano finished 15 points behind Harvick in fourth place

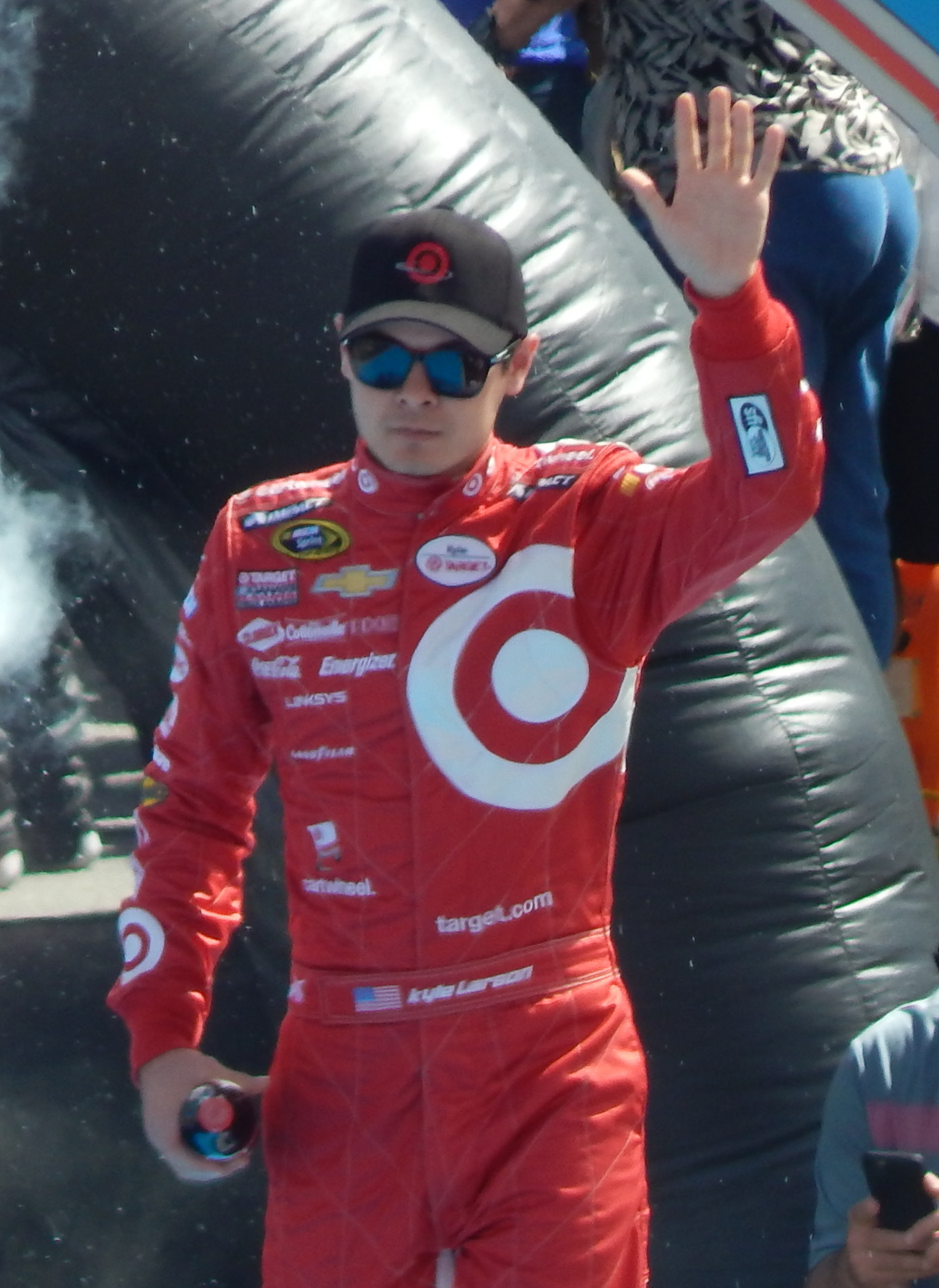
Kyle Larson, the 2014 NASCAR Rookie of the Year.

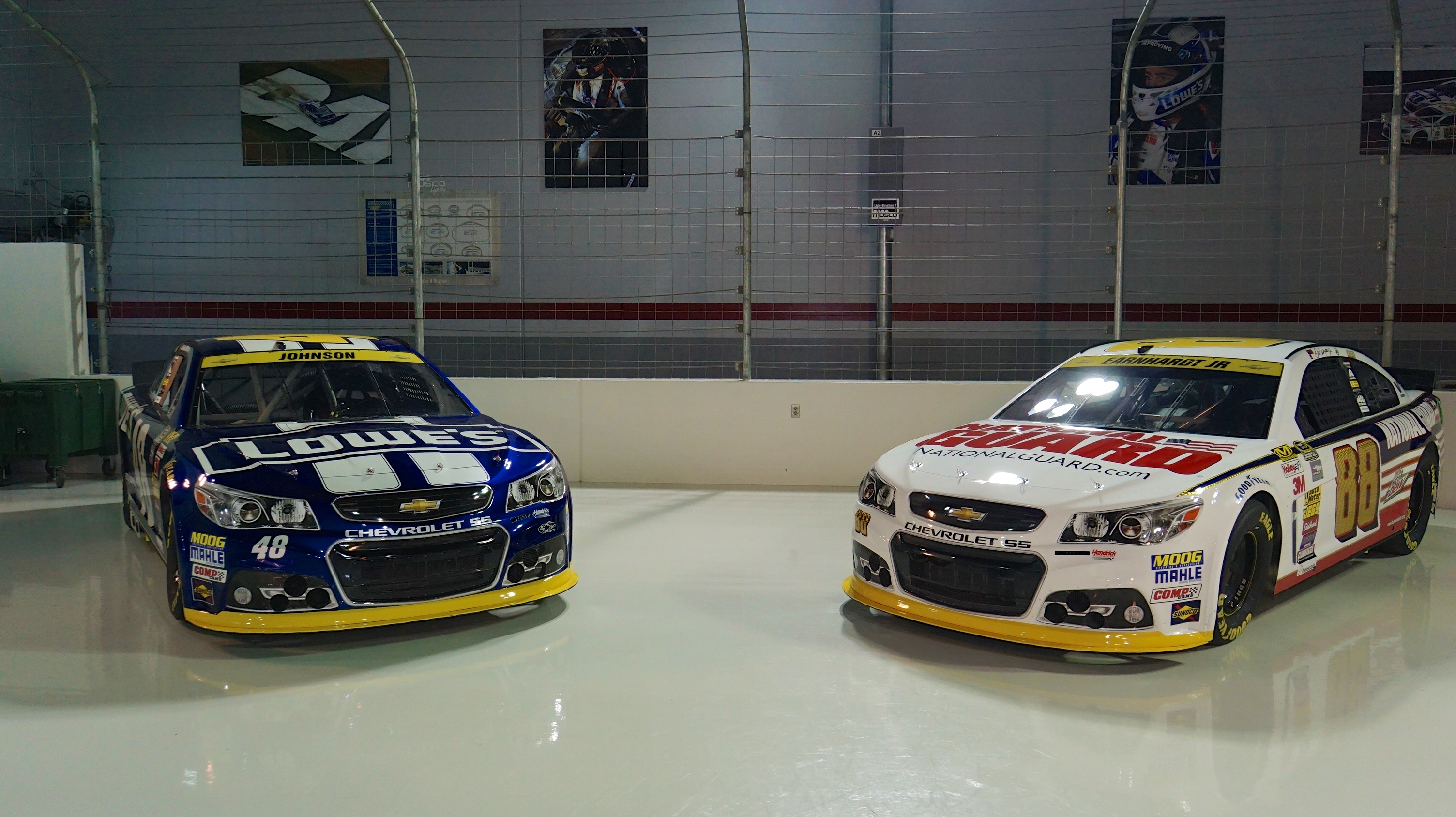
Chevrolet won the Manufacturer's championship with 20 wins & 1572 points.

The 2014 NASCAR Sprint Cup Series was the 66th season of professional stock car racing in the United States and the 43rd modern-era Cup season. The season began at Daytona International Speedway, with the Sprint Unlimited, followed by the Daytona 500. The season ended with the Ford EcoBoost 400 at Homestead-Miami Speedway.

This season was the final year of broadcasting for both the ESPN family of networks and Turner Sports. ESPN had covered the second half of the Sprint Cup season since 2007 while Turner Sports ended a thirty-one year relationship with NASCAR on TBS and later TNT. For 2015, their portions of the season were divided between Fox Sports and NBC.

Kevin Harvick and Stewart–Haas Racing claimed the drivers' championship and owners' championship, while Chevrolet won the manufacturer's championship. In one of the largest rookie classes in recent history, future Cup Series champion Kyle Larson was named Rookie of the Year.

== Teams and drivers ==
=== Complete schedule ===
There were 41 full-time teams in 2014.

Manufacturer	Team	No.	Race Driver	Crew Chief
Chevrolet	Chip Ganassi Racing	1	Jamie McMurray	Keith Rodden
Chevrolet	Chip Ganassi Racing	42	Kyle Larson (R)	Chris Heroy
Chevrolet	Furniture Row Racing	78	Martin Truex Jr.	Todd Berrier
Chevrolet	Germain Racing	13	Casey Mears	Bootie Barker
Chevrolet	Hendrick Motorsports	5	Kasey Kahne	Kenny Francis
Chevrolet	Hendrick Motorsports	24	Jeff Gordon	Alan Gustafson
Chevrolet	Hendrick Motorsports	48	Jimmie Johnson	Chad Knaus
Chevrolet	Hendrick Motorsports	88	Dale Earnhardt Jr.	Steve Letarte
Chevrolet	HScott Motorsports	51	Justin Allgaier (R)	Steve Addington
Chevrolet	JTG Daugherty Racing	47	A. J. Allmendinger	Brian Burns
Chevrolet	Richard Childress Racing	3	Austin Dillon (R)	Gil Martin
Chevrolet	Richard Childress Racing	27	Paul Menard	Slugger Labbe 31; Justin Alexander 5
Chevrolet	Richard Childress Racing	31	Ryan Newman	Luke Lambert
Chevrolet	Richard Childress Racing	33	Brian Scott 6	Nick Harrison 7 Mark Hillman 15; Mike Hillman Jr. 14
Chevrolet	Richard Childress Racing	33	Ty Dillon 2	Nick Harrison 7 Mark Hillman 15; Mike Hillman Jr. 14
Chevrolet	Hillman-Circle Sport LLC	33	Timmy Hill 6	Nick Harrison 7 Mark Hillman 15; Mike Hillman Jr. 14
Chevrolet	Hillman-Circle Sport LLC	33	David Stremme 12	Nick Harrison 7 Mark Hillman 15; Mike Hillman Jr. 14
Chevrolet	Hillman-Circle Sport LLC	33	Alex Kennedy 5	Nick Harrison 7 Mark Hillman 15; Mike Hillman Jr. 14
Chevrolet	Hillman-Circle Sport LLC	33	Bobby Labonte 1	Nick Harrison 7 Mark Hillman 15; Mike Hillman Jr. 14
Chevrolet	Hillman-Circle Sport LLC	33	Morgan Shepherd 1	Nick Harrison 7 Mark Hillman 15; Mike Hillman Jr. 14
Chevrolet	Hillman-Circle Sport LLC	33	Travis Kvapil 3	Nick Harrison 7 Mark Hillman 15; Mike Hillman Jr. 14
Chevrolet	Hillman-Circle Sport LLC	40	Landon Cassill	Mike Abner 19; Mark Hillman 17
Chevrolet	Stewart–Haas Racing	4	Kevin Harvick	Rodney Childers
Chevrolet	Stewart–Haas Racing	10	Danica Patrick	Tony Gibson 33; Daniel Knost 3
Chevrolet	Stewart–Haas Racing	14	Tony Stewart 33	Chad Johnston
Chevrolet	Stewart–Haas Racing	14	Regan Smith 1	Chad Johnston
Chevrolet	Stewart–Haas Racing	14	Jeff Burton 2	Chad Johnston
Chevrolet	Stewart–Haas Racing	41	Kurt Busch	Daniel Knost 33; Tony Gibson 3
Chevrolet	Tommy Baldwin Racing	7	Michael Annett (R)	Kevin Manion
Chevrolet	Tommy Baldwin Racing	36	Reed Sorenson	Todd Parrott
Ford	Front Row Motorsports	34	David Ragan	Jay Guy 30; Derrick Finley 6
Ford	Front Row Motorsports	38	David Gilliland	Frank Kerr 30; Jay Guy 6
Ford	Go FAS Racing	32	Terry Labonte 4	Dan Stillman 11; Ben Leslie 19; Clinton Cram 6
Ford	Go FAS Racing	32	Travis Kvapil 16	Dan Stillman 11; Ben Leslie 19; Clinton Cram 6
Ford	Go FAS Racing	32	Blake Koch 4	Dan Stillman 11; Ben Leslie 19; Clinton Cram 6
Ford	Go FAS Racing	32	Boris Said 2	Dan Stillman 11; Ben Leslie 19; Clinton Cram 6
Ford	Go FAS Racing	32	Eddie MacDonald 1	Dan Stillman 11; Ben Leslie 19; Clinton Cram 6
Ford	Go FAS Racing	32	J. J. Yeley 3	Dan Stillman 11; Ben Leslie 19; Clinton Cram 6
Ford	Go FAS Racing	32	Joey Gase 4	Dan Stillman 11; Ben Leslie 19; Clinton Cram 6
Ford	Go FAS Racing	32	Timmy Hill 1	Dan Stillman 11; Ben Leslie 19; Clinton Cram 6
Ford	Go FAS Racing	32	Kyle Fowler 1	Dan Stillman 11; Ben Leslie 19; Clinton Cram 6
Ford	Richard Petty Motorsports	9	Marcos Ambrose	Drew Blickensderfer
Ford	Richard Petty Motorsports	43	Aric Almirola	Trent Owens
Ford	Roush Fenway Racing	16	Greg Biffle	Matt Puccia
Ford	Roush Fenway Racing	17	Ricky Stenhouse Jr.	Mike Kelley
Ford	Roush Fenway Racing	99	Carl Edwards	Jimmy Fennig
Ford	Team Penske	2	Brad Keselowski	Paul Wolfe 35; Greg Erwin 1
Ford	Team Penske	22	Joey Logano	Todd Gordon
Toyota	BK Racing	23	Alex Bowman (R)	Dave Winston
Toyota	BK Racing	26	Cole Whitt (R)	Randy Cox
Toyota	BK Racing	83	Ryan Truex (R) 26	Dale Ferguson 8 Doug Richert 6 Joe Williams 22
Toyota	BK Racing	83	J. J. Yeley 8	Dale Ferguson 8 Doug Richert 6 Joe Williams 22
Toyota	BK Racing	83	Travis Kvapil 2	Dale Ferguson 8 Doug Richert 6 Joe Williams 22
Toyota	Identity Ventures Racing 30; Michael Waltrip Racing 6	66	Michael Waltrip 4	Chad Walter 6 Scott Eggleston 30
Toyota	Identity Ventures Racing 30; Michael Waltrip Racing 6	66	Joe Nemechek 15	Chad Walter 6 Scott Eggleston 30
Toyota	Identity Ventures Racing 30; Michael Waltrip Racing 6	66	Jeff Burton 2	Chad Walter 6 Scott Eggleston 30
Toyota	Identity Ventures Racing 30; Michael Waltrip Racing 6	66	Brett Moffitt 8	Chad Walter 6 Scott Eggleston 30
Toyota	Identity Ventures Racing 30; Michael Waltrip Racing 6	66	Timmy Hill 1	Chad Walter 6 Scott Eggleston 30
Toyota	Identity Ventures Racing 30; Michael Waltrip Racing 6	66	Tomy Drissi 1	Chad Walter 6 Scott Eggleston 30
Toyota	Identity Ventures Racing 30; Michael Waltrip Racing 6	66	Mike Wallace 5	Chad Walter 6 Scott Eggleston 30
Toyota	Joe Gibbs Racing	11	Denny Hamlin 35	Darian Grubb 30; Mike Wheeler 6
Toyota	Joe Gibbs Racing	11	Sam Hornish Jr. 1	Darian Grubb 30; Mike Wheeler 6
Toyota	Joe Gibbs Racing	18	Kyle Busch	Dave Rogers
Toyota	Joe Gibbs Racing	20	Matt Kenseth	Jason Ratcliff
Toyota	Michael Waltrip Racing	15	Clint Bowyer	Brian Pattie
Toyota	Michael Waltrip Racing	55	Brian Vickers	Billy Scott
Ford 5 Chevrolet 31	Phil Parsons Racing	98	Josh Wise	Gene Nead

=== Limited schedule ===
Manufacturer	Team	No.	Race Driver	Crew Chief	Round(s)
Chevrolet	Beard Motorsports	75	Clay Rogers	Darren Shaw	2
Chevrolet	HScott Motorsports	52	Bobby Labonte	Jimmy Elledge	1
Chevrolet	Team XTREME Racing	44	J. J. Yeley	Walter Giles 1 Joe Lax 1 Steve Lane 8	10
Chevrolet	Team XTREME Racing	44	Timmy Hill	Peter Sospenzo	2
Chevrolet	Tommy Baldwin Racing	37	Bobby Labonte	Tommy Baldwin Jr.	1
Chevrolet	Tommy Baldwin Racing	37	Dave Blaney	Zach McGowan	3
Chevrolet	Tommy Baldwin Racing	37	Mike Bliss	Zach McGowan	6
Ford	Front Row Motorsports	35	Eric McClure	Todd Anderson 8 Derrick Finley 2	2
Ford	Front Row Motorsports	35	Blake Koch	Todd Anderson 8 Derrick Finley 2	2
Ford	Front Row Motorsports	35	David Reutimann	Todd Anderson 8 Derrick Finley 2	6
Ford	Leavine Family Racing	95	Michael McDowell	Wally Rogers	22
Ford	Randy Humphrey Racing	77	Dave Blaney	Peter Sospenzo	12
Ford	Randy Humphrey Racing	77	Nelson Piquet Jr.	Steve Lane	1
Ford	Randy Humphrey Racing	77	Joe Nemechek	Steve Lane	1
Ford	Randy Humphrey Racing	77	Corey LaJoie	Steve Lane	2
Ford	Roush Fenway Racing	6	Trevor Bayne	Bob Osborne	1
Ford	Team Penske	12	Ryan Blaney	Jeremy Bullins	2
Ford	Team Penske	12	Juan Pablo Montoya	Greg Erwin	2
Ford	Wood Brothers Racing	21	Trevor Bayne	Donnie Wingo	12
Toyota	BK Racing	93	Morgan Shepherd	Rick Ren	1
Toyota	BK Racing	93	Mike Bliss	Doug Richert	2
Toyota	BK Racing	93	Johnny Sauter	Doug Richert	1
Toyota	BK Racing	93	J. J. Yeley	Doug Richert	1
Toyota	BK Racing	93	Clay Rogers	Doug Richert	2
Toyota	Identity Ventures Racing	49	Mike Wallace	Scott Eggleston	1
Toyota	Identity Ventures Racing	87	Joe Nemechek	Scott Eggleston	3
Toyota	Identity Ventures Racing	87	Morgan Shepherd	Scott Eggleston	1
Toyota	Identity Ventures Racing	87	Timmy Hill	Scott Eggleston	1
Toyota	RAB Racing	29	Joe Nemechek	Chris Rice 2 Matt Lucas 1	2
Toyota	RAB Racing	29	Matt Crafton	Chris Rice 2 Matt Lucas 1	1
Toyota	Swan Racing	30	Parker Kligerman	Steve Lane	8

=== Changes ===
==== Teams ====
- Stewart–Haas Racing expanded to a four-car team with the addition of Kurt Busch in the No. 41. Busch previously drove the No. 78 Chevrolet for Furniture Row Racing in 2013.
- Michael Waltrip Racing downsized from a three to two car team for 2014, when sponsor NAPA Auto Parts decided to terminate their 3-year deal after the race fixing incident at the 2013 Richmond September race, shutting down the No. 56 Toyota Camry of Martin Truex Jr.
- With the No. 56 shut down, Michael Waltrip entered a partnership with the 2013 No. 87 NEMCO Motorsports team, to the new formed Identity Ventures Racing in the No. 66 with Waltrip running the restrictor plate races and Joe Nemechek and various drivers running the remainder of the races.
- Front Row Motorsports downsized from three full-time teams to two-full-time teams with the No. 35 moving to part-time. The team attempted 10 races in 2014.
- Hillman-Circle Sport LLC expanded to two full-time teams with Landon Cassill running the full season in the new No. 40, after running part-time for the team in 2013.
- Swan Racing expanded to a two-car team with the addition of Cole Whitt in the No. 26, who previously ran 7 races in Swan Racing's No. 30 in 2013. Parker Kligerman took over in the No. 30 for Swan Racing, previously running 2 races in the car in 2013. Sponsorship troubles later forced Swan Racing to sell both their cars to other teams in April 2014. The No. 26 of Whitt was sold to BK Racing, who continued to run full-time, while the No. 30 assets were sold to Xxxtreme Motorsport, shutting down the No. 30 and releasing Kligerman.

==== Drivers ====
- Kevin Harvick replaced Ryan Newman in the Stewart–Haas Racing No. 39, which was renumbered to No. 4. Harvick previously drove for Richard Childress Racing in the No. 29 the previous 12 years.
- Austin Dillon moved up to the Sprint Cup Series full-time to replace Kevin Harvick in the Richard Childress Racing No. 29, renumbered to No. 3. Announced December 11, 2013, this would make the first appearance of No. 3 in the Sprint Cup Series since the 2001 Daytona 500 and the death of Dale Earnhardt. Dillon had built a strong early career in a Childress-blessed No. 3, first in the Camping World Truck Series, then in the Nationwide Series. Childress had polled fans at the beginning of 2013 about Dillon taking No. 3, to the Sprint Cup series, which received 90% positive feedback. "That told me it was time, and if Austin wanted to it was his choice."
- Ryan Newman replaced Jeff Burton in the Richard Childress Racing No. 31. Newman drove the No. 39 for Stewart–Haas Racing in 2013.
- Martin Truex Jr. replaced Kurt Busch in the Furniture Row Racing No. 78. Truex drove the No. 56 for Michael Waltrip Racing in 2013.
- Brian Vickers became the full-time driver of the No. 55 for Michael Waltrip Racing, after running 14 races in the car in 2013.
- Kyle Larson replaced Juan Pablo Montoya in the Earnhardt Ganassi Racing No. 42. Montoya left to drive in the IndyCar Series. Larson ran full-time for Turner Scott Motorsports in the No. 32 in the Nationwide Series in 2013.
- A. J. Allmendinger replaced Bobby Labonte in the JTG Daugherty Racing No. 47 car. Allmendinger ran part-time for Daughtery and Phoenix Racing in 2013.
- Justin Allgaier replaced multiple drivers in the HScott Motorsports No. 51 car. Allgaier ran full-time for Turner Scott Motorsports in the No. 31 in the Nationwide Series in 2013.
- Michael Annett replaced Dave Blaney in the Tommy Baldwin Racing No. 7 car. Annett ran in the Nationwide Series for Richard Petty Motorsports in the No. 43 in 2013.
- Reed Sorenson replaced J. J. Yeley in the Tommy Baldwin Racing No. 36 car. Sorenson ran part-time for various Sprint Cup and Nationwide teams in 2013.
- Josh Wise replaced Michael McDowell in the Phil Parsons Racing No. 98. Wise drove for Front Row Motorsports in the No. 35 in 2013.
- Travis Kvapil and various drivers join Go FAS Racing, a team consisting of Go Green Racing and Frank Stoddard's FAS Lane Racing, for races that are not road courses (Boris Said) or restrictor plate superspeedways (Terry Labonte).
- Alex Bowman replaced Travis Kvapil in the BK Racing No. 93 car, which was renumbered to No. 23. Bowman drove for RAB Racing in the No. 99 in the Nationwide Series in 2013.
- Ryan Truex replaced David Reutimann in the BK Racing No. 83 car. Truex left after the Chicagoland race in September and was replaced by J. J. Yeley and Travis Kvapil.
- Michael McDowell replaced Scott Speed and various drivers in the part-time Leavine Family Racing No. 95 car. McDowell drove the Phil Parsons Racing No. 98 in 2013.
- J. J. Yeley replaced Scott Riggs for Xxxtreme Motorsport in the part-time No. 44.

==== Manufacturers ====
- Germain Racing switched its manufacturer to Chevrolet after being with Ford since 2012. The team's original manufacturer was Toyota.

== Changes ==
In contrast to previous seasons, NASCAR imposed several new rules changes that drastically altered how the circuit operates.

=== Rules changes ===
Beginning this year, NASCAR eliminated traditional single car qualifying in its top 3 series for all races except the Daytona 500, the Mudsummer Classic, and non-points events. Qualifying will now be done in a Formula One-style knockout qualifying. For all tracks larger than 1.25 miles in length, qualifying will consist of all entered cars on track for 25 minutes. The fastest 24 move onto a 10-minute session, while the final 12 drivers compete for the overall pole in a 5-minute session. For tracks shorter than 1.25 miles as well as road courses, all entered cars will qualify in a 30-minute session, while the 12 fastest will compete in a final 10 minute session. A similar system involving groups of cars being released at five-second intervals was used at Sonoma Raceway and Watkins Glen International in 2013.

The rule was modified slightly for restrictor plate races (other than the Daytona 500, which maintains its single car pole qualifying and Budweiser Duel qualifying races) beginning at Talladega in the October race. During sessions at restrictor plate tracks, such as at Talladega's spring race, drivers had either ridden around the track at slow speeds or stopped on pit road for several minutes to avoid aiding others in the draft. In an effort to avoid this, a new procedure was implemented:

- NASCAR will randomly split the field into two groups for session 1. Each group will get 5 minutes of track time. The fastest 24 cars from either group will advance to session 2.
- These 24 cars will get 5 minutes of track time for session 2. The fastest 12 cars in session 2 will advance to session 3.
- Session 3 remains unchanged: 12 cars competing for overall pole in a 5-minute session.
- Statically set car at race ride height—eliminate pre- and post-race front height rules and inspection.
- The use of a front splitter with a square leading edge.
- Skirts at 4-inch minimum ground clearance on both the left and right sides.
- Rear fascia trimmed 1.375 inches higher in current scallop region.
- The use of a .750-inch higher 8-inch high rear spoiler except at Daytona and Talladega.
- The use of a 43-inch wide by 13-inch long radiator pan.

==== New Chase format ====
On January 30, 2014, NASCAR announced radical changes to the format for the season-ending Chase for the Sprint Cup.

- The group of drivers in the Chase will now officially be called the NASCAR Sprint Cup Chase Grid.
- The number of drivers qualifying for the Chase Grid will expand from 12 to 16.
- 15 of the 16 slots in the Chase Grid are reserved for the drivers with the most race wins over the first 26 races, provided that said drivers are in the top 30 in series points and have attempted to qualify for each race (with rare exceptions). The remaining spot is reserved for the points leader after 26 races, if that driver does not have a victory. If fewer than 16 drivers have wins in the first 26 races, the remaining Chase Grid spots are filled by winless drivers in order of season points. As in the recent past, all drivers on the Chase Grid have their driver points reset to 2,000 prior to the Chase, with a 3-point bonus for each win in the first 26 races.
- The Chase will be divided into four rounds. After each of the first three rounds, the four Chase Grid drivers with the fewest season points are eliminated from the Grid and championship contention. Any driver on the Chase Grid who wins a race in the first three rounds automatically advances to the next round. Also, all drivers eliminated from the Chase have their points readjusted to the regular-season points scheme.
  - Challenger Round (races 27–29)
    - Begins with 16 drivers, each with 2,000 points plus a 3-point bonus for each win in the first 26 races.
  - Contender Round (races 30–32)
    - Begins with 12 drivers, each with 3,000 points.
  - Eliminator Round (races 33–35)
    - Begins with 8 drivers, each with 4,000 points.
  - NASCAR Sprint Cup Championship (final race)
    - The last 4 drivers in contention for the season title start the race at 5,000 points, with the highest finisher in the race winning the Cup Series title.

=== 2014 NASCAR realignment ===
The 2014 schedule had a few changes from the 2013 schedule, all of them among the first fifteen races. The dates for the spring races at Darlington Raceway and Kansas Speedway (Bojangles' Southern 500 and 5-hour Energy 400 respectively) were swapped, giving Kansas its first primetime Sprint Cup race, Texas Motor Speedway's spring race was changed from a Saturday night to a Sunday afternoon race for this year only due to conflicts with the NCAA basketball finals, it and Martinsville Speedway's STP 500 were moved up a week, the new Darlington date moved to Texas's original spot on the schedule, and the spring off-weekend moved to Kansas' original date, to coincide with Easter.

=== Other changes ===
NASCAR restructured the penalties and appeals system allowing penalties to be more consistent. The appeals process also makes NASCAR's basis for issuing the penalty public at the first appeal instead of the last. Minor changes were made to the Gen-6 race car. Rules on ride height were loosened, and the top of the rear spoiler is now made of clear material to give drivers more visibility. After a six-hour delay at the first Chase race in 2013 at Chicagoland, NASCAR will now make the Air Titan available at all Sprint Cup Series races and accompanying races at no extra charge. The Air Titan has also been improved to Air Titan 2.0 shortening track drying time even further.

In addition, starting in 2014, drivers have a winner's decal placed behind the driver's name on the side of the car for each race victory they earn during the season.

== Schedule ==
The final calendar was released on October 15, 2013, comprising 36 races, as well as two exhibition races. The schedule also includes two Budweiser Duels, which are the qualifying races for the Daytona 500.

No.	Race title	Track	Date	Time (ET)
	Sprint Unlimited	Daytona International Speedway, Daytona Beach	February 15	8:00 PM
	Budweiser Duels	Daytona International Speedway, Daytona Beach	February 20	7:00 PM
1	Daytona 500	Daytona International Speedway, Daytona Beach	February 23	1:00 PM
2	The Profit on CNBC 500	Phoenix International Raceway, Avondale	March 2	3:00 PM
3	Kobalt 400	Las Vegas Motor Speedway, Las Vegas	March 9	3:00 PM
4	Food City 500	Bristol Motor Speedway, Bristol	March 16	1:00 PM
5	Auto Club 400	Auto Club Speedway, Fontana	March 23	3:00 PM
6	STP 500	Martinsville Speedway, Ridgeway	March 30	1:00 PM
7	Duck Commander 500	Texas Motor Speedway, Fort Worth	April 7†	12:00 PM
8	Bojangles' Southern 500	Darlington Raceway, Darlington	April 12	6:30 PM
9	Toyota Owners 400	Richmond International Raceway, Richmond	April 26	7:00 PM
10	Aaron's 499	Talladega Superspeedway, Talladega	May 4	1:00 PM
11	5-hour Energy 400	Kansas Speedway, Kansas City	May 10	7:30 PM
	Sprint Showdown	Charlotte Motor Speedway, Concord	May 16	7:00 PM
	NASCAR Sprint All-Star Race	Charlotte Motor Speedway, Concord	May 17	9:10 PM
12	Coca-Cola 600	Charlotte Motor Speedway, Concord	May 25	6:00 PM
13	FedEx 400	Dover International Speedway, Dover	June 1	1:00 PM
14	Pocono 400	Pocono Raceway, Long Pond	June 8	1:00 PM
15	Quicken Loans 400	Michigan International Speedway, Brooklyn	June 15	1:00 PM
16	Toyota/Save Mart 350	Sonoma Raceway, Sonoma	June 22	3:00 PM
17	Quaker State 400	Kentucky Speedway, Sparta	June 28	7:30 PM
18	Coke Zero 400	Daytona International Speedway, Daytona Beach	July 6†	11:00 AM
19	Camping World RV Sales 301	New Hampshire Motor Speedway, Loudon	July 13	1:00 PM
20	Crown Royal presents the John Wayne Walding 400	Indianapolis Motor Speedway, Speedway	July 27	1:00 PM
21	Gobowling.com 400	Pocono Raceway, Long Pond	August 3	1:00 PM
22	Cheez-It 355 at The Glen	Watkins Glen International, Watkins Glen	August 10	1:00 PM
23	Pure Michigan 400	Michigan International Speedway, Brooklyn	August 17	1:00 PM
24	Irwin Tools Night Race	Bristol Motor Speedway, Bristol	August 23	7:30 PM
25	Oral-B USA 500	Atlanta Motor Speedway, Hampton	August 31	7:30 PM
26	Federated Auto Parts 400	Richmond International Raceway, Richmond	September 6	7:30 PM
Chase for the Sprint Cup
Round of 16
27	MyAFibStory.com 400	Chicagoland Speedway, Joliet	September 14	2:00 PM
28	Sylvania 300	New Hampshire Motor Speedway, Loudon	September 21	2:00 PM
29	AAA 400	Dover International Speedway, Dover	September 28	2:00 PM
Round of 12
30	Hollywood Casino 400	Kansas Speedway, Kansas City	October 5	2:00 PM
31	Bank of America 500	Charlotte Motor Speedway, Concord	October 11	7:30 PM
32	GEICO 500	Talladega Superspeedway, Talladega	October 19	2:00 PM
Round of 8
33	Goody's Headache Relief Shot 500	Martinsville Speedway, Ridgeway	October 26	1:30 PM
34	AAA Texas 500	Texas Motor Speedway, Fort Worth	November 2	3:00 PM
35	Quicken Loans Race for Heroes 500	Phoenix International Raceway, Avondale	November 9	3:00 PM
Championship 4
36	Ford EcoBoost 400	Homestead-Miami Speedway, Homestead	November 16	3:00 PM
†: The Duck Commander 500 and Coke Zero 400 were postponed a day because of persistent rain.

== Season summary ==
=== Race reports ===
Speedweeks 2014

Speedweeks 2014 kicked off with the 2014 Sprint Unlimited. Denny Hamlin started on pole and won all three segments in a bizarre race that featured 10 of the 18 cars crashing out, along with three more being damaged, and the pace car catching on fire. Hamlin led 27 of the 75 laps and won the race ahead of Brad Keselowski, Kyle Busch, and Joey Logano.

Top ten results (Sprint Unlimited):

1. #11 - Denny Hamlin
2. #2 - Brad Keselowski
3. #18 - Kyle Busch
4. #22 - Joey Logano
5. #4 - Kevin Harvick
6. #1 - Jamie McMurray
7. #9 - Marcos Ambrose
8. #31 - Ryan Newman
9. #88 - Dale Earnhardt Jr.
10. #20 - Matt Kenseth

Qualifying for the front row took place the next day, with rookie Austin Dillon, fielding the famed No. 3 car, appearing for the first time since the 2001 Daytona 500, winning the pole. Martin Truex Jr. won the outside pole.

During the first practice session on Wednesday, a five-car wreck happened and ended with rookie Parker Kligerman on his roof; several teams had to use back-up cars. The wreck brought out a red flag that prematurely ended the session. The second session was run without major incident.

The 2014 Budweiser Duels were fairly uneventful, with Matt Kenseth winning the first race that ran caution-free, and Denny Hamlin winning the second that had only one caution–a large wreck on the last lap that started when Jimmie Johnson ran out of fuel. Jamie McMurray, Martin Truex Jr., and Michael Waltrip, among others, were involved. Clint Bowyer flipped his car during the accident. This was the first night race in The Duels.

Top ten results (Duel 1):

1. #20 - Matt Kenseth
2. #5 - Kasey Kahne
3. #9 - Marcos Ambrose
4. #88 - Dale Earnhardt Jr.
5. #98 - Josh Wise
6. #43 - Aric Almirola
7. #47 - A. J. Allmendinger
8. #38 - David Gilliland
9. #31 - Ryan Newman
10. #14 - Tony Stewart

Top ten results (Duel 2):

1. #11 - Denny Hamlin
2. #24 - Jeff Gordon
3. #41 - Kurt Busch
4. #27 - Paul Menard
5. #33 - Brian Scott
6. #21 - Trevor Bayne
7. #42 - Kyle Larson
8. #78 - Martin Truex Jr.
9. #40 - Landon Cassill
10. #15 - Clint Bowyer

Round 1: Daytona 500

Austin Dillon started on pole, but led only the first lap. The first 35 laps featured Denny Hamlin and Kurt Busch taking turns leading, and Kyle Larson struggling with two flat tires. During the second caution for an engine problem on Martin Truex Jr.'s car, it began to rain, and by lap 39, the red flag was displayed with Kyle Busch as the leader. The red flag lasted over six hours as track-drying was delayed due to ongoing rain showers. The race went back green under the lights, and Dale Earnhardt Jr. dominated the final part of the race. Several minor "big ones" broke out late in the race, but Earnhardt held on to win his second career Daytona 500.

Top ten results:

1. #88 - Dale Earnhardt Jr.
2. #11 - Denny Hamlin
3. #2 - Brad Keselowski
4. #24 - Jeff Gordon
5. #48 - Jimmie Johnson
6. #20 - Matt Kenseth
7. #17 - Ricky Stenhouse Jr.
8. #16 - Greg Biffle
9. #3 - Austin Dillon
10. #13 - Casey Mears

Round 2: The Profit on CNBC 500

Brad Keselowski and Joey Logano took the front row for Team Penske, but Kevin Harvick dominated most of the race. Harvick would hang on to win the race, his first for with his new team, Stewart–Haas Racing. Daytona 500 winner Dale Earnhardt Jr. finished in second.

Top ten results:

1. #4 - Kevin Harvick
2. #88 - Dale Earnhardt Jr.
3. #2 - Brad Keselowski
4. #22 - Joey Logano
5. #24 - Jeff Gordon
6. #48 - Jimmie Johnson
7. #31 - Ryan Newman
8. #99 - Carl Edwards
9. #18 - Kyle Busch
10. #1 - Jamie McMurray

Round 3: Kobalt 400

Joey Logano took the pole, and after a race with several different strategies and leaders, Dale Earnhardt Jr. found himself in the lead trying to make it to the finish on fuel mileage. However, Earnhardt ran out of fuel with just over half a lap to go, and Brad Keselowski took advantage to win the race. Since they had a sizable lead on the rest of the field, Earnhardt would get back going with what little fuel he had left and finish in second position.

Top ten results:

1. #2 - Brad Keselowski
2. #88 - Dale Earnhardt Jr.
3. #27 - Paul Menard
4. #22 - Joey Logano
5. #99 - Carl Edwards
6. #48 - Jimmie Johnson
7. #31 - Ryan Newman
8. #5 - Kasey Kahne
9. #24 - Jeff Gordon
10. #20 - Matt Kenseth

Round 4: Food City 500

The race started on time, but, just like the Daytona 500, rain delayed the race in the early going. The race finally got restarted under the lights several hours later. After many of the frontrunners, including Kyle Busch, Kurt Busch, Matt Kenseth, and Jimmie Johnson, suffered from numerous problems, Carl Edwards found himself up front late in the race. Edwards held on as rain caused the race to end under caution after 503 laps (a caution had waved with two to go and the race had not yet been restarted for the green-white-checker).

Top ten results:

1. #99 - Carl Edwards
2. #17 - Ricky Stenhouse Jr.
3. #43 - Aric Almirola
4. #14 - Tony Stewart
5. #9 - Marcos Ambrose
6. #11 - Denny Hamlin
7. #24 - Jeff Gordon
8. #5 - Kasey Kahne
9. #55 - Brian Vickers
10. #42 - Kyle Larson

Round 5: Auto Club 400

Matt Kenseth started on pole, but gave way to Brad Keselowski, who started on the front row and had the fastest car at the beginning. After he led 38 laps. Jimmie Johnson would take over the lead, leading 104 of the race's 200 laps. Many cautions waved during the race because of drivers repeatedly cutting down left side tires. Kenseth had the first pit box and would take advantage of it a few times, coming out in the lead. Kenseth would lead three or four laps after the restarts, then Johnson would pass him as Kenseth's car faded back. With seven laps remaining, Johnson had a left-front tire go down, giving the lead to his teammate Jeff Gordon. Keselowski suffered his third left-rear tire failure a lap later but stayed out of harm's way. The same fate befell Marcos Ambrose on the same lap. Gordon, who had a large lead, slowed his pace and almost made it to the finish, but Clint Bowyer spun with less than three laps to go, thanks to a flat left-rear tire. The caution waved to set up the green-white-checker finish. On the restart, Gordon got shuffled back to finish in 13th. Kyle Busch passed Tony Stewart and Kurt Busch (both of whom only took two tires during pit stops), bringing rookie Kyle Larson with him. Kyle Busch held off Larson to win his first race of the year. Larson finished second and Kurt Busch finished third. Kenseth also passed Stewart on the last lap to finish in fourth. Stewart came home fifth.

Top ten results:

1. #18 - Kyle Busch
2. #42 - Kyle Larson
3. #41 - Kurt Busch
4. #20 - Matt Kenseth
5. #14 - Tony Stewart
6. #1 - Jamie McMurray
7. #55 - Brian Vickers
8. #47 - A. J. Allmendinger
9. #27 - Paul Menard
10. #99 - Carl Edwards

Round 6: STP 500

Kyle Busch started on pole. Kurt Busch took the lead on lap 490 (the 33rd lead change) and held off Jimmie Johnson to break a winless drought dating back to the 2011 AAA 400, ironically another race that Johnson led the most laps in but was beaten late by Busch. Dale Earnhardt Jr. finished third, Joey Logano fourth, and Marcos Ambrose fifth.

Top ten results:

1. #41 - Kurt Busch
2. #48 - Jimmie Johnson
3. #88 - Dale Earnhardt Jr.
4. #22 - Joey Logano
5. #9 - Marcos Ambrose
6. #20 - Matt Kenseth
7. #4 - Kevin Harvick
8. #43 - Aric Almirola
9. #15 - Clint Bowyer
10. #27 - Paul Menard

Round 7: Duck Commander 500

The race's start was delayed due to rain, marking the third time in seven race weekends in 2014 that weather affected a race. Eventually, NASCAR announced that the race would be postponed to Monday, April 7, and started at 12 p.m., marking the season's first rainout. The race started under green-yellow conditions to allow track workers to dry the track from the rain while green flag laps were counted under yellow flag conditions. Dale Earnhardt Jr. brought out the first yellow of the race two laps after it officially went green on Lap 11 when he clipped the wet infield grass on the front stretch, causing the splitter to dig in and damage the front end of his car before it caught fire. Teammate Jimmie Johnson received some damage from the dirt dug up by Earnhardt Jr. Joey Logano made a last lap pass on Jeff Gordon to win the race.

Top ten results:

1. #22 - Joey Logano
2. #24 - Jeff Gordon
3. #18 - Kyle Busch
4. #55 - Brian Vickers
5. #42 - Kyle Larson
6. #16 - Greg Biffle
7. #20 - Matt Kenseth
8. #15 - Clint Bowyer
9. #27 - Paul Menard
10. #14 - Tony Stewart

Round 8: Bojangles' Southern 500

Kevin Harvick started on the pole, led the most laps, and passed Dale Earnhardt Jr. with two laps to go to win his second race of the year at Darlington Raceway.

Top ten results:

1. #4 - Kevin Harvick
2. #88 - Dale Earnhardt Jr.
3. #48 - Jimmie Johnson
4. #20 - Matt Kenseth
5. #16 - Greg Biffle
6. #18 - Kyle Busch
7. #24 - Jeff Gordon
8. #42 - Kyle Larson
9. #14 - Tony Stewart
10. #31 - Ryan Newman

Round 9: Toyota Owners 400

Joey Logano scored his second win of the season after a nine lap battle for the win.

Top ten results:

1. #22 - Joey Logano
2. #24 - Jeff Gordon
3. #18 - Kyle Busch
4. #2 - Brad Keselowski
5. #20 - Matt Kenseth
6. #47 - A. J. Allmendinger
7. #88 - Dale Earnhardt Jr.
8. #31 - Ryan Newman
9. #99 - Carl Edwards
10. #78 - Martin Truex Jr.

Round 10: Aaron's 499

Denny Hamlin scored his first victory of the season, and first career win at Talladega Superspeedway, after taking the lead from Kevin Harvick with two laps to go.

Top ten results:

1. #11 - Denny Hamlin
2. #16 - Greg Biffle
3. #15 - Clint Bowyer
4. #55 - Brian Vickers
5. #47 - A. J. Allmendinger
6. #27 - Paul Menard
7. #4 - Kevin Harvick
8. #5 - Kasey Kahne
9. #42 - Kyle Larson
10. #17 - Ricky Stenhouse Jr.

Round 11: 5-hour Energy 400

Jeff Gordon took the lead with eight laps to go and held off a last lap charge by Kevin Harvick for his 89th career win.

Top ten results:

1. #24 - Jeff Gordon
2. #4 - Kevin Harvick
3. #5 - Kasey Kahne
4. #22 - Joey Logano
5. #88 - Dale Earnhardt Jr.
6. #99 - Carl Edwards
7. #10 - Danica Patrick
8. #43 - Aric Almirola
9. #48 - Jimmie Johnson
10. #20 - Matt Kenseth

Exhibition: NASCAR Sprint All-Star Race

For the first time, the Sprint Showdown was held the day before the All-Star Race, with Clint Bowyer winning and A. J. Allmendinger finishing second to advance to the All-Star Race. Josh Wise was the winner of the fan vote to be the third driver to advance.

Top ten results (Showdown):

1. #15 - Clint Bowyer
2. #47 - A. J. Allmendinger
3. #13 - Casey Mears
4. #9 - Marcos Ambrose
5. #43 - Aric Almirola
6. #42 - Kyle Larson
7. #17 - Ricky Stenhouse Jr.
8. #3 - Austin Dillon
9. #27 - Paul Menard
10. #10 - Danica Patrick

For the main race, Carl Edwards took the pole in a unique qualifying session, but Kyle Busch won the first 20-lap segment. However, he and Joey Logano crashed in the second segment, followed soon after by Allmendinger. Kasey Kahne won the second and third segments, but faded in the fourth after hitting the wall, along with Ryan Newman. Kevin Harvick would later win the fourth segment. On the restart for the last segment, which was ten laps, Jamie McMurray passed Edwards and held off Harvick to win his first All-Star race.

Top ten results:

1. #1 - Jamie McMurray
2. #4 - Kevin Harvick
3. #20 - Matt Kenseth
4. #88 - Dale Earnhardt Jr.
5. #99 - Carl Edwards
6. #48 - Jimmie Johnson
7. #15 - Clint Bowyer
8. #55 - Brian Vickers
9. #11 - Denny Hamlin
10. #2 - Brad Keselowski

Round 12: Coca-Cola 600

Jimmie Johnson won the pole, led the most laps, and won the race ahead of Kevin Harvick, after the latter was slowed down by pit difficulties late and could not recover in time. Matt Kenseth, Carl Edwards, and Jamie McMurray rounded out the top five. Kurt Busch and Danica Patrick both suffered blown engines in the race, with Busch's engine failure ending his chance of completing all 1,100 miles (1,800 km) of the Indianapolis 500 and Coca-Cola 600, an act known as "Double Duty".

Top ten results:

1. #48 - Jimmie Johnson
2. #4 - Kevin Harvick
3. #20 - Matt Kenseth
4. #99 - Carl Edwards
5. #1 - Jamie McMurray
6. #55 - Brian Vickers
7. #24 - Jeff Gordon
8. #27 - Paul Menard
9. #18 - Kyle Busch
10. #2 - Brad Keselowski

Round 13: FedEx 400

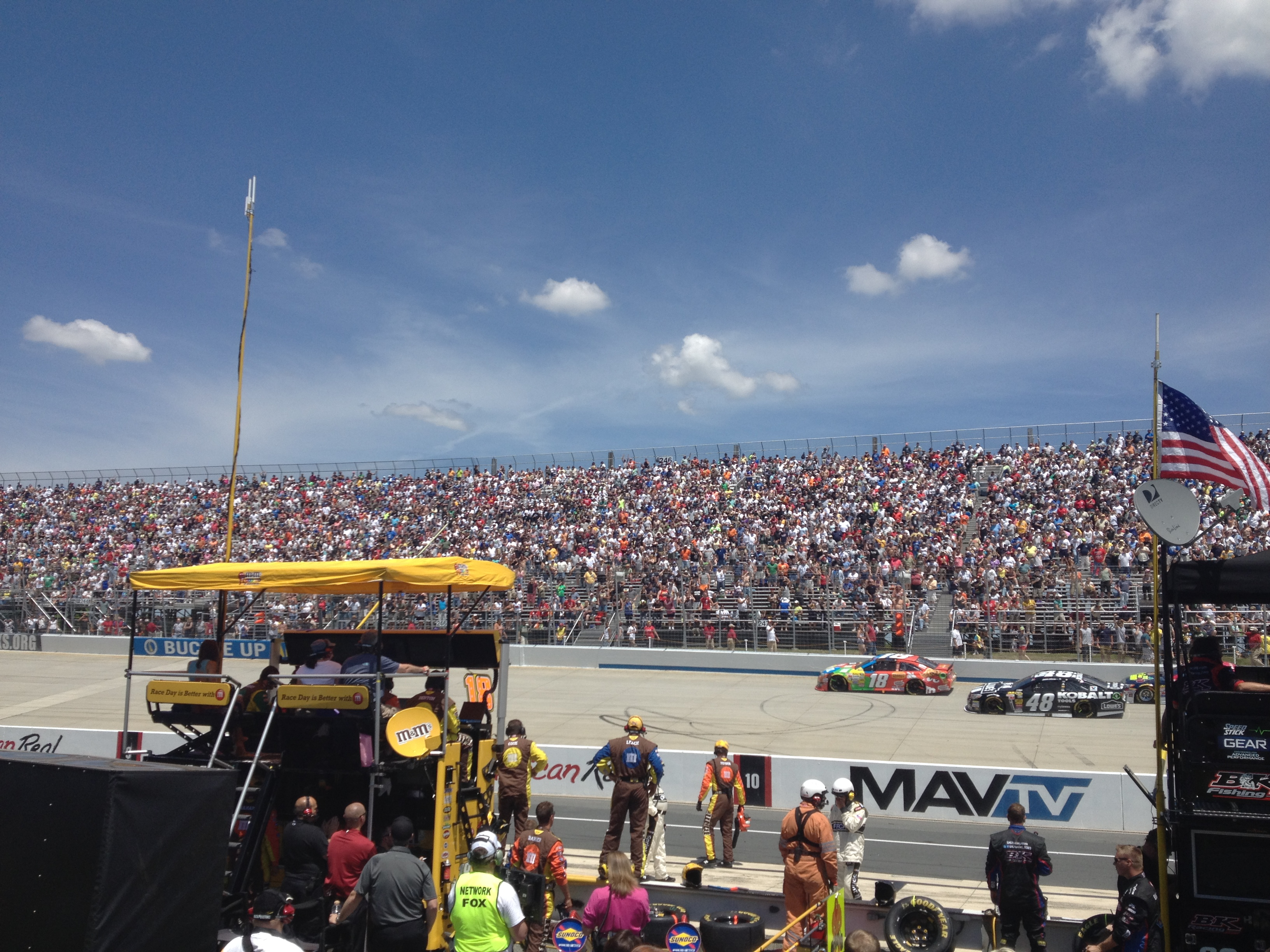
Kyle Busch leads the FedEx 400 following the restart from the first caution

Brad Keselowski started on pole, but Kyle Busch led the early part of the race. Jimmie Johnson eventually passed Kyle Busch for the lead. Clint Bowyer got into Kyle Busch, who wound up hitting the wall and ending his day. Greg Biffle and Ricky Stenhouse Jr. collided on the backstretch, also involving Landon Cassill, Ryan Truex, and Justin Allgaier. The race was red flagged in order to clean up. After the race resumed, Kevin Harvick took the lead from Johnson. Jamie McMurray hit a piece of concrete in turn two, which resulted in a second red flag in order to repair the hole in the track. The concrete ended up causing damage to the bridge over the track in that location. Harvick continued to lead after the red flag until having to pit for a flat tire, yielding the lead to Matt Kenseth. Johnson took the lead from Kenseth and dominated the remainder of the race, winning his second consecutive race and his ninth win at Dover. Despite the damage from the earlier incident, Greg Biffle reentered the race and finished 38th, his 85th consecutive race without a DNF, breaking the NASCAR record previously held by Herman Beam.

Top ten results:

1. #48 - Jimmie Johnson
2. #2 - Brad Keselowski
3. #20 - Matt Kenseth
4. #15 - Clint Bowyer
5. #11 - Denny Hamlin
6. #78 - Martin Truex Jr.
7. #14 - Tony Stewart
8. #22 - Joey Logano
9. #88 - Dale Earnhardt Jr.
10. #27 - Paul Menard

Round 14: Pocono 400

Denny Hamlin took the pole with a new track record, but Brad Keselowski led the most laps. Jimmie Johnson started 20th and worked up to 5th; however, his progress was stunted by a pit-road collision with Marcos Ambrose. Other contenders Tony Stewart and Kevin Harvick were done in by a pit road speeding penalty and a flat tire, respectively. Kasey Kahne was then taken out after being forced up into the wall by Kyle Busch, causing a crash that also involved Carl Edwards. After the final restart, Keselowski picked up a large piece of debris on his grill and got passed by Dale Earnhardt Jr. while trying to pull up behind the slower Danica Patrick to remove the debris. Earnhardt would continue to lead and pick up his first career victory at Pocono. The win was the fourth in a row for Hendrick Motorsports in 2014, and the fourth in a row for Hendrick at Pocono with four different drivers.

Top ten results:

1. #88 - Dale Earnhardt Jr.
2. #2 - Brad Keselowski
3. #41 - Kurt Busch
4. #11 - Denny Hamlin
5. #42 - Kyle Larson
6. #48 - Jimmie Johnson
7. #31 - Ryan Newman
8. #24 - Jeff Gordon
9. #78 - Martin Truex Jr.
10. #1 - Jamie McMurray

Round 15: Quicken Loans 400

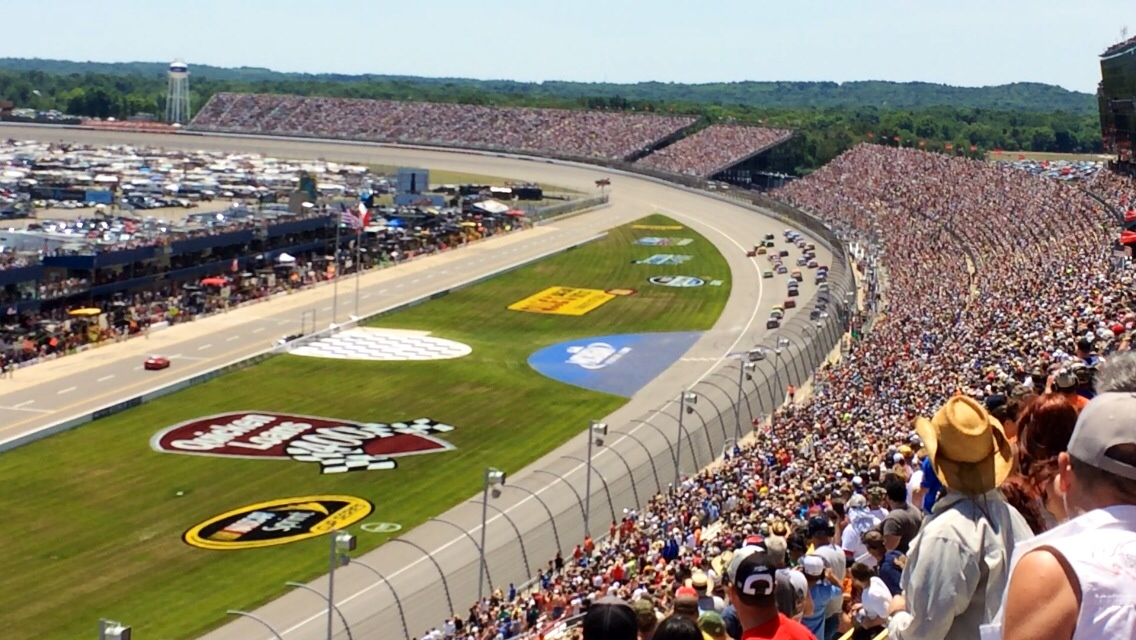
Racing action after a restart at the 2014 Quicken Loans 400 at Michigan International Speedway.

Jimmie Johnson took the lead with ten laps remaining to take his first win at Michigan International Speedway. This was his first career win at Michigan, after numerous unsuccessful attempts that ended with crashes, engine failures, or running out of fuel.

Top ten results:

1. #48 - Jimmie Johnson
2. #4 - Kevin Harvick
3. #2 - Brad Keselowski
4. #27 - Paul Menard
5. #5 - Kasey Kahne
6. #24 - Jeff Gordon
7. #88 - Dale Earnhardt Jr.
8. #42 - Kyle Larson
9. #22 - Joey Logano
10. #15 - Clint Bowyer

Round 16: Toyota/Save Mart 350

Carl Edwards held off a last lap charge from Jeff Gordon to win the Toyota/Save Mart 350 at Sonoma Raceway.

Top ten results:

1. #99 - Carl Edwards
2. #24 - Jeff Gordon
3. #88 - Dale Earnhardt Jr.
4. #1 - Jamie McMurray
5. #27 - Paul Menard
6. #5 - Kasey Kahne
7. #48 - Jimmie Johnson
8. #9 - Marcos Ambrose
9. #16 - Greg Biffle
10. #15 - Clint Bowyer

Round 17: Quaker State 400

In a dominant performance from Team Penske, Joey Logano and Brad Keselowski combined to lead 236 of the 267 laps and Keselowski led 199 laps to win the Quaker State 400 at Kentucky Speedway. He described his car as "awesome" and that his crew did a "great job."

Top ten results:

1. #2 - Brad Keselowski
2. #18 - Kyle Busch
3. #31 - Ryan Newman
4. #20 - Matt Kenseth
5. #88 - Dale Earnhardt Jr.
6. #24 - Jeff Gordon
7. #4 - Kevin Harvick
8. #5 - Kasey Kahne
9. #22 - Joey Logano
10. #48 - Jimmie Johnson

Round 18: Coke Zero 400

Aric Almirola scored his first career victory in the rain-shortened Coke Zero 400 at Daytona International Speedway. He said he could not "dream" of a better place to get his first win. Kurt Busch was penalized 10 points for a technical infraction following post-race inspection.

Top ten results:

1. #43 - Aric Almirola
2. #55 - Brian Vickers
3. #41 - Kurt Busch
4. #13 - Casey Mears
5. #3 - Austin Dillon
6. #11 - Denny Hamlin
7. #95 - Michael McDowell
8. #10 - Danica Patrick
9. #15 - Clint Bowyer
10. #9 - Marcos Ambrose

Round 19: Camping World RV Sales 301

Brad Keselowski staved off a green-white-checker charge by Kyle Busch to win.

Top ten results:

1. #2 - Brad Keselowski
2. #18 - Kyle Busch
3. #42 - Kyle Larson
4. #20 - Matt Kenseth
5. #31 - Ryan Newman
6. #15 - Clint Bowyer
7. #14 - Tony Stewart
8. #11 - Denny Hamlin
9. #17 - Ricky Stenhouse Jr.
10. #88 - Dale Earnhardt Jr.

Round 20: Brickyard 400

Jeff Gordon scored his record 5th win in the Brickyard 400 after passing Kasey Kahne on a restart with 17 laps to go. The race was dominated by a variety of pit strategies. Kasey Kahne led the most laps in the race with 70 as Hendrick powered cars led 127 of the 160 laps.

Top ten results:

1. #24 - Jeff Gordon
2. #18 - Kyle Busch
3. #11 - Denny Hamlin
4. #20 - Matt Kenseth
5. #22 - Joey Logano
6. #5 - Kasey Kahne
7. #42 - Kyle Larson
8. #4 - Kevin Harvick
9. #88 - Dale Earnhardt Jr.
10. #3 - Austin Dillon

Round 21: Gobowling.com 400

Despite having Kevin Harvick filling his rearview mirror, Dale Earnhardt Jr. was able to maintain the lead to complete the first Pocono sweep since Denny Hamlin did it in 2006.

Top ten results:

1. #88 - Dale Earnhardt Jr.
2. #4 - Kevin Harvick
3. #22 - Joey Logano
4. #15 - Clint Bowyer
5. #16 - Greg Biffle
6. #24 - Jeff Gordon
7. #1 - Jamie McMurray
8. #31 - Ryan Newman
9. #11 - Denny Hamlin
10. #5 - Kasey Kahne

Round 22: Cheez-It 355 at The Glen

A. J. Allmendinger held off a hard charging Marcos Ambrose with two laps remaining to score his first career Sprint Cup Series victory, and the first Cup Series victory for JTG Daugherty Racing.

Top ten results:

1. #47 - A. J. Allmendinger
2. #9 - Marcos Ambrose
3. #41 - Kurt Busch
4. #42 - Kyle Larson
5. #99 - Carl Edwards
6. #22 - Joey Logano
7. #4 - Kevin Harvick
8. #16 - Greg Biffle
9. #20 - Matt Kenseth
10. #55 - Brian Vickers

Round 23: Pure Michigan 400

Jeff Gordon took the lead from Joey Logano on the final restart and sailed to victory lane for the 91st time in his career.

Top ten results:

1. #24 - Jeff Gordon
2. #4 - Kevin Harvick
3. #22 - Joey Logano
4. #27 - Paul Menard
5. #88 - Dale Earnhardt Jr.
6. #15 - Clint Bowyer
7. #11 - Denny Hamlin
8. #2 - Brad Keselowski
9. #48 - Jimmie Johnson
10. #16 - Greg Biffle

Round 24: Irwin Tools Night Race

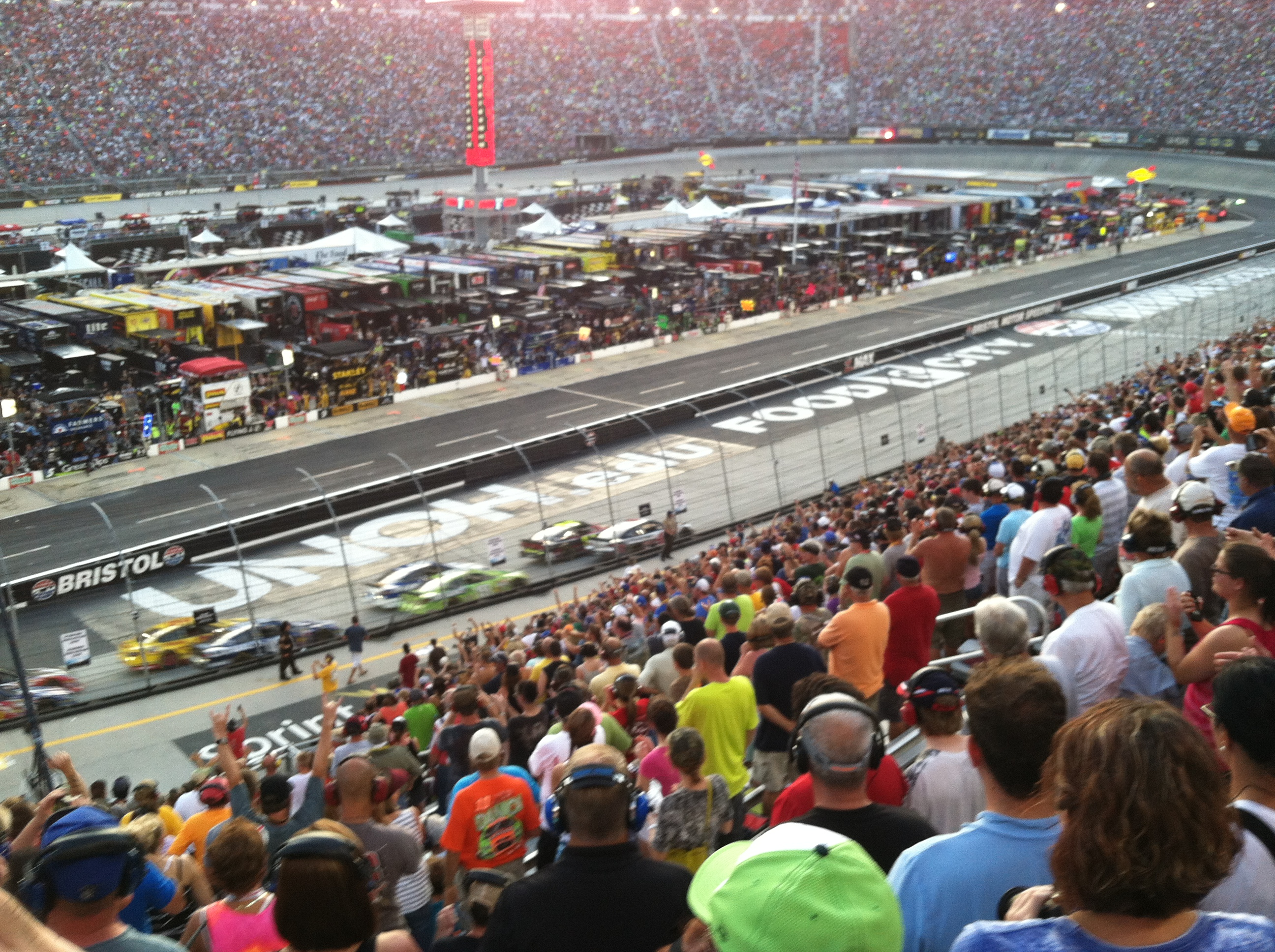
The start of the Irwin Tools Night Race.

Joey Logano took the lead with 45 laps to go and had to hold off a late race charge by Brad Keselowski to score his third win of the 2014 season.

Top ten results:

1. #22 - Joey Logano
2. #2 - Brad Keselowski
3. #20 - Matt Kenseth
4. #48 - Jimmie Johnson
5. #41 - Kurt Busch
6. #17 - Ricky Stenhouse Jr.
7. #99 - Carl Edwards
8. #1 - Jamie McMurray
9. #27 - Paul Menard
10. #16 - Greg Biffle

Round 25: Oral-B USA 500

Kasey Kahne took the lead on the second Green-White-Checker attempt and held off Matt Kenseth to score his first win of the season.

Top ten results:

1. #5 - Kasey Kahne
2. #20 - Matt Kenseth
3. #11 - Denny Hamlin
4. #48 - Jimmie Johnson
5. #99 - Carl Edwards
6. #10 - Danica Patrick
7. #31 - Ryan Newman
8. #42 - Kyle Larson
9. #43 - Aric Almirola
10. #16 - Greg Biffle

Round 26: Federated Auto Parts 400

Brad Keselowski would dominate, leading 383 laps on his way to his fourth win of the season.

Top ten results:

1. #2 - Brad Keselowski
2. #24 - Jeff Gordon
3. #15 - Clint Bowyer
4. #1 - Jamie McMurray
5. #4 - Kevin Harvick
6. #22 - Joey Logano
7. #41 - Kurt Busch
8. #48 - Jimmie Johnson
9. #31 - Ryan Newman
10. #43 - Aric Almirola

Round 27: MyAFibStory.com 400

The Chase-Opening race at Chicagoland Speedway started with qualifying being rained-out and Kyle Busch starting on Pole for being the fastest in first practice, and Chase Seed #1 Brad Keselowski wound up starting 25th for the 267 lap event. Busch led 46 laps early on, but the race saw comers and goers as it saw only a few cautions for the first 3/4 of the event. Jeff Gordon, Jamie McMurray, Keselowski, and Kevin Harvick (who led a race-high 79 laps) took turns at the front over the course of 100 laps of green. Keselowski and Harvick both suffered loose wheels and had to start at the tail-end of the lead lap. Chase driver Aric Almirola was leading on series of green flag pit stops with 37 to go when his engine blew and was forced to retire. Rookie Kyle Larson wound up taking the lead in the late going with a superior machine, battling Harvick, Gordon, and Keselowski in the late going with Keselowski making a three-wide move in between Larson and Harvick, taking the lead for good. With 10 laps to go, the final caution came out after Ricky Stenhouse Jr. and Danica Patrick got together in Turn 4. On the final restart, Keselowski got away easy, Harvick fell to 5th, and Keselowski the #1 seed scored his 5th win of the season and second at Chicagoland. Gordon beat Larson for 2nd, and Joey Logano blew up out of Turn 4, but streaked across the finish line up in smoke to finish 4th.

Top ten results:

1. #2 - Brad Keselowski
2. #24 - Jeff Gordon
3. #42 - Kyle Larson
4. #22 - Joey Logano
5. #4 - Kevin Harvick
6. #11 - Denny Hamlin
7. #18 - Kyle Busch
8. #41 - Kurt Busch
9. #1 - Jamie McMurray
10. #20 - Matt Kenseth

Round 28: Sylvania 300

Joey Logano took off on the first Green-White-Checker attempt to score his fourth victory of the season.

Top ten results:

1. #22 - Joey Logano
2. #42 - Kyle Larson
3. #4 - Kevin Harvick
4. #1 - Jamie McMurray
5. #48 - Jimmie Johnson
6. #43 - Aric Almirola
7. #2 - Brad Keselowski
8. #18 - Kyle Busch
9. #88 - Dale Earnhardt Jr.
10. #55 - Brian Vickers

Round 29: AAA 400

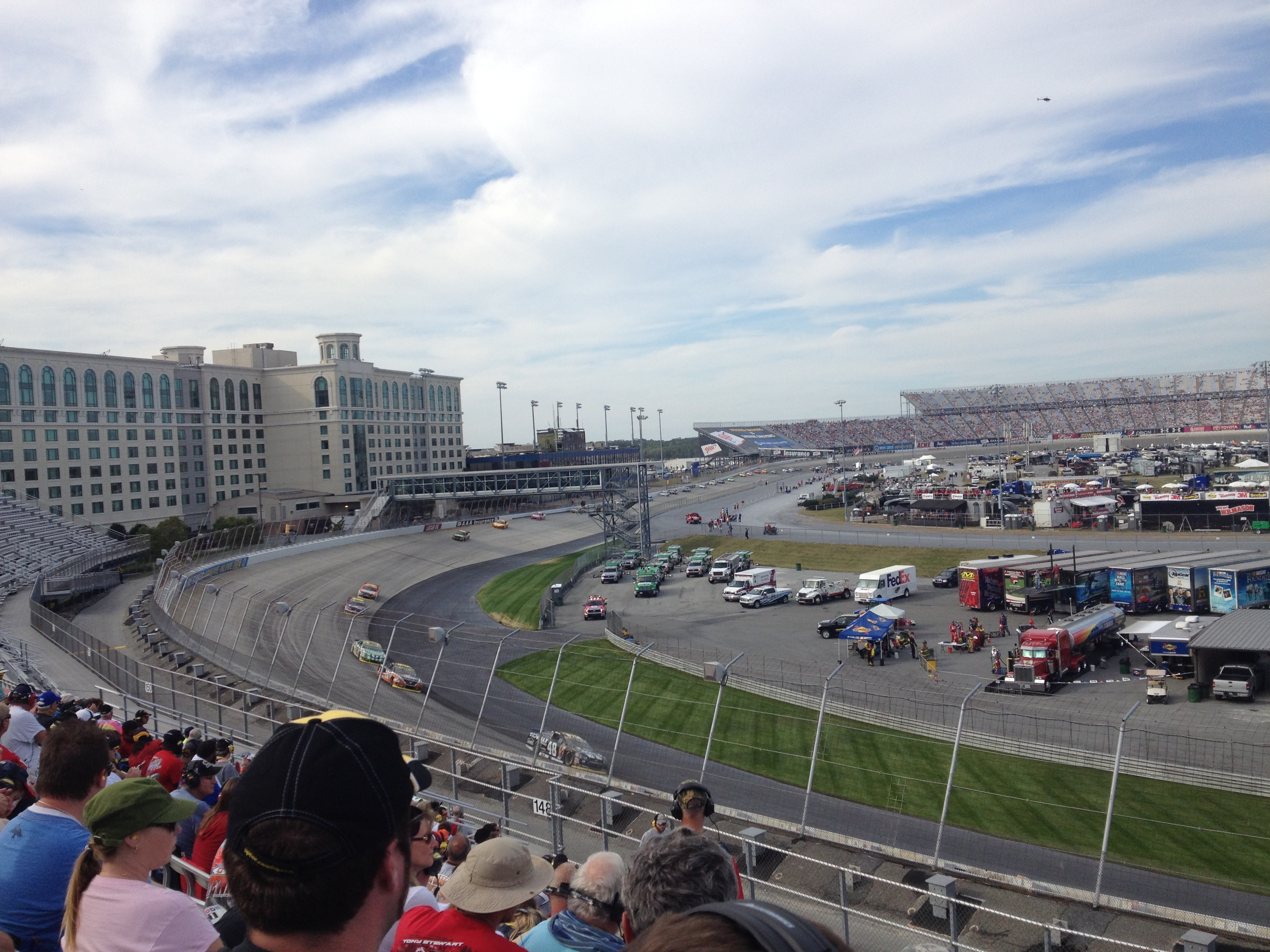
The AAA 400 from turn 3

Kevin Harvick started on pole and dominated most of the first half of the race. Cautions flew for debris on lap 62, Ricky Stenhouse Jr. brushing the wall on lap 75, and debris again on lap 125. Brad Keselowski took the lead from Harvick on lap 148. After a caution for J. J. Yeley scraping the wall on lap 171, Harvick regained the lead. After a round of green flag pit stops, Harvick cut a tire and brought out the caution on lap 254. Keselowski took over the race lead. Jeff Gordon took the lead from Keselowski on lap 305 and continued on for the win, the 92nd of his career. Following this race, A. J. Allmendinger, Kurt Busch, Greg Biffle, and Aric Almirola were eliminated from the Chase.

Top ten results:

1. #24 - Jeff Gordon
2. #2 - Brad Keselowski
3. #48 - Jimmie Johnson
4. #22 - Joey Logano
5. #20 - Matt Kenseth
6. #42 - Kyle Larson
7. #78 - Martin Truex Jr.
8. #31 - Ryan Newman
9. #15 - Clint Bowyer
10. #18 - Kyle Busch

Round 30: Hollywood Casino 400

On the final restart with 28 laps to go, Ryan Newman lost the lead to Joey Logano and he held off a hard-charging Kyle Larson to score his fifth win of the season.

Top ten results:

1. #22 - Joey Logano
2. #42 - Kyle Larson
3. #18 - Kyle Busch
4. #78 - Martin Truex Jr.
5. #99 - Carl Edwards
6. #31 - Ryan Newman
7. #11 - Denny Hamlin
8. #3 - Austin Dillon
9. #27 - Paul Menard
10. #55 - Brian Vickers

Round 31: Bank of America 500

Kevin Harvick shot ahead of Jeff Gordon on the final restart with two laps remaining to win the Bank of America 500 at Charlotte Motor Speedway.

Top ten results:

1. #4 - Kevin Harvick
2. #24 - Jeff Gordon
3. #1 - Jamie McMurray
4. #22 - Joey Logano
5. #18 - Kyle Busch
6. #42 - Kyle Larson
7. #31 - Ryan Newman
8. #99 - Carl Edwards
9. #11 - Denny Hamlin
10. #5 - Kasey Kahne

Round 32: GEICO 500

Brad Keselowski held off hard-charging Ryan Newman and Matt Kenseth to win the GEICO 500. Kyle Busch, Dale Earnhardt Jr., Kasey Kahne and Jimmie Johnson were the four drivers who were eliminated.

Top ten results:

1. #2 - Brad Keselowski
2. #20 - Matt Kenseth
3. #15 - Clint Bowyer
4. #40 - Landon Cassill
5. #31 - Ryan Newman
6. #33 - Travis Kvapil
7. #41 - Kurt Busch
8. #9 - Marcos Ambrose
9. #4 - Kevin Harvick
10. #13 - Casey Mears

Round 33: Goody's Headache Relief Shot 500

Dale Earnhardt Jr. took the lead from Tony Stewart with four laps to go and held off a hard charging Jeff Gordon to score his first career win at Martinsville Speedway.

Top ten results:

1. #88 - Dale Earnhardt Jr.
2. #24 - Jeff Gordon
3. #31 - Ryan Newman
4. #14 - Tony Stewart
5. #22 - Joey Logano
6. #20 - Matt Kenseth
7. #15 - Clint Bowyer
8. #11 - Denny Hamlin
9. #47 - A. J. Allmendinger
10. #34 - David Ragan

Round 34: AAA Texas 500

Jimmie Johnson held off Brad Keselowski and Kevin Harvick to score his 70th career win.

This race is also known for a late-race incident between Harvick, Brad Keselowski, and Jeff Gordon, which resulted in a post-race brawl on pit road. Robin Pemberton, NASCAR's senior vice president of competition, said that series officials will review what took place to determine what, if any, penalties will be issued.

Top ten results:

1. #48 - Jimmie Johnson
2. #4 - Kevin Harvick
3. #2 - Brad Keselowski
4. #18 - Kyle Busch
5. #1 - Jamie McMurray
6. #88 - Dale Earnhardt Jr.
7. #42 - Kyle Larson
8. #41 - Kurt Busch
9. #99 - Carl Edwards
10. #11 - Denny Hamlin

Round 35: Quicken Loans Race for Heroes 500

Kevin Harvick dominated the race to score the victory. In the final turn, Ryan Newman sent Kyle Larson into the wall to secure his place in the championship race. Kevin Harvick (with the much-needed win), Joey Logano, Denny Hamlin, and Ryan Newman were the four drivers who will race for the championship, which also meant that NASCAR will be having a new Sprint Cup Series champion. Jeff Gordon, Carl Edwards, Brad Keselowski, and Matt Kenseth were the four drivers eliminated.

Top ten results:

1. #4 - Kevin Harvick
2. #24 - Jeff Gordon
3. #20 - Matt Kenseth
4. #2 - Brad Keselowski
5. #11 - Denny Hamlin
6. #22 - Joey Logano
7. #41 - Kurt Busch
8. #88 - Dale Earnhardt Jr.
9. #16 - Greg Biffle
10. #9 - Marcos Ambrose
- This was Jeff Gordon's final Second place finish.

Round 36: Ford EcoBoost 400

Jeff Gordon won the pole for the race and dominated. Kevin Harvick took the lead from Denny Hamlin with 8 laps to go, but a late caution forced the race to have a 3 lap shootout. Harvick and Ryan Newman, who were the top of the 4 championship contenders, restarted on the front row. Harvick held off Newman to score his fifth win of the season and take the 2014 NASCAR Sprint Cup title.

Top ten results:

1. #4 - Kevin Harvick
2. #31 - Ryan Newman
3. #2 - Brad Keselowski
4. #27 - Paul Menard
5. #1 - Jamie McMurray
6. #20 - Matt Kenseth
7. #11 - Denny Hamlin
8. #15 - Clint Bowyer
9. #48 - Jimmie Johnson
10. #24 - Jeff Gordon

== Results and standings ==
=== Races ===
No.	Race	Pole position	Most laps led	Winning driver	Manufacturer	Report
	Sprint Unlimited at Daytona	Denny Hamlin	Denny Hamlin	Denny Hamlin	Toyota	Report
	Budweiser Duel 1	Austin Dillon	Matt Kenseth	Matt Kenseth	Toyota	Report
	Budweiser Duel 2	Martin Truex Jr.	Brad Keselowski	Denny Hamlin	Toyota	Report
1	Daytona 500	Austin Dillon	Dale Earnhardt Jr.	Dale Earnhardt Jr.	Chevrolet	Report
2	The Profit on CNBC 500	Brad Keselowski	Kevin Harvick	Kevin Harvick	Chevrolet	Report
3	Kobalt 400	Joey Logano	Brad Keselowski	Brad Keselowski	Ford	Report
4	Food City 500	Denny Hamlin	Matt Kenseth	Carl Edwards	Ford	Report
5	Auto Club 400	Matt Kenseth	Jimmie Johnson	Kyle Busch	Toyota	Report
6	STP 500	Kyle Busch	Jimmie Johnson	Kurt Busch	Chevrolet	Report
7	Duck Commander 500	Tony Stewart	Joey Logano	Joey Logano	Ford	Report
8	Bojangles' Southern 500	Kevin Harvick	Kevin Harvick	Kevin Harvick	Chevrolet	Report
9	Toyota Owners 400	Kyle Larson	Jeff Gordon	Joey Logano	Ford	Report
10	Aaron's 499	Brian Scott	Greg Biffle	Denny Hamlin	Toyota	Report
11	5-hour Energy 400	Kevin Harvick	Kevin Harvick	Jeff Gordon	Chevrolet	Report
	NASCAR Sprint All-Star Race	Carl Edwards	Jamie McMurray	Jamie McMurray	Chevrolet	Report
12	Coca-Cola 600	Jimmie Johnson	Jimmie Johnson	Jimmie Johnson	Chevrolet	Report
13	FedEx 400	Brad Keselowski	Jimmie Johnson	Jimmie Johnson	Chevrolet	Report
14	Pocono 400	Denny Hamlin	Brad Keselowski	Dale Earnhardt Jr.	Chevrolet	Report
15	Quicken Loans 400	Kevin Harvick	Kevin Harvick	Jimmie Johnson	Chevrolet	Report
16	Toyota/Save Mart 350	Jamie McMurray	A. J. Allmendinger	Carl Edwards	Ford	Report
17	Quaker State 400	Brad Keselowski	Brad Keselowski	Brad Keselowski	Ford	Report
18	Coke Zero 400	David Gilliland	Kurt Busch	Aric Almirola	Ford	Report
19	Camping World RV Sales 301	Kyle Busch	Brad Keselowski	Brad Keselowski	Ford	Report
20	Brickyard 400	Kevin Harvick	Kasey Kahne	Jeff Gordon	Chevrolet	Report
21	Gobowling.com 400	Kyle Larson	Jeff Gordon	Dale Earnhardt Jr.	Chevrolet	Report
22	Cheez-It 355 at The Glen	Jeff Gordon	A. J. Allmendinger; Jeff Gordon	A. J. Allmendinger	Chevrolet	Report
23	Pure Michigan 400	Jeff Gordon	Joey Logano	Jeff Gordon	Chevrolet	Report
24	Irwin Tools Night Race	Kevin Harvick	Jamie McMurray	Joey Logano	Ford	Report
25	Oral-B USA 500	Kevin Harvick	Kevin Harvick	Kasey Kahne	Chevrolet	Report
26	Federated Auto Parts 400	Brad Keselowski	Brad Keselowski	Brad Keselowski	Ford	Report
Chase for the Sprint Cup
Challenger Round
27	MyAFibStory.com 400	Kyle Busch	Kevin Harvick	Brad Keselowski	Ford	Report
28	Sylvania 300	Brad Keselowski	Kevin Harvick	Joey Logano	Ford	Report
29	AAA 400	Kevin Harvick	Kevin Harvick	Jeff Gordon	Chevrolet	Report
Contender Round
30	Hollywood Casino 400	Kevin Harvick	Joey Logano	Joey Logano	Ford	Report
31	Bank of America 500	Kyle Busch	Kevin Harvick	Kevin Harvick	Chevrolet	Report
32	GEICO 500	Brian Vickers	Jimmie Johnson	Brad Keselowski	Ford	Report
Eliminator Round
33	Goody's Headache Relief Shot 500	Jamie McMurray	Jeff Gordon	Dale Earnhardt Jr.	Chevrolet	Report
34	AAA Texas 500	Matt Kenseth	Jimmie Johnson	Jimmie Johnson	Chevrolet	Report
35	Quicken Loans Race for Heroes 500	Denny Hamlin	Kevin Harvick	Kevin Harvick	Chevrolet	Report
Championship
36	Ford EcoBoost 400	Jeff Gordon	Jeff Gordon	Kevin Harvick	Chevrolet	Report

=== Drivers' championship ===
(key) Bold – Pole position awarded by time. Italics – Pole position set by final practice results or owner's points. * – Most laps led.
. – Eliminated after Challenger Round . – Eliminated after Contender Round . – Eliminated after Eliminator Round

Pos.	Driver	DAY	PHO	LVS	BRI	CAL	MAR	TEX	DAR	RCH	TAL	KAN	CLT	DOV	POC	MCH	SON	KEN	DAY	NHA	IND	POC	GLN	MCH	BRI	ATL	RCH	CHI	NHA	DOV	KAN	CLT	TAL	MAR	TEX	PHO	HOM	Pts.
1	Kevin Harvick	13	1*	41	39	36	7	42	**1***	11	7	**2***	2	17	14	**2***	20	7	39	30	**8**	2	7	2	**11**	**19***	5	5*	3*	**13***	**12**	1*	9	33	2	1*	1	5043
2	Ryan Newman	22	7	7	16	20	20	16	10	8	18	11	15	31	7	15	11	3	24	5	11	8	41	11	13	7	9	15	18	8	6	7	5	3	15	11	2	5042
3	Denny Hamlin	2	19	12	**6**	INQ	19	13	19	22	1	18	22	5	**4**	29	26	42	6	8	3	9	24	7	40	3	21	6	37	12	7	9	18	8	10	**5**	7	5037
4	Joey Logano	11	4	**4**	20	39	4	1*	35	1	32	4	12	8	40	9	16	9	17	40	5	3	6	3*	1	14	6	4	1	4	1*	4	11	5	12	6	16	5028
Chase for the Sprint Cup cut-off
Pos.	Driver	DAY	PHO	LVS	BRI	CAL	MAR	TEX	DAR	RCH	TAL	KAN	CLT	DOV	POC	MCH	SON	KEN	DAY	NHA	IND	POC	GLN	MCH	BRI	ATL	RCH	CHI	NHA	DOV	KAN	CLT	TAL	MAR	TEX	PHO	HOM	Pts.
5	Brad Keselowski	3	**3**	1*	14	26	38	15	17	4	38	13	10	**2**	2*	3	22	**1***	18	1*	12	23	35	8	2	39	**1***	1	**7**	2	36	16	1	31	3	4	3	2361
6	Jeff Gordon	4	5	9	7	13	12	2	7	2*	39	1	7	15	8	6	2	6	12	26	1	6*	**34***	**1**	16	17	2	2	26	1	14	2	26	2*	29	2	**10***	2348
7	Matt Kenseth	6	12	10	13*	**4**	6	7	4	5	37	10	3	3	25	14	42	4	20	4	4	38	9	38	3	2	41	10	21	5	13	19	2	6	**25**	3	6	2334
8	Dale Earnhardt Jr.	1*	2	2	24	12	3	43	2	7	26	5	19	9	1	7	3	5	14	10	9	1	11	5	39	11	12	11	9	17	39	20	31	1	6	8	14	2301
9	Carl Edwards	17	8	5	1	10	13	14	13	9	30	6	4	14	41	23	1	17	37	13	15	29	5	23	7	5	22	20	17	11	5	8	21	20	9	15	34	2288
10	Kyle Busch	19	9	11	29	1	**14**	3	6	3	12	15	9	42	12	41	25	2	28	**2**	2	42	40	39	36	16	14	7	8	10	3	**5**	40	11	4	34	39	2285
11	Jimmie Johnson	5	6	6	19	24*	2*	25	3	32	23	9	**1***	1*	6	1	7	10	42	42	14	39	28	9	4	4	8	12	5	3	40	17	24*	32	1*	39	9	2274
12	Kurt Busch	21	39	26	35	3	1	39	31	23	33	29	40	18	3	13	12	12	3*	17	28	13	3	31	5	13	7	8	36	18	42	11	7	36	8	7	11	2263
13	A. J. Allmendinger	26	26	18	25	8	11	23	15	6	5	30	23	21	21	22	37*	22	43	18	18	34	1*	13	14	40	23	22	13	23	11	12	23	9	14	16	40	2260
14	Greg Biffle	8	17	22	12	40	18	6	5	15	2*	16	21	38	16	20	9	14	29	15	13	5	8	10	10	10	19	23	16	21	15	18	25	13	13	9	41	2247
15	Kasey Kahne	31	11	8	8	41	22	11	37	14	8	3	14	19	42	5	6	8	27	11	6*	10	12	16	35	1	17	13	23	20	22	10	12	40	38	21	12	2234
16	Aric Almirola	39	15	25	3	43	8	12	24	17	13	8	11	12	22	31	23	39	1	23	21	35	18	20	41	9	10	41	6	28	31	22	39	21	24	18	19	2195
17	Kyle Larson **(R)**	38	20	19	10	2	27	5	8	16	9	12	18	11	5	8	28	40	36	3	7	**11**	4	43	12	8	11	3	2	6	2	6	17	30	7	13	13	1080
18	Jamie McMurray	14	10	15	38	6	42	17	16	13	29	39	5	13	10	12	**4**	37	30	16	20	7	14	14	8*	12	4	9	4	22	25	3	35	**16**	5	14	5	1014
19	Clint Bowyer	42	13	23	15	16	9	8	12	43	3	23	17	4	11	10	10	23	9	6	16	4	27	6	17	38	3	39	14	9	18	43	3	7	28	40	8	979
20	Austin Dillon **(R)**	**9**	24	16	11	11	15	21	11	27	15	19	16	20	17	30	17	16	5	14	10	15	16	22	28	24	20	16	11	24	8	13	13	12	21	38	25	958
21	Paul Menard	32	23	3	21	9	10	9	41	24	6	17	8	10	26	4	5	15	16	19	34	33	32	4	9	18	18	21	15	16	9	42	36	14	17	23	4	944
22	Brian Vickers	30	25	13	9	7	16	4	26	12	4	14	6	43	19	42	14	26	2	21	19	37	10	19	21	15	13	24	10	15	10	37	**20**	27	16	19	23	921
23	Marcos Ambrose	18	21	24	5	30	5	20	14	18	19	24	29	16	24	25	8	13	10	27	22	14	2	12	34	42	27	25	24	26	20	25	8	23	27	10	27	870
24	Martin Truex Jr.	43	22	14	36	23	21	18	27	10	17	21	25	6	9	37	15	19	15	12	25	32	13	36	20	23	25	14	12	7	4	14	27	38	19	12	17	857
25	Tony Stewart	35	16	33	4	5	17	**10**	9	25	43	20	13	7	13	11	19	11	40	7	17	36	QL			41	15	18	30	14	17	21	34	4	11	20	43	799
26	Casey Mears	10	14	28	27	15	24	28	18	19	14	26	24	25	23	24	13	20	4	38	33	12	15	17	26	22	31	26	22	27	28	31	10	37	18	35	20	782
27	Ricky Stenhouse Jr.	7	18	27	2	34	40	26	20	38	10	22	26	41	15	27	31	25	41	9	24	18	20	15	6	20	26	17	39	19	19	24	DNQ	15	23	17	22	757
28	Danica Patrick	40	36	21	18	14	32	27	22	34	22	7	39	23	37	17	18	21	8	22	42	30	21	18	27	6	16	19	19	25	16	26	19	34	36	22	18	735
29	Justin Allgaier **(R)**	27	30	31	17	28	23	24	23	21	27	36	37	26	27	16	33	24	25	37	27	16	17	42	19	26	28	27	20	29	41	15	DNQ	17	20	37	15	636
30	David Gilliland	36	29	30	22	38	26	22	28	20	40	37	43	29	28	26	21	30	**35**	24	36	17	22	21	25	28	29	34	27	33	30	32	29	22	34	24	31	554
31	Cole Whitt **(R)**	28	27	36	40	18	29	31	38	41	21	28	27	27	30	28	27	28	34	28	32	21	43	25	30	30	30	30	38	30	23	28	15	18	26	42	26	532
32	David Ragan	34	28	32	31	27	28	35	32	30	35	38	31	36	18	38	36	31	22	25	35	19	19	24	23	27	33	31	42	31	27	34	30	10	32	25	30	531
33	Michael Annett **(R)**	37	34	29	26	19	31	29	42	33	16	25	28	35	20	21	30	18	21	32	31	22	31	40	38	21	37	40	29	41	24	33	37	24	22	26	35	531
34	Reed Sorenson	16	31	34	28	21	34	33	39	42	34	32	42	24	34	32	32	27	33	33	38	27	23	27	24	29	24	29	31	32	26	27	14	35	33	28	24	516
35	Alex Bowman **(R)**	23	41	37	32	22	36	32	29	28	28	35	33	40	31	40	29	36	13	31	40	31	36	26	32	35	38	35	28	34	32	30	43	29	42	32	33	412
36	Josh Wise	24	DNQ	42	23	37	35	36	21	39	20	33	41	28	35	33	40	29	23	29	29	24	38	28	29	33	32	33	33	42	38	41	28	25	41	41	32	405
37	Michael McDowell	DNQ	33	43	37		37	30		DNQ	36		30				24		7		26		42		18	DNQ		32			35	29	41		30	31	21	255
38	Travis Kvapil		38	39	33	33	33	37	33	36		34			29	43		34			39	25		32			39	38	32	38			6	41				214
39	Ryan Truex **(R)**	DNQ	35	35	42	31	30	DNQ	40	31	31	43	38	32	32	DNQ	41	33	32	36	41	20	39	INQ	37	36	42	42										193
40	Terry Labonte	20									24								11														33					88
41	Jeff Burton			17																20				37	15													87
42	Michael Waltrip	41									25								19														16					76
43	David Stremme						39	DNQ	36	35				37		39		35			DNQ				31		36		40	37								75
44	Timmy Hill			38	43							40			36		QL			41									35	43	33	36		42	35			62
45	Brett Moffitt													22		34					DNQ				42	34						40			40		36	60
46	Bobby Labonte	15																	26		37																	54
47	Parker Kligerman **(R)**	29	42	40	34	42	41	40	30																													54
48	Juan Pablo Montoya															18					23																	47
49	Alex Kennedy														39		39					28	33	34														47
50	Dave Blaney	Wth	DNQ	DNQ	DNQ	Wth	Wth	41	43	DNQ	DNQ	DNQ	DNQ	33	43	Wth						26		33	43													46
51	David Reutimann				DNQ	29	DNQ	38	DNQ	29																												37
52	Boris Said																35						25															28
53	Nelson Piquet Jr.																						26															18
54	Eddie MacDonald																			35																		9
55	Tomy Drissi																38																					6
56	Clay Rogers																										DNQ		43					43		DNQ		2
	David Mayhew																QL																					0
Ineligible for Sprint Cup driver points
Pos.	Driver	DAY	PHO	LVS	BRI	CAL	MAR	TEX	DAR	RCH	TAL	KAN	CLT	DOV	POC	MCH	SON	KEN	DAY	NHA	IND	POC	GLN	MCH	BRI	ATL	RCH	CHI	NHA	DOV	KAN	CLT	TAL	MAR	TEX	PHO	HOM	Pts.
	Landon Cassill	12	DNQ	DNQ	30	25	25	34	25	26	11	42	36	34	33	35	43	32	31	34	30	41	29	29	22	31	34	28	25	35	21	23	4	19	43	29	29	
	Sam Hornish Jr.					17																																
	Trevor Bayne	33		20				19			41		20			19			38		43			41								DNQ	32		39		42	
	Ryan Blaney											27												QL									22					
	Ty Dillon																									25										27		
	Brian Scott	25	32			35					**42**		32																								28	
	Mike Wallace																												34	40	34		38	26		36		
	Kyle Fowler																																	28				
	J. J. Yeley			DNQ				DNQ		40	DNQ	41	DNQ	39	38	36	34							30	33	32	43			39	29	38	42	39	31	30	37	
	Joe Nemechek	DNQ	40	DNQ	41	32	43	DNQ	34	37	DNQ	31	34					38	DNQ			40	30	35		37	40	36					DNQ					
	Blake Koch		37	DNQ									35	30																		39					38	
	Joey Gase																											37			37				37	33		
	Mike Bliss																	41		43						43	35	43		36	43					43		
	Corey LaJoie																												41			35						
	Regan Smith																						37															
	Morgan Shepherd	DNQ	43																	39																		
	Johnny Sauter																					43																
	Eric McClure	DNQ									DNQ																											
	Matt Crafton					QL															DNQ			QL														
Pos.	Driver	DAY	PHO	LVS	BRI	CAL	MAR	TEX	DAR	RCH	TAL	KAN	CLT	DOV	POC	MCH	SON	KEN	DAY	NHA	IND	POC	GLN	MCH	BRI	ATL	RCH	CHI	NHA	DOV	KAN	CLT	TAL	MAR	TEX	PHO	HOM	Pts.

=== Manufacturers' championship ===
Pos	Manufacturer	Wins	Points
1	Chevrolet	20	**1572**
2	Ford	14	**1530**
3	Toyota	2	**1406**

== See also ==
- 2014 NASCAR Nationwide Series
- 2014 NASCAR Camping World Truck Series
- 2014 NASCAR K&N Pro Series East
- 2014 NASCAR K&N Pro Series West
- 2014 NASCAR Whelen Modified Tour
- 2014 NASCAR Whelen Southern Modified Tour
- 2014 NASCAR Canadian Tire Series
- 2014 NASCAR Toyota Series
- 2014 NASCAR Whelen Euro Series
