= Billy Scott (crew chief) =

American crew chief

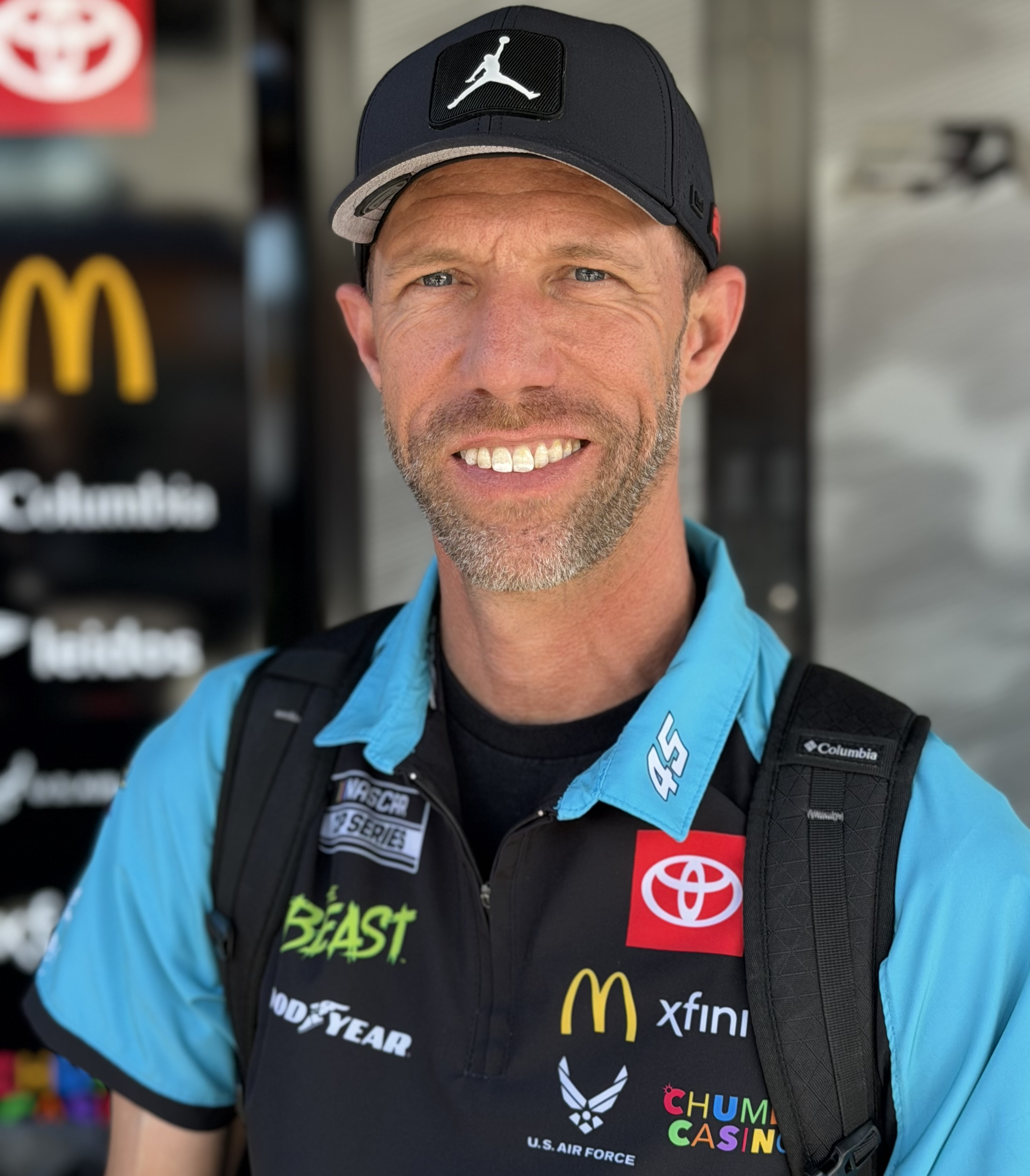
- Scott in 2025

Personal information
- Full name: Billy Scott
- Born: September 6, 1977 (age 49) Land o' Lakes, Florida, U.S.

Sport
- Country: United States
- Sport: Motor racing
- League: NASCAR Cup Series
- Team: 45. 23XI Racing

Billy Scott (born September 6, 1977) is an American NASCAR crew chief who works for 23XI Racing as the crew chief for their No. 45 Toyota Camry driven by Tyler Reddick.

== Racing career ==
=== 2014–2015: Michael Waltrip Racing ===
His first crew chief job came in 2014 when he worked for Michael Waltrip Racing as the crew chief for their No. 55 car driven by Brian Vickers. When Vickers was sidelined due to blood clots at the start of the 2015 season, Scott crew chiefed Michael Waltrip and Brett Moffitt. After Vickers briefly returned, he was sidelined again and was not cleared to race for the rest of the season. After fellow Toyota driver Kyle Busch returned from his injury in the Xfinity Series Daytona 300, his replacement in the No. 18 Joe Gibbs Racing car, David Ragan, moved to MWR to fill in for Vickers in the No. 55 for the rest of the season. Scott and the team's other crew chief, Brian Pattie, would later switch their cars mid-season and Scott moved to the No. 15 of Clint Bowyer.

=== 2016–2019: Stewart–Haas Racing ===
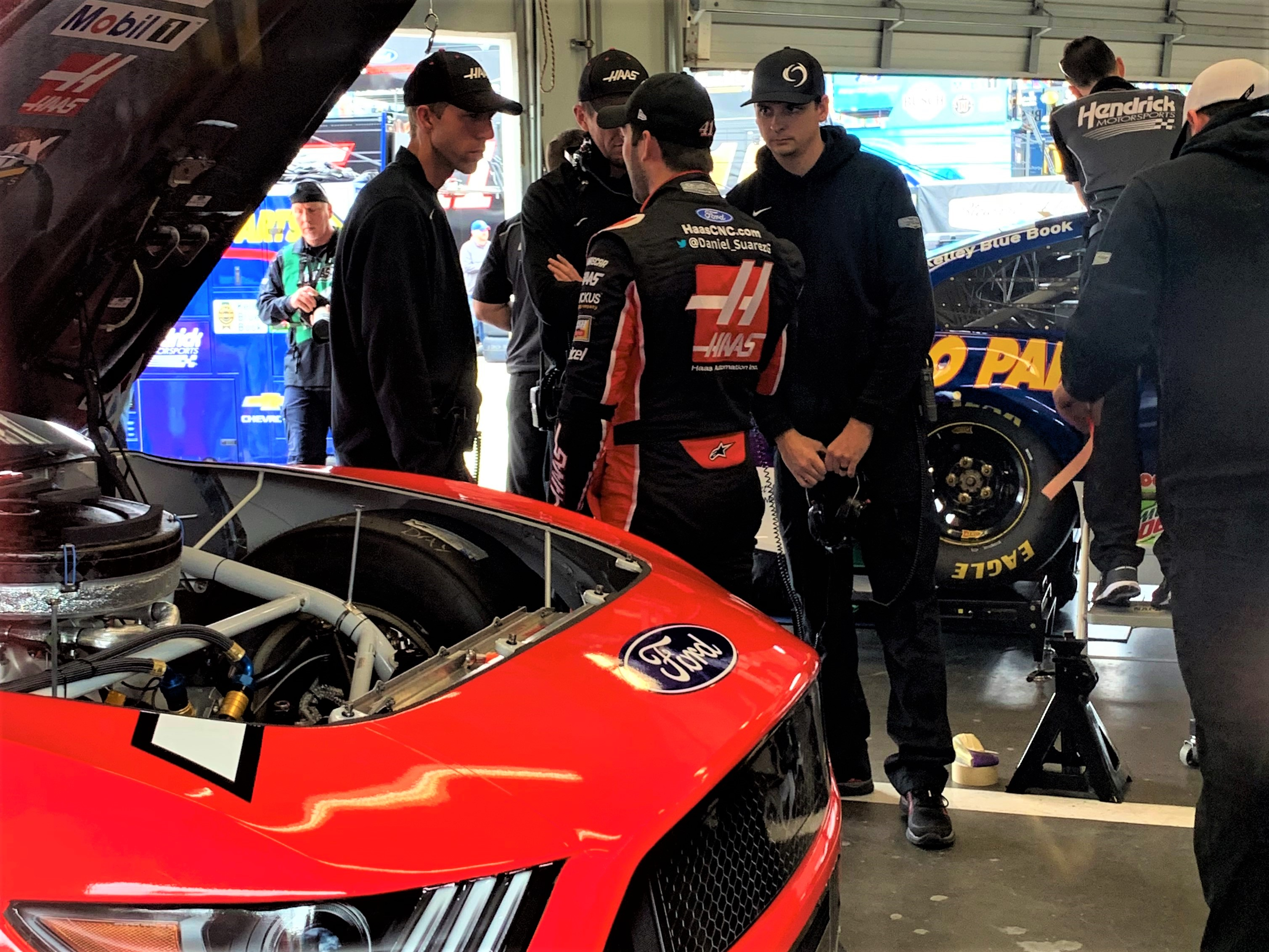
Scott (standing to the left of his driver Daniel Suárez) in the garage next to the No. 41 car during Speedweeks at Daytona in 2019

MWR closed down in 2016 and Scott moved to Stewart–Haas Racing to be the crew chief for Danica Patrick's No. 10 car, replacing Daniel Knost. He returned for a second year with Danica in 2017, which was her last full-time season as a driver in NASCAR. After the retirement of Tony Gibson, who was the crew chief for SHR's No. 41 car of Kurt Busch, Scott moved to that car while Johnny Klausmeier replaced him on the No. 10 car, now driven by Aric Almirola. When Kurt Busch left for Chip Ganassi Racing in 2019, Scott remained the crew chief of the No. 41 car, now driven by Daniel Suárez.

=== 2020–2021: Richard Childress Racing and affiliated teams ===
In 2020, when he and Suárez were let go by SHR and replaced with Cole Custer and Mike Shiplett (previously the driver and crew chief of their Xfinity Series No. 00 car), Scott joined Richard Childress Racing and became the Head of Engineering. In that job, he replaced Justin Alexander, who returned to being a full-time crew chief with RCR. If needed, Scott was also tasked with serving as a part-time or interim crew chief for RCR or an RCR-aligned team. The first time this happened was at the 2020 Daytona 500 when he crew chiefed Kaulig Racing's No. 16 car of Justin Haley. It was Kaulig's first time attempting a Cup Series race. Scott then crew chiefed the No. 23 Our Motorsports car in 2021 in races where the car was driven by Austin Dillon.

=== 2022–present: 23XI Racing ===
On November 2, 2021, Jenna Fryer from the Associated Press mentioned that Scott was likely to be the crew chief for the new No. 45 car for 23XI Racing in 2022, driven by Kurt Busch (who Scott crew chiefed at SHR in 2018), given that 23XI co-owner Denny Hamlin had previously stated to her that the crew chief would be someone who Kurt had worked with in the past and was at the time working for another team. The team officially announced the hiring of Scott as the crew chief for Kurt Busch's No. 45 car on November 16. When Kurt Busch got a concussion in a crash in qualifying for the 2022 Cup Series race at Pocono, Ty Gibbs filled in for him in the No. 45 car starting that weekend. When the playoffs started, Kurt was not ready to return but the No. 45 car was qualified for the owner's playoffs due to its win at Kansas in May. 23XI decided to move Bubba Wallace, the driver of their other car, the No. 23, to the No. 45 to compete for the owner's championship, with Gibbs moving to Wallace's No. 23 car, which did not qualify for the owner's playoffs. Scott and 23XI's other crew chief, Bootie Barker, switched cars along with their drivers, and Scott continued to crew chief Gibbs on the No. 23 car when the playoffs started.
