= 2014 Sprint Unlimited =

Stock car race

2014 Sprint Unlimited at Daytona
Race details
- Race 1 of 2 exhibition races in the 2014 NASCAR Sprint Cup Series
- Date: February 15, 2014
- Location: Daytona International Speedway, Daytona Beach, Florida, United States
- Course: Permanent racing facility
- Course length: 2.5 miles (4 km)
- Distance: 75 laps, 187.5 mi (301.8 km)
- Weather: Clear skies with a temperature of 52 °F (11 °C); wind out of the northwest at 5 miles per hour (8.0 km/h)
- Average speed: 143.160 miles per hour (230.394 km/h)

Pole position
Driver	Denny Hamlin	Joe Gibbs Racing
- Time: 45.030

Most laps led
Driver	Denny Hamlin	Joe Gibbs Racing
- Laps: 27

Winner
No. 11	Denny Hamlin	Joe Gibbs Racing

Television in the United States
- Network: Fox Sports 1 & MRN
- Announcers: Mike Joy, Michael Waltrip and Larry McReynolds (Television); Joe Moore and Barney Hall (Booth); Dave Moody (1 & 2), Mike Bagley (Backstretch) and Jeff Striegle (3 & 4) (Turns) (Radio)
- Nielsen ratings: 2.0/5 (3.562 Million)

The 2014 Sprint Unlimited at Daytona was a NASCAR Sprint Cup Series stock car race that was held on February 15, 2014, at Daytona International Speedway in Daytona Beach, Florida. Contested over 75 laps, it was the first exhibition race of the 2014 Sprint Cup Series season. Denny Hamlin won the race, his second win in the Unlimited, while Brad Keselowski finished second and Kyle Busch finished third. Joey Logano, and Kevin Harvick rounded out the first five finishers.

== Report ==
=== Background ===
Daytona International Speedway, the race track where the race was held.

The track, Daytona International Speedway, is one of six superspeedways to hold NASCAR races, the others being Michigan International Speedway, Auto Club Speedway, Indianapolis Motor Speedway, Pocono Raceway and Talladega Superspeedway. The standard track at Daytona International Speedway is a four-turn superspeedway that is 2.5 miles (4.0 km) long. The track's turns are banked at 31 degrees, while the front stretch, the location of the finish line, is banked at 18 degrees.

=== Practice ===
Dale Earnhardt Jr. was the fastest in the first practice session with a time of 45.358 and a speed of 198.421 mph (319.328 km/h). Denny Hamlin was the fastest in the final practice session with a time of 45.030 and a speed of 199.867 mph (321.655 km/h).

=== Race summary ===
Denny Hamlin led the field to the green flag at 8:29 p.m. but only led the first lap, before Jamie McMurray took the lead. Kyle Busch took the lead from McMurray on lap 11, and held the lead until lap 17, when Kevin Harvick took the lead. Hamlin took back the lead on lap 22 before Harvick reassumed the head of the race the following lap. Hamlin took back the lead again on lap 24. As the field was coming to the conclusion of the first segment – on lap 29 of 30 – Jimmie Johnson, running second, got loose exiting turn 4 and hit the inside wall driver-side. This was the third consecutive year Johnson failed to finish the Unlimited. Brad Keselowski won the race off pit road to take the lead. Hamlin retook the lead not long after, before the race's biggest crash occurred.

Matt Kenseth spun after making contact with Joey Logano, which led to Tony Stewart, Jeff Gordon, Harvick, Kurt Busch, Carl Edwards, Ricky Stenhouse Jr. and Danica Patrick being collected in a nine-car crash. The crash brought out the red flag, which lasted for 11 minutes and 25 seconds. Kenseth put the incident down to him cutting off Joey Logano and failing to leave enough room for his rival upon completion. He also stated that he was "just trying to watch both lanes and I was trying as hard as I could to help my teammate". Gordon described the racing as "bumper cars at 200 miles per hour" and the cars' "closing rate is so severe". The race restarted on lap 41, with Keselowski retaking the lead not long after. Logano cycled through to the front on lap 44, before Hamlin returned to the lead and held the lead until the end of the segment, on lap 55.

As determined by a fan vote, the restart order for the final segment would be the race off pit road following a mandatory pit stop. Hamlin was the first off pit road, but before the race could be restarted, the Chevrolet pace car caught fire. Chevrolet issued a statement the following morning about the incident, stating that an assessment was underway into the cause of the fire. Hamlin led the field to the restart, but his lead was not to last; McMurray and Dale Earnhardt Jr. took spells at the front, before the fourth caution of the race. The caution, with 16 laps to go, was caused when Kyle Busch came down across the nose of Keselowski and got turned in turn 4; for the third time at the exhibition race, Busch again saved the car with minimal damage sustained (He spun out twice in 2012 but survived both and went on to win). The race restarted with twelve laps to go with Earnhardt Jr. at the front, but Logano returned to the lead at the end of the lap. With ten laps to go, Earnhardt Jr. was hooked by Marcos Ambrose into the turn 1 wall.

Reflecting upon the incident, Ambrose stated that he was "trying to help Junior there and ended up hurting him and hurting myself", but also stated that he was apologise to Earnhardt Jr. for his "bad day". On the other side, Earnhardt Jr. did state that he was upset with Ambrose although he did not blame him for the incident, stating that he "can't say really that it was his fault". The race restarted with five laps to go, and after Keselowski had another spell out front, Hamlin took back the lead with two laps to go and built an insurmountable lead to win his second Sprint Unlimited. Hamlin described the race as "survival of the fittest for sure", and that his Joe Gibbs Racing car was "phenomenal". Finishing behind Keselowski, in third place, was Kyle Busch. Busch described his car as "fast and had to save it again", while also praising the performance of teammate Hamlin.

== Results ==
=== Qualifying ===
Grid	No.	Driver	Team	Manufacturer
1	11	Denny Hamlin	Joe Gibbs Racing	Toyota
2	1	Jamie McMurray	Chip Ganassi Racing	Chevrolet
3	17	Ricky Stenhouse Jr.	Roush Fenway Racing	Ford
4	18	Kyle Busch	Joe Gibbs Racing	Toyota
5	2	Brad Keselowski	Team Penske	Ford
6	4	Kevin Harvick	Stewart–Haas Racing	Chevrolet
7	99	Carl Edwards	Roush Fenway Racing	Ford
8	9	Marcos Ambrose	Richard Petty Motorsports	Ford
9	14	Tony Stewart	Stewart–Haas Racing	Chevrolet
10	41	Kurt Busch	Stewart–Haas Racing	Chevrolet
11	22	Joey Logano	Team Penske	Ford
12	10	Danica Patrick	Stewart–Haas Racing	Chevrolet
13	24	Jeff Gordon	Hendrick Motorsports	Chevrolet
14	88	Dale Earnhardt Jr.	Hendrick Motorsports	Chevrolet
15	32	Terry Labonte	Go FAS Racing	Ford
16	20	Matt Kenseth	Joe Gibbs Racing	Toyota
17	31	Ryan Newman	Richard Childress Racing	Chevrolet
18	48	Jimmie Johnson	Hendrick Motorsports	Chevrolet
Note: Starting lineup was set by final practice speeds as determined by the fan vote.

=== Race results ===
Pos	No.	Driver	Team	Manufacturer	Laps
1	11	Denny Hamlin	Joe Gibbs Racing	Toyota	75
2	2	Brad Keselowski	Team Penske	Ford	75
3	18	Kyle Busch	Joe Gibbs Racing	Toyota	75
4	22	Joey Logano	Team Penske	Ford	75
5	4	Kevin Harvick	Stewart–Haas Racing	Chevrolet	75
6	1	Jamie McMurray	Chip Ganassi Racing	Chevrolet	75
7	9	Marcos Ambrose	Richard Petty Motorsports	Ford	75
8	31	Ryan Newman	Richard Childress Racing	Chevrolet	75
9	88	Dale Earnhardt Jr.	Hendrick Motorsports	Chevrolet	65
10	20	Matt Kenseth	Joe Gibbs Racing	Toyota	35
11	14	Tony Stewart	Stewart–Haas Racing	Chevrolet	35
12	24	Jeff Gordon	Hendrick Motorsports	Chevrolet	35
13	99	Carl Edwards	Roush Fenway Racing	Ford	35
14	41	Kurt Busch	Stewart–Haas Racing	Chevrolet	35
15	17	Ricky Stenhouse Jr.	Roush Fenway Racing	Ford	35
16	10	Danica Patrick	Stewart–Haas Racing	Chevrolet	35
17	48	Jimmie Johnson	Hendrick Motorsports	Chevrolet	28
18	32	Terry Labonte	Go FAS Racing	Ford	1

== See also ==
- 2014 UNOH Battle at the Beach, held on February 18
- 2014 Budweiser Duels, held on February 20
- 2014 Daytona 500, held on February 23
