= 2014 NASCAR Sprint All-Star Race =

30th iteration of the NASCAR All-Star Race

Race details
- Date: May 17, 2014
- Location: Charlotte Motor Speedway in Concord, North Carolina
- Course: Permanent racing facility 1.5 mi (2.4 km)
- Distance: Showdown: 40 laps, 60 mi (96.56 km); All-Star Race: 90 laps, 135 mi (217.26 km)
- Avg Speed: Showdown: 117.711 mph (189.437 km/h); All-Star Race: 100.517 mph (161.766 km/h)

Sprint Showdown
- Pole position: Austin Dillon (Richard Childress Racing); 27.747 seconds
- Winner: Clint Bowyer (Michael Waltrip Racing)

Sprint All-Star Race
- Pole position: Carl Edwards; 1:50.268
- Showdown transfers: Clint Bowyer (Showdown winner); A. J. Allmendinger (Showdown runner-up); Josh Wise (fan vote)
- Most laps led: Jamie McMurray (31)
- Winner: Jamie McMurray

Television
- Network: Fox Sports 1 & MRN
- Announcers: Mike Joy, Darrell Waltrip and Larry McReynolds (television); Joe Moore and Barney Hall (Booth); Dave Moody (1 & 2) and Jeff Striegle (3 & 4) (turns) (radio)
- Nielsen Ratings: 2.1/4 (final); 1.7/3 (overnight); 3.482 million viewers

Satellite photo of Charlotte Motor Speedway from 2005

The 2014 NASCAR Sprint All-Star Race (XXX) was a NASCAR Sprint Cup Series stock car race held on May 17, 2014, at Charlotte Motor Speedway in Concord, North Carolina. Contested over 90 laps, it was the second exhibition race of the 2014 NASCAR Sprint Cup Series.

== Report ==
=== Race format ===
The race was 90 laps long, separated into five segments: four segments of 20 laps and a final segment of 10 laps. A mandatory pit stop was utilized between the final two segments, while pitting between the 20 lap segments was optional. Since the inaugural race in 1985, the format has changed ten times. In 2014, the Sprint Showdown was held on Friday –before the North Carolina Education Lottery 200 Camping World Truck Series race – instead of being before the All-Star Race.

=== Entry list ===
The All-Star Race was open to race winners from the 2013 Daytona 500 through the 2014 5-hour Energy 400 at Kansas Speedway and previous All-Star race winners from the past ten years were eligible to compete in the All-Star Race. The drivers who finished first and second in the Sprint Showdown, a 40-lap preliminary race, were also eligible to compete in the race, as well as the Sprint fan vote winner provided that the fan vote winner finished on the lead lap and a car still in race-able condition (the latter condition also applied to the Showdown winner and runner-up). The All-Star Race had 22 drivers, 19 of whom were race winners. The Showdown had 23 drivers of the 30 drivers eligible. Justin Allgaier chose to skip the All-Star weekend and focus on the following week's Coca-Cola 600. Allgaier, 29th in points, said accidents the previous weekends contributed to the team's decision to skip the non-points event. “For us, being a small independent team, obviously, the points races are the main focus,’’ said Allgaier, who was 29th in points. “With crashing a couple of weeks ago at Talladega and crashing last week at Kansas, it puts a toll on a team and this is going to allow us to really hit the reset button. “It’s crazy to think that you crash like that, jump out, walk to the ambulance and go home and wake up the next day and not even feel like you crashed."

==== Sprint Showdown entry list ====
No.	Driver	Team	Manufacturer
3	Austin Dillon (R)	Richard Childress Racing	Chevrolet
7	Michael Annett (R)	Tommy Baldwin Racing	Chevrolet
11	Denny Hamlin	Joe Gibbs Racing	Toyota
13	Casey Mears	Germain Racing	Chevrolet
15	Clint Bowyer	Michael Waltrip Racing	Toyota
17	Ricky Stenhouse Jr.	Roush Fenway Racing	Ford
23	Alex Bowman (R)	BK Racing	Toyota
26	Cole Whitt (R)	BK Racing	Toyota
27	Paul Menard	Richard Childress Racing	Chevrolet
32	Blake Koch	Go FAS Racing	Ford
33	David Stremme	Circle Sport	Chevrolet
36	Reed Sorenson	Tommy Baldwin Racing	Chevrolet
38	David Gilliland	Front Row Motorsports	Ford
40	Landon Cassill	Circle Sport	Chevrolet
42	Kyle Larson (R)	Chip Ganassi Racing	Chevrolet
44	J. J. Yeley	Xxxtreme Motorsports	Chevrolet
47	A. J. Allmendinger	JTG Daugherty Racing	Chevrolet
51	Justin Allgaier (R)	HScott Motorsports	Chevrolet
66	Joe Nemechek (i)	Michael Waltrip Racing	Toyota
77	Dave Blaney	Randy Humphrey Racing	Ford
83	Ryan Truex (R)	BK Racing	Toyota
98	Josh Wise	Phil Parsons Racing	Chevrolet
Official Sprint Showdown entry list

Key	Meaning
(R)	Rookie

==== Sprint All-Star Race entry list ====
No.	Driver	Team	Manufacturer
1	Jamie McMurray	Chip Ganassi Racing	Chevrolet
2	Brad Keselowski	Team Penske	Ford
4	Kevin Harvick	Stewart–Haas Racing	Chevrolet
5	Kasey Kahne	Hendrick Motorsports	Chevrolet
11	Denny Hamlin	Joe Gibbs Racing	Toyota
14	Tony Stewart	Stewart–Haas Racing	Chevrolet
16	Greg Biffle	Roush Fenway Racing	Ford
18	Kyle Busch	Joe Gibbs Racing	Toyota
20	Matt Kenseth	Joe Gibbs Racing	Toyota
22	Joey Logano	Team Penske	Ford
24	Jeff Gordon	Hendrick Motorsports	Chevrolet
31	Ryan Newman	Richard Childress Racing	Chevrolet
34	David Ragan	Front Row Motorsports	Ford
41	Kurt Busch	Stewart–Haas Racing	Chevrolet
48	Jimmie Johnson	Hendrick Motorsports	Chevrolet
55	Brian Vickers	Michael Waltrip Racing	Toyota
78	Martin Truex Jr.	Furniture Row Racing	Chevrolet
88	Dale Earnhardt Jr.	Hendrick Motorsports	Chevrolet
99	Carl Edwards	Roush Fenway Racing	Ford
Official Sprint All-Star Race entry list

== Practice ==
=== Sprint Showdown practice ===
Kyle Larson was the fastest in the sole Sprint Showdown practice session with a time of 27.820 and a speed of 194.105 mph (312.382 km/h).

Pos	No.	Driver	Team	Manufacturer	Time	Speed
1	42	Kyle Larson (R)	Chip Ganassi Racing	Chevrolet	27.820	194.105
2	43	Aric Almirola	Richard Petty Motorsports	Ford	28.061	192.438
3	15	Clint Bowyer	Michael Waltrip Racing	Toyota	28.062	192.431
Official Sprint Showdown practice results

=== Sprint All-Star Race practice ===
Dale Earnhardt Jr. was the fastest in the sole All-Star Race practice session with a time of 27.898 and a speed of 193.562 mph (311.508 km/h).

Pos	No.	Driver	Team	Manufacturer	Time	Speed
1	88	Dale Earnhardt Jr.	Hendrick Motorsports	Chevrolet	27.898	193.562
2	55	Brian Vickers	Michael Waltrip Racing	Toyota	27.924	193.382
3	11	Denny Hamlin	Joe Gibbs Racing	Toyota	27.940	193.271
Official Sprint All-Star Race practice results

== Sprint Showdown qualifying ==
Austin Dillon won the pole for the Showdown with a time of 27.747 and a speed of 194.616 mph (313.204 km/h).

=== Sprint Showdown qualifying results ===
Pos	No.	Driver	Team	Manufacturer	Time
1	3	Austin Dillon (R)	Richard Childress Racing	Chevrolet	27.747
2	47	A. J. Allmendinger	JTG Daugherty Racing	Chevrolet	27.821
3	42	Kyle Larson (R)	Chip Ganassi Racing	Chevrolet	27.833
4	15	Clint Bowyer	Michael Waltrip Racing	Toyota	27.860
5	9	Marcos Ambrose	Richard Petty Motorsports	Ford	27.889
6	27	Paul Menard	Richard Childress Racing	Chevrolet	27.961
7	10	Danica Patrick	Stewart–Haas Racing	Chevrolet	28.009
8	17	Ricky Stenhouse Jr.	Roush Fenway Racing	Ford	28.034
9	13	Casey Mears	Germain Racing	Chevrolet	28.064
10	43	Aric Almirola	Richard Petty Motorsports	Ford	28.283
11	26	Cole Whitt (R)	BK Racing	Toyota	28.318
12	44	J. J. Yeley	Xxxtreme Motorsports	Chevrolet	28.369
13	23	Alex Bowman (R)	BK Racing	Toyota	28.558
14	77	Dave Blaney	Randy Humphrey Racing	Ford	28.579
15	38	David Gilliland	Front Row Motorsports	Ford	28.665
16	98	Josh Wise	Phil Parsons Racing	Chevrolet	28.714
17	7	Michael Annett (R)	Tommy Baldwin Racing	Chevrolet	28.831
18	40	Landon Cassill	Circle Sport	Chevrolet	28.914
19	83	Ryan Truex (R)	BK Racing	Toyota	28.940
20	36	Reed Sorenson	Tommy Baldwin Racing	Chevrolet	29.091
21	66	Joe Nemechek	Michael Waltrip Racing	Toyota	29.153
22	32	Blake Koch	Go FAS Racing	Ford	29.399
23	33	David Stremme	Circle Sport	Chevrolet	30.383
Withdrew
WD	51	Justin Allgaier	HScott Motorsports	Chevrolet	—
Official Sprint Showdown qualifying results

== Sprint Showdown ==
The Showdown started at 7:22 p.m. on Friday. Marcos Ambrose got nicked in the rear by Ricky Stenhouse Jr. and spun out to bring out the first caution on lap 3. Clint Bowyer took the lead from A. J. Allmendinger at the end of segment one. Michael Annett stayed out during the caution period and assumed the lead. He spun the tires on the restart and just about took a few cars out. Clint Bowyer took the victory in the Showdown, advancing to the Sprint All-Star Race along with Allmendinger. Josh Wise advanced to the All-Star Race by winning the fan vote. "This is kind of a big deal for our sport," Wise said after the Showdown Friday night. "It's a lot of young kids and people from around the world. I've had the chance to interact with a lot of them, and there's a lot of people who had never watched a NASCAR race who have now watched several, so it's a pretty cool deal."

=== Sprint Showdown results ===
Pos	Grid	Car	Driver	Team	Manufacturer	Laps run	Segments	
Pos	Grid	Car	Driver	Team	Manufacturer	Laps run	1	2
1	4	15	Clint Bowyer	Michael Waltrip Racing	Toyota	40	1	1
2	2	47	A. J. Allmendinger	JTG Daugherty Racing	Chevrolet	40	2	2
3	9	13	Casey Mears	Germain Racing	Chevrolet	40	6	3
4	5	9	Marcos Ambrose	Richard Petty Motorsports	Ford	40	7	4
5	10	43	Aric Almirola	Richard Petty Motorsports	Ford	40	10	5
6	3	42	Kyle Larson (R)	Chip Ganassi Racing	Chevrolet	40	8	6
7	8	17	Ricky Stenhouse Jr.	Roush Fenway Racing	Ford	40	5	7
8	1	3	Austin Dillon (R)	Richard Childress Racing	Chevrolet	40	3	8
9	6	27	Paul Menard	Richard Childress Racing	Chevrolet	40	4	9
10	7	10	Danica Patrick	Stewart–Haas Racing	Chevrolet	40	9	10
11	15	38	David Gilliland	Front Row Motorsports	Ford	40	15	11
12	11	26	Cole Whitt (R)	BK Racing	Toyota	40	12	12
13	13	23	Alex Bowman (R)	BK Racing	Toyota	40	11	13
14	14	77	Dave Blaney	Randy Humphrey Racing	Ford	40	21	14
15	17	7	Michael Annett (R)	Tommy Baldwin Racing	Chevrolet	40	13	15
16	21	66	Joe Nemechek	Michael Waltrip Racing	Toyota	40	19	16
17	18	40	Landon Cassill	Circle Sport	Chevrolet	40	20	17
18	16	98	Josh Wise	Phil Parsons Racing	Chevrolet	40	16	18
19	19	83	Ryan Truex (R)	BK Racing	Toyota	40	17	19
20	12	44	J. J. Yeley	Xxxtreme Motorsports	Chevrolet	40	14	20
21	20	36	Reed Sorenson	Tommy Baldwin Racing	Chevrolet	40	18	21
22	22	32	Blake Koch	Go FAS Racing	Ford	40	23	22
23	23	33	David Stremme	Circle Sport	Chevrolet	25	22	23

== Sprint All-Star Race qualifying ==
Carl Edwards won the pole for the second year in a row for the All-Star Race with a cumulative time of 1:50.268 and a speed of 146.915 mph (236.437 km/h). For the first time, the three drivers who transferred from the Showdown participated in All-Star Race qualifying, rather than automatically starting at the rear of the all-star field. They could work on their cars prior to the NASCAR Sprint All-Star Race.

=== Sprint All-Star Race qualifying ===
Pos	No.	Driver	Team	Manufacturer	Time
1	99	Carl Edwards	Roush Fenway Racing	Ford	1:50.268
2	18	Kyle Busch	Joe Gibbs Racing	Toyota	1:51.118
3	4	Kevin Harvick	Stewart–Haas Racing	Chevrolet	1:51.294
4	24	Jeff Gordon	Hendrick Motorsports	Chevrolet	1:51.385
5	48	Jimmie Johnson	Hendrick Motorsports	Chevrolet	1:51.393
6	88	Dale Earnhardt Jr.	Hendrick Motorsports	Chevrolet	1:51.639
7	5	Kasey Kahne	Hendrick Motorsports	Chevrolet	1:51.704
8	20	Matt Kenseth	Joe Gibbs Racing	Toyota	1:51.873
9	15	Clint Bowyer	Michael Waltrip Racing	Toyota	1:52.244
10	22	Joey Logano	Team Penske	Ford	1:52.586
11	1	Jamie McMurray	Chip Ganassi Racing	Chevrolet	1:52.733
12	78	Martin Truex Jr.	Furniture Row Racing	Chevrolet	1:53.105
13	2	Brad Keselowski	Team Penske	Ford	1:53.531
14	16	Greg Biffle	Roush Fenway Racing	Ford	1:54.064
15	14	Tony Stewart (Note: Tony Stewart started from the rear for unapproved adjustments.)	Stewart–Haas Racing	Chevrolet	1:56.021
16	55	Brian Vickers	Michael Waltrip Racing	Toyota	1:56.428
17	47	A. J. Allmendinger	JTG Daugherty Racing	Chevrolet	1:56.719
18	41	Kurt Busch	Stewart–Haas Racing	Chevrolet	1:57.399
19	98	Josh Wise	Phil Parsons Racing	Chevrolet	2:01.190
20	34	David Ragan	Front Row Motorsports	Ford	2:05.878
21	31	Ryan Newman (Note: Ryan Newman started from the rear for unapproved adjustments.)	Richard Childress Racing	Chevrolet	2:10.779
22	11	Denny Hamlin	Joe Gibbs Racing	Toyota	2:11.219
Official Sprint All-Star Race qualifying results

== NASCAR Sprint All-Star Race ==
The All-Star Race was scheduled to begin at 9:20 p.m. on Saturday but was pushed back by almost half an hour. In segments one, two and three, all laps were counted, with teams having the option to pit during the breaks. In segment four, all laps were counted, with the running order at the completion of the segment being repositioned, based on the average finish of the first four segments. Running order ties were broken by the finish of the fourth segment. Pit road was open for a mandatory four-tire pit stop, with the order of cars returning to the track determining the starting order of the fifth and final segment. Only green flag laps counted in the final segment.

=== Segment one ===
Kyle Busch took the lead from Carl Edwards and kept it through the first segment. During the optional pit stops, everybody but Denny Hamlin pitted.

=== Segment two ===
On lap 26, in the second segment, Kyle Busch and Clint Bowyer made contact on the backstretch, with Busch hitting the wall and taking out Joey Logano. "Kurt (Busch) got real bottled up on the outside and slowed down so I knew I was clear to go to the bottom and swoop down and try to get underneath Bowyer," Kyle Busch said. "When I did, he blocked me and I hit him and he got squirrely and then I was still under him and it hit me and turned me around the wrong way on the backstretch and got in the outside wall." Logano stated that "they were just crashing in front of me", and that he "thought he was going to stay up by the wall and he started coming down. I was in the wrong spot and I couldn't get low enough quick enough as quick as he was coming down." On lap 31, A. J. Allmendinger was turned by Brian Vickers, who was pushed by Greg Biffle, and hit the inside wall on the backstretch. On lap 37, Hamlin started falling to the rear. Kasey Kahne finished in the lead at the end of segment two; just like the break in the first segment, everybody but four cars pitted. Kahne led at the end of segment three as well, with everybody pitting after the segment.

=== Segment three ===
After restarting on lap 61, Jeff Gordon veered up in front of Martin Truex Jr. and Biffle, and hit the wall to bring out the sixth caution. "Something broke, I'm not exactly sure what," Gordon said. "I was just going down the backstraightaway going into Turn 3 and I just felt something in the front end give. As I got to the corner, the car went straight."

=== Segment four ===
With three laps remaining in segment four, Ryan Newman slammed the wall in turn 4. Kevin Harvick led at the end of segment four and Kahne hit the wall. Harvick led the field down pit road since he had the best average finish in the four segments. Kahne had the second best in the four segments and therefore would've entered pit road second but did not because of pitting before pit road was open. Because of this, Jamie McMurray did.

=== Final segment ===
On the final, mandatory, four-tire stop, Carl Edwards won the race off pit road. On the restart, Jamie McMurray took the lead from Carl Edwards and took the checkered flag. "As a kid, that is what you grew up wanting to do, is have a shootout like that and have a possibility to race for 10 laps," McMurray said. "He got a little bit of a jump on me on the restart and I was able to hang on to his quarter panel, and when we kept entering Turn 1 and 3, I was like, "It is for a million bucks. If we wreck, it's not that big of a deal." It's so cool to come out on top."

=== Sprint All-Star Race results ===
Pos	Car	Driver	Team	Manufacturer	Laps run	Segments				
Pos	Car	Driver	Team	Manufacturer	Laps run	1	2	3	4	5
1	1	Jamie McMurray	Chip Ganassi Racing	Chevrolet	90	11	10	3	2	1
2	4	Kevin Harvick	Stewart–Haas Racing	Chevrolet	90	3	3	3	1	2
3	20	Matt Kenseth	Joe Gibbs Racing	Toyota	90	9	11	5	7	3
4	88	Dale Earnhardt Jr.	Hendrick Motorsports	Chevrolet	90	8	8	7	8	4
5	99	Carl Edwards	Roush Fenway Racing	Ford	90	5	3	13	10	5
6	48	Jimmie Johnson	Hendrick Motorsports	Chevrolet	90	6	6	6	11	6
7	15	Clint Bowyer	Michael Waltrip Racing	Toyota	90	7	13	14	9	7
8	55	Brian Vickers	Michael Waltrip Racing	Toyota	90	14	9	9	5	8
9	11	Denny Hamlin	Joe Gibbs Racing	Toyota	90	19	19	12	6	9
10	2	Brad Keselowski	Team Penske	Ford	90	13	14	4	3	10
11	41	Kurt Busch	Stewart–Haas Racing	Chevrolet	90	18	5	15	4	11
12	14	Tony Stewart	Stewart–Haas Racing	Chevrolet	90	20	16	17	13	12
13	34	David Ragan	Front Row Motorsports	Ford	90	21	18	18	14	13
14	5	Kasey Kahne	Hendrick Motorsports	Chevrolet	90	4	1	1	12	14
15	98	Josh Wise	Phil Parsons Racing	Chevrolet	90	22	17	19	15	15
16	31	Ryan Newman	Richard Childress Racing	Chevrolet	77	15	12	11	16	16
17	24	Jeff Gordon	Hendrick Motorsports	Chevrolet	60	2	7	8	17	17
18	78	Martin Truex Jr.	Furniture Row Racing	Chevrolet	60	17	15	10	18	18
19	16	Greg Biffle	Roush Fenway Racing	Ford	60	16	4	16	19	19
20	47	A. J. Allmendinger	JTG Daugherty Racing	Chevrolet	30	12	20	20	20	20
21	18	Kyle Busch	Joe Gibbs Racing	Toyota	25	1	21	21	21	21
22	22	Joey Logano	Team Penske	Ford	25	10	22	22	22	22

== Media ==
=== Television ===
Fox Sports 1
Booth announcers	Pit reporters
Lap-by-lap: Mike Joy; Color-commentator: Larry McReynolds; Color commentator: Darrell Waltrip	Matt Yocum; Steve Byrnes; Krista Voda; Jeff Hammond

=== Radio ===
MRN Radio
Booth announcers	Turn announcers	Pit reporters
Lead announcer: Joe Moore; Announcer: Barney Hall	Turns 1 & 2: Dave Moody; Turns 3 & 4: Jeff Striegle	Winston Kelly; Steve Post; Alex Hayden; Woody Cain

== Notes ==
Previous race: 2014 5-hour Energy 400	Sprint Cup Series; 2014 season	Next race: 2014 Coca-Cola 600
