= Daniel Knost =

American stock car racing crew chief

Personal information
- Born: December 21, 1978 (age 47) Charlotte, North Carolina, U.S.

Sport
- Country: United States
- Sport: NASCAR Sprint Cup Series

Daniel Knost (born December 21, 1978) is an American stock car racing crew chief. He used to be the crew chief for the Stewart–Haas Racing No. 10 Chevrolet in the NASCAR Sprint Cup Series with driver Danica Patrick. Having joined the team in 2008, he acted as race engineer for Ryan Newman's No. 39 car. He was also race engineer for Danica Patrick during eight races in the 2012 season.

Knost is married to Nicole and is a father.
