= 2014 Budweiser Duels =

Race details
- Location: Daytona International Speedway in Daytona Beach, Florida
- Course: Permanent racing facility 2.5 mi (4 km)
- Distance: Race 1: 60 laps, 150 mi (240 km); Race 2: 60 laps, 150 mi (240 km)
- Avg Speed: Race 1: 192.259 mph (309.411 km/h); Race 2: 192.651 mph (310.042 km/h)
- Weather: Mostly clear with a temperature of 73 °F (23 °C); wind out of the southeast at 15 miles per hour (24 km/h)

Race 1
- Pole position: Austin Dillon (Richard Childress Racing); 45.914 seconds
- Most laps led: Matt Kenseth (Joe Gibbs Racing) (31)
- Winner: Matt Kenseth (Joe Gibbs Racing)

Race 2
- Pole position: Martin Truex Jr. (Furniture Row Racing); 45.953
- Most laps led: Brad Keselowski (Team Penske) (34)
- Winner: Denny Hamlin (Joe Gibbs Racing)

Television
- Network: Fox Sports 1 & MRN
- Announcers: Mike Joy, Darrell Waltrip and Larry McReynolds (Television); Joe Moore and Barney Hall (Booth); Dave Moody (1 & 2), Mike Bagley (Backstretch) and Jeff Striegle (3 & 4) (Turns) (Radio)
- Nielsen Ratings: 2.0 (3.122 Million)

The 2014 Budweiser Duels were a pair of NASCAR Sprint Cup Series stock car races that were held on February 20, 2014, at Daytona International Speedway in Daytona Beach, Florida. Both contested over 60 laps, they were the qualifying races for the 2014 Daytona 500. Joe Gibbs Racing swept the Duel races, with Matt Kenseth winning the first race. Kevin Harvick finished second, while Kasey Kahne, Marcos Ambrose and Dale Earnhardt Jr. rounded out the top five. Denny Hamlin won the second race, ahead of Jeff Gordon, while Kurt Busch, Paul Menard and Brian Scott rounded out the top five.

These were the first Budweiser Duel races to be held in primetime, as the races were previously held in the early afternoon. The Duels were telecast on Fox Sports 1.

== Report ==
=== Background ===
Daytona International Speedway, where the races were held.

Daytona International Speedway is one of six superspeedways to hold NASCAR races, the others being Michigan International Speedway, Auto Club Speedway, Indianapolis Motor Speedway, Pocono Raceway and Talladega Superspeedway. The standard track at Daytona International Speedway is a four-turn superspeedway that is 2.5 miles (4.0 km) long. The track's turns are banked at 31 degrees, while the front stretch, the location of the finish line, is banked at 18 degrees.

=== Practice and qualifying ===
A. J. Allmendinger was the fastest in the first of two practice sessions for the Duel races with a time of 45.096 and a speed of 199.574 mph (321.183 km/h). Matt Kenseth, Joey Logano, Paul Menard, Dave Blaney, Ryan Truex, Trevor Bayne and Parker Kligerman were involved in a crash on the frontstretch of Daytona during early practice on February 19, that resulted in heavy damage for Logano, Menard, Blaney, Truex, and Kligerman. This forced the teams to set up backup cars for the Duel races the following evening. Workers had to repair two sections of the catch fencing, ending practice early. Brian Vickers and Cole Whitt were also involved in a crash earlier during this practice, forcing Vickers to a backup car while Whitt's team was forced to repair their primary, as Swan Racing's only backup was given to Kligerman. Blaney eventually withdrew from the race after his team could not secure a backup car. Kligerman stated that it was the first flip of his career, and that he "assumed it would be rougher. It was pretty soft. I was up in the fence floating along. Then it just slid over softly". Logano stated that Kenseth had "started making a move to go down" and that he "was making the run, and I was going to fill that hole. He started to come back up and I was there". Denny Hamlin was the fastest in the second of two practice sessions for the Duel races with a time of 45.096 and a speed of 199.574 mph (321.183 km/h).

=== Races ===
==== Race 1 ====
Austin Dillon led the field to the green flag at 7:16 p.m., and after leading the first 14 laps, Dillon lost the lead to Dale Earnhardt Jr. on lap 15. Matt Kenseth took the lead on lap 28, and held the lead until lap 37, when he pitted and the lead was passed to Earnhardt Jr. once again. Earnhardt Jr. and Kasey Kahne each held the lead for a lap before Kenseth cycled back to the lead with 21 laps to go. On the last lap, Kevin Harvick pulled up alongside Matt Kenseth, while Kahne got to the inside, creating a three-wide photo finish in which Kenseth prevailed. Michael McDowell and Joe Nemechek failed to make the Daytona 500. Kenseth stated that he "was kind of embarrassed to walk in the garage" but felt that his race performance "builds confidence in all of us, makes us feel like you can go out and get the job done if everybody does their jobs and we do everything right". Harvick's car failed post-race inspection because his car exceeded the maximum split on the track bar. He was disqualified, but his speed in qualifying was enough to get him into the Daytona 500. Greg Zipadelli, the competitions director at Harvick's team – Stewart–Haas Racing – referred to the infraction as "an adjustment during the race and it was more than it should have been".

==== Race 2 ====
Martin Truex Jr. led the field to the green flag at 8:40 p.m., and Brad Keselowski took the lead on lap 2. Keselowski held the race lead for the next portion of the race, holding it until his pit stop on lap 36, which handed the lead to Casey Mears. On his pit stop, Keselowski was deemed to have been speeding while exiting, and had to serve a pass-through penalty. Denny Hamlin took the lead with 23 laps to go, and maintained the race lead until the end of the race, winning under caution.

Coming through turn four on the final lap, Jimmie Johnson ran out of gas, got loose after being tapped in the left corner panel, overcorrected and hit the wall collecting Jamie McMurray in the process. Truex Jr. had no way to avoid the wreck and rear-ended McMurray. While slowing to avoid the wreck, Clint Bowyer got rear-ended by Ryan Truex, slid to the runoff area taking David Ragan with him. Bowyer flipped over in the air and landed on all four wheels with the only damage being a destroyed drive-train. Ragan and Michael Waltrip were also caught in the wreck and both hit the inside wall head-on. Carl Edwards was caught by McMurray, but sustained minimal damage. McMurray made contact with Johnson again as they continued on into the grass, destroying the front ends of their cars. Bobby Labonte and Terry Labonte, who were both 30 seconds behind the leader on the final lap, raced their way into the Daytona 500, at the expense of Eric McClure, Morgan Shepherd and Ryan Truex. Hamlin's team owner, Joe Gibbs, stated Hamlin had "worked extremely hard" for the result, and he thought his team was "all hungry when the year started".

== Results ==
=== Duel 1 ===
==== Qualifying ====
Grid	No.	Driver	Team	Manufacturer	Time	Speed
1	3	Austin Dillon (R)	Richard Childress Racing	Chevrolet	45.914	196.019
2	16	Greg Biffle	Roush Fenway Racing	Ford	45.961	195.818
3	31	Ryan Newman	Richard Childress Racing	Chevrolet	45.987	195.707
4	88	Dale Earnhardt Jr.	Hendrick Motorsports	Chevrolet	46.104	195.211
5	17	Ricky Stenhouse Jr.	Roush Fenway Racing	Ford	46.153	195.004
6	9	Marcos Ambrose	Richard Petty Motorsports	Ford	46.179	194.894
7	43	Aric Almirola	Richard Petty Motorsports	Ford	46.235	194.658
8	22	Joey Logano (Note: Driver started at the rear of the field, for changing to a backup car post-qualifying.)	Team Penske	Ford	46.253	194.582
9	20	Matt Kenseth	Joe Gibbs Racing	Toyota	46.255	194.574
10	5	Kasey Kahne	Hendrick Motorsports	Chevrolet	46.262	194.544
11	18	Kyle Busch	Joe Gibbs Racing	Toyota	46.272	194.502
12	4	Kevin Harvick	Stewart–Haas Racing	Chevrolet	46.291	194.422
13	10	Danica Patrick	Stewart–Haas Racing	Chevrolet	46.301	194.380
14	47	A. J. Allmendinger	JTG Daugherty Racing	Chevrolet	46.366	194.108
15	36	Reed Sorenson	Tommy Baldwin Racing	Chevrolet	46.376	194.066
16	38	David Gilliland	Front Row Motorsports	Ford	46.455	193.736
17	30	Parker Kligerman (R)	Swan Racing	Toyota	46.489	193.594
18	14	Tony Stewart (Note: Tony Stewart started at the rear of the field, for a post-qualifying engine change.)	Stewart–Haas Racing	Chevrolet	46.544	193.365
19	55	Brian Vickers	Michael Waltrip Racing	Toyota	46.681	192.798
20	26	Cole Whitt (R)	Swan Racing	Toyota	46.744	192.538
21	95	Michael McDowell	Leavine Family Racing	Ford	46.804	192.291
22	98	Josh Wise	Phil Parsons Racing	Ford	46.860	192.061
23	87	Joe Nemechek	Identity Ventures Racing	Toyota	47.249	190.480
24	23	Alex Bowman (R)	BK Racing	Toyota	47.447	189.685
25	77	Dave Blaney (Note: Dave Blaney withdrew from the Daytona 500 after wrecking his primary car in the pre-qualifying practice session. He was unable to secure a backup car.)	Randy Humphrey Racing	Ford	No time	No speed

==== Race results ====
Pos	Grid	No.	Driver	Team	Manufacturer	Laps	Status	Led
1	9	20	Matt Kenseth	Joe Gibbs Racing	Toyota	60	Running	31
2	10	5	Kasey Kahne	Hendrick Motorsports	Chevrolet	60	Running	1
3	6	9	Marcos Ambrose	Richard Petty Motorsports	Ford	60	Running	
4	4	88	Dale Earnhardt Jr.	Hendrick Motorsports	Chevrolet	60	Running	14
5	22	98	Josh Wise	Phil Parsons Racing	Ford	60	Running	
6	7	43	Aric Almirola	Richard Petty Motorsports	Ford	60	Running	
7	14	47	A. J. Allmendinger	JTG Daugherty Racing	Chevrolet	60	Running	
8	16	38	David Gilliland	Front Row Motorsports	Ford	60	Running	
9	3	31	Ryan Newman	Richard Childress Racing	Chevrolet	60	Running	
10	18	14	Tony Stewart	Stewart–Haas Racing	Chevrolet	60	Running	
11	20	26	Cole Whitt (R)	Swan Racing	Toyota	60	Running	
12	2	16	Greg Biffle	Roush Fenway Racing	Ford	60	Running	
13	13	10	Danica Patrick	Stewart–Haas Racing	Chevrolet	60	Running	
14	24	23	Alex Bowman (R)	BK Racing	Toyota	60	Running	
15	19	55	Brian Vickers	Michael Waltrip Racing	Toyota	60	Running	
16	8	22	Joey Logano	Team Penske	Ford	60	Running	
17	17	30	Parker Kligerman (R)	Swan Racing	Toyota	60	Running	
18	1	3	Austin Dillon (R)	Richard Childress Racing	Chevrolet	60	Running	14
19	5	17	Ricky Stenhouse Jr.	Roush Fenway Racing	Ford	60	Running	
20	11	18	Kyle Busch	Joe Gibbs Racing	Toyota	60	Running	
21	21	95	Michael McDowell	Leavine Family Racing	Ford	59	Running	
22	23	87	Joe Nemechek	Identity Ventures Racing	Toyota	59	Running	
23	15	36	Reed Sorenson	Tommy Baldwin Racing	Chevrolet	20	Wheel Bearing	
24	12	4	Kevin Harvick	Stewart–Haas Racing	Chevrolet	60	Disqualified	
Race Results

=== Duel 2 ===
==== Qualifying ====
Grid	No.	Driver	Team	Manufacturer	Time	Speed
1	78	Martin Truex Jr.	Furniture Row Racing	Chevrolet	45.953	195.852
2	99	Carl Edwards	Roush Fenway Racing	Ford	45.986	195.712
3	2	Brad Keselowski	Team Penske	Ford	46.084	195.296
4	24	Jeff Gordon	Hendrick Motorsports	Chevrolet	46.144	195.042
5	27	Paul Menard	Richard Childress Racing	Chevrolet	46.173	194.919
6	33	Brian Scott	Richard Childress Racing	Chevrolet	46.207	194.776
7	48	Jimmie Johnson	Hendrick Motorsports	Chevrolet	46.240	194.637
8	13	Casey Mears	Germain Racing	Chevrolet	46.253	194.582
9	7	Michael Annett (R)	Tommy Baldwin Racing	Chevrolet	46.255	194.574
10	15	Clint Bowyer	Michael Waltrip Racing	Toyota	46.267	194.523
11	11	Denny Hamlin	Joe Gibbs Racing	Toyota	46.278	194.477
12	42	Kyle Larson (R)	Chip Ganassi Racing	Chevrolet	46.294	194.410
13	21	Trevor Bayne	Wood Brothers Racing	Ford	46.312	194.334
14	41	Kurt Busch	Stewart–Haas Racing	Chevrolet	46.373	194.078
15	51	Justin Allgaier (R)	HScott Motorsports	Chevrolet	46.436	193.815
16	40	Landon Cassill	Hillman-Circle Sport LLC	Chevrolet	46.456	193.732
17	66	Michael Waltrip	Michael Waltrip Racing	Toyota	46.529	193.428
18	35	Eric McClure	Front Row Motorsports	Ford	46.655	192.905
19	1	Jamie McMurray	Chip Ganassi Racing	Chevrolet	46.706	192.695
20	34	David Ragan	Front Row Motorsports	Ford	46.795	192.328
21	32	Terry Labonte	Go FAS Racing	Ford	46.842	192.135
22	52	Bobby Labonte	HScott Motorsports	Chevrolet	46.999	191.493
23	83	Ryan Truex (R)	BK Racing	Toyota	47.282	190.347
24	93	Morgan Shepherd	BK Racing	Toyota	47.483	189.542

==== Race results ====
Pos	No.	Driver	Team	Manufacturer	Laps	Time/Retired	Led
1	11	Denny Hamlin	Joe Gibbs Racing	Toyota	60	Running	23
2	24	Jeff Gordon	Hendrick Motorsports	Chevrolet	60	Running	0
3	41	Kurt Busch	Stewart–Haas Racing	Chevrolet	60	Running	0
4	27	Paul Menard	Richard Childress Racing	Chevrolet	60	Running	0
5	33	Brian Scott	Richard Childress Racing	Chevrolet	60	Running	0
6	21	Trevor Bayne	Wood Brothers Racing	Ford	60	Running	0
7	42	Kyle Larson (R)	Chip Ganassi Racing	Chevrolet	60	Running	0
8	78	Martin Truex Jr.	Furniture Row Racing	Chevrolet	60	Running	1
9	40	Landon Cassill	Hillman-Circle Sport LLC	Chevrolet	60	Running	0
10	15	Clint Bowyer	Michael Waltrip Racing	Toyota	60	Running	0
11	1	Jamie McMurray	Chip Ganassi Racing	Chevrolet	60	Running	0
12	32	Terry Labonte	Go FAS Racing	Ford	60	Running	0
13	52	Bobby Labonte	HScott Motorsports	Chevrolet	60	Running	0
14	13	Casey Mears	Germain Racing	Chevrolet	60	Running	2
15	99	Carl Edwards	Roush Fenway Racing	Ford	60	Running	0
16	48	Jimmie Johnson	Hendrick Motorsports	Chevrolet	59	Accident	0
17	34	David Ragan	Front Row Motorsports	Ford	59	Accident	0
18	66	Michael Waltrip	Michael Waltrip Racing	Toyota	59	Accident	0
19	83	Ryan Truex (R)	BK Racing	Toyota	59	Running	0
20	51	Justin Allgaier (R)	HScott Motorsports	Chevrolet	59	Running	0
21	7	Michael Annett (R)	Tommy Baldwin Racing	Chevrolet	59	Running	0
22	93	Morgan Shepherd	BK Racing	Toyota	59	Running	0
23	35	Eric McClure	Front Row Motorsports	Ford	57	Running	0
24	2	Brad Keselowski	Team Penske	Ford	57	Running	34
Race Results
