= 2014 Hollywood Casino 400 =

Race details
- Race 30 of 36 in the 2014 NASCAR Sprint Cup Series
- Date: October 5, 2014
- Location: Kansas Speedway in Kansas City, Kansas
- Course: Permanent racing facility
- Course length: 1.5 miles (2.4 km)
- Distance: 267 laps, 400.5 mi (644.5 km)
- Weather: Sunny with a temperature of 70 °F (21 °C); wind out of the northwest at 14 miles per hour (23 km/h)
- Average speed: 141.951 mph (228.448 km/h)

Pole position
Driver	Kevin Harvick	Stewart–Haas Racing
- Time: 27.325

Most laps led
Driver	Joey Logano	Team Penske
- Laps: 122

Winner
No. 22	Joey Logano	Team Penske

Television in the United States
- Network: ESPN & MRN
- Announcers: Allen Bestwick, Dale Jarrett and Andy Petree (Television); Joe Moore and Jeff Striegle (Booth); Dave Moody (1 & 2) and Kyle Rickey (3 & 4) (Turns) (Radio)
- Nielsen ratings: 2.3/5 (Final); 2.1/5 (Overnight); 3.6 Million viewers

The 2014 Hollywood Casino 400 was a NASCAR Sprint Cup Series race that was held on October 5, 2014, at Kansas Speedway in Kansas City, Kansas. Contested over 267 laps on the 1.5–mile (2.4 km) oval, it was the 30th race of the 2014 Sprint Cup Series championship, and the fourth race in the Chase for the Sprint Cup. Joey Logano scored his fifth win of the season. Kyle Larson finished second while Kyle Busch, Martin Truex Jr. and Carl Edwards rounded out the top five. The top rookies of the race were Kyle Larson (2nd), Austin Dillon (8th), and Cole Whitt (23rd).

== Entry list ==
Forty-three drivers were entered for the race.

No.	Driver	Team	Manufacturer
1	Jamie McMurray	Chip Ganassi Racing	Chevrolet
2	Brad Keselowski (PC2) (CC)	Team Penske	Ford
3	Austin Dillon (R)	Richard Childress Racing	Chevrolet
4	Kevin Harvick (CC)	Stewart–Haas Racing	Chevrolet
5	Kasey Kahne (CC)	Hendrick Motorsports	Chevrolet
7	Michael Annett (R)	Tommy Baldwin Racing	Chevrolet
9	Marcos Ambrose	Richard Petty Motorsports	Ford
10	Danica Patrick	Stewart–Haas Racing	Chevrolet
11	Denny Hamlin (CC)	Joe Gibbs Racing	Toyota
13	Casey Mears	Germain Racing	Chevrolet
14	Tony Stewart (PC3)	Stewart–Haas Racing	Chevrolet
15	Clint Bowyer	Michael Waltrip Racing	Toyota
16	Greg Biffle	Roush Fenway Racing	Ford
17	Ricky Stenhouse Jr.	Roush Fenway Racing	Ford
18	Kyle Busch (CC)	Joe Gibbs Racing	Toyota
20	Matt Kenseth (PC5) (CC)	Joe Gibbs Racing	Toyota
22	Joey Logano (CC)	Team Penske	Ford
23	Alex Bowman (R)	BK Racing	Toyota
24	Jeff Gordon (PC6) (CC)	Hendrick Motorsports	Chevrolet
26	Cole Whitt (R)	BK Racing	Toyota
27	Paul Menard	Richard Childress Racing	Chevrolet
31	Ryan Newman (CC)	Richard Childress Racing	Chevrolet
32	Joey Gase (i)	Go FAS Racing	Ford
33	Timmy Hill	Hillman–Circle Sport	Chevrolet
34	David Ragan	Front Row Motorsports	Ford
36	Reed Sorenson	Tommy Baldwin Racing	Chevrolet
37	Mike Bliss (i)	Tommy Baldwin Racing	Chevrolet
38	David Gilliland	Front Row Motorsports	Ford
40	Landon Cassill (i)	Hillman–Circle Sport	Chevrolet
41	Kurt Busch (PC4)	Stewart–Haas Racing	Chevrolet
42	Kyle Larson (R)	Chip Ganassi Racing	Chevrolet
43	Aric Almirola	Richard Petty Motorsports	Ford
47	A. J. Allmendinger	JTG Daugherty Racing	Chevrolet
48	Jimmie Johnson (PC1) (CC)	Hendrick Motorsports	Chevrolet
51	Justin Allgaier (R)	HScott Motorsports	Chevrolet
55	Brian Vickers	Michael Waltrip Racing	Toyota
66	Mike Wallace (i)	Identity Ventures Racing	Toyota
78	Martin Truex Jr.	Furniture Row Racing	Chevrolet
83	J. J. Yeley	BK Racing	Toyota
88	Dale Earnhardt Jr. (CC)	Hendrick Motorsports	Chevrolet
95	Michael McDowell	Leavine Family Racing	Ford
98	Josh Wise	Phil Parsons Racing	Chevrolet
99	Carl Edwards (CC)	Roush Fenway Racing	Ford
Official entry list

Key	Meaning
(R)	Rookie
(i)	Ineligible for points
(PC#)	Past champions provisional
(CC)	Chase Contender

== Practice and qualifying ==
Jeff Gordon was the fastest in the first practice session with a time of 27.515 and a speed of 196.257 mph (315.845 km/h). Kevin Harvick won the pole with a time of 27.325 and a speed of 197.621 mph (318.040 km/h). “I’m just really proud of everybody on our Budweiser team,” said Harvick. “We’ve been dealt some bad luck throughout the year, but it hasn’t fazed them in continuing to work on the cars and the speed. The first three weeks we have led a bunch of laps and qualified well. Last week had them covered and a valve stem got knocked off by a lug nut. Keep doing the things that you are doing and that luck will all come full circle and as long as the cars continue to be fast that stuff all comes back to you. Hopefully it peaks at the right time.” "I'm pretty happy to be in the top five, that's better than where we started in May," said Gordon. “Sixth isn't bad; we were 17th in practice, but we have to keep working on it,” said Keselowski. “This is probably our weakest track in Chase." Marcos Ambrose was the fastest in the second practice session with a time of 28.176 and a speed of 191.652 mph (308.434 km/h). Kyle Larson was the fastest in the final practice session with a time of 28.377 and a speed of 190.295 mph (306.250 km/h). Kurt Busch spun his car exiting turn 4 and got stuck in the grass. He was forced to go to a backup car and will start last. Alex Bowman will also start last after tagging the wall in turn 4 and rolling out the backup car.

=== Qualifying Results ===
Pos	No.	Driver	Team	Manufacturer	R1	R2	R3
1	4	Kevin Harvick	Stewart–Haas Racing	Chevrolet	27.580	27.304	27.325
2	55	Brian Vickers	Michael Waltrip Racing	Toyota	27.720	27.616	27.508
3	43	Aric Almirola	Richard Petty Motorsports	Ford	27.670	27.581	27.530
4	22	Joey Logano	Team Penske	Ford	27.630	27.525	27.544
5	24	Jeff Gordon	Hendrick Motorsports	Chevrolet	27.660	27.557	27.544
6	2	Brad Keselowski	Team Penske	Ford	27.560	27.542	27.548
7	18	Kyle Busch	Joe Gibbs Racing	Toyota	27.870	27.544	27.555
8	88	Dale Earnhardt Jr.	Hendrick Motorsports	Chevrolet	27.660	27.615	27.593
9	14	Tony Stewart	Stewart–Haas Racing	Chevrolet	27.670	27.619	27.619
10	5	Kasey Kahne	Hendrick Motorsports	Chevrolet	27.750	27.638	27.641
11	16	Greg Biffle	Roush Fenway Racing	Ford	27.690	27.486	27.696
12	99	Carl Edwards	Roush Fenway Racing	Ford	27.600	27.623	27.732
13	27	Paul Menard	Richard Childress Racing	Chevrolet	27.800	27.654	—
14	1	Jamie McMurray	Chip Ganassi Racing	Chevrolet	27.790	27.669	—
15	78	Martin Truex Jr.	Furniture Row Racing	Chevrolet	27.790	27.681	—
16	3	Austin Dillon (R)	Richard Childress Racing	Chevrolet	27.780	27.684	—
17	31	Ryan Newman	Richard Childress Racing	Chevrolet	27.870	27.690	—
18	42	Kyle Larson (R)	Chip Ganassi Racing	Chevrolet	27.830	27.704	—
19	15	Clint Bowyer	Michael Waltrip Racing	Toyota	27.870	27.711	—
20	47	A. J. Allmendinger	JTG Daugherty Racing	Chevrolet	27.750	27.711	—
21	51	Justin Allgaier (R)	HScott Motorsports	Chevrolet	27.860	27.738	—
22	9	Marcos Ambrose	Richard Petty Motorsports	Ford	27.810	27.748	—
23	17	Ricky Stenhouse Jr.	Roush Fenway Racing	Ford	27.820	27.798	—
24	41	Kurt Busch (Note: Kurt Busch started from the rear after switching to a backup car post-qualifying.)	Stewart–Haas Racing	Chevrolet	27.870	27.873	—
25	11	Denny Hamlin	Joe Gibbs Racing	Toyota	27.873	—	—
26	13	Casey Mears	Germain Racing	Chevrolet	27.873	—	—
27	20	Matt Kenseth	Joe Gibbs Racing	Toyota	27.891	—	—
28	95	Michael McDowell	Leavine Family Racing	Ford	28.026	—	—
29	10	Danica Patrick	Stewart–Haas Racing	Chevrolet	28.111	—	—
30	36	Reed Sorenson	Tommy Baldwin Racing	Chevrolet	28.126	—	—
31	38	David Gilliland	Front Row Motorsports	Ford	28.243	—	—
32	48	Jimmie Johnson	Hendrick Motorsports	Chevrolet	28.254	—	—
33	23	Alex Bowman (R) (Note: Alex Bowman started from the rear after switching to a backup car post-qualifying.)	BK Racing	Toyota	28.274	—	—
34	98	Josh Wise	Phil Parsons Racing	Chevrolet	28.296	—	—
35	40	Landon Cassill	Hillman–Circle Sport	Chevrolet	28.302	—	—
36	7	Michael Annett (R)	Tommy Baldwin Racing	Chevrolet	28.313	—	—
37	34	David Ragan	Front Row Motorsports	Ford	28.325	—	—
38	83	J. J. Yeley	BK Racing	Toyota	28.436	—	—
39	26	Cole Whitt (R)	BK Racing	Toyota	28.584	—	—
40	33	Timmy Hill	Team XTREME Racing	Chevrolet	28.640	—	—
41	37	Mike Bliss	Tommy Baldwin Racing	Chevrolet	28.660	—	—
42	32	Joey Gase	Go FAS Racing	Ford	28.913	—	—
43	66	Mike Wallace	Identity Ventures Racing	Toyota	29.499	—	—

== Race ==
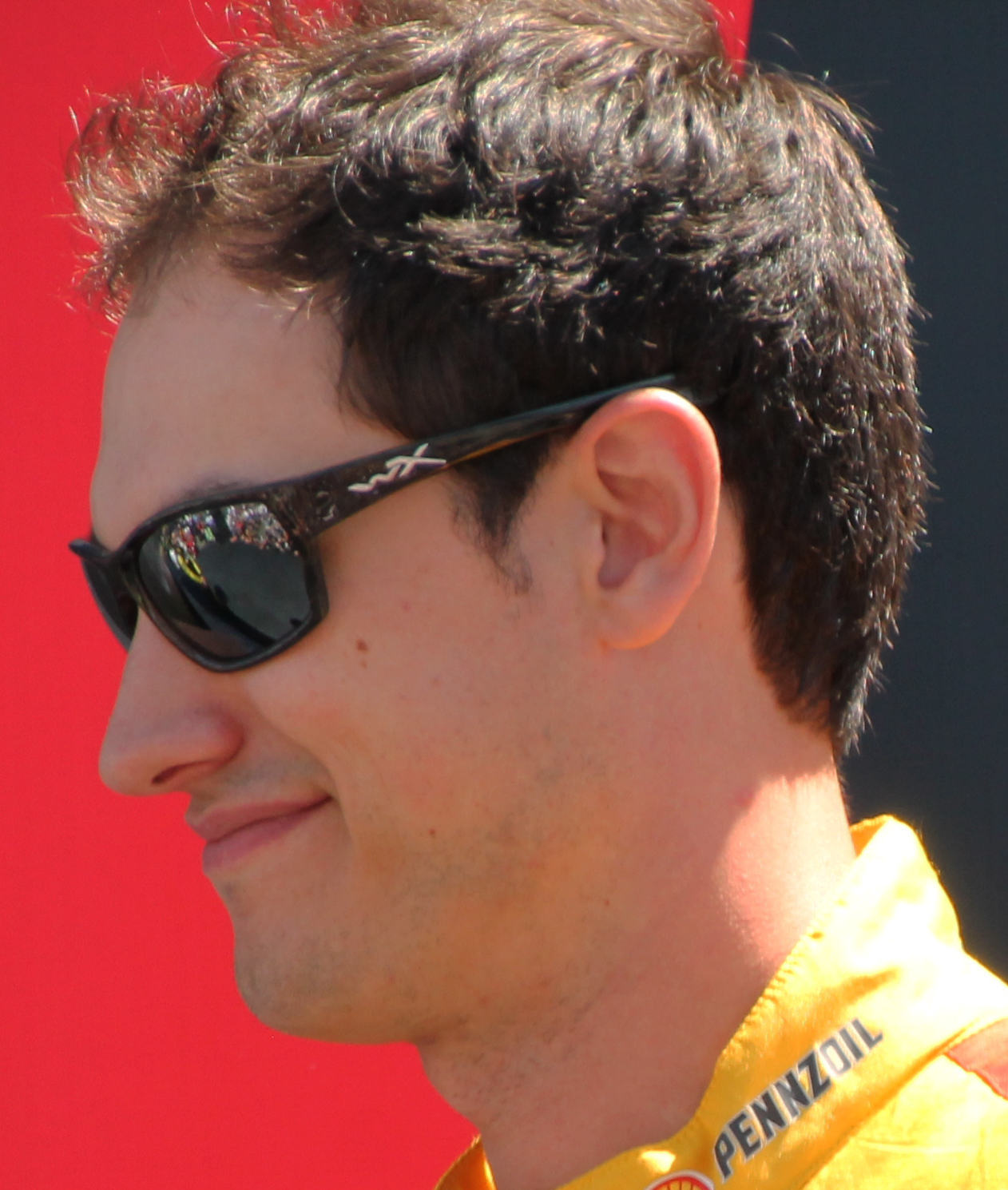
Joey Logano won the race.

The race was scheduled to begin at 2:16 PM Eastern time, but it started six minutes late when Kevin Harvick led the field to the green.

Jamie McMurray took the lead from Harvick on lap 44.

McMurray surrendered the lead on lap 47 to pit and handed the lead to Jeff Gordon.

Gordon surrendered the lead the next lap to pit. Brad Keselowski assumed the lead.

Keselowski pitted on lap 49 and McMurray cycled back to the lead on lap 50.

Caution flew for the first time on lap 71 for debris in turn 4. Jamie McMurray and Kevin Harvick traded the lead on pit road with the No.1 car pitting before the start/finish line. He took the lead back from Harvick.

The race restarted on lap 76. Greg Biffle about spun the car out exiting turn 2, but managed to save it. Dale Earnhardt Jr. took the lead.

Caution flew for the second time on lap 79 when Kurt Busch slammed the wall in turn 4.

The race restarted on lap 84. McMurray tapped the right rear corner panel of Jeff Gordon and he kissed the wall exiting turn 4.

A multi-car crash on the backstretch brought out the third caution of the race on lap 85. It started when Greg Biffle rear-ended Jimmie Johnson, who clipped Justin Allgaier in the process, and sent him into the inside wall. Allgaier continued down and collected Josh Wise. "Obviously a big hit in Chase points," Johnson said. "Puts a lot of pressure on us next week and the week after. We've got to be on our game at Charlotte and Talladega."

The race restarted on lap 91.

Dale Earnhardt Jr. was leading the race when the right-front tire blew and sent him into the wall exiting turn 4 bringing out the fourth caution of the race on lap 122. "The tire came apart going through the corner," said Earnhardt Jr., who was shooting for his third straight top 10 at Kansas. "We were running along there. I really wasn't pushing the car that hard and I had a real big lead so I was just backing the corner up and letting the car turn. Going into (Turn) 3 the tread of the tire came all the way off." Joey Logano took the lead as a result.

The race restarted on lap 128 and Kevin Harvick retook the lead.

Logano took the lead back from Harvick on lap 135.

Caution flew for the fifth time on lap 160 when Brad Keselowski blew a right-front and slammed the wall in turn 2. Kasey Kahne took just two tires and exited pit road first.

The race restarted on lap 165 and Kahne promptly lost the lead to Joey Logano.

Kevin Harvick retook the lead on lap 167 and Logano took it right back the next lap.

Caution flew for the sixth time on lap 190 after Joey Gase rear-ended the wall in turn 3. Harvick exited pit road as the leader.

The race restarted on lap 196.

Joey Logano retook the lead on lap 198.

Caution flew for the seventh time with 38 laps to go after Greg Biffle slammed the wall in turn 4. Ryan Newman took only two tires and won the race off pit road.

The race restarted with 33 laps to go.

The eighth caution flew with 32 laps to go after Kasey Kahne hit the wall in turn 2. "Something happened to my tire," Kahne said. "I was just about ready to crash and got it to pit road before it blew. Then we got back out and I lost the back of it and clipped the wall. We had a top three car before that. We really did."

The race restarted with 28 laps to go, Newman lost the lead to Joey Logano and he held off a hard-charging Kyle Larson to score his fifth win of the season. “It was a crazy race, and I had such a fast Pennzoil Ford," said Logano. It is awesome to be back in victory lane. When the top opened up, the car just took off. Me and the No. 42 (Kyle Larson) were the only ones that seemed to be able to run up there. We had a cat and mouse (with Larson) during portions of the late run. I just had to be able to work the traffic and keep my momentum up. We just have to keep capitalizing going forward.” “The easiest approach is to go to Charlotte and win,’’ Keselowski said. “The bad side of this Chase is we took a big points lead in here and gave it all back to zero. The good side of it is that you can still win your way out of it, and we have two really good tracks for us ahead. If we can just win at one of them, we will be fine. Maybe if we have two really good finishes we will be fine. That is the good side.”

=== Race results ===
Pos	No.	Driver	Team	Manufacturer	Laps	Points
1	22	Joey Logano	Team Penske	Ford	267	48
2	42	Kyle Larson (R)	Chip Ganassi Racing	Chevrolet	267	42
3	18	Kyle Busch	Joe Gibbs Racing	Toyota	267	42
4	78	Martin Truex Jr.	Furniture Row Racing	Chevrolet	267	40
5	99	Carl Edwards	Roush Fenway Racing	Ford	267	39
6	31	Ryan Newman	Richard Childress Racing	Chevrolet	267	39
7	11	Denny Hamlin	Joe Gibbs Racing	Toyota	267	37
8	3	Austin Dillon (R)	Richard Childress Racing	Chevrolet	267	36
9	27	Paul Menard	Richard Childress Racing	Chevrolet	267	35
10	55	Brian Vickers	Michael Waltrip Racing	Toyota	267	34
11	47	A. J. Allmendinger	JTG Daugherty Racing	Toyota	267	33
12	4	Kevin Harvick	Stewart–Haas Racing	Chevrolet	267	33
13	20	Matt Kenseth	Joe Gibbs Racing	Toyota	267	31
14	24	Jeff Gordon	Hendrick Motorsports	Chevrolet	267	31
15	16	Greg Biffle	Roush Fenway Racing	Ford	267	29
16	10	Danica Patrick	Stewart–Haas Racing	Chevrolet	267	28
17	14	Tony Stewart	Stewart–Haas Racing	Chevrolet	267	27
18	15	Clint Bowyer	Michael Waltrip Racing	Toyota	267	26
19	17	Ricky Stenhouse Jr.	Roush Fenway Racing	Ford	267	25
20	9	Marcos Ambrose	Richard Petty Motorsports	Ford	267	24
21	40	Landon Cassill	Hillman–Circle Sport	Chevrolet	267	0
22	5	Kasey Kahne	Hendrick Motorsports	Chevrolet	265	23
23	26	Cole Whitt (R)	BK Racing	Toyota	264	21
24	7	Michael Annett (R)	Tommy Baldwin Racing	Chevrolet	264	20
25	1	Jamie McMurray	Chip Ganassi Racing	Chevrolet	263	20
26	36	Reed Sorenson	Tommy Baldwin Racing	Chevrolet	263	18
27	34	David Ragan	Front Row Motorsports	Ford	262	17
28	13	Casey Mears	Germain Racing	Chevrolet	262	16
29	83	J. J. Yeley	BK Racing	Toyota	262	0
30	38	David Gilliland	Front Row Motorsports	Ford	262	14
31	43	Aric Almirola	Richard Petty Motorsports	Ford	260	13
32	23	Alex Bowman (R)	BK Racing	Toyota	259	12
33	33	Timmy Hill	Team XTREME Racing	Chevrolet	259	11
34	66	Mike Wallace	Identity Ventures Racing	Toyota	259	0
35	95	Michael McDowell	Leavine Family Racing	Ford	258	9
36	2	Brad Keselowski	Team Penske	Ford	222	9
37	32	Joey Gase	Go FAS Racing	Ford	213	0
38	98	Josh Wise	Phil Parsons Racing	Chevrolet	207	6
39	88	Dale Earnhardt Jr.	Hendrick Motorsports	Chevrolet	204	6
40	48	Jimmie Johnson	Hendrick Motorsports	Chevrolet	180	4
41	51	Justin Allgaier (R)	HScott Motorsports	Chevrolet	84	3
42	41	Kurt Busch	Stewart–Haas Racing	Chevrolet	75	2
43	37	Mike Bliss	Tommy Baldwin Racing	Chevrolet	17	0

=== Race statistics ===
- 25 lead changes among different drivers
- 8 cautions for 34 laps
- Time of race: 2 hours, 49 minutes and 17 seconds
- Average speed: 141.951 mph (228.448 km/h)
- Joey Logano won his fifth race in 2014

== Standings after the race ==
Drivers' Championship standings

	Pos	Driver	Points
1	1	Joey Logano	3,048
4	2	Kyle Busch	3,042 (-6)
7	3	Carl Edwards	3,039 (-9)
5	4	Ryan Newman	3,039 (-9)
6	5	Denny Hamlin	3,037 (-11)
3	6	Kevin Harvick	3,033 (-15)
1	7	Matt Kenseth	3,031 (-17)
3	8	Jeff Gordon	3,031 (-17)
3	9	Kasey Kahne	3,023 (-25)
9	10	Brad Keselowski	3,009 (-39)
4	11	Dale Earnhardt Jr.	3,006 (-42)
8	12	Jimmie Johnson	3,004 (-44)
	13	A. J. Allmendinger	2,110 (-938)
1	14	Greg Biffle	2,101 (-947)
1	15	Kurt Busch	2,075 (-973)
	16	Aric Almirola	2,074 (-974)

Manufacturers' Championship standings

Pos	Manufacturer	Points
1	Chevrolet	1,340
2	Ford	1,321 (-19)
3	Toyota	1,203 (-137)

- Note: Only the first sixteen positions are included for the driver standings.

== Note ==
Previous race: 2014 AAA 400	Sprint Cup Series; 2014 season	Next race: 2014 Bank of America 500
