= 2014 MyAFibStory.com 400 =

Race details
- Race 27 of 36 in the 2014 NASCAR Sprint Cup Series
- Date: September 14, 2014
- Location: Chicagoland Speedway; Joliet, Illinois
- Course: Permanent racing facility
- Course length: 1.5 miles (2.4 km)
- Distance: 267 laps, 400.5 mi (644.5 km)
- Weather: Sunny with a temperature of 63 °F (17 °C); wind out of the southwest at 6 miles per hour (9.7 km/h)
- Average speed: 142.330 mph (229.058 km/h)

Pole position
Driver	Kyle Busch	Joe Gibbs Racing
- Time: 28.207

Most laps led
Driver	Kevin Harvick	Stewart–Haas Racing
- Laps: 79

Winner
No. 2	Brad Keselowski	Team Penske

Television in the United States
- Network: ESPN & MRN
- Announcers: Allen Bestwick, Dale Jarrett and Andy Petree (Television); Joe Moore and Jeff Striegle (Booth); Dave Moody (1 & 2) and Mike Bagley (3 & 4) (Turns) (Radio)
- Nielsen ratings: 2.3/5 (Final); 2.1/5 (Overnight); 3.71 Million viewers

The 2014 MyAFibStory.com 400 was a NASCAR Sprint Cup Series stock car race that was held on September 14, 2014, at Chicagoland Speedway in Joliet, Illinois. The race was 267 laps long, and it was the 27th race of the 2014 NASCAR Sprint Cup Series, and the first of the ten-race Chase for the Sprint Cup. For the second race in a row, Brad Keselowski won the race to take his fifth win of the season and the 16th of his career. Jeff Gordon finished second ahead of rookie Kyle Larson. Joey Logano, and Kevin Harvick rounded out the top five.

== Report ==
=== Background ===
Chicagoland Speedway is a 1.5 miles (2.414 km) tri-oval speedway in Joliet, Illinois, southwest of Chicago. The speedway opened in 2001 and currently hosts NASCAR racing including the opening event in the Chase for the Sprint Cup. Until 2011, the speedway also hosted the Verizon IndyCar Series, recording numerous close finishes including the closest finish in IndyCar history. The speedway is owned and operated by International Speedway Corporation and located adjacent to Route 66 Raceway.

=== Entry list ===
The entry list for the MyAFibStory.com 400 was released on Monday, September 8, 2014 at 10:47 a.m. Eastern time. Forty-three drivers were entered for the race.

No.	Driver	Team	Manufacturer
1	Jamie McMurray	Chip Ganassi Racing	Chevrolet
2	Brad Keselowski (PC2) (CC)	Team Penske	Ford
3	Austin Dillon (R)	Richard Childress Racing	Chevrolet
4	Kevin Harvick (CC)	Stewart–Haas Racing	Chevrolet
5	Kasey Kahne (CC)	Hendrick Motorsports	Chevrolet
7	Michael Annett (R)	Tommy Baldwin Racing	Chevrolet
9	Marcos Ambrose	Richard Petty Motorsports	Ford
10	Danica Patrick	Stewart–Haas Racing	Chevrolet
11	Denny Hamlin (CC)	Joe Gibbs Racing	Toyota
13	Casey Mears	Germain Racing	Chevrolet
14	Tony Stewart (PC3)	Stewart–Haas Racing	Chevrolet
15	Clint Bowyer	Michael Waltrip Racing	Toyota
16	Greg Biffle (CC)	Roush Fenway Racing	Ford
17	Ricky Stenhouse Jr.	Roush Fenway Racing	Ford
18	Kyle Busch (CC)	Joe Gibbs Racing	Toyota
20	Matt Kenseth (PC5) (CC)	Joe Gibbs Racing	Toyota
22	Joey Logano (CC)	Team Penske	Ford
23	Alex Bowman (R)	BK Racing	Toyota
24	Jeff Gordon (PC6) (CC)	Hendrick Motorsports	Chevrolet
26	Cole Whitt (R)	BK Racing	Toyota
27	Paul Menard	Richard Childress Racing	Chevrolet
31	Ryan Newman (CC)	Richard Childress Racing	Chevrolet
32	Joey Gase (i)	Go FAS Racing	Ford
33	Travis Kvapil	Hillman–Circle Sport	Chevrolet
34	David Ragan	Front Row Motorsports	Ford
36	Reed Sorenson	Tommy Baldwin Racing	Chevrolet
37	Mike Bliss (i)	Tommy Baldwin Racing	Chevrolet
38	David Gilliland	Front Row Motorsports	Ford
40	Landon Cassill (i)	Hillman–Circle Sport	Chevrolet
41	Kurt Busch (PC4) (CC)	Stewart–Haas Racing	Chevrolet
42	Kyle Larson (R)	Chip Ganassi Racing	Chevrolet
43	Aric Almirola (CC)	Richard Petty Motorsports	Ford
47	A. J. Allmendinger (CC)	JTG Daugherty Racing	Chevrolet
48	Jimmie Johnson (PC1) (CC)	Hendrick Motorsports	Chevrolet
51	Justin Allgaier (R)	HScott Motorsports	Chevrolet
55	Brian Vickers	Michael Waltrip Racing	Toyota
66	Joe Nemechek (i)	Identity Ventures Racing	Toyota
78	Martin Truex Jr.	Furniture Row Racing	Chevrolet
83	Ryan Truex (R)	BK Racing	Toyota
88	Dale Earnhardt Jr. (CC)	Hendrick Motorsports	Chevrolet
95	Michael McDowell	Leavine Family Racing	Ford
98	Josh Wise	Phil Parsons Racing	Chevrolet
99	Carl Edwards (CC)	Roush Fenway Racing	Ford
Official entry list

Key	Meaning
(R)	Rookie
(i)	Ineligible for points
(PC#)	Past champions provisional
(CC)	Chase Contender

== Practice ==
=== First practice ===
Kyle Busch was the fastest in the first practice session with a time of 28.207 and a speed of 191.442 mph (308.096 km/h).

Pos	No.	Driver	Team	Manufacturer	Time	Speed
1	18	Kyle Busch	Joe Gibbs Racing	Toyota	28.207	191.442
2	31	Ryan Newman	Richard Childress Racing	Chevrolet	28.266	191.042
3	99	Carl Edwards	Roush Fenway Racing	Ford	28.269	191.022
Official first practice results

== Qualifying ==
Due to heavy rain, qualifying was cancelled and thus, Busch won the pole based on the session's times. He stated that the practice session had "started out slow, but the guys did a real nice job on the M&M's Camry today to get us to where we needed to be". Ryan Newman joined Busch on the front row, while in third place, was Carl Edwards – who missed the front row by 0.003 seconds. Although disappointed to miss the front row, Edwards expressed that he hoped "this is a sign of things to come".

=== Starting lineup ===
Pos	No.	Driver	Team	Manufacturer	Time
1	18	Kyle Busch	Joe Gibbs Racing	Toyota	28.207
2	31	Ryan Newman	Richard Childress Racing	Chevrolet	28.266
3	99	Carl Edwards	Roush Fenway Racing	Ford	28.269
4	17	Ricky Stenhouse Jr.	Roush Fenway Racing	Ford	28.272
5	20	Matt Kenseth	Joe Gibbs Racing	Toyota	28.287
6	15	Clint Bowyer	Michael Waltrip Racing	Toyota	28.290
7	48	Jimmie Johnson	Hendrick Motorsports	Chevrolet	28.300
8	24	Jeff Gordon	Hendrick Motorsports	Chevrolet	28.309
9	27	Paul Menard	Richard Childress Racing	Chevrolet	28.321
10	42	Kyle Larson (R) (Note: Kyle Larson started at the rear of the field, after crashing his primary car during the second practice session.)	Chip Ganassi Racing	Chevrolet	28.331
11	1	Jamie McMurray	Chip Ganassi Racing	Chevrolet	28.331
12	4	Kevin Harvick	Stewart–Haas Racing	Chevrolet	28.334
13	88	Dale Earnhardt Jr.	Hendrick Motorsports	Chevrolet	28.336
14	41	Kurt Busch	Stewart–Haas Racing	Chevrolet	28.353
15	55	Brian Vickers	Michael Waltrip Racing	Toyota	28.372
16	3	Austin Dillon (R)	Richard Childress Racing	Chevrolet	28.372
17	47	A. J. Allmendinger	JTG Daugherty Racing	Chevrolet	28.408
18	10	Danica Patrick	Stewart–Haas Racing	Chevrolet	28.435
19	5	Kasey Kahne	Hendrick Motorsports	Chevrolet	28.459
20	16	Greg Biffle	Roush Fenway Racing	Ford	28.475
21	9	Marcos Ambrose	Richard Petty Motorsports	Ford	28.499
22	14	Tony Stewart	Stewart–Haas Racing	Chevrolet	28.505
23	43	Aric Almirola	Richard Petty Motorsports	Ford	28.518
24	11	Denny Hamlin	Joe Gibbs Racing	Toyota	28.530
25	2	Brad Keselowski	Team Penske	Ford	28.548
26	51	Justin Allgaier (R)	HScott Motorsports	Chevrolet	28.580
27	78	Martin Truex Jr.	Furniture Row Racing	Chevrolet	28.586
28	22	Joey Logano	Team Penske	Ford	28.599
29	13	Casey Mears	Germain Racing	Chevrolet	28.659
30	38	David Gilliland	Front Row Motorsports	Ford	28.778
31	83	Ryan Truex (R)	BK Racing	Toyota	28.962
32	95	Michael McDowell	Leavine Family Racing	Ford	29.001
33	26	Cole Whitt (R)	BK Racing	Toyota	29.044
34	98	Josh Wise	Phil Parsons Racing	Chevrolet	29.072
35	36	Reed Sorenson	Tommy Baldwin Racing	Chevrolet	29.154
36	7	Michael Annett (R)	Tommy Baldwin Racing	Chevrolet	29.154
37	23	Alex Bowman (R)	BK Racing	Toyota	29.180
38	40	Landon Cassill	Hillman–Circle Sport	Chevrolet	29.192
39	34	David Ragan	Front Row Motorsports	Ford	29.200
40	37	Mike Bliss	Hillman–Circle Sport	Chevrolet	29.225
41	66	Joe Nemechek	Identity Ventures Racing	Toyota	29.637
42	33	Travis Kvapil	Hillman–Circle Sport	Chevrolet	29.726
43	32	Joey Gase	Go FAS Racing	Ford	30.516
Official starting lineup

== Practice (post-qualifying) ==
=== Second practice ===
Paul Menard was the fastest in the second practice session with a time of 28.606 and a speed of 188.772 mph (303.799 km/h). Kyle Larson was forced to go to a backup car after his primary car cut a left-front tire and hit the wall in turn two. As this change occurred after qualifying, it meant that Larson had to start the race from the rear of the field.

Pos	No.	Driver	Team	Manufacturer	Time	Speed
1	27	Paul Menard	Richard Childress Racing	Chevrolet	28.606	188.772
2	5	Kasey Kahne	Hendrick Motorsports	Chevrolet	28.757	187.780
3	4	Kevin Harvick	Stewart–Haas Racing	Chevrolet	28.768	187.709
Official second practice results

=== Final practice ===
Carl Edwards was the fastest in the final practice session with a time of 28.968 and a speed of 186.413 mph (300.003 km/h).

Pos	No.	Driver	Team	Manufacturer	Time	Speed
1	99	Carl Edwards	Richard Childress Racing	Ford	28.968	186.413
2	2	Brad Keselowski	Team Penske	Ford	28.980	186.335
3	42	Kyle Larson (R)	Chip Ganassi Racing	Chevrolet	29.045	185.918
Official final practice results

== Race ==
=== First half ===
==== Start ====
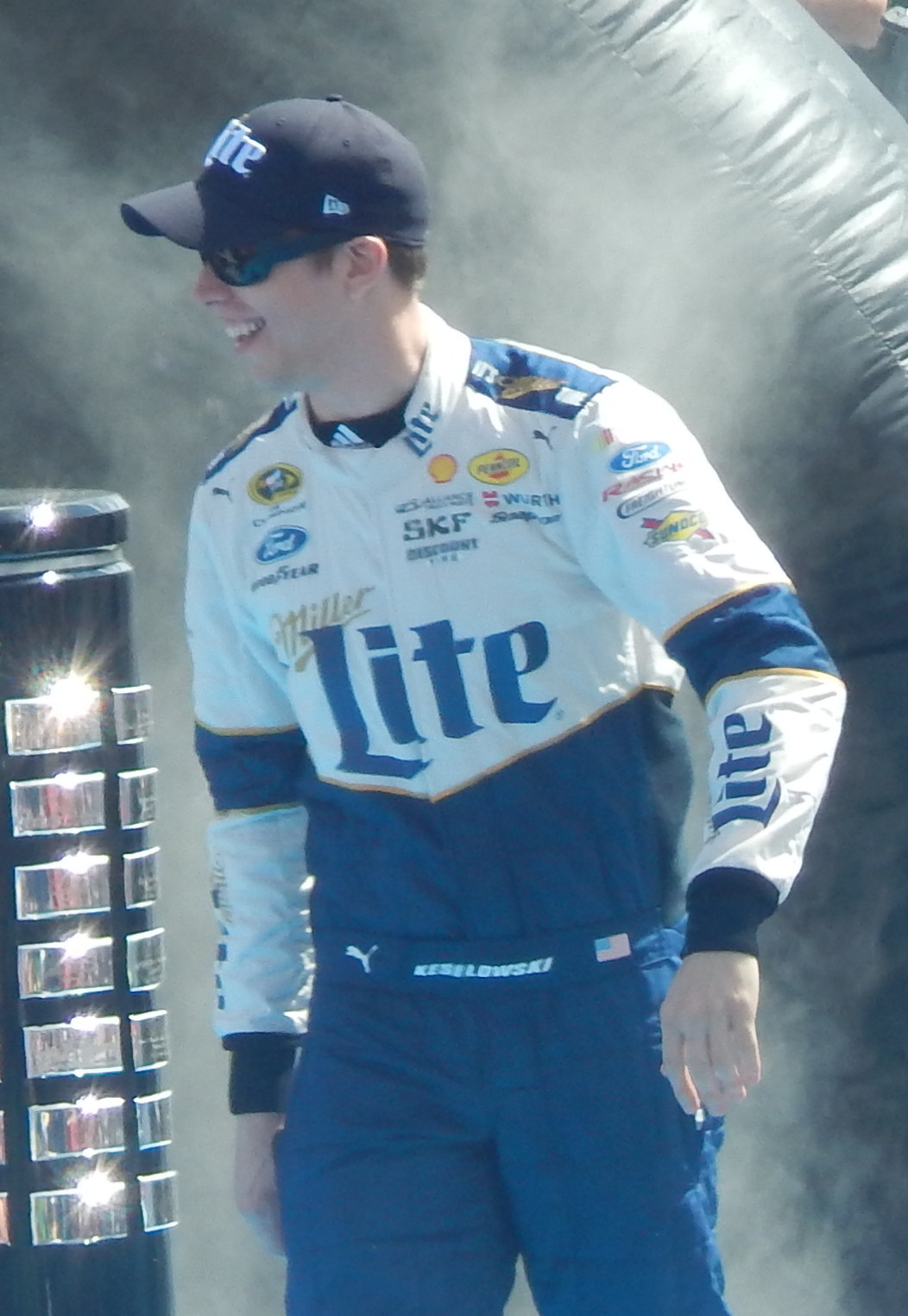
Brad Keselowski won the race.

The race was scheduled to start at 2:16 p.m. Eastern time but started five minutes later when Kyle Busch led the field to the green. Busch held the lead for the first portion of the race, until Jeff Gordon took the lead on lap 29. Jamie McMurray took the lead from Gordon on lap 40, and held the lead until the first set of green flag pit stops during the race, when he ceded the lead to Brad Keselowski, on lap 46. Keselowski's stay out front was short-lived, as he pitted on lap 47, and the lead cycled back to McMurray. The first caution of the race came out at around quarter-distance, caused by debris in turn two. Kyle Busch won the race off pit road, and thus retook the lead from McMurray, for the restart on lap 73. Three laps after the restart, McMurray scraped the wall upon exiting turn 2, but was able to maintain position despite that.

Gordon retook the lead from Busch on lap 88, and held the lead until the race went under neutralized yellow flag conditions for the second time, on lap 99, after Ryan Newman's car cut a left-front tire, exiting turn 4. The layout of the Chicagoland Speedway meant that Newman was unable to hit pit road instantaneously after the blowout, necessitating the yellow flag. Prior to the yellow flag, Justin Allgaier also hit the wall, but was able to continue. McMurray led the field out of the pits, after he took only two tires at his pit stop. Under caution, the shifter handle on the No. 47 car of A. J. Allmendinger broke, akin to what happened to Jimmie Johnson at the Pure Michigan 400 the previous month. McMurray led to the restart on lap 105, but Keselowski retook the lead on lap 107.

=== Second half ===
Keselowski held the lead throughout the next stint, and only gave up the lead, to make a scheduled green flag pit stop, on lap 149. This gave the head of the race to Jimmie Johnson, but Johnson pitted the next lap to give the lead back to Keselowski. However, Kevin Harvick drove past Keselowski almost immediately thereafter, to take the lead for the first time in the race. Harvick held the lead until the next caution, the race's third, on lap 181. The caution came after a piece of energy absorbing foam from the SAFER barrier protection blocks had broken free. Keselowski came off pit road in second place behind Harvick, but had to make another stop for a missing lug nut, prior to the lap 187 restart. Kyle Larson took the lead from Harvick with 40 laps to go, before pitting a lap later, and passed the lead onto Aric Almirola.

==== Final laps ====
Almirola made his final stop as the caution came out with 37 laps to go after Carl Edwards' car cut down a left-rear tire, and Larson cycled back to the lead in the process. While pitting, Almirola blew his car's engine, and he retired from the race. Almirola later described himself as "heartbroken" with the result. The race restarted with 30 laps to go, but only ran for a handful of laps before Clint Bowyer brought out the fifth caution of the race, with 23 laps to go, after he hit the wall in turn 2. The race restarted with 18 laps to go, and Harvick retook the lead from Larson before Keselowski moved to the head of the race the following lap. The caution flags flew for the sixth time with ten laps to go after Ricky Stenhouse Jr. and Danica Patrick made contact on the front stretch. Upon exiting her car, Patrick stated that she "talked with Ricky afterward and we're fine". The race restarted with six laps to go and Brad Keselowski coasted on to victory lane, for his second successive win. Keselowski expressed his delight at the result, stating that he "was waiting for an opportunity to strike and it came. The car stuck and everything came together".

=== Race results ===
Pos	No.	Driver	Team	Manufacturer	Laps	Points
1	2	Brad Keselowski	Team Penske	Ford	267	47
2	24	Jeff Gordon	Hendrick Motorsports	Chevrolet	267	43
3	42	Kyle Larson (R)	Chip Ganassi Racing	Chevrolet	267	42
4	22	Joey Logano	Team Penske	Ford	267	40
5	4	Kevin Harvick	Stewart–Haas Racing	Chevrolet	267	41
6	11	Denny Hamlin	Joe Gibbs Racing	Toyota	267	38
7	18	Kyle Busch	Joe Gibbs Racing	Toyota	267	38
8	41	Kurt Busch	Stewart–Haas Racing	Chevrolet	267	36
9	1	Jamie McMurray	Chip Ganassi Racing	Chevrolet	267	36
10	20	Matt Kenseth	Joe Gibbs Racing	Toyota	267	34
11	88	Dale Earnhardt Jr.	Hendrick Motorsports	Chevrolet	267	33
12	48	Jimmie Johnson	Hendrick Motorsports	Chevrolet	267	32
13	5	Kasey Kahne	Hendrick Motorsports	Chevrolet	267	31
14	78	Martin Truex Jr.	Furniture Row Racing	Chevrolet	267	30
15	31	Ryan Newman	Richard Childress Racing	Chevrolet	267	29
16	3	Austin Dillon (R)	Richard Childress Racing	Chevrolet	267	28
17	17	Ricky Stenhouse Jr.	Roush Fenway Racing	Ford	267	27
18	14	Tony Stewart	Stewart–Haas Racing	Chevrolet	267	26
19	10	Danica Patrick	Stewart–Haas Racing	Chevrolet	267	25
20	99	Carl Edwards	Roush Fenway Racing	Ford	266	24
21	27	Paul Menard	Richard Childress Racing	Chevrolet	266	23
22	47	A. J. Allmendinger	JTG Daugherty Racing	Chevrolet	265	22
23	16	Greg Biffle	Roush Fenway Racing	Ford	265	21
24	55	Brian Vickers	Michael Waltrip Racing	Toyota	265	20
25	9	Marcos Ambrose	Richard Petty Motorsports	Ford	265	19
26	13	Casey Mears	Germain Racing	Chevrolet	264	18
27	51	Justin Allgaier (R)	HScott Motorsports	Chevrolet	264	17
28	40	Landon Cassill	Hillman–Circle Sport	Chevrolet	263	0
29	36	Reed Sorenson	Tommy Baldwin Racing	Chevrolet	262	15
30	26	Cole Whitt (R)	BK Racing	Toyota	262	14
31	34	David Ragan	Front Row Motorsports	Ford	262	13
32	95	Michael McDowell	Leavine Family Racing	Ford	262	12
33	98	Josh Wise	Phil Parsons Racing	Chevrolet	262	11
34	38	David Gilliland	Front Row Motorsports	Ford	261	10
35	23	Alex Bowman (R)	BK Racing	Toyota	261	9
36	66	Joe Nemechek	Identity Ventures Racing	Toyota	258	0
37	32	Joey Gase	Go FAS Racing	Ford	257	0
38	33	Travis Kvapil	Hillman–Circle Sport	Chevrolet	256	6
39	15	Clint Bowyer	Michael Waltrip Racing	Toyota	244	5
40	7	Michael Annett (R)	Tommy Baldwin Racing	Chevrolet	233	4
41	43	Aric Almirola	Richard Petty Motorsports	Ford	230	4
42	83	Ryan Truex (R)	BK Racing	Toyota	184	2
43	37	Mike Bliss	Hillman–Circle Sport	Chevrolet	13	0

=== Race statistics ===
- 18 lead changes among different drivers
- 6 cautions for 28 laps
- Time of race: 2:48:50
- Brad Keselowski won his fifth race in 2014

== Media ==
=== Television ===
ESPN
Booth announcers	Pit reporters
Lap-by-lap: Allen Bestwick; Color-commentator: Dale Jarrett; Color commentator: Andy Petree	Jerry Punch; Dave Burns; Vince Welch; Jamie Little

=== Radio ===
MRN Radio
Booth announcers	Turn announcers	Pit reporters
Lead announcer: Joe Moore; Announcer: Jeff Striegle	Turns 1 & 2: Dave Moody; Turns 3 & 4: Mike Bagley	Winston Kelly; Steve Post; Alex Hayden; Pete Pistone

== Standings after the race ==
Drivers' Championship standings

	Pos	Driver	Points
	1	Brad Keselowski	2,059
	2	Jeff Gordon	2,052 (−7)
2	3	Joey Logano	2,049 (−10)
2	4	Kevin Harvick	2,047 (−12)
2	5	Dale Earnhardt Jr.	2,042 (−17)
3	6	Denny Hamlin	2,041 (−18)
1	7	Kyle Busch	2,041 (−18)
4	8	Jimmie Johnson	2,041 (−18)
1	9	Kurt Busch	2,039 (−20)
4	10	Matt Kenseth	2,034 (−25)
	11	Kasey Kahne	2,034 (−25)
5	12	Carl Edwards	2,030 (−29)
3	13	Ryan Newman	2,029 (−30)
1	14	A. J. Allmendinger	2,025 (−34)
	15	Greg Biffle	2,021 (−38)
4	16	Aric Almirola	2,007 (−52)

Manufacturers' Championship standings

Pos	Manufacturer	Points
1	Chevrolet	1,209
2	Ford	1,183 (−26)
3	Toyota	1,085 (−124)

- Note: Only the first sixteen positions are included for the driver standings.

== Note ==
Previous race: 2014 Federated Auto Parts 400	Sprint Cup Series; 2014 season	Next race: 2014 Sylvania 300
