= 2014 Daytona 500 =

Auto race held in 2014

Race details
- Race 1 of 36 in the 2014 NASCAR Sprint Cup Series
- Date: February 23, 2014
- Location: Daytona International Speedway; Daytona Beach, Florida, U.S.
- Course: Permanent racing facility 2.5 mi (4.023 km)
- Distance: 200 laps, 500 mi (804.672 km)
- Weather: Cloudy, scattered showers/thunderstorms
- Average speed: 145.29 mph (233.82 km/h)

Pole position
Driver	Austin Dillon (R)	Richard Childress Racing
- Time: 46.426 seconds

Qualifying race winners
Duel 1 Winner	Matt Kenseth	Joe Gibbs Racing
Duel 2 Winner	Denny Hamlin	Joe Gibbs Racing

Most laps led
Driver	Dale Earnhardt Jr.	Hendrick Motorsports
- Laps: 54

Winner
No. 88	Dale Earnhardt Jr.	Hendrick Motorsports

Television in the United States
- Network: Fox & MRN
- Announcers: Mike Joy, Darrell Waltrip and Larry McReynolds (Television); Joe Moore and Barney Hall (Booth); Dave Moody (1 & 2), Mike Bagley (Backstretch) and Jeff Striegle (3 & 4) (Radio)
- Nielsen ratings: 5.6/10 (Finals); 5.3/10 (Overnights); 9.3 Million Viewers

The 2014 Daytona 500, the 56th running of the event, was held on February 23, 2014 at Daytona International Speedway in Daytona Beach, Florida. Contested over 200 laps and 500 miles (800 km) on the 2.5 miles (4.0 km) asphalt tri-oval, it was the first race of the 2014 NASCAR Sprint Cup season. Dale Earnhardt Jr., driving for Hendrick Motorsports, won the race, making this his second Daytona 500 victory breaking a 55-race winless streak. Denny Hamlin finished 2nd, while Brad Keselowski, Jeff Gordon, and Jimmie Johnson rounded out the Top 5. This race had seven cautions and 42 lead changes among 18 different drivers. The top rookies of this race were polesitter Austin Dillon (9th), Alex Bowman (23rd), and Brian Scott (25th).

== Background ==
Daytona International Speedway, where the race was held. The front stretch is at the bottom of the figure.

Daytona International Speedway is one of six superspeedways to hold NASCAR races, the others being Michigan International Speedway, Auto Club Speedway, Indianapolis Motor Speedway, Pocono Raceway, and Talladega Superspeedway. The standard track at Daytona International Speedway is a four-turn superspeedway that is 2.5 miles (4.0 km) long. The track's turns are banked at 31 degrees, while the front stretch, the location of the finish line, is banked at 18 degrees. Jimmie Johnson was the defending race winner.

In addition to NASCAR, the track also hosts races of ARCA, AMA Superbike, USCC, SCCA, and Motocross. The track features multiple layouts including the primary 2.5 miles (4.0 km) high speed tri-oval, a 3.56 miles (5.73 km) sports car course, a 2.95 miles (4.75 km) motorcycle course, and a .25 miles (0.40 km) karting and motorcycle flat-track. The track's 180-acre (73 ha) infield includes the 29-acre (12 ha) Lake Lloyd, which has hosted powerboat racing. The speedway is owned and operated by International Speedway Corporation.

The track was built to host racing that was being held by NASCAR founder Bill France Sr. at the former Daytona Beach Road Course and opened with the first Daytona 500 in 1959. The speedway has been renovated three times, with the infield renovated in 2004, and the track repaved in 1978 and 2010.

The program for the 2014 Daytona 500, showing iconic wins, including Trevor Bayne's win in 2011, Dale Earnhardt's in 1998, and Jimmie Johnson's in 2013.

This was the 56th running of the Daytona 500, the most prestigious race in all of NASCAR. This race also saw the Sprint Cup Series debut of five drivers of the eight in the 2014 rookie class. It also marked Terry Labonte's 32nd and final start in the Daytona 500. His 32 starts in the race are second all-time to Dave Marcis and his 33 starts. This edition of the race turned out to be Marcos Ambrose’s final start in the Daytona 500.

=== Entry list ===
The entry list for the 2014 Daytona 500 was released on Friday, February 14, 2014 at 1:45 p.m. Eastern time. Forty-nine drivers were entered to qualify for the race.

No.	Driver	Team	Manufacturer
1	Jamie McMurray (W)	Chip Ganassi Racing	Chevrolet
2	Brad Keselowski	Team Penske	Ford
3	Austin Dillon (R)	Richard Childress Racing	Chevrolet
4	Kevin Harvick (W)	Stewart–Haas Racing	Chevrolet
5	Kasey Kahne	Hendrick Motorsports	Chevrolet
7	Michael Annett	Tommy Baldwin Racing	Chevrolet
9	Marcos Ambrose	Richard Petty Motorsports	Ford
10	Danica Patrick	Stewart–Haas Racing	Chevrolet
11	Denny Hamlin	Joe Gibbs Racing	Toyota
13	Casey Mears	Germain Racing	Chevrolet
14	Tony Stewart	Stewart–Haas Racing	Chevrolet
15	Clint Bowyer	Michael Waltrip Racing	Toyota
16	Greg Biffle	Roush-Fenway Racing	Ford
17	Ricky Stenhouse Jr.	Roush-Fenway Racing	Ford
18	Kyle Busch	Joe Gibbs Racing	Toyota
20	Matt Kenseth (W)	Joe Gibbs Racing	Ford
21	Trevor Bayne (W)	Wood Brothers Racing	Ford
22	Joey Logano	Team Penske	Ford
23	Alex Bowman (R)	BK Racing	Toyota
24	Jeff Gordon (W)	Hendrick Motorsports	Chevrolet
26	Cole Whitt (R)	Swan Racing	Toyota
27	Paul Menard	Richard Childress Racing	Chevrolet
30	Parker Kligerman (R)	Swan Racing	Toyota
31	Ryan Newman (W)	Richard Childress Racing	Chevrolet
32	Terry Labonte	Go FAS Racing	Ford
33	Brian Scott	Richard Childress Racing	Chevrolet
34	David Ragan	Front Row Motorsports	Ford
35	Eric McClure	Front Row Motorsports	Ford
36	Reed Sorenson	Tommy Baldwin Racing	Chevrolet
38	David Gilliland	Front Row Motorsports	Ford
40	Landon Cassill	Circle Sport	Chevrolet
41	Kurt Busch	Stewart–Haas Racing	Chevrolet
42	Kyle Larson (R)	Chip Ganassi Racing	Chevrolet
43	Aric Almirola	Richard Petty Motorsports	Ford
47	A. J. Allmendinger	JTG Daugherty Racing	Chevrolet
48	Jimmie Johnson (W)	Hendrick Motorsports	Chevrolet
51	Justin Allgaier (R)	HScott Motorsports	Chevrolet
52	Bobby Labonte	HScott Motorsports	Chevrolet
55	Brian Vickers	Michael Waltrip Racing	Toyota
66	Michael Waltrip (W)	Michael Waltrip Racing	Toyota
77	Dave Blaney	Randy Humphrey Racing	Ford
78	Martin Truex Jr.	Furniture Row Racing	Chevrolet
83	Ryan Truex (R)	BK Racing	Toyota
87	Joe Nemechek	NEMCO Motorsports	Toyota
88	Dale Earnhardt Jr. (W)	Hendrick Motorsports	Chevrolet
93	Morgan Shepherd	BK Racing	Toyota
95	Michael McDowell	Leavine Family Racing	Ford
98	Josh Wise	Phil Parsons Racing	Ford
99	Carl Edwards	Roush-Fenway Racing	Ford
Official Entry List

Key	Meaning
(R)	Rookie
(W)	Past winner

== Practice ==
=== First practice February 15 ===
Paul Menard was the fastest in the first practice session on February 15 with a time of 46.144 and a speed of 195.042 mph (313.890 km/h).

	No.	Driver	Team	Manufacturer	Time	Speed
1	27	Paul Menard	Richard Childress Racing	Chevrolet	46.144	195.042
2	31	Ryan Newman (W)	Richard Childress Racing	Chevrolet	46.192	194.839
3	20	Matt Kenseth (W)	Joe Gibbs Racing	Toyota	46.258	194.561
Official first practice results

=== Second practice February 15 ===
Ryan Newman was the fastest in the second practice session later that day with a time of 46.072 and a speed of 195.346 mph (314.379 km/h).

	No.	Driver	Team	Manufacturer	Time	Speed
1	31	Ryan Newman (W)	Richard Childress Racing	Chevrolet	46.072	195.346
2	3	Austin Dillon (R)	Richard Childress Racing	Chevrolet	46.104	195.211
3	42	Kyle Larson (R)	Chip Ganassi Racing	Chevrolet	46.217	194.734
Official second practice results

== Qualifying ==
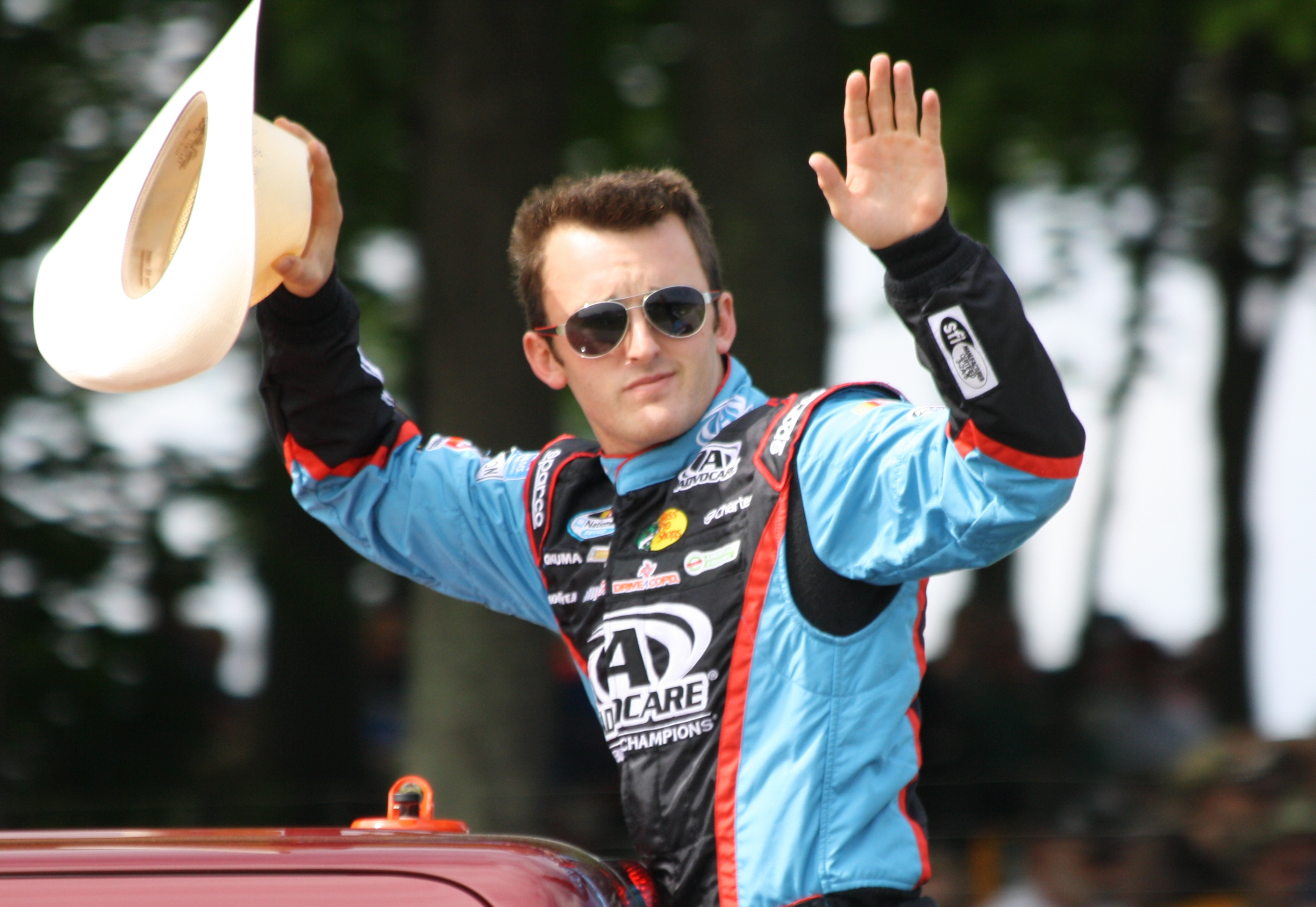
Austin Dillon won the pole position in the No. 3's first Cup Series race since 2001.

Rookie Austin Dillon won the pole position with a lap time of 45.914 and a speed of 196.019 mph (315.462 km/h), while Martin Truex Jr. was second. "This is awesome," Dillon said. "It is all for our guys, and this guy right here Danny Lawrence, (head engine builder at RCR), it is his birthday. So we got him a one-two start at Daytona! That is pretty awesome." "It's a tremendous amount of motivation for us and momentum for us," said Gil Martin, Dillon's crew chief. "I mean, because every day you drive onto our complex, you see Richard's '3' and you see the heritage of that 3 there, so to be able to be a part of this, it's a dream come true for me, and I know it is for everybody in our whole team and our whole organization because I've watched Austin come from being a little guy to where he's at today, and it's been an amazing journey to watch. And to be a part of it now, I'm looking forward to it. I think it's going to be a great run."

=== Qualifying results ===
Pos	No.	Driver	Team	Manufacturer	Time	Speed
1	3	Austin Dillon	Richard Childress Racing	Chevrolet	45.914	196.019
2	78	Martin Truex Jr.	Furniture Row Racing	Chevrolet	45.953	195.852
3	16	Greg Biffle	Roush Fenway Racing	Ford	45.961	195.818
4	99	Carl Edwards	Roush Fenway Racing	Ford	45.986	195.712
5	31	Ryan Newman (W)	Richard Childress Racing	Chevrolet	45.987	195.707
6	2	Brad Keselowski	Team Penske	Ford	46.084	195.296
7	88	Dale Earnhardt Jr. (W)	Hendrick Motorsports	Chevrolet	46.104	195.211
8	24	Jeff Gordon (W)	Hendrick Motorsports	Chevrolet	46.144	195.042
9	17	Ricky Stenhouse Jr.	Roush Fenway Racing	Ford	46.153	195.004
10	27	Paul Menard	Richard Childress Racing	Chevrolet	46.173	194.919
11	9	Marcos Ambrose	Richard Petty Motorsports	Ford	46.179	194.894
12	33	Brian Scott (R)	Richard Childress Racing	Chevrolet	46.207	194.776
13	43	Aric Almirola	Richard Petty Motorsports	Ford	46.235	194.658
14	48	Jimmie Johnson (W)	Hendrick Motorsports	Chevrolet	46.240	194.637
15	22	Joey Logano	Team Penske	Ford	46.253	194.582
16	13	Casey Mears	Germain Racing	Chevrolet	46.253	194.582
17	20	Matt Kenseth (W)	Joe Gibbs Racing	Toyota	46.255	194.574
18	7	Michael Annett (R)	Tommy Baldwin Racing	Chevrolet	46.255	194.574
19	5	Kasey Kahne	Hendrick Motorsports	Chevrolet	46.262	194.544
20	15	Clint Bowyer	Michael Waltrip Racing	Toyota	46.267	194.523
21	18	Kyle Busch	Joe Gibbs Racing	Toyota	46.272	194.502
22	11	Denny Hamlin	Joe Gibbs Racing	Toyota	46.278	194.477
23	4	Kevin Harvick (W)	Stewart–Haas Racing	Chevrolet	46.291	194.422
24	42	Kyle Larson (R)	Chip Ganassi Racing	Chevrolet	46.294	194.410
25	10	Danica Patrick	Stewart–Haas Racing	Chevrolet	46.301	194.380
26	21	Trevor Bayne (W)	Wood Brothers Racing	Ford	46.312	194.334
27	47	A. J. Allmendinger	JTG Daugherty Racing	Chevrolet	46.366	194.108
28	41	Kurt Busch	Stewart–Haas Racing	Chevrolet	46.373	194.078
29	36	Reed Sorenson	Tommy Baldwin Racing	Chevrolet	46.376	194.066
30	51	Justin Allgaier (R)	HScott Motorsports	Chevrolet	46.436	193.815
31	38	David Gilliland	Front Row Motorsports	Ford	46.455	193.736
32	40	Landon Cassill	Hillman Racing	Chevrolet	46.456	193.732
33	30	Parker Kligerman (R)	Swan Racing	Toyota	46.489	193.594
34	66	Michael Waltrip (W)	Identity Ventures Racing	Toyota	46.529	193.428
35	14	Tony Stewart	Stewart–Haas Racing	Chevrolet	46.544	193.365
36	35	Eric McClure (R)	Front Row Motorsports	Ford	46.655	192.905
37	55	Brian Vickers	Michael Waltrip Racing	Toyota	46.681	192.798
38	1	Jamie McMurray (W)	Chip Ganassi Racing	Chevrolet	46.706	192.695
39	26	Cole Whitt (R)	Swan Racing	Toyota	46.744	192.538
40	34	David Ragan	Front Row Motorsports	Ford	46.795	192.328
41	95	Michael McDowell	Leavine Family Racing	Ford	46.804	192.291
42	32	Terry Labonte	Go FAS Racing	Ford	46.842	192.135
43	98	Josh Wise	Phil Parsons Racing	Ford	46.860	192.061
44	52	Bobby Labonte	HScott Motorsports	Chevrolet	46.999	191.493
45	87	Joe Nemechek	Identity Ventures Racing	Toyota	47.249	190.480
46	83	Ryan Truex (R)	BK Racing	Toyota	47.282	190.347
47	23	Alex Bowman (R)	BK Racing	Toyota	47.447	189.685
48	93	Morgan Shepherd	BK Racing	Toyota	47.483	189.542
49	77	Dave Blaney	Randy Humphrey Racing	Ford	No time	No speed
Official qualifying results

== Practice (post-qualifying) ==
=== Third practice February 19 ===
A. J. Allmendinger was the fastest in the third practice session on February 19 with a time of 45.096 and a speed of 199.574 mph (321.183 km/h). During the session, Joey Logano and Matt Kenseth made contact, which sent rookie Parker Kligerman into the catchfence and caused his car to land on its roof. As a result, Logano, Kligerman, Menard and Ryan Truex had to switch to backup cars for the Budweiser Duels. Dave Blaney withdrew from the race after his team was unable to secure another car.

Kligerman stated that it was the first flip of his career, and that he "assumed it would be rougher. It was pretty soft. I was up in the fence floating along. Then it just slid over softly". Logano stated that Kenseth had "started making a move to go down" and that he "was making the run, and I was going to fill that hole. He started to come back up and I was there".

	No.	Driver	Team	Manufacturer	Time	Speed
1	47	A. J. Allmendinger	JTG Daugherty Racing	Chevrolet	45.096	199.574
2	55	Brian Vickers	Michael Waltrip Racing	Toyota	45.152	199.327
3	22	Joey Logano	Team Penske	Ford	45.350	198.456
Official third practice results

== Budweiser Duels ==
=== Race One ===
Austin Dillon led the field to the green flag at 7:16 p.m., and after leading the first 14 laps, Dillon lost the lead to Dale Earnhardt Jr. on lap 15. Matt Kenseth took the lead on lap 29, and held the lead until lap 36, when he pitted and the lead was passed to Earnhardt Jr. once again. Earnhardt Jr. and Kasey Kahne each held the lead for a lap before Kenseth cycled back to the lead with 21 laps to go. On the last lap, Kevin Harvick pulled up alongside Matt Kenseth, while Kahne got to the inside, creating a three-wide photo finish in which Kenseth prevailed. Michael McDowell and Joe Nemechek failed to make the Daytona 500. Kenseth stated that he "was kind of embarrassed to walk in the garage" but felt that his race performance "builds confidence in all of us, makes us feel like you can go out and get the job done if everybody does their jobs and we do everything right". Harvick's car failed post-race inspection because his car exceeded the maximum split on the track bar. He was disqualified, but his speed in qualifying was enough to get him into the Daytona 500. Greg Zipadelli, the competitions director at Harvick's team – Stewart–Haas Racing – referred to the infraction as "an adjustment during the race and it was more than it should have been".

Pos	Grid	No.	Driver	Team	Manufacturer	Laps	Status	Led
1	9	20	Matt Kenseth	Joe Gibbs Racing	Toyota	60	Running	31
2	10	5	Kasey Kahne	Hendrick Motorsports	Chevrolet	60	Running	1
3	6	9	Marcos Ambrose	Richard Petty Motorsports	Ford	60	Running	
4	4	88	Dale Earnhardt Jr.	Hendrick Motorsports	Chevrolet	60	Running	14
5	22	98	Josh Wise	Phil Parsons Racing	Ford	60	Running	
6	7	43	Aric Almirola	Richard Petty Motorsports	Ford	60	Running	
7	14	47	A. J. Allmendinger	JTG Daugherty Racing	Chevrolet	60	Running	
8	16	38	David Gilliland	Front Row Motorsports	Ford	60	Running	
9	3	31	Ryan Newman	Richard Childress Racing	Chevrolet	60	Running	
10	18	14	Tony Stewart	Stewart–Haas Racing	Chevrolet	60	Running	
11	20	26	Cole Whitt (R)	Swan Racing	Toyota	60	Running	
12	2	16	Greg Biffle	Roush Fenway Racing	Ford	60	Running	
13	13	10	Danica Patrick	Stewart–Haas Racing	Chevrolet	60	Running	
14	24	23	Alex Bowman (R)	BK Racing	Toyota	60	Running	
15	19	55	Brian Vickers	Michael Waltrip Racing	Toyota	60	Running	
16	8	22	Joey Logano	Team Penske	Ford	60	Running	
17	17	30	Parker Kligerman (R)	Swan Racing	Toyota	60	Running	
18	1	3	Austin Dillon (R)	Richard Childress Racing	Chevrolet	60	Running	14
19	5	17	Ricky Stenhouse Jr.	Roush Fenway Racing	Ford	60	Running	
20	11	18	Kyle Busch	Joe Gibbs Racing	Toyota	60	Running	
21	21	95	Michael McDowell	Leavine Family Racing	Ford	59	Running	
22	23	87	Joe Nemechek	Identity Ventures Racing	Toyota	59	Running	
23	15	36	Reed Sorenson	Tommy Baldwin Racing	Chevrolet	20	Wheel Bearing	
24	12	4	Kevin Harvick	Stewart–Haas Racing	Chevrolet	60	Disqualified	
Budweiser Duel race one results

=== Race Two ===
Martin Truex Jr. led the field to the green flag at 8:40 p.m., and Brad Keselowski took the lead on lap 3. Keselowski held the race lead for the next portion of the race, holding it until his pit stop on lap 35, which handed the lead to Casey Mears. On his pit stop, Keselowski was deemed to have been speeding while exiting, and had to serve a pass-through penalty. Denny Hamlin took the lead with 22 laps to go, and maintained the race lead until the end of the race, winning under caution.

Coming through turn four on the final lap, Jimmie Johnson ran out of gas, got loose after being tapped in the left corner panel, overcorrected and hit the wall collecting Jamie McMurray in the process. Truex Jr. had no way to avoid the wreck and rear-ended McMurray. While slowing to avoid the wreck, Clint Bowyer got rear-ended by Ryan Truex, slid to the runoff area taking David Ragan with him. Bowyer flipped over in the air and landed on all four wheels with the only damage being a destroyed drive-train. Ragan and Michael Waltrip were also caught in the wreck and both hit the inside wall head-on. Carl Edwards was caught by McMurray, but sustained minimal damage. McMurray made contact with Johnson again as they continued on into the grass, destroying the front ends of their cars. Bobby Labonte and Terry Labonte, who were both 30 seconds behind the leader on the final lap, raced their way into the Daytona 500, at the expense of Eric McClure, Morgan Shepherd and Ryan Truex. Hamlin's team owner, Joe Gibbs, stated Hamlin had "worked extremely hard" for the result, and he thought his team was "all hungry when the year started".

Pos	Grid	No.	Driver	Team	Manufacturer	Laps	Time/retired	Led
1	11	11	Denny Hamlin	Joe Gibbs Racing	Toyota	60	Running	23
2	4	24	Jeff Gordon	Hendrick Motorsports	Chevrolet	60	Running	0
3	14	41	Kurt Busch	Stewart–Haas Racing	Chevrolet	60	Running	0
4	5	27	Paul Menard	Richard Childress Racing	Chevrolet	60	Running	0
5	6	33	Brian Scott	Richard Childress Racing	Chevrolet	60	Running	0
6	13	21	Trevor Bayne	Wood Brothers Racing	Ford	60	Running	0
7	12	42	Kyle Larson (R)	Chip Ganassi Racing	Chevrolet	60	Running	0
8	1	78	Martin Truex Jr.	Furniture Row Racing	Chevrolet	60	Running	1
9	16	40	Landon Cassill	Hillman-Circle Sport LLC	Chevrolet	60	Running	0
10	10	15	Clint Bowyer	Michael Waltrip Racing	Toyota	60	Running	0
11	19	1	Jamie McMurray	Chip Ganassi Racing	Chevrolet	60	Running	0
12	21	32	Terry Labonte	Go FAS Racing	Ford	60	Running	0
13	22	52	Bobby Labonte	HScott Motorsports	Chevrolet	60	Running	0
14	8	13	Casey Mears	Germain Racing	Chevrolet	60	Running	1
15	2	99	Carl Edwards	Roush Fenway Racing	Ford	60	Running	0
16	7	48	Jimmie Johnson	Hendrick Motorsports	Chevrolet	59	Accident	0
17	20	34	David Ragan	Front Row Motorsports	Ford	59	Accident	0
18	17	66	Michael Waltrip	Michael Waltrip Racing	Toyota	59	Accident	0
19	23	83	Ryan Truex (R)	BK Racing	Toyota	59	Running	0
20	15	51	Justin Allgaier (R)	HScott Motorsports	Chevrolet	59	Running	0
21	9	7	Michael Annett (R)	Tommy Baldwin Racing	Chevrolet	59	Running	0
22	24	93	Morgan Shepherd	BK Racing	Toyota	59	Running	0
23	18	35	Eric McClure	Front Row Motorsports	Ford	57	Running	0
24	3	2	Brad Keselowski	Team Penske	Ford	57	Running	34
Budweiser Duel race two results

=== Starting lineup ===
Pos	No.	Driver	Team	Manufacturer
1	3	Austin Dillon (R)	Richard Childress Racing	Chevrolet
2	78	Martin Truex Jr.	Furniture Row Racing	Chevrolet
3	20	Matt Kenseth (W)	Joe Gibbs Racing	Toyota
4	11	Denny Hamlin	Joe Gibbs Racing	Toyota
5	5	Kasey Kahne	Hendrick Motorsports	Chevrolet
6	24	Jeff Gordon (W)	Hendrick Motorsports	Chevrolet
7	9	Marcos Ambrose	Richard Petty Motorsports	Ford
8	41	Kurt Busch	Stewart–Haas Racing	Chevrolet
9	88	Dale Earnhardt Jr. (W)	Hendrick Motorsports	Chevrolet
10	27	Paul Menard	Richard Childress Racing	Chevrolet
11	98	Josh Wise	Phil Parsons Racing	Ford
12	33	Brian Scott (R)	Circle Sport	Chevrolet
13	43	Aric Almirola	Richard Petty Motorsports	Ford
14	21	Trevor Bayne (W)	Wood Brothers Racing	Ford
15	47	A. J. Allmendinger	JTG Daugherty Racing	Toyota
16	42	Kyle Larson (R)	Chip Ganassi Racing	Chevrolet
17	38	David Gilliland	Front Row Motorsports	Ford
18	40	Landon Cassill	Hillman Racing	Chevrolet
19	31	Ryan Newman (W)	Richard Childress Racing	Chevrolet
20	15	Clint Bowyer	Michael Waltrip Racing	Toyota
21	14	Tony Stewart	Stewart–Haas Racing	Chevrolet
22	1	Jamie McMurray (W)	Chip Ganassi Racing	Chevrolet
23	26	Cole Whitt (R)	Swan Racing	Toyota
24	32	Terry Labonte	Go FAS Racing	Ford
25	16	Greg Biffle	Roush Fenway Racing	Ford
26	52	Bobby Labonte	HScott Motorsports	Chevrolet
27	10	Danica Patrick	Stewart–Haas Racing	Chevrolet
28	13	Casey Mears	Germain Racing	Chevrolet
29	23	Alex Bowman (R)	BK Racing	Toyota
30	99	Carl Edwards	Roush Fenway Racing	Ford
31	55	Brian Vickers	Michael Waltrip Racing	Toyota
32	48	Jimmie Johnson (W)	Hendrick Motorsports	Chevrolet
33	2	Brad Keselowski	Team Penske	Ford
34	17	Ricky Stenhouse Jr.	Roush Fenway Racing	Ford
35	22	Joey Logano	Team Penske	Ford
36	7	Michael Annett (R)	Tommy Baldwin Racing	Chevrolet
37	18	Kyle Busch	Joe Gibbs Racing	Toyota
38	4	Kevin Harvick (W)	Stewart–Haas Racing	Chevrolet
39	36	Reed Sorenson	Tommy Baldwin Racing	Chevrolet
40	51	Justin Allgaier (R)	HScott Motorsports	Chevrolet
41	30	Parker Kligerman (R)	Swan Racing	Toyota
42	66	Michael Waltrip (W)	Identity Ventures Racing	Toyota
43	34	David Ragan	Front Row Motorsports	Ford
Did not qualify
	35	Eric McClure (R)	Front Row Motorsports	Ford
	87	Joe Nemechek	Identity Ventures Racing	Toyota
	93	Morgan Shepherd	BK Racing	Toyota
	83	Ryan Truex (R)	BK Racing	Toyota
	95	Michael McDowell	Leavine Family Racing	Ford
	77	Dave Blaney	Randy Humphrey Racing	Ford
Official starting lineup

== Practice (post-duel) ==
=== Fourth practice February 19 ===
Denny Hamlin was the fastest in the fourth practice session on February 19 with a time of 45.096 and a speed of 199.574 mph (321.183 km/h).

	No.	Driver	Team	Manufacturer	Time	Speed
1	11	Denny Hamlin	Joe Gibbs Racing	Toyota	45.096	199.574
2	5	Kasey Kahne	Hendrick Motorsports	Chevrolet	45.097	199.570
3	66	Michael Waltrip (W)	Michael Waltrip Racing	Toyota	45.234	198.965
Official fourth practice results

=== Fifth practice February 21 ===
Ricky Stenhouse Jr. was the fastest in the fifth practice session on February 21 with a time of 45.679 and a speed of 197.027 mph (317.084 km/h).

	No.	Driver	Team	Manufacturer	Time	Speed
1	17	Ricky Stenhouse Jr.	Roush Fenway Racing	Ford	45.679	197.027
2	16	Greg Biffle	Roush Fenway Racing	Ford	45.696	196.954
3	10	Danica Patrick	Stewart–Haas Racing	Chevrolet	45.705	196.915
Official fifth practice results

=== Final practice February 22 ===
Kurt Busch was the fastest in the final practice session on February 22 with a time of 45.541 and a speed of 197.624 mph (318.045 km/h).

	No.	Driver	Team	Manufacturer	Time	Speed
1	41	Kurt Busch	Stewart–Haas Racing	Chevrolet	45.541	197.624
2	5	Kasey Kahne	Hendrick Motorsports	Chevrolet	45.572	197.490
3	1	Jamie McMurray (W)	Chip Ganassi Racing	Chevrolet	45.576	197.472
Official final practice results

== Race ==
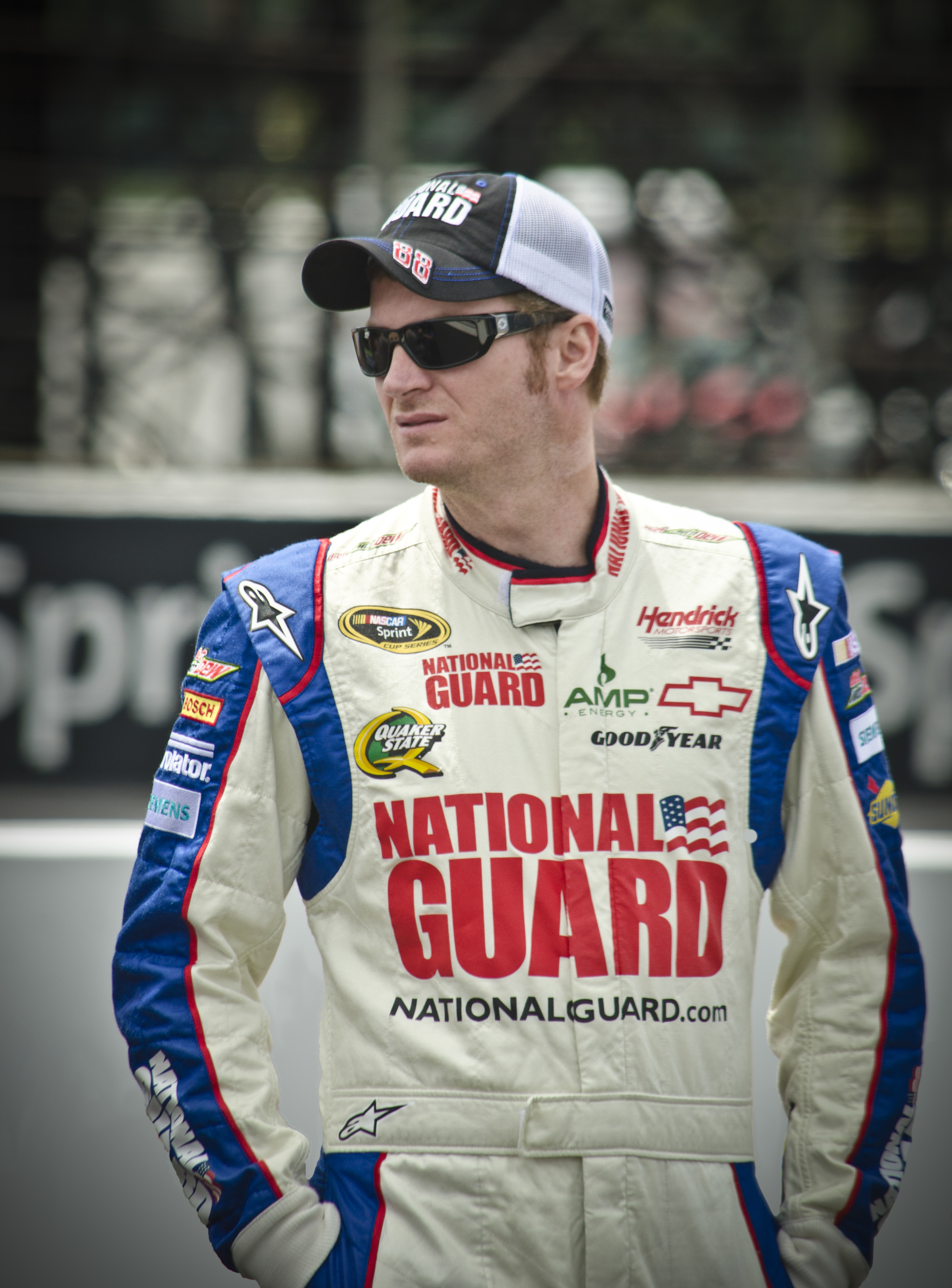
Dale Earnhardt Jr. won his second Daytona 500 exactly ten years after he won his first 500

=== First half ===
==== Start ====
Austin Dillon started on pole, but led only the first lap. On the next lap, Denny Hamlin took the lead from Dillon. On lap 11, Hamlin dropped back, letting Kurt Busch take the lead. The first caution came out on lap 23 when Kyle Larson spun in turn 2 after getting two flat tires. Paul Menard assumed the lead on the restart and led for five laps, before Hamlin passed him for the lead. Kyle Busch passed him a lap later for the lead. On lap 31, Martin Truex Jr.'s engine blew up, bringing out the second caution a lap later.

==== Rain delay ====
While the field was under caution, it began to rain and by lap 39, the red flag was thrown with Kyle Busch leading the race. At 2:50 p.m. local time, a tornado warning was issued for the speedway area and the grandstands were evacuated. The red flag lasted for 6 hours and 22 minutes as track-drying was delayed due to ongoing rain showers; this would make it the longest rain delay in Daytona 500 history. The race restarted at 8:52 p.m. local time.

==== Restart ====
After the red flag was lifted, the race ran seven laps under caution while the Air Titan did a pass over pit road. After pit stops, the race restarted on lap 47, with Kyle Busch still leading. Busch and Kasey Kahne traded the lead over the next few laps, before both faded and the Team Penske Fords of Brad Keselowski and Joey Logano took the point and swapped the lead for several laps. Menard also led seven laps during this time. During green flag pit stops around lap 85, Trevor Bayne, Aric Almirola, A. J. Allmendinger, Justin Allgaier, Michael Waltrip and Danica Patrick briefly held the lead for a couple laps at a time due to different pit strategies. Also during the cycle, moisture at the exit of pit road from the heavy rain shower caused Kahne to spin out into the grass exiting pit road and Kyle Busch pulled an air hose out of his stall exiting pit road, resulting in a pass through penalty – despite these incidents, the race remained under green.

=== Second half ===
==== Halfway ====
When the pit stop cycle ended, Paul Menard was on point, where he stayed until lap 107, when Jimmie Johnson took the lead and held it for 9 laps, until Keselowski took it on lap 116. Five laps later, Johnson passed Keselowski back for the lead, and held it until another cycle of pit stops on lap 127. At the conclusion of this cycle, Dale Earnhardt Jr. assumed the lead on lap 131 for the first time. He held the lead for thirteen laps, until lap 144, when Carl Edwards passed him. A lap later, Earnhardt retook the lead from Edwards.

==== The "Big One" ====
On lap 145, the third caution came out for a crash on the front straightaway. It started when Kevin Harvick and Brian Scott made contact in the exit of turn 4, sending Scott into Almirola. Almirola shot across the track and collected several more cars including Patrick, Waltrip, Parker Kligerman, Paul Menard, David Gilliland, Josh Wise, Austin Dillon, Justin Allgaier, Kasey Kahne and Marcos Ambrose. Patrick took the worst hit, as her car got turned by Almirola and slammed the outside wall in the tri-oval in a part of the track that lacked a SAFER barrier; the section of wall where Patrick hit the wall would receive a SAFER barrier before the rain-shortened Coke Zero 400 that summer. Upon exiting her car, Patrick felt "upset because the car felt really good, it was the best car [she's] had all of Speedweeks" and that her car "could catch whoever and move around...and move forward". Waltrip was more forthright in his thoughts on the crash, stating he "was going to be fine" but that another car "cleaned our clock from behind".

==== Closing stages ====
Greg Biffle assumed the lead from Earnhardt Jr. on lap 151 after pit stops. He led the restart on lap 154, but Earnhardt Jr. quickly regained the lead for two laps, before Biffle repassed him. Biffle led for three more laps before Earnhardt Jr. repassed him on lap 159. On lap 162, the fourth caution came out for a crash in turn 4 at the back of the pack. It occurred when Kyle Larson spun in turn 4 from contact with Dillon, causing major damage to several more cars including Marcos Ambrose, Kahne, Annett, Jamie McMurray, Ryan Newman, Brian Scott, Brian Vickers and Casey Mears. Earnhardt Jr. continued to lead on the restart on lap 169. He led until lap 173, when Biffle again passed him for the lead. Biffle led for two laps before he was passed by Edwards for the lead. Edwards led three laps, before Earnhardt Jr. passed them back for a lap, before handing the lead back to Edwards for four more laps. Earnhardt Jr. gained the lead for the last time on lap 183.

===== Finish =====
On lap 184, the fifth caution flag came out when Bayne's car snapped loose and crashed into the outside wall on the back straightaway. When the race restarted on lap 188, Earnhardt Jr. moved in front of Johnson to secure the lead. On lap 194, the sixth caution came out for a crash in turn 3. It started when Austin Dillon turned Ryan Newman. Newman's car turned sideways and collected five more cars, including Allgaier, Scott, Kligerman, Terry Labonte, and Cole Whitt, and set up a two lap shootout for the last restart. Although close on fuel and with a piece of bear bond from Newman's car stuck to his grill, Earnhardt Jr. took off on the last restart, moving in front of Jeff Gordon. Over the course of the last lap, an intense battle for the runner-up spots unfolded between Gordon, Hamlin, Johnson and Keselowski. Heading through turn 4, Harvick tried to force himself between McMurray and Kyle Busch in turn 4, and a wreck ensued as Harvick was sent into the wall, collecting a number of other cars including McMurray, Busch, Edwards, and Reed Sorenson. While that was happening, Earnhardt Jr. held off Hamlin and took the caution and checkered flags to score his second Daytona 500 victory. Earnhardt Jr. stated that his car was "awesome" and after some help from Gordon on the restart, Earnhardt Jr. "just took care of it from there".

=== Race results ===
Pos	Car No.	Driver	Team	Manufacturer	Laps	Time/retired	Led	Points
1	88	Dale Earnhardt Jr. (W)	Hendrick Motorsports	Chevrolet	200	3:26:29.000	54	48
2	11	Denny Hamlin	Joe Gibbs Racing	Toyota	200	+0.092	16	43
3	2	Brad Keselowski	Team Penske	Ford	200	+0.234	13	42
4	24	Jeff Gordon (W)	Hendrick Motorsports	Chevrolet	200	+0.280	0	40
5	48	Jimmie Johnson (W)	Hendrick Motorsports	Chevrolet	200	+0.203	15	40
6	20	Matt Kenseth (W)	Joe Gibbs Racing	Toyota	200	+0.391	0	38
7	17	Ricky Stenhouse Jr.	Roush Fenway Racing	Ford	200	+0.378	0	37
8	16	Greg Biffle	Roush Fenway Racing	Ford	200	+0.508	8	37
9	3	Austin Dillon	Richard Childress Racing	Chevrolet	200	+0.478	1	36
10	13	Casey Mears	Germain Racing	Chevrolet	200	+0.808	0	34
11	22	Joey Logano	Team Penske	Ford	200	+1.474	2	34
12	40	Landon Cassill	Hillman Racing	Chevrolet	200	+2.939	0	-
13	4	Kevin Harvick (W)	Stewart–Haas Racing	Chevrolet	200	+4.175	0	31
14	1	Jamie McMurray (W)	Chip Ganassi Racing	Chevrolet	200	+4.269	0	30
15	52	Bobby Labonte	HScott Motorsports	Chevrolet	200	+5.299	0	29
16	36	Reed Sorenson	Tommy Baldwin Racing	Chevrolet	200	+5.737	0	28
17	99	Carl Edwards	Roush Fenway Racing	Ford	200	+10.573	8	28
18	9	Marcos Ambrose	Richard Petty Motorsports	Ford	200	+12.845	0	26
19	18	Kyle Busch	Joe Gibbs Racing	Toyota	200	+21.527	19	26
20	32	Terry Labonte	Go FAS Racing	Ford	200	+1 lap	0	24
21	41	Kurt Busch	Stewart–Haas Racing	Chevrolet	199	+1 lap	15	24
22	31	Ryan Newman (W)	Richard Childress Racing	Chevrolet	199	+1 lap	0	22
23	23	Alex Bowman (R)	BK Racing	Toyota	198	+2 laps	0	21
24	98	Josh Wise	Phil Parsons Racing	Chevrolet	196	+4 laps	0	20
25	33	Brian Scott (R)	Richard Childress Racing	Chevrolet	196	+4 laps	0	-
26	47	A. J. Allmendinger	JTG Daugherty Racing	Chevrolet	194	+6 laps	1	19
27	51	Justin Allgaier (R)	HScott Motorsports	Chevrolet	193	Contact	4	18
28	26	Cole Whitt (R)	Swan Racing	Toyota	193	Contact	0	16
29	30	Parker Kligerman (R)	Swan Racing	Toyota	193	Contact	0	15
30	55	Brian Vickers	Michael Waltrip Racing	Toyota	192	+8 laps	0	14
31	5	Kasey Kahne	Hendrick Motorsports	Chevrolet	192	+8 laps	2	14
32	27	Paul Menard	Richard Childress Racing	Chevrolet	184	+16 laps	29	13
33	21	Trevor Bayne (W)	Wood Brothers Racing	Ford	183	Contact	2	-
34	34	David Ragan	Front Row Motorsports	Ford	176	+24 laps	0	10
35	14	Tony Stewart	Stewart–Haas Racing	Chevrolet	174	+26 laps	0	9
36	38	David Gilliland	Front Row Motorsports	Ford	171	+29 laps	0	8
37	7	Michael Annett (R)	Tommy Baldwin Racing	Chevrolet	161	Contact	0	7
38	42	Kyle Larson (R)	Chip Ganassi Racing	Chevrolet	160	Contact	0	6
39	43	Aric Almirola	Richard Petty Motorsports	Ford	146	Contact	5	6
40	10	Danica Patrick	Stewart–Haas Racing	Chevrolet	145	Contact	2	5
41	66	Michael Waltrip (W)	Identity Ventures Racing	Toyota	144	Contact	4	4
42	15	Clint Bowyer	Michael Waltrip Racing	Toyota	127	Engine	0	2
43	78	Martin Truex Jr.	Furniture Row Racing	Chevrolet	30	Engine	0	1

=== Race statistics ===
- Lead changes: 42 among different drivers
- Cautions/Laps: 7 for 39
- Red flags: 1 for 6 hours, 21 minutes and 40 seconds
- Time of race: 3 hours, 26 minutes and 29 seconds
- Average speed: 145.29 miles per hour (233.82 km/h)

Lap Leaders
Laps	Leader
1	Austin Dillon (R)
2-10	Denny Hamlin
11-25	Kurt Busch
26-30	Paul Menard
31	Denny Hamlin
32-45	Kyle Busch
46	Kasey Kahne
47	Kyle Busch
48	Kasey Kahne
49	Kyle Busch
50-55	Denny Hamlin
56	Kyle Busch
57	Brad Keselowski
58-59	Kyle Busch
60-63	Brad Keselowski
64-70	Paul Menard
71-72	Joey Logano
73-75	Brad Keselowski
76-77	Trevor Bayne (W)
78-82	Aric Almirola
83	A. J. Allmendinger
84	Justin Allgaier (R)
85-86	Danica Patrick
87	Justin Allgaier (R)
88-89	Michael Waltrip (W)
90-106	Paul Menard
107-115	Jimmie Johnson (W)
116-120	Brad Keselowski
121-126	Jimmie Johnson (W)
127-128	Justin Allgaier (R)
129-130	Michael Waltrip (W)
131-143	Dale Earnhardt Jr. (W)
144	Carl Edwards
145-150	Dale Earnhardt Jr. (W)
151-153	Greg Biffle
154-155	Dale Earnhardt Jr. (W)
156-158	Greg Biffle
159-172	Dale Earnhardt Jr. (W)
173-174	Greg Biffle
175-177	Carl Edwards
178	Dale Earnhardt Jr. (W)
179-182	Carl Edwards
183-200	Dale Earnhardt Jr. (W)

Total laps led
Leader	Laps
Dale Earnhardt Jr. (W)	54
Paul Menard	29
Kyle Busch	19
Denny Hamlin	16
Jimmie Johnson (W)	15
Kurt Busch	15
Brad Keselowski	13
Greg Biffle	8
Carl Edwards	8
Aric Almirola	5
Justin Allgaier (R)	4
Michael Waltrip (W)	4
Joey Logano	2
Kasey Kahne	2
Trevor Bayne (W)	2
Danica Patrick	2
Austin Dillon (R)	1
A. J. Allmendinger	1

== Media ==
=== Television ===
Since 2001, (except for 2002, 2004 and 2006) the Daytona 500 has been carried by Fox. The booth crew has remained the same since the beginning with longtime NASCAR lap-by-lap commentator Mike Joy, two-time Daytona 500 winning crew chief Larry McReynolds, and 1989 Daytona 500 winner Darrell Waltrip. This was the final 500 on Fox for Steve Byrnes, Krista Voda, and Jeff Hammond. Fox repeated the 2013 Daytona 500 during the rain delay, confusing many viewers. When Fox showed Jimmie Johnson's winning moment from the 2013 race, he received a large number of congratulatory tweets. He was unaware that Fox had repeated the previous year's race during the rain delay.

Fox Television
Booth announcers	Pit reporters
Lap-by-lap: Mike Joy; Color-commentator: Larry McReynolds; Color commentator: Darrell Waltrip	Matt Yocum; Steve Byrnes; Krista Voda; Jeff Hammond

=== Radio ===
The 2014 Daytona 500 was broadcast on radio by the Motor Racing Network and simulcast on Sirius XM NASCAR Radio. MRN Radio has covered the Daytona 500 since 1970. Joe Moore and Barney Hall covered the race from the booth. Longtime turn announcer and prodigy of MRN co-founder Ken Squier Dave Moody was the lead turn announcer. He called the race when the field was racing through turns 1 & 2. Mike Bagley worked the backstretch for the Daytona 500. Jeff Striegle called the race when the field was racing through turns 3 & 4. On pit road, MRN was manned by lead pit reporter and NASCAR Hall of Fame executive director Winston Kelly. Alongside him were Steve Post, Woody Cain, and Pete Pistone.

MRN Radio
Booth announcers	Turn announcers	Pit reporters
Lead announcer: Joe Moore; Announcer: Barney Hall	Turns 1 & 2: Dave Moody; Backstretch: Mike Bagley; Turns 3 & 4: Jeff Striegle	Winston Kelly; Steve Post; Woody Cain; Pete Pistone

== Standings after the race ==
Drivers' Championship standings

Pos	Driver	Points
1	Dale Earnhardt Jr.	48
2	Denny Hamlin	43
3	Brad Keselowski	42
4	Jeff Gordon	40
5	Jimmie Johnson	40
6	Matt Kenseth	38
7	Ricky Stenhouse Jr.	37
8	Greg Biffle	37
9	Austin Dillon (R)	36
10	Casey Mears	34
11	Joey Logano	34
12	Kevin Harvick	31
13	Jamie McMurray	30
14	Bobby Labonte	29
15	Reed Sorenson	28
16	Carl Edwards	28

Manufacturers' Championship standings

Pos	Manufacturer	Points
1	Chevrolet	48
2	Toyota	43
3	Ford	42

- Note: Only the first sixteen positions are included for the driver standings.

== See also ==
- 2014 Sprint Unlimited, held on February 15
- 2014 UNOH Battle at the Beach, held on February 18
- 2014 Budweiser Duels, held on February 20

Previous race: 2013 Ford EcoBoost 400	Sprint Cup Series; 2014 season	Next race: 2014 The Profit on CNBC 500
