= 2014 Goody's Headache Relief Shot 500 =

33rd race of 2014 NASCAR Sprint Cup season

Race details
- Race 33 of 36 in the 2014 NASCAR Sprint Cup Series
- Martinsville Speedway
- Date: October 26, 2014
- Location: Martinsville Speedway in Ridgeway, Virginia
- Course: Permanent racing facility
- Course length: 0.526 miles (0.847 km)
- Distance: 500 laps, 263 mi (423.257 km)
- Weather: Sunny with a temperature of 70 °F (21 °C); wind out of the WNW at 10 miles per hour (16 km/h)
- Average speed: 70.725 mph (113.821 km/h)

Pole position
Driver	Jamie McMurray	Chip Ganassi Racing
- Time: 18.954

Most laps led
Driver	Jeff Gordon	Hendrick Motorsports
- Laps: 130

Winner
No. 88	Dale Earnhardt Jr.	Hendrick Motorsports

Television in the United States
- Network: ESPN & MRN
- Announcers: Allen Bestwick, Dale Jarrett and Andy Petree (Television); Joe Moore and Jeff Striegle (Booth); Dave Moody (Backstretch) (Radio)
- Nielsen ratings: 2.5/5 (Final); 2.3/5 (Overnight); 4.083 Million viewers

The 2014 Goody's Headache Relief Shot 500 was a NASCAR Sprint Cup Series stock car race held on October 26, 2014, at Martinsville Speedway in Ridgeway, Virginia. Contested over 500 laps on the 0.526-mile (0.847-kilometre) short track, it was the 33rd race of the 2014 Sprint Cup Series season, as well as the seventh race of ten in the Chase for the Sprint Cup. Dale Earnhardt Jr. won the race, his fourth win of the season. Jeff Gordon finished second, while Ryan Newman, Tony Stewart, and Joey Logano rounded out the Top 5. The top rookies in the race were Austin Dillon (12th), Justin Allgaier (17th), and Cole Whitt (18th).

== Report ==
=== Background ===
Martinsville Speedway is an International Speedway Corporation-owned NASCAR stock car racing track located in Henry County, in Ridgeway, Virginia, just to the south of Martinsville. At 0.526 miles (0.847 kilometres) in length, it is the shortest track in the NASCAR Sprint Cup Series. The track was also one of the first paved oval tracks in NASCAR, being built in 1947 by H. Clay Earles. It is also the only race track that has been on the NASCAR circuit from its beginning in 1948.

=== Entry list ===
Forty-three drivers were entered for the race.

No.	Driver	Team	Manufacturer
1	Jamie McMurray	Chip Ganassi Racing	Chevrolet
2	Brad Keselowski (PC2) (CC)	Team Penske	Ford
3	Austin Dillon (R)	Richard Childress Racing	Chevrolet
4	Kevin Harvick (CC)	Stewart–Haas Racing	Chevrolet
5	Kasey Kahne	Hendrick Motorsports	Chevrolet
7	Michael Annett (R)	Tommy Baldwin Racing	Chevrolet
9	Marcos Ambrose	Richard Petty Motorsports	Ford
10	Danica Patrick	Stewart–Haas Racing	Chevrolet
11	Denny Hamlin (CC)	Joe Gibbs Racing	Toyota
13	Casey Mears	Germain Racing	Chevrolet
14	Tony Stewart (PC3)	Stewart–Haas Racing	Chevrolet
15	Clint Bowyer	Michael Waltrip Racing	Toyota
16	Greg Biffle	Roush Fenway Racing	Ford
17	Ricky Stenhouse Jr.	Roush Fenway Racing	Ford
18	Kyle Busch	Joe Gibbs Racing	Toyota
20	Matt Kenseth (PC5) (CC)	Joe Gibbs Racing	Toyota
22	Joey Logano (CC)	Team Penske	Ford
23	Alex Bowman (R)	BK Racing	Toyota
24	Jeff Gordon (PC6) (CC)	Hendrick Motorsports	Chevrolet
26	Cole Whitt (R)	BK Racing	Toyota
27	Paul Menard	Richard Childress Racing	Chevrolet
31	Ryan Newman (CC)	Richard Childress Racing	Chevrolet
32	Kyle Fowler (i)	Go FAS Racing	Ford
33	Travis Kvapil	Hillman–Circle Sport	Chevrolet
34	David Ragan	Front Row Motorsports	Ford
36	Reed Sorenson	Tommy Baldwin Racing	Chevrolet
38	David Gilliland	Front Row Motorsports	Ford
40	Landon Cassill (i)	Hillman–Circle Sport	Chevrolet
41	Kurt Busch (PC4)	Stewart–Haas Racing	Chevrolet
42	Kyle Larson (R)	Chip Ganassi Racing	Chevrolet
43	Aric Almirola	Richard Petty Motorsports	Ford
44	Timmy Hill	Team Xtreme Racing	Chevrolet
47	A. J. Allmendinger	JTG Daugherty Racing	Chevrolet
48	Jimmie Johnson (PC1)	Hendrick Motorsports	Chevrolet
51	Justin Allgaier (R)	HScott Motorsports	Chevrolet
55	Brian Vickers	Michael Waltrip Racing	Toyota
66	Mike Wallace (i)	Identity Ventures Racing	Toyota
78	Martin Truex Jr.	Furniture Row Racing	Chevrolet
83	J. J. Yeley (i)	BK Racing	Toyota
88	Dale Earnhardt Jr.	Hendrick Motorsports	Chevrolet
93	Clay Rogers	BK Racing	Toyota
98	Josh Wise	Phil Parsons Racing	Chevrolet
99	Carl Edwards (CC)	Roush Fenway Racing	Ford
Official entry list

Key	Meaning
(R)	Rookie
(i)	Ineligible for points
(PC#)	Past champions provisional
(CC)	Chase Contender

== Practice and qualifying ==
Jeff Gordon was the fastest in the first practice session with a time of 19.079 and a speed of 99.251 mph (159.729 km/h). Justin Allgaier spun his car in the opening minutes of practice. Jamie McMurray lightly brushed the wall, but the damage was cosmetic. McMurray won the pole with a time of 18.954 and a speed of 99.905 mph (160.782 km/h). "Great start to our weekend for our McDonald's Chevrolet," said McMurray. "We tested here and I thought we had a really good test. Keith (Rodden, crew chief) and Josh (Sell, Engineer) just did a really good job adjusting on the car. It's amazing you can go quicker your second time out. For years we came here to these places and ran slower. That was a good lap." "I thought that first lap would be enough to sneak our way in there and then we could make some adjustments," Gordon said. "But I don't mind starting 13th. It's not a bad place to start; you just want that really good pit stall. So we'll definitely suffer with the pit stall a little bit, but we can still win it from there. Our car's really good." "We just missed it today," Kevin Harvick said. "We were way too loose. ... We have to get better and be ready to go on Sunday." Harvick slapped the wall twice during qualifying and qualified 33rd. Jimmie Johnson was the fastest in the second practice session with a time of 19.318 and a speed of 98.023 mph (157.753 km/h). Justin Allgaier had smoke billowing from his car during the session. The culprit was a loss of power steering. Kevin Harvick was the fastest in the final practice session with a time of 19.457 and a speed of 97.322 mph (156.625 km/h).

=== Qualifying result ===
Pos	No.	Driver	Team	Manufacturer	R1	R2
1	1	Jamie McMurray	Chip Ganassi Racing	Chevrolet	19.033	18.954
2	22	Joey Logano	Team Penske	Ford	19.109	19.011
3	20	Matt Kenseth	Joe Gibbs Racing	Toyota	18.971	19.066
4	14	Tony Stewart	Stewart–Haas Racing	Chevrolet	19.155	19.070
5	11	Denny Hamlin	Joe Gibbs Racing	Toyota	19.048	19.076
6	2	Brad Keselowski	Team Penske	Ford	19.093	19.081
7	48	Jimmie Johnson	Hendrick Motorsports	Chevrolet	19.089	19.083
8	18	Kyle Busch	Joe Gibbs Racing	Toyota	19.134	19.087
9	31	Ryan Newman	Richard Childress Racing	Chevrolet	19.141	19.159
10	41	Kurt Busch	Stewart–Haas Racing	Chevrolet	19.150	19.201
11	99	Carl Edwards	Roush Fenway Racing	Ford	19.152	19.214
12	15	Clint Bowyer	Michael Waltrip Racing	Toyota	19.094	19.258
13	24	Jeff Gordon	Hendrick Motorsports	Chevrolet	19.158	—
14	27	Paul Menard	Richard Childress Racing	Chevrolet	19.163	—
15	47	A. J. Allmendinger	JTG Daugherty Racing	Chevrolet	19.164	—
16	42	Kyle Larson (R)	Chip Ganassi Racing	Chevrolet	19.196	—
17	55	Brian Vickers	Michael Waltrip Racing	Toyota	19.200	—
18	17	Ricky Stenhouse Jr.	Roush Fenway Racing	Ford	19.207	—
19	3	Austin Dillon (R)	Richard Childress Racing	Chevrolet	19.231	—
20	13	Casey Mears	Germain Racing	Chevrolet	19.231	—
21	16	Greg Biffle	Roush Fenway Racing	Ford	19.235	—
22	51	Justin Allgaier (R)	HScott Motorsports	Chevrolet	19.256	—
23	88	Dale Earnhardt Jr.	Hendrick Motorsports	Chevrolet	19.257	—
24	5	Kasey Kahne	Hendrick Motorsports	Chevrolet	19.267	—
25	9	Marcos Ambrose	Richard Petty Motorsports	Ford	19.280	—
26	78	Martin Truex Jr.	Furniture Row Racing	Chevrolet	19.283	—
27	43	Aric Almirola	Richard Petty Motorsports	Ford	19.300	—
28	40	Landon Cassill	Hillman–Circle Sport	Chevrolet	19.305	—
29	34	David Ragan	Front Row Motorsports	Ford	19.308	—
30	10	Danica Patrick	Stewart–Haas Racing	Chevrolet	19.341	—
31	36	Reed Sorenson	Tommy Baldwin Racing	Chevrolet	19.345	—
32	23	Alex Bowman (R)	BK Racing	Toyota	19.347	—
33	4	Kevin Harvick	Stewart–Haas Racing	Chevrolet	19.355	—
34	38	David Gilliland	Front Row Motorsports	Ford	19.365	—
35	98	Josh Wise	Phil Parsons Racing	Chevrolet	19.376	—
36	26	Cole Whitt (R)	BK Racing	Toyota	19.383	—
37	7	Michael Annett (R)	Tommy Baldwin Racing	Chevrolet	19.457	—
38	93	Clay Rogers	BK Racing	Toyota	19.568	—
39	33	Travis Kvapil	Hillman–Circle Sport	Chevrolet	19.583	—
40	83	J. J. Yeley	BK Racing	Toyota	19.611	—
41	44	Timmy Hill	Team XTREME Racing	Chevrolet	19.719	—
42	32	Kyle Fowler	Go FAS Racing	Ford	19.787	—
43	66	Mike Wallace	Identity Ventures Racing	Toyota	19.800	—

== Race ==
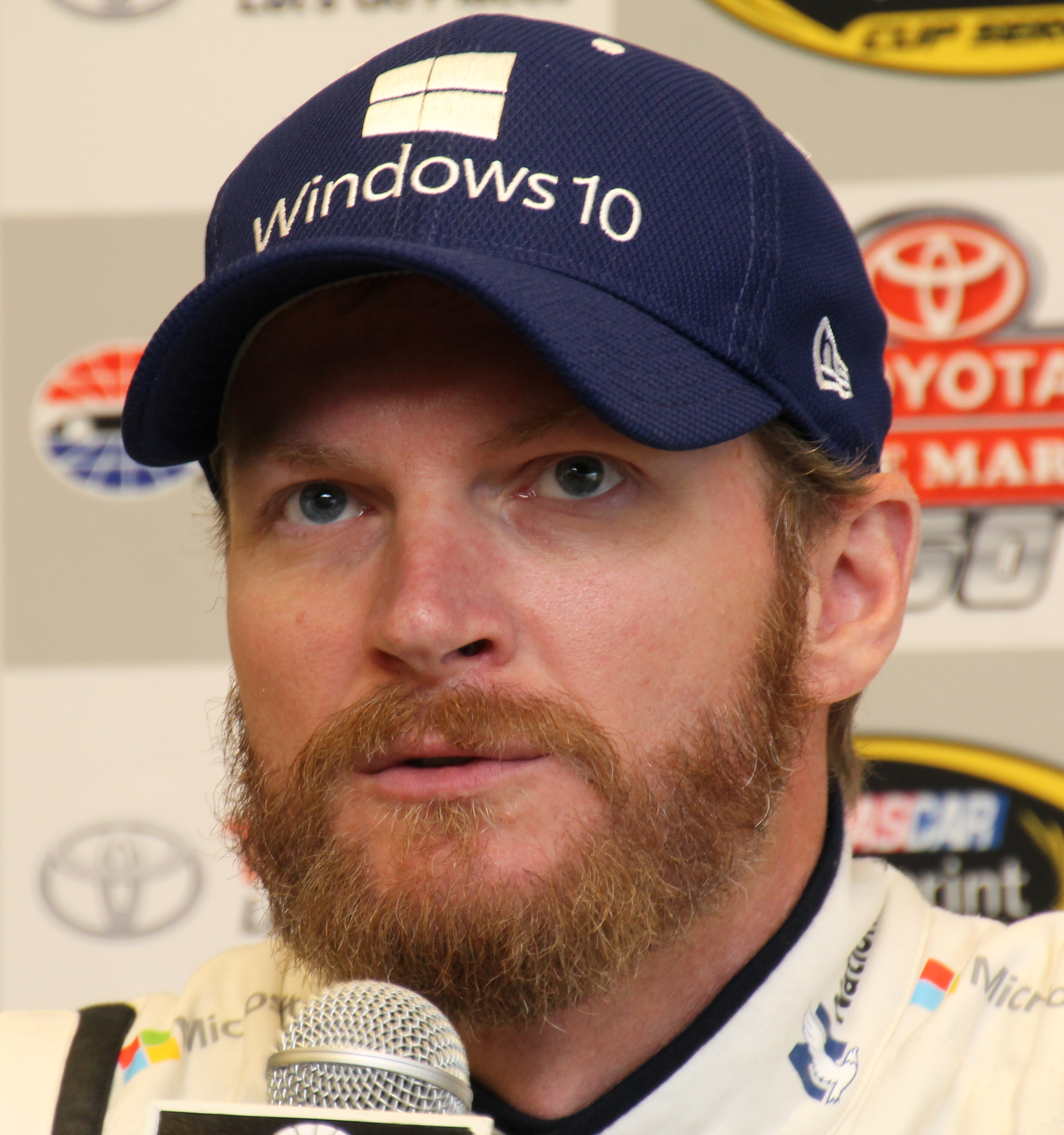
Dale Earnhardt Jr. won the race.

The race was scheduled to begin at 1:43 PM Eastern time, but it started at 1:48 p.m. with Jamie McMurray leading the field to the green. The first caution flag came out on lap 4 when Alex Bowman hopped the curb in turn 2 and spun around. The race restarted on lap nine and Matt Kenseth took the lead from McMurray for a lap, but gave the lead back to him the next lap. On lap 16, the second caution flag wave when Josh Wise tapped the corner of Travis Kvapil in turn 1 and sent him spinning. The race restarted on lap 21 with McMurray still leading. The third caution occurred on lap 75 when Kyle Fowler spun out in turn 2. The race restarted on lap 82 with McMurray still leading.

On lap 85, Jeff Gordon took the lead from McMurray. On lap 101, Jimmie Johnson was running third when he made an unscheduled stop to repair a loose wheel. He exited pit road in 38th place, and two laps down, but made one lap back by passing Gordon thanks to fresher tires. On lap 123, Gordon moved into second on the all-time laps led list at Martinsville Speedway.

The fourth caution of the race flew on lap 160 after Kasey Kahne tapped Brian Vickers and spun him around in turn 4 in front of the leader. "I was passing him and he ran me into the Turn 2 wall or he was going to, so I lifted. Then he blocked into 3, so I turned to go low and then he comes low and spun himself out," Kahne said after being released from the infield care center for an unrelated incident on Lap 438. "He definitely wrecked us on purpose the first time, I mean look at the video," Vickers said. "He just hooked us in the bumper and just wrecked us, I don't know why." This would be the first of three incidents where the two cars made contact. The race restarted on lap 169, and McMurray and Gordon traded the lead until McMurray was pinned in the outside line and freight-trained.

Reed Sorenson brought out the fifth caution on lap 189 after spinning out in turn 2. Gordon won the race off pit road, but he and Ryan Newman were flagged for speeding off pit road and had to restart from the tail end of the field. This meant that when the race restarted on lap 206, Dale Earnhardt Jr. was leading. Two laps after the restart, the sixth caution came out when David Ragan got clipped by Alex Bowman and spun in turn 4.

The race restarted on lap 214 and Earnhardt Jr. lost the lead to Joey Logano.

The seventh caution flag flew on lap 221, in what would be the second incident between Vickers and Kahne, when Vickers turned Kahne into the turn 1 wall, presumably as payback for the earlier incident on lap 160. Brad Keselowski was caught in the melee too, but suffered little, if any, damage.

The race restarted on lap 227, but the eighth caution came out a lap later when Matt Kenseth locked up his brakes, got loose and got into Kevin Harvick in turn 1. "The good thing about this format is you have two more weeks and two race tracks that we can win on," Harvick said. "Everybody was so worried about us starting in the back (because of a poor qualifying effort) and we wrecked at the front." "He won't win this championship," Harvick said of Kenseth. "If we don't, he won't." "I totally understand how he feels," Kenseth said of Harvick. "He knows it's a mistake, but it doesn't help him. He got taken out of the race for being in the wrong place at the wrong time."

The race restarted on lap 239 with Logano still leading. The ninth caution came out on lap 255 when a plastic Ford grille plate was spotted in turn 1. Justin Allgaier stayed out when the leaders pitted and assumed the lead. The race restarted on lap 261 and Tony Stewart took the lead. He led for fourteen laps before Logano reassumed the lead.

The tenth caution flag flew on lap 277 for the third case of contact between Kahne and Vickers. NASCAR issued a warning to the crew chiefs of both drivers to cease the antics.

The race restarted on lap 283. Denny Hamlin took the lead on lap 291. The eleventh caution flag came out on lap 294 when Martin Truex Jr. clipped Danica Patrick going into turn 2. Earnhardt Jr. stayed out when the leaders pitted and assumed the lead. The race restarted on lap 300. Kurt Busch took the lead on lap 314. He led for 21 laps before Gordon took the lead, after rallying all the way back from his speeding penalty. On lap 359, Denny Hamlin retook the lead.

The twelfth caution flag came out on lap 387 when Reed Sorenson blew a right-front tire and slammed the wall in turn 1.

The race restarted on lap 394. Debris on the front stretch brought out the 13th caution on lap 418. Clint Bowyer won the race off pit road to take the lead. After pit stops, Kurt Busch's engine blew up while running seventh on the backstretch, prompting an extended yellow flag to allow crews to clean up oil spilled by Busch's car.

The race ultimately restarted with 67 laps to go. Three laps later, the 14th caution came out for a massive crash on the front straightaway. It started when Brad Keselowski lost an axle. As he tried to move out of the way, he got rear-ended by Casey Mears. A group of cars including Kasey Kahne, Martin Truex Jr., Danica Patrick and Carl Edwards was collected. A ten-minute 47 second red flag ensued to allow for cleanup. The race restarted with 58 laps to go.

Dale Earnhardt Jr. took back the lead with 47 laps to go.

Caution flew for the 15th time with twelve laps to go after Kyle Larson made contact with Marcos Ambrose trying to take the spot. The red flag was displayed for the second time of the race. Tony Stewart stayed out when the leaders pitted and assumed the lead.

Dale Earnhardt Jr. took the lead from Stewart with four laps to go and held off a hard charging Jeff Gordon to score his first career win at Martinsville Speedway. "Oh, man, been trying to win here for so many years," Earnhardt said. "Real emotional win. I can't believe we won here. We're going to drink a lot of beer tonight. It's a real emotional win. This team on pit road was great and Steve (Letarte, crew chief) and the guys did a real good job all day. They gave me a great shot at it there with the call at the end to take tires. I can't believe we won here. This means so much to all of us. It's just real emotional." "That means so much to Hendrick Motorsports," Gordon said. "That's the best way you can possibly pay tribute to those that we lost 10 years ago. To have a 1-2 finish, that's pretty awesome. I would have loved to have gotten that win to move on to Homestead, but this is certainly a great start for us." "I thought we had the car to beat," Gordon said. "Those last couple of laps were just wild. This means so much to Hendrick Motorsports. It's the best way to pay tribute to everyone we lost 10 years ago. I would have loved to get that win to move on to Homestead. But I'm real happy for Dale. I know this means so much to him." "We struggled a little bit with the balance all day long, being really, really tight, like really, really tight," said Ryan Newman. "The guys did a good job of adjusting it. Kept getting it better and better. Still never really got it right. But the strategy of two tires there at the end worked out good for us. Right number of laps with the guys that stayed out, kept the guys behind us that had four tires." "I'm really surprised that we made it to the end without another caution," he continued. "The guys that were out front there with no tires, it was really just a replay. At least had the anticipation of it to be a replay of the race I won when I took tires a few years ago. We were fortunate to make it up from eighth to third there. Had a pretty good restart. Got down to the bottom when I needed to. Those guys were kind of all jumbled up. I got into the back of Clint (Bowyer) a little bit there. I apologize to him. But I had the 22 (Joey Logano) pushing me all the way through the corner. I don't know there was a whole lot I could have done any different. In the end it was a crazy restart at Martinsville, which we all expected."

== Race results ==
Pos	No.	Driver	Team	Manufacturer	Laps	Points
1	88	Dale Earnhardt Jr.	Hendrick Motorsports	Chevrolet	500	47
2	24	Jeff Gordon	Hendrick Motorsports	Chevrolet	500	44
3	31	Ryan Newman	Richard Childress Racing	Chevrolet	500	41
4	14	Tony Stewart	Stewart–Haas Racing	Chevrolet	500	41
5	22	Joey Logano	Team Penske	Ford	500	40
6	20	Matt Kenseth	Joe Gibbs Racing	Toyota	500	39
7	15	Clint Bowyer	Michael Waltrip Racing	Toyota	500	38
8	11	Denny Hamlin	Joe Gibbs Racing	Toyota	500	37
9	47	A. J. Allmendinger	JTG Daugherty Racing	Chevrolet	500	35
10	34	David Ragan	Front Row Motorsports	Ford	500	34
11	18	Kyle Busch	Joe Gibbs Racing	Toyota	500	33
12	3	Austin Dillon (R)	Richard Childress Racing	Chevrolet	500	32
13	16	Greg Biffle	Roush Fenway Racing	Ford	500	31
14	27	Paul Menard	Richard Childress Racing	Chevrolet	500	30
15	17	Ricky Stenhouse Jr.	Roush Fenway Racing	Ford	500	29
16	1	Jamie McMurray	Chip Ganassi Racing	Chevrolet	500	29
17	51	Justin Allgaier (R)	HScott Motorsports	Chevrolet	500	28
18	26	Cole Whitt (R)	BK Racing	Toyota	500	26
19	40	Landon Cassill	Hillman–Circle Sport	Chevrolet	500	0
20	99	Carl Edwards	Roush Fenway Racing	Ford	500	24
21	43	Aric Almirola	Richard Petty Motorsports	Ford	500	23
22	38	David Gilliland	Front Row Motorsports	Ford	500	23
23	9	Marcos Ambrose	Richard Petty Motorsports	Ford	499	21
24	7	Michael Annett (R)	Tommy Baldwin Racing	Chevrolet	499	20
25	98	Josh Wise	Phil Parsons Racing	Chevrolet	499	19
26	66	Mike Wallace	Identity Ventures Racing	Toyota	499	0
27	55	Brian Vickers	Michael Waltrip Racing	Toyota	496	17
28	32	Kyle Fowler	Go FAS Racing	Ford	491	0
29	23	Alex Bowman (R)	BK Racing	Toyota	490	15
30	42	Kyle Larson (R)	Chip Ganassi Racing	Chevrolet	487	14
31	2	Brad Keselowski	Team Penske	Ford	472	13
32	48	Jimmie Johnson	Hendrick Motorsports	Chevrolet	459	12
33	4	Kevin Harvick	Stewart–Haas Racing	Chevrolet	457	11
34	10	Danica Patrick	Stewart–Haas Racing	Chevrolet	451	10
35	36	Reed Sorenson	Tommy Baldwin Racing	Chevrolet	442	9
36	41	Kurt Busch	Stewart–Haas Racing	Chevrolet	438	9
37	13	Casey Mears	Germain Racing	Chevrolet	436	7
38	78	Martin Truex Jr.	Furniture Row Racing	Chevrolet	436	6
39	83	J. J. Yeley	BK Racing	Toyota	436	0
40	5	Kasey Kahne	Hendrick Motorsports	Chevrolet	403	4
41	33	Travis Kvapil	Hillman–Circle Sport	Chevrolet	280	3
42	44	Timmy Hill	Team XTREME Racing	Chevrolet	30	2
43	93	Clay Rogers	BK Racing	Toyota	25	1

=== Race summary ===
- 24 lead changes among different drivers
- 15 cautions for 105 laps, 2 red flags for 19 minutes 38 seconds
- Time of race: 3:43:07
- Dale Earnhardt Jr. won his fourth race of the 2014 season

=== Standings after the race ===
Drivers with highlighted boxes are drivers currently in the Chase at this point.

Drivers' Championship standings

	Pos	Driver	Points
6	1	Jeff Gordon	4,044
1	2	Ryan Newman	4,041 (-3)
2	3	Joey Logano	4,040 (-4)
1	4	Matt Kenseth	4,039 (-5)
1	5	Denny Hamlin	4,037 (-7)
	6	Carl Edwards	4,024 (-20)
1	7	Brad Keselowski	4,013 (-31)
6	8	Kevin Harvick	4,011 (-33)
	9	Kyle Busch	2,230 (-1,814)
2	10	A. J. Allmendinger	2,198 (-1,846)
2	11	Dale Earnhardt Jr.	2,196 (-1,848)
2	12	Jimmie Johnson	2,186 (-1,858)
1	13	Greg Biffle	2,178 (-1,866)
3	14	Kasey Kahne	2,173 (-1,871)
	15	Kurt Busch	2,155 (-1,889)
	16	Aric Almirola	2,124 (-1,920)

Manufacturers' Championship standings

Pos	Manufacturer	Points
1	Chevrolet	1,476
2	Ford	1,448 (-28)
3	Toyota	1,325 (-151)

- Note: Only the first sixteen positions are included for the driver standings.

Previous race: 2014 GEICO 500	Sprint Cup Series; 2014 season	Next race: 2014 AAA Texas 500
