= Identity Ventures Racing =

Former NASCAR team

- Owner(s): Jay Robinson; Nat Hardwick; Mark Bailey; James Hamilton
- Base: Monroe, North Carolina
- Series: Sprint Cup Series
- Race drivers: 66. Michael Waltrip; Joe Nemechek; Jeff Burton; Brett Moffitt; Tomy Drissi; Timmy Hill; Mike Wallace; 49. Mike Wallace
- Manufacturer: Toyota
- Opened: 2014
- Closed: 2014

Career
- Debut: 2014 Daytona 500 (Daytona)
- Latest race: 2014 Ford EcoBoost 400 (Homestead)
- Races competed: 34
- Drivers' Championships: 0
- Race victories: 0
- Pole positions: 0

Identity Ventures Racing was an American professional stock car racing team that last competed in the NASCAR Sprint Cup Series. The team was founded by Identity Ventures owners James Hamilton and Mark Bailey, Atlanta-based investor Nat Hardwick and Jay Robinson, longtime owner of a Nationwide Series team. IVR formed before the 2014 NASCAR season, and was run out of Robinson's Nationwide Series shop. The team operated as a satellite team of Michael Waltrip Racing to handling that organization's research-and-development operations, using the equipment of Joe Nemechek, one of the team's drivers. Following lawsuits against Hardwick in August and September 2014, his ownership stake in the team passed back to Hamilton, Bailey and Robinson. The team folded after one season, and Robinson moved the equipment and owner's points to his own team, now known as Premium Motorsports.

== Car No. 66 History ==
The No. 66 was originally the No. 56 for Michael Waltrip Racing; its current incarnation had its beginnings in an incident during the 2013 Federated Auto Parts 400 at Richmond International Raceway, in which MWR was charged with fixing the outcome of the race to get Martin Truex Jr. into the Chase for the Sprint Cup. As a result, Truex was booted from the Chase, sponsor NAPA Auto Parts left the team for JR Motorsports, while Truex departed for Furniture Row Racing. This left MWR's No. 56 team without a driver or sponsor for 2014.

=== 2014 ===
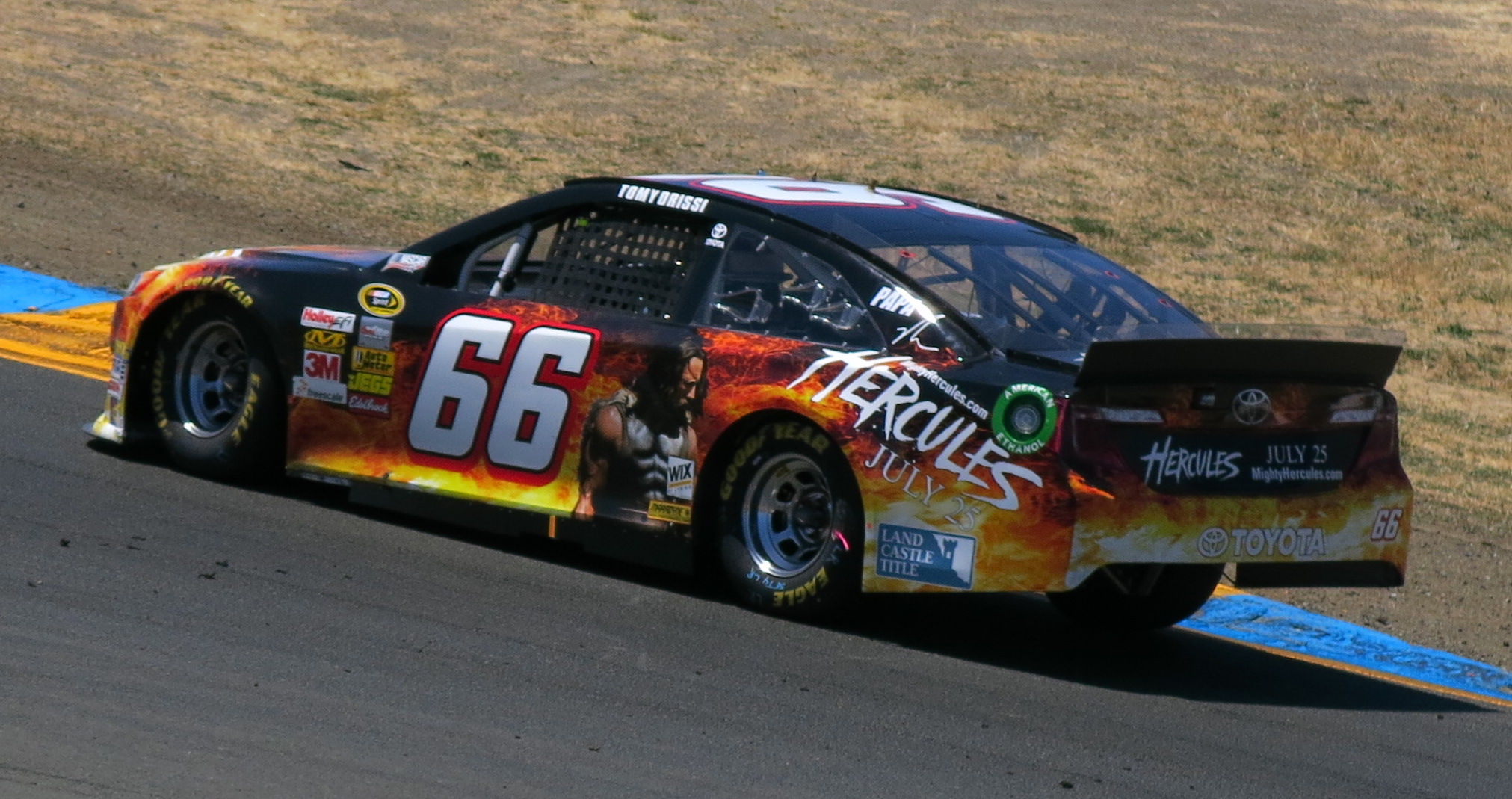
Tomy Drissi driving the 66 at Sonoma Raceway in 2014

For 2014, MWR initially planned to run a part-time car out of their shop for owner Michael Waltrip and veteran Jeff Burton. However, on January 30, 2014, MWR announced a deal with team owner Jay Robinson, spinning off the No. 66 into a satellite team. Identity Ventures Racing was formed when Robinson partnered with the two owners of Identity Ventures and Atlanta-based Nat Hardwick. Joe Nemechek's Toyota Camry fleet was purchased by IVR in preparation for the MWR alliance, and in return Nemechek was named the team's primary driver. Burton only ended up running two races in the car, with MWR development driver Brett Moffitt taking over most of Burton's schedule. One of Nemechek's starts was replaced by another young driver, Timmy Hill, while Nemechek ran the truck race in Texas. At the Sonoma road course, Tomy Drissi ran the car as a road course ringer. Mike Wallace ran several fall races after Nemechek left the team. Waltrip ran all four restrictor plate races.

The team fielded three different types of efforts in 2014. For some races, Identity fielded the car with limited MWR support. This was the case for all of Nemechek's races and Drissi's road course start. For certain other races, Identity fielded the car out of their own shop but with strong MWR support. These included Moffitt's first race in the car, and Waltrip's third race. Finally, the car was fielded out of the MWR shop for some races, but still using Identity's equipment and points. These included Waltrip's first two starts, Burton's two starts, and Moffitt's second and third starts.

Sponsorship of the team had included PEAK Motor Oil, Farm Bureau Insurance, Testroil, Vydox, myAFIBstory.com, Royal Teak Collection and others. However, the team's primary sponsor for most of the season was Landcastle Title, a real-estate title firm owned by team investor Nat Hardwick. However, it was not a major sponsorship, and as a result, most of the races were run unsponsored. Some of Hardwick's other companies also appeared on the car, including Morris-Hardwick-Schneider, Smart Ben and the Dustin Johnson Foundation. The team's sponsorship, as well as Hardwick's role in the organization was put into question when he was fired from many of these companies in late August, and was embroiled in numerous lawsuits alleging that he misappropriated over $30 million in company funds. Although Identity Ventures executives still owned the team, this ended the primary sponsorship from Hardwick's companies. At Atlanta in September, when the story broke, the Morris-Hardwick-Schneider paint scheme was stripped from the car after qualifying, with Brett Moffitt driving a blank blue car in the race. The team was forced to rely on its secondary partners for sponsorship for the rest of the season, while picking up additional backing from several southeast law firms. Nonetheless, the team was forced to run several races without sponsorship that had been scheduled to be sponsored by Hardwick.

Nemechek's best finish in the car was 30th at Watkins Glen, while failing to qualify at Texas in April. Burton's best finish was 17th, coming at Las Vegas. Waltrip had a best run of 16th at the October Talladega race. Wallace had a best of 26th at the fall Martinsville race. Meanwhile, Moffitt has a best finish of 22nd in his debut at Dover, while failing to qualify at Indianapolis.

Identity Ventures Racing sold the team after its first season. The owner points were transferred to the reconstituted Jay Robinson team, now known as Premium Motorsports.

=== Car No. 66 results ===
NASCAR Sprint Cup Series results
Year	Driver	No.	Make	1	2	3	4	5	6	7	8	9	10	11	12	13	14	15	16	17	18	19	20	21	22	23	24	25	26	27	28	29	30	31	32	33	34	35	36	Owners	Pts
2014	Michael Waltrip	66	Toyota	DAY; 41									TAL; 25								DAY; 19														TAL; 16					39th	357
2014	Joe Nemechek	66	Toyota		PHO; 40		BRI; 41	CAL; 32	MAR; 43	TEX; DNQ	DAR; 34	RCH; 37		KAN; 31	CLT; 34					KEN; 38				POC; 40	GLN; 30	MCH; 35			RCH; 40	CHI; 36										39th	357
2014	Jeff Burton	66	Toyota			LVS; 17																NHA; 20																		39th	357
2014	Brett Moffitt	66	Toyota													DOV; 22		MCH; 34					IND; DNQ				BRI; 42	ATL; 34						CLT; 40			TEX; 40		HOM; 36	39th	357
2014	Timmy Hill	66	Toyota														POC; 36																							39th	357
2014	Tomy Drissi	66	Toyota																SON; 38																					39th	357
2014	Mike Wallace	66	Toyota																												NHA; 34	DOV; 40	KAN; 34			MAR; 26		PHO; 36		39th	357

== See also ==
- NEMCO Motorsports
- Michael Waltrip Racing
- Premium Motorsports / Jay Robinson Racing
