= Alex Kennedy (racing driver) =

American racing driver (born 1992)

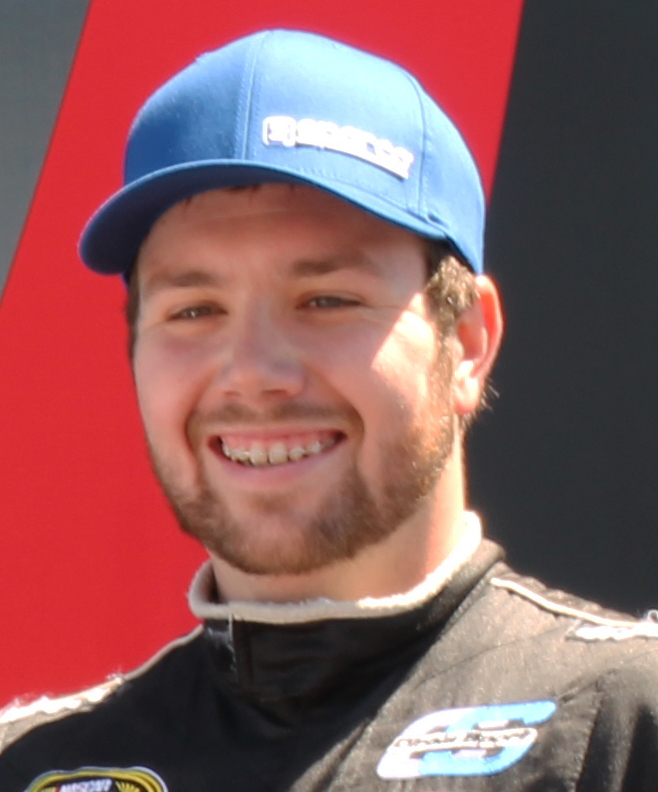
- Kennedy at the 2015 Toyota/Save Mart 350
- Born: February 2, 1992 (age 34); Aztec, New Mexico, U.S.

NASCAR Cup Series career
- 22 races run over 4 years
- 2016 position: 50th
- Best finish: 40th (2015)
- First race: 2013 Toyota/Save Mart 350 (Sonoma)
- Last race: 2016 Cheez-It 355 at The Glen (Watkins Glen)
Wins	Top tens	Poles
0	0	0

NASCAR O'Reilly Auto Parts Series career
- 16 races run over 5 years
- 2016 position: 114th
- Best finish: 50th (2011)
- First race: 2010 Bucyrus 200 (Road America)
- Last race: 2016 Road America 180 (Road America)
Wins	Top tens	Poles
0	0	0
- Statistics up to date as of August 27, 2016.

Alex Kennedy (born February 2, 1992) is an American former professional stock car racing driver.

== Racing career ==
After starting in Legends car racing, Kennedy returned to win the 2009 Legends Road Course World Finals.

=== NASCAR ===
As a sixteen-year-old in 2008, Kennedy ran occasional races in a variety of national touring series; ARCA, NASCAR K&N Pro Series West, and the NASCAR K&N Pro Series East. In 2009, he ran full-time in the NASCAR K&N Pro Series East and finished tenth in the season points with three top-tens and one top-five finish. He made his first Nationwide Series start in 2010, racing in six races, primarily on road courses. He raced in five Nationwide races in the following year with a top finish of 21st. At Dover that year, Kennedy became involved in a controversial incident, where his car pulled across the track when attempting to rejoin the field after an accident and hit the car of Kevin Swindell.

Kennedy made his Sprint Cup Series debut in the 2013 Toyota/Save Mart 350 at Sonoma Raceway for Humphrey Smith Racing. Kennedy was the first New Mexico native to compete in a Sprint Cup race since Al Unser Jr. qualified for the 1993 Daytona 500. Kennedy also competed for Humphrey Smith Racing later in the year at Pocono Raceway and Watkins Glen International.

Kennedy ran a number of Cup races in 2014 for Circle Sport Racing. He returned to Circle Sport for 2015, also declaring for Rookie of the Year. With his team closing down due to the charter system, he left with no ride for the 2016 season. He was later picked up by Premium Motorsports to drive the No. 55 Chevrolet at Watkins Glen. He has not raced in NASCAR since.

== Images ==
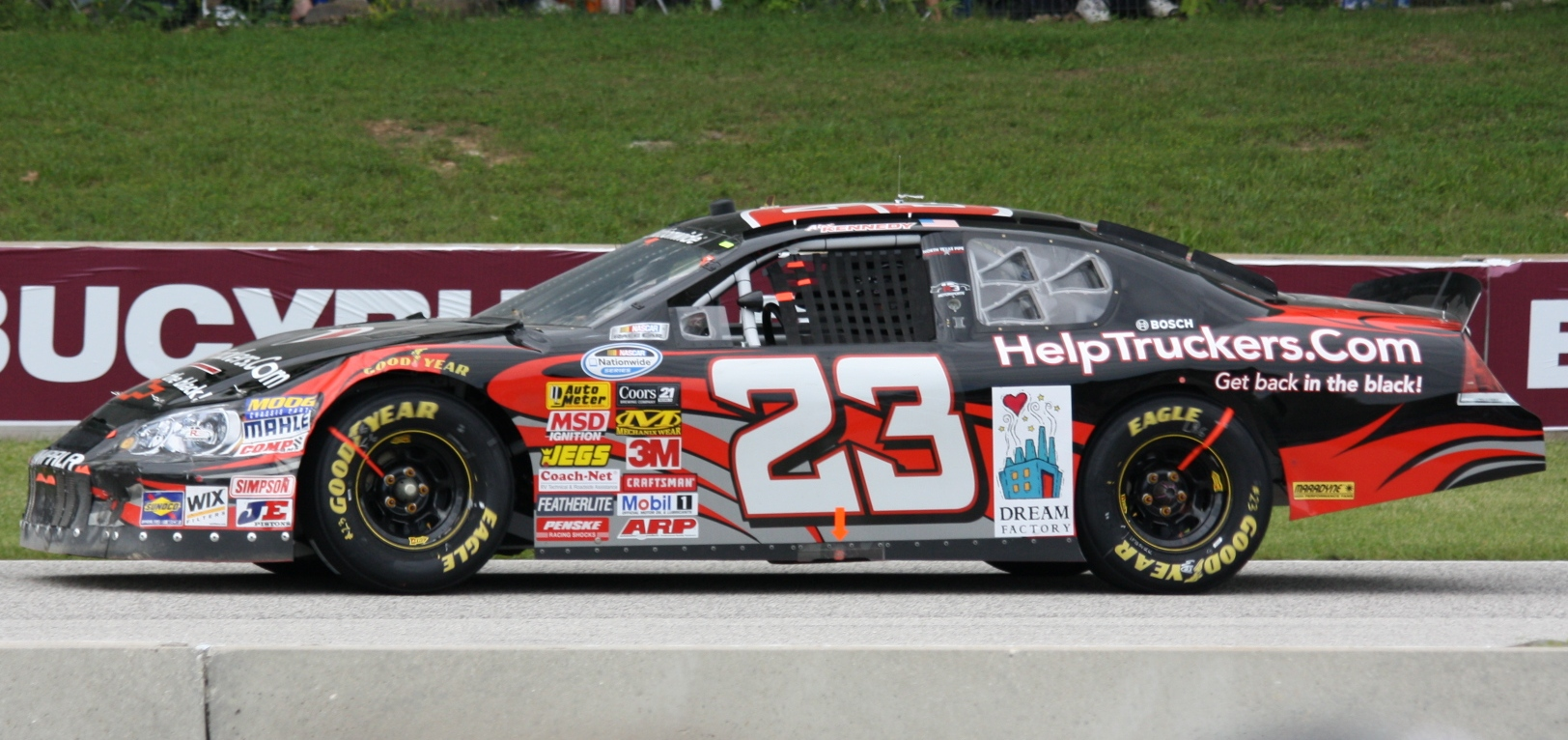
2010 Nationwide car at Road America

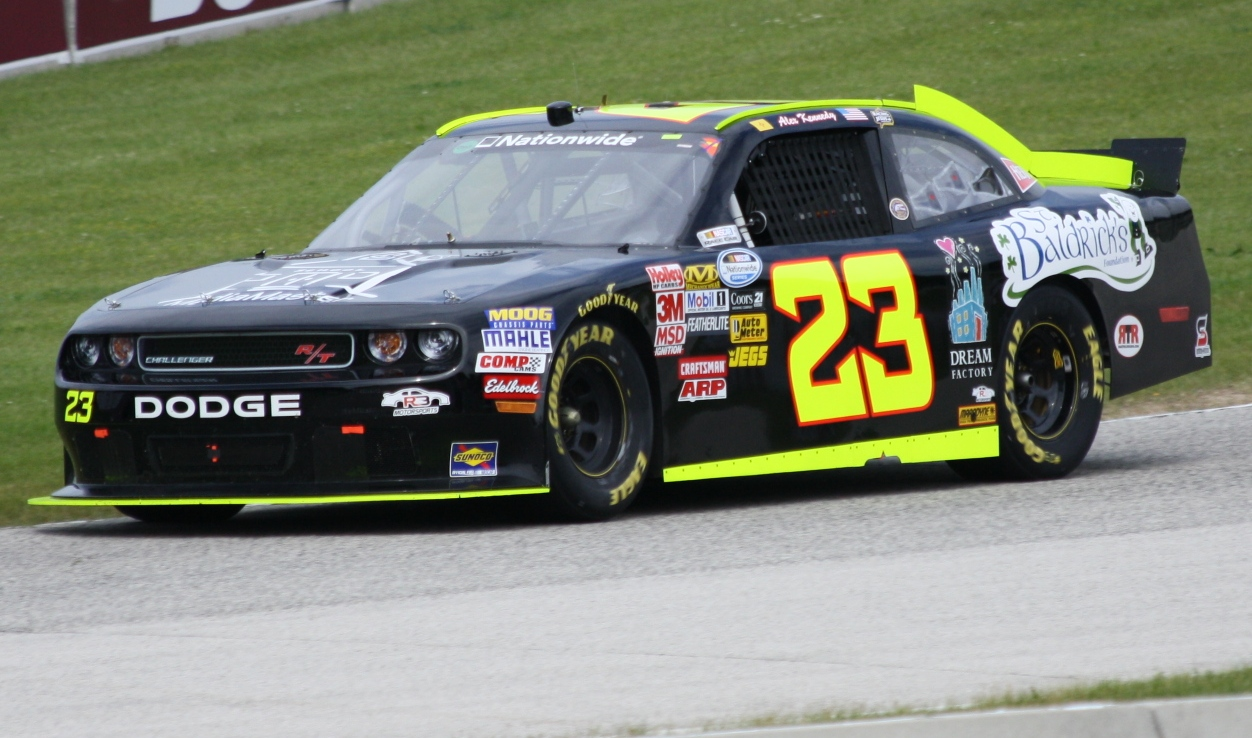
2011 Nationwide car

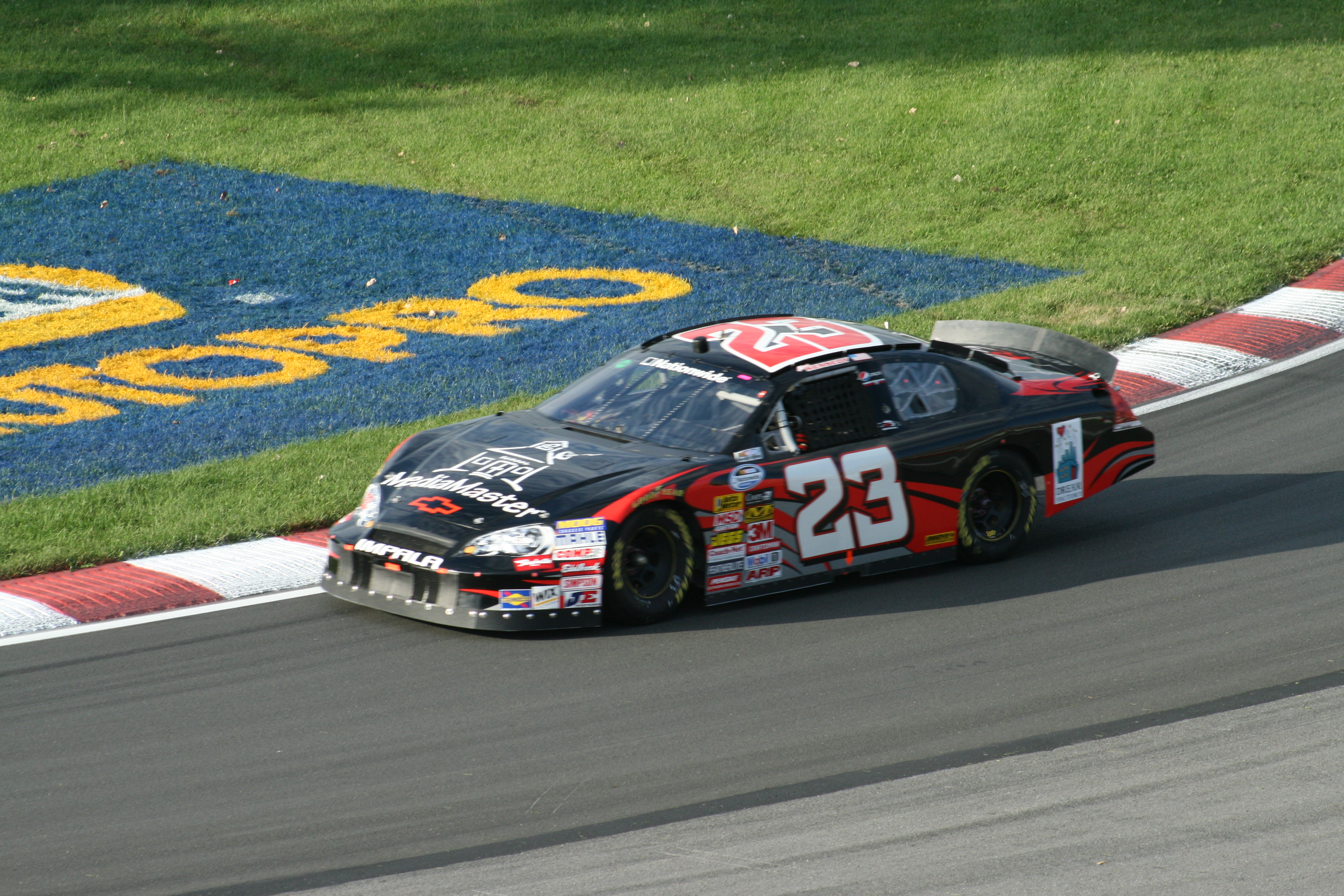
Kennedy at Circuit Gilles Villeneuve

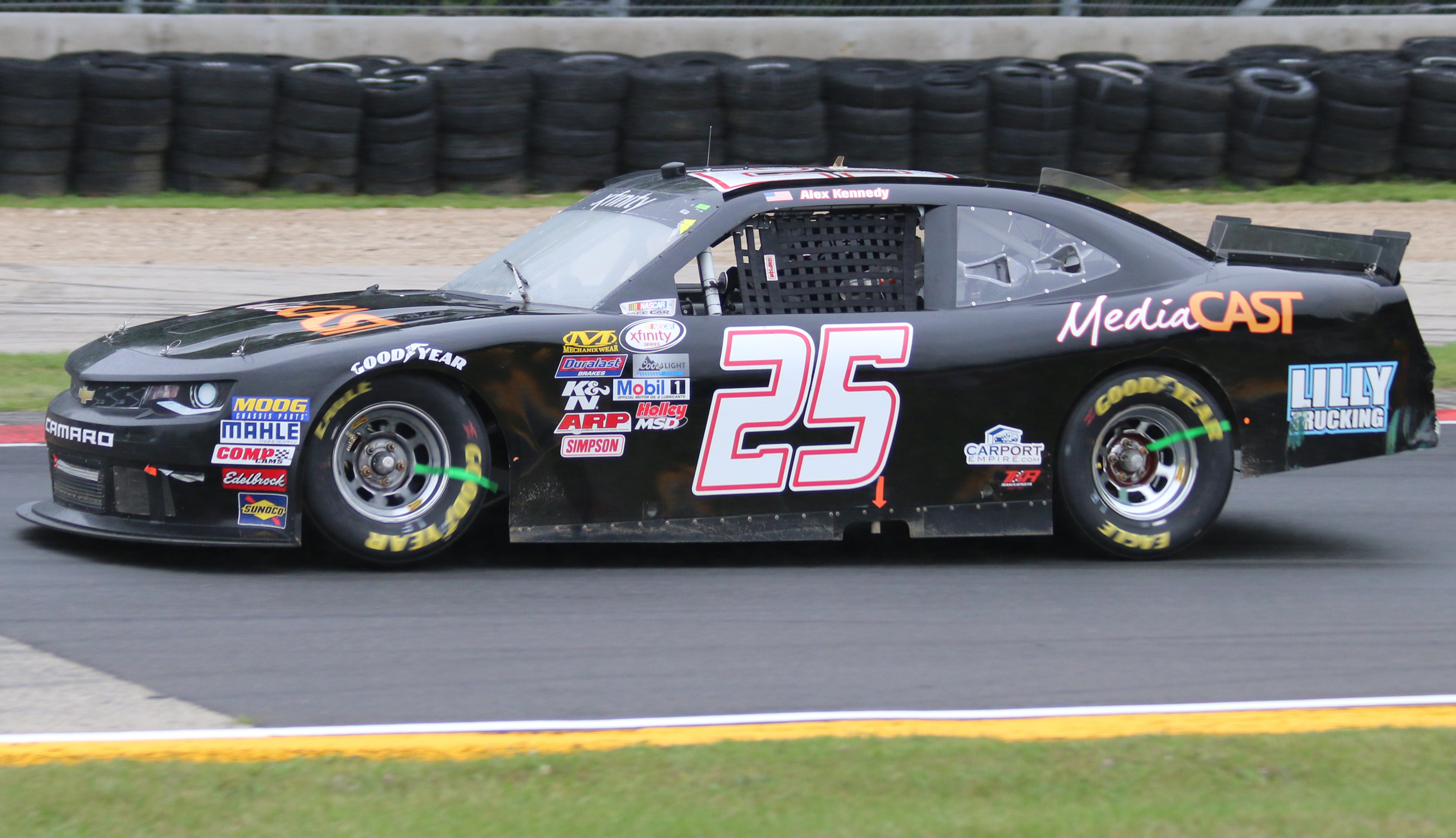
Kennedy's No. 25 at Road America in 2016

== Motorsports career results ==
=== NASCAR ===
(key) (Bold – Pole position awarded by qualifying time. Italics – Pole position earned by points standings or practice time. * – Most laps led.)

==== Sprint Cup Series ====
NASCAR Sprint Cup Series results
Year	Team	No.	Make	1	2	3	4	5	6	7	8	9	10	11	12	13	14	15	16	17	18	19	20	21	22	23	24	25	26	27	28	29	30	31	32	33	34	35	36	NSCC	Pts	Ref
2013	Humphrey Smith Racing	19	Toyota	DAY	PHO	LVS	BRI	CAL	MAR	TEX	KAN	RCH	TAL	DAR	CLT	DOV	POC	MCH	SON; 40	KEN	DAY	NHA	IND	POC; 42	GLN; 29	MCH	BRI	ATL	RCH	CHI	NHA	DOV	KAN	CLT	TAL	MAR	TEX	PHO	HOM	45th	21	
2014	Circle Sport	33	Chevy	DAY	PHO	LVS	BRI	CAL	MAR	TEX	DAR	RCH	TAL	KAN	CLT	DOV	POC; 39	MCH	SON; 39	KEN	DAY	NHA	IND	POC; 28	GLN; 33	MCH; 34	BRI	ATL	RCH	CHI	NHA	DOV	KAN	CLT	TAL	MAR	TEX	PHO	HOM	49th	47	
2015	Circle Sport	33	Chevy	DAY	ATL	LVS	PHO; 38	CAL	MAR; 33	TEX; 37	BRI; 33	RCH; 39	TAL	KAN	CLT; 36	DOV	POC	MCH	SON; 25	DAY	KEN; 40	NHA	IND	POC; 38	GLN; 28	MCH	BRI	DAR	RCH	CHI	NHA	DOV; 38	CLT; 34	KAN	TAL	MAR; 33	TEX	PHO	HOM	40th	120	
2016	Premium Motorsports	55	Chevy	DAY	ATL	LVS	PHO	CAL	MAR	TEX	BRI	RCH	TAL	KAN	DOV	CLT	POC	MCH	SON	DAY	KEN	NHA	IND	POC	GLN; 36	BRI	MCH	DAR	RCH	CHI	NHA	DOV	CLT	KAN	TAL	MAR	TEX	PHO	HOM	50th	5	

==== Xfinity Series ====
NASCAR Xfinity Series results
Year	Team	No.	Make	1	2	3	4	5	6	7	8	9	10	11	12	13	14	15	16	17	18	19	20	21	22	23	24	25	26	27	28	29	30	31	32	33	34	35	NXSC	Pts	Ref
2010	R3 Motorsports	23	Chevy	DAY	CAL	LVS	BRI	NSH	PHO	TEX	TAL	RCH	DAR	DOV	CLT	NSH	KEN	ROA; 28	NHA	DAY	CHI	GTY; 24	IRP	IOW	GLN; 16	MCH	BRI	CGV; 26	ATL	RCH	DOV	KAN	CAL	CLT	GTY				67th	531	
2010	Baker Curb Racing	27	Ford																																	TEX; 31	PHO	HOM; 24	67th	531	
2011	R3 Motorsports	03	Dodge	DAY	PHO	LVS	BRI	CAL; 40	TEX	TAL	NSH	RCH	DAR																										50th	71	
2011	R3 Motorsports	23	Dodge											DOV; 32	IOW	CLT	CHI	MCH	ROA; 21	DAY	KEN	NHA	NSH	IRP	IOW														50th	71	
2011	R3 Motorsports	23	Chevy																							GLN; 23	CGV; 33	BRI	ATL	RCH	CHI	DOV	KAN	CLT	TEX	PHO	HOM		50th	71	
2012	NEMCO Motorsports	87	Toyota	DAY	PHO	LVS	BRI	CAL	TEX	RCH	TAL	DAR	IOW	CLT	DOV	MCH	ROA; 33	KEN	DAY	NHA	CHI	IND	IOW	GLN; 29	CGV; 15	BRI	ATL	RCH	CHI	KEN	DOV	CLT	KAN	TEX	PHO	HOM			59th	56	
2013	SR² Motorsports	24	Toyota	DAY	PHO	LVS	BRI	CAL	TEX	RCH	TAL	DAR	CLT	DOV	IOW	MCH	ROA	KEN	DAY	NHA	CHI	IND	IOW	GLN	MOH; 29	BRI	ATL	RCH	CHI	KEN	DOV	KAN	CLT	TEX	PHO	HOM			125th	0^{1}	
2016	Team Kapusta Racing	25	Chevy	DAY	ATL	LVS	PHO	CAL	TEX	BRI	RCH	TAL	DOV	CLT	POC	MCH	IOW	DAY	KEN	NHA	IND	IOW	GLN	MOH	BRI	ROA; 20	DAR	RCH	CHI	KEN	DOV	CLT	KAN	TEX	PHO	HOM			114th	0^{1}	

^{*} Season still in progress
^{1} Ineligible for series points

==== K&N Pro Series East ====
NASCAR K&N Pro Series East results
Year	Team	No.	Make	1	2	3	4	5	6	7	8	9	10	11	12	13	14	NKNPSEC	Pts	Ref
2008	Spraker Racing Enterprises	37	Chevy	GRE	IOW	SBO; 32	GLN	NHA	TMP; 20	MCM	ADI	LRP; 10	MFD	NHA; 34	DOV; 28	STA		28th	444	
2009	Spraker Racing Enterprises	37	Chevy	GRE; 17	TRI; 14	IOW; 6	SBO; 20	GLN; 8	NHA; 15	TMP; 22	ADI; 20	LRP; 4	NHA; 13	DOV; 23				10th	1324	
2010	Spraker Racing Enterprises	37	Chevy	GRE	SBO	IOW	MAR	NHA	LRP	LEE	JFC	NHA	DOV; 11					61st	130	
2012	Spraker Racing Enterprises	37	Toyota	BRI	GRE	RCH	IOW	BGS	JFC	LGY	CNB	COL	IOW; 19	NHA	DOV	GRE	CAR	68th	25	
2013	Spraker Racing Enterprises	37	Chevy	BRI	GRE	FIF	RCH	BGS	IOW	LGY	COL	IOW	VIR; 10	GRE	NHA	DOV	RAL; 13	37th	65	

==== K&N Pro Series West ====
NASCAR K&N Pro Series West results
Year	Team	No.	Make	1	2	3	4	5	6	7	8	9	10	11	12	13	14	NKNPSWC	Pts	Ref
2008	Tom Clark	23	Ford	AAS	PHO	CTS	IOW	CNS	SON; 11	IRW	DCS	EVG	MMP	IRW	AMP	AAS		56th	130	
2009	Spraker Racing Enterprises	37	Chevy	CTS	AAS	PHO	MAD	IOW	DCS	SON; 30	IRW	PIR	MMP	CNS	IOW	AAS		68th	73	
2011	GSR Racing	07	Ford	PHO; 32	AAS	MMP	IOW	LVS	SON	IRW	EVG	PIR	CNS	MRP	SPO	AAS	PHO	89th	67	

=== ARCA Racing Series ===
(key) (Bold – Pole position awarded by qualifying time. Italics – Pole position earned by points standings or practice time. * – Most laps led.)

ARCA Racing Series results
Year	Team	No.	Make	1	2	3	4	5	6	7	8	9	10	11	12	13	14	15	16	17	18	19	20	ARSC	Pts	Ref
2010	Capital City Motorsports	38	Dodge	DAY	PBE	SLM	TEX; 19	TAL; 29	TOL	POC	MCH	IOW	MFD	POC	BLN	NJE	ISF	CHI	DSF	TOL	SLM	KAN	CAR	80th	220	
2012	Spraker Racing Enterprises	08	Ford	DAY; 9	MOB	SLM	TAL	TOL	ELK	POC	MCH	WIN	NJE	IOW	CHI	IRP	POC	BLN	ISF	MAD	SLM	DSF	KAN	95th	185	
