= 2014 Pure Michigan 400 =

Race details
- Race 23 of 36 in the 2014 NASCAR Sprint Cup Series
- Michigan International Speedway
- Date: August 17, 2014
- Location: Michigan International Speedway; Brooklyn, Michigan
- Course: Permanent racing facility
- Course length: 2.0 miles (3.2 km)
- Distance: 200 laps, 400 mi (640 km)
- Weather: Cloudy with a temperature of 71 °F (22 °C); wind out of the east at 5 miles per hour (8.0 km/h)
- Average speed: 141.788 mph (228.186 km/h)

Pole position
Driver	Jeff Gordon	Hendrick Motorsports
- Time: 34.857

Most laps led
Driver	Joey Logano	Team Penske
- Laps: 82

Winner
No. 24	Jeff Gordon	Hendrick Motorsports

Television in the United States
- Network: ESPN & MRN
- Announcers: Allen Bestwick, Dale Jarrett and Andy Petree (Television); Joe Moore and Jeff Striegle (Booth); Dave Moody (1 & 2) and Buddy Long (3 & 4) (Turns) (Radio)
- Nielsen ratings: 3.2/7 (Final); 3.0/7 (Overnight); 5.150 Million viewers

The 2014 Pure Michigan 400 was a NASCAR Sprint Cup Series stock car race that was held on August 17, 2014, at Michigan International Speedway in Brooklyn, Michigan. Contested over 200 laps on the 2.0-mile (3.2 km) superspeedway, it was the 23rd race of the 2014 NASCAR Sprint Cup Series. Jeff Gordon won the race, his third win of the season. Kevin Harvick finished second while Joey Logano, Paul Menard, and Dale Earnhardt Jr. rounded out the top five. The top rookies of the race were Austin Dillon (22nd), Cole Whitt (25th), and Alex Bowman (26th).

== Report ==
=== Background ===
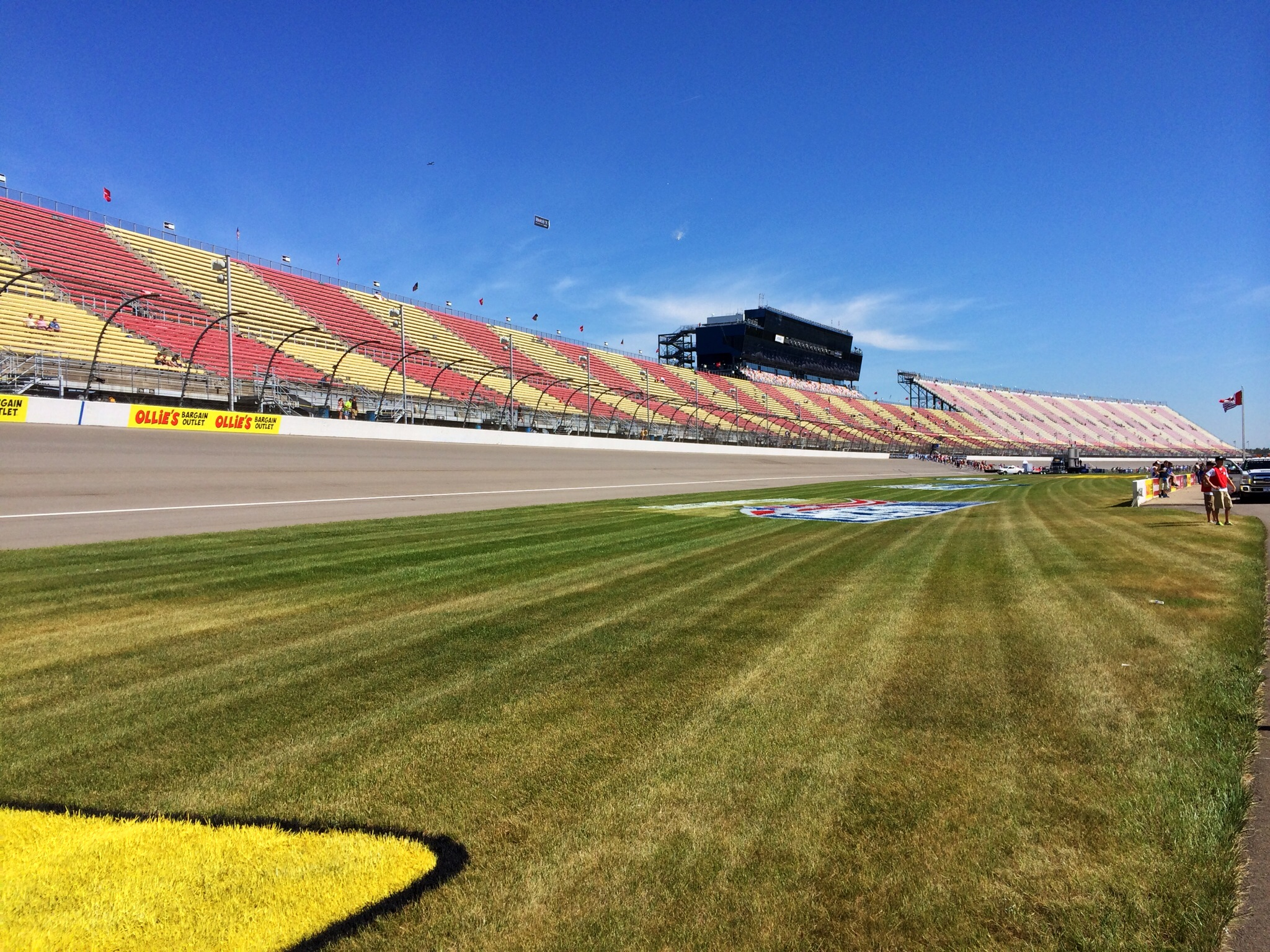
Michigan International Speedway's front stretch and infield.

The track, Michigan International Speedway, is a four-turn superspeedway that is 2 miles (3.2 km) long. Opened in 1960, the track's turns are banked at eighteen degrees, while the 3,600-foot-long front stretch, the location of the finish line, is banked at twelve degrees. The back stretch, has a five degree banking and is 2,242 feet long. Michigan International Speedway has a grandstand seating capacity of 84,000 people. Joey Logano was the defending race winner from the 2013 race.

Following the events at Canandaigua Motorsports Park, Tony Stewart sat out the previous week's race at Watkins Glen and on August 14, Stewart–Haas Racing announced that Stewart would sit out Michigan and that Jeff Burton would drive in his place.

==== New rules and regulations ====
On the Friday before the race, NASCAR vice president of competition and racing development Robin Pemberton announced an amendment to the rules in response to Kevin Ward Jr.'s death at Canandaigua Motorsports Park. Pemberton stated that NASCAR were "formalizing rules that have been there", and that the new rule would be referred to, in section 9-16 (On-Track Incident Procedures) of the NASCAR Rulebook:

Per the rules, if a racecar is involved in an on-track incident and/or is stopped on or near the racing surface and unable to return to pit road, unless extenuating emergency conditions exist with the racecar (i.e. fire, smoke in cockpit, etc.) the driver should take the following steps:

- Shut off the electrical power and drop the window net to signal to safety crews that they are OK
- Do not loosen, disconnect or remove any driver personal safety equipment until directed to do so by safety personnel or a track worker
- After being directed to exit the racecar, the driver should proceed to either the ambulance, other vehicle, or as otherwise directed by safety personnel or a NASCAR/Track Official
- At no time should a driver or crew member(s) approach any portion of the racing surface or apron
- At no time should a driver or crew member(s) approach another moving vehicle

Pemberton also stated that "through time you have to recognize when you get a reminder or tap on the shoulder, something that may need to be addressed", and that "it's not just about NASCAR, but it's all of sports and motorsports that we take note in". Pemberton also noted that the penalties that would be handed down would be taken on a case-by-case basis and not a fixed one-size-fits-all penalty.

=== Entry list ===
The entry list for the Pure Michigan 400 was released on Tuesday, August 12, 2014 at 11:03 a.m. Eastern time. Forty-three drivers were entered for the race.

No.	Driver	Team	Manufacturer
1	Jamie McMurray	Chip Ganassi Racing	Chevrolet
2	Brad Keselowski (PC2)	Team Penske	Ford
3	Austin Dillon (R)	Richard Childress Racing	Chevrolet
4	Kevin Harvick	Stewart–Haas Racing	Chevrolet
5	Kasey Kahne	Hendrick Motorsports	Chevrolet
7	Michael Annett (R)	Tommy Baldwin Racing	Chevrolet
9	Marcos Ambrose	Richard Petty Motorsports	Ford
10	Danica Patrick	Stewart–Haas Racing	Chevrolet
11	Denny Hamlin	Joe Gibbs Racing	Toyota
13	Casey Mears	Germain Racing	Chevrolet
14	Jeff Burton (Note: Tony Stewart was on the entry list for the race, but sat out following the events in upstate New York. Jeff Burton drove in his place.)	Stewart–Haas Racing	Chevrolet
15	Clint Bowyer	Michael Waltrip Racing	Toyota
16	Greg Biffle	Roush Fenway Racing	Ford
17	Ricky Stenhouse Jr.	Roush Fenway Racing	Ford
18	Kyle Busch	Joe Gibbs Racing	Toyota
20	Matt Kenseth (PC4)	Joe Gibbs Racing	Toyota
21	Trevor Bayne (i)	Wood Brothers Racing	Ford
22	Joey Logano	Team Penske	Ford
23	Alex Bowman (R)	BK Racing	Toyota
24	Jeff Gordon (PC5)	Hendrick Motorsports	Chevrolet
26	Cole Whitt (R)	BK Racing	Toyota
27	Paul Menard	Richard Childress Racing	Chevrolet
31	Ryan Newman	Richard Childress Racing	Chevrolet
32	Travis Kvapil	Go FAS Racing	Ford
33	Alex Kennedy	Hillman–Circle Sport	Chevrolet
34	David Ragan	Front Row Motorsports	Ford
36	Reed Sorenson	Tommy Baldwin Racing	Chevrolet
37	Dave Blaney	Tommy Baldwin Racing	Chevrolet
38	David Gilliland	Front Row Motorsports	Ford
40	Landon Cassill (i)	Hillman–Circle Sport	Chevrolet
41	Kurt Busch (PC3)	Stewart–Haas Racing	Chevrolet
42	Kyle Larson (R)	Chip Ganassi Racing	Chevrolet
43	Aric Almirola	Richard Petty Motorsports	Ford
47	A. J. Allmendinger	JTG Daugherty Racing	Chevrolet
48	Jimmie Johnson (PC1)	Hendrick Motorsports	Chevrolet
51	Justin Allgaier (R)	HScott Motorsports	Chevrolet
55	Brian Vickers	Michael Waltrip Racing	Toyota
66	Joe Nemechek (i)	Identity Ventures Racing	Toyota
78	Martin Truex Jr.	Furniture Row Racing	Chevrolet
83	Ryan Truex (R)	BK Racing	Toyota
88	Dale Earnhardt Jr.	Hendrick Motorsports	Chevrolet
98	Josh Wise	Phil Parsons Racing	Chevrolet
99	Carl Edwards	Roush Fenway Racing	Ford
Official entry list

Key	Meaning
(R)	Rookie
(i)	Ineligible for points
(PC#)	Past champions provisional

== Practice ==
=== First practice ===
Joey Logano was the fastest in the first practice session with a time of 35.200 and a speed of 204.545 mph (329.183 km/h).

Pos	No.	Driver	Team	Manufacturer	Time	Speed
1	22	Joey Logano	Team Penske	Ford	35.200	204.545
2	99	Carl Edwards	Roush Fenway Racing	Ford	35.275	204.111
3	55	Brian Vickers	Michael Waltrip Racing	Toyota	35.308	203.920
Official first practice results

== Qualifying ==
Jeff Gordon scored his 76th career pole with a new track record time of 34.857 and a speed of 206.558 mph (332.423 km/h); the seventh fastest pole lap in NASCAR history. Gordon stated that he "knew that we were really strong here the last time we were here and what our team is doing right now it's just phenomenal how they continue to improve race cars and just the whole effort", and praised his team for his car setup as "you don't go around this place like that, that fast without a really good race car". Logano qualified on the front row for the seventh time in 2014, stating that his car was "able to get faster as the session went on which is just an awesome job by this team to give me cars like this every week that are so good and so fun to drive". Logano did express his frustration at having only one pole of the seven front row starts; expressing that his team "were close again and just weren't able to do it".

Martin Truex Jr. missed the first practice session and qualifying after Sherry Pollex, his longtime girlfriend and business partner, underwent surgery to treat her ovarian cancer. Matt Crafton filled in for him on Friday. Ryan Blaney practiced and qualified the No. 21 Ford for Wood Brothers Racing in place of Trevor Bayne, who was competing in the Nationwide Series event at Mid-Ohio. Bayne raced the car on Sunday.

=== Qualifying results ===
Pos	No.	Driver	Team	Manufacturer	R1	R2	R3
1	24	Jeff Gordon	Hendrick Motorsports	Chevrolet	35.233	34.971	34.857
2	22	Joey Logano	Team Penske	Ford	35.145	35.038	34.887
3	99	Carl Edwards	Roush Fenway Racing	Ford	35.093	35.095	34.932
4	55	Brian Vickers	Michael Waltrip Racing	Toyota	35.165	35.108	35.005
5	2	Brad Keselowski	Team Penske	Ford	35.299	35.224	35.012
6	4	Kevin Harvick	Stewart–Haas Racing	Chevrolet	35.299	35.016	35.047
7	27	Paul Menard	Richard Childress Racing	Chevrolet	35.367	35.176	35.194
8	3	Austin Dillon (R)	Richard Childress Racing	Chevrolet	35.297	35.226	35.214
9	1	Jamie McMurray	Chip Ganassi Racing	Chevrolet	35.426	35.115	35.233
10	17	Ricky Stenhouse Jr.	Roush Fenway Racing	Ford	35.168	35.276	35.264
11	16	Greg Biffle	Roush Fenway Racing	Ford	35.394	35.232	35.325
12	31	Ryan Newman	Richard Childress Racing	Chevrolet	35.427	35.182	35.386
13	42	Kyle Larson (R)	Chip Ganassi Racing	Chevrolet	35.458	35.280	—
14	10	Danica Patrick	Stewart–Haas Racing	Chevrolet	35.389	35.292	—
15	5	Kasey Kahne	Hendrick Motorsports	Chevrolet	35.314	35.304	—
16	41	Kurt Busch	Stewart–Haas Racing	Chevrolet	35.218	35.319	—
17	51	Justin Allgaier (R)	HScott Motorsports	Chevrolet	35.351	35.376	—
18	20	Matt Kenseth	Joe Gibbs Racing	Toyota	35.377	35.401	—
19	15	Clint Bowyer	Michael Waltrip Racing	Toyota	35.376	35.429	—
20	9	Marcos Ambrose	Richard Petty Motorsports	Ford	35.368	35.451	—
21	11	Denny Hamlin	Joe Gibbs Racing	Toyota	35.459	35.463	—
22	47	A. J. Allmendinger	JTG Daugherty Racing	Chevrolet	35.300	35.513	—
23	43	Aric Almirola	Richard Petty Motorsports	Ford	35.389	35.525	—
24	18	Kyle Busch	Joe Gibbs Racing	Toyota	35.401	35.649	—
25	88	Dale Earnhardt Jr.	Hendrick Motorsports	Chevrolet	35.488	—	—
26	13	Casey Mears	Germain Racing	Chevrolet	35.563	—	—
27	14	Jeff Burton	Stewart–Haas Racing	Chevrolet	35.571	—	—
28	21	Ryan Blaney (Note: Ryan Blaney qualified the car, as Trevor Bayne was competing in the Nationwide Series event at Mid-Ohio. Thus, Bayne started from the rear of the field.)	Wood Brothers Racing	Ford	35.586	—	—
29	38	David Gilliland	Front Row Motorsports	Ford	35.675	—	—
30	48	Jimmie Johnson	Hendrick Motorsports	Chevrolet	35.693	—	—
31	83	Ryan Truex (R) (Note: Ryan Truex had qualified the car and was scheduled to compete as such. After an incident in second practice, Truex suffered a concussion and was not medically cleared to race. J. J. Yeley drove in his place, and started from the rear of the field.)	BK Racing	Toyota	35.774	—	—
32	23	Alex Bowman (R)	BK Racing	Toyota	35.911	—	—
33	98	Josh Wise	Phil Parsons Racing	Chevrolet	36.044	—	—
34	34	David Ragan	Front Row Motorsports	Ford	36.084	—	—
35	7	Michael Annett (R)	Tommy Baldwin Racing	Chevrolet	36.140	—	—
36	26	Cole Whitt (R)	BK Racing	Toyota	36.157	—	—
37	37	Dave Blaney	Tommy Baldwin Racing	Chevrolet	36.391	—	—
38	32	Travis Kvapil	Go FAS Racing	Ford	36.414	—	—
39	78	Matt Crafton (Note: Matt Crafton qualified the car, as Martin Truex Jr. was not at the circuit due to his partner undergoing surgery to treat her ovarian cancer. Thus, Truex started from the rear of the field.)	Furniture Row Racing	Chevrolet	36.462	—	—
40	36	Reed Sorenson	Tommy Baldwin Racing	Chevrolet	36.536	—	—
41	33	Alex Kennedy	Hillman–Circle Sport	Chevrolet	36.767	—	—
42	66	Joe Nemechek	Identity Ventures Racing	Toyota	36.891	—	—
43	40	Landon Cassill	Hillman–Circle Sport	Chevrolet	37.104	—	—
Official qualifying results

== Practice (post-qualifying) ==
=== Second practice ===
Kevin Harvick was the fastest in the second practice session with a time of 35.436 and a speed of 203.183 mph (326.991 km/h). Ryan Truex was involved in a hard wreck seven minutes into the second practice session; he lost control of his car, overcorrected and hit the wall head on in turn two.

Pos	No.	Driver	Team	Manufacturer	Time	Speed
1	4	Kevin Harvick	Stewart–Haas Racing	Chevrolet	35.436	203.183
2	41	Kurt Busch	Stewart–Haas Racing	Chevrolet	35.449	203.109
3	24	Jeff Gordon	Hendrick Motorsports	Chevrolet	35.456	203.069
Official second practice results

=== Final practice ===
Jeff Gordon was the fastest in the final practice session with a time of 35.972 and a speed of 200.156 mph (322.120 km/h).

Pos	No.	Driver	Team	Manufacturer	Time	Speed
1	24	Jeff Gordon	Hendrick Motorsports	Chevrolet	35.972	200.156
2	42	Kyle Larson (R)	Chip Ganassi Racing	Chevrolet	36.055	199.695
3	2	Brad Keselowski	Team Penske	Ford	36.156	199.137
Official final practice results

== Race ==
=== Pre-race ===
Following his heavy practice crash, BK Racing driver Ryan Truex was taken to hospital, complaining about a headache and shoulder pain. He was later diagnosed with a concussion, and was replaced by J. J. Yeley for the race. Matt Crafton was originally slated to drive in Truex's place but he was unable to fit in the seat that was fitted for Truex. He later stated that he was "not going to take a chance", in light of his high positioning in the Camping World Truck Series points. With the driver change and a backup car – following the practice crash – Yeley started from the rear of the field. The race was scheduled to begin at 1:16 p.m. Eastern time but was delayed a few minutes to allow the Air Titans extra time to dry the race track.

=== First half ===
==== Start ====
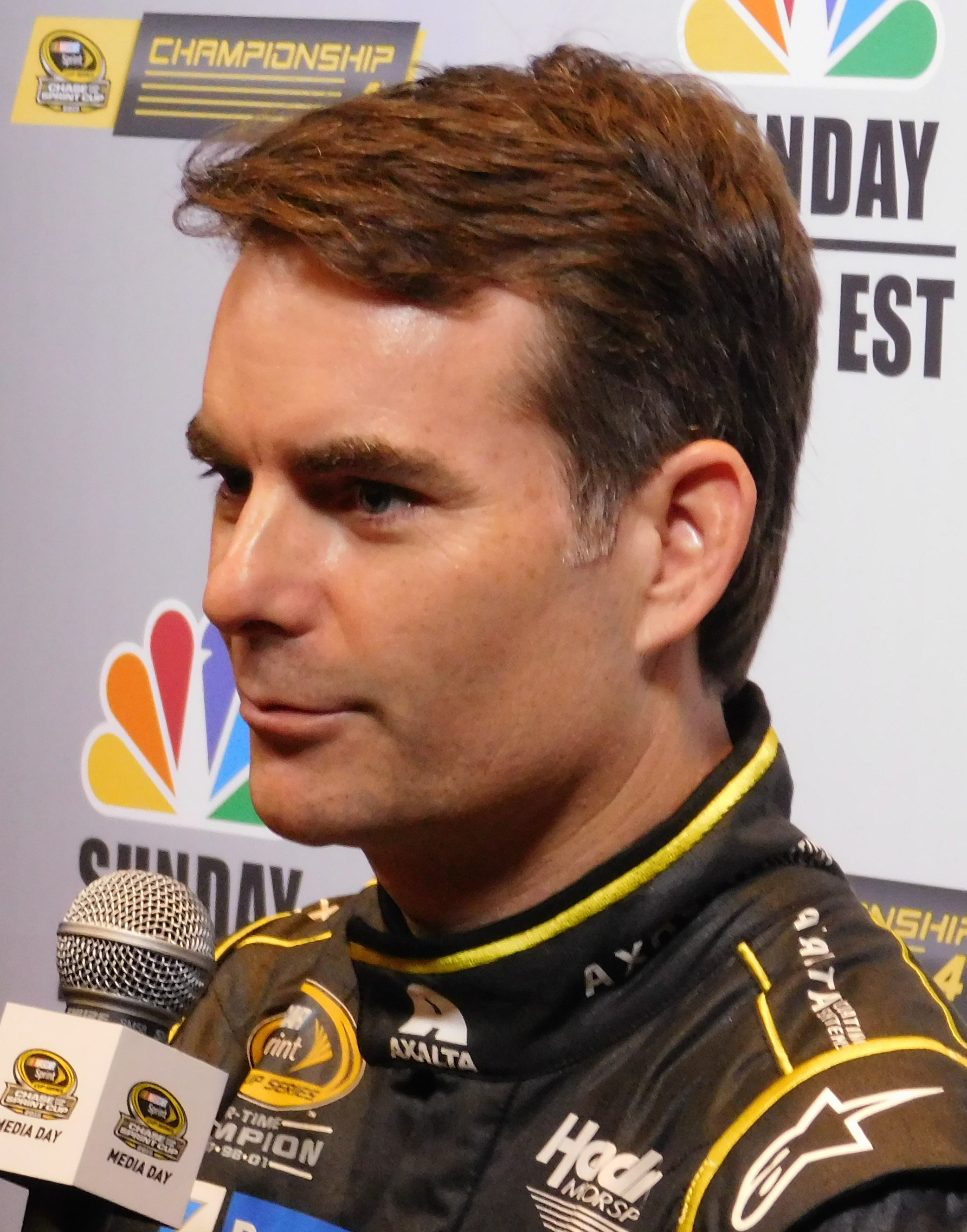
Jeff Gordon won the race from the pole position.

Jeff Gordon led the field to the green flag, but was unable to hold the lead immediately, as Joey Logano took the lead on the opening lap. The caution flag flew for the first time on lap four after Kyle Busch hit the wall in turn one, following previous contact at turn four. The race restarted on lap eight, and was able to run cleanly until a competition caution, which had been necessitated following overnight rain showers. Ryan Newman stayed out when the leaders pitted so he assumed the lead. The race restarted on lap 25, but the caution flag flew almost immediately, after Danica Patrick started spinning in turn 1. Justin Allgaier, Michael Annett, Trevor Bayne, Matt Kenseth, Martin Truex Jr. and Yeley were all involved in the crash. Jimmie Johnson, who had stayed out along with Newman during the second caution, managed to move ahead of him prior to the yellow flag coming out, and thus assumed the lead.

The race restarted on lap 31, before debris in turn 2 brought out the fourth caution of the race on lap 37. Johnson elected to come onto pit road during the caution and Logano retook the lead for the restart, on lap 41. Logano held the lead for the next portion of the race, before Gordon took the lead on lap 56, with the help of the lapped car of Yeley. Gordon and Logano swapped the lead over the next couple of laps, before Gordon maintained the lead until his next pit stop, on lap 64. He handed the lead over to teammate Dale Earnhardt Jr. who kept the lead until lap 68, when he pitted and handed the lead to teammate Johnson. Johnson pitted on lap 76 and handed the lead back to Newman; Johnson rejoined the circuit a lap down in 25th place. Newman pitted on lap 79 and handed the lead back to Gordon. During this stint at the front – at the end of the 92nd lap – Gordon recorded his 1,000th lap led at Michigan races.

=== Second half ===
The caution flew for the fifth time on lap 97 after Kyle Larson blew a right-front tire and hit the wall in turn 4. Larson was disappointed at the end result stating it was "a shame" but stated that it fired up his impetus for a bid to make the Chase for the Sprint Cup. Newman stayed out when the leaders pitted so he retook the lead for the restart on lap 109. Logano retook the lead at the restart, and maintained the lead throughout a lengthy green-flag period of the race. Logano pitted on lap 140 and handed the lead to Kurt Busch, who himself held the lead for a few laps before his own pit stop. Gordon cycled through to the lead, holding it until his final stop, on lap 165. Busch led a lap before pitting, passing the lead to Brad Keselowski.

==== Finish ====
Just after he assumed the lead of the race, Keselowski hit the wall in turn 1 and brought out the sixth caution on lap 168, which resulted in Kasey Kahne taking the lead. Kahne pitted under the caution and Logano retook the lead for the restart, with 27 laps to go. Before the completion of a full lap of racing, the caution flags flew once again, when Brian Vickers got loose and spun in turn four. The race restarted with 23 laps to go. Kurt Busch got loose exiting turn two while battling Logano for the lead; his car started coming apart on the front stretch, hit the wall again in turn one and brought out the eighth caution of the race, as debris was scattered all over the track. The race restarted with 17 laps to go; Gordon took the lead from Logano and went on to win for the 91st time in his career. Gordon stated that he had "got a really good restart, and I got to his quarter panel in Turn 1 and I was able to drag him back and it allowed me to get the momentum and get by him". Logano felt he had Gordon cleared and lamented that he "should have pulled down in front of him".

=== Race results ===
Pos	No.	Driver	Team	Manufacturer	Laps	Points
1	24	Jeff Gordon	Hendrick Motorsports	Chevrolet	200	47
2	4	Kevin Harvick	Stewart–Haas Racing	Chevrolet	200	42
3	22	Joey Logano	Team Penske	Ford	200	43
4	27	Paul Menard	Richard Childress Racing	Chevrolet	200	40
5	88	Dale Earnhardt Jr.	Hendrick Motorsports	Chevrolet	200	40
6	15	Clint Bowyer	Michael Waltrip Racing	Toyota	200	38
7	11	Denny Hamlin	Joe Gibbs Racing	Toyota	200	37
8	2	Brad Keselowski	Team Penske	Ford	200	37
9	48	Jimmie Johnson	Hendrick Motorsports	Chevrolet	200	36
10	16	Greg Biffle	Roush Fenway Racing	Ford	200	34
11	31	Ryan Newman	Richard Childress Racing	Chevrolet	200	34
12	9	Marcos Ambrose	Richard Petty Motorsports	Ford	200	32
13	47	A. J. Allmendinger	JTG Daugherty Racing	Chevrolet	200	31
14	1	Jamie McMurray	Chip Ganassi Racing	Chevrolet	200	30
15	17	Ricky Stenhouse Jr.	Roush Fenway Racing	Ford	200	29
16	5	Kasey Kahne	Hendrick Motorsports	Chevrolet	200	29
17	13	Casey Mears	Germain Racing	Chevrolet	200	27
18	10	Danica Patrick	Stewart–Haas Racing	Chevrolet	200	26
19	55	Brian Vickers	Michael Waltrip Racing	Toyota	199	25
20	43	Aric Almirola	Richard Petty Motorsports	Ford	199	24
21	38	David Gilliland	Front Row Motorsports	Ford	199	23
22	3	Austin Dillon (R)	Richard Childress Racing	Chevrolet	199	22
23	99	Carl Edwards	Roush Fenway Racing	Ford	198	21
24	34	David Ragan	Front Row Motorsports	Ford	198	20
25	26	Cole Whitt (R)	BK Racing	Toyota	198	19
26	23	Alex Bowman (R)	BK Racing	Toyota	198	18
27	36	Reed Sorenson	Tommy Baldwin Racing	Chevrolet	197	17
28	98	Josh Wise	Phil Parsons Racing	Chevrolet	197	16
29	40	Landon Cassill	Hillman–Circle Sport	Chevrolet	197	0
30	83	J. J. Yeley	BK Racing	Toyota	197	0
31	41	Kurt Busch	Stewart–Haas Racing	Chevrolet	196	14
32	32	Travis Kvapil	Go FAS Racing	Ford	196	12
33	37	Dave Blaney	Tommy Baldwin Racing	Chevrolet	195	11
34	33	Alex Kennedy	Hillman–Circle Sport	Chevrolet	195	10
35	66	Joe Nemechek	Identity Ventures Racing	Toyota	195	0
36	78	Martin Truex Jr.	Furniture Row Racing	Chevrolet	177	8
37	14	Jeff Burton	Stewart–Haas Racing	Chevrolet	176	7
38	20	Matt Kenseth	Joe Gibbs Racing	Toyota	170	6
39	18	Kyle Busch	Joe Gibbs Racing	Toyota	159	5
40	7	Michael Annett (R)	Tommy Baldwin Racing	Chevrolet	155	4
41	21	Trevor Bayne	Wood Brothers Racing	Ford	153	0
42	51	Justin Allgaier (R)	HScott Motorsports	Chevrolet	97	2
43	42	Kyle Larson (R)	Chip Ganassi Racing	Chevrolet	94	1

== Standings after the race ==
Drivers' Championship standings

	Pos	Driver	Points
1	1	Jeff Gordon	816
1	2	Dale Earnhardt Jr.	813 (−3)
1	3	Brad Keselowski	733 (−83)
1	4	Joey Logano	714 (−102)
2	5	Matt Kenseth	709 (−107)
2	6	Kevin Harvick	687 (−129)
	7	Jimmie Johnson	686 (−130)
2	8	Carl Edwards	679 (−137)
	9	Ryan Newman	679 (−137)
1	10	Clint Bowyer	672 (−144)
1	11	Greg Biffle	660 (−156)
1	12	Kasey Kahne	651 (−165)
1	13	Austin Dillon (R)	638 (−178)
4	14	Kyle Larson (R)	636 (−180)
	15	Kyle Busch	620 (−196)
	16	Marcos Ambrose	616 (−200)

Manufacturers' Championship standings

Pos	Manufacturer	Points
1	Chevrolet	1,037
2	Ford	1,002 (−35)
3	Toyota	921 (−116)

- Note: Only the first sixteen positions are included for the driver standings.

== Media ==
=== Race statistics ===
- 20 lead changes among different drivers
- 8 cautions for 37 laps
- Time of race: 2:49:16
- Jeff Gordon won his third race in 2014

=== Television ===
ESPN
Booth announcers	Pit reporters
Lap-by-lap: Allen Bestwick; Color-commentator: Dale Jarrett; Color commentator: Andy Petree	Jerry Punch; Dave Burns; Vince Welch; Jamie Little

=== Radio ===
MRN Radio
Booth announcers	Turn announcers	Pit reporters
Lead announcer: Joe Moore; Announcer: Jeff Striegle	Turns 1 & 2 Dave Moody; Turns 3 & 4: Buddy Long	Winston Kelly; Steve Post; Alex Hayden; Pete Pistone

== Notes ==
Previous race: 2014 Cheez-It 355 at The Glen	Sprint Cup Series; 2014 season	Next race: 2014 Irwin Tools Night Race
