= 2014 Toyota/Save Mart 350 =

Race details
- Race 16 of 36 in the 2014 NASCAR Sprint Cup Series
- 2014 Toyota/Save Mart 350 program cover
- Date: June 22, 2014
- Location: Sonoma Raceway, Sonoma, California
- Course: Permanent racing facility
- Course length: 1.99 miles (3.2 km)
- Distance: 110 laps, 218.9 mi (352.3 km)
- Weather: Sunny with a high temperature around 79 °F (26 °C); wind out of the SW at 11 miles per hour (18 km/h).
- Average speed: 76.583 mph (123.248 km/h)

Pole position
Driver	Jamie McMurray	Chip Ganassi Racing
- Time: 74.354

Most laps led
Driver	A. J. Allmendinger	JTG Daugherty Racing
- Laps: 47

Winner
No. 99	Carl Edwards	Roush Fenway Racing

Television in the United States
- Network: TNT & PRN
- Announcers: Adam Alexander, Wally Dallenbach Jr. and Kyle Petty (Television); Doug Rice and Mark Garrow (Booth); Rob Albright (2, 3, 3a), Wendy Venturini (4a, 7, 7a), Brad Gillie (8, 8a, 9, 10) (Turns) (Radio)
- Nielsen ratings: 2.8/7; 4.676 Million viewers

The 2014 Toyota/Save Mart 350 was a NASCAR Sprint Cup Series stock car race that was held on June 22, 2014, at Sonoma Raceway in Sonoma, California. Contested over 110 laps on the 1.99-mile (3.20 km) road course, it was the 16th race of the 2014 NASCAR Sprint Cup Series, and the first of two road course competitions on the schedule. Carl Edwards won the race, his second win of the season and first on a road course in Sprint Cup competition. Jeff Gordon finished second, while Dale Earnhardt Jr., Jamie McMurray, and Paul Menard rounded out the top five. The top rookies of the race were Austin Dillon (17th), Cole Whitt (27th), and Kyle Larson (28th).

== Report ==
=== Entry list ===
The entry list for the Toyota/Save Mart 350 was released on Monday, June 15, 2014, at 1:03 p.m. Eastern time. Forty-three drivers were entered for the race.

No.	Driver	Team	Manufacturer
1	Jamie McMurray	Chip Ganassi Racing	Chevrolet
2	Brad Keselowski (PC2)	Team Penske	Ford
3	Austin Dillon (R)	Richard Childress Racing	Chevrolet
4	Kevin Harvick	Stewart–Haas Racing	Chevrolet
5	Kasey Kahne	Hendrick Motorsports	Chevrolet
7	Michael Annett (R)	Tommy Baldwin Racing	Chevrolet
9	Marcos Ambrose	Richard Petty Motorsports	Ford
10	Danica Patrick	Stewart–Haas Racing	Chevrolet
11	Denny Hamlin	Joe Gibbs Racing	Toyota
13	Casey Mears	Germain Racing	Chevrolet
14	Tony Stewart (PC3)	Stewart–Haas Racing	Chevrolet
15	Clint Bowyer	Michael Waltrip Racing	Toyota
16	Greg Biffle	Roush Fenway Racing	Ford
17	Ricky Stenhouse Jr.	Roush Fenway Racing	Ford
18	Kyle Busch	Joe Gibbs Racing	Toyota
20	Matt Kenseth (PC5)	Joe Gibbs Racing	Toyota
22	Joey Logano	Team Penske	Ford
23	Alex Bowman (R)	BK Racing	Toyota
24	Jeff Gordon (PC6)	Hendrick Motorsports	Chevrolet
26	Cole Whitt (R)	BK Racing	Toyota
27	Paul Menard	Richard Childress Racing	Chevrolet
31	Ryan Newman	Richard Childress Racing	Chevrolet
32	Boris Said	Go FAS Racing	Ford
33	Alex Kennedy	Circle Sport	Chevrolet
34	David Ragan	Front Row Motorsports	Ford
36	Reed Sorenson	Tommy Baldwin Racing	Chevrolet
38	David Gilliland	Front Row Motorsports	Ford
40	Landon Cassill (i)	Circle Sport	Chevrolet
41	Kurt Busch (PC4)	Stewart–Haas Racing	Chevrolet
42	Kyle Larson (R)	Chip Ganassi Racing	Chevrolet
43	Aric Almirola	Richard Petty Motorsports	Ford
44	J. J. Yeley (i)	Xxxtreme Motorsports	Chevrolet
47	A. J. Allmendinger	JTG Daugherty Racing	Chevrolet
48	Jimmie Johnson (PC1)	Hendrick Motorsports	Chevrolet
51	Justin Allgaier (R)	HScott Motorsports	Chevrolet
55	Brian Vickers	Michael Waltrip Racing	Toyota
66	Tomy Drissi	Michael Waltrip Racing	Toyota
78	Martin Truex Jr.	Furniture Row Racing	Chevrolet
83	Ryan Truex (R)	BK Racing	Toyota
88	Dale Earnhardt Jr.	Hendrick Motorsports	Chevrolet
95	Michael McDowell	Leavine Family Racing	Ford
98	Josh Wise	Phil Parsons Racing	Chevrolet
99	Carl Edwards	Roush Fenway Racing	Ford
Official entry list

Key	Meaning
(R)	Rookie
(i)	Ineligible for points
(PC#)	Past champions provisional

== Practice ==
=== First practice ===
Kurt Busch was the fastest in the first practice session with a time of 75.039 and a speed of 95.470 mph (153.644 km/h).

Pos	No.	Driver	Team	Manufacturer	Time	Speed
1	41	Kurt Busch	Stewart–Haas Racing	Chevrolet	75.039	95.470
2	15	Clint Bowyer	Michael Waltrip Racing	Toyota	75.078	95.421
3	55	Brian Vickers	Michael Waltrip Racing	Toyota	75.347	95.080
Official first practice results

=== Final practice ===
Clint Bowyer was the fastest in the final practice session with a time of 74.634 and a speed of 95.988 mph (154.478 km/h).

Pos	No.	Driver	Team	Manufacturer	Time	Speed
1	15	Clint Bowyer	Michael Waltrip Racing	Toyota	74.634	95.988
2	27	Paul Menard	Richard Childress Racing	Chevrolet	74.981	95.544
3	99	Carl Edwards	Roush Fenway Racing	Ford	75.043	95.465
Official final practice results

== Qualifying ==
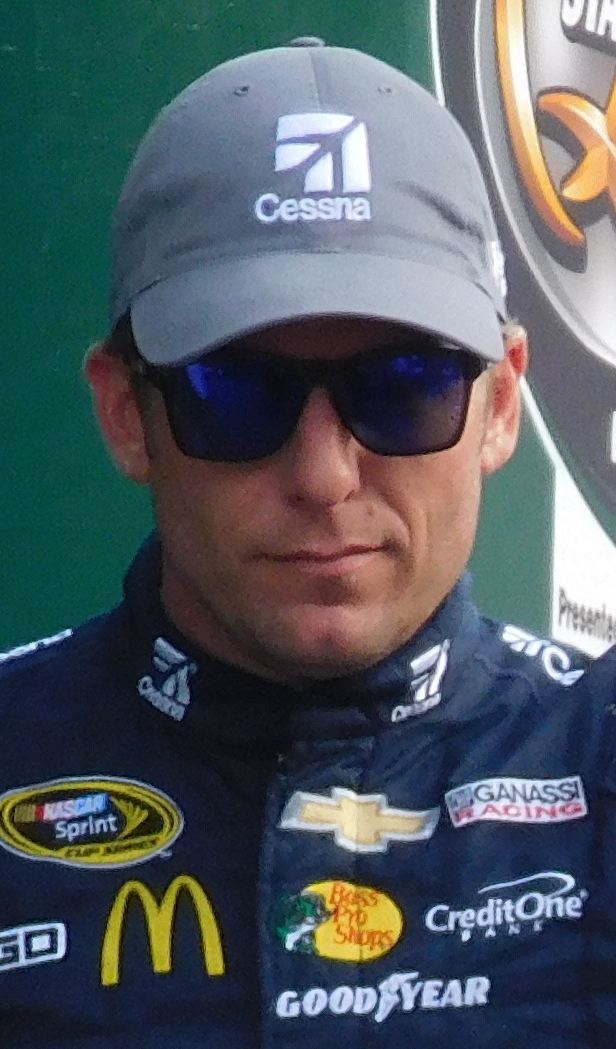
Jamie McMurray won the pole position, setting a new track record.

Jamie McMurray won the pole with a new track record time of 74.354 and a speed of 96.350 mph (155.060 km/h). "This race is about having good strategy and having a little bit of luck," McMurray said. "It's about not getting run into in Turn 4 or Turn 7 on a restart. I've run enough races here that I've had every issue you could have with running out of gas ... to getting wrecked in Turn 7 on a restart because someone from 15th dive-bombed me into the corner with no chance of making it." "Well that wasn't what we expected," Bowyer said. "We were fast all day (Friday), just didn't have enough grip and missed Turn 4. We will just have to pass a few more cars (Sunday)."

=== Qualifying results ===
Pos	No.	Driver	Team	Manufacturer	R1	R2
1	1	Jamie McMurray	Chip Ganassi Racing	Chevrolet	74.657	74.354
2	47	A. J. Allmendinger	JTG Daugherty Racing	Chevrolet	74.539	74.557
3	42	Kyle Larson (R)	Chip Ganassi Racing	Chevrolet	74.802	74.670
4	99	Carl Edwards	Roush Fenway Racing	Ford	74.917	74.736
5	41	Kurt Busch	Stewart–Haas Racing	Chevrolet	74.554	74.856
6	4	Kevin Harvick	Stewart–Haas Racing	Chevrolet	74.813	74.894
7	31	Ryan Newman	Richard Childress Racing	Chevrolet	74.652	74.925
8	55	Brian Vickers	Michael Waltrip Racing	Toyota	74.751	74.958
9	27	Paul Menard	Richard Childress Racing	Chevrolet	74.851	74.994
10	22	Joey Logano	Team Penske	Ford	74.472	75.081
11	10	Danica Patrick	Stewart–Haas Racing	Chevrolet	74.711	75.083
12	13	Casey Mears	Germain Racing	Chevrolet	74.791	75.152
13	2	Brad Keselowski	Team Penske	Ford	74.924	—
14	20	Matt Kenseth	Joe Gibbs Racing	Toyota	74.933	—
15	24	Jeff Gordon	Hendrick Motorsports	Chevrolet	74.975	—
16	11	Denny Hamlin	Joe Gibbs Racing	Toyota	75.032	—
17	88	Dale Earnhardt Jr.	Hendrick Motorsports	Chevrolet	75.046	—
18	78	Martin Truex Jr.	Front Row Motorsports	Chevrolet	75.054	—
19	16	Greg Biffle	Roush Fenway Racing	Ford	75.069	—
20	18	Kyle Busch	Joe Gibbs Racing	Toyota	75.112	—
21	14	Tony Stewart	Stewart–Haas Racing	Chevrolet	75.167	—
22	48	Jimmie Johnson	Hendrick Motorsports	Chevrolet	75.176	—
23	9	Marcos Ambrose	Richard Petty Motorsports	Ford	75.215	—
24	17	Ricky Stenhouse Jr.	Roush Fenway Racing	Ford	75.303	—
25	15	Clint Bowyer	Michael Waltrip Racing	Toyota	75.376	—
26	3	Austin Dillon (R)	Richard Childress Racing	Chevrolet	75.388	—
27	38	David Gilliland	Front Row Motorsports	Ford	75.417	—
28	95	Michael McDowell	Leavine Family Racing	Ford	75.433	—
29	43	Aric Almirola	Richard Petty Motorsports	Ford	75.492	—
30	5	Kasey Kahne	Hendrick Motorsports	Chevrolet	75.518	—
31	34	David Ragan	Front Row Motorsports	Ford	75.575	—
32	26	Cole Whitt (R)	BK Racing	Toyota	75.622	—
33	98	Josh Wise	Phil Parsons Racing	Chevrolet	75.755	—
34	83	Ryan Truex (R)	BK Racing	Toyota	75.760	—
35	51	Justin Allgaier (R)	HScott Motorsports	Chevrolet	75.817	—
36	33	Alex Kennedy	Circle Sport	Chevrolet	76.094	—
37	40	Landon Cassill (Note: Landon Cassill and J. J. Yeley started from the rear, as both drivers were replaced by a substitute driver to qualify their cars. Both drivers had been competing at Road America in a Nationwide Series event.)	Circle Sport	Chevrolet	76.203	—
38	23	Alex Bowman (R)	BK Racing	Toyota	76.321	—
39	44	J. J. Yeley	Xxxtreme Motorsports	Chevrolet	76.423	—
40	36	Reed Sorenson	Tommy Baldwin Racing	Chevrolet	76.622	—
41	32	Boris Said	Go FAS Racing	Ford	76.721	—
42	7	Michael Annett (R)	Tommy Baldwin Racing	Chevrolet	77.632	—
43	66	Tomy Drissi	Identity Ventures Racing	Toyota	78.626	—
Qualifying Results

== Race ==
=== First half ===
==== Start ====
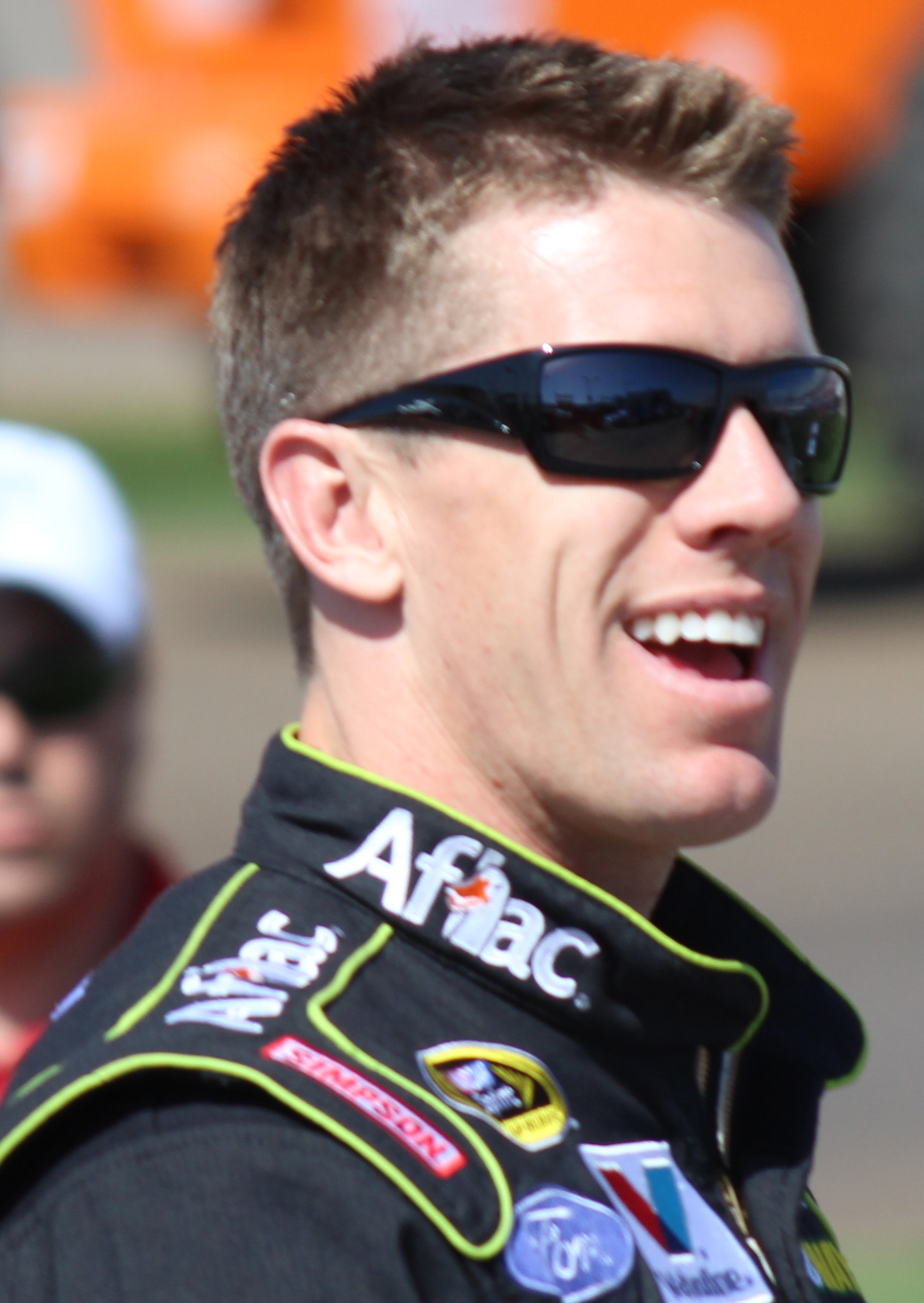
Carl Edwards won the race.

The race was scheduled to start at 3:15 p.m. Eastern time, but started seven minutes later, with Jamie McMurray leading the field to the green. A. J. Allmendinger put pressure on him for the first few laps but was unable to take the lead. Defending race winner Martin Truex Jr. made an unscheduled stop on lap seven for a vibration, while Allmendinger wrested the lead from McMurray on lap nine. Kyle Busch nicked Brad Keselowski in turn 11, which forced Keselowski down the order by 8 spots. While describing his car as "bad", Keselowski reckoned he "deserved to get spun out". Kevin Harvick took the lead from Allmendinger on lap 22, before the first caution of the race came out on lap 31 after Landon Cassill blew an engine. During pit stops under the caution, Allmendinger retook the lead. Allmendinger led the field to the green on the restart on lap 35. Casey Mears got boxed in at turn 7a and sustained heavy damage that forced him to make an unscheduled pit stop the next lap, while Kasey Kahne also sustained damage.

=== Second half ===
McMurray retook the lead from Allmendinger on lap 54, before he pulled off to pit and handed the lead to Jeff Gordon. Harvick was able to take the lead from Gordon, when Gordon pitted on lap 58. The second caution of the race occurred on lap 61, as Ryan Truex stalled in the esses. Most of the cars on the lead lap stayed out, with Harvick leading the field to the restart on lap 65. Jimmie Johnson took the lead from Harvick exiting turn 4, before the third caution of the race came out on lap 71 for debris. Joey Logano stayed out during the cycle of pit stops under caution to take the lead. The race restarted on lap 75 with Clint Bowyer taking the lead from Logano, going into turn 7a. The fourth caution flew for a hard wreck in the esses. Dale Earnhardt Jr.'s car hopped over a curb and collided with Matt Kenseth and sent him head on into the tire barriers. He was able to extricate himself from his wrecked car.

==== Closing stage ====
The race restarted on lap 80 with Bowyer leading the field but he surrendered the lead to Marcos Ambrose in turn 1. Johnson also passed Bowyer for second, going into turn 11. Bowyer was then turned around by McMurray and was then hit by Harvick. Harvick's stranded car forced the race to go under caution for the fifth time. The race restarted with 25 laps to go with Ambrose leading the way, but he lost the lead to Carl Edwards. Earnhardt Jr. pinned Allmendinger into the wall coming to the line, causing substantial damage to Allmendinger's car. Ricky Stenhouse Jr. was hit by Brian Vickers to bring out the sixth caution, with 20 laps to go.

===== Finish =====
The race was restarted 16 laps to go, and Edwards held off a last lap charge by Gordon to win for the first time on a road course, in NASCAR. He later described his race as "real tough", and his victory as "very special". Gordon stated that he had been "overdriving" his car, and he wished he "had just stayed smooth and stuck with it", while chasing Edwards towards the end. The victory would be the one and only road course victory Edwards would win in the NASCAR Cup Series.

=== Race results ===
Pos	No.	Driver	Team	Manufacturer	Laps	Points
1	99	Carl Edwards	Roush Fenway Racing	Ford	110	47
2	24	Jeff Gordon	Hendrick Motorsports	Chevrolet	110	43
3	88	Dale Earnhardt Jr.	Hendrick Motorsports	Chevrolet	110	41
4	1	Jamie McMurray	Chip Ganassi Racing	Chevrolet	110	41
5	27	Paul Menard	Richard Childress Racing	Chevrolet	110	39
6	5	Kasey Kahne	Hendrick Motorsports	Chevrolet	110	38
7	48	Jimmie Johnson	Hendrick Motorsports	Chevrolet	110	38
8	9	Marcos Ambrose	Richard Petty Motorsports	Ford	110	37
9	16	Greg Biffle	Roush Fenway Racing	Ford	110	35
10	15	Clint Bowyer	Michael Waltrip Racing	Toyota	110	35
11	31	Ryan Newman	Richard Childress Racing	Chevrolet	110	33
12	41	Kurt Busch	Stewart–Haas Racing	Chevrolet	110	32
13	13	Casey Mears	Germain Racing	Chevrolet	110	31
14	55	Brian Vickers	Michael Waltrip Racing	Toyota	110	30
15	78	Martin Truex Jr.	Furniture Row Racing	Chevrolet	110	29
16	22	Joey Logano	Team Penske	Ford	110	29
17	3	Austin Dillon (R)	Richard Childress Racing	Chevrolet	110	27
18	10	Danica Patrick	Stewart–Haas Racing	Chevrolet	110	26
19	14	Tony Stewart	Stewart–Haas Racing	Chevrolet	110	25
20	4	Kevin Harvick	Stewart–Haas Racing	Chevrolet	110	25
21	38	David Gilliland	Front Row Motorsports	Ford	110	23
22	2	Brad Keselowski	Team Penske	Ford	110	22
23	43	Aric Almirola	Richard Petty Motorsports	Ford	110	21
24	95	Michael McDowell	Leavine Family Racing	Ford	110	20
25	18	Kyle Busch	Joe Gibbs Racing	Toyota	110	19
26	11	Denny Hamlin	Joe Gibbs Racing	Toyota	110	18
27	26	Cole Whitt (R)	BK Racing	Toyota	110	17
28	42	Kyle Larson (R)	Chip Ganassi Racing	Chevrolet	110	16
29	23	Alex Bowman (R)	BK Racing	Toyota	110	15
30	7	Michael Annett (R)	Tommy Baldwin Racing	Chevrolet	110	14
31	17	Ricky Stenhouse Jr.	Roush Fenway Racing	Ford	109	13
32	36	Reed Sorenson	Tommy Baldwin Racing	Chevrolet	109	12
33	51	Justin Allgaier (R)	HScott Motorsports	Chevrolet	109	11
34	44	J. J. Yeley	Xxxtreme Motorsports	Chevrolet	109	0
35	32	Boris Said	Go FAS Racing	Ford	109	9
36	34	David Ragan	Front Row Motorsports	Ford	109	8
37	47	A. J. Allmendinger	JTG Daugherty Racing	Chevrolet	108	9
38	66	Tomy Drissi	Identity Ventures Racing	Toyota	108	6
39	33	Alex Kennedy	Circle Sport	Chevrolet	104	5
40	98	Josh Wise	Phil Parsons Racing	Chevrolet	95	4
41	83	Ryan Truex (R)	BK Racing	Toyota	91	3
42	20	Matt Kenseth	Joe Gibbs Racing	Toyota	74	2
43	40	Landon Cassill	Circle Sport	Chevrolet	29	0
Race Results

=== Race summary ===
- Lead changes: 11 among different drivers
- Cautions/Laps: 6 for 19
- Red flags: 0
- Time of race: 2 hours, 51 minutes and 30 seconds
- Average speed: 76.583 miles per hour (123.248 km/h)

== Media ==
=== Television ===
TNT Sports
Booth announcers	Pit reporters
Lap-by-lap: Adam Alexander; Color-commentator: Wally Dallenbach Jr. Color commentator: Kyle Petty	Matt Yocum; Marty Snider; Chris Neville; Ralph Sheheen

=== Radio ===
PRN Radio
Booth announcers	Turn announcers	Pit reporters
Lead announcer: Doug Rice; Announcer: Mark Garrow	Turns 2, 3 & 3a: Rob Albright; Turns 4a, 7 & 7a: Wendy Venturini; Turns 8, 8a, 9 & 10: Brad Gillie	Brett McMillan; Steve Richards; Jim Noble; Pat Patterson

== Standings after the race ==
Drivers' Championship standings

	Pos	Driver	Points
	1	Jeff Gordon	580
	2	Jimmie Johnson	560 (−20)
	3	Dale Earnhardt Jr.	555 (−25)
	4	Matt Kenseth	515 (−65)
	5	Brad Keselowski	512 (−68)
	6	Carl Edwards	509 (−71)
	7	Joey Logano	483 (−97)
3	8	Ryan Newman	473 (−107)
	9	Kevin Harvick	472 (−108)
2	10	Kyle Larson (R)	470 (−110)
1	11	Kyle Busch	465 (−115)
1	12	Paul Menard	459 (−121)
1	13	Denny Hamlin	453 (−127)
	14	Clint Bowyer	452 (−128)
	15	Greg Biffle	444 (−136)
3	16	Kasey Kahne	429 (−151)

Manufacturers' Championship standings

Pos	Manufacturer	Points
1	Chevrolet	722
2	Ford	691 (−31)
3	Toyota	638 (−84)

- Note: Only the first sixteen positions are included for the driver standings.

== Note ==
Previous race: 2014 Quicken Loans 400	Sprint Cup Series; 2014 season	Next race: 2014 Quaker State 400
