= 2016 Cheez-It 355 at The Glen =

Race details
- Race 22 of 36 in the 2016 NASCAR Sprint Cup Series
- The layout of Watkins Glen International NASCAR uses.
- Date: August 7, 2016
- Location: Watkins Glen International in Watkins Glen, New York
- Course: Permanent racing facility
- Course length: 2.45 miles (3.94 km)
- Distance: 90 laps, 220.5 mi (354.6 km)

Pole position
Driver	Carl Edwards	Joe Gibbs Racing
- Time: 1:09.689

Most laps led
Driver	Brad Keselowski	Team Penske
- Laps: 28

Winner
No. 11	Denny Hamlin	Joe Gibbs Racing

Television in the United States
- Network: USA Network
- Announcers: Rick Allen, Jeff Burton and Steve Letarte
- Nielsen ratings: 2.1/4 (Overnight); 2.3/4 (Final); 3.8 million viewers

Radio in the United States
- Radio: MRN
- Booth announcers: Joe Moore, Jeff Striegle and Rusty Wallace
- Turn announcers: Dave Moody (Esses), Mike Bagley (Turn 5) and Kyle Rickey (Turn 10 & 11)

The 2016 Cheez-It 355 at The Glen was a NASCAR Sprint Cup Series stock car race held on August 7, 2016 at Watkins Glen International in Watkins Glen, New York. Contested over 90 laps on the 2.45-mile (3.94 km) road course, it was the 22nd race of the 2016 NASCAR Sprint Cup Series season. Denny Hamlin won the race, his second of the season. Joey Logano finished second. Brad Keselowski, A. J. Allmendinger and Tony Stewart rounded out the top-five.

The race had nine lead changes among eight different drivers, eight cautions for 20 laps and two red flags for 30 minutes and three seconds.

== Entry list ==
The preliminary entry list for the race included 40 cars and was released on August 1, 2016 at 9:55 a.m. Eastern time.

No.	Driver	Team	Manufacturer
1	Jamie McMurray	Chip Ganassi Racing	Chevrolet
2	Brad Keselowski	Team Penske	Ford
3	Austin Dillon	Richard Childress Racing	Chevrolet
4	Kevin Harvick	Stewart–Haas Racing	Chevrolet
5	Kasey Kahne	Hendrick Motorsports	Chevrolet
6	Trevor Bayne	Roush Fenway Racing	Ford
7	Regan Smith	Tommy Baldwin Racing	Chevrolet
10	Danica Patrick	Stewart–Haas Racing	Chevrolet
11	Denny Hamlin	Joe Gibbs Racing	Toyota
13	Casey Mears	Germain Racing	Chevrolet
14	Tony Stewart	Stewart–Haas Racing	Chevrolet
15	Clint Bowyer	HScott Motorsports	Chevrolet
16	Greg Biffle	Roush Fenway Racing	Ford
17	Ricky Stenhouse Jr.	Roush Fenway Racing	Ford
18	Kyle Busch	Joe Gibbs Racing	Toyota
19	Carl Edwards	Joe Gibbs Racing	Toyota
20	Matt Kenseth	Joe Gibbs Racing	Toyota
21	Ryan Blaney (R)	Wood Brothers Racing	Ford
22	Joey Logano	Team Penske	Ford
23	David Ragan	BK Racing	Toyota
24	Chase Elliott (R)	Hendrick Motorsports	Chevrolet
27	Paul Menard	Richard Childress Racing	Chevrolet
30	Josh Wise	The Motorsports Group	Chevrolet
31	Ryan Newman	Richard Childress Racing	Chevrolet
32	Boris Said	Go FAS Racing	Ford
34	Chris Buescher (R)	Front Row Motorsports	Ford
38	Landon Cassill	Front Row Motorsports	Ford
41	Kurt Busch	Stewart–Haas Racing	Chevrolet
42	Kyle Larson	Chip Ganassi Racing	Chevrolet
43	Aric Almirola	Richard Petty Motorsports	Ford
44	Brian Scott (R)	Richard Petty Motorsports	Ford
46	Michael Annett	HScott Motorsports	Chevrolet
47	A. J. Allmendinger	JTG Daugherty Racing	Chevrolet
48	Jimmie Johnson	Hendrick Motorsports	Chevrolet
55	Alex Kennedy	Premium Motorsports	Chevrolet
78	Martin Truex Jr.	Furniture Row Racing	Toyota
83	Matt DiBenedetto	BK Racing	Toyota
88	Jeff Gordon	Hendrick Motorsports	Chevrolet
95	Michael McDowell	Circle Sport – Leavine Family Racing	Chevrolet
98	Cole Whitt	Premium Motorsports	Toyota
Official initial entry list
Official final entry list

== Practice ==
=== First practice ===
Martin Truex Jr. was the fastest in the first practice session with a time of 1:09.513 and a speed of 126.883 mph (204.198 km/h).

Pos	No.	Driver	Team	Manufacturer	Time	Speed
1	78	Martin Truex Jr.	Furniture Row Racing	Toyota	1:09.513	126.883
2	11	Denny Hamlin	Joe Gibbs Racing	Toyota	1:09.810	126.343
3	13	Casey Mears	Germain Racing	Chevrolet	1:10.058	125.896
Official first practice results

=== Final practice ===
A. J. Allmendinger was the fastest in the final practice session with a time of 1:09.149 and a speed of 127.551 mph (205.273 km/h).

Pos	No.	Driver	Team	Manufacturer	Time	Speed
1	47	A. J. Allmendinger	JTG Daugherty Racing	Chevrolet	1:09.149	127.551
2	78	Martin Truex Jr.	Furniture Row Racing	Toyota	1:09.187	127.481
3	17	Ricky Stenhouse Jr.	Roush Fenway Racing	Ford	1:09.222	127.416
Official final practice results

== Qualifying ==
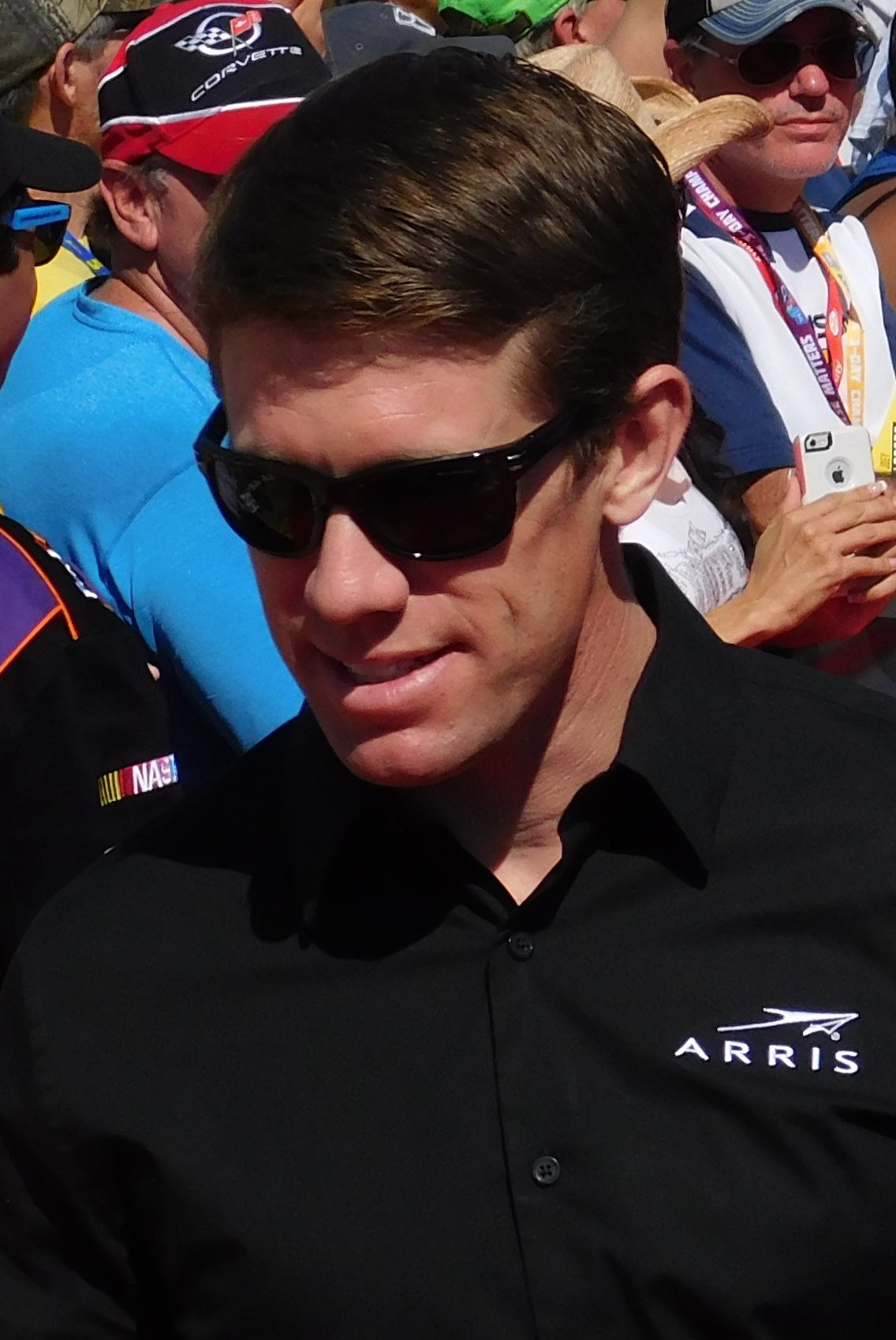
Carl Edwards scored the pole position.

Carl Edwards scored the pole for the race with a time of 1:09.689 and a speed of 126.562 mph (203.682 km/h). He said afterwards that "the track is a little strange. It started out really slippery the first run. But, just really proud of my guys and everybody on this Stanley Toyota team. Dave Wilson from TRD (Toyota Racing Development, president) just came down. They’re a huge part of this. My teammates they’re really fast. Kyle (Busch) is really fast and Martin’s (Truex Jr.) is really fast. You’ve got to work a little bit in race trim but we’re starting upfront and we’ve got a great pit crew and hopefully we can put that Stanley in Victory Lane."

=== Qualifying results ===
Pos	No.	Driver	Team	Manufacturer	R1	R2
1	19	Carl Edwards	Joe Gibbs Racing	Toyota	70.037	69.689
2	42	Kyle Larson	Chip Ganassi Racing	Chevrolet	70.274	69.871
3	14	Tony Stewart	Stewart–Haas Racing	Chevrolet	70.557	69.902
4	20	Matt Kenseth	Joe Gibbs Racing	Toyota	70.192	69.942
5	18	Kyle Busch	Joe Gibbs Racing	Toyota	70.351	69.945
6	11	Denny Hamlin	Joe Gibbs Racing	Toyota	70.331	69.999
7	22	Joey Logano	Team Penske	Ford	69.880	70.042
8	31	Ryan Newman	Richard Childress Racing	Chevrolet	70.481	70.094
9	47	A. J. Allmendinger	JTG Daugherty Racing	Chevrolet	70.162	70.210
10	1	Jamie McMurray	Chip Ganassi Racing	Chevrolet	70.172	70.259
11	95	Michael McDowell	Circle Sport-Leavine Family Racing	Chevrolet	70.248	70.352
12	2	Brad Keselowski	Team Penske	Ford	70.135	70.571
13	48	Jimmie Johnson	Hendrick Motorsports	Chevrolet	70.571	
14	78	Martin Truex Jr.	Furniture Row Racing	Toyota	70.578	
15	4	Kevin Harvick	Stewart–Haas Racing	Chevrolet	70.652	
16	24	Chase Elliott (R)	Hendrick Motorsports	Chevrolet	70.747	
17	41	Kurt Busch	Stewart–Haas Racing	Chevrolet	70.795	
18	3	Austin Dillon	Richard Childress Racing	Chevrolet	70.804	
19	21	Ryan Blaney (R)	Wood Brothers Racing	Ford	70.810	
20	13	Casey Mears	Germain Racing	Chevrolet	70.825	
21	88	Jeff Gordon	Hendrick Motorsports	Chevrolet	70.866	
22	98	Cole Whitt	Premium Motorsports	Toyota	70.975	
23	5	Kasey Kahne	Hendrick Motorsports	Chevrolet	70.987	
24	16	Greg Biffle	Roush Fenway Racing	Ford	71.038	
25	34	Chris Buescher (R)	Front Row Racing	Ford	71.060	
26	23	David Ragan	BK Racing	Toyota	71.220	
27	44	Brian Scott (R)	Richard Petty Motorsports	Ford	71.340	
28	15	Clint Bowyer	HScott Motorsports	Chevrolet	71.438	
29	7	Regan Smith	Tommy Baldwin Racing	Chevrolet	71.443	
30	17	Ricky Stenhouse Jr	Roush Fenway Racing	Ford	71.448	
31	10	Danica Patrick	Stewart–Haas Racing	Chevrolet	71.481	
32	6	Trevor Bayne	Roush Fenway Racing	Ford	71.502	
33	27	Paul Menard	Richard Childress Racing	Chevrolet	71.616	
34	43	Aric Almirola	Richard Petty Motorsports	Ford	71.643	
35	83	Matt DiBenedetto	BK Racing	Toyota	71.927	
36	55	Alex Kennedy	Premium Motorsports	Chevrolet	72.181	
37	32	Boris Said	GO FAS Racing	Ford	72.202	
38	46	Michael Annett	HScott Motorsports	Chevrolet	72.771	
39	30	Josh Wise	The Motorsports Group	Chevrolet	73.965	
40	38	Landon Cassill	Front Row Racing	Ford	0.000	
Official qualifying results

== Race ==
=== First half ===
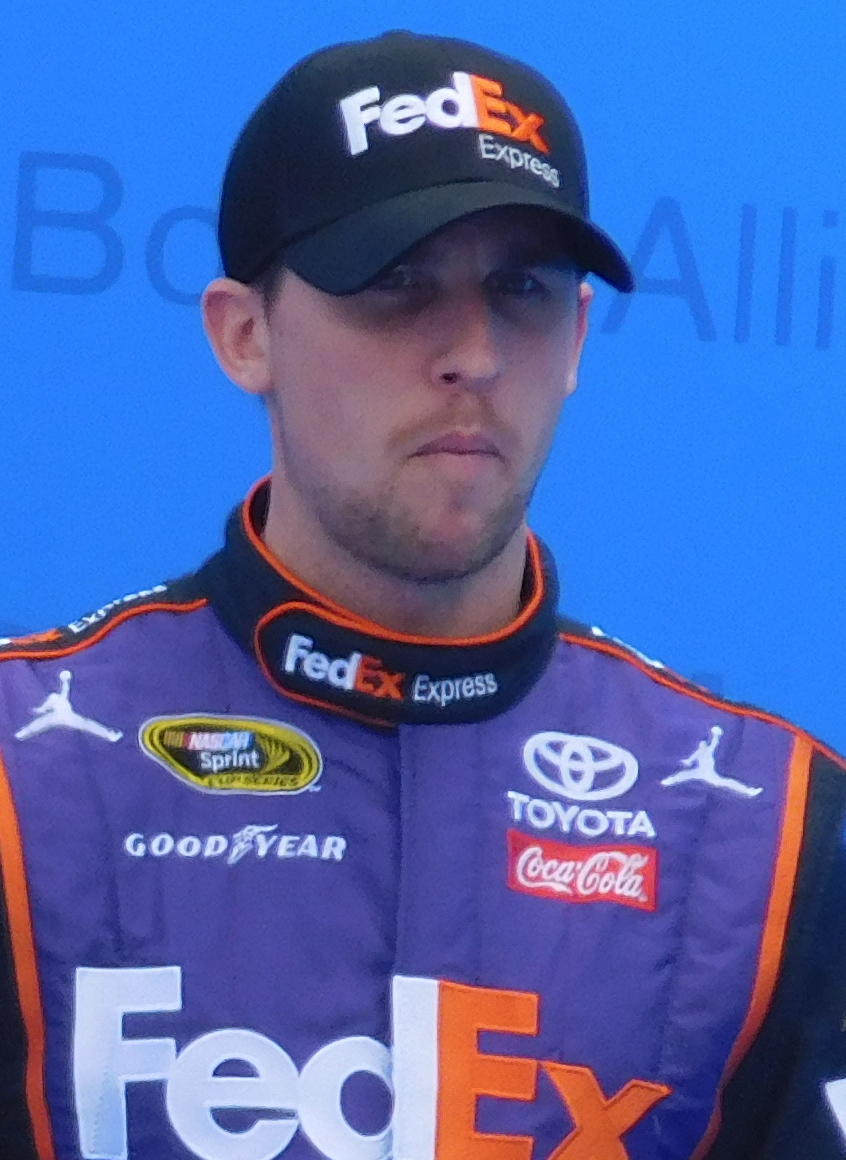
Denny Hamlin won the race.

Under clear blue New York skies, Carl Edwards led the field to the green flag at 2:53 p.m. The race proceeded orderly for the first five laps before Jeff Gordon sent Austin Dillon spinning in the inner loop on the fifth lap. The race continued under green. Debris in the outer loop brought out the first caution of the race on lap 11. The debris was a piece of hose. A few cars opted to pit under the caution. Aric Almirola and Kasey Kahne were tagged for their crews being over the wall too soon, and Regan Smith was tagged for speeding. All three restarted from the tail end of the field.

The race restarted on lap 16. Michael Annett overshot the inner loop, but continued on and was subsequently forced to serve a pass through penalty. A number of cars began pitting on lap 22. Jimmie Johnson was tagged for an uncontrolled tire and speeding. Ryan Blaney was tagged for speeding. Both were forced to serve a pass through penalty. Edwards pitted from the lead on lap 26 and handed the lead to Martin Truex Jr. Edwards was tagged for an outside tire violation and A. J. Allmendinger was tagged for speeding. Both were forced to serve pass through penalties. Truex pitted on lap 27 and handed the lead to Joey Logano. He pitted on lap 33 and handed the lead to Danica Patrick. He was tagged for speeding on pit road and was forced to serve a pass through penalty. She made her stop at lap 45 and the lead cycled to Kyle Busch.

=== Second half ===
The second caution of the race flew on lap 47 for a rogue tire on pit road. It came from the No. 83 of Matt DiBenedetto. Kurt Busch opted not to pit under the caution and assumed the lead. Chris Buescher and Paul Menard were tagged for their crews throwing equipment and restarted the race from the tail end of the field.

The race restarted on lap 53. Logano passed Busch climbing the esses to retake the lead. The third caution of the race flew on the same lap for a multi-car wreck on the shot chute. Exiting the outer loop, Ricky Stenhouse Jr. got loose and slid across the track into the guardrail. He bounced back and was t-boned by Johnson. Dillon, trying to avoid him, got into Greg Biffle and sent him into the guardrail. "The cars started checking up in front of me and they all moved out of the way and the 17 (Stenhouse) was sitting there, stopped," Johnson said. "I remember seeing a door number and I was so thankful it was the passenger-side door and not the driver-side door because I plowed him. I really hit the car hard. I was afraid that I might have injured him. But, thankfully he’s okay and everybody is all right." Johnson would go on to finish 40th, his first last-place finish of his career. The red flag was displayed for cleanup on the track. After 13 minutes and 19 seconds, it was lifted and the race was continued under caution.

The race restarted with 34 laps to go with Brad Keselowski in the lead. The fourth caution of the race flew for a multi-car wreck in the outer loop. It started when Ryan Newman got loose and turned David Ragan around, and also collected Clint Bowyer, Edwards and Alex Kennedy.

The race restarted with 31 laps to go. Landon Cassill went through the grass in the inner loop and spun out. The race remained green but then the fifth caution of the race came out with 26 laps to go for debris in the inner loop.

The race restarted with 23 laps to go. The sixth caution of the race came out with 15 laps to go for Kennedy losing an engine on the frontstretch.

The race restarted with 10 laps to go. Keselowski got in too hot into turn 1 and went into the runoff area. He lost the lead to Denny Hamlin as the seventh caution of the race flew for a two-car spin at the bottom of the esses involving DiBenedetto and Newman.

The race restarted with seven laps to go. The eighth caution of the race flew for a multi-car wreck in the outer loop. Exiting the inner loop, Buscher's car threw up a rooster tail of smoke and caused Menard to slow down. Kevin Harvick slowed down, rammed into him, got turned by Brian Scott and was rammed by Ragan. The red flag was displayed for the second time. After 16 minutes and 44 seconds, it was lifted and the race was continued under caution.

The race restarted with four laps to go. Exiting turn 11 on the final lap, Keselowski got into the back of Truex and sent him spinning, at which point Rick Allen yelled out "Aggressive goes around!" . Keselowski said after the race that he "went high and the 78 went high and by then I was already deep in the corner and got into him and turned him. That was really unfortunate and the last thing I wanted to see. This track here, when you drive into the corner, you commit and sometimes you don't know what will happen when you commit. The last thing I wanted to do was turn him." Truex said that what happened was "definitely unfortunate. I wish we could've seen what would've happened when we got to the start-finish line. I felt like I maybe had (winner Denny Hamlin) squared up a little bit off turn 11 and maybe could've drag raced him to the line. It'd have been fun to see, but it was all not to be with getting hit in the left rear. It's unfortunate, but it was hard racing at the end, all of us going for a win and all of us locked in the Chase. I guess (Keselowski) kind of races with that mentality, that 'Hey, it doesn't really matter where we finish or if we finish,' so I just have to be mindful of that when we're around him for the rest of the time." Allmendinger hopped the curb, hit Larson and sent him crashing into the inside wall. "Our last corner there, racing with Kyle I just... I can’t sorry enough [sic]," Allmendinger said after the race. "It doesn’t help the case, I spun him out. I didn’t mean to spin him out. The No. 78 was spinning and I was starting to get my nose under Kyle to try to drag race him to the checkered. He was turning to come back down, but it was my fault. For fourth place it would be different if we were battling for the win, but I just hate it for him. It’s not going to help to say sorry, I know, I would be [ticked] off. He should be. I was going to be okay with that until that." Larson responded by saying Allmendinger "had already ran me down to the front stretch wall once with about 15 to go or so. Pretty dumb move right there too, but I was the smarter one racing for points, lifted, could have wrecked him, but didn’t. I don’t know. I don’t know. He wrecked me earlier in the year at Vegas. He has ran me hard, but we always race pretty well, but today was flat out stupid. I love his crew chief (Randall Burnett) to death; he was our engineer last year. It just sucks they are going to have to start building some more race cars because he has got a few coming." Hamlin was ahead of all this and scored the victory.

== Post-race ==
=== Driver comments ===
Hamlin said afterwards that winning his first road course race "means a lot. I can’t tell you how disappointed I was we didn’t win the first one. I just tried the best I could and overshot the corner and I didn’t want to do it this time and so I probably under drove and let those guys be a little closer than I should’ve."

In his media availability following his runner-up finish, Logano said of the finish – be it the final lap or the final 15 laps – were "crazy anyway you look at it. Typical Watkins Glen. I mean, it’s just awesome, crazy racing, full contact. Just insane out there. So a lot of fun from the driver’s seat and I’m sure the fans loved it as well in front of a sold‑out grandstand. It was pretty cool when I pulled over for the red flag in front of the grandstands and I could hear just fans screaming and yelling and loving it. I thought, Man, this is really cool to be in the driver’s seat right now. Having those moments, I thought it was neat."

Following a fifth-place finish in his final road course race of his career, Tony Stewart said he was "just happy I’m not one of the guys who got tore up out there. The crazy part is what happens at the road courses. Everyone just seems to be putting themselves in bad positions they can’t get out of, and that’s how it ends up the way it does. There were guys who had Top 5 going into the last lap who couldn’t finish so we’ll take it.’’

== Race results ==
Pos	No.	Driver	Team	Manufacturer	Laps	Points
1	11	Denny Hamlin	Joe Gibbs Racing	Toyota	90	44
2	22	Joey Logano	Team Penske	Ford	90	40
3	2	Brad Keselowski	Team Penske	Ford	90	40
4	47	A. J. Allmendinger	JTG Daugherty Racing	Chevrolet	90	37
5	14	Tony Stewart	Stewart–Haas Racing	Chevrolet	90	36
6	18	Kyle Busch	Joe Gibbs Racing	Toyota	90	36
7	78	Martin Truex Jr.	Furniture Row Racing	Toyota	90	35
8	1	Jamie McMurray	Chip Ganassi Racing	Chevrolet	90	33
9	6	Trevor Bayne	Roush Fenway Racing	Ford	90	32
10	20	Matt Kenseth	Joe Gibbs Racing	Toyota	90	31
11	41	Kurt Busch	Stewrt-Haas Racing	Chevrolet	90	31
12	13	Casey Mears	Germain Racing	Chevrolet	90	29
13	24	Chase Elliott (R)	Hendrick Motorsports	Chevrolet	90	28
14	88	Jeff Gordon	Hendrick Motorsports	Chevrolet	90	27
15	19	Carl Edwards	Joe Gibbs Racing	Toyota	90	27
16	31	Ryan Newman	Richard Childress Racing	Chevrolet	90	25
17	95	Michael McDowell	Circle Sport-Leavine Family Racing	Chevrolet	90	24
18	15	Clint Bowyer	HScott Motorsports	Chevrolet	90	23
19	21	Ryan Blaney (R)	Wood Brothers	Ford	90	22
20	5	Kasey Kahne	Hendrick Motorsports	Chevrolet	90	21
21	10	Danica Patrick	Stewart–Haas Racing	Chevrolet	90	21
22	27	Paul Menard	Richard Childress Racing	Chevrolet	90	19
23	38	Landon Cassill	Front Row Motorsports	Ford	90	18
24	32	Boris Said	FAS Lane Racing	Ford	90	17
25	44	Brian Scott (R)	Richard Petty Motorsports	Ford	90	16
26	30	Josh Wise	The Motorsports Group	Chevrolet	90	15
27	43	Aric Almirola	Richard Petty Motorsports	Ford	90	14
28	98	Cole Whitt	Identity Ventures Racing	Toyota	90	13
29	42	Kyle Larson	Chip Ganassi Racing	Chevrolet	89	12
30	34	Chris Buescher (R)	Front Row Motorsports	Ford	89	11
31	3	Austin Dillon	Richard Childress Racing	Chevrolet	89	10
32	4	Kevin Harvick	Stewart–Haas Racing	Chevrolet	83	9
33	23	David Ragan	BK Racing	Toyota	83	8
34	83	Matt DiBenedetto	BK Racing	Toyota	83	7
35	7	Regan Smith	Tommy Baldwin Racing	Chevrolet	77	6
36	55	Alex Kennedy	Premium Motorsports	Chevrolet	76	5
37	46	Michael Annett	HScott Motorsports	Chevrolet	74	4
38	17	Ricky Stenhouse Jr.	Roush Fenway Racing	Ford	52	3
39	16	Greg Biffle	Roush Fenway Racing	Ford	52	2
40	48	Jimmie Johnson	Hendrick Motorsports	Chevrolet	52	1
Official race results

=== Race summary ===
- Lead changes: 9 among different drivers
- Cautions/Laps: 8 for 20
- Red flags: 2 for 30 minutes and 3 seconds
- Time of race: 2 hours, 27 minutes and 48 seconds
- Average speed: 89.513 miles per hour (144.057 km/h)

== Media ==
=== Television ===
NBC Sports assigned the race to USA Network, as a result of Summer Olympic coverage on the primary channels used by the NBCUniversal group (during the time, USA also carried the Mid-Ohio Xfinity race and Premier League matches that typically air on NBC, NBCSN, or CNBC). Rick Allen, Jeff Burton and Steve Letarte had the call in the booth for the race. Dave Burns, Parker Kligerman, Mike Massaro and Marty Snider reported from pit lane during the race. It was the first NASCAR race broadcast on USA since 1984, but the first under Comcast ownership and under the NBC Sports banner. It is expected that USA will carry races in 2020 and 2024, as under the 2015 NASCAR television contract, the same conflict with the Olympics will happen. When Martin Truex Jr spun on the last lap, lead commentator Rick Allen made the call “aggressive goes around!”. The call has become a meme in the NASCAR community ever since then.

NBC Sports Group / USA Network
Booth announcers	Pit reporters
Lap-by-lap: Rick Allen; Color-commentator: Jeff Burton; Color-commentator: Steve Letarte	Dave Burns; Parker Kligerman; Mike Massaro; Marty Snider

=== Radio ===
Motor Racing Network had the radio call for the race, which was simulcast on Sirius XM NASCAR Radio.

MRN
Booth announcers	Turn announcers	Pit reporters
Lead announcer: Joe Moore; Announcer: Jeff Striegle; Announcer: Rusty Wallace	Esses: Dave Moody; Turn 5: Mike Bagley; Turn 10 & 11: Kyle Rickey	Alex Hayden; Winston Kelley; Steve Post

== Standings after the race ==
Drivers' Championship standings
	Pos	Manufacturer	Points
1	1	Brad Keselowski	727
1	2	Kevin Harvick	718 (–9)
	3	Kurt Busch	689 (–38)
	4	Kyle Busch	670 (–57)
	5	Carl Edwards	653 (–74)
	6	Joey Logano	652 (–75)
2	7	Denny Hamlin	620 (–107)
	8	Martin Truex Jr.	612 (–115)
1	9	Matt Kenseth	600 (–127)
3	10	Jimmie Johnson	578 (–149)
1	11	Ryan Newman	562 (–165)
1	12	Chase Elliott	561 (–166)
2	13	Austin Dillon	559 (–168)
	14	Jamie McMurray	550 (–177)
	15	Kyle Larson	520 (–207)
1	16	Trevor Bayne	512 (–215)
Official drivers' standings

Manufacturers' Championship standings
Pos	Manufacturer	Points
1	Toyota	910
2	Chevrolet	875 (–35)
3	Ford	843 (–67)
Official manufacturer's standings

- Note: Only the first 16 positions are included for the driver standings.
  . – Driver has clinched a position in the Chase for the Sprint Cup.

Previous race: 2016 Pennsylvania 400	Sprint Cup Series; 2016 season	Next race: 2016 Bass Pro Shops NRA Night Race
