= 2014 Quaker State 400 =

Race details
- Race 17 of 36 in the 2014 NASCAR Sprint Cup Series
- The 2014 Quaker State 400 program cover. "The Best Drivers Love It. Others Fear It."
- Date: June 28, 2014
- Location: Kentucky Speedway, Sparta, Kentucky
- Course: Permanent racing facility
- Course length: 1.5 miles (2.4 km)
- Distance: 267 laps, 400.5 mi (644.542 km)
- Weather: Partly cloudy with a high temperature around 81 °F (27 °C); wind out of the ESE at 7 miles per hour (11 km/h)
- Average speed: 139.723 mph (224.862 km/h)

Pole position
Driver	Brad Keselowski	Team Penske
- Time: 28.603

Most laps led
Driver	Brad Keselowski	Team Penske
- Laps: 199

Winner
No. 2	Brad Keselowski	Team Penske

Television in the United States
- Network: TNT & PRN
- Announcers: Adam Alexander, Wally Dallenbach Jr. and Kyle Petty (Television); Doug Rice and Mark Garrow (Booth); Rob Albright (1 & 2) and Brad Gillie (3 & 4) (Turns) (Radio)
- Nielsen ratings: 2.3/5; 3.6 Million viewers

The 2014 Quaker State 400 presented by Advance Auto Parts was a NASCAR Sprint Cup Series stock car race held on June 28, 2014, at Kentucky Speedway in Sparta, Kentucky. Contested over 267 laps on the 1.5-mile (2.4 km) tri-oval, it was the 17th race of the 2014 NASCAR Sprint Cup Series. Brad Keselowski led 199 laps during the race, to take his second win of the season. Kyle Busch finished second, while Ryan Newman, Matt Kenseth, and Dale Earnhardt Jr. rounded out the top five. The top rookies of the race were Austin Dillon (16th), Michael Annett (18th), and Justin Allgaier (24th).

== Report ==
=== Entry list ===
The entry list for the Quaker State 400 was released on Monday, June 23, 2014, at 9:09 a.m. Eastern time. Only 42 cars entered the race, which made this the first Sprint Cup Series race without a full field of 43 drivers since the 2001 New Hampshire 300 at New Hampshire Motor Speedway. NASCAR's senior director of communications Kerry Tharp denied that there was any "magic" to a 43-car grid, and also noted how well the sport had been progressing with an improvement in competition. Hendrick Motorsports drivers Jimmie Johnson and Jeff Gordon backed up Tharp's words, with both drivers unconcerned about the lack of a full grid. While the field expanded to 43 on June 27 after BK Racing entered Mike Bliss in the No. 93, J. J. Yeley and Xxxtreme Motorsport withdrew later in the day, citing "internal politics".

No.	Driver	Team	Manufacturer
1	Jamie McMurray	Chip Ganassi Racing	Chevrolet
2	Brad Keselowski (PC2)	Team Penske	Ford
3	Austin Dillon (R)	Richard Childress Racing	Chevrolet
4	Kevin Harvick	Stewart–Haas Racing	Chevrolet
5	Kasey Kahne	Hendrick Motorsports	Chevrolet
7	Michael Annett (R)	Tommy Baldwin Racing	Chevrolet
9	Marcos Ambrose	Richard Petty Motorsports	Ford
10	Danica Patrick	Stewart–Haas Racing	Chevrolet
11	Denny Hamlin	Joe Gibbs Racing	Toyota
13	Casey Mears	Germain Racing	Chevrolet
14	Tony Stewart (PC3)	Stewart–Haas Racing	Chevrolet
15	Clint Bowyer	Michael Waltrip Racing	Toyota
16	Greg Biffle	Roush Fenway Racing	Ford
17	Ricky Stenhouse Jr.	Roush Fenway Racing	Ford
18	Kyle Busch	Joe Gibbs Racing	Toyota
20	Matt Kenseth (PC5)	Joe Gibbs Racing	Toyota
22	Joey Logano	Team Penske	Ford
23	Alex Bowman (R)	BK Racing	Toyota
24	Jeff Gordon (PC6)	Hendrick Motorsports	Chevrolet
26	Cole Whitt (R)	BK Racing	Toyota
27	Paul Menard	Richard Childress Racing	Chevrolet
31	Ryan Newman	Richard Childress Racing	Chevrolet
32	Travis Kvapil	Go FAS Racing	Ford
33	David Stremme	Circle Sport	Chevrolet
34	David Ragan	Front Row Motorsports	Ford
36	Reed Sorenson	Tommy Baldwin Racing	Chevrolet
38	David Gilliland	Front Row Motorsports	Ford
40	Landon Cassill (i)	Circle Sport	Chevrolet
41	Kurt Busch (PC4)	Stewart–Haas Racing	Chevrolet
42	Kyle Larson (R)	Chip Ganassi Racing	Chevrolet
43	Aric Almirola	Richard Petty Motorsports	Ford
47	A. J. Allmendinger	JTG Daugherty Racing	Chevrolet
48	Jimmie Johnson (PC1)	Hendrick Motorsports	Chevrolet
51	Justin Allgaier (R)	HScott Motorsports	Chevrolet
55	Brian Vickers	Michael Waltrip Racing	Toyota
66	Joe Nemechek	Michael Waltrip Racing	Toyota
78	Martin Truex Jr.	Furniture Row Racing	Chevrolet
83	Ryan Truex (R)	BK Racing	Toyota
88	Dale Earnhardt Jr.	Hendrick Motorsports	Chevrolet
93	Mike Bliss	BK Racing	Toyota
98	Josh Wise	Phil Parsons Racing	Chevrolet
99	Carl Edwards	Roush Fenway Racing	Ford
Official entry list

Key	Meaning
(R)	Rookie
(i)	Ineligible for points
(PC#)	Past champions provisional

== Practice ==
=== First practice ===
Kyle Larson was the fastest in the first practice session with a lap time of 29.420 and a speed of 183.549 mph (295.393 km/h).

Pos	No.	Driver	Team	Manufacturer	Time	Speed
1	42	Kyle Larson (R)	Chip Ganassi Racing	Chevrolet	29.420	183.549
2	2	Brad Keselowski	Team Penske	Ford	29.647	182.143
3	55	Brian Vickers	Michael Waltrip Racing	Toyota	29.647	182.143
Official first practice results

=== Final practice ===
Brad Keselowski was the fastest in the final practice session with a lap time of 29.492 and a speed of 183.101 mph (294.672 km/h).

Pos	No.	Driver	Team	Manufacturer	Time	Speed
1	2	Brad Keselowski	Team Penske	Ford	29.492	183.101
2	20	Matt Kenseth	Joe Gibbs Racing	Toyota	29.620	182.309
3	42	Kyle Larson (R)	Chip Ganassi Racing	Chevrolet	29.656	182.088
Official final practice results

== Qualifying ==
Brad Keselowski won the pole with a new track record lap time of 28.603 and a speed of 188.791 mph (303.830 km/h). Keselowski was surprised by the performance, having stated that he "thought we were all gonna be a lot slower", and that he would "want to go out there" and achieve the victory. Teammate Joey Logano joined Keselowski on the front row in a Team Penske lockout, in his 200th Cup start. Logano was disappointed to miss out on pole, bemoaning the new-for-2014 qualifying structure.

=== Qualifying results ===
Pos	No.	Driver	Team	Manufacturer	R1	R2	R3
1	2	Brad Keselowski	Team Penske	Ford	29.092	28.790	28.603
2	22	Joey Logano	Team Penske	Ford	29.049	28.783	28.850
3	24	Jeff Gordon	Hendrick Motorsports	Chevrolet	29.077	28.967	28.903
4	11	Denny Hamlin	Joe Gibbs Racing	Toyota	29.248	29.030	28.974
5	4	Kevin Harvick	Stewart–Haas Racing	Chevrolet	29.322	29.028	29.016
6	42	Kyle Larson (R)	Chip Ganassi Racing	Chevrolet	29.191	28.951	29.027
7	31	Ryan Newman	Richard Childress Racing	Chevrolet	29.256	29.030	29.030
8	1	Jamie McMurray	Chip Ganassi Racing	Chevrolet	29.099	29.014	29.039
9	41	Kurt Busch	Stewart–Haas Racing	Chevrolet	29.263	28.922	29.040
10	10	Danica Patrick	Stewart–Haas Racing	Chevrolet	29.070	29.048	29.063
11	15	Clint Bowyer	Michael Waltrip Racing	Toyota	29.353	28.918	29.124
12	27	Paul Menard	Richard Childress Racing	Chevrolet	29.307	29.048	29.174
13	14	Tony Stewart (Note: Tony Stewart started last, after a transmission change.)	Stewart–Haas Racing	Chevrolet	29.306	29.055	—
14	20	Matt Kenseth	Joe Gibbs Racing	Toyota	29.222	29.077	—
15	47	A. J. Allmendinger	JTG Daugherty Racing	Chevrolet	29.207	29.110	—
16	3	Austin Dillon (R)	Richard Childress Racing	Chevrolet	29.298	29.135	—
17	55	Brian Vickers	Michael Waltrip Racing	Toyota	29.269	29.174	—
18	18	Kyle Busch	Joe Gibbs Racing	Toyota	29.345	29.181	—
19	78	Martin Truex Jr.	Furniture Row Racing	Chevrolet	29.267	29.227	—
20	5	Kasey Kahne	Hendrick Motorsports	Chevrolet	29.348	29.274	—
21	17	Ricky Stenhouse Jr.	Roush Fenway Racing	Ford	29.381	29.299	—
22	43	Aric Almirola	Richard Petty Motorsports	Ford	29.351	29.300	—
23	99	Carl Edwards	Roush Fenway Racing	Ford	29.391	29.331	—
24	16	Greg Biffle	Roush Fenway Racing	Ford	29.394	29.486	—
25	48	Jimmie Johnson	Hendrick Motorsports	Chevrolet	29.402	—	—
26	13	Casey Mears	Germain Racing	Chevrolet	29.440	—	—
27	9	Marcos Ambrose	Richard Petty Motorsports	Ford	29.482	—	—
28	51	Justin Allgaier (R)	HScott Motorsports	Chevrolet	29.538	—	—
29	88	Dale Earnhardt Jr.	Hendrick Motorsports	Chevrolet	29.540	—	—
30	26	Cole Whitt (R)	BK Racing	Toyota	29.544	—	—
31	36	Reed Sorenson	Tommy Baldwin Racing	Chevrolet	29.684	—	—
32	7	Michael Annett (R)	Tommy Baldwin Racing	Chevrolet	29.758	—	—
33	23	Alex Bowman (R)	BK Racing	Toyota	29.787	—	—
34	98	Josh Wise	Phil Parsons Racing	Chevrolet	29.802	—	—
35	32	Travis Kvapil	Go FAS Racing	Ford	29.930	—	—
36	34	David Ragan	Front Row Motorsports	Ford	30.050	—	—
37	40	Landon Cassill	Circle Sport	Chevrolet	30.109	—	—
38	33	David Stremme	Circle Sport	Chevrolet	30.223	—	—
39	83	Ryan Truex (R)	BK Racing	Toyota	30.268	—	—
40	66	Joe Nemechek	Identity Ventures Racing	Toyota	30.326	—	—
41	38	David Gilliland	Front Row Motorsports	Ford	30.543	—	—
42	93	Mike Bliss	BK Racing	Toyota	31.508	—	—
Qualifying Results

== Race ==
=== First half ===
==== Start ====
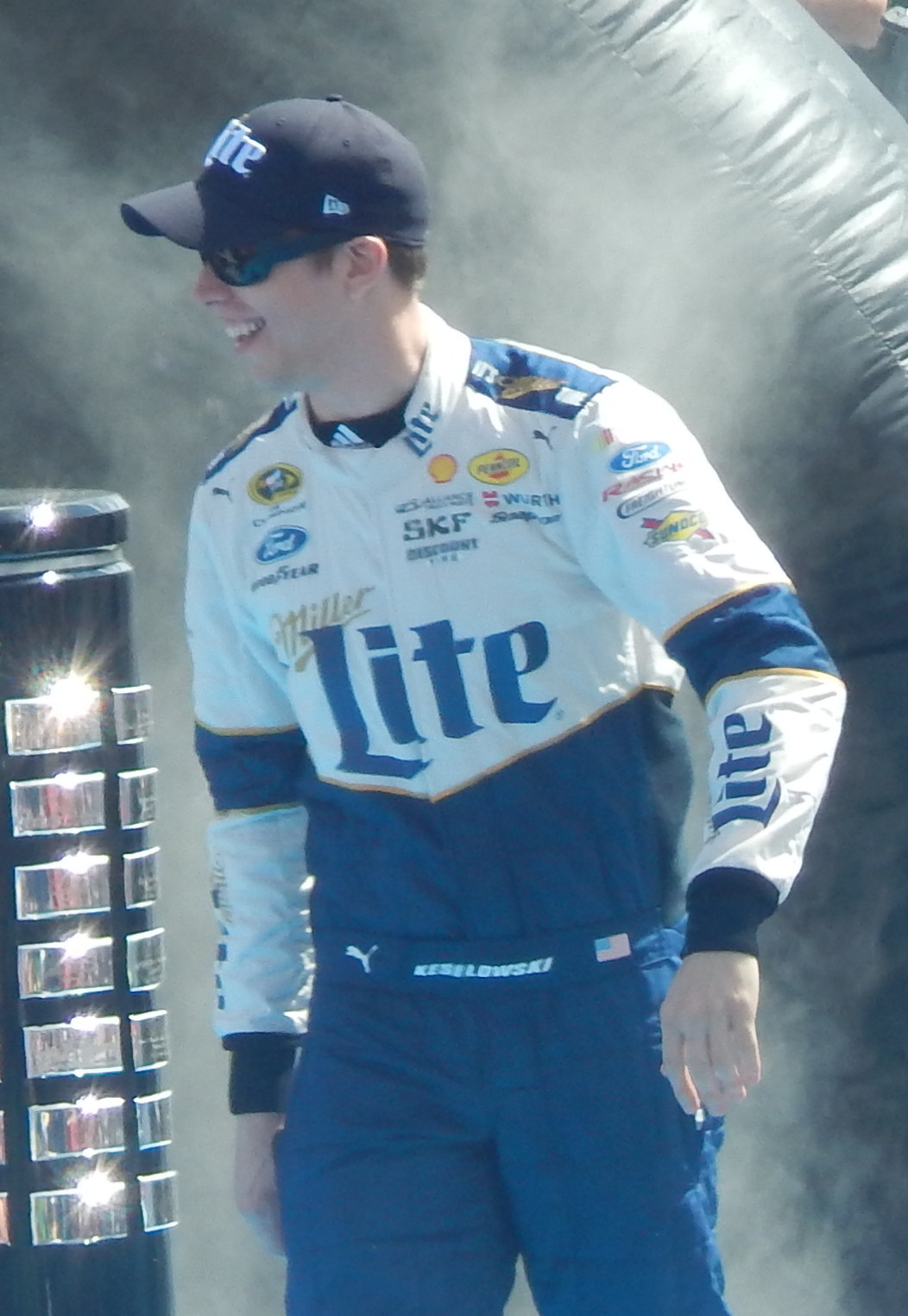
Brad Keselowski won the race from the pole position.

Prior to the start of the race, there was a downpour that soaked the track. This prompted NASCAR to schedule a competition caution at lap 30. The race was scheduled to start at 7:45 p.m. Eastern time but started three minutes earlier with Brad Keselowski leading the field to the green flag. Jeff Gordon slipped on the start and fell to eighth. Just ahead of the scheduled competition caution, Denny Hamlin hit the wall in turn three after a tire blowout, and caused the first caution of the race. Hamlin described his impact as "definitely a lot easier than some of the hits I've taken in the past", but was uninjured in the incident. Keselowski led the field to the green on the restart on lap 35, starting a lengthy green-flag run, before the race's second caution on lap 77, caused by Kyle Larson hitting the wall in turn 1. Joey Logano took the lead from teammate Keselowski during the cycle of pit stops.

==== Team Penske show ====
Logano led the field to the restart on lap 85, before Keselowski was able to retake the lead two laps later. Another lengthy green-flag run ensued, before debris forced the third caution of the race on lap 126. Prior to the caution, Matt Kenseth suffered a flat right-front tire, and had to pit from sixth position. Logano retook the lead during the pit cycle, while Jeff Gordon suffered a slow pit stop due to a malfunctioning air hose; he lost a total of 16 positions, dropping from 7th to 23rd. Logano and Keselowski swapped the lead positions once again, prior to the fourth caution, on lap 153, for a multi-car wreck on the backstretch involving Aric Almirola, Alex Bowman, Kasey Kahne and Jamie McMurray. Bowman locked up his brakes and tires, causing a large cloud of smoke that made it difficult for trailing cars to see what was in front of them. When the smoke cleared, Almirola swerved to his right to avoid Bowman, but in the process got into the left side of McMurray's car.

=== Second half ===
==== Final laps ====
The race restarted on lap 161 with Logano leading the field, but Keselowski was back in front a couple of laps later, holding the lead until the fifth caution on lap 176, which was brought out by David Stremme, who spun in turn 4. Logano took the lead on the restart on lap 182, but Keselowski repeated his feat of passing Logano within the first few laps of the restart. Aric Almirola brought out the sixth caution on lap 214 when he hit the wall in turn 1. Kyle Busch took the lead during the cycle; he was the only driver other than the Penske drivers to lead laps during the event, leading 31. Keselowski took the lead from Busch with 20 laps to go and took the checkered flag for the second time in 2014. Keselowski described his car as "awesome" and praised his team for doing a great job". Busch was pleased at his upturn in performance, stating that his car was "a lot better than we've been all year long", but that it had "got so loose there at the end". He was still able to finish in second place, just over a second behind Keselowski.

=== Race results ===
Pos	No.	Driver	Team	Manufacturer	Laps	Points
1	2	Brad Keselowski	Team Penske	Ford	267	48
2	18	Kyle Busch	Joe Gibbs Racing	Toyota	267	43
3	31	Ryan Newman	Richard Childress Racing	Chevrolet	267	41
4	20	Matt Kenseth	Joe Gibbs Racing	Toyota	267	40
5	88	Dale Earnhardt Jr.	Hendrick Motorsports	Chevrolet	267	39
6	24	Jeff Gordon	Hendrick Motorsports	Chevrolet	267	38
7	4	Kevin Harvick	Stewart–Haas Racing	Chevrolet	267	37
8	5	Kasey Kahne	Hendrick Motorsports	Chevrolet	267	36
9	22	Joey Logano	Team Penske	Ford	267	36
10	48	Jimmie Johnson	Hendrick Motorsports	Chevrolet	267	34
11	14	Tony Stewart	Stewart–Haas Racing	Chevrolet	267	33
12	41	Kurt Busch	Stewart–Haas Racing	Chevrolet	267	32
13	9	Marcos Ambrose	Richard Petty Motorsports	Ford	267	31
14	16	Greg Biffle	Roush Fenway Racing	Ford	267	30
15	27	Paul Menard	Richard Childress Racing	Chevrolet	267	29
16	3	Austin Dillon (R)	Richard Childress Racing	Chevrolet	267	28
17	99	Carl Edwards	Roush Fenway Racing	Ford	267	27
18	7	Michael Annett (R)	Tommy Baldwin Racing	Chevrolet	267	26
19	78	Martin Truex Jr.	Furniture Row Racing	Chevrolet	267	25
20	13	Casey Mears	Germain Racing	Chevrolet	267	24
21	10	Danica Patrick	Stewart–Haas Racing	Chevrolet	267	23
22	47	A. J. Allmendinger	JTG Daugherty Racing	Chevrolet	266	22
23	15	Clint Bowyer	Michael Waltrip Racing	Toyota	266	21
24	51	Justin Allgaier (R)	HScott Motorsports	Chevrolet	266	20
25	17	Ricky Stenhouse Jr.	Roush Fenway Racing	Ford	266	19
26	55	Brian Vickers	Michael Waltrip Racing	Toyota	266	18
27	36	Reed Sorenson	Tommy Baldwin Racing	Chevrolet	265	17
28	26	Cole Whitt (R)	BK Racing	Toyota	264	16
29	98	Josh Wise	Phil Parsons Racing	Chevrolet	263	15
30	38	David Gilliland	Front Row Motorsports	Ford	263	14
31	34	David Ragan	Front Row Motorsports	Ford	262	13
32	40	Landon Cassill	Circle Sport	Chevrolet	262	0
33	83	Ryan Truex (R)	BK Racing	Toyota	261	11
34	32	Travis Kvapil	Go FAS Racing	Ford	259	10
35	33	David Stremme	Circle Sport	Chevrolet	257	9
36	23	Alex Bowman (R)	BK Racing	Toyota	255	8
37	1	Jamie McMurray	Chip Ganassi Racing	Chevrolet	250	7
38	66	Joe Nemechek	Identity Ventures Racing	Toyota	239	0
39	43	Aric Almirola	Richard Petty Motorsports	Ford	175	5
40	42	Kyle Larson (R)	Chip Ganassi Racing	Chevrolet	75	4
41	93	Mike Bliss	BK Racing	Toyota	30	0
42	11	Denny Hamlin	Joe Gibbs Racing	Toyota	27	2
Race Results

=== Race statistics ===
Lead changes	Cautions	Laps	Red flags	Time of race	Average speed
12	6	34	0	2:51:59	139.723 miles per hour (224.862 km/h)

== Media ==
=== Television ===
TNT Sports
Booth announcers	Pit reporters
Lap-by-lap: Adam Alexander; Color-commentator: Wally Dallenbach Jr. Color commentator: Kyle Petty	Matt Yocum; Marty Snider; Chris Neville; Ralph Sheheen

=== Radio ===
PRN Radio
Booth announcers	Turn announcers	Pit reporters
Lead announcer: Doug Rice; Announcer: Mark Garrow	Turns 1 & 2: Rob Albright; Turns 3 & 4: Pat Patterson	Brett McMillan; Steve Richards; Jim Noble; Wendy Venturini

== Standings after the race ==
Drivers' Championship standings

	Pos	Driver	Points
	1	Jeff Gordon	618
	2	Jimmie Johnson	594 (−24)
	3	Dale Earnhardt Jr.	594 (−24)
1	4	Brad Keselowski	560 (−58)
1	5	Matt Kenseth	555 (−63)
	6	Carl Edwards	536 (−82)
	7	Joey Logano	519 (−99)
	8	Ryan Newman	514 (−104)
	9	Kevin Harvick	509 (−109)
1	10	Kyle Busch	508 (−110)
1	11	Paul Menard	488 (−130)
2	12	Kyle Larson (R)	474 (−144)
2	13	Greg Biffle	474 (−144)
	14	Clint Bowyer	473 (−145)
1	15	Kasey Kahne	465 (−153)
1	16	Tony Stewart	460 (−158)

Manufacturers' Championship standings

Pos	Manufacturer	Points
1	Chevrolet	763
2	Ford	739 (−24)
3	Toyota	638 (−125)

- Note: Only the first sixteen positions are included for the driver standings.

== Notes ==
Previous race: 2014 Toyota/Save Mart 350	Sprint Cup Series; 2014 season	Next race: 2014 Coke Zero 400
