= Eddie MacDonald =

American racing driver (born 1980)

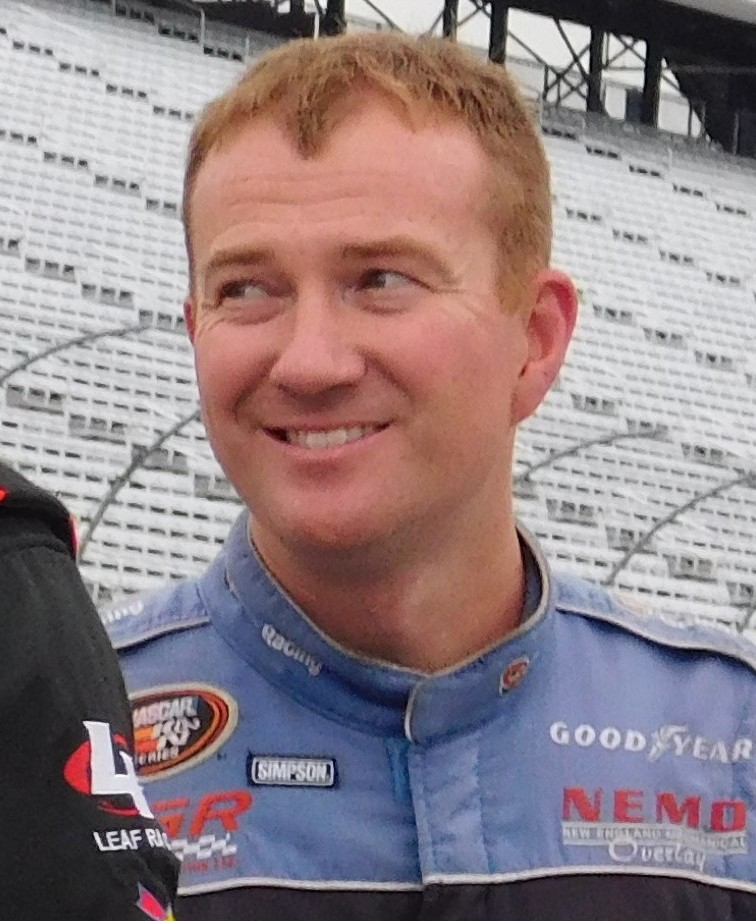
- MacDonald in 2017
- Born: Edward MacDonald; July 7, 1980 (age 46) Rowley, Massachusetts, U.S.

NASCAR K&N Pro Series East career
- Debut season: 2001
- Car number: 17MA, 71
- Crew chief: Rollie Lachance
- Former teams: HRM Motorsports, Jerry Morello, Grimm Racing, Calabrese Motorsports
- Starts: 196
- Wins: 7
- Poles: 2
- Best finish: 2nd in 2009
- Finished last season: 45th (2018)

Previous series
- 2007–2018 2005, 2009 2010: American Canadian Tour NASCAR Whelen Modified Tour NASCAR K&N Pro Series West

NASCAR Cup Series career
- 3 races run over 3 years
- 2016 position: 49th
- Best finish: 48th (2015)
- First race: 2014 Camping World RV Sales 301 (Loudon)
- Last race: 2016 New Hampshire 301 (Loudon)
Wins	Top tens	Poles
0	0	0

NASCAR O'Reilly Auto Parts Series career
- 2 races run over 2 years
- Best finish: 132nd (2009)
- First race: 2007 Camping World 200 presented by RVs.com (Loudon)
- Last race: 2009 Kroger On Track for the Cure 250 (Memphis)
Wins	Top tens	Poles
0	0	0

NASCAR FedEx Freight Truck Series career
- 1 race run over 1 year
- Best finish: 110th (2010)
- First race: 2010 TheRaceDayRaffleSeries.com 175 (Loudon)
Wins	Top tens	Poles
0	0	0
- Statistics up to date as of August 1, 2020.

Edward MacDonald (born July 7, 1980) is an American professional stock car racing driver. He most recently competed part-time in the NASCAR K&N Pro Series East in 2018, a series which he competed in for over a decade and a half. In addition, MacDonald raced numerous times in the American Canadian Tour between 2007 and 2018 (including two full seasons in 2016 and 2018), and in the PASS (Pro All Star Series) North. MacDonald has made starts in all three of NASCAR's national touring series, the K&N Pro Series East, and the Whelen Modified Tour.

Much of MacDonald's success has come at New Hampshire Motor Speedway, where he has five wins in the ACT, three in the Pro Series East, and one with the PASS (Pro All Star Series) North. MacDonald has also won at Bristol Motor Speedway. He is also a back-to-back, two-time champion of the Oxford 250, winning in 2009 and 2010; MacDonald is only one of three drivers to ever have consecutive wins at Oxford Plains Speedway.

He is nicknamed "The Outlaw".

== Racing career ==
=== Touring series ===
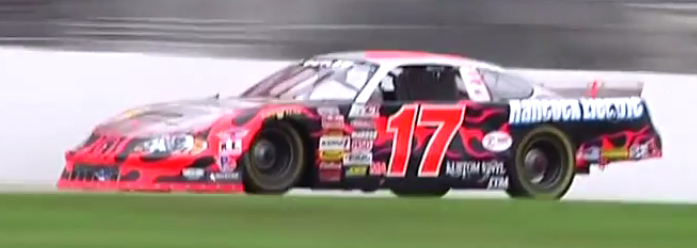
MacDonald's No. 17 ACT car in 2014

MacDonald first ran in the Busch East Series in 2001, finishing nineteenth in points, and claimed his first series win the following season at Beech Ridge Motor Speedway. After going winless in 2003 and 2004, MacDonald won at Thompson Speedway Motorsports Park; two years later, he would win at Stafford Speedway, and in 2008, won both races at New Hampshire Motor Speedway. In 2009, he won at Loudon again, finishing second in the championship to Ryan Truex. During the season, MacDonald won the Oxford 250 late model race at Oxford Plains Speedway; after electing to replace four tires on a pit stop with the threat of being lapped, MacDonald passed Brian Hoar on lap 167 to win. In 2014, MacDonald won his first Pro Series East race in five seasons and his seventh series win at Bristol Motor Speedway after holding off Gray Gaulding and Ben Rhodes on the green–white–checker finish.

In 2005, MacDonald made his debut in the Whelen Modified Tour at Loudon, finishing 37th. He returned to the Modifieds in 2009 at Loudon, replacing Andy Seuss, who was racing at Caraway Speedway in the Whelen Southern Modified Tour.

MacDonald ran and won the inaugural American Canadian Tour invitational race at Loudon in 2009, and repeated in 2011. In 2014, MacDonald won the ACT season-opener at Lee USA Speedway.

MacDonald is the most recent K&N East driver to have competed when the series had the Busch North name. He made a spot 2019 start in the ARCA Midwest Tour at the Milwaukee Mile and finished in the top-ten; it was the first stock car race in five years at the track.

MacDonald has been working with his crew chief Rollie Lachance since the early 2000s; Lachance previously worked with other big names in the New England short track circuit, including Tracy Gordon, Dale Shaw, and Kelly and Ryan Moore.

=== National series ===
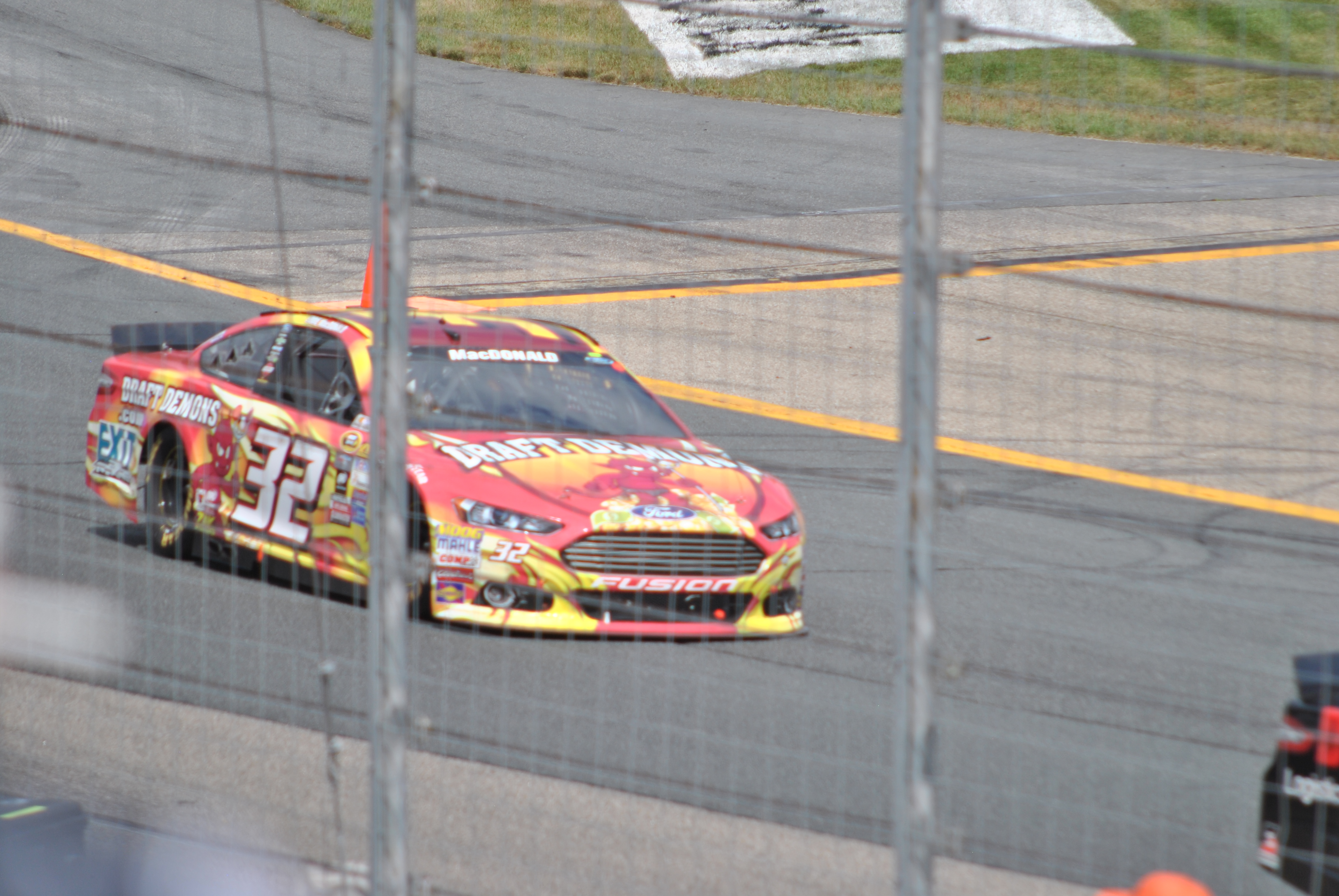
MacDonald's No. 32 Cup Series car at the 2015 5-hour Energy 301

In 2010, MacDonald made his Camping World Truck Series debut in the TheRaceDayRaffleSeries.com 175 at Loudon for Grimm Racing, finishing thirtieth after crashing on lap 86. In early 2014, Michael Alden, the owner of Blue Vase Marketing, a sponsor for Cup Series team Go FAS Racing, requested to Go FAS owner Archie St. Hilaire, another New Englander, to put a driver from New England in their No. 32 car for the Camping World RV Sales 301 at Loudon, which led to the team picking MacDonald. This made MacDonald the only active driver at the time to race in all five NASCAR touring series at the track (K&N East, Modified, and the three national series), and the first since Steve Park in 1996. To support MacDonald, the track offered an "Eddie Mac Pack" ticket package worth $32 (matching his car number). In his first Cup race, MacDonald started 40th and finished 35th, five laps down. MacDonald also ran the July Cup races at Loudon in 2015 and 2016.

== Personal life ==
MacDonald's parents, Red and Judy, owned Lee USA Speedway in Lee, New Hampshire. They sold the track in February 2018.

== Motorsports career results ==
=== NASCAR ===
(key) (Bold – Pole position awarded by qualifying time. Italics – Pole position earned by points standings or practice time. * – Most laps led.)

==== Sprint Cup Series ====
NASCAR Sprint Cup Series results
Year	Team	No.	Make	1	2	3	4	5	6	7	8	9	10	11	12	13	14	15	16	17	18	19	20	21	22	23	24	25	26	27	28	29	30	31	32	33	34	35	36	NSCC	Pts	Ref
2014	Go FAS Racing	32	Ford	DAY	PHO	LVS	BRI	CAL	MAR	TEX	DAR	RCH	TAL	KAN	CLT	DOV	POC	MCH	SON	KEN	DAY	NHA; 35	IND	POC	GLN	MCH	BRI	ATL	RCH	CHI	NHA	DOV	KAN	CLT	TAL	MAR	TEX	PHO	HOM	54th	9	
2015	Go FAS Racing	32	Ford	DAY	ATL	LVS	PHO	CAL	MAR	TEX	BRI	RCH	TAL	KAN	CLT	DOV	POC	MCH	SON	DAY	KEN	NHA; 37	IND	POC	GLN	MCH	BRI	DAR	RCH	CHI	NHA	DOV	CLT	KAN	TAL	MAR	TEX	PHO	HOM	48th	7	
2016	Go FAS Racing	32	Ford	DAY	ATL	LVS	PHO	CAL	MAR	TEX	BRI	RCH	TAL	KAN	DOV	CLT	POC	MCH	SON	DAY	KEN	NHA; 36	IND	POC	GLN	BRI	MCH	DAR	RCH	CHI	NHA	DOV	CLT	KAN	TAL	MAR	TEX	PHO	HOM	49th	5	

==== Nationwide Series ====
NASCAR Nationwide Series results
Year	Team	No.	Make	1	2	3	4	5	6	7	8	9	10	11	12	13	14	15	16	17	18	19	20	21	22	23	24	25	26	27	28	29	30	31	32	33	34	35	NNSC	Pts	Ref
2007	MacDonald Motorsports	71	Chevy	DAY	CAL	MXC	LVS	ATL	BRI	NSH	TEX	PHO	TAL	RCH	DAR	CLT	DOV	NSH	KEN	MLW	NHA; 41	DAY	CHI	GTY	IRP	CGV	GLN	MCH	BRI	CAL	RCH	DOV	KAN	CLT	MEM	TEX	PHO	HOM	152nd	40	
2009	Go Green Racing	39	Chevy	DAY	CAL	LVS	BRI	TEX	NSH	PHO	TAL	RCH	DAR	CLT	DOV	NSH	KEN	MLW	NHA	DAY	CHI	GTY	IRP	IOW	GLN	MCH	BRI	CGV	ATL	RCH	DOV	KAN	CAL	CLT	MEM; 22	TEX	PHO	HOM; DNQ	132nd	97	

==== Camping World Truck Series ====
NASCAR Camping World Truck Series results
Year	Team	No.	Make	1	2	3	4	5	6	7	8	9	10	11	12	13	14	15	16	17	18	19	20	21	22	23	24	25	NCWTC	Pts	Ref
2010	Grimm Racing	71	Ford	DAY	ATL	MAR	NSH	KAN	DOV	CLT	TEX	MCH	IOW	GTY	IRP	POC	NSH	DAR	BRI	CHI	KEN	NHA; 30	LVS	MAR	TAL	TEX	PHO	HOM	110th	73	

==== K&N Pro Series East ====
NASCAR K&N Pro Series East results
Year	Team	No.	Make	1	2	3	4	5	6	7	8	9	10	11	12	13	14	15	16	17	18	19	20	NKNPSEC	Pts	Ref
2001	HRM Motorsports	17	Chevy	LEE; 8	NHA; 36	SEE; 18	HOL; 20	BEE; 26	EPP; 18	STA; 16	WFD; 18	BEE; 13	TMP; 28	NHA; 32	STA; 13	SEE; 13	GLN; 31	NZH; 24	THU; 17	BEE; 23	DOV; 12	STA; 29	LRP; 31	19th	1985	
2002	HRM Motorsports	17	Chevy	LEE; 25	NHA; 13	NZH; 31	SEE; 6	BEE; 5	STA; 12	HOL; 23	WFD; 11	TMP; 19	NHA; 23	STA; 10	GLN; 22	ADI; 21	THU; 15	BEE; 1	NHA; 25	DOV; 13	STA; 20	LRP; 21		15th	2182	
2003	HRM Motorsports	17	Chevy	LEE; 11	STA; 8	ERI; 8	BEE; 2*		HOL; 9		NHA; 29	WFD; 16	SEE; 7		ADI; 10	BEE; 3	THU; 5	NHA; 27	STA; 10	LRP; 7				8th	2297	
2003	HRM Motorsports	17	Ford					STA; 16		TMP; 12				GLN; 3										8th	2297	
2004	HRM Motorsports	17	Ford	LEE; 3	TMP; 7	LRP; 24	SEE; 10	STA; 11	HOL; 21	ERI; 17	WFD; 16	NHA; 7	ADI; 20	GLN; 13	NHA; 19	DOV; 3								11th	1637	
2005	Jerry Morello	77	Chevy	STA; 8	HOL; 7	ERI; 15	NHA; 8	WFD; 20	ADI; 22	STA; 8	DUB; 6	OXF; 21	NHA; 27	DOV; 26	LRP; 6	TMP; 1*								9th	1647	
2006	Roland LaChance	48	Chevy	GRE; 19	STA; 13	HOL; 5	TMP; 20	ERI; 8	NHA; 40	ADI	WFD	NHA; 23	DOV; 11	LRP										21st	854	
2007	Roland LaChance	48	Chevy	GRE	ELK	IOW	SBO	STA; 1*	NHA; 41				LRP; 13		NHA; 10	DOV; 18								21st	988	
2007	Grimm Racing	71	Chevy							TMP; 16	NSH	ADI; 5		MFD; 14										21st	988	
2008	Grimm Racing	71	Chevy	GRE; 4		SBO; 4		NHA; 1	TMP; 15	NSH; 24	ADI; 3	LRP; 14	MFD; 21	NHA; 1*	DOV; 20	STA; 5								7th	1733	
2008	Grimm Racing	75	Chevy		IOW; 20																			7th	1733	
2008	Grimm Racing	71	Ford				GLN; 27																	7th	1733	
2009	Grimm Racing	71	Chevy	GRE; 3	TRI; 12	IOW; 8	SBO; 9	GLN; 7	NHA; 6*	TMP; 4	**ADI**; 10*	LRP; 2	**NHA**; 1	DOV; 9										2nd	1685	
2010	Grimm Racing	71	Chevy	GRE; 16	SBO; 7	IOW; 6	MAR; 27	NHA; 10	LRP; 7	LEE; 4*	JFC; 16	NHA; 6	DOV; 4											5th	1368	
2011	Grimm Racing	71	Chevy	GRE; 14	SBO; 19			BGS; 13	JFC; 6	LGY; 13	NHA; 9	COL; 10	GRE; 9	NHA; 5										7th	1636	
2011	Grimm Racing	71	Toyota			RCH; 14									DOV; 4									7th	1636	
2011	Grimm Racing	7	Chevy				IOW; 3																	7th	1636	
2012	Grimm Racing	71	Toyota	BRI; 28																				6th	477	
2012	Grimm Racing	71	Chevy		GRE; 5	RCH; 8		BGS; 10	JFC; 8	LGY; 9	CNB; 6	COL; 10	IOW; 8	NHA; 8	DOV; 11	GRE; 10	CAR; 10							6th	477	
2012	Grimm Racing	7	Chevy				IOW; 8																	6th	477	
2013	Grimm Racing	71	Toyota		GRE; 8	FIF; 15		BGS; 12	IOW; 12	LGY; 9	COL; 6	IOW; 2	VIR; 9	GRE; 4	NHA; 23		RAL; 18							5th	473	
2013	Grimm Racing	71	Chevy	BRI; 7			RCH; 4									DOV; 15								5th	473	
2014	Grimm Racing	71	Chevy	NSM; 17	DAY; 19	BRI; 1	GRE; 10	RCH; 27	IOW; 21	BGS	FIF	LGY; 8	NHA; 2	COL	IOW; 6	GLN	VIR	GRE	DOV; 4					19th	329	
2015	Grimm Racing	71	Chevy	NSM	GRE	BRI; 6	IOW; 12	BGS	LGY	COL	NHA; 9	IOW	GLN	MOT	VIR	RCH; 19	DOV; 2							22nd	172	
2016	Grimm Racing	71	Chevy	NSM	MOB	GRE	BRI; 8	VIR	DOM	STA; 13	COL	NHA; 26	IOW	GLN	GRE	NJM	DOV; 12							26th	117	
2017	Grimm Racing	71	Chevy	NSM	GRE	BRI; 10	SBO	SBO	MEM	BLN	TMP; 13	NHA; 12	IOW	GLN	LGY	NJM	DOV; 2							16th	139	
2018	Calabrese Motorsports	43	Toyota	NSM	BRI; 9	LGY	SBO	SBO	MEM	NJM	TMP	NHA	IOW	GLN	GTW	NHA	DOV							45th	35	

==== K&N Pro Series West ====
NASCAR K&N Pro Series West results
Year	Team	No.	Make	1	2	3	4	5	6	7	8	9	10	11	12	NKNPSWC	Pts	Ref
2010	Grimm Racing	71	Chevy	AAS	PHO	IOW	DCS	SON	IRW	PIR	MRP	CNS	MMP	AAS	PHO; 23	72nd	94	

==== Whelen Modified Tour ====
NASCAR Whelen Modified Tour results
Year	Car owner	No.	Make	1	2	3	4	5	6	7	8	9	10	11	12	13	14	15	16	17	18	NWMTC	Pts	Ref
2005	Info not available	80	Chevy	TMP	STA	RIV	WFD	STA	JEN	NHA	BEE	SEE	RIV	STA	TMP	WFD	MAR	TMP	NHA; 37	STA	TMP	84th		
2009	Steve Seuss	70	Chevy	TMP	STA	STA	NHA	SPE	RIV	STA	BRI	TMP	NHA; 39	MAR	STA	TMP						61st	46	

=== ASA STARS National Tour ===
(key) (Bold – Pole position awarded by qualifying time. Italics – Pole position earned by points standings or practice time. * – Most laps led. ** – All laps led.)

ASA STARS National Tour results
Year	Team	No.	Make	1	2	3	4	5	6	7	8	9	10	ASNTC	Pts	Ref
2024	David Lemieux	17	Chevy	NSM	FIF	HCY	MAD	MLW; 6	AND	OWO	TOL	WIN	NSV	51st	53	
