= 2016 New Hampshire 301 =

Race details
- Race 19 of 36 in the 2016 NASCAR Sprint Cup Series
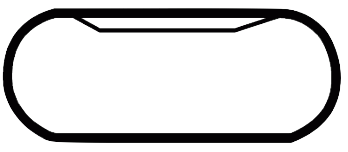
- Map of New Hampshire Motor Speedway
- Date: July 17, 2016
- Location: New Hampshire Motor Speedway in Loudon, New Hampshire
- Course: Permanent racing facility
- Course length: 1.058 miles (1.703 km)
- Distance: 301 laps, 318.458 mi (512.603 km)
- Average speed: 108.416 mph (174.479 km/h)

Pole position
Driver	Jimmie Johnson	Hendrick Motorsports
- Time: 28.430 seconds

Most laps led
Driver	Kyle Busch	Joe Gibbs Racing
- Laps: 133

Winner
No. 20	Matt Kenseth	Joe Gibbs Racing

Television in the United States
- Network: NBCSN
- Announcers: Rick Allen, Jeff Burton and Steve Letarte
- Nielsen ratings: 2.0/4 (Overnight); 2.1/4 (Final); 3.3 million viewers

Radio in the United States
- Radio: PRN
- Booth announcers: Doug Rice, Mark Garrow and Wendy Venturini
- Turn announcers: Rob Albright (1 & 2) and Pat Patterson (3 & 4)

The 2016 New Hampshire 301 was a NASCAR Sprint Cup Series stock car race held on July 17, 2016 at New Hampshire Motor Speedway in Loudon, New Hampshire. Contested over 301 laps on the 1.058-mile (1.703 km) speedway, it was the 19th race of the 2016 NASCAR Sprint Cup Series. Matt Kenseth won the race, his second win of the season, and Tony Stewart finished second. Joey Logano, Kevin Harvick and Greg Biffle rounded out the top five. The race had 13 lead changes among 8 drivers and seven cautions for 36 laps.

== Report ==
=== Entry list ===
The preliminary entry list for the race included 40 cars and was released on July 11, 2016 at 10:12 a.m. Eastern time. Among the changes is Alex Bowman subbing for Dale Earnhardt Jr. who'll sit out this race due to concussion symptoms.

No.	Driver	Team	Manufacturer
1	Jamie McMurray	Chip Ganassi Racing	Chevrolet
2	Brad Keselowski	Team Penske	Ford
3	Austin Dillon	Richard Childress Racing	Chevrolet
4	Kevin Harvick	Stewart–Haas Racing	Chevrolet
5	Kasey Kahne	Hendrick Motorsports	Chevrolet
6	Trevor Bayne	Roush Fenway Racing	Ford
7	Regan Smith	Tommy Baldwin Racing	Chevrolet
10	Danica Patrick	Stewart–Haas Racing	Chevrolet
11	Denny Hamlin	Joe Gibbs Racing	Toyota
13	Casey Mears	Germain Racing	Chevrolet
14	Tony Stewart	Stewart–Haas Racing	Chevrolet
15	Clint Bowyer	HScott Motorsports	Chevrolet
16	Greg Biffle	Roush Fenway Racing	Ford
17	Ricky Stenhouse Jr.	Roush Fenway Racing	Ford
18	Kyle Busch	Joe Gibbs Racing	Toyota
19	Carl Edwards	Joe Gibbs Racing	Toyota
20	Matt Kenseth	Joe Gibbs Racing	Toyota
21	Ryan Blaney (R)	Wood Brothers Racing	Ford
22	Joey Logano	Team Penske	Ford
23	David Ragan	BK Racing	Toyota
24	Chase Elliott (R)	Hendrick Motorsports	Chevrolet
27	Paul Menard	Richard Childress Racing	Chevrolet
30	Josh Wise	The Motorsports Group	Chevrolet
31	Ryan Newman	Richard Childress Racing	Chevrolet
32	Eddie MacDonald	Go FAS Racing	Ford
34	Chris Buescher (R)	Front Row Motorsports	Ford
38	Landon Cassill	Front Row Motorsports	Ford
41	Kurt Busch	Stewart–Haas Racing	Chevrolet
42	Kyle Larson	Chip Ganassi Racing	Chevrolet
43	Aric Almirola	Richard Petty Motorsports	Ford
44	Brian Scott (R)	Richard Petty Motorsports	Ford
46	Michael Annett	HScott Motorsports	Chevrolet
47	A. J. Allmendinger	JTG Daugherty Racing	Chevrolet
48	Jimmie Johnson	Hendrick Motorsports	Chevrolet
55	Reed Sorenson	Premium Motorsports	Chevrolet
78	Martin Truex Jr.	Furniture Row Racing	Toyota
83	Matt DiBenedetto	BK Racing	Toyota
88	Alex Bowman (i)	Hendrick Motorsports	Chevrolet
95	Ty Dillon	Circle Sport – Leavine Family Racing	Chevrolet
98	Cole Whitt	Premium Motorsports	Chevrolet
Official initial entry list
Official final entry list

== Practice ==
=== First practice ===
Martin Truex Jr. was the fastest in the first practice session with a time of 28.517 and a speed of 133.562 mph (214.947 km/h).

Pos	No.	Driver	Team	Manufacturer	Time	Speed
1	78	Martin Truex Jr.	Furniture Row Racing	Toyota	28.517	133.562
2	19	Carl Edwards	Joe Gibbs Racing	Toyota	28.556	133.380
3	18	Kyle Busch	Joe Gibbs Racing	Toyota	28.616	133.100
Official first practice results

=== Second practice ===
Carl Edwards was the fastest in the second practice session with a time of 28.974 and a speed of 131.456 mph (211.558 km/h).

Pos	No.	Driver	Team	Manufacturer	Time	Speed
1	19	Carl Edwards	Joe Gibbs Racing	Toyota	28.974	131.456
2	11	Denny Hamlin	Joe Gibbs Racing	Toyota	29.012	131.284
3	20	Matt Kenseth	Joe Gibbs Racing	Toyota	29.032	131.193
Official second practice results

=== Final practice ===
Chase Elliott was the fastest in the final practice session with a time of 28.998 and a speed of 131.347 mph (211.383 km/h).

Pos	No.	Driver	Team	Manufacturer	Time	Speed
1	24	Chase Elliott (R)	Hendrick Motorsports	Chevrolet	28.998	131.347
2	11	Denny Hamlin	Joe Gibbs Racing	Toyota	29.008	131.302
3	20	Matt Kenseth	Joe Gibbs Racing	Toyota	29.065	131.044
Official final practice results

== Qualifying ==
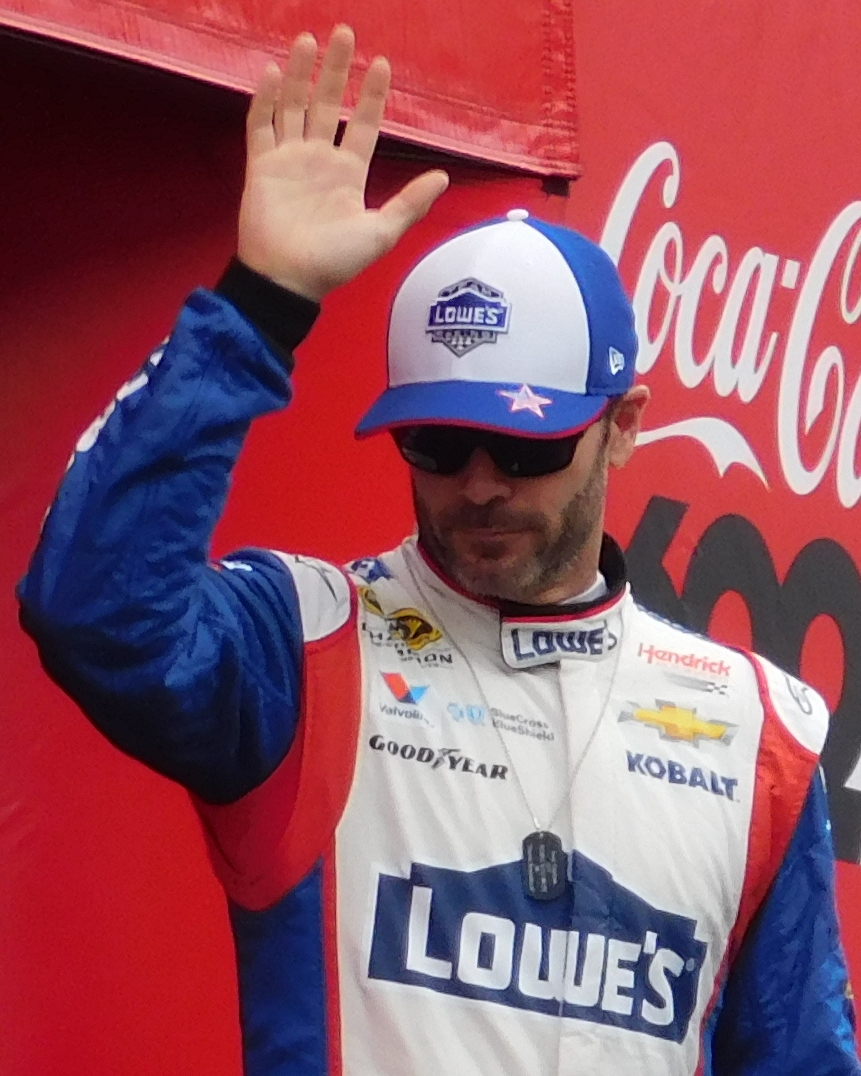
Jimmie Johnson scored the pole position.

Jimmie Johnson scored the pole for the race with a time of 28.430 and a speed of 133.971 mph (215.605 km/h). He said afterwards that his car "had a really weird set of tires or something odd go on on our mock run at the end of practice," Johnson said. "It felt like something was broken on the car. So to come back and have good speed in the car and advance, I knew after round two we would have a shot at the pole, because we were able to keep our lap count down and advance to the next round on our first lap in each session. And then put together a smooth lap. I felt like it could have been faster, but certainly a good smooth one, and it was enough." He commented further that he has "had, as everybody knows, a tough month or two. To be back in the media center is a nice feeling. I even forgot that I had to come here. It’s amazing how fast things change." He also added that qualifying at New Hampshire is important because it's "the most important track for track position. It’s a short race, very difficult to pass. You need track position. The key is to keep it, but at least we’re starting with it.”

Kyle Busch, who qualified second, said his "car wasn’t quite as good as I had hoped it would be as far as the feeling that I had with grip. It was fast though, the second round and third round were certainly high up there on the speed charts, but just didn’t quite have the comfort that I was looking for out of the car to be able to push it a little bit more and get some more time out of it, actually had to give up a little time because of the lack of grip that I felt off the exit of four and ended up p2 today.”

=== Qualifying results ===
Pos	No.	Driver	Team	Manufacturer	R1	R2	R3
1	48	Jimmie Johnson	Hendrick Motorsports	Chevrolet	28.884	28.630	28.430
2	18	Kyle Busch	Joe Gibbs Racing	Toyota	28.779	28.407	28.460
3	78	Martin Truex Jr.	Furniture Row Racing	Toyota	28.701	28.675	28.558
4	41	Kurt Busch	Stewart–Haas Racing	Chevrolet	28.674	28.668	28.625
5	11	Denny Hamlin	Joe Gibbs Racing	Toyota	28.626	28.564	28.625
6	22	Joey Logano	Team Penske	Ford	28.602	28.632	28.656
7	24	Chase Elliott (R)	Hendrick Motorsports	Chevrolet	28.740	28.615	28.698
8	4	Kevin Harvick	Stewart–Haas Racing	Chevrolet	28.682	28.658	28.703
9	2	Brad Keselowski	Team Penske	Ford	28.925	28.638	28.704
10	47	A. J. Allmendinger	JTG Daugherty Racing	Chevrolet	28.924	28.672	28.720
11	5	Kasey Kahne	Hendrick Motorsports	Chevrolet	28.883	28.619	28.827
12	14	Tony Stewart	Stewart–Haas Racing	Chevrolet	28.901	28.636	28.857
13	19	Carl Edwards	Joe Gibbs Racing	Toyota	28.761	28.676	
14	21	Ryan Blaney (R)	Wood Brothers Racing	Ford	28.901	28.681	
15	3	Austin Dillon	Richard Childress Racing	Chevrolet	28.728	28.685	
16	83	Matt DiBenedetto	BK Racing	Toyota	28.908	28.706	
17	42	Kyle Larson	Chip Ganassi Racing	Chevrolet	28.819	28.752	
18	20	Matt Kenseth	Joe Gibbs Racing	Toyota	28.675	28.794	
19	1	Jamie McMurray	Chip Ganassi Racing	Chevrolet	28.925	28.802	
20	88	Alex Bowman (i)	Hendrick Motorsports	Chevrolet	28.838	28.842	
21	13	Casey Mears	Germain Racing	Chevrolet	28.800	28.915	
22	17	Ricky Stenhouse Jr.	Roush Fenway Racing	Ford	28.949	28.925	
23	23	David Ragan	BK Racing	Toyota	28.919	28.928	
24	27	Paul Menard	Richard Childress Racing	Chevrolet	28.947	29.035	
25	31	Ryan Newman	Richard Childress Racing	Chevrolet	28.964		
26	43	Aric Almirola	Richard Petty Motorsports	Ford	28.986		
27	95	Michael McDowell	Circle Sport – Leavine Family Racing	Chevrolet	29.085		
28	16	Greg Biffle	Roush Fenway Racing	Ford	29.139		
29	10	Danica Patrick	Stewart–Haas Racing	Chevrolet	29.171		
30	38	Landon Cassill	Front Row Motorsports	Ford	29.171		
31	6	Trevor Bayne	Roush Fenway Racing	Ford	29.173		
32	15	Clint Bowyer	HScott Motorsports	Chevrolet	29.216		
33	44	Brian Scott (R)	Richard Petty Motorsports	Ford	29.248		
34	7	Regan Smith	Tommy Baldwin Racing	Chevrolet	29.341		
35	34	Chris Buescher (R)	Front Row Motorsports	Ford	29.599		
36	55	Reed Sorenson	Premium Motorsports	Chevrolet	29.740		
37	46	Michael Annett	HScott Motorsports	Chevrolet	30.044		
38	32	Eddie MacDonald	Go FAS Racing	Ford	30.064		
39	30	Josh Wise	The Motorsports Group	Chevrolet	30.101		
40	98	Ryan Ellis (i)	Premium Motorsports	Chevrolet	30.502		
Official qualifying results

== Race ==
=== First half ===
Under mostly sunny New Hampshire skies, Jimmie Johnson led the field to the green flag at 1:41 p.m. Kyle Busch and Kurt Busch tried to pass Johnson exiting turn 4, but Johnson edged ahead and led the first lap. Kyle got right beside him exiting turn 4 and edged him to the line to lead the second lap. By lap 30, he held a three-second lead over Johnson. By lap 35, Johnson fell from second to fourth. The first caution of the race flew on lap 36. It was a scheduled competition caution for overnight rain.

The race restarted on lap 41. After 20 laps, his lead was half a second over Martin Truex Jr. By lap 80, the gap shrunk to four-tenths of a second. By lap 81, Truex closed up to his rear bumper. After working on Kyle for seven laps, Truex took the lead on lap 89. After 10 laps, Kyle fell from second to fifth. The second caution of the race flew on lap 100 for a single-car spin on the backstretch. Exiting turn 2, Chris Buescher got loose, slammed on the brakes to avoid slamming Josh Wise – but hit him anyway – and spun down the track. Wise went on to finish 40th.

The race restarted on lap 109. By lap 120, his lead grew to three seconds over Kurt Busch. By lap 140, the lead shrunk to 1.3 seconds. By lap 173, Kyle reeled in Truex and passed him in turn 1 to retake the lead. Truex didn't give up and stayed close to Kyle to try and pounce on him for the lead. A number of cars began making green flag stops on lap 181. Kyle hit pit road on lap 183 and handed the lead to Brad Keselowski. He pitted the next lap and the lead cycled back to Kyle. Ryan Blaney was tagged for speeding on pit road and was forced to serve a pass through penalty.

=== Second half ===
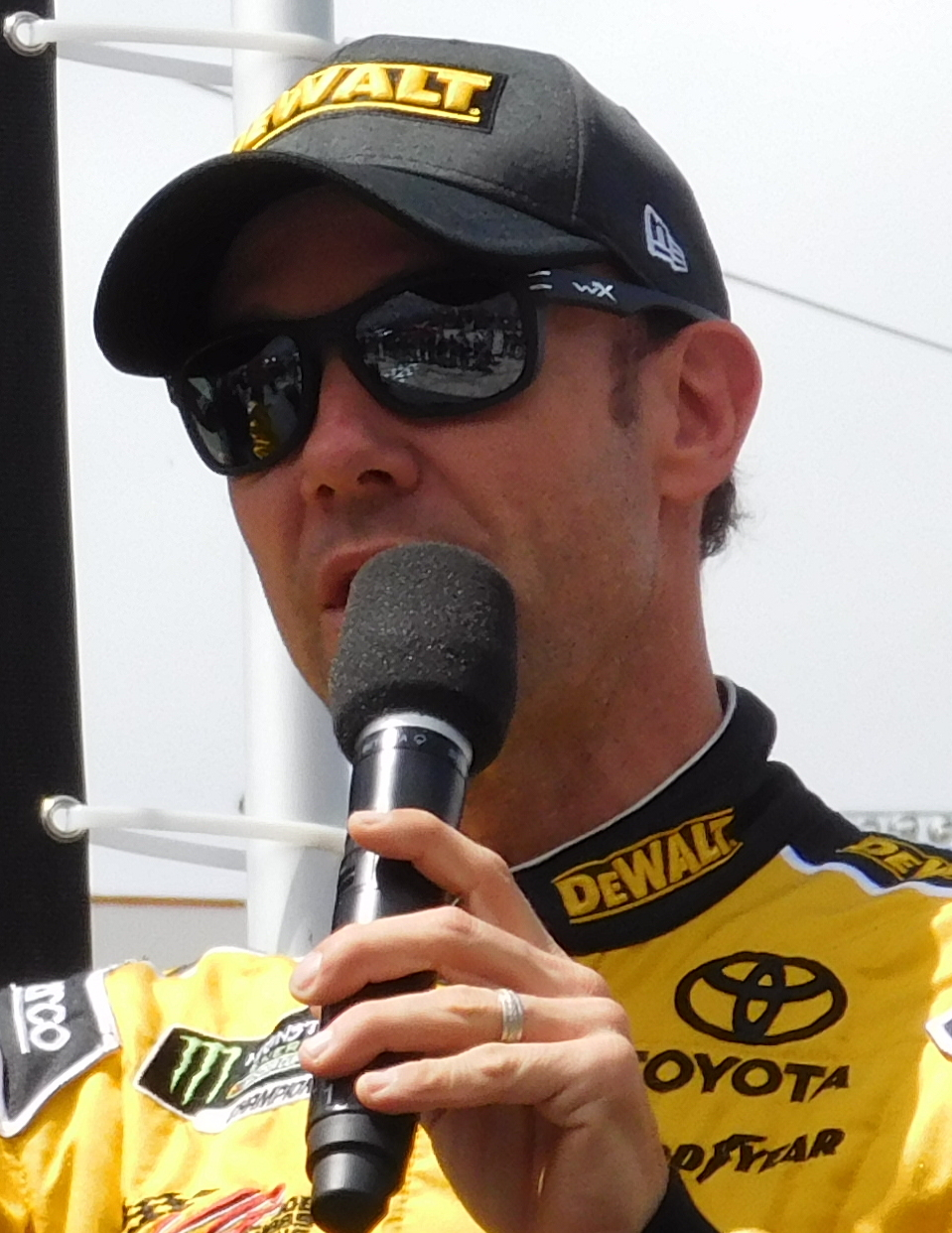
Matt Kenseth won the race, but failed post-race inspection.

Debris in turn 3 brought out the third caution of the race with 80 laps to go. Truex exited pit road with the race lead. A. J. Allmendinger was tagged for his crew being over the wall too soon and restarted the race from the tail-end of the field.

The race restarted with 74 laps to go. He was unable to pull away from the field as Matt Kenseth pulled up to him looking for the lead. He spent the next 30 laps tailing Truex until he got to his inside exiting turn 4 and took the lead with 44 laps to go. Debris in turn 3 brought out the fourth caution of the race with 36 laps to go. Denny Hamlin opted not to pit under the caution and assumed the lead. During the caution, Truex reported that his shifter had broken and that he had no clutch.

The race restarted with 33 laps to go. Truex's car, being stuck in fourth gear, stalled on the restart and caused a log jam with cars swerving to avoid him, which led to a number of cars making contact with one another. Kenseth worked on Hamlin for a number of laps before retaking the lead with 30 laps to go. The fifth caution of the race flew with 29 laps to go for a two-car wreck on the frontstretch. Entering turn 1, Alex Bowman – subbing for the injured Dale Earnhardt Jr. – suffered a tire blowout and slammed the wall. Chase Elliott also suffered a tire blowout, but avoided the wall. Bowman said after the race that he thought Edwards "was backing up because he was blocked in as I was leaving the pit box. My left-rear hit his right-rear as I was leaving. It caved it in enough, we thought we would be fine, but obviously, when I got into (Kurt Busch) it was already going down. They knew we were here for sure and I had a blast.” He added that what happened was "really unfortunate — the worst we would have finished was about seventh or eighth. I hate the circumstances obviously, and I hope Dale Jr. is feeling better, but we had a top-10 car all day long.”

The race restarted with 24 laps to go and a number of cars made contact on the restart, notably the No. 41 of Kurt Busch. Three laps later, he suffered a left-rear tire blowout and hit the wall. Brad Keselowski also suffered a tire blowout.

The race restarted with 17 laps to go. A three-car wreck on the backstretch brought out the sixth caution of the race. It started with Ryan Newman made contact with Carl Edwards. He turned down into Kasey Kahne who turned up into Kyle Larson who turned down through the grass.

The race restarted with 11 laps to go and Kenseth drove on to score the victory.

== Post-race ==
=== Driver comments ===
Kenseth expressed satisfaction with his victory and credited crew chief Jason Ratcliff and the team for their adjustments to the car during the race.[1]

After a runner-up finish, Stewart said his crew chief "is doing a great job on the box. You can see the confidence not only in him, but all the guys on the team. Our Chevys are fast right now. I feel like we are gaining on it. What we said, I don't know when we said it, we were talking about you crawl before you walk, walk before you run, run before you jog and job before you sprint. We are definitely running right now. I feel like we are getting pretty close to this sprint at the end."

After edging out Harvick at the line for third, Logano said he would "take a third place after all that. We were awful at the beginning of the race. We tried some new things and apparently they didn’t work so we aborted mission in the middle of the race and got some speed back in the 22 but not enough to beat the 20.”

"We under-execute as a team on a weekly basis and got to do a better job," an unhappy Harvick said after finishing fourth. "The ... cars are always fast, but we always do something wrong. It's really going to have to come from the top [to manage]. I mean they are going to have to clamp down and there is no way we can win a championship like this unless they straighten some of this stuff out."

=== Penalties ===
Kenseth was issued a penalty on the Wednesday following the race for failing post-race inspection. He was docked 15 driver points, crew chief Jason Ratcliff was issued a 25-thousand dollar fine and placed on probation through December 31.

== Race results ==
Pos	No.	Driver	Team	Manufacturer	Laps	Points
1	20	Matt Kenseth	Joe Gibbs Racing	Toyota	301	29
2	14	Tony Stewart	Stewart–Haas Racing	Chevrolet	301	39
3	22	Joey Logano	Team Penske	Ford	301	38
4	4	Kevin Harvick	Stewart–Haas Racing	Chevrolet	301	37
5	16	Greg Biffle	Roush Fenway Racing	Ford	301	36
6	1	Jamie McMurray	Chip Ganassi Racing	Chevrolet	301	35
7	31	Ryan Newman	Richard Childress Racing	Chevrolet	301	34
8	18	Kyle Busch	Joe Gibbs Racing	Toyota	301	35
9	11	Denny Hamlin	Joe Gibbs Racing	Toyota	301	33
10	17	Ricky Stenhouse Jr.	Roush Fenway Racing	Ford	301	31
11	21	Ryan Blaney (R)	Wood Brothers Racing	Ford	301	30
12	48	Jimmie Johnson	Hendrick Motorsports	Chevrolet	301	30
13	3	Austin Dillon	Richard Childress Racing	Chevrolet	301	28
14	10	Danica Patrick	Stewart–Haas Racing	Chevrolet	301	27
15	2	Brad Keselowski	Team Penske	Ford	301	27
16	78	Martin Truex Jr.	Furniture Row Racing	Toyota	301	26
17	42	Kyle Larson	Chip Ganassi Racing	Chevrolet	301	24
18	27	Paul Menard	Richard Childress Racing	Chevrolet	301	23
19	43	Aric Almirola	Richard Petty Motorsports	Ford	301	22
20	19	Carl Edwards	Joe Gibbs Racing	Toyota	301	21
21	47	A. J. Allmendinger	JTG Daugherty Racing	Chevrolet	301	20
22	41	Kurt Busch	Stewart–Haas Racing	Chevrolet	301	19
23	6	Trevor Bayne	Roush Fenway Racing	Ford	301	18
24	15	Clint Bowyer	HScott Motorsports	Chevrolet	301	17
25	5	Kasey Kahne	Hendrick Motorsports	Chevrolet	301	16
26	88	Alex Bowman (i)	Hendrick Motorsports	Chevrolet	301	0
27	13	Casey Mears	Germain Racing	Chevrolet	300	14
28	38	Landon Cassill	Front Row Motorsports	Ford	299	13
29	34	Chris Buescher (R)	Front Row Motorsports	Ford	299	12
30	23	David Ragan	BK Racing	Toyota	299	11
31	83	Matt DiBenedetto	BK Racing	Toyota	299	10
32	7	Regan Smith	Tommy Baldwin Racing	Chevrolet	297	9
33	46	Michael Annett	HScott Motorsports	Chevrolet	295	8
34	24	Chase Elliott (R)	Hendrick Motorsports	Chevrolet	294	7
35	55	Reed Sorenson	Premium Motorsports	Chevrolet	294	6
36	32	Eddie MacDonald	Go FAS Racing	Ford	293	5
37	98	Ryan Ellis (i)	Premium Motorsports	Chevrolet	292	0
38	44	Brian Scott (R)	Richard Petty Motorsports	Ford	278	3
39	95	Michael McDowell	Circle Sport – Leavine Family Racing	Chevrolet	191	2
40	30	Josh Wise	The Motorsports Group	Chevrolet	94	1
Official race results

=== Race summary ===
- 13 lead changes among 8 drivers
- 7 cautions for 36 laps
- 0 red flags
- Time of race: 2 hours, 57 minutes and 53 seconds
- Average speed: 107.416 miles per hour (172.869 km/h)

== Media ==
=== Television ===
NBC Sports covered the race on the television side. Rick Allen, four-time and all-time Loudon winner Jeff Burton and Steve Letarte had the call in the booth for the race. Dave Burns, Mike Massaro, Marty Snider and Kelli Stavast reported from pit lane during the race.

NBCSN
Booth announcers	Pit reporters
Lap-by-lap: Rick Allen; Color-commentator: Jeff Burton; Color-commentator: Steve Letarte	Dave Burns; Mike Massaro; Marty Snider; Kelli Stavast

=== Radio ===
PRN had the radio call for the race, which was simulcast on Sirius XM NASCAR Radio.

PRN
Booth announcers	Turn announcers	Pit reporters
Lead announcer: Doug Rice; Announcer: Mark Garrow; Announcer: Wendy Venturini	Turns 1 & 2: Rob Albright; Turns 3 & 4: Pat Patterson	Brad Gillie; Brett McMillan; Jim Noble; Steve Richards

== Standings after the race ==
Drivers' Championship standings
	Pos	Manufacturer	Points
	1	Kevin Harvick	636
	2	Brad Keselowski	622 (–14)
	3	Kurt Busch	602 (–34)
	4	Carl Edwards	587 (–49)
	5	Joey Logano	571 (–65)
	6	Kyle Busch	556 (–80)
	7	Martin Truex Jr.	540 (–96)
1	8	Jimmie Johnson	514 (–122)
1	9	Matt Kenseth	506 (–132)*
1	10	Denny Hamlin	505 (–131)
3	11	Chase Elliott (R)	499 (–137)
	12	Ryan Newman	497 (–139)
1	13	Austin Dillon	488 (–148)
1	14	Jamie McMurray	474 (–162)
2	15	Dale Earnhardt Jr.	461 (–175)
	16	Trevor Bayne	447 (–189)
Official driver's standings

Manufacturers' Championship standings
Pos	Manufacturer	Points
1	Toyota	787
2	Chevrolet	762 (–25)
3	Ford	724 (–63)
Official manufacturer's standings

- Note: Only the first 16 positions are included for the driver standings.
  . – Driver has clinched a position in the Chase for the Sprint Cup.

Previous race: 2016 Quaker State 400	Sprint Cup Series; 2016 season	Next race: 2016 Brickyard 400
