= 2015 5-hour Energy 301 =

Race details
- Race 19 of 36 in the 2015 NASCAR Sprint Cup Series
- The 2015 5-hour Energy 301 program cover, celebrating New Hampshire Motor Speedway's 25th anniversary.
- Date: July 19, 2015
- Location: New Hampshire Motor Speedway in Loudon, New Hampshire
- Course: Permanent racing facility
- Course length: 1.058 miles (1.703 km)
- Distance: 301 laps, 318.458 mi (512.603 km)
- Weather: Mostly sunny skies with a temperature of 87 °F (31 °C); wind out of the south/southwest at 8 mph (13 km/h).
- Average speed: 108.504 mph (174.620 km/h)

Pole position
Driver	Carl Edwards	Joe Gibbs Racing
- Time: 28.179

Most laps led
Driver	Brad Keselowski	Team Penske
- Laps: 100

Winner
No. 18	Kyle Busch	Joe Gibbs Racing

Television in the United States
- Network: NBCSN
- Announcers: Rick Allen, Jeff Burton and Steve Letarte
- Nielsen ratings: 2.3/5 (Overnight); 2.4/5 (Final); 3.7 Million viewers

Radio in the United States
- Radio: PRN
- Booth announcers: Doug Rice, Mark Garrow and Wendy Venturini
- Turn announcers: Rob Albright (1 & 2) and Pat Patterson (3 & 4)

The 2015 5-hour Energy 301 was a NASCAR Sprint Cup Series race held on July 19, 2015 at New Hampshire Motor Speedway in Loudon, New Hampshire. Contested over 301 laps on the 1.058 mile (1.703 km) speedway, it was the 19th race of the 2015 NASCAR Sprint Cup Series season. Kyle Busch won the race, his third of the season. Brad Keselowski finished second while Kevin Harvick, Joey Logano and Dale Earnhardt Jr. rounded out the top five.

Carl Edwards won the pole for the race and led 19 laps on his way to a seventh-place finish. Brad Keselowski led a race high of 100 laps on his way to a runner-up finish. The race had nine lead changes among seven different drivers, as well as seven caution flag periods for 34 laps.

This was the 32nd career victory for Kyle Busch, his third of the 2015 season, second consecutive race win, second at New Hampshire Motor Speedway and seventh at the track for Joe Gibbs Racing. This win moved Busch up to 33rd in the points standings, 58 behind David Gilliland for the 30th place Chase cutoff and 487 behind points leader Kevin Harvick. Despite being the winning manufacturer, Toyota left Loudon trailing Chevrolet by 84 points in the manufacture standings.

An advertisement for the 2015 5-hour Energy 301.

The 5-hour Energy 301 was carried by NBC Sports on the cable/satellite NBCSN network for the American television audience. The radio broadcast for the race was carried by the Performance Racing Network on Sirius XM NASCAR Radio.

== Report ==
=== Background ===
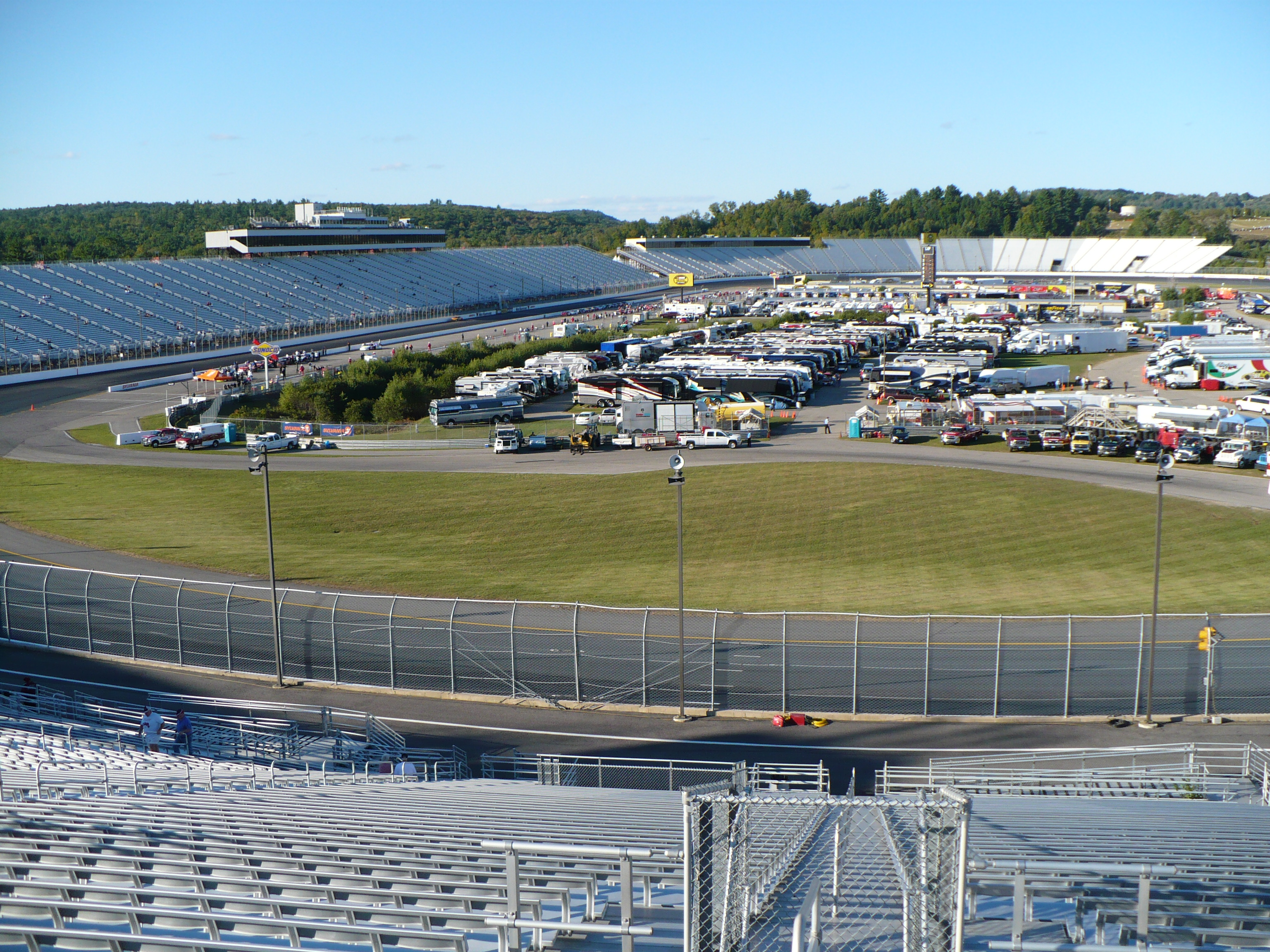
New Hampshire Motor Speedway, the track where the race was held.

New Hampshire Motor Speedway is a 1.058-mile (1.703 km) oval speedway located in Loudon, New Hampshire.

Kevin Harvick entered New Hampshire with a 68-point lead over Jimmie Johnson and Joey Logano. Dale Earnhardt Jr. entered 76 back and Martin Truex Jr. entered 96 back.

==== Entry list ====
The entry list for the 5-hour Energy 301 was released on Monday, July 13 at 11:42 a.m. Eastern time. Forty-four cars were entered for the race. All 44 were entered for the previous week's Quaker State 400. The driver changes for this week's race included Eddie MacDonald in the No. 32 Go FAS Racing Ford, Derek White attempted to make his first career Sprint Cup Series start in the No. 33 Hillman-Circle Sport LLC Chevrolet, Reed Sorenson in the No. 62 Premium Motorsports Chevrolet and Timmy Hill in the No. 98 Premium Motorsports Ford.

No.	Driver	Team	Manufacturer
1	Jamie McMurray	Chip Ganassi Racing	Chevrolet
2	Brad Keselowski (PC3)	Team Penske	Ford
3	Austin Dillon	Richard Childress Racing	Chevrolet
4	Kevin Harvick (PC1)	Stewart–Haas Racing	Chevrolet
5	Kasey Kahne	Hendrick Motorsports	Chevrolet
6	Trevor Bayne	Roush Fenway Racing	Ford
7	Alex Bowman	Tommy Baldwin Racing	Chevrolet
9	Sam Hornish Jr.	Richard Petty Motorsports	Ford
10	Danica Patrick	Stewart–Haas Racing	Chevrolet
11	Denny Hamlin	Joe Gibbs Racing	Toyota
13	Casey Mears	Germain Racing	Chevrolet
14	Tony Stewart (PC4)	Stewart–Haas Racing	Chevrolet
15	Clint Bowyer	Michael Waltrip Racing	Toyota
16	Greg Biffle	Roush Fenway Racing	Ford
17	Ricky Stenhouse Jr.	Roush Fenway Racing	Ford
18	Kyle Busch	Joe Gibbs Racing	Toyota
19	Carl Edwards	Joe Gibbs Racing	Toyota
20	Matt Kenseth (PC6)	Joe Gibbs Racing	Toyota
21	Ryan Blaney (i)	Wood Brothers Racing	Ford
22	Joey Logano	Team Penske	Ford
23	J. J. Yeley (i)	BK Racing	Toyota
24	Jeff Gordon (PC7)	Hendrick Motorsports	Chevrolet
26	Jeb Burton (R)	BK Racing	Toyota
27	Paul Menard	Richard Childress Racing	Chevrolet
31	Ryan Newman	Richard Childress Racing	Chevrolet
32	Eddie MacDonald	Go FAS Racing	Ford
33	Derek White	Hillman-Circle Sport LLC	Chevrolet
34	Brett Moffitt (R)	Front Row Motorsports	Ford
35	Cole Whitt	Front Row Motorsports	Ford
38	David Gilliland	Front Row Motorsports	Ford
40	Landon Cassill (i)	Hillman-Circle Sport LLC	Chevrolet
41	Kurt Busch (PC5)	Stewart–Haas Racing	Chevrolet
42	Kyle Larson	Chip Ganassi Racing	Chevrolet
43	Aric Almirola	Richard Petty Motorsports	Ford
46	Michael Annett	HScott Motorsports	Chevrolet
47	A. J. Allmendinger	JTG Daugherty Racing	Chevrolet
48	Jimmie Johnson (PC2)	Hendrick Motorsports	Chevrolet
51	Justin Allgaier	HScott Motorsports	Chevrolet
55	David Ragan	Michael Waltrip Racing	Toyota
62	Reed Sorenson	Premium Motorsports	Chevrolet
78	Martin Truex Jr.	Furniture Row Racing	Chevrolet
83	Matt DiBenedetto (R)	BK Racing	Toyota
88	Dale Earnhardt Jr.	Hendrick Motorsports	Chevrolet
98	Timmy Hill (i)	Premium Motorsports	Ford
Official initial entry list
Official final entry list

Key	Meaning
(R)	Rookie
(i)	Ineligible for points
(PC#)	Past champions provisional

== First practice ==
Kyle Larson was the fastest in the first practice session with a time of 28.486 and a speed of 133.708 mph (215.182 km/h).

Pos	No.	Driver	Team	Manufacturer	Time	Speed
1	42	Kyle Larson	Chip Ganassi Racing	Chevrolet	28.486	133.708
2	18	Kyle Busch	Joe Gibbs Racing	Toyota	28.495	133.666
3	1	Jamie McMurray	Chip Ganassi Racing	Chevrolet	28.537	133.469
Official first practice results

== Qualifying ==
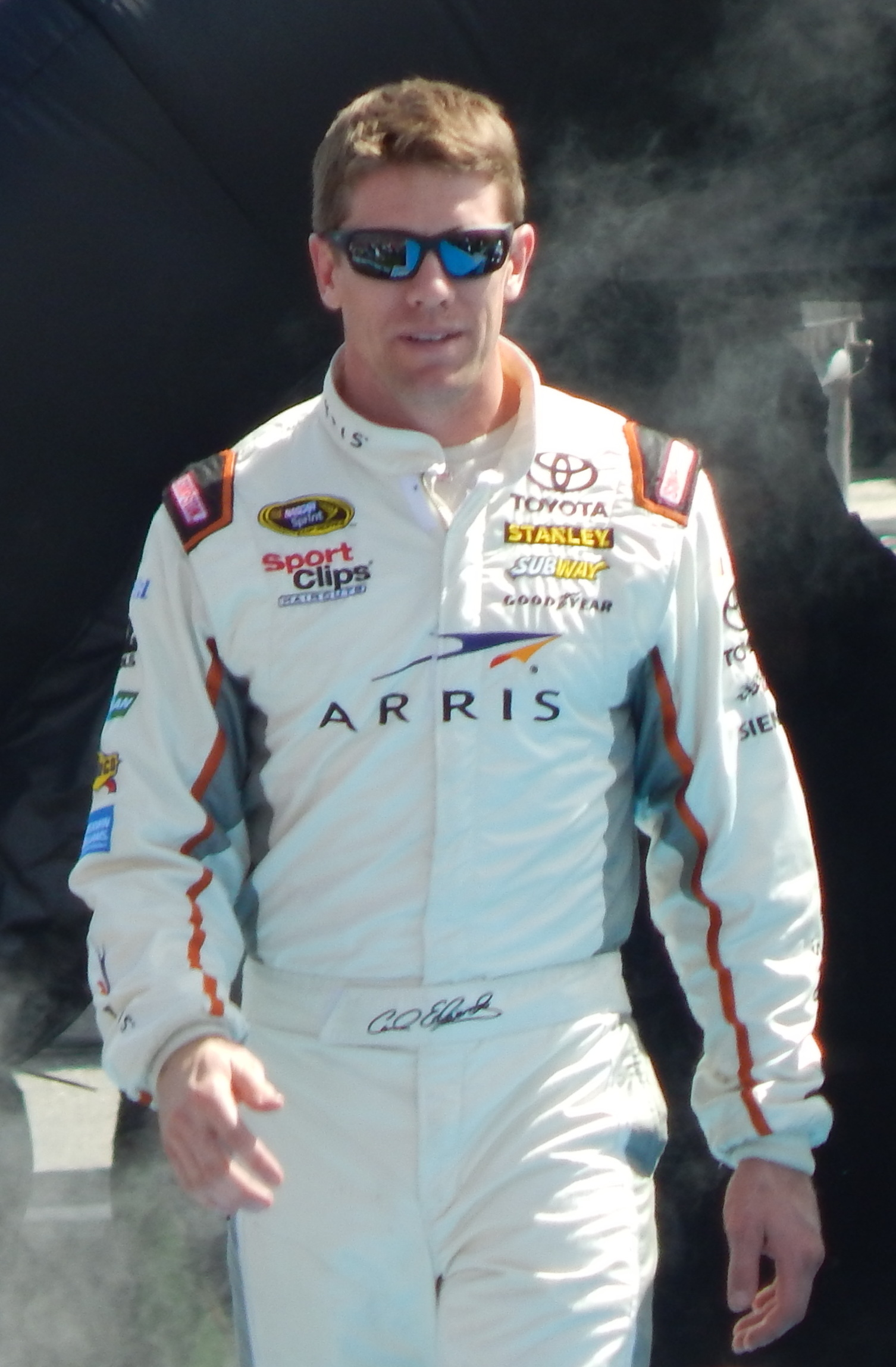
Carl Edwards, seen here at the 2015 Daytona 500, scored the pole for the race.

Carl Edwards won the pole with a time of 28.179 and a speed of 135.164 mph (217.525 km/h). "I’ve struggled at this racetrack so this is big for me," Edwards said. "We need to get another win." "We hope we’ll keep this speed on race day," said Connecticut native Joey Logano after qualifying second. "We all know how special Loudon is to me, to try to make something happen here, so it’s nice to know we’ve got a fast racecar. It’s good in race trim, as well. We weren’t very good in qualifying trim in practice. We changed a lot of things and lit it up a little bit" "It's not been a good day for us," said three-time New Hampshire winner Jeff Gordon after qualifying 23rd. "We've been struggling. It's disappointing we didn't qualify better."

=== Qualifying results ===
Pos	No.	Driver	Team	Manufacturer	R1	R2	R3
1	19	Carl Edwards	Joe Gibbs Racing	Toyota	28.581	28.266	28.179
2	22	Joey Logano	Team Penske	Ford	28.463	28.120	28.209
3	55	David Ragan	Michael Waltrip Racing	Toyota	28.413	28.255	28.209
4	18	Kyle Busch	Joe Gibbs Racing	Toyota	28.537	28.307	28.271
5	11	Denny Hamlin	Joe Gibbs Racing	Toyota	28.557	28.349	28.297
6	41	Kurt Busch	Stewart–Haas Racing	Chevrolet	28.450	28.280	28.298
7	48	Jimmie Johnson	Hendrick Motorsports	Chevrolet	28.494	28.321	28.318
8	20	Matt Kenseth	Joe Gibbs Racing	Toyota	28.493	28.316	28.333
9	5	Kasey Kahne	Hendrick Motorsports	Chevrolet	28.406	28.315	28.340
10	2	Brad Keselowski	Team Penske	Ford	28.519	28.314	28.419
11	1	Jamie McMurray	Chip Ganassi Racing	Chevrolet	28.402	28.308	28.424
12	4	Kevin Harvick	Stewart–Haas Racing	Chevrolet	28.420	28.283	28.511
13	40	Landon Cassill (i)	Hillman-Circle Sport LLC	Chevrolet	28.494	28.387	—
14	16	Greg Biffle	Roush Fenway Racing	Ford	28.591	28.408	—
15	78	Martin Truex Jr.	Furniture Row Racing	Chevrolet	28.362	28.415	—
16	21	Ryan Blaney (i)	Wood Brothers Racing	Ford	28.345	28.422	—
17	42	Kyle Larson	Chip Ganassi Racing	Chevrolet	28.577	28.466	—
18	15	Clint Bowyer	Michael Waltrip Racing	Toyota	28.421	28.469	—
19	88	Dale Earnhardt Jr.	Hendrick Motorsports	Chevrolet	28.627	28.538	—
20	10	Danica Patrick	Stewart–Haas Racing	Chevrolet	28.629	28.541	—
21	13	Casey Mears	Germain Racing	Chevrolet	28.598	28.551	—
22	47	A. J. Allmendinger	JTG Daugherty Racing	Chevrolet	28.547	28.598	—
23	24	Jeff Gordon	Hendrick Motorsports	Chevrolet	28.607	28.623	—
24	3	Austin Dillon	Richard Childress Racing	Chevrolet	28.547	28.654	—
25	14	Tony Stewart	Stewart–Haas Racing	Chevrolet	28.664	—	—
26	31	Ryan Newman	Richard Childress Racing	Chevrolet	28.699	—	—
27	9	Sam Hornish Jr.	Richard Petty Motorsports	Ford	28.719	—	—
28	27	Paul Menard	Richard Childress Racing	Chevrolet	28.722	—	—
29	43	Aric Almirola	Richard Petty Motorsports	Ford	28.739	—	—
30	51	Justin Allgaier	HScott Motorsports	Chevrolet	28.740	—	—
31	6	Trevor Bayne	Roush Fenway Racing	Ford	28.770	—	—
32	17	Ricky Stenhouse Jr.	Roush Fenway Racing	Ford	28.817	—	—
33	35	Cole Whitt	Front Row Motorsports	Chevrolet	28.832	—	—
34	34	Brett Moffitt (R)	Front Row Motorsports	Ford	28.930	—	—
35	83	Matt DiBenedetto (R)	BK Racing	Toyota	28.993	—	—
36	26	Jeb Burton (R)	BK Racing	Toyota	29.081	—	—
37	38	David Gilliland	Front Row Motorsports	Ford	29.127	—	—
38	46	Michael Annett	HScott Motorsports	Chevrolet	29.231	—	—
39	23	J. J. Yeley	BK Racing	Toyota	29.438	—	—
40	7	Alex Bowman	Tommy Baldwin Racing	Chevrolet	29.502	—	—
41	32	Eddie MacDonald	Go FAS Racing	Ford	29.527	—	—
42	33	Derek White (i)	Hillman-Circle Sport LLC	Chevrolet	30.189	—	—
43	98	Timmy Hill (i)	Premium Motorsports	Ford	37.333	—	—
Failed to qualify
44	62	Reed Sorenson	Premium Motorsports	Chevrolet	29.431	—	—
Official qualifying results

== Practice (post-qualifying) ==
=== Second practice ===
Kevin Harvick was the fastest in the second practice session with a time of 28.834 and a speed of 132.094 mph (212.585 km/h). In the closing minutes of the session, Clint Bowyer collided with Jeff Gordon just as Gordon was backing out of his garage stall. “You can’t see out of the pit stall,” Bowyer told Motorsport.com. “He just came out and I was a comin’. That poor ol’ boy that was backing him out, I bet he feels like (crap). But you know, it’s a wonder it don’t happen more often. To be honest with you, I was pulling out of my stall, I went to come back out and the guy never moved. I was like, ‘whoa, whoa, whoa.’ But it’s so tight in here. You hate to see that, but damn, especially with the 24 (laughs) and everything we have going on. It didn’t seem to hurt our car too bad. It hurt his bad — it hit in a bad spot. But that’s why we have guys that back us up.” “Hopefully all this hard work and stuff we’re going through will pay off tomorrow," said Gordon, who will start 23rd. "We’ve got a pit cart over there that kind of blocks what you can see of the back of my car backing out there. The guy that backs me out looked over, guess he was just starting to back me out; and I crept out there and he cleared me, but the No. 15 (Bowyer), probably couldn’t really see me because of that pit cart and I don’t know if he kind of glanced away or what, but when he looked back, I was just right there and couldn’t go anywhere. Its kind of a combination of, I guess, both of us could take fault in that. But our team did an amazing job of fixing quite a bit of damage (to the right rear). I love seeing my crew chief (Alan Gustafson) get in there and get dirty, but not for that reason. And, that practice went a little bit better than the other one. So, we’re gaining on it. I don’t want to say it can’t get worse, but I know it can. So, I’m not going to say that. But hopefully this will all pay off for us tomorrow.”

Pos	No.	Driver	Team	Manufacturer	Time	Speed
1	4	Kevin Harvick	Stewart–Haas Racing	Chevrolet	28.834	132.094
2	48	Jimmie Johnson	Hendrick Motorsports	Chevrolet	28.860	131.975
3	19	Carl Edwards	Joe Gibbs Racing	Toyota	28.879	131.888
Official first practice results

=== Final practice ===
Carl Edwards was the fastest in the final practice session with a time of 28.614 and a speed of 133.110 mph (214.220 km/h).

Pos	No.	Driver	Team	Manufacturer	Time	Speed
1	19	Carl Edwards	Joe Gibbs Racing	Toyota	28.614	133.110
2	4	Kevin Harvick	Stewart–Haas Racing	Chevrolet	28.768	132.397
3	21	Ryan Blaney (i)	Wood Brothers Racing	Ford	28.808	132.213
Official final practice results

== Race ==
=== First half ===
==== Start ====
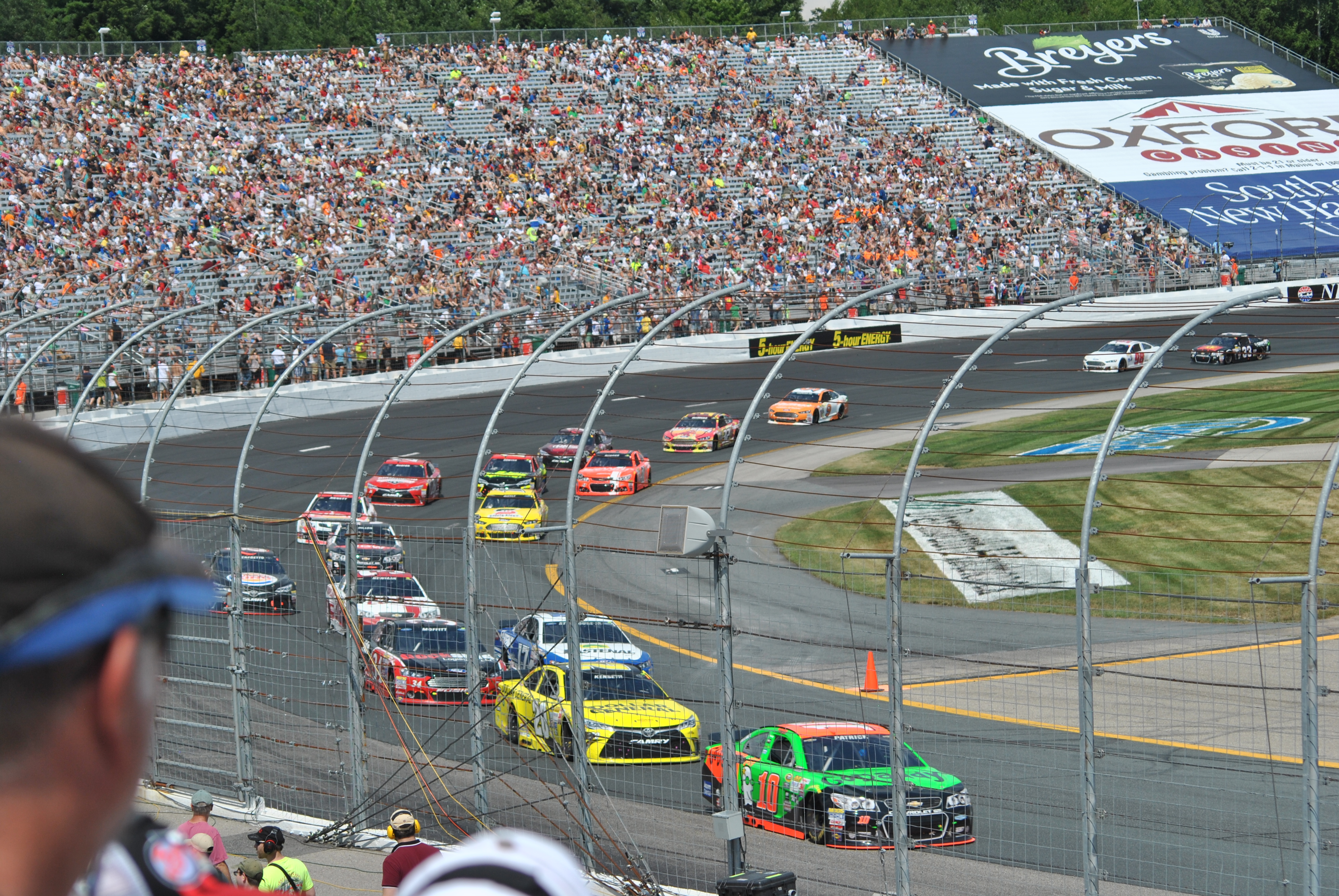
Cars racing in the 5-hour Energy 301

The race was scheduled to start at 1:45 p.m., but the threat of inclement weather prompted NASCAR to move the start up to 1:35. It started at 1:38 when Carl Edwards led the field to the green flag. By lap 20, teammate Kyle Busch ran him down, passed him going into turn 3 to take the lead. Debris in turn 1 brought out the first caution of the race on lap 22. Most of the field ninth on back opted to pit under the caution.

The race restarted on lap 27. By lap 64, Brad Keselowski ran down the leader to within half a second. He went underneath Kyle Busch going into turn 1 to take the lead on lap 68. Carl Edwards was the first of the eight drivers that didn't pit under the first caution to hit pit road at lap 77. He was followed by Jamie McMurray on lap 78 and David Ragan on lap 79. Matt Kenseth hit pit road on lap 81. Kurt Busch pitted from fourth on lap 82. Joey Logano, Denny Hamlin, Kyle Busch and Jimmie Johnson rounded out the pit cycle. Matt Kenseth was tagged for speeding on pit road and was forced to serve a drive-through penalty.

==== Second quarter ====
The cars that pitted under the first caution started pitting on lap 87. Brad Keselowski surrendered the lead to pit on lap 88 and handed the lead to Dale Earnhardt Jr. He pitted the next lap and handed the lead to teammate Jeff Gordon. He pitted on lap 91 and handed the lead to A. J. Allmendinger. Debris in turn 1 brought out the second caution of the race on lap 96. The debris was the right-front tire on the No. 7 of Alex Bowman catching fire as he was exiting his pit stall. Allmendinger, low on fuel, was forced to pit from the lead under caution and the lead cycled back to Keselowski. Justin Allgaier was tagged for removing equipment out of the pit box. Sam Hornish Jr. was tagged for too many members of his pit crew being over the wall. Kyle Larson was tagged for speeding on pit road. All restarted the race from the tail end of the field.

The race restarted on lap 108. Debris on the front stretch brought out the third caution of the race on lap 117. Carl Edwards was the only driver in the top ten that opted to pit under the caution.

=== Second half ===
==== Halfway ====
The race restarted on lap 122. Ryan Blaney was running ninth when he made an unscheduled stop for a loose right-rear tire on lap 130. Adding insult to injury, he was tagged for speeding entering pit road and was forced to serve a drive-through penalty. Kurt Busch started a wave of green flag stops pitting from fifth on lap 171. Kevin Harvick pitted from second on lap 176. Brad Keselowski pitted from the lead on lap 179 and handed it to teammate Joey Logano. Jimmie Johnson was tagged for speeding on pit road and was forced to serve a drive-through penalty. Debris in turn 2 brought out the fourth caution of the race on lap 189. J. J. Yeley's car blew up in smoke. Logano pitted from the lead and it cycled back to teammate Brad Keselowski.

The race restarted on lap 194. Keselowski lost the lead to Kevin Harvick rounding turns 1 and 2 and took the lead on lap 195. Paul Menard was running eleventh when he made contact with Kasey Kahne. He missed pit road the first time around on lap 199 and spun out trying to get onto pit road the next lap. This brought out the fifth caution of the race on lap 200.

The race restarted on lap 204. Clint Bowyer made contact with the turn 2 wall and cut down his right-rear tire with 93 laps to go. Justin Allgaier also had what appeared to be a right-front tire rub with 90 laps to go. Eventually, NASCAR called him to pit road with 88 laps to go. It turns out the smoke was engine related. Oil in turn 2 brought out the sixth caution of the race with 50 laps to go. That oil was from Yeley. Kyle Busch opted not to pit under the caution and assumed the lead.

==== Fourth quarter ====
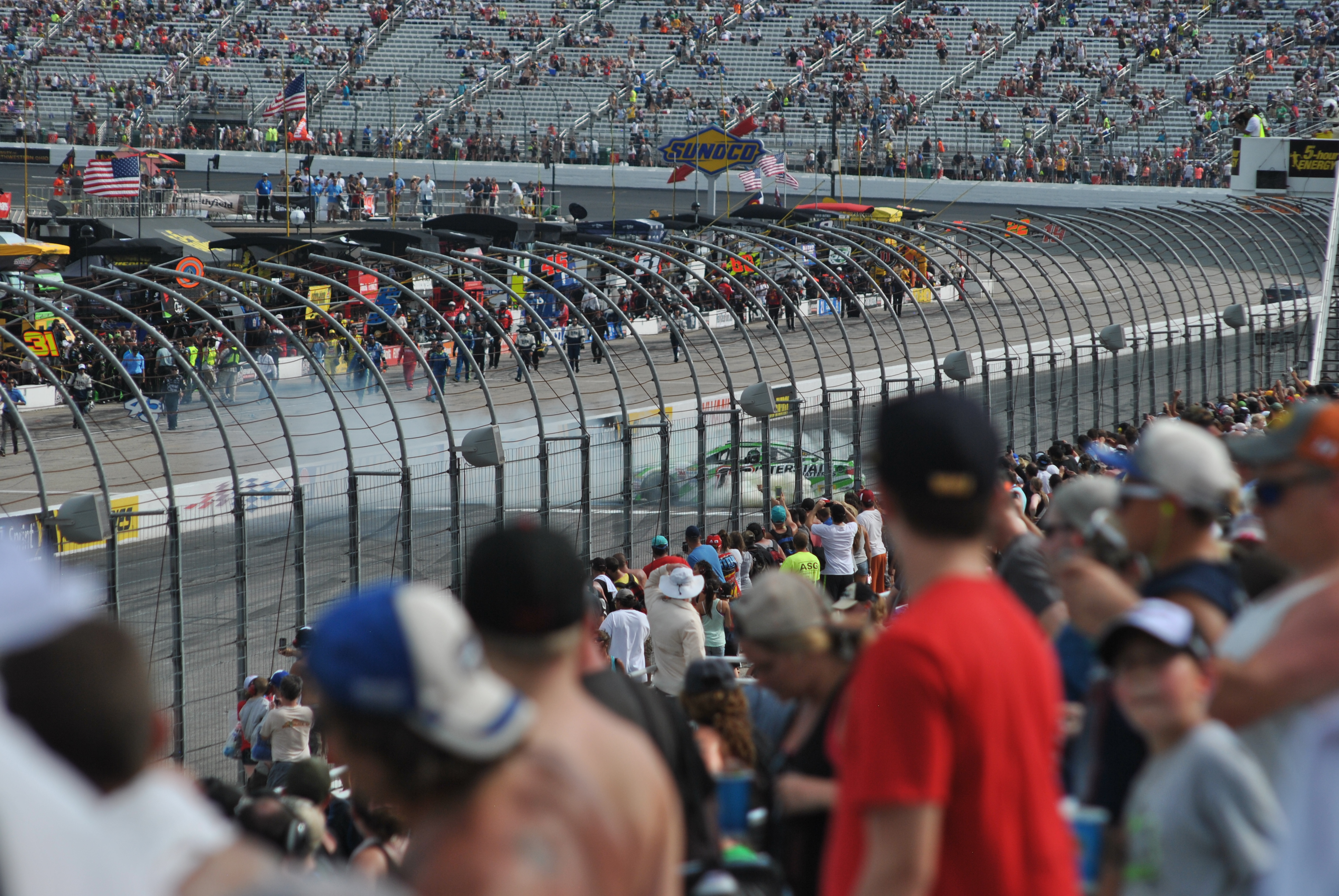
Kyle Busch celebrates his win in the race

The race restarted with 44 laps to go. Kyle Busch jumped to a two-second lead over Brad Keselowski. With five laps to go, Keselowski cut the lead to half a second. He bobbled exiting turn 4 with two to go and Kyle Busch drove off to his third win of the season after Alex Bowman brought out the seventh caution of the race on the final lap.

== Post-race ==
=== Driver comments ===
"We've got to keep doing our deal," said Busch. "Every week it keeps getting better and better." “We had a really fast car and led a lot of laps,” Keselowski said. “I’m really proud of the team for bringing me two fast cars these past two weekends. It’s a joy to drive cars that fast.” “It was hot out there. It was fun,” Dale Earnhardt Jr. explained. “The car didn't really drive that great. We tried to get it better during the race. We had some engine issues. I saw some stuff with the gauges that were way off. We were getting beat down the straightaway all day, even by the Hendrick stuff. Guys will go back and see what's wrong.”

=== Heat and humidity ===
Following the race, Michael Annett and Matt DiBenedetto were transported to the infield care center after showing signs of heat exhaustion and in need of fluids. A. J. Allmendinger was also treated for strep throat. "Everyone is working real hard inside the cars," said Dale Earnhardt Jr. "This is a track where you got to drive real hard every lap. The corners don't work for you to where you can kind of settle into a pace. Just good thing they didn't call any red flags - we would have had some heat strokes out there."

== Race results ==
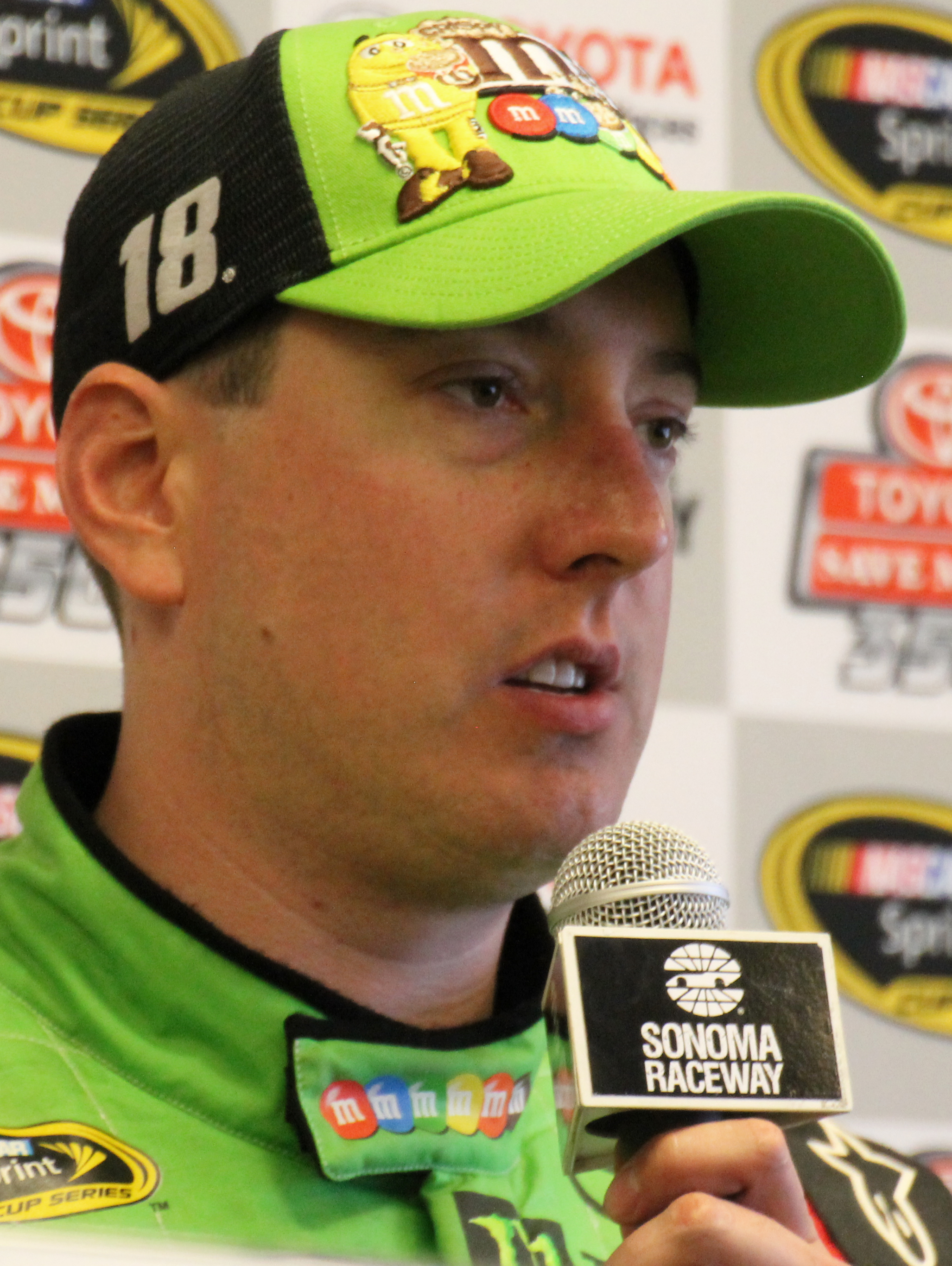
Kyle Busch, seen here at Sonoma Raceway, scored his third victory of the 2015 season.

Pos	No.	Driver	Team	Manufacturer	Laps	Points
1	18	Kyle Busch	Joe Gibbs Racing	Toyota	301	47
2	2	Brad Keselowski	Team Penske	Ford	301	44
3	4	Kevin Harvick	Stewart–Haas Racing	Chevrolet	301	42
4	22	Joey Logano	Team Penske	Ford	301	41
5	88	Dale Earnhardt Jr.	Hendrick Motorsports	Chevrolet	301	40
6	20	Matt Kenseth	Joe Gibbs Racing	Toyota	301	38
7	19	Carl Edwards	Joe Gibbs Racing	Toyota	301	38
8	3	Austin Dillon	Richard Childress Racing	Chevrolet	301	36
9	24	Jeff Gordon	Hendrick Motorsports	Chevrolet	301	36
10	41	Kurt Busch	Stewart–Haas Racing	Chevrolet	301	34
11	31	Ryan Newman	Richard Childress Racing	Chevrolet	301	33
12	78	Martin Truex Jr.	Furniture Row Racing	Chevrolet	301	32
13	47	A. J. Allmendinger	JTG Daugherty Racing	Toyota	301	32
14	11	Denny Hamlin	Joe Gibbs Racing	Toyota	301	30
15	43	Aric Almirola	Richard Petty Motorsports	Ford	301	29
16	13	Casey Mears	Germain Racing	Chevrolet	301	28
17	17	Ricky Stenhouse Jr.	Roush Fenway Racing	Ford	301	27
18	55	David Ragan	Michael Waltrip Racing	Toyota	301	26
19	5	Kasey Kahne	Hendrick Motorsports	Chevrolet	301	25
20	14	Tony Stewart	Stewart–Haas Racing	Chevrolet	301	24
21	38	David Gilliland	Front Row Motorsports	Ford	301	23
22	48	Jimmie Johnson	Hendrick Motorsports	Chevrolet	300	22
23	21	Ryan Blaney (i)	Wood Brothers Racing	Ford	300	0
24	10	Danica Patrick	Stewart–Haas Racing	Chevrolet	300	20
25	27	Paul Menard	Richard Childress Racing	Chevrolet	300	19
26	1	Jamie McMurray	Chip Ganassi Racing	Chevrolet	300	18
27	16	Greg Biffle	Roush Fenway Racing	Ford	299	17
28	35	Cole Whitt	Front Row Motorsports	Ford	299	16
29	9	Sam Hornish Jr.	Richard Petty Motorsports	Ford	299	15
30	40	Landon Cassill (i)	Hillman-Circle Sport LLC	Chevrolet	299	0
31	42	Kyle Larson	Chip Ganassi Racing	Chevrolet	299	13
32	6	Trevor Bayne	Roush Fenway Racing	Ford	299	12
33	34	Brett Moffitt (R)	Front Row Motorsports	Ford	297	11
34	15	Clint Bowyer	Michael Waltrip Racing	Toyota	297	10
35	83	Matt DiBenedetto (R)	BK Racing	Toyota	296	9
36	46	Michael Annett	HScott Motorsports	Chevrolet	296	8
37	32	Eddie MacDonald	Go FAS Racing	Ford	295	7
38	98	Timmy Hill (i)	Premium Motorsports	Ford	292	0
39	33	Derek White (i)	Hillman-Circle Sport LLC	Chevrolet	290	0
40	51	Justin Allgaier	HScott Motorsports	Chevrolet	284	4
41	26	Jeb Burton (R)	BK Racing	Toyota	239	3
42	7	Alex Bowman	Tommy Baldwin Racing	Chevrolet	230	2
43	23	J. J. Yeley (i)	BK Racing	Toyota	202	0
Official 5-hour Energy 301 results

=== Race statistics ===
- 9 lead changes among 7 different drivers
- 7 cautions for 34 laps
- Time of race: 2 hours, 56 minutes, 6 seconds
- Average speed: 108.504 mph (174.620 km/h)
- Kyle Busch took home $276,431 in winnings

Lap Leaders
Laps	Leader
1-19	Carl Edwards
20-66	Kyle Busch
67-88	Brad Keselowski
89-90	Jeff Gordon
91-103	A. J. Allmendinger
104-178	Brad Keselowski
179-190	Joey Logano
191-193	Brad Keselowski
194-252	Kevin Harvick
253-301	Kyle Busch

Total laps led
Leader	Laps
Brad Keselowski	100
Kyle Busch	96
Kevin Harvick	59
Carl Edwards	19
A. J. Allmendinger	13
Joey Logano	12
Jeff Gordon	2

==== Race awards ====
- Coors Light Pole Award: Carl Edwards (28.179, 135.164 mph (217.525 km/h))
- 3M Lap Leader: Brad Keselowski (100 laps)
- American Ethanol Green Flag Restart Award: Kyle Busch
- Duralast Brakes "Bake In The Race" Award: Kyle Busch
- Freescale "Wide Open": Kevin Harvick
- Ingersoll Rand Power Move: David Gilliland (2 positions)
- MAHLE Clevite Engine Builder of the Race: Roush-Yates Engines, #2
- Mobil 1 Driver of the Race: Kyle Busch (137.2 driver rating)
- Moog Steering and Suspension Problem Solver of The Race: Austin Dillon (crew chief Richard Labbe (0.003 seconds))
- NASCAR Sprint Cup Leader Bonus: No winner: rolls over to $160,000 at next event
- Sherwin-Williams Fastest Lap: Kyle Busch (Lap 5, 29.166, 130.591 mph (210.166 km/h))
- Sunoco Rookie of The Race: Brett Moffitt

== Media ==
=== Television ===
NBC Sports covered the race. Rick Allen, Jeff Burton – the all-time wins leader at New Hampshire Motor Speedway with four victories – and Steve Letarte had the call in the booth for the race. Dave Burns, Mike Massaro, Marty Snider and Kelli Stavast handled pit road for the television side.

NBCSN
Booth announcers	Pit reporters
Lap-by-lap: Rick Allen; Color-commentator: Jeff Burton; Color-commentator: Steve Letarte	Dave Burns; Mike Massaro; Marty Snider; Kelli Stavast

=== Radio ===
PRN had the radio call for the race, which was simulcast on Sirius XM NASCAR Radio. Doug Rice, Mark Garrow and Wendy Venturini called the race from the booth when the field was racing down the front stretch. Rob Albright called the race from a billboard outside turn 2 when the field was racing through turns 1 & 2. Pat Patterson called the race from atop the turn 4 stands when the field was racing through turns 3 & 4. Brad Gillie, Brett McMillan, Jim Noble and Steve Richards worked pit road for the radio side.

PRN
Booth announcers	Turn announcers	Pit reporters
Lead announcer: Doug Rice; Announcer: Mark Garrow; Announcer: Wendy Venturini	Turns 1 & 2: Rob Albright; Turns 3 & 4: Pat Patterson	Brad Gillie; Brett McMillan; Jim Noble; Steve Richards

== Standings after the race ==
Drivers' Championship standings

	Pos	Driver	Points
	1	Kevin Harvick	734
1	2	Joey Logano	665 (–69)
1	3	Dale Earnhardt Jr.	655 (–79)
2	4	Jimmie Johnson	646 (–88)
	5	Martin Truex Jr.	628 (–106)
	6	Brad Keselowski	603 (–131)
2	7	Matt Kenseth	578 (–156)
	8	Kurt Busch	576 (–158)
2	9	Jamie McMurray	574 (–160)
	10	Jeff Gordon	573 (–161)
	11	Denny Hamlin	552 (–182)
	12	Kasey Kahne	538 (–196)
1	13	Ryan Newman	530 (–204)
1	14	Paul Menard	528 (–206)
1	15	Aric Almirola	502 (–232)
1	16	Clint Bowyer	500 (–234)

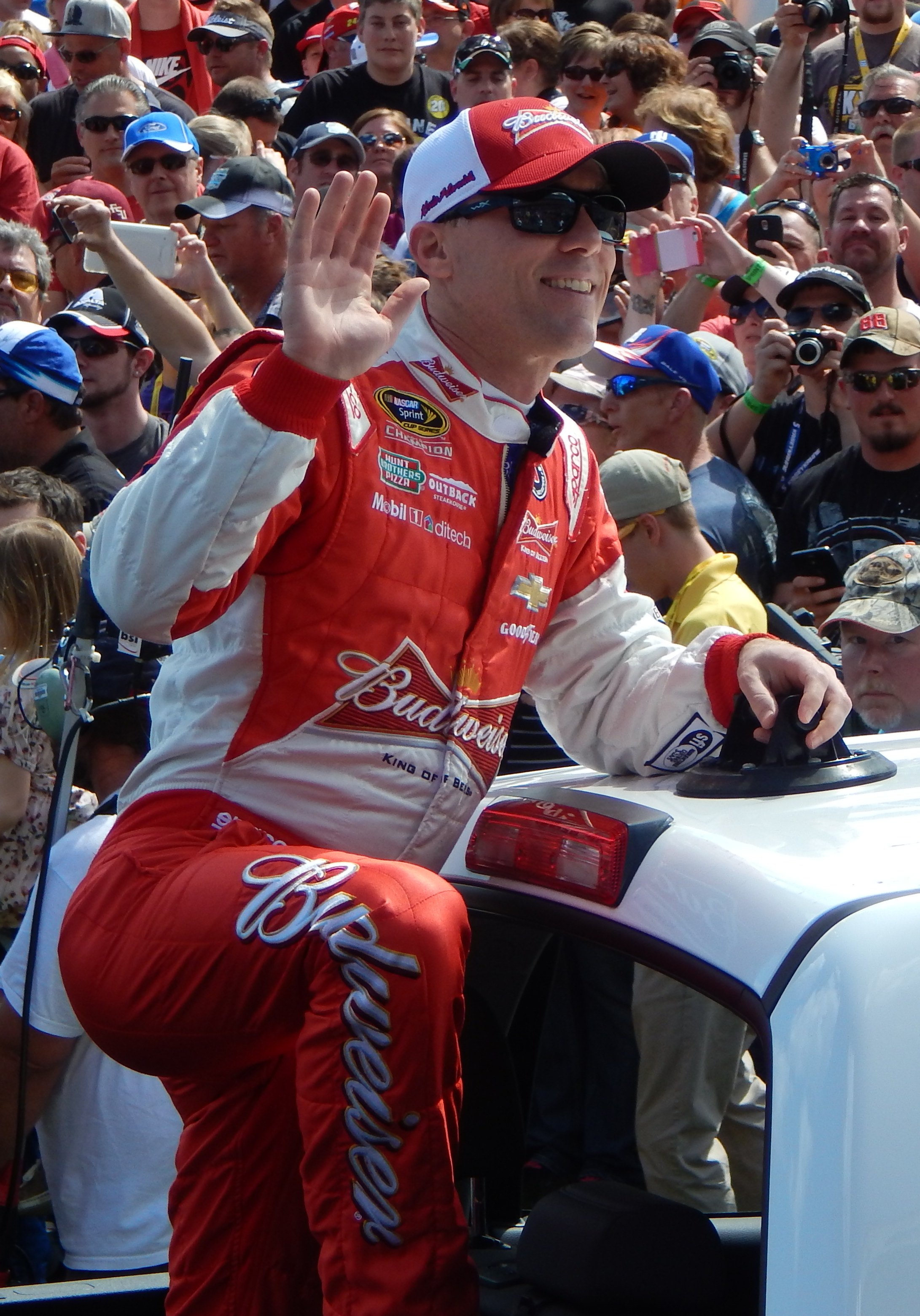
Kevin Harvick left Loudon with a 69-point lead over Joey Logano.

Manufacturers' Championship standings

Pos	Manufacturer	Points
1	Chevrolet	853
2	Ford	778 (–75)
3	Toyota	769 (–89)

- Note: Only the first sixteen positions are included for the driver standings.

Previous race: 2015 Quaker State 400	Sprint Cup Series; 2015 season	Next race: 2015 Brickyard 400
