= 2014 Camping World RV Sales 301 =

Race details
- Race 19 of 36 in the 2014 NASCAR Sprint Cup Series
- Date: July 13, 2014
- Location: New Hampshire Motor Speedway, Loudon, New Hampshire
- Course: Permanent racing facility
- Course length: 1.058 miles (1.703 km)
- Distance: 305 laps, 322.690 mi (519.319 km)
- Scheduled distance: 301 laps, 318.458 mi (512.508 km)
- Weather: Partly cloudy with temperatures up to 81 °F (27 °C); wind out of the SSW at 15 miles per hour (24 km/h)
- Average speed: 108.741 mph (175.002 km/h)

Pole position
Driver	Kyle Busch	Joe Gibbs Racing
- Time: 27.574

Most laps led
Driver	Brad Keselowski	Team Penske
- Laps: 138

Winner
No. 2	Brad Keselowski	Team Penske

Television in the United States
- Network: TNT & PRN
- Announcers: Adam Alexander, Wally Dallenbach Jr. and Kyle Petty (Television); Doug Rice and Mark Garrow (Booth); Rob Albright (Backstretch) (Radio)
- Nielsen ratings: 2.7/6; 4.3 Million viewers

The 2014 Camping World RV Sales 301 was a NASCAR Sprint Cup Series stock car race that was held on July 13, 2014, at New Hampshire Motor Speedway in Loudon, New Hampshire. Contested over 305 laps, it was the 19th race of the 2014 NASCAR Sprint Cup Series season. This race was the last NASCAR broadcast for TNT until 2025, ending a 32-year broadcast partnership with Turner Sports. Brad Keselowski won the race after leading 138 laps. Kyle Busch was second, while Kyle Larson (finishing as the best rookie), Matt Kenseth, and Ryan Newman rounded out the top five. Behind Larson, the top rookies of the race were Austin Dillon in 14th, and Cole Whitt in 28th.

== Report ==
=== Background ===
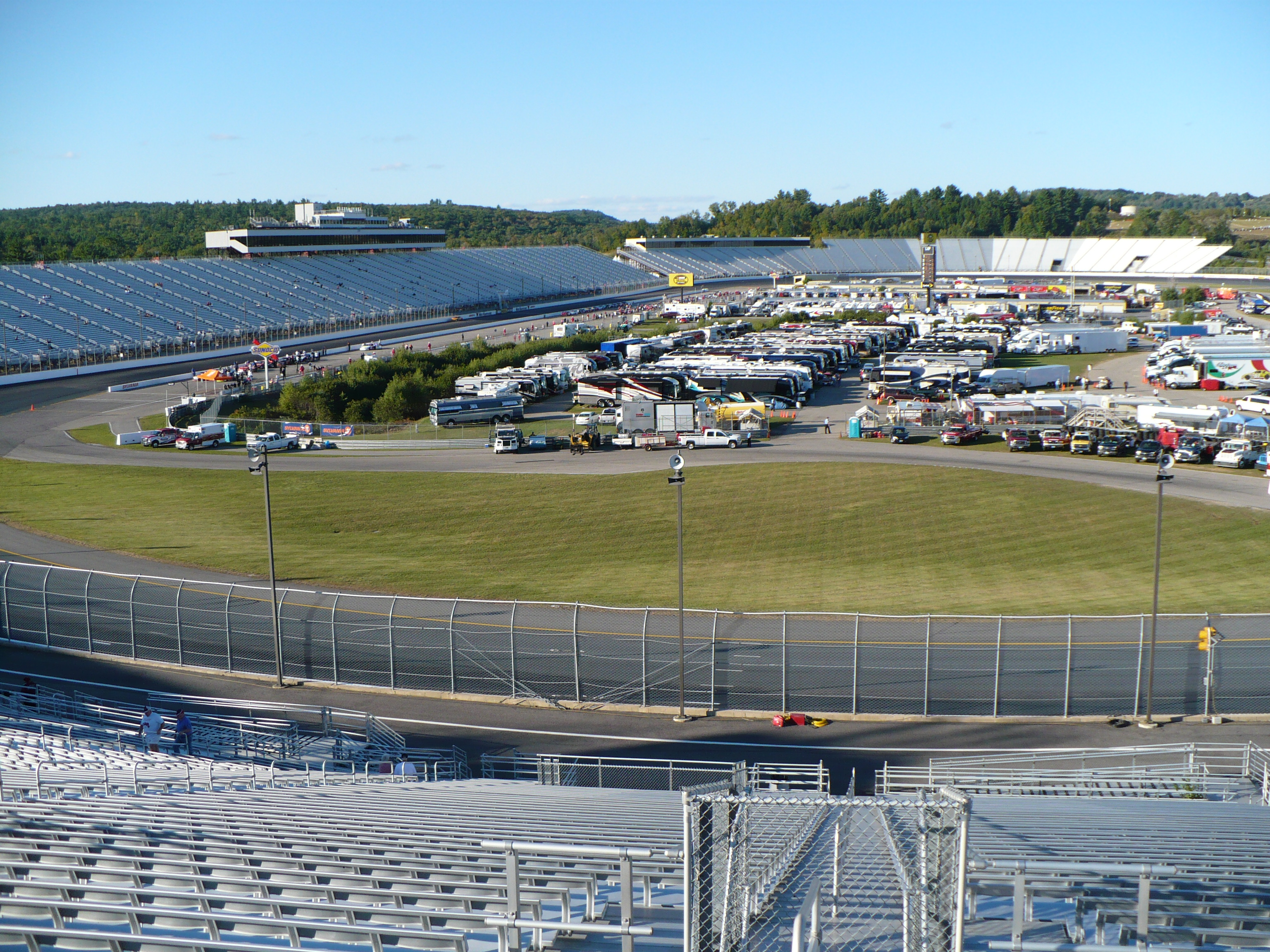
New Hampshire Motor Speedway's infield and front straightaway from turn two grandstands.

The track, New Hampshire Motor Speedway, opened June 5, 1990, as a four-turn oval track, 1.058 miles (1.703 km) long. The track's turns are banked at two to seven degrees, while the front stretch, the finish line, and the back stretch are banked at one degree and are 1,500 feet in length. The track has a grandstand seating capacity of 93,521 spectators. Brian Vickers was the defending race winner from the 2013 race.

=== Entry list ===
The entry list for the Camping World RV Sales 301 was released on Tuesday, July 8, 2014, at 11:18 a.m. Eastern time. Forty-three drivers were entered for the race.

No.	Driver	Team	Manufacturer
1	Jamie McMurray	Chip Ganassi Racing	Chevrolet
2	Brad Keselowski (PC2)	Team Penske	Ford
3	Austin Dillon (R)	Richard Childress Racing	Chevrolet
4	Kevin Harvick	Stewart–Haas Racing	Chevrolet
5	Kasey Kahne	Hendrick Motorsports	Chevrolet
7	Michael Annett (R)	Tommy Baldwin Racing	Chevrolet
9	Marcos Ambrose	Richard Petty Motorsports	Ford
10	Danica Patrick	Stewart–Haas Racing	Chevrolet
11	Denny Hamlin	Joe Gibbs Racing	Toyota
13	Casey Mears	Germain Racing	Chevrolet
14	Tony Stewart (PC3)	Stewart–Haas Racing	Chevrolet
15	Clint Bowyer	Michael Waltrip Racing	Toyota
16	Greg Biffle	Roush Fenway Racing	Ford
17	Ricky Stenhouse Jr.	Roush Fenway Racing	Ford
18	Kyle Busch	Joe Gibbs Racing	Toyota
20	Matt Kenseth (PC5)	Joe Gibbs Racing	Toyota
22	Joey Logano	Team Penske	Ford
23	Alex Bowman (R)	BK Racing	Toyota
24	Jeff Gordon (PC6)	Hendrick Motorsports	Chevrolet
26	Cole Whitt (R)	BK Racing	Toyota
27	Paul Menard	Richard Childress Racing	Chevrolet
31	Ryan Newman	Richard Childress Racing	Chevrolet
32	Eddie MacDonald	Go FAS Racing	Ford
33	Morgan Shepherd (i)	Hillman-Circle Sport LLC	Chevrolet
34	David Ragan	Front Row Motorsports	Ford
36	Reed Sorenson	Tommy Baldwin Racing	Chevrolet
38	David Gilliland	Front Row Motorsports	Ford
40	Landon Cassill (i)	Hillman-Circle Sport LLC	Chevrolet
41	Kurt Busch (PC4)	Stewart–Haas Racing	Chevrolet
42	Kyle Larson (R)	Chip Ganassi Racing	Chevrolet
43	Aric Almirola	Richard Petty Motorsports	Ford
47	A. J. Allmendinger	JTG Daugherty Racing	Chevrolet
48	Jimmie Johnson (PC1)	Hendrick Motorsports	Chevrolet
51	Justin Allgaier (R)	HScott Motorsports	Chevrolet
55	Brian Vickers	Michael Waltrip Racing	Toyota
66	Jeff Burton	Michael Waltrip Racing	Toyota
78	Martin Truex Jr.	Furniture Row Racing	Chevrolet
83	Ryan Truex (R)	BK Racing	Toyota
87	Timmy Hill	Identity Ventures Racing	Toyota
88	Dale Earnhardt Jr.	Hendrick Motorsports	Chevrolet
93	Mike Bliss (i)	BK Racing	Toyota
98	Josh Wise	Phil Parsons Racing	Chevrolet
99	Carl Edwards	Roush Fenway Racing	Ford
Official entry list

Key	Meaning
(R)	Rookie
(i)	Ineligible for points
(PC#)	Past champions provisional

== Practice ==
=== First practice ===
Jimmie Johnson was the fastest in the first practice session with a time of 28.148 and a speed of 135.313 mph (217.765 km/h). Joey Logano crashed his car in turn one after blowing a left-rear tire; he likened the blowout to a similar occurrence in the race in 2013, adding that he was not "even close to saving that. I needed about 500 more yards of straightaway to save that one".

Pos	No.	Driver	Team	Manufacturer	Time	Speed
1	48	Jimmie Johnson	Hendrick Motorsports	Chevrolet	28.148	135.313
2	42	Kyle Larson (R)	Chip Ganassi Racing	Chevrolet	28.169	135.212
3	24	Jeff Gordon	Hendrick Motorsports	Chevrolet	28.179	135.164
Official first practice results

== Qualifying ==
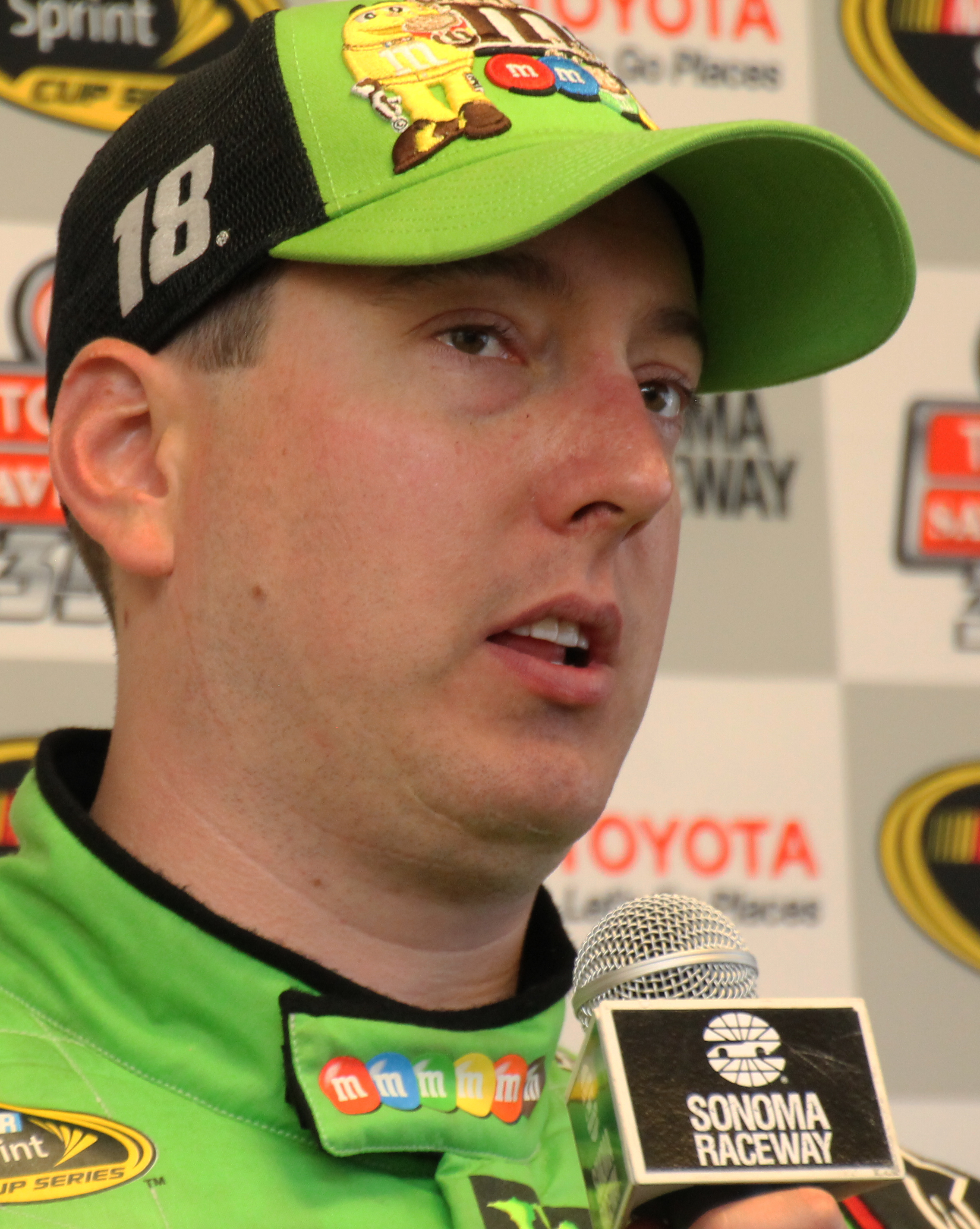
Kyle Busch won the pole position, setting a new track record.

Kyle Busch won the pole with a new track record lap time of 27.574 and a speed of 138.130 mph (222.299 km/h). After qualifying second, Johnson stated that "it's so tough to get a good lap around here...but Kyle found a little bit more out there than us".

=== Qualifying results ===
Pos	No.	Driver	Team	Manufacturer	R1	R2
1	18	Kyle Busch	Joe Gibbs Racing	Toyota	27.820	27.574
2	48	Jimmie Johnson	Hendrick Motorsports	Chevrolet	27.828	27.642
3	11	Denny Hamlin	Joe Gibbs Racing	Toyota	27.762	27.785
4	14	Tony Stewart	Stewart–Haas Racing	Chevrolet	27.893	27.786
5	1	Jamie McMurray	Chip Ganassi Racing	Chevrolet	27.900	27.798
6	22	Joey Logano	Team Penske	Ford	27.776	27.839
7	2	Brad Keselowski	Team Penske	Ford	27.791	27.841
8	15	Clint Bowyer	Michael Waltrip Racing	Toyota	27.870	27.862
9	78	Martin Truex Jr.	Furniture Row Racing	Chevrolet	27.861	27.877
10	5	Kasey Kahne	Hendrick Motorsports	Chevrolet	27.910	27.970
11	24	Jeff Gordon	Hendrick Motorsports	Chevrolet	27.880	27.994
12	4	Kevin Harvick	Stewart–Haas Racing	Chevrolet	27.884	28.024
13	42	Kyle Larson (R)	Chip Ganassi Racing	Chevrolet	27.927	—
14	99	Carl Edwards	Roush Fenway Racing	Ford	27.945	—
15	20	Matt Kenseth	Joe Gibbs Racing	Toyota	27.953	—
16	27	Paul Menard	Richard Childress Racing	Chevrolet	27.953	—
17	55	Brian Vickers	Michael Waltrip Racing	Toyota	27.960	—
18	41	Kurt Busch	Stewart–Haas Racing	Chevrolet	27.968	—
19	43	Aric Almirola (Note: Aric Almirola started last for switching to a backup car post-qualifying.)	Richard Petty Motorsports	Ford	27.971	—
20	47	A. J. Allmendinger	JTG Daugherty Racing	Chevrolet	27.975	—
21	9	Marcos Ambrose	Richard Petty Motorsports	Ford	27.982	—
22	17	Ricky Stenhouse Jr.	Roush Fenway Racing	Ford	28.022	—
23	3	Austin Dillon (R)	Richard Childress Racing	Chevrolet	28.043	—
24	31	Ryan Newman	Richard Childress Racing	Chevrolet	28.064	—
25	51	Justin Allgaier (R)	HScott Motorsports	Chevrolet	28.112	—
26	34	David Ragan	Front Row Motorsports	Ford	28.133	—
27	16	Greg Biffle	Roush Fenway Racing	Ford	28.150	—
28	88	Dale Earnhardt Jr.	Hendrick Motorsports	Chevrolet	28.168	—
29	10	Danica Patrick	Stewart–Haas Racing	Chevrolet	28.189	—
30	66	Jeff Burton	Identity Ventures Racing	Toyota	28.189	—
31	13	Casey Mears	Germain Racing	Chevrolet	28.283	—
32	98	Josh Wise	Phil Parsons Racing	Chevrolet	28.332	—
33	38	David Gilliland	Front Row Motorsports	Ford	28.363	—
34	40	Landon Cassill	Hillman-Circle Sport LLC	Chevrolet	28.506	—
35	26	Cole Whitt (R)	BK Racing	Toyota	28.514	—
36	23	Alex Bowman (R)	BK Racing	Toyota	28.583	—
37	36	Reed Sorenson	Tommy Baldwin Racing	Chevrolet	28.591	—
38	83	Ryan Truex (R)	BK Racing	Toyota	28.816	—
39	7	Michael Annett (R)	Tommy Baldwin Racing	Chevrolet	28.916	—
40	32	Eddie MacDonald	Go FAS Racing	Ford	28.951	—
41	93	Mike Bliss	BK Racing	Toyota	29.124	—
42	87	Timmy Hill	Identity Ventures Racing	Toyota	29.439	—
43	33	Morgan Shepherd	Hillman-Circle Sport LLC	Chevrolet	29.783	—
Official qualifying results

== Practice (post-qualifying) ==
=== Second practice ===
Brad Keselowski was the fastest in the second practice session with a time of 28.478 and a speed of 133.745 mph (215.242 km/h). Aric Almirola was forced to unload his backup car after suffering a left-rear tire blowout like Logano and crashing in turn three. Almirola was perplexed as to the reason why the blowout occurred, describing the situation as "weird".

Pos	No.	Driver	Team	Manufacturer	Time	Speed
1	2	Brad Keselowski	Team Penske	Ford	28.478	133.745
2	1	Jamie McMurray	Chip Ganassi Racing	Chevrolet	28.619	133.086
3	24	Jeff Gordon	Hendrick Motorsports	Chevrolet	28.630	133.035
Official second practice results

=== Final practice ===
Brad Keselowski was the fastest in the final practice session with a time of 28.583 and a speed of 133.254 mph (214.452 km/h).

Pos	No.	Driver	Team	Manufacturer	Time	Speed
1	2	Brad Keselowski	Team Penske	Ford	28.583	133.254
2	24	Jeff Gordon	Hendrick Motorsports	Chevrolet	28.687	132.771
3	11	Denny Hamlin	Joe Gibbs Racing	Toyota	28.694	132.739
Official final practice results

== Race ==
=== First half ===
The race was scheduled to start at 1:16 p.m. Eastern time, but the start was delayed by a few minutes due to technical difficulties before the pre-race command. Kyle Busch eventually led the field to the start. Jimmie Johnson had to make an unscheduled stop for a flat left-rear tire on lap seven, losing a lap in the process. A second blowout for Johnson – a left-front tire – five laps later, saw him hit the wall and brought out the first caution of the race on lap 14. The damage to the car ended Johnson's race, scored in 42nd position. The race restarted on lap 21 with Busch leading the field; he held the lead until the 63rd lap, when his Joe Gibbs Racing teammate Denny Hamlin assumed the lead. Hamlin gave up the lead on lap 74 to make his first stop, and Brad Keselowski assumed the lead. Keselowski ceded the lead to Kyle Larson when he made his pit stop, before the lead cycled back to Hamlin at the completion of green flag pit stops.

=== Second half ===
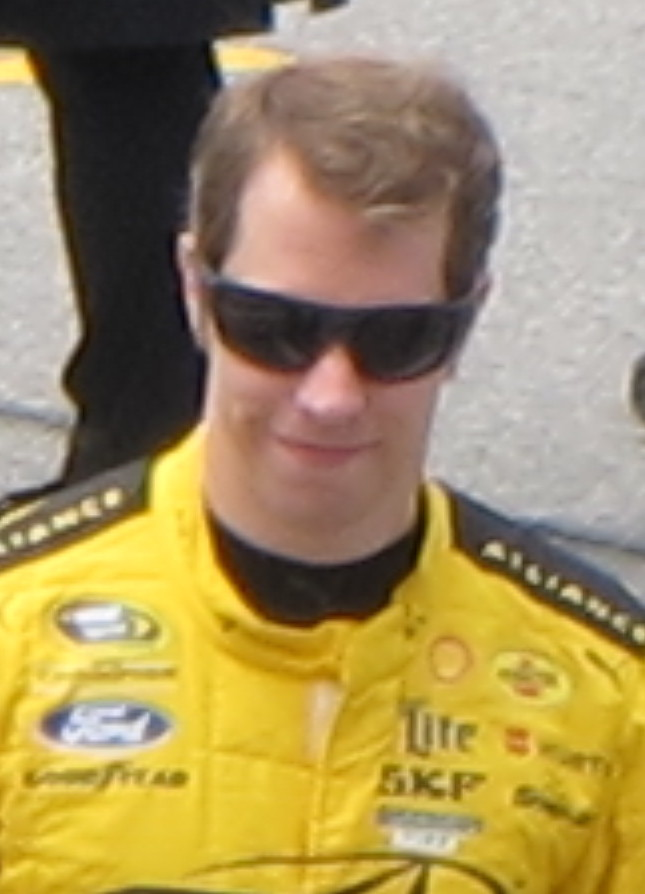
Brad Keselowski won this race.

Keselowski retook the lead on lap 90, and held the lead until the second caution of the race on lap 112, caused by debris. Keselowski lost the lead during the pit cycle; he was beaten out of the pits by Kyle Busch, but Larson had stayed out and assumed the lead. Larson led the field to the restart on lap 119, holding the lead until lap 127, when Matt Kenseth took the lead. On lap 139, Keselowski returned to the lead of the race, and maintained his position until the third caution period of the race, due to debris on the backstretch on lap 153. Joey Logano took the lead during the pit stops, but lost the lead to Clint Bowyer at the restart on lap 158. Keselowski retook the lead on lap 177, just as another debris caution was called for. Keselowski maintained his lead for the next stint of the race, before the caution flag was flown again, on lap 212.

On this occasion, the caution period was down to a collision in turn three, between Logano and Morgan Shepherd, who at 72, was further extending his record of being the oldest driver to compete in a Sprint Cup race. Logano complained that he had “just got taken out by the slowest guy out there", while also stating that NASCAR should implement a driver's test. NASCAR defended Shepherd, saying he passed all the requirements, had his speed monitored, and ran well enough in relation to the leaders not to be black-flagged. NASCAR required that a driver run within 115% of the fastest final practice lap, which was 32.87 seconds at Loudon. Shepherd was well within the limits, running 31-second laps. Shepherd would ultimately finish the race as the last car running, 27 laps down in 39th position. During the pit stops, Bowyer exited first, and led the field to the restart on lap 219.

==== Final laps ====
Keselowski retook the lead on lap 230, holding the lead to the sixth caution of the race, on lap 249 for debris. Jeff Gordon stayed out while the leaders pitted and assumed the lead. Gordon held the lead until 32 laps to go, when Keselowski returned to the lead of the race. Keselowski maintained his lead until the end, despite a seventh caution – which caused a green–white–checker finish – with four laps to go, when Justin Allgaier hit the wall in turn three. Keselowski held off the advances of Kyle Busch to win for the second time in three races, and for the third time in 2014. Keselowski described the performance as "definitely good for when we come back here in September", but also stated that his team "have to keep working and plugging away". Gordon maintained his championship lead, despite running out of fuel in the closing stages, and ultimately finished 26th.

=== Race results ===
Pos	No.	Driver	Team	Manufacturer	Laps	Points
1	2	Brad Keselowski	Team Penske	Ford	305	48
2	18	Kyle Busch	Joe Gibbs Racing	Toyota	305	43
3	42	Kyle Larson (R)	Chip Ganassi Racing	Chevy	305	42
4	20	Matt Kenseth	Joe Gibbs Racing	Toyota	305	41
5	31	Ryan Newman	Richard Childress Racing	Chevrolet	305	39
6	15	Clint Bowyer	Michael Waltrip Racing	Toyota	305	39
7	14	Tony Stewart	Stewart–Haas Racing	Chevrolet	305	37
8	11	Denny Hamlin	Joe Gibbs Racing	Toyota	305	37
9	17	Ricky Stenhouse Jr.	Roush Fenway Racing	Ford	305	35
10	88	Dale Earnhardt Jr.	Hendrick Motorsports	Chevrolet	305	34
11	5	Kasey Kahne	Hendrick Motorsports	Chevrolet	305	33
12	78	Martin Truex Jr.	Furniture Row Racing	Chevrolet	305	32
13	99	Carl Edwards	Roush Fenway Racing	Ford	305	31
14	3	Austin Dillon (R)	Richard Childress Racing	Chevrolet	305	30
15	16	Greg Biffle	Roush Fenway Racing	Ford	305	29
16	1	Jamie McMurray	Chip Ganassi Racing	Chevrolet	305	28
17	41	Kurt Busch	Stewart–Haas Racing	Chevrolet	305	28
18	47	A. J. Allmendinger	JTG Daugherty Racing	Chevrolet	305	26
19	27	Paul Menard	Richard Childress Racing	Chevrolet	305	25
20	66	Jeff Burton	Identity Ventures Racing	Toyota	305	24
21	55	Brian Vickers	Michael Waltrip Racing	Toyota	305	23
22	10	Danica Patrick	Stewart–Haas Racing	Chevrolet	305	22
23	43	Aric Almirola	Richard Petty Motorsports	Ford	305	21
24	38	David Gilliland	Front Row Motorsports	Ford	305	20
25	34	David Ragan	Front Row Motorsports	Ford	305	19
26	24	Jeff Gordon	Hendrick Motorsports	Chevrolet	305	19
27	9	Marcos Ambrose	Richard Petty Motorsports	Ford	304	17
28	26	Cole Whitt (R)	BK Racing	Toyota	304	16
29	98	Josh Wise	Phil Parsons Racing	Ford	304	15
30	4	Kevin Harvick	Stewart–Haas Racing	Chevrolet	304	14
31	23	Alex Bowman (R)	BK Racing	Toyota	303	13
32	7	Michael Annett (R)	Tommy Baldwin Racing	Chevrolet	303	12
33	36	Reed Sorenson	Tommy Baldwin Racing	Chevrolet	302	11
34	40	Landon Cassill	Hillman-Circle Sport LLC	Chevrolet	301	0
35	32	Eddie MacDonald	Go FAS Racing	Ford	300	9
36	83	Ryan Truex (R)	BK Racing	Toyota	300	8
37	51	Justin Allgaier (R)	HScott Motorsports	Chevrolet	296	7
38	13	Casey Mears	Germain Racing	Chevrolet	292	6
39	33	Morgan Shepherd	Hillman-Circle Sport LLC	Chevrolet	278	0
40	22	Joey Logano	Team Penske	Ford	211	5
41	87	Timmy Hill	Identity Ventures Racing	Toyota	76	3
42	48	Jimmie Johnson	Hendrick Motorsports	Chevrolet	11	2
43	93	Mike Bliss	BK Racing	Toyota	6	0

=== Race statistics ===
- Lead changes: 18 among different drivers
- Cautions/Laps: 7 for 35
- Red flags: 0
- Time of race: 2 hours, 58 minutes and 3 seconds
- Average speed: 108.741 miles per hour (175.002 km/h)

== Media ==
=== Television ===
TNT Sports
Booth announcers	Pit reporters
Lap-by-lap: Adam Alexander; Color-commentator: Wally Dallenbach Jr. Color commentator: Kyle Petty	Matt Yocum; Marty Snider; Chris Neville; Ralph Sheheen

=== Radio ===
PRN Radio
Booth announcers	Turn announcers	Pit reporters
Lead announcer: Doug Rice; Announcer: Mark Garrow	Backstretch: Rob Albright	Brett McMillan; Steve Richards; Jim Noble; Wendy Venturini

== Standings after the race ==
Drivers' Championship standings

	Pos	Driver	Points
	1	Jeff Gordon	670
	2	Dale Earnhardt Jr.	658 (−12)
1	3	Brad Keselowski	634 (−36)
1	4	Matt Kenseth	621 (−49)
2	5	Jimmie Johnson	598 (−72)
1	6	Carl Edwards	574 (−96)
1	7	Ryan Newman	573 (−97)
1	8	Kyle Busch	567 (−103)
3	9	Joey Logano	551 (−119)
2	10	Clint Bowyer	548 (−122)
1	11	Paul Menard	541 (−129)
2	12	Denny Hamlin	530 (−140)
2	13	Kevin Harvick	528 (−142)
3	14	Kyle Larson (R)	524 (−146)
2	15	Austin Dillon (R)	524 (−146)
1	16	Greg Biffle	519 (−151)

Manufacturers' Championship standings

Pos	Manufacturer	Points
1	Chevrolet	848
2	Ford	834 (−14)
3	Toyota	766 (−82)

- Note: Only the first sixteen positions are included for the driver standings.

== Notes ==
Previous race: 2014 Coke Zero 400	Sprint Cup Series; 2014 season	Next race: 2014 Brickyard 400
