= 2016 NASCAR Sprint Cup Series =

American motorsport season

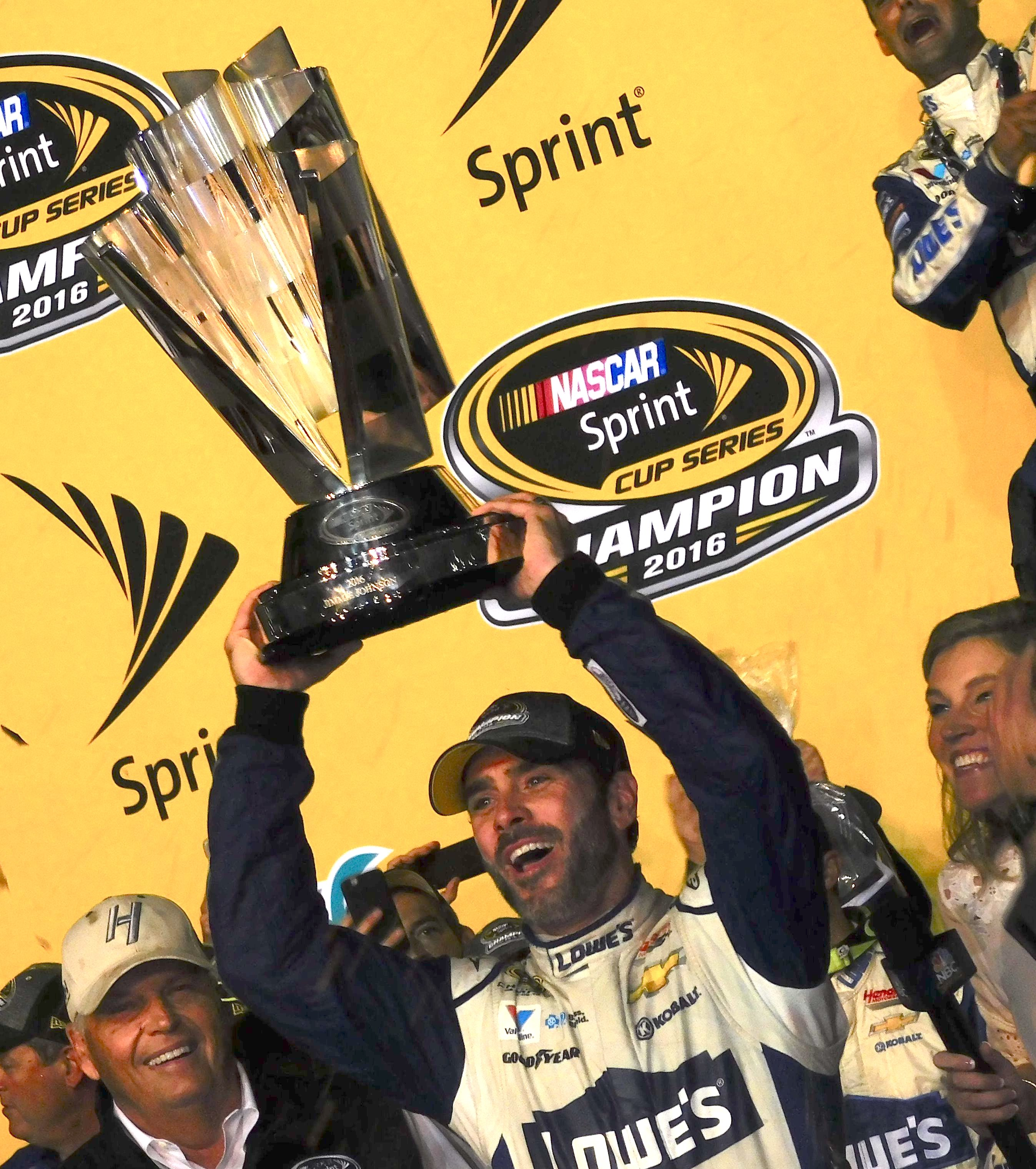
Jimmie Johnson, the 2016 Sprint Cup Series champion, his record-tying seventh title

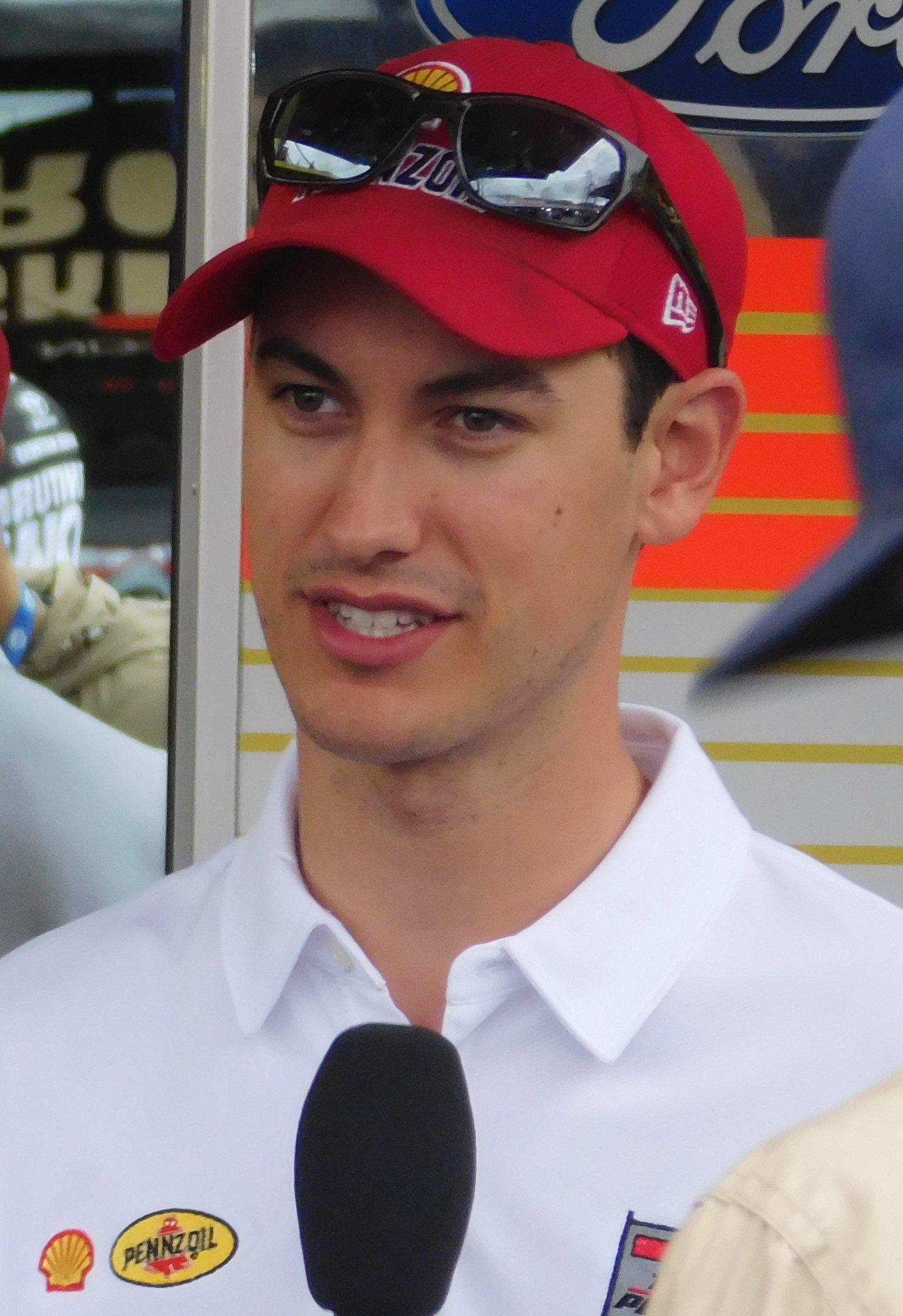
Joey Logano finished 3 points behind Jimmie Johnson in second place.

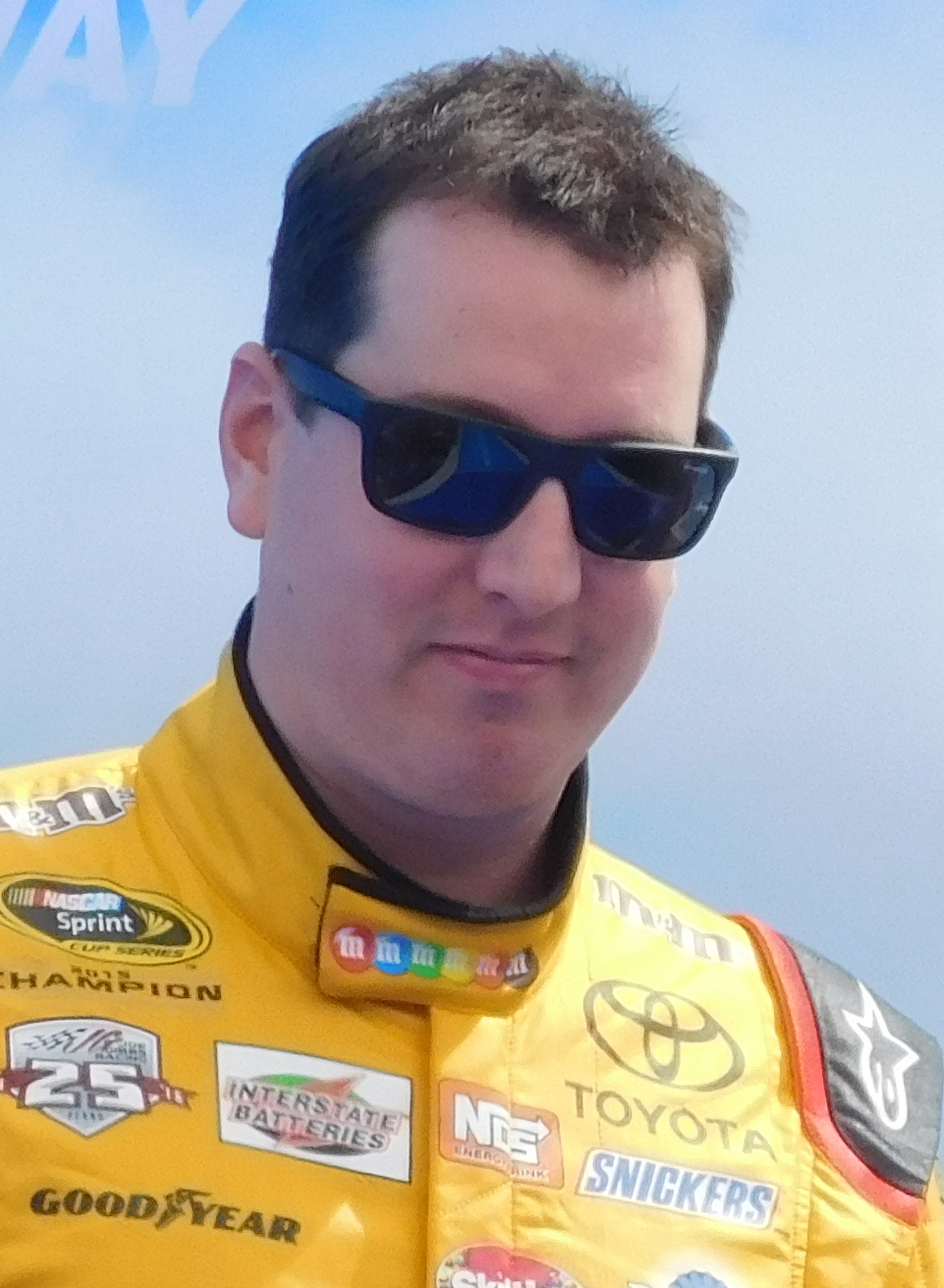
Kyle Busch, the defending champion, finished 5 points behind Jimmie Johnson in third place.

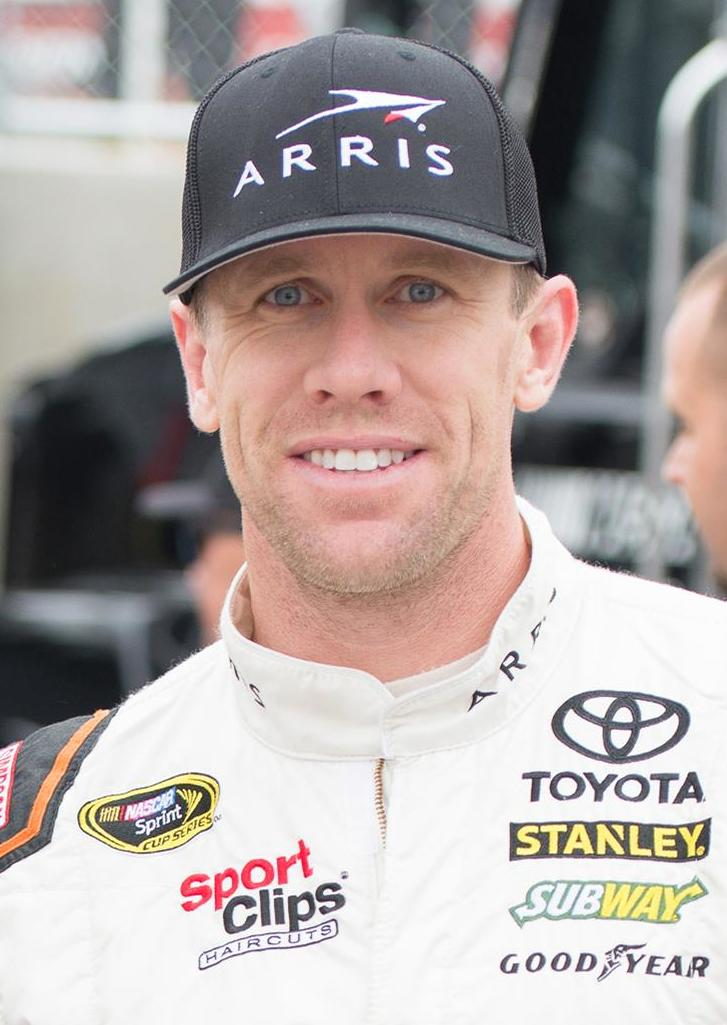
Carl Edwards finished 33 points behind Jimmie Johnson in fourth place in the final season of his career.

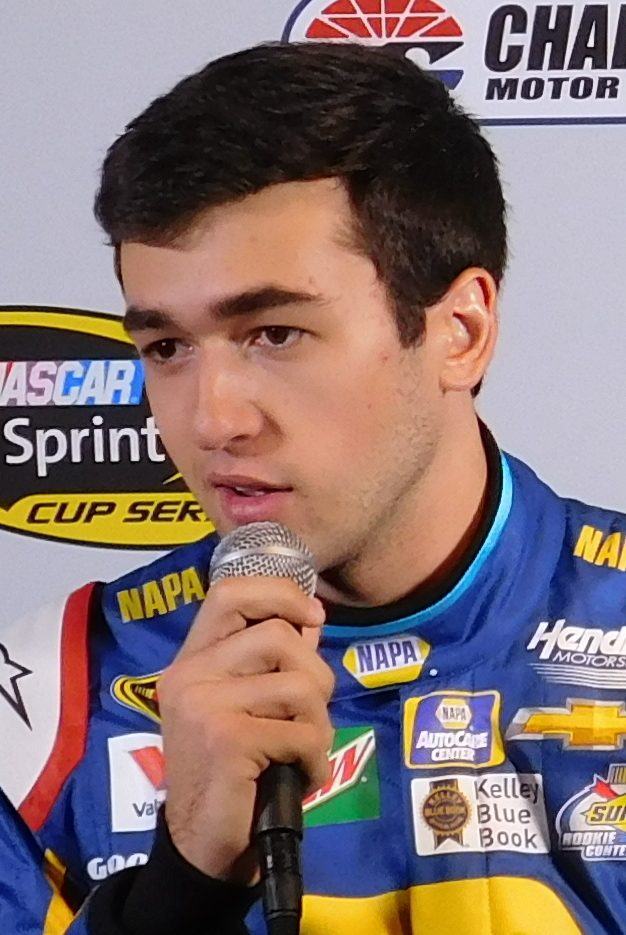
Chase Elliott, the 2016 NASCAR Rookie of the Year

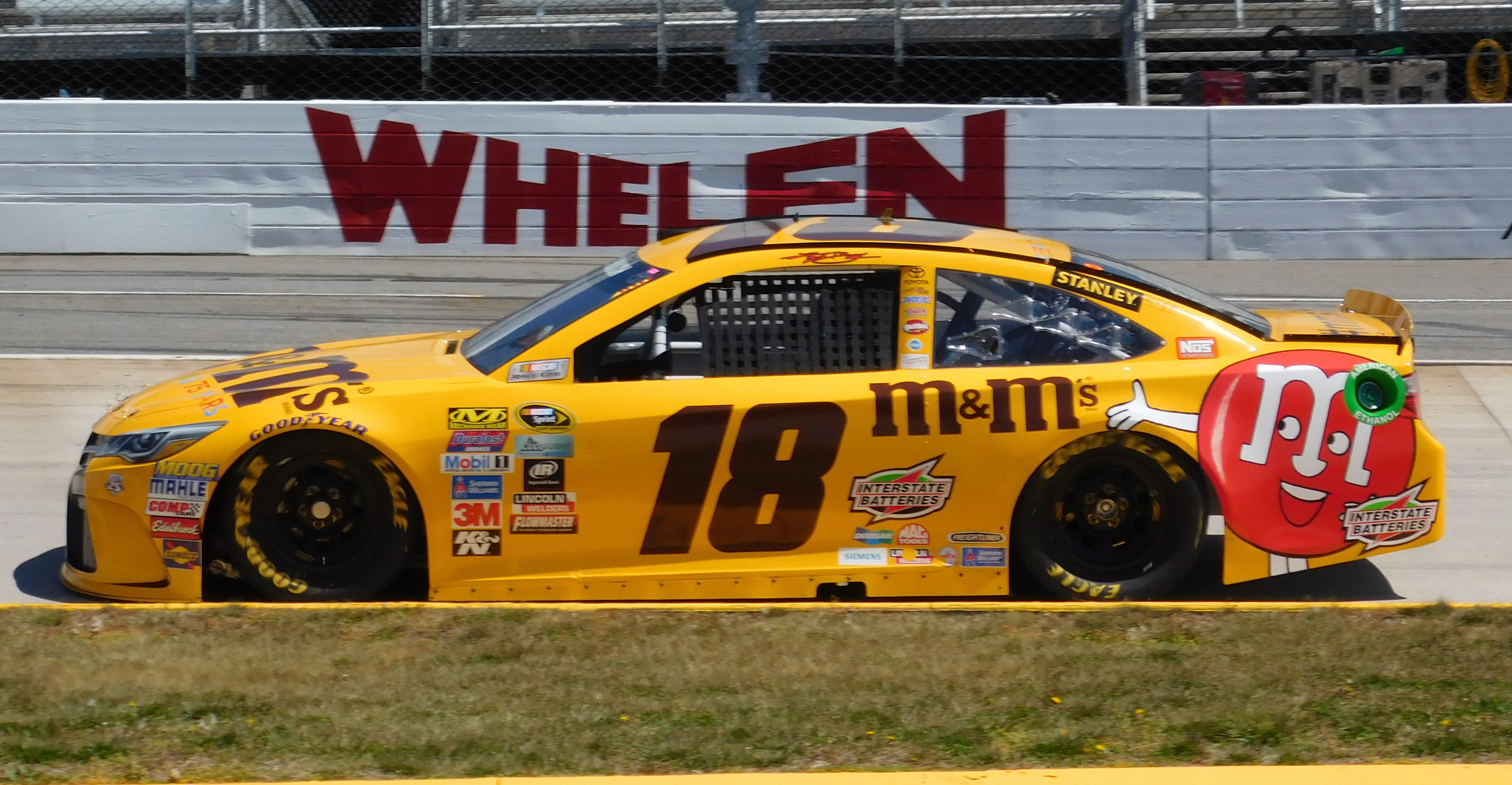
Toyota won their first manufacturer's championship with 14 wins and 1477 points.

The 2016 NASCAR Sprint Cup Series was the 68th season of professional stock car racing in the United States and the 45th modern-era Cup series season. The season began at Daytona International Speedway with the Sprint Unlimited, the Can-Am Duel and the Daytona 500. The season ended with the Ford EcoBoost 400 at Homestead-Miami Speedway. Jimmie Johnson of Hendrick Motorsports won his seventh drivers' championship, tying Richard Petty and Dale Earnhardt for most all-time. Toyota won the manufacturer's championship, becoming the first manufacturer to win the manufacturer's championship other than Chevrolet since 2002.

The season also marked the second season of a new television contract. During the season, races were broadcast in the United States by Fox Sports and NBC Sports.

2016 marked the final full season for three-time NASCAR Cup Series champion Tony Stewart, 2000 season champion Bobby Labonte (at the time he was a restrictor plate ringer), 28-time race winner Carl Edwards, and 19-time race winner Greg Biffle, and the final Cup race starts for Brian Scott, Josh Wise, Brian Vickers, Michael Annett, Patrick Carpentier, Eddie MacDonald, Robert Richardson Jr., and Alex Kennedy. Four-time NASCAR Cup Series champion Jeff Gordon also came out of retirement mid-season as a relief driver for Dale Earnhardt Jr., who sat out the second half of the season with a concussion. Gordon shared relief driving duties on the Hendrick No. 88 car with Alex Bowman and made his final Cup Series start at Martinsville Speedway in October. 2016 also marked the first season that Joe Nemechek did not start a Cup race since his career began in 1993, as well as Sam Hornish Jr., who did not make any starts for the first time since 2006.

The season also marked the final season with Sprint as the series sponsor, as Monster Energy took over the title sponsorship starting in 2017.

== Teams and drivers ==
=== Chartered teams ===
There were 37 full-time teams in 2016.

Manufacturer	Team	No.	Race driver	Crew chief
Chevrolet	Chip Ganassi Racing	1	Jamie McMurray	Matt McCall
Chevrolet	Chip Ganassi Racing	42	Kyle Larson	Chad Johnston 35; Phil Surgen 1
Chevrolet	Germain Racing	13	Casey Mears	Bootie Barker
Chevrolet	Hendrick Motorsports	5	Kasey Kahne	Keith Rodden
Chevrolet	Hendrick Motorsports	24	Chase Elliott (R)	Alan Gustafson
Chevrolet	Hendrick Motorsports	48	Jimmie Johnson	Chad Knaus
Chevrolet	Hendrick Motorsports	88	Dale Earnhardt Jr. 18	Greg Ives
Chevrolet	Hendrick Motorsports	88	Alex Bowman 10	Greg Ives
Chevrolet	Hendrick Motorsports	88	Jeff Gordon 8	Greg Ives
Chevrolet	HScott Motorsports	15	Clint Bowyer	Steve Addington 35; Jay Guy 1
Chevrolet	HScott Motorsports	46	Michael Annett 35	Jay Guy 20; Mike Hillman 16
Chevrolet	HScott Motorsports	46	Justin Allgaier 1	Jay Guy 20; Mike Hillman 16
Chevrolet	JTG Daugherty Racing	47	A. J. Allmendinger	Randall Burnett 35; Ernie Cope 1
Chevrolet	Circle Sport – Leavine Family Racing			
Chevrolet	Circle Sport – Leavine Family Racing	95	Ty Dillon 7	Todd Parrott 11; Dave Winston 24; Matt Borland 1
Chevrolet	Circle Sport – Leavine Family Racing	95	Michael McDowell 29	Todd Parrott 11; Dave Winston 24; Matt Borland 1
Chevrolet	Richard Childress Racing	3	Austin Dillon	Slugger Labbe
Chevrolet	Richard Childress Racing	27	Paul Menard	Justin Alexander 20; Danny Stockman Jr. 16
Chevrolet	Richard Childress Racing	31	Ryan Newman	Luke Lambert
Chevrolet	Stewart–Haas Racing	4	Kevin Harvick	Rodney Childers 35; Dax Gerringer 1
Chevrolet	Stewart–Haas Racing	10	Danica Patrick	Billy Scott
Chevrolet	Stewart–Haas Racing	14	Brian Vickers 5	Mike Bugarewicz
Chevrolet	Stewart–Haas Racing	14	Ty Dillon 3	Mike Bugarewicz
Chevrolet	Stewart–Haas Racing	14	Tony Stewart 28	Mike Bugarewicz
Chevrolet	Stewart–Haas Racing	41	Kurt Busch	Tony Gibson 35; Johnny Klausmeier 1
Chevrolet	Tommy Baldwin Racing	7	Regan Smith 35	Tommy Baldwin Jr.
Chevrolet	Tommy Baldwin Racing	7	Ty Dillon 1	Tommy Baldwin Jr.
Ford	Front Row Motorsports	34	Chris Buescher (R)	Bob Osborne
Ford	Front Row Motorsports	38	Landon Cassill	Donnie Wingo
Ford	Go Fas Racing	32	Bobby Labonte 4	Wally Rogers 35; Clinton Cram 1
Ford	Go Fas Racing	32	Jeffrey Earnhardt (R) 19	Wally Rogers 35; Clinton Cram 1
Ford	Go Fas Racing	32	Joey Gase 6	Wally Rogers 35; Clinton Cram 1
Ford	Go Fas Racing	32	Jeb Burton 2	Wally Rogers 35; Clinton Cram 1
Ford	Go Fas Racing	32	Patrick Carpentier 2	Wally Rogers 35; Clinton Cram 1
Ford	Go Fas Racing	32	Eddie MacDonald 1	Wally Rogers 35; Clinton Cram 1
Ford	Go Fas Racing	32	Boris Said 1	Wally Rogers 35; Clinton Cram 1
Ford	Go Fas Racing	32	Dylan Lupton 1	Wally Rogers 35; Clinton Cram 1
Ford	Richard Petty Motorsports	43	Aric Almirola	Trent Owens 26; Drew Blickensderfer 10
Ford	Richard Petty Motorsports	44	Brian Scott (R)	Chris Heroy
Ford	Roush Fenway Racing	6	Trevor Bayne	Matt Puccia
Ford	Roush Fenway Racing	16	Greg Biffle	Brian Pattie 34; Robbie Reiser 2
Ford	Roush Fenway Racing	17	Ricky Stenhouse Jr.	Nick Sandler 35; Mike Kelley 1
Ford	Team Penske	2	Brad Keselowski	Paul Wolfe
Ford	Team Penske	22	Joey Logano	Todd Gordon
Toyota	BK Racing	23	David Ragan	Patrick Donahue
Toyota	BK Racing	83	Michael Waltrip 1	Doug Richert 4 Gene Nead 31; Mike Ford 1
Toyota	BK Racing	83	Matt DiBenedetto 30	Doug Richert 4 Gene Nead 31; Mike Ford 1
Toyota	BK Racing	83	Dylan Lupton 2	Doug Richert 4 Gene Nead 31; Mike Ford 1
Toyota	BK Racing	83	Jeffrey Earnhardt (R) 3	Doug Richert 4 Gene Nead 31; Mike Ford 1
Toyota	Furniture Row Racing	78	Martin Truex Jr.	Cole Pearn 35; Todd Berrier 1
Toyota	Joe Gibbs Racing	11	Denny Hamlin	Mike Wheeler
Toyota	Joe Gibbs Racing	18	Kyle Busch	Adam Stevens 35; Todd Berrier 1
Toyota	Joe Gibbs Racing	19	Carl Edwards	Dave Rogers
Toyota	Joe Gibbs Racing	20	Matt Kenseth	Jason Ratcliff

=== Non-chartered teams ===
==== Complete schedule ====
Manufacturer	Team	No.	Race driver	Crew chief
Ford	Wood Brothers Racing	21	Ryan Blaney (R)	Jeremy Bullins

==== Limited schedule ====
Manufacturer	Team	No.	Race driver	Crew chief	Round(s)
Chevrolet	Circle Sport – Leavine Family Racing	59	Michael McDowell	Dave Winston	2
Chevrolet	Hillman Racing	40	Reed Sorenson	Pat Tryson	1
Chevrolet	The Motorsports Group	30	Josh Wise	Dave Fuge 31; Wayne Carroll 4	32
Chevrolet	The Motorsports Group	30	Gray Gaulding	Dave Fuge 31; Wayne Carroll 4	3
Ford	Front Row Motorsports	35	David Gilliland	Joe Lax 1 Todd Anderson 3	4
Ford	Roush Fenway Racing	99	Ryan Reed	Phil Gould	1
Toyota	BK Racing	26	Robert Richardson Jr.	Mike Ford	1
Toyota	BK Racing	49	Matt DiBenedetto	Gene Nead	1
Toyota	BK Racing	93	Matt DiBenedetto	Gene Nead	4
Toyota	BK Racing	93	Ryan Ellis	Mike Ford	3
Toyota	BK Racing	93	Dylan Lupton	Mike Ford	1
Chevrolet 24 Toyota 7	Premium Motorsports	55	Reed Sorenson	Pat Tryson 30; Maurice Hester 1	24
Chevrolet 24 Toyota 7	Premium Motorsports	55	Michael Waltrip	Pat Tryson 30; Maurice Hester 1	1
Chevrolet 24 Toyota 7	Premium Motorsports	55	Cole Whitt	Pat Tryson 30; Maurice Hester 1	3
Chevrolet 24 Toyota 7	Premium Motorsports	55	Cody Ware	Pat Tryson 30; Maurice Hester 1	1
Chevrolet 24 Toyota 7	Premium Motorsports	55	Alex Kennedy	Pat Tryson 30; Maurice Hester 1	1
Chevrolet 24 Toyota 7	Premium Motorsports	55	D. J. Kennington	Pat Tryson 30; Maurice Hester 1	1
Chevrolet 26 Toyota 6	Premium Motorsports	98	Cole Whitt	Mark Hillman 23; Ben Leslie 8 Pat Tryson 1	26
Chevrolet 26 Toyota 6	Premium Motorsports	98	Reed Sorenson	Mark Hillman 23; Ben Leslie 8 Pat Tryson 1	4
Chevrolet 26 Toyota 6	Premium Motorsports	98	Ryan Ellis	Mark Hillman 23; Ben Leslie 8 Pat Tryson 1	1
Chevrolet 26 Toyota 6	Premium Motorsports	98	Timmy Hill	Mark Hillman 23; Ben Leslie 8 Pat Tryson 1	1

=== Changes ===
==== Teams ====
- Michael Waltrip Racing ceased its operations after 2015, shutting down the No. 15 and No. 55 teams. Waltrip made plans to run the Daytona 500 with sponsor Maxwell House. Waltrip ran the No. 83 for BK Racing in the Daytona 500 with DiBenedetto moving to the No. 93 in a third BK Racing car for the race. Waltrip also ran the Talladega race in May in his old No. 55 now running under the Premium Motorsports banner. This car had been the No. 62 in 2015.
- Wood Brothers Racing returned to full-time racing in 2016 for the first time since 2008. Ryan Blaney remained as driver, marking the first time the team would full-time with one driver since 2006. The team ran 19 races in 2015.
- Front Row Motorsports downsized to two full-time teams in 2016, shutting down the No. 35 team. The team also received technical support as part of an alliance with Roush Fenway Racing. The team fielded the No. 35 car for David Gilliland in the Daytona 500 and the other 3 plate races. He failed to qualify for the Daytona 500 and the Talladega October events (but made Talladega in May and Daytona in July).
- BK Racing downsized to two full-time teams in 2016, shutting down the No. 26 team. The team fielded the No. 26 car for Robert Richardson Jr. in the Daytona 500.
- Circle Sport and Leavine Family Racing merged to form Circle Sport – Leavine Family Racing. The team ran the full 36-race schedule with the No. 95 in a Chevrolet, forming a technical alliance with Richard Childress Racing. The No. 33 team was shut down. Ty Dillon ran five races with crew chief Todd Parrott, including the Daytona 500 with Michael McDowell driving the other 31 with crew chief Dave Winston. The team fielded a second car, the No. 59, in the Daytona 500 and Ford EcoBoost 400 for McDowell.
- Premium Motorsports hired Mike Hillman to head up its operations in 2016, bringing over Mark Hillman – who served as the No. 40's crew chief – and most of the staff from the No. 40 team, therefore shutting that team down on a full-time basis. Premium Motorsports ran only one full-time team with Cole Whitt in the No. 98 in 2016, shutting down the No. 62. Whitt drove for Front Row Motorsports in the now defunct No. 35 in 2015. Hillman still ran the No. 40 with Reed Sorenson in the Daytona 500. The second Premium team was reactivated at Martinsville as the No. 55, with Sorenson driving.
- Premium Motorsports leased their charter to HScott Motorsports No. 46 for the 2016 season.

==== Drivers ====
- Chase Elliott moved up from the Xfinity Series to the Sprint Cup Series for Hendrick Motorsports, replacing Jeff Gordon in the No. 24, who retired after the 2015 season.
- Clint Bowyer replaced Justin Allgaier in the HScott Motorsports No. 15 (renumbered from No. 51) for 2016, before replacing the retiring Tony Stewart in the No. 14 for Stewart–Haas Racing in 2017. Bowyer ran the No. 15 for the now closed Michael Waltrip Racing team in 2015.
- Brian Scott replaced Sam Hornish Jr. in the Richard Petty Motorsports No. 44 (renumbered from No. 9). Scott ran for Richard Childress Racing in the Xfinity Series in 2015.
- Chris Buescher moved up from the Xfinity Series to the Sprint Cup Series for Front Row Motorsports, replacing Brett Moffitt and other various drivers in the No. 34. Buescher ran six races in the No. 34 in 2015 and won the 2015 Xfinity Series Championship with Roush Fenway Racing in the No. 60. He is on loan from Roush Fenway Racing, with Roush providing additional technical support for him in 2016.
- Landon Cassill replaced David Gilliland in the Front Row Motorsports No. 38. Cassill ran for Hillman Racing in the No. 40 in 2015.
- Jeffrey Earnhardt ran at least 20 races in the No. 32 for Go FAS Racing. Bobby Labonte continued to run the four restrictor plate races. The team had multiple drivers in 2015.
- David Ragan replaced J. J. Yeley and Jeb Burton in the BK Racing No. 23. Ragan drove full-time for various teams – mostly in a substitute role due to injuries – in 2015, mostly for the now defunct Michael Waltrip Racing No. 55.
- Regan Smith replaced Alex Bowman in the Tommy Baldwin Racing No. 7. Smith ran for JR Motorsports in the Xfinity Series in 2015.
- On February 1, 2016, Tony Stewart was sent to the hospital after he injured his back in a non-racing accident in the desert. Stewart–Haas Racing announced on February 4 that Stewart would miss the beginning of the season. Nine days later, former Michael Waltrip Racing driver Brian Vickers was hired to take Stewart's place for the Daytona 500. Vickers and Ty Dillon shared the car until Bristol. Stewart returned to the 14 car at Richmond. For Talladega, Stewart practiced and qualified the car, and then switched with Ty Dillon in the first opportunity during the race. Afterwards, Stewart returned full-time at Kansas.
- Dale Earnhardt Jr. suffered from concussion like symptoms following the race in Kentucky and was replaced by Alex Bowman at New Hampshire and Michigan. Jeff Gordon came out of retirement to replace Dale Jr. at Indianapolis, Pocono, Watkins Glen, and Bristol. It was announced on August 30, 2016, that Earnhardt would miss the rest of the season and that Bowman and Gordon would share the car for the final 12 races of the season. Gordon drove at Darlington, Richmond, Dover, and Martinsville while Bowman drove at Chicagoland, New Hampshire, Charlotte, Kansas, Talladega, Texas, Phoenix, and Homestead.

==== Crew chiefs ====
- Brian Pattie took over crew chief duties on the No. 16 Roush Fenway Racing Ford with Greg Biffle, replacing Matt Puccia. Pattie was the crew chief for the Michael Waltrip Racing No. 15 and No. 55 cars in 2015.
- Matt Puccia took over crew chief duties on the No. 6 Roush Fenway Racing Ford with Trevor Bayne, replacing Bob Osborne. Puccia was the crew chief on the No. 16, driven by Greg Biffle in 2015.
- Bob Osborne took over crew chief duties on the No. 34 Front Row Motorsports Ford with Chris Buescher, replacing Derek Finley. Osborne was the crew chief for Trevor Bayne in 2015.
- Chad Johnston took over crew chief duties on the No. 42 Chip Ganassi Racing Chevrolet with Kyle Larson, replacing Chris Heroy. Johnston was the crew chief for Tony Stewart in 2015.
- Mike Bugarewicz took over crew chief duties on the No. 14 Stewart–Haas Racing Chevrolet with Tony Stewart, replacing Chad Johnston. Bugarewicz was the race engineer on the No. 4, driven by Kevin Harvick, the previous two years.
- Billy Scott took over crew chief duties on the No. 10 Stewart–Haas Racing Chevrolet with Danica Patrick, replacing Daniel Knost. Scott was the crew chief for the Michael Waltrip Racing No. 15 and No. 55 cars in 2015.
- Randall Burnett took over crew chief duties on the No. 47 JTG Daugherty Racing Chevrolet with A. J. Allmendinger, replacing Brian Burns. Burnett was the team engineer on the No. 42, driven by Kyle Larson, in 2015.
- Mike Wheeler took over crew chief duties on the No. 11 Joe Gibbs Racing Toyota with Denny Hamlin, replacing Dave Rogers. Wheeler was the crew chief for the Joe Gibbs Racing No. 20 in the NASCAR Xfinity Series in 2015.
- Dave Rogers took over crew chief duties on the No. 19 Joe Gibbs Racing Toyota with Carl Edwards, replacing Darian Grubb. Rogers was the crew chief on the No. 11, driven by Denny Hamlin, in 2015.
- Chris Heroy took over crew chief duties on the No. 44 Richard Petty Motorsports Ford with Brian Scott, replacing Kevin Manion. Heroy was the crew chief for Kyle Larson in 2015.
- Patrick Donahue took over crew chief duties on the No. 23 BK Racing Toyota with David Ragan, replacing Joe Williams. Donahue was the crew chief for the third BK Racing car, the No. 26, in 2015.
- Wally Rogers took over crew chief duties on the No. 32 Go FAS Racing Ford, replacing Clint Cram. Rogers was the crew chief for the part-time Leavine Family Racing No. 95 in 2015.

==== Manufacturers ====
- Furniture Row Racing changed its manufacturer to Toyota with a technical alliance with Joe Gibbs Racing after being with Chevrolet since the team's inception in 2005.
- Circle Sport - Leavine Family Racing changed its manufacturer to Chevrolet with a technical alliance with Richard Childress Racing after being with Ford since the team's inception in 2011.

== Rule changes ==
- 2016 saw the introduction of a charter system in a deal reached between NASCAR and the Race Team Alliance. Thirty-six teams would hold a charter, which guarantees them a spot in the field for all 36 races. To be eligible for a charter, a team had to be running full-time since the 2013 season. Charter owners may transfer their Charter to another team, for one full season, once over the first five years of the agreement.
- Charter teams are held to a minimum performance standard. If a Charter team finishes in the bottom three of the owner standings among all 36 Charter teams for three consecutive years, NASCAR has a right to force the sale of the charter.
- NASCAR also reduced the size of the Cup field from 43 to 40 cars.
- Teams may sell their Charters on the open market before each season.
- Organizations had a hard cap of four cars; prohibiting a fifth car for rookie drivers. For example, Joe Gibbs Racing had planned to run Erik Jones on a limited Cup schedule in addition to the full Xfinity Series schedule; if they wanted to run Jones in any Cup races, under this new rule they would have had to farm him out to another team, likely Furniture Row Racing, who was seeking to add a second team in 2017.
- Due to the charters and reduction of field size, the qualifying procedures were revised. The final four spots for non-chartered teams are determined by qualifying results. If qualifying was rained out, practice speeds were used. If practice and qualifying are rained out, owner points were used. For the Daytona 500 only, the final four teams are the highest non-charter finisher in each duel plus the two highest qualifiers that did not clinch a spot in the duel.
- Due to the field shortening from 43 to 40 cars, the point system was revised to 1 point for 40th place up to 40 points for 1st place. All other bonuses points, including the win bonus and laps lead bonus points, are the same.
- 2016 also introduced the "Overtime Line" as a modification for the green–white–checker finish rule. After taking the green flag, if a caution appears before the leader has reached the overtime line, the restart was waved off and another attempt would be made. There were an unlimited number of attempts for this, however once the leader reaches the line, the next flag ended the race. The placement of the overtime line varied from track to track.
- Starting at Kentucky, if qualifying gets rained out the field would be set by the point standings. If the field was over 40 cars, the drivers who were on open teams that are further up in points made the race while the drivers low in standings failed to make the race.
- On July 7, 2016, it was announced that any driver that was part of an open team that made the Chase was guaranteed a spot in all 10 Chase races.

=== Technical changes ===
All cars began using a digital dashboard starting in 2016. The dashboard only provided information that was available on manual gauges and lap times, but there were plans to work in tire pressure readings and other telemetry to drivers, teams, and fans at home.

At all tracks except Daytona and Talladega:

- The rear spoiler height was reduced from 6 inches to 3.5 inches.
- The front splitter leading edge was reduced from 2 inches to 0.25 inches.
- The radiator pan width was reduced from 38 inches to 33 inches.
- Rear gear ratios were adjusted to maintain 9,000 RPM maximum.
- For tracks shorter than 1.25 miles in length, the third gear ratio was 1.38.

At Daytona and Talladega:

- Engine roller lifters replaced solid lifters, adding around 10 horsepower to each car.
- Restrictor plates had the openings reduced from 29/32 inches to 57/64 inches to counter the horsepower increase.
- Starting at the July Daytona race, each car ran a standardized radiator and oil cooler system.

Safety enhancements at all tracks:

- There must be an on-board fire suppression system activation cable routed to the dash or right-hand side leg board.
- There must be a right-hand side double NACA duct to cool drivers at tracks where the side window is used.
- Seat belt restraint systems must meet increased specifications.

Other changes:

- All track bar and wedge wrenches must be painted yellow.
- NASCAR changed inspection methods, reducing pre-race inspection time but increasing the amount of time teams have to present their cars for pre-qualifying inspection. In addition, NASCAR utilized new inspection methods aided by Microsoft Surface tablets to further increase efficiencies.
- Beginning at the May Talladega race, NASCAR began enforcing lug nuts again, a practice which was discontinued after the 2013 season. The rule now required all 5 lug nuts on all 4 wheels must be "installed in a safe and secure manner." If during post-race inspection a wheel is found to be missing a lug nut or a lug not is not secured, it was an automatic P3 penalty resulting in the crew chief, tire changer, and tire carrier each receiving a one race suspension and fine. The change comes after mass criticism, particularly from owner-driver Tony Stewart, about poor safety practices occurring from lack of enforcement.
- Starting at the fall Talladega race, NASCAR allowed teams to run additional anti-intrusion panels at superspeedway races. The components are optional for 2016, required at superspeedway races in 2017, and required at all races in 2018. The changes come as a result of the investigation into the horrific last lap crash suffered by Austin Dillon in the 2015 Coke Zero 400.

== Schedule ==
The final calendar – comprising 36 races, as well as exhibition races, which are the Sprint Unlimited, Can-Am Duel qualifying duel races for the Daytona 500 and the Sprint All-Star Race – was released on October 26, 2015. With the schedule announcement also came the announcement of NASCAR securing a five-year contract with each track to continue to host races over the next five seasons. Key changes from 2015 include:

- The Easter off-week was placed late-March between Fontana and Martinsville, instead of the mid-April break between Martinsville and Texas as in recent years.
- The Coke Zero 400 at Daytona returned to its usual Saturday night date.
- The spring race at Richmond moved from Saturday night to Sunday afternoon.
- Michigan and Bristol swapped their August race dates to avoid a scheduling conflict with the 2016 Summer Olympics being hosted on NBC.
- The third off-week was moved to mid-August between Watkins Glen and Bristol, instead of the usual late-August break between Bristol and Darlington. This was done so as to avoid a scheduling conflict with the 2016 Summer Olympics being hosted on NBC. The aforementioned Olympics conflict forced one race occurring during the games (Watkins Glen) to be moved to USA, marking the first time USA had broadcast a NASCAR Cup race since the 1984 UNO Twin 125s. (The other race occurring during the games, at Bristol, aired on NBCSN.)
- The first race at Dover and the Memorial Day week swapped dates, so the last race before the All-Star Race was Dover instead of Kansas.
- In the Chase for the Sprint Cup, the three rounds preceding the final race, originally named the Challenger, Contender and Eliminator rounds, were simply renamed the Round of 16, the Round of 12 and the Round of 8 respectively.

No	Race title	Track	Date	Time (ET)
	Sprint Unlimited	Daytona International Speedway, Daytona Beach	February 13	8:00 PM
	Can-Am Duel	Daytona International Speedway, Daytona Beach	February 18	7:00 PM
1	Daytona 500	Daytona International Speedway, Daytona Beach	February 21	1:00 PM
2	Folds of Honor QuikTrip 500	Atlanta Motor Speedway, Hampton	February 28	1:00 PM
3	Kobalt 400	Las Vegas Motor Speedway, Las Vegas	March 6	3:30 PM
4	Good Sam 500	Phoenix International Raceway, Avondale	March 13	3:30 PM
5	Auto Club 400	Auto Club Speedway, Fontana	March 20	3:30 PM
6	STP 500	Martinsville Speedway, Ridgeway	April 3	1:00 PM
7	Duck Commander 500	Texas Motor Speedway, Fort Worth	April 9	7:30 PM
8	Food City 500	Bristol Motor Speedway, Bristol	April 17	1:00 PM
9	Toyota Owners 400	Richmond International Raceway, Richmond	April 24	1:00 PM
10	GEICO 500	Talladega Superspeedway, Lincoln	May 1	1:00 PM
11	Go Bowling 400	Kansas Speedway, Kansas City	May 7	7:30 PM
12	AAA 400 Drive for Autism	Dover International Speedway, Dover	May 15	1:00 PM
	Sprint Showdown	Charlotte Motor Speedway, Concord	May 21^{1}	11:00 AM
	NASCAR Sprint All-Star Race	Charlotte Motor Speedway, Concord	May 21	9:00 PM
13	Coca-Cola 600	Charlotte Motor Speedway, Concord	May 29	6:00 PM
14	Axalta "We Paint Winners" 400	Pocono Raceway, Long Pond	June 6^{2}	12:00 PM
15	FireKeepers Casino 400	Michigan International Speedway, Brooklyn	June 12	1:00 PM
16	Toyota/Save Mart 350	Sonoma Raceway, Sonoma	June 26	3:00 PM
17	Coke Zero 400	Daytona International Speedway, Daytona Beach	July 2	7:45 PM
18	Quaker State 400	Kentucky Speedway, Sparta	July 9	7:30 PM
19	New Hampshire 301	New Hampshire Motor Speedway, Loudon	July 17	1:00 PM
20	Crown Royal presents the Combat Wounded Coalition 400 at the Brickyard	Indianapolis Motor Speedway, Speedway	July 24	3:00 PM
21	Pennsylvania 400	Pocono Raceway, Long Pond	August 1^{3}	12:00 PM
22	Cheez-It 355 at The Glen	Watkins Glen International, Watkins Glen	August 7	2:30 PM
23	Bass Pro Shops NRA Night Race	Bristol Motor Speedway, Bristol	August 20/21^{4}	8:00 PM
24	Pure Michigan 400	Michigan International Speedway, Brooklyn	August 28	2:30 PM
25	Bojangles' Southern 500	Darlington Raceway, Darlington	September 4	6:00 PM
26	Federated Auto Parts 400	Richmond International Raceway, Richmond	September 10	7:30 PM
Chase for the Sprint Cup
Round of 16
27	Teenage Mutant Ninja Turtles 400	Chicagoland Speedway, Joliet	September 18	2:30 PM
28	Bad Boy Off Road 300	New Hampshire Motor Speedway, Loudon	September 25	2:00 PM
29	Citizen Soldier 400	Dover International Speedway, Dover	October 2	2:00 PM
Round of 12
30	Bank of America 500	Charlotte Motor Speedway, Concord	October 9^{5}	12:00 PM
31	Hollywood Casino 400	Kansas Speedway, Kansas City	October 16	2:15 PM
32	Hellmann's 500	Talladega Superspeedway, Lincoln	October 23	2:00 PM
Round of 8
33	Goody's Fast Relief 500	Martinsville Speedway, Ridgeway	October 30	1:00 PM
34	AAA Texas 500	Texas Motor Speedway, Fort Worth	November 6	2:00 PM
35	Can-Am 500	Phoenix International Raceway, Avondale	November 13	2:30 PM
Championship 4
36	Ford EcoBoost 400	Homestead-Miami Speedway, Homestead	November 20	2:30 PM

== Season summary ==
=== Race reports ===
Speedweeks 2016

Speedweeks 2016 started with the Sprint Unlimited. Denny Hamlin led the most laps and won his third career Sprint Unlimited, followed by Joey Logano, Paul Menard, Kyle Larson, and Casey Mears. The race saw several multicar crashes, including one that sent the race into overtime. During the overtime period, a clean restart occurred before another multicar crash caused the race to end under yellow.

Top-10 results:

1. #11 - Denny Hamlin
2. #22 - Joey Logano
3. #27 - Paul Menard
4. #42 - Kyle Larson
5. #13 - Casey Mears
6. #17 - Ricky Stenhouse Jr.
7. #41 - Kurt Busch
8. #3 - Austin Dillon
9. #2 - Brad Keselowski
10. #16 - Greg Biffle

Qualifying for the front row of the Daytona 500 took place the following day. Rookie Chase Elliott won the pole, becoming the youngest Daytona 500 pole winner ever at the age of 20 years, 2 months, and 17 days. Matt Kenseth joined Elliott on the front row by qualifying second.

The following Thursday, the Can-Am Duels took place to set the remainder of the starting lineup for the Daytona 500. Dale Earnhardt Jr. led the most laps and won the first duel race. The second duel race was won by Kyle Busch ahead of a last-lap crash that involved multiple drivers including Jimmie Johnson, Martin Truex Jr., and polesitter Kenseth.

Top-10 results (Duel 1):

1. #88 - Dale Earnhardt Jr.
2. #22 - Joey Logano
3. #21 - Ryan Blaney
4. #4 - Kevin Harvick
5. #11 - Denny Hamlin
6. #24 - Chase Elliott
7. #5 - Kasey Kahne
8. #16 - Greg Biffle
9. #34 - Chris Buescher
10. #17 - Ricky Stenhouse Jr.

Top-10 results (Duel 2):

1. #18 - Kyle Busch
2. #1 - Jamie McMurray
3. #41 - Kurt Busch
4. #19 - Carl Edwards
5. #95 - Ty Dillon
6. #42 - Kyle Larson
7. #10 - Danica Patrick
8. #14 - Brian Vickers
9. #93 - Matt DiBenedetto
10. #46 - Michael Annett

Round 1 - Daytona International Speedway: Daytona 500

Elliott started on pole, but was taken out of contention by an early spin through the grass that destroyed the front end of his car. Several other small wrecks occurred throughout the race including a spin by Brian Vickers that caused Trevor Bayne and Carl Edwards to make contact, a single-car wreck that sent Earnhardt into the wall, and a wreck between Danica Patrick and Greg Biffle, but the big crash that the event usually sees was never triggered in the race. Denny Hamlin led the most laps, with the four Joe Gibbs Racing drivers and Truex Jr. up front for most of the race. On the last lap, Hamlin passed Kenseth for the lead and beat Truex Jr. to the line in a photo-finish, which was the closest margin in Daytona 500 history.

Top-10 results:

1. #11 - Denny Hamlin
2. #78 - Martin Truex Jr.
3. #18 - Kyle Busch
4. #4 - Kevin Harvick
5. #19 - Carl Edwards
6. #22 - Joey Logano
7. #42 - Kyle Larson
8. #7 - Regan Smith
9. #3 - Austin Dillon
10. #41 - Kurt Busch

Round 2 - Atlanta: Folds of Honor QuikTrip 500

Kurt Busch started on pole after his younger brother Kyle Busch's pole-winning qualifying time was disallowed, resulting in him starting in the rear. The race used the new low downforce package and saw few caution flags. Kenseth led several laps but went two laps down after a miscommunication following a pit road penalty. Kevin Harvick led the most laps but Johnson took the lead after pitting early during the final round of green-flag pit stops. After a cut tire from Ryan Newman sent the race into overtime, Johnson would win the race under caution after a multicar wreck involving Aric Almirola and 3 others occurred following a clean restart. The win was the 76th career win for Johnson, tying Dale Earnhardt.

Top-10 results:

1. #48 - Jimmie Johnson
2. #88 - Dale Earnhardt Jr.
3. #18 - Kyle Busch
4. #41 - Kurt Busch
5. #19 - Carl Edwards
6. #4 - Kevin Harvick
7. #78 - Martin Truex Jr.
8. #24 - Chase Elliott
9. #2 - Brad Keselowski
10. #17 - Ricky Stenhouse Jr.

Round 3 - Las Vegas: Kobalt 400

Kurt Busch led the field to green after a brief delay due to rain showers. The race was plagued by high winds, with a sandstorm hitting the track at one point from laps 202–205. Jimmie Johnson led the most laps in the race. A few wrecks occurred including one involving Regan Smith and Kyle Larson and a multicar wreck that took Matt Kenseth and Chase Elliott out of contention. Kyle Busch had the lead in the closing laps, but was passed by Brad Keselowski, who went on to win the race. Keselowski was followed by Joey Logano, Johnson, Kyle Busch, and Austin Dillon.

Top-10 results:

1. #2 - Brad Keselowski
2. #22 - Joey Logano
3. #48 - Jimmie Johnson
4. #18 - Kyle Busch
5. #3 - Austin Dillon
6. #21 - Ryan Blaney
7. #4 - Kevin Harvick
8. #88 - Dale Earnhardt Jr.
9. #41 - Kurt Busch
10. #5 - Kasey Kahne

Round 4 - Phoenix: Good Sam 500

Kyle Busch started from the pole and led the early part of the race. Dale Earnhardt Jr., Carl Edwards, and Kevin Harvick also led throughout the race, with Harvick leading the most laps. The race saw several drivers have tire issues from melted tire beads including Ryan Newman, Paul Menard, Ricky Stenhouse Jr., Brad Keselowski, and Kasey Kahne. Kahne's crash into the wall sent the race into overtime, where Harvick beat Edwards in a photo-finish, followed by Denny Hamlin, Kyle Busch, and Earnhardt Jr. Harvick won his 8th career race at Phoenix.

Top-10 results:

1. #4 - Kevin Harvick
2. #19 - Carl Edwards
3. #11 - Denny Hamlin
4. #18 - Kyle Busch
5. #88 - Dale Earnhardt Jr.
6. #41 - Kurt Busch
7. #20 - Matt Kenseth
8. #24 - Chase Elliott
9. #3 - Austin Dillon
10. #21 - Ryan Blaney

Round 5 - Fontana: Auto Club 400

Austin Dillon started the race from the pole. A number of drivers had tire issues throughout the race, including Kyle Larson, who crashed into the inside wall hard. Another incident occurred with Kasey Kahne and Danica Patrick got together, sending Patrick into the wall. Kevin Harvick led the most laps in the race. The race went into overtime after Kyle Busch got into the wall from a blown tire. In the overtime finish, Jimmie Johnson scored his 77th career win, ahead of Harvick, Denny Hamlin, Joey Logano, and Ricky Stenhouse Jr.

Top-10 results:

1. #48 - Jimmie Johnson
2. #4 - Kevin Harvick
3. #11 - Denny Hamlin
4. #22 - Joey Logano
5. #17 - Ricky Stenhouse Jr.
6. #24 - Chase Elliott
7. #19 - Carl Edwards
8. #47 - A. J. Allmendinger
9. #2 - Brad Keselowski
10. #1 - Jamie McMurray

Round 6 - Martinsville: STP 500

Joey Logano started on the pole and led early before fading. A few incidents occurred during the race including an early spin by Dale Earnhardt Jr. and Denny Hamlin getting into the wall. Kyle Busch led the most laps and went on to win the race, his first career win at Martinsville and completing the weekend sweep as he won the Camping World Truck Series race the day before. Kyle Busch was followed by A. J. Allmendinger, Kyle Larson, Austin Dillon, and Brad Keselowski.

Top-10 results:

1. #18 - Kyle Busch
2. #47 - A. J. Allmendinger
3. #42 - Kyle Larson
4. #3 - Austin Dillon
5. #2 - Brad Keselowski
6. #19 - Carl Edwards
7. #14 - Brian Vickers
8. #27 - Paul Menard
9. #48 - Jimmie Johnson
10. #31 - Ryan Newman

Round 7 - Texas: Duck Commander 500

Carl Edwards led the field to green after a two-hour delay from rain. Martin Truex Jr. led the most laps in the race. Late in the race, a 13-car wreck occurred when Austin Dillon spun and caused a chain reaction that collected several drivers including Paul Menard, Ryan Newman, Trevor Bayne, Brian Vickers, and Brian Scott. During the final caution, Truex Jr. stayed out while several other drivers came to pit road for fresh tires. On the restart, Kyle Busch was able to get around Truex Jr. and win the race, his second straight Cup win and second consecutive weekend sweep as he won the Xfinity Series race the night before. Kyle Busch was followed across the finish line by Dale Earnhardt Jr., Joey Logano, Jimmie Johnson, and Chase Elliott.

Top-10 results:

1. #18 - Kyle Busch
2. #88 - Dale Earnhardt Jr.
3. #22 - Joey Logano
4. #48 - Jimmie Johnson
5. #24 - Chase Elliott
6. #78 - Martin Truex Jr.
7. #19 - Carl Edwards
8. #5 - Kasey Kahne
9. #41 - Kurt Busch
10. #4 - Kevin Harvick

Round 8 - Bristol: Food City 500

Carl Edwards started the race from pole position as Dale Earnhardt Jr. went two laps down early after not being able to get going at the initial start. Matt Kenseth led several laps in the early part of the race. Kyle Busch experienced tire issues, a spin, and pit-road speeding penalties before a cut right-front tire sent him hard into the wall a little past halfway, ending his race. Kenseth also had a right-front tire issue that sent him into the wall and knocked him out of contention. Kyle Larson experienced a broken track bar that left him multiple laps down. Denny Hamlin and Aric Almirola both got into the wall late in the race in separate crashes. Edwards would go on to lead the most laps and win the race, his first of the season. Edwards was followed by Earnhardt Jr. (who rebounded from his early issues), Kurt Busch, Chase Elliott, and Trevor Bayne. BK Racing driver Matt DiBenedetto recorded a career best finish of 6th.

Top-10 results:

1. #19 - Carl Edwards
2. #88 - Dale Earnhardt Jr.
3. #41 - Kurt Busch
4. #24 - Chase Elliott
5. #6 - Trevor Bayne
6. #83 - Matt DiBenedetto
7. #4 - Kevin Harvick
8. #15 - Clint Bowyer
9. #31 - Ryan Newman
10. #22 - Joey Logano

Round 9 - Richmond: Toyota Owners 400

Kevin Harvick started from pole after qualifying was rained out and the field was set by practice speeds. The race saw long green-flag runs in the early part of the race. Several drivers rotated the lead throughout the race, including Harvick, Jimmie Johnson, Carl Edwards, Kyle Busch, and Kurt Busch. In the later part of the race, a few incidents occurred including a cut tire from Tony Stewart, who made his first start of the season after missing the first eight races due to an offseason back injury, and a wreck from Brian Scott. In the closing laps, Kyle Busch held the lead with Edwards close behind. On the final lap, Edwards did a "bump and run" move to take the lead from Kyle Busch and score his second straight win. Kyle Busch finished second, followed by Johnson, Kasey Kahne, and Harvick.

Top-10 results:

1. #19 - Carl Edwards
2. #18 - Kyle Busch
3. #48 - Jimmie Johnson
4. #5 - Kasey Kahne
5. #4 - Kevin Harvick
6. #11 - Denny Hamlin
7. #20 - Matt Kenseth
8. #22 - Joey Logano
9. #78 - Martin Truex Jr.
10. #41 - Kurt Busch

Round 10 - Talladega: GEICO 500

Chase Elliott was on pole position for the race. The race was threatened by rain and featured intense racing and numerous multicar wrecks. Early in the race, Dale Earnhardt Jr. got loose and collected Kasey Kahne. Under this caution, Ty Dillon relieved Tony Stewart, who made his second start of the season since returning from a back injury. Near the middle of the race, a 7-car wreck occurred that saw Chris Buescher flip multiple times. Carl Edwards got into Earnhardt Jr., causing serious damage to both cars. Kahne would also be involved in a second wreck. Toward the later part of the race, several crashes occurred, including "The Big One", which involved 21 cars, and a hard wreck involving Danica Patrick and Matt Kenseth that saw Kenseth go airborne and ride along the infield wall upside down. Brad Keselowski won the race as a multicar wreck occurred coming to the checkered flag that involved Kevin Harvick and Ricky Stenhouse Jr., among others.

Top-10 results:

1. #2 - Brad Keselowski
2. #18 - Kyle Busch
3. #3 - Austin Dillon
4. #1 - Jamie McMurray
5. #24 - Chase Elliott
6. #14 - Tony Stewart
7. #15 - Clint Bowyer
8. #41 - Kurt Busch
9. #21 - Ryan Blaney
10. #6 - Trevor Bayne

Round 11 - Kansas: Go Bowling 400

Martin Truex Jr. started on pole and dominated the race, leading 172 laps. However, a loose wheel following a green-flag pit stop took him out of contention for the win. Late in the race, Denny Hamlin, Joey Logano, Brad Keselowski, and Kyle Larson were involved in a wreck battling for position near the front of the field. Under this caution, Kyle Busch stayed out while other drivers came to pit road for fresh tires. In the closing laps, Kyle Busch was able to hold off Kevin Harvick on older tires and win the race, his third win of the season and first career win at Kansas. Harvick finished second, followed by Kurt Busch, Matt Kenseth, and Ryan Blaney.

Top-10 results:

1. #18 - Kyle Busch
2. #4 - Kevin Harvick
3. #41 - Kurt Busch
4. #20 - Matt Kenseth
5. #21 - Ryan Blaney
6. #3 - Austin Dillon
7. #31 - Ryan Newman
8. #47 - A. J. Allmendinger
9. #24 - Chase Elliott
10. #2 - Brad Keselowski

Round 12 - Dover: AAA 400 Drive for Autism

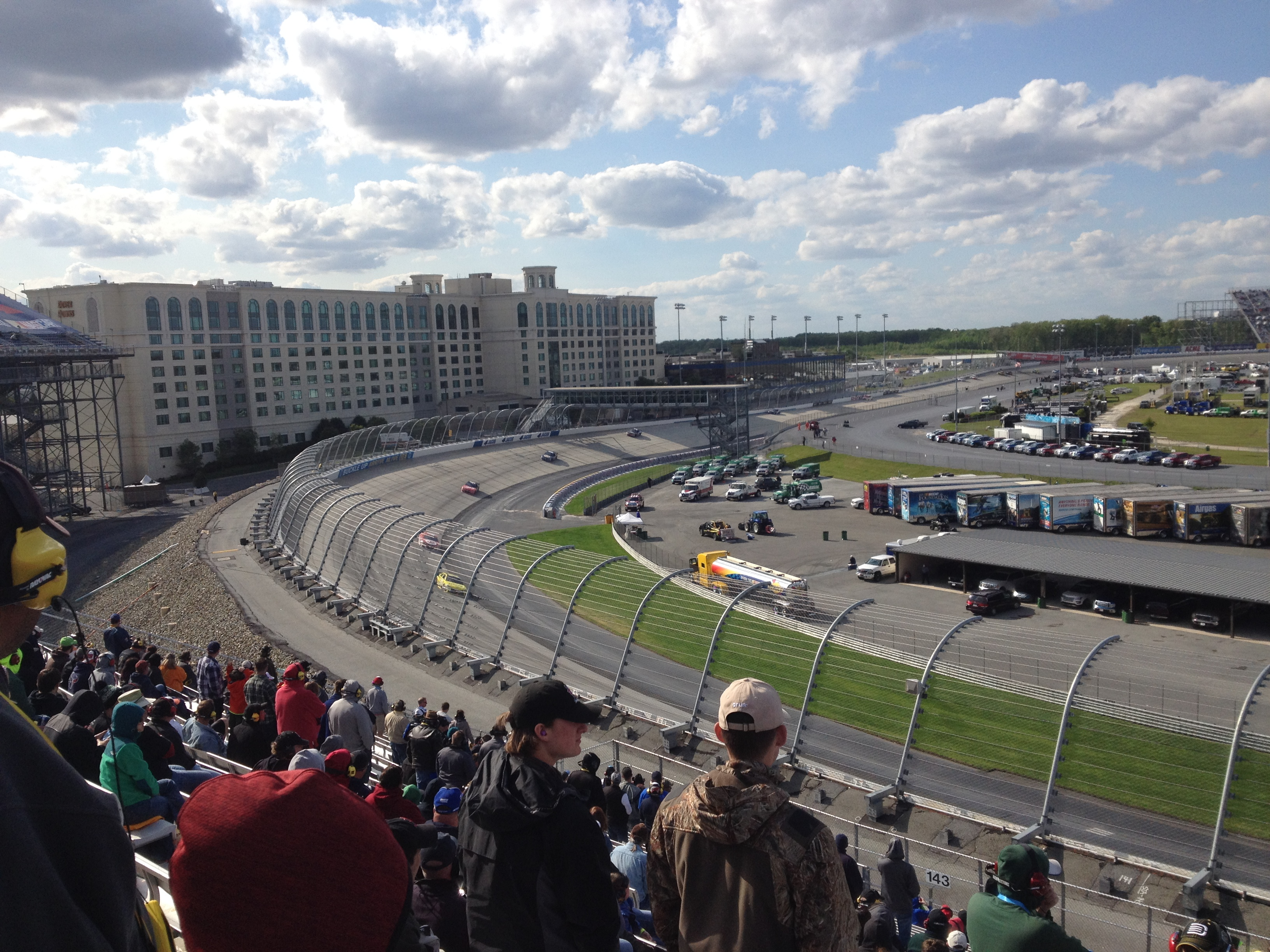
Matt Kenseth leads the AAA 400 Drive for Autism at Dover International Speedway in May, a race he wins.

Kevin Harvick won the pole after qualifying was rained out and the starting order was set by first practice speeds. Harvick led before and after the competition caution on lap 40. Others such as Kyle Larson and Martin Truex Jr. led during the race. Early in the race, several single-car wrecks occurred that involved drivers including Matt DiBenedetto, Austin Dillon, and Michael Annett. The race was nerve rattling towards the end. Brad Keselowski ran into the lapped car of Austin Dillon while leading, cutting down his tire. Tony Stewart broke a track bar and spilled rear end grease on the track. On a restart with 46 laps to go, leader Jimmie Johnson could not get going and bunched up the field, causing a large wreck which involved 18 cars. Carl Edwards crashed into the inside wall on the following restart. The race restarted again with 35 laps to go and the end came down to a battle between Matt Kenseth and Kyle Larson. Larson came close numerous times to get the lead, but Kenseth put the block on Larson and won his first race of the season.

Top-10 results:

1. #20 - Matt Kenseth
2. #42 - Kyle Larson
3. #24 - Chase Elliott
4. #5 - Kasey Kahne
5. #41 - Kurt Busch
6. #2 - Brad Keselowski
7. #11 - Denny Hamlin
8. #21 - Ryan Blaney
9. #78 - Martin Truex Jr.
10. #6 - Trevor Bayne

Exhibition - Charlotte: NASCAR Sprint All-Star Race

In the Sprint Showdown, which was postponed from Friday evening to Saturday morning due to rain, Ryan Blaney was black flagged for jumping a restart near the end of the first 20-lap segment, allowing Trevor Bayne and Chase Elliott to battle to the finish, with Bayne edging Elliott at the line to advance to the All-Star race. Austin Dillon started off leading the second 20-lap segment, but Greg Biffle took the lead five laps in and pulled away from the field to win and advance. Kyle Larson led the final 10-lap segment and battled with Chase Elliott before edging out Elliott to win and advance. Elliott and Danica Patrick finished first and second in the Fan Vote to advance, bringing the field up to 20 cars.

Top-10 results (Showdown):

1. #42 - Kyle Larson
2. #16 - Greg Biffle
3. #6 - Trevor Bayne
4. #24 - Chase Elliott
5. #21 - Ryan Blaney
6. #43 - Aric Almirola
7. #47 - A. J. Allmendinger
8. #38 - Landon Cassill
9. #15 - Clint Bowyer
10. #13 - Casey Mears

Kevin Harvick won the pole for the All-Star Race after the field was set by owner points due to qualifying being rained out. Harvick led much of the first 50-lap segment but gave up the lead to make the required green-flag pit stop. Everyone made the stop except Matt Kenseth, who was leading when Jamie McMurray spun out with five laps left in the segment and was unable to make his stop. He was penalized one lap for failing to stop, creating a scoring confusion that occurred when NASCAR allowed cars trapped one lap down by Kenseth, who were now on the tail-end of the lead lap, to pit in front of new leader Carl Edwards. Some of those cars came off pit road behind the leaders, one lap down, and were originally scored on the lead lap. However, the issue was corrected and those cars were sent to the rear. Brad Keselowski lead to green on the start of the second 50-lap second, which required a green-flag pit stop before lap 85 (lap 35 of segment 2). A few laps into the segment, a caution came out for water in turn two, and Kevin Harvick made several pit stops due to what appeared to be fuel pump problems. When the race restarted, Chase Elliott attempted to make his required pit stop, causing Matt Kenseth to slow up and get turned into the wall, collecting Tony Stewart and Kasey Kahne. Greg Biffle's car was also damaged after clipping Elliott's right rear. After the restart, everyone else made the required green-flag stops, and Kyle Busch, who assumed the lead after pit stops, received a speeding penalty and dropped to 13th. Keselowski assumed the lead, but lost it to Kyle Larson took the lead from Keselowski, who won the second segment. A random draw of 9, 10, or 11 at the end of the segment determined that the top 11 cars had to pit for four tires. This gave the lead to 12th-place Jimmie Johnson for the final segment, with Kyle Busch lining up alongside. On the restart for the final segment, Kyle Larson took the lead back from Johnson and began to pull away from the field, but was caught by Joey Logano. Larson and Logano ran side by side until the two made contact sending Larson into the wall. Logano continued on to win ahead of teammate Brad Keselowski.

Top-10 results:

1. #22 - Joey Logano
2. #2 - Brad Keselowski
3. #88 - Dale Earnhardt Jr.
4. #19 - Carl Edwards
5. #41 - Kurt Busch
6. #24 - Chase Elliott
7. #6 - Trevor Bayne
8. #16 - Greg Biffle
9. #11 - Denny Hamlin
10. #75 - Kyle Busch

Round 13 - Charlotte: Coca-Cola 600

Martin Truex Jr. started the race from the pole. Truex dominated, leading 392 of 400 laps. A few incidents happened during the race including a cut tire from Kasey Kahne early in the race, a pit-road penalty for Joey Logano, and a cut tire that sent Kyle Busch into the wall late in the race. Truex won the race to set the record for most laps led in a race at Charlotte and most miles led in a NASCAR race by leading for 588 miles. Truex was followed across the finish line by Kevin Harvick, Jimmie Johnson, Denny Hamlin, and Brad Keselowski.

Top-10 results:

1. #78 - Martin Truex Jr.
2. #4 - Kevin Harvick
3. #48 - Jimmie Johnson
4. #11 - Denny Hamlin
5. #2 - Brad Keselowski
6. #41 - Kurt Busch
7. #20 - Matt Kenseth
8. #24 - Chase Elliott
9. #22 - Joey Logano
10. #31 - Ryan Newman

Round 14 - Pocono: Axalta "We Paint Winners" 400

Brad Keselowski won the pole for the race. The race was postponed from Sunday afternoon to Monday afternoon due to persistent rain. Joey Logano got a jump on teammate Keselowski on the start and led early. A competition caution for rain from the day before. Matt Kenseth got the lead off of pit road and led until Chase Elliott got by on a restart after Kenseth and Kyle Busch battled for the lead. Elliott dominated the race and was able to pull away from the field on the next several restarts. Tony Stewart got loose in turn two and crashed into Danica Patrick. Michael Annett also hit the wall hard in turn two. At one point, Kyle Busch hit the wall and had to go to the garage; on the pit stops under that caution, teams executed differing pit strategies, allowing Martin Truex Jr. to get the lead off pit road. However, Truex's right-rear tire went down, and he had to return to the pits. On the restart, Jimmie Johnson got loose and crashed into the wall, sending him to the garage. On the restart, Kurt Busch got the lead from Dale Earnhardt Jr. and pulled away from Earnhardt while saving fuel to win the race for his third career win at Pocono, ahead of Earnhardt, Keselowski, Elliott, and Logano.

Top-10 results:

1. #41 - Kurt Busch
2. #88 - Dale Earnhardt Jr.
3. #2 - Brad Keselowski
4. #24 - Chase Elliott
5. #22 - Joey Logano
6. #5 - Kasey Kahne
7. #20 - Matt Kenseth
8. #19 - Carl Edwards
9. #4 - Kevin Harvick
10. #21 - Ryan Blaney
- This was Dale Earnhardt Jr's last second place finish.

Round 15 - Michigan: FireKeepers Casino 400

Joey Logano won the pole for the race. Logano, who has not scored a win this season, dominated the race leading 139 laps. Chase Elliott led for the second week in a row and led a bunch of laps, but fell back after failing on a restart. There were 8 cautions during the race including Martin Truex Jr. spinning after contact with Clint Bowyer, Kyle Busch blowing an engine and hitting the wall, Dale Earnhardt Jr. hit the wall and crashed along with A. J. Allmendinger, and Denny Hamlin hitting the wall hard after blowing a tire. Logano pulled away from the field on the final restart and held off Chase Elliott, who almost did not have enough fuel to make it to the end, to score his first win of 2016 and second at Michigan.

Top-10 results:

1. #22 - Joey Logano
2. #24 - Chase Elliott
3. #42 - Kyle Larson
4. #2 - Brad Keselowski
5. #4 - Kevin Harvick
6. #19 - Carl Edwards
7. #14 - Tony Stewart
8. #3 - Austin Dillon
9. #1 - Jamie McMurray
10. #41 - Kurt Busch

Round 16 - Sonoma: Toyota/Save Mart 350

Carl Edwards started the race from pole position. Early in the race, Clint Bowyer suffered an electrical fire in his car that sent him to the garage. Denny Hamlin led the most laps in the race. Late in the race, Tony Stewart made a green-flag pit stop right before a caution came out for debris. The rest of the field came to pit road under the caution while Stewart stayed out and inherited the lead. On the last lap, Hamlin passed Stewart for the lead in turn 7, but Stewart was able to regain the lead from Hamlin in the final turn and win the race, his first win of the season, first since 2013 and the final win of his career. With this win, Stewart pulled within nine points from making the top 30 in order to be eligible for the Chase.

Top-10 results:

1. #14 - Tony Stewart
2. #11 - Denny Hamlin
3. #22 - Joey Logano
4. #19 - Carl Edwards
5. #78 - Martin Truex Jr.
6. #4 - Kevin Harvick
7. #18 - Kyle Busch
8. #31 - Ryan Newman
9. #5 - Kasey Kahne
10. #41 - Kurt Busch

Round 17 - Daytona: Coke Zero 400

Greg Biffle won the pole for the race. The first half of the race was calm. On lap 90, "The Big One" occurred when teammates Jamie McMurray and Kyle Larson got together, sending McMurray into Jimmie Johnson and it involved 19 other cars including Brian Scott's car coming to rest on top of Kevin Harvick's car. Brad Keselowski dominated, leading 115 laps. Late in the race, Tony Stewart wrecked and collected Carl Edwards and Casey Mears. Edwards would again be involved in a wreck with 5 laps to go that sent the race into overtime. Keselowski held off Kyle Busch to win for his first victory at Daytona as Kurt Busch went for a slide through the infield grass after getting tapped by Joey Logano.

Top-10 results:

1. #2 - Brad Keselowski
2. #18 - Kyle Busch
3. #6 - Trevor Bayne
4. #22 - Joey Logano
5. #17 - Ricky Stenhouse Jr.
6. #42 - Kyle Larson
7. #3 - Austin Dillon
8. #16 - Greg Biffle
9. #15 - Clint Bowyer
10. #95 - Michael McDowell

Round 18 - Kentucky: Quaker State 400

Kevin Harvick won the pole after the field was set by owner points due to qualifying being rained out. Harvick dominated the race and led the most laps. The repaved track proved to be a problem for multiple drivers. Jimmie Johnson spun and hit the wall, taking him to the garage. Joey Logano blew a tire and smacked the wall, ending his day early. Rookies Chase Elliott and Ryan Blaney crashed out of the race together. A big wreck happened, involving 8 cars. A. J. Allmendinger hit the wall and destroyed the front end of his car. Multiple drivers tried to make it to the end on fuel. Brad Keselowski led the final 65 laps and saved enough fuel to hold off Carl Edwards to get his fourth win of the season and third at Kentucky.

Top-10 results:

1. #2 - Brad Keselowski
2. #19 - Carl Edwards
3. #31 - Ryan Newman
4. #41 - Kurt Busch
5. #14 - Tony Stewart
6. #16 - Greg Biffle
7. #1 - Jamie McMurray
8. #20 - Matt Kenseth
9. #4 - Kevin Harvick
10. #78 - Martin Truex Jr.

Round 19 - Loudon: New Hampshire 301

Jimmie Johnson won the pole. Kyle Busch took the lead from Johnson at the start. Busch led until lap 87 when Martin Truex Jr. took over the top spot. Truex led until lap 172 when Kyle Busch retook the lead. Busch led until Truex won the race off of pit road during a caution for debris. Matt Kenseth took the lead from Truex in lap 257. The caution came out for debris in turn three and Denny Hamlin stayed on the track as Kenseth kept the lead coming off pit road. Truex reported to his team that he was stuck in fourth gear and fell back on the restart. Kenseth took the lead from Hamlin and then a caution came out for Alex Bowman, who was filling in for Dale Earnhardt Jr., cut a tire down. Kenseth continued to lead off the restart until Kurt Busch cut a tire, bringing out the caution. Kenseth led off at restart until Kyle Larson brought the caution out after sliding through the grass. Kenseth continued to lead off the restart and was able to hold off Tony Stewart to get his second win of the season.

Top-10 results:

1. #20 - Matt Kenseth
2. #14 - Tony Stewart
3. #22 - Joey Logano
4. #4 - Kevin Harvick
5. #16 - Greg Biffle
6. #1 - Jamie McMurray
7. #31 - Ryan Newman
8. #18 - Kyle Busch
9. #11 - Denny Hamlin
10. #17 - Ricky Stenhouse Jr.

Round 20 - Indianapolis: Crown Royal presents the Combat Wounded Coalition 400 at the Brickyard

Defending race winner Kyle Busch started on pole. Busch led most of the race. Several accidents took place during the race. Matt DiBenedetto blew his engine on lap 3. After three straight top 10 finishes since July 2, Greg Biffle smacked the wall on lap 52 and knocked himself out of the race. During that caution, Joey Logano stayed out and led the field back to green. Kyle Busch retook the lead on lap 63 and continued leading, other than temporary changes during pit stop cycling. A caution came out with 7 laps to go. On the restart, Carl Edwards and Ryan Newman made contact and wrecked with Brad Keselowski and Ryan Blaney. The red flag was displayed to clean up the track. On the restart, Trevor Bayne and Clint Bowyer made contact. On the following restart, which took place in overtime, Jamie McMurray spun into Austin Dillon and Brian Scott also spun. On the second restart of overtime, Kyle Busch pulled away from teammate Matt Kenseth to win his second consecutive Sprint Cup Brickyard event and sweeping the weekend for the second year in a row. This was Busch's fourth win of 2016. Competing in his final Sprint Cup Brickyard event, Tony Stewart came home eleventh and Jeff Gordon, who came out of retirement to fill in for Dale Earnhardt Jr., finished thirteenth.

Top-10 results:

1. #18 - Kyle Busch
2. #20 - Matt Kenseth
3. #48 - Jimmie Johnson
4. #11 - Denny Hamlin
5. #42 - Kyle Larson
6. #4 - Kevin Harvick
7. #22 - Joey Logano
8. #78 - Martin Truex Jr.
9. #3 - Austin Dillon
10. #27 - Paul Menard

Round 21 - Pocono: Pennsylvania 400

Martin Truex Jr. won the pole. The race was scheduled for Sunday but was postponed to Monday due to rain. Truex led early until he had a right-front tire go down. Logano dominated the early part of the race. Austin Dillon and Kyle Larson was battling for the lead as rain was approaching the track. The two got together allowing Logano to regain the lead. After a restart, Chase Elliott got loose and spun and ran into Logano, ending both drivers' chances for a win. Pit strategy allowed Larson and Dillon to get back out front. Chris Buescher was in the lead trying to win the race as fog and rain hit the track. The red flag was displayed as fog continued to come and thicken. During the fog delay, rain moved into the area causing the cars to be covered. After a long red flag display, the race was called official and Buescher got his first career victory and the first for Front Row Motorsports since the 2013 Aaron's 499.

Top-10 results:

1. #34 - Chris Buescher
2. #2 - Brad Keselowski
3. #7 - Regan Smith
4. #4 - Kevin Harvick
5. #14 - Tony Stewart
6. #42 - Kyle Larson
7. #11 - Denny Hamlin
8. #19 - Carl Edwards
9. #18 - Kyle Busch
10. #41 - Kurt Busch

Round 22 - Watkins Glen: Cheez-It 355 at The Glen

Carl Edwards won the pole to sweep the road course poles. Brad Keselowski led the most laps in the race. Multiple drivers received penalties on pit road. There were a couple of big wrecks. On lap 53, Jimmie Johnson, Austin Dillon, Greg Biffle, and Ricky Stenhouse Jr. got into a big wreck that brought out the red flag. On the restart, there was another wreck involving Clint Bowyer, David Ragan, Alex Kennedy, and polesitter Edwards. Another wreck took place with seven laps to go as Kevin Harvick, Matt DiBenedetto, Chris Buescher, and David Ragan got together. The wreck brought out the red flag once again. On the restart, Denny Hamlin, despite back pain, held off Joey Logano after Martin Truex Jr. spun after making contact with Brad Keselowski to pick up his second win of the season and his first career victory on a road course. Jeff Gordon, still substituting for Dale Earnhardt Jr., made his 800th start.

Top-10 results:

1. #11 - Denny Hamlin
2. #22 - Joey Logano
3. #2 - Brad Keselowski
4. #47 - A. J. Allmendinger
5. #14 - Tony Stewart
6. #18 - Kyle Busch
7. #78 - Martin Truex Jr.
8. #1 - Jamie McMurray
9. #6 - Trevor Bayne
10. #20 - Matt Kenseth

Round 23 - Bristol: Bass Pro Shops NRA Night Race

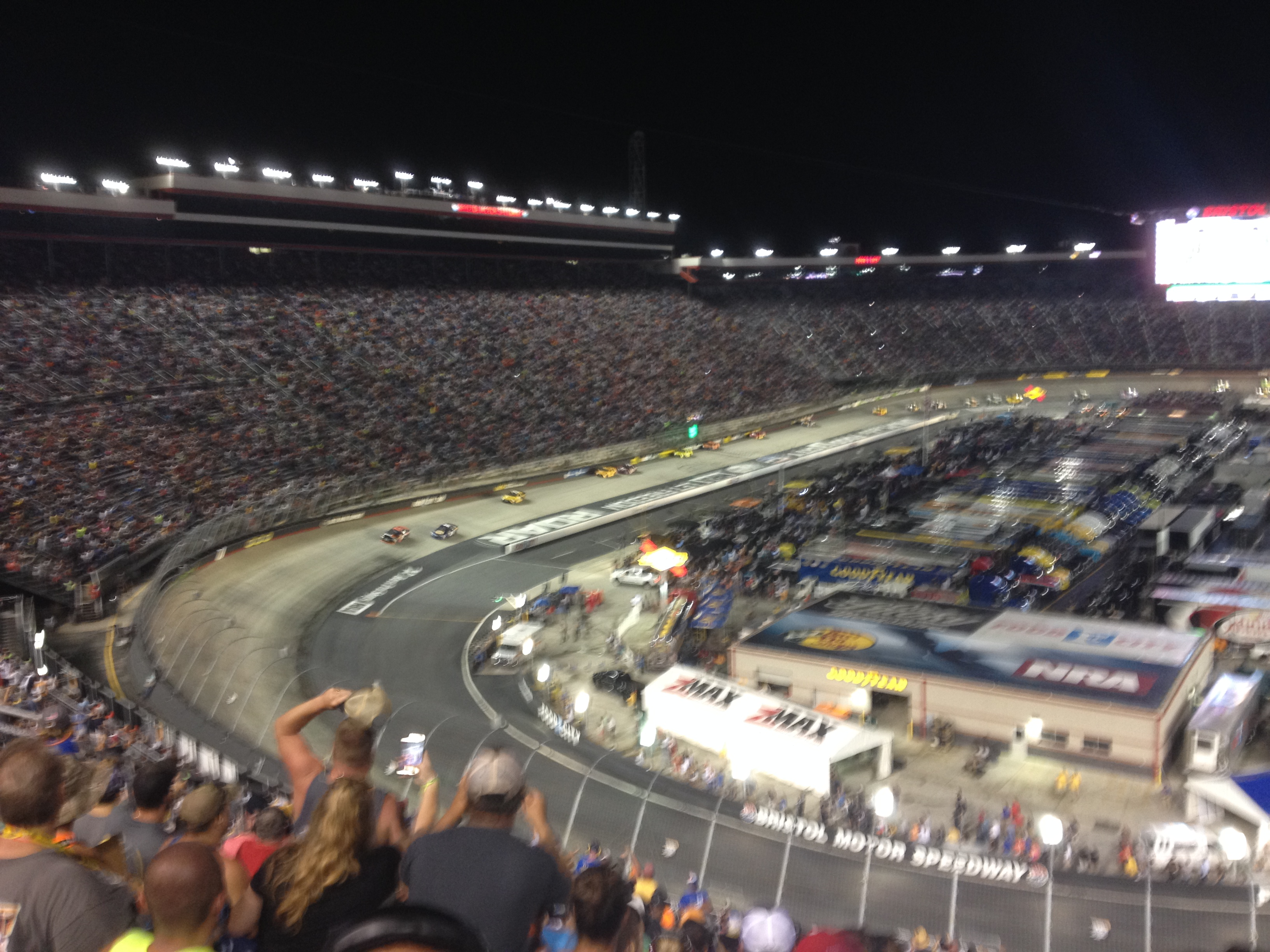
Denny Hamlin leads early in the Bass Pro Shops NRA Night Race at Bristol Motor Speedway in August.

Spring Bristol winner Carl Edwards started on pole with a new track record. Denny Hamlin took the lead from Edwards at the start. Hamlin led until Chase Elliott took the lead. Kyle Busch took the lead from Elliott and began to pull away from the field until the caution came out for rain. The race was red flagged until the track was dried and the field was brought out under caution. It began to rain again and the red flag was displayed. The race was then postponed until the following day in the afternoon. The race was delayed due early morning rain. The race would resume and Kyle Busch continued to lead. Busch led 256 laps, but was taken out of the race when he spun and Justin Allgaier ran into him. Kurt Busch and Brad Keselowski crashed and took out some of the field. Joey Logano, who won the last two summer Bristol races, lost the lead to Kevin Harvick and had to go to pit road to tape up the front end of his car. Denny Hamlin led off the restart and lost the lead to Harvick. It began to rain and field circled around the track under caution. Harvick pulled away from the field on the restart and held off Ricky Stenhouse Jr. to receive his second win of the season and his first at Bristol since 2005.

Top-10 results:

1. #4 - Kevin Harvick
2. #17 - Ricky Stenhouse Jr.
3. #11 - Denny Hamlin
4. #3 - Austin Dillon
5. #34 - Chris Buescher
6. #19 - Carl Edwards
7. #48 - Jimmie Johnson
8. #1 - Jamie McMurray
9. #47 - A. J. Allmendinger
10. #22 - Joey Logano

Round 24 - Michigan: Pure Michigan 400

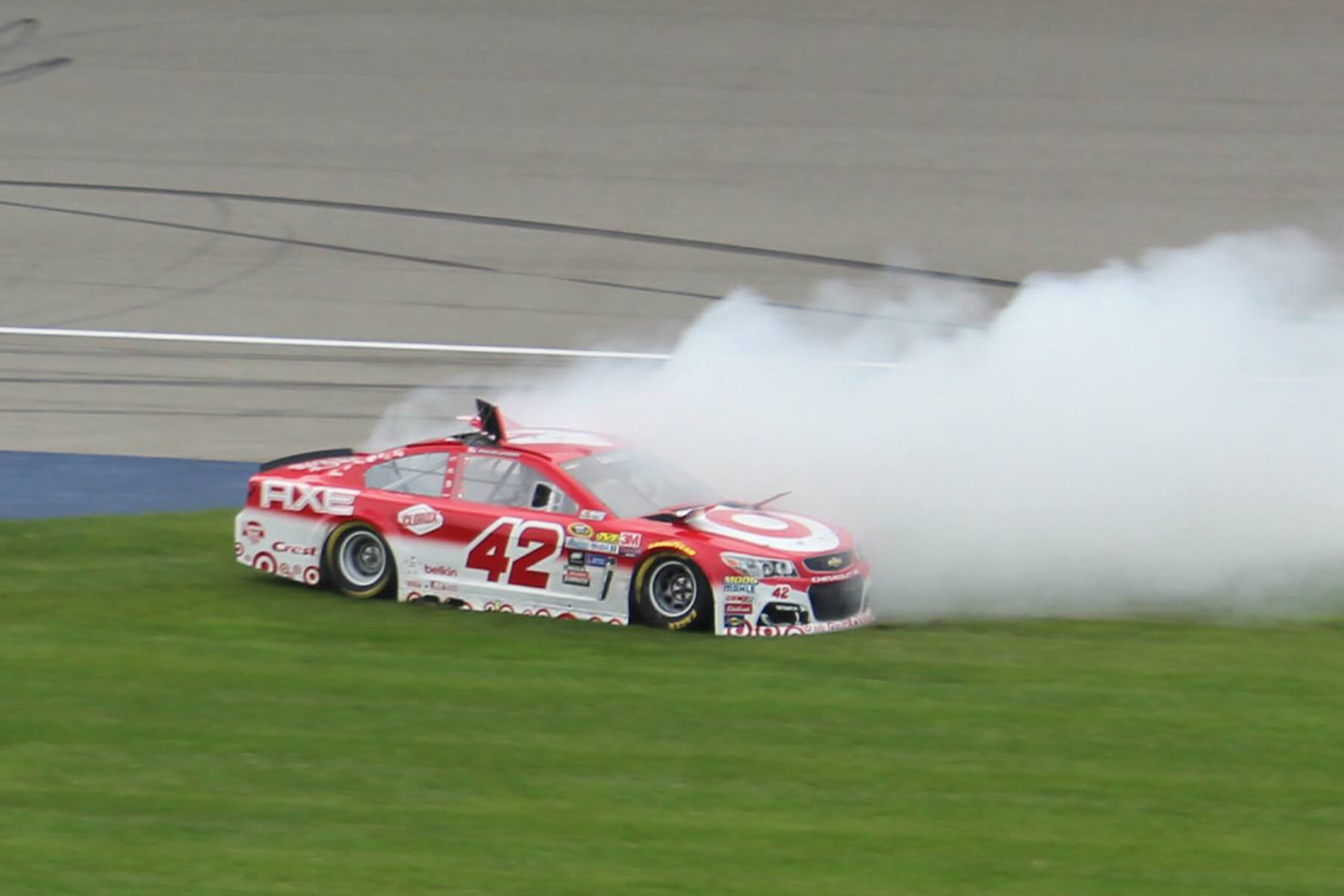
Kyle Larson pulls a burnout following his first career Cup win in the Pure Michigan 400 at Michigan International Speedway.

June Michigan winner Joey Logano started on pole. Chris Buescher had trouble early and fell four laps down. Logano led early, but fell back after the competition caution. Kevin Harvick got the lead and led until Martin Truex Jr. was able to take the lead when they came up on lapped traffic. Kyle Busch spun out into the grass early. Jimmie Johnson got the lead after green flag pit stops, but lost the lead on the next round of pit stops after his team took extra time to fill the car with fuel. Chase Elliott got the lead due to Johnson's misfortune. Kyle Larson was able to get the lead on a restart and pull away from the field as a rainstorm was nearing the track. Elliott was able to get off pit road ahead of Larson. On a restart, leader Elliott spun the tires and it allowed Larson to take the lead and pull away from the field and held off Elliott to get his first career Sprint Cup series win.

Top-10 results:

1. #42 - Kyle Larson
2. #24 - Chase Elliott
3. #2 - Brad Keselowski
4. #21 - Ryan Blaney
5. #4 - Kevin Harvick
6. #48 - Jimmie Johnson
7. #19 - Carl Edwards
8. #1 - Jamie McMurray
9. #11 - Denny Hamlin
10. #22 - Joey Logano

Round 25 - Darlington: Bojangles' Southern 500

Kevin Harvick won the pole due to qualifying being cancelled due to local rainfall from Tropical Storm Hermine. Harvick dominated the race, but had a few pit road problems, costing him a few positions. Kyle Larson, Brad Keselowski, Denny Hamlin, and Matt Kenseth also led during the race. Several accidents took place including Brian Scott getting into the wall after contact with Tony Stewart, Jimmie Johnson spun and hit the wall, Stewart blew his engine while running thirteenth, and Kurt Busch got into the wall after contact with Paul Menard. A few drivers such as Brad Keselowski and Ryan Newman had pit strategy. Newman was able to pull away from the field, trying to win to get into "The Chase". Martin Truex Jr. was able to get by Newman and pull away from the field. A caution came out for Aric Almirola crashing into the wall after contact with Clint Bowyer. On the restart, Truex Jr. pulled away from the field and held off Harvick for his second win of the season.

Top-10 results:

1. #78 - Martin Truex Jr.
2. #4 - Kevin Harvick
3. #42 - Kyle Larson
4. #11 - Denny Hamlin
5. #22 - Joey Logano
6. #20 - Matt Kenseth
7. #5 - Kasey Kahne
8. #31 - Ryan Newman
9. #2 - Brad Keselowski
10. #24 - Chase Elliott

Round 26 - Richmond: Federated Auto Parts 400

Denny Hamlin won the pole. The race was mostly dominated by Hamlin and Martin Truex Jr. Chase Elliott got into the wall after contact with Jeff Gordon. Jimmie Johnson made contact with the wall after he had a left-rear go down. A. J. Allmendinger spun three times during the race. A big wreck caused the red flag to be displayed involving Tony Stewart, Ryan Newman, Carl Edwards, and others when Stewart and Newman made contact. On the restart, Hamlin pulled away from the field until a caution came out with two laps to go when Regan Smith hit the wall. The race went into overtime with Kasey Kahne in position to get a win to make "The Chase." On the restart, Hamlin pulled away from the field to score his third win of the season and third at Richmond. Chris Buescher, Chase Elliott, Austin Dillon, and Jamie McMurray filled the remaining spots in "The Chase."

Top-10 results:

1. #11 - Denny Hamlin
2. #42 - Kyle Larson
3. #78 - Martin Truex Jr.
4. #2 - Brad Keselowski
5. #4 - Kevin Harvick
6. #5 - Kasey Kahne
7. #1 - Jamie McMurray
8. #41 - Kurt Busch
9. #18 - Kyle Busch
10. #22 - Joey Logano

Round 27 - Joliet: Teenage Mutant Ninja Turtles 400

Kyle Busch was awarded the pole after qualifying was rained out and the field was set by points. Busch was able to get the pole due to him being the first seed in "The Chase." At the start of the race, Busch led the first few laps. Martin Truex Jr. then took the lead from Busch and led for a while. After a caution, Jimmie Johnson stayed off of pit road and assumed the race lead. On the next caution, Johnson was able to get off pit road first and continued to lead. He led the most laps, 119 of the 270. Johnson's Hendrick Motorsports teammate Chase Elliott took the lead from Johnson. The final round of green flag pit stops began with 35 laps to go. Johnson was penalized for speeding on pit road. Elliott regained the lead and was pulling away to victory until Michael McDowell had a tire go down, sending the race into overtime. Ryan Blaney, Kasey Kahne, and Carl Edwards all stayed off pit road. On the restart, Truex took the lead from Blaney and held off Joey Logano to score his third win of the season and advancing to the next round of "The Chase."

Top-10 results:

1. #78 - Martin Truex Jr.
2. #22 - Joey Logano
3. #24 - Chase Elliott
4. #21 - Ryan Blaney
5. #2 - Brad Keselowski
6. #11 - Denny Hamlin
7. #5 - Kasey Kahne
8. #18 - Kyle Busch
9. #20 - Matt Kenseth
10. #88 - Alex Bowman

Round 28 - Loudon: Bad Boy Off Road 300

Carl Edwards started on pole. Martin Truex Jr. dominated the race, leading 141 laps. It was green for most of the race. Defending race winner Matt Kenseth also led a bunch of laps. Only one caution took place in the first place half of the race and only four cautions in the second half. One of them saw Trevor Bayne hit the wall hard. On that restart, Truex dropped a few spots. The next caution saw Ricky Stenhouse Jr. and Reed Sorenson make contact. On that restart, Kevin Harvick took the lead from Kenseth and held off the rest of the field to score his third win of the season, his first at New Hampshire since 2006, and advance to the next round of "The Chase."

Top-10 results:

1. #4 - Kevin Harvick
2. #20 - Matt Kenseth
3. #18 - Kyle Busch
4. #2 - Brad Keselowski
5. #41 - Kurt Busch
6. #19 - Carl Edwards
7. #78 - Martin Truex Jr.
8. #48 - Jimmie Johnson
9. #5 - Kasey Kahne
10. #42 - Kyle Larson

Round 29 - Dover: Citizen Soldier 400

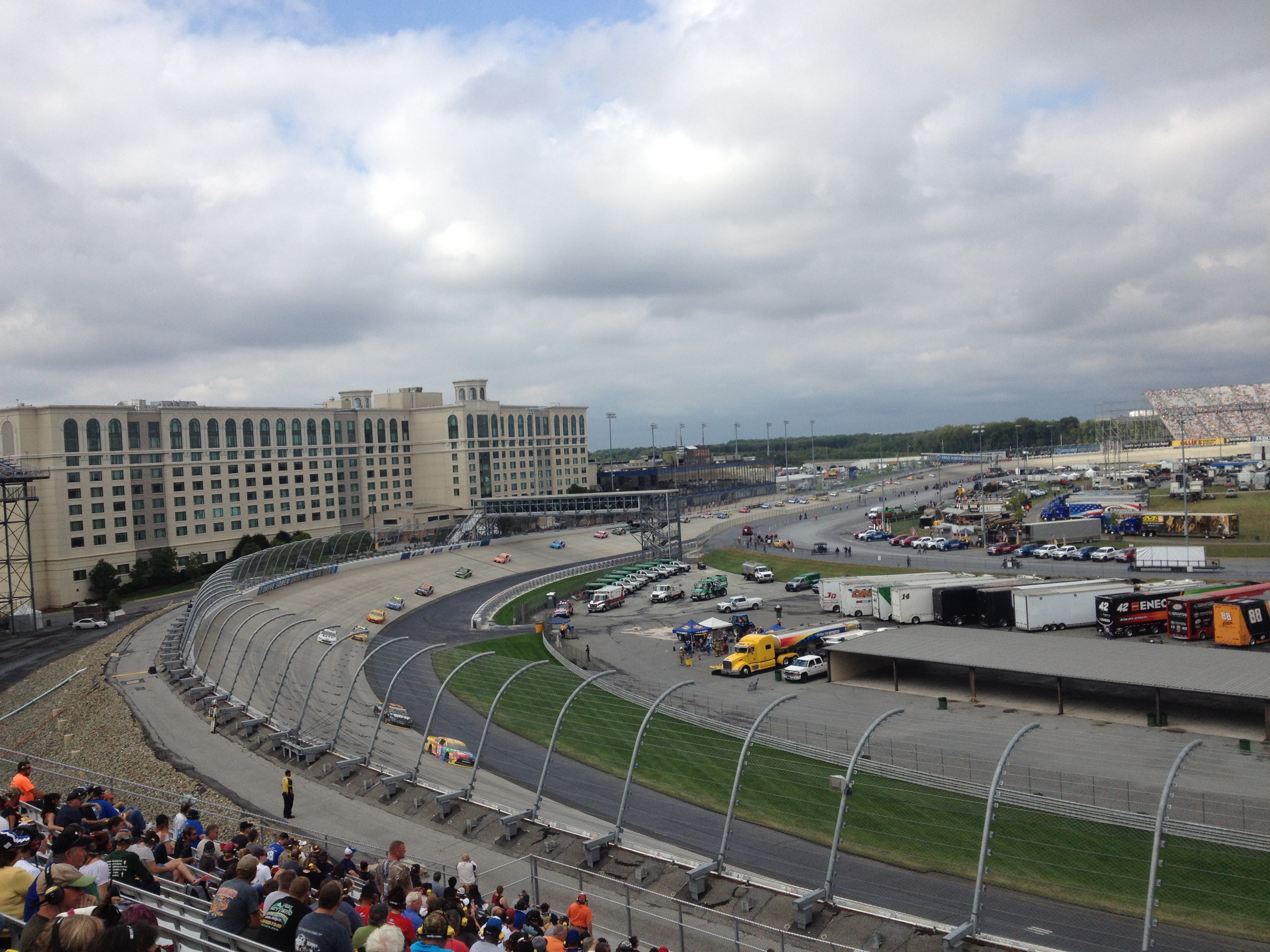
Kyle Busch leads in the Citizen Soldier 400 at Dover International Speedway in October.

Brad Keselowski was awarded the pole after qualifying was rained out and the field was set by points. Keselowski led the first few laps until he lost it to Martin Truex Jr. Kyle Busch then found his way to the lead. Kevin Harvick had trouble early after he suffered a broken track bar and had to go to the garage. Kyle Larson had problems with his entry after losing power. Larson's Chip Ganassi Racing teammate Jamie McMurray began having problems and his engine finally expired. Jimmie Johnson took the lead and led about 90 laps until he received a pit road penalty for his crewmen over the wall to soon. Due to this, Truex regained the lead and had a 9-second lead over Kyle Busch. Truex continued on to score his fourth win of the season and second at Dover. McMurray, Tony Stewart, Chris Buescher, and Larson were eliminated from "The Chase."

Top-10 results:

1. #78 - Martin Truex Jr.
2. #18 - Kyle Busch
3. #24 - Chase Elliott
4. #2 - Brad Keselowski
5. #20 - Matt Kenseth
6. #22 - Joey Logano
7. #48 - Jimmie Johnson
8. #3 - Austin Dillon
9. #11 - Denny Hamlin
10. #88 - Jeff Gordon

Round 30 - Charlotte: Bank of America 500

Kevin Harvick started on pole. Due to rain from Hurricane Matthew, the race was postponed from Saturday night until Sunday afternoon. Multiple Chase drivers had problems during the race. Pole-sitter Harvick had electrical problems, which took him out of the race. Joey Logano would hit the wall hard and have to go to the garage, but was able to get back on the track 78 laps down. Chase Elliott had a dominant car until he was taken out of the race from a wreck on a restart when Austin Dillon couldn't get going and spun out taking out Elliott, Brian Scott, and Paul Menard. Denny Hamlin also had a dominant car, but blew an engine late in the race. Martin Truex Jr. couldn't accelerate off pit road and lost some spots. Jimmie Johnson had a dominant car as well and he was able to hold off Matt Kenseth to get his eighth career win at Charlotte and his third win of the season to advance to the "Round of 8" in "The Chase."

Top-10 results:

1. #48 - Jimmie Johnson
2. #20 - Matt Kenseth
3. #5 - Kasey Kahne
4. #31 - Ryan Newman
5. #42 - Kyle Larson
6. #18 - Kyle Busch
7. #2 - Brad Keselowski
8. #41 - Kurt Busch
9. #14 - Tony Stewart
10. #1 - Jamie McMurray

Round 31 - Kansas: Hollywood Casino 400

Matt Kenseth started on pole. Kenseth led early until he got into the wall. Kevin Harvick took the lead and led until Chase Elliott took the lead. Elliott had a tire rub and lost the lead. Martin Truex Jr. had a great race until his team didn't get enough fuel in the car and then began experiencing fuel cell issues. Brad Keselowski was running in the top 10 when he made contact with Denny Hamlin and went spinning in the grass, destroying the front end of his car. Carl Edwards got the lead and led some laps. Keselowski was able to get back on the track, but his engine expired when he returned to the race. Austin Dillon took two tires on pit road and getting off before Edwards. Regan Smith slammed into the wall, bringing out the caution. On the restart, Harvick took the lead from Edwards and held him off to score his fourth win of the season and advance to the next round in "The Chase."

Top-10 results:

1. #4 - Kevin Harvick
2. #19 - Carl Edwards
3. #22 - Joey Logano
4. #48 - Jimmie Johnson
5. #18 - Kyle Busch
6. #3 - Austin Dillon
7. #88 - Alex Bowman
8. #47 - A. J. Allmendinger
9. #20 - Matt Kenseth
10. #5 - Kasey Kahne

Round 32 - Talladega: Hellmann's 500

Martin Truex Jr. started on pole. Truex didn't last long in the race because his engine expired early. A wreck took place which involved Greg Biffle, Jeffrey Earnhardt, and Casey Mears. Brad Keselowski, who was in a must win situation, dominated the race. However, debris on the grille caused Keselowski to overheat and his engine finally expired. After Keselowski was taken out, his teammate Joey Logano took control over the race. Kasey Kahne crashed late in the race, setting up a restart. On the restart, Alex Bowman spun, sending the race into overtime. On the restart, Logano held off Brian Scott to win get his second win of the season and his second consecutive Chase Talladega victory. Keselowski, Austin Dillon, Chase Elliott, and Martin Truex Jr. were eliminated from "The Chase."

Top-10 results:

1. #22 - Joey Logano
2. #44 - Brian Scott
3. #11 - Denny Hamlin
4. #41 - Kurt Busch
5. #17 - Ricky Stenhouse Jr.
6. #42 - Kyle Larson
7. #4 - Kevin Harvick
8. #43 - Aric Almirola
9. #3 - Austin Dillon
10. #47 - A. J. Allmendinger

Round 33 - Martinsville: Goody's Fast Relief 500

Martin Truex Jr. started on pole. Truex led 144 laps of the race. During the race, Chase contenders Jimmie Johnson and Denny Hamlin made contact sending Johnson to pit road with left-front damage. Matt Kenseth found his way to the lead and led the most laps. Carl Edwards had a tire go down and it brought out the caution, creating scoring issues. On the restart, Johnson took the lead from Hamlin and led the rest of the race and got his fourth win of the season and advance to the "Championship 4" at Homestead.

Top-10 results:

1. #48 - Jimmie Johnson
2. #2 - Brad Keselowski
3. #11 - Denny Hamlin
4. #20 - Matt Kenseth
5. #18 - Kyle Busch
6. #88 - Jeff Gordon
7. #78 - Martin Truex Jr.
8. #1 - Jamie McMurray
9. #22 - Joey Logano
10. #47 - A. J. Allmendinger
- This was Gordon's last start and last top 10.

Round 34 - Texas: AAA Texas 500

Austin Dillon won the pole. The race was delayed due to rain, but it would eventually start over six hours late. Joey Logano dominated the race and led the most laps. Martin Truex Jr. and Carl Edwards also ran up front. Both had problems with their cars and almost took each other out on pit road. Dillon crashed into the wall after contact with Kevin Harvick and it also involved Brian Scott and Casey Mears. Edwards was able to get off pit road ahead of Truex and was holding off Logano as rain was heading towards the track. It began to rain and the race was called official and Edwards was awarded his third win of the season and give him a spot in the "Championship 4" at Homestead.

Top-10 results:

1. #19 - Carl Edwards
2. #22 - Joey Logano
3. #78 - Martin Truex Jr.
4. #24 - Chase Elliott
5. #18 - Kyle Busch
6. #4 - Kevin Harvick
7. #20 - Matt Kenseth
8. #5 - Kasey Kahne
9. #11 - Denny Hamlin
10. #31 - Ryan Newman

Round 35 - Phoenix: Can-Am 500

Alex Bowman, who was still filling in for Dale Earnhardt Jr. won his first career pole. Bowman dominated the race by leading 193 laps. Chase contenders Jimmie Johnson, Joey Logano, and Matt Kenseth all led throughout the race. Johnson was penalized, which knocked him out of the lead and put him a lap down, but a wreck with Austin Dillon took him out of the race. Kenseth was on his way to a victory, but Michael McDowell wrecked and the caution came out with two laps to go. On the restart, Kyle Busch got in to Bowman and spun Kenseth, which knocked him out of the lead. On the restart, Logano pulled away from Kyle Busch to grab his third win of the season and to advance to the championship race at Homestead. With their wins Logano, Johnson, and Edwards made it to the championship race while Kyle Busch made it in on points. Kevin Harvick, Denny Hamlin, Kenseth, and Kurt Busch were eliminated.

Top-10 results:

1. #22 - Joey Logano
2. #18 - Kyle Busch
3. #42 - Kyle Larson
4. #4 - Kevin Harvick
5. #41 - Kurt Busch
6. #88 - Alex Bowman
7. #11 - Denny Hamlin
8. #21 - Ryan Blaney
9. #24 - Chase Elliott
10. #27 - Paul Menard

Round 36 - Homestead: Ford EcoBoost 400

Jimmie Johnson started form tail end of the field. Kevin Harvick won the pole. Harvick had the dominant car early in the race. Chase contenders Joey Logano and Carl Edwards had led during the race. Kyle Busch had a tire go down and had to make an unscheduled pit stop and went a lap down, but gained the lap back. Kyle Larson had the dominant car in the second half of the race and led the most laps. Edwards and Kyle Busch were battling for the championship lead until Dylan Lupton brought out the caution. On the restart, Logano got a great restart and Edwards blocked Logano and caused Edwards to crash into the wall and end his championship hopes in a multicar wreck that brought out the red flag. It brought the championship race down to Kyle Busch and Jimmie Johnson. On the restart, Logano got up to third and the caution came out for Ricky Stenhouse Jr. In an overtime finish, Johnson took the lead from Larson and won the race for his first career victory at Homestead and his seventh Sprint Cup series championship, tying Dale Earnhardt and Richard Petty for most championships all-time.

Top-10 results:

1. #48 - Jimmie Johnson
2. #42 - Kyle Larson
3. #4 - Kevin Harvick
4. #22 - Joey Logano
5. #1 - Jamie McMurray
6. #18 - Kyle Busch
7. #20 - Matt Kenseth
8. #47 - A. J. Allmendinger
9. #11 - Denny Hamlin
10. #59 - Michael McDowell
- This was Carl Edwards and Brian Scott's final start.

== Results and standings ==
=== Races ===
No.	Race	Pole position	Most laps led	Winning driver	Manufacturer	Report
	Sprint Unlimited	Jimmie Johnson	Denny Hamlin	Denny Hamlin	Toyota	Report
	Can-Am Duel 1	Chase Elliott	Dale Earnhardt Jr.	Dale Earnhardt Jr.	Chevrolet	Report
	Can-Am Duel 2	Matt Kenseth	Kyle Busch	Kyle Busch	Toyota	Report
1	Daytona 500	Chase Elliott	Denny Hamlin	Denny Hamlin	Toyota	Report
2	Folds of Honor QuikTrip 500	Kurt Busch	Kevin Harvick	Jimmie Johnson	Chevrolet	Report
3	Kobalt 400	Kurt Busch	Jimmie Johnson	Brad Keselowski	Ford	Report
4	Good Sam 500	Kyle Busch	Kevin Harvick	Kevin Harvick	Chevrolet	Report
5	Auto Club 400	Austin Dillon	Kevin Harvick	Jimmie Johnson	Chevrolet	Report
6	STP 500	Joey Logano	Kyle Busch	Kyle Busch	Toyota	Report
7	Duck Commander 500	Carl Edwards	Martin Truex Jr.	Kyle Busch	Toyota	Report
8	Food City 500	Carl Edwards	Carl Edwards	Carl Edwards	Toyota	Report
9	Toyota Owners 400	Kevin Harvick	Carl Edwards	Carl Edwards	Toyota	Report
10	GEICO 500	Chase Elliott	Brad Keselowski	Brad Keselowski	Ford	Report
11	Go Bowling 400	Martin Truex Jr.	Martin Truex Jr.	Kyle Busch	Toyota	Report
12	AAA 400 Drive for Autism	Kevin Harvick	Kevin Harvick	Matt Kenseth	Toyota	Report
	NASCAR Sprint Showdown	Chase Elliott	Chase Elliott	Kyle Larson	Chevrolet	Report
	NASCAR Sprint All-Star Race	Kevin Harvick	Brad Keselowski	Joey Logano	Ford	Report
13	Coca-Cola 600	Martin Truex Jr.	Martin Truex Jr.	Martin Truex Jr.	Toyota	Report
14	Axalta "We Paint Winners" 400	Brad Keselowski	Chase Elliott	Kurt Busch	Chevrolet	Report
15	FireKeepers Casino 400	Joey Logano	Joey Logano	Joey Logano	Ford	Report
16	Toyota/Save Mart 350	Carl Edwards	Denny Hamlin	Tony Stewart	Chevrolet	Report
17	Coke Zero 400	Greg Biffle	Brad Keselowski	Brad Keselowski	Ford	Report
18	Quaker State 400	Kevin Harvick	Kevin Harvick	Brad Keselowski	Ford	Report
19	New Hampshire 301	Jimmie Johnson	Kyle Busch	Matt Kenseth	Toyota	Report
20	Crown Royal presents the Combat Wounded Coalition 400 at the Brickyard	Kyle Busch	Kyle Busch	Kyle Busch	Toyota	Report
21	Pennsylvania 400	Martin Truex Jr.	Joey Logano	Chris Buescher	Ford	Report
22	Cheez-It 355 at The Glen	Carl Edwards	Brad Keselowski	Denny Hamlin	Toyota	Report
23	Bass Pro Shops NRA Night Race	Carl Edwards	Kyle Busch	Kevin Harvick	Chevrolet	Report
24	Pure Michigan 400	Joey Logano	Kyle Larson	Kyle Larson	Chevrolet	Report
25	Bojangles' Southern 500	Kevin Harvick	Kevin Harvick	Martin Truex Jr.	Toyota	Report
26	Federated Auto Parts 400	Denny Hamlin	Martin Truex Jr.	Denny Hamlin	Toyota	Report
Chase for the Sprint Cup
Round of 16
27	Teenage Mutant Ninja Turtles 400	Kyle Busch	Jimmie Johnson	Martin Truex Jr.	Toyota	Report
28	Bad Boy Off Road 300	Carl Edwards	Martin Truex Jr.	Kevin Harvick	Chevrolet	Report
29	Citizen Soldier 400	Brad Keselowski	Martin Truex Jr.	Martin Truex Jr.	Toyota	Report
Round of 12
30	Bank of America 500	Kevin Harvick	Jimmie Johnson	Jimmie Johnson	Chevrolet	Report
31	Hollywood Casino 400	Matt Kenseth	Matt Kenseth	Kevin Harvick	Chevrolet	Report
32	Hellmann's 500	Martin Truex Jr.	Brad Keselowski	Joey Logano	Ford	Report
Round of 8
33	Goody's Fast Relief 500	Martin Truex Jr.	Matt Kenseth	Jimmie Johnson	Chevrolet	Report
34	AAA Texas 500	Austin Dillon	Joey Logano	Carl Edwards	Toyota	Report
35	Can-Am 500	Alex Bowman	Alex Bowman	Joey Logano	Ford	Report
Championship 4
36	Ford EcoBoost 400	Kevin Harvick	Kyle Larson	Jimmie Johnson	Chevrolet	Report

=== Drivers' Championship ===
(key) Bold – Pole position awarded by time. Italics – Pole position set by final practice results or owner's points. * – Most laps led.
. – Eliminated after Round of 16 . – Eliminated after Round of 12 . – Eliminated after Round of 8

Pos.	Driver	DAY	ATL	LVS	PHO	CAL	MAR	TEX	BRI	RCH	TAL	KAN	DOV	CLT	POC	MCH	SON	DAY	KEN	NHA	IND	POC	GLN	BRI	MCH	DAR	RCH	CHI	NHA	DOV	CLT	KAN	TAL	MAR	TEX	PHO	HOM	Pts
1	Jimmie Johnson	16	1	3*	11	1	9	4	23	3	22	17	25	3	35	16	13	35	32	**12**	3	16	40	7	6	33	11	12*	8	7	1*	4	23	1	11	38	1	5040
2	Joey Logano	6	12	2	18	4	**11**	3	10	8	25	38	22	9	5	**1***	3	4	39	3	7	37*	2	10	**10**	5	10	2	11	6	36	3	1	9	2*	1	4	5037
3	Kyle Busch	3	3	4	**4**	25	1*	1	38	2	2	1	30	33	31	40	7	2	12	8*	**1***	9	6	39*	19	11	9	8	3	2	6	5	30	5	5	2	6	5035
4	Carl Edwards	5	5	18	2	7	6	**7**	**1***	1*	35	11	28	18	8	6	**4**	25	2	20	35	8	**15**	**6**	7	19	32	15	**6**	14	12	2	29	36	1	19	34	5007
Chase for the Sprint Cup cut-off
Pos.	Driver	DAY	ATL	LVS	PHO	CAL	MAR	TEX	BRI	RCH	TAL	KAN	DOV	CLT	POC	MCH	SON	DAY	KEN	NHA	IND	POC	GLN	BRI	MCH	DAR	RCH	CHI	NHA	DOV	CLT	KAN	TAL	MAR	TEX	PHO	HOM	Pts
5	Matt Kenseth	14	19	37	7	19	15	11	36	7	23	4	1	7	7	14	20	28	8	1	2	17	10	37	13	6	38	9	2	5	2	**9***	28	4*	7	21	7	2330
6	Denny Hamlin	1*	16	19	3	3	39	12	20	6	31	37	7	4	14	33	2*	17	15	9	4	7	1	3	9	4	**1**	6	15	9	30	15	3	3	9	7	9	2320
7	Kurt Busch	10	**4**	**9**	6	30	13	9	3	10	8	3	5	6	1	10	10	23	4	22	16	10	11	38	12	34	8	13	5	15	8	13	4	22	20	5	13	2296
8	Kevin Harvick	4	6*	7	1*	2*	17	10	7	5	15	2	15*	2	9	5	6	39	9*	4	6	4	32	1	5	2*	5	20	1	37	**38**	1	7	20	6	4	**3**	2289
9	Kyle Larson	7	26	34	12	39	3	14	35	15	29	35	2	13	11	3	12	6	19	17	5	6	29	24	1*	3	2	18	10	25	5	30	6	14	15	3	2*	2288
10	Chase Elliott **(R)**	**37**	8	38	8	6	20	5	4	12	**5**	9	3	8	4*	2	21	32	31	34	15	33	13	15	2	10	19	3	13	3	33	31	12	12	4	9	11	2285
11	Martin Truex Jr.	2	7	11	14	32	18	6*	14	9	13	**14***	9	**1***	19	12	5	29	10	16	8	**38**	7	23	20	1	3*	1	7*	1*	13	11	**40**	**7**	3	40	36	2271
12	Brad Keselowski	20	9	1	29	9	5	18	18	11	1*	10	6	5	**3**	4	15	1*	1	15	17	2	3*	33	3	9	4	5	4	4	7	38	38*	2	14	14	35	2267
13	Jamie McMurray	17	21	16	16	10	23	13	13	16	4	26	21	19	17	9	17	34	7	6	19	20	8	8	8	15	7	11	19	40	10	37	19	8	19	11	5	2231
14	Austin Dillon	9	11	5	9	**24**	4	19	26	20	3	6	33	12	37	8	22	7	16	13	9	13	31	4	16	12	13	14	16	8	32	6	9	17	**37**	39	12	2223
15	Tony Stewart									19	6	12	34	24	34	7	1	26	5	2	11	5	5	30	21	35	33	16	23	13	9	16	32	26	31	15	22	2211
16	Chris Buescher **(R)**	39	28	26	30	33	33	28	21	34	37	24	18	37	25	20	30	40	37	29	14	1	30	5	35	17	24	28	30	23	16	21	22	27	21	32	24	2169
17	Kasey Kahne	13	23	10	22	28	22	8	17	4	39	16	4	22	6	13	9	30	14	25	18	15	20	13	14	7	6	7	9	12	3	10	35	11	8	13	37	898
18	Ryan Newman	11	24	13	39	14	10	17	9	18	28	7	16	10	12	11	8	18	3	7	31	12	16	28	17	8	28	19	20	17	4	12	14	16	10	12	25	895
19	A. J. Allmendinger	21	27	14	17	8	2	22	19	25	14	8	23	16	16	38	14	13	36	21	38	14	4	9	15	23	20	17	21	19	37	8	10	10	17	17	8	830
20	Ryan Blaney **(R)**	19	25	6	10	35	19	29	11	28	9	5	8	20	10	17	23	14	35	11	36	11	19	35	4	13	39	4	12	38	31	14	11	19	12	8	26	812
21	Ricky Stenhouse Jr.	22	10	12	37	5	32	16	16	26	16	13	14	15	15	29	26	5	40	10	12	18	38	2	27	18	18	25	24	11	20	19	5	40	16	23	30	772
22	Trevor Bayne	28	22	17	23	20	27	15	5	17	10	25	10	25	13	15	25	3	11	23	30	19	9	12	24	40	14	23	38	20	18	17	17	23	30	28	20	762
23	Greg Biffle	34	13	20	21	37	12	39	12	14	20	27	29	11	26	19	18	**8**	6	5	39	25	39	16	11	36	23	26	33	18	35	25	15	13	18	16	17	691
24	Danica Patrick	35	20	21	19	38	16	21	27	24	24	20	13	21	32	21	19	27	17	14	22	22	21	22	23	24	15	24	18	28	11	18	20	24	24	29	19	689
25	Paul Menard	18	18	15	38	15	8	26	15	22	26	40	11	17	33	18	16	36	18	18	10	35	22	32	18	16	40	21	25	22	34	20	13	25	28	10	14	678
26	Aric Almirola	12	15	24	13	21	40	24	34	21	27	18	31	26	20	26	27	15	20	19	25	39	27	14	25	32	17	32	17	16	15	40	8	15	22	22	40	638
27	Clint Bowyer	33	35	22	31	18	25	38	8	33	7	19	12	23	18	23	40	9	23	24	21	26	18	31	40	22	22	22	22	24	17	26	18	28	25	24	23	628
28	Casey Mears	32	14	23	35	17	31	23	24	29	33	21	26	30	24	32	24	12	30	27	24	21	12	25	22	25	21	34	27	26	40	23	39	21	39	18	18	556
29	Landon Cassill	23	36	28	25	16	28	25	22	27	11	31	19	27	36	25	29	31	29	28	20	30	23	20	39	30	36	29	29	29	19	27	21	29	29	20	21	530
30	Michael McDowell	15	33	29	26	31	24		29	31	21	28	20	34			39	10		39	23	23	17	19	31	27	12	37	26		14	22	16	18	23	34	10	500
31	Brian Scott **(R)**	24	31	27	27	12	26	27	30	35	30	22	24	29	39	36	33	37	33	38	27	24	25	18	28	39	35	31	31	21	22	28	2	34	27	30	15	481
32	Dale Earnhardt Jr.	36	2	8	5	11	14	2	2	13	40	15	32	14	2	39	11	21	13																			461
33	David Ragan	29	32	32	24	22	21	33	39	23	34	29	17	31	23	22	32	16	22	30	37	32	33	21	29	21	34	35	32	30	23	36	24	37	33	31	29	455
34	Regan Smith	8	34	25	28	23	34	31	37	32	32	23	39	28	22	35	28	38	34	32	26	3	35	26	26	20	29	QL	34	31	21	29	25	30	26	27	38	452
35	Matt DiBenedetto	40	29	31	20	27	29	34	6	30	36	30	40	32	40	34	31	33	38	31	40	28	34	17	32	26	37	30	28	27	25	24	27	32	INQ	25	27	386
36	Michael Annett	27	30	30	33	29	35	32	31	36	38	32	37	36	38	28	36	20	26	33	28	29	37	QL	33	28	31	33	40	33	24	32	33	35	32	26	28	328
37	Cole Whitt	DNQ	37	39	36	26	30	30	28	DNQ	18	39	27	35	30	27	34	11	21		29	31	28	34	34	37	DNQ	36	35		27	33						276
38	Jeff Gordon																				13	27	14	11		14	16			10				6				218
39	Reed Sorenson	DNQ					37	36	40	40		33	38	40	28	31		22	27	35	33	40		27	36	31	26	39	36	35	28	34	37	38	35	36	32	198
40	Josh Wise	DNQ	39	35	34	36	38	40	33	39	DNQ	36	36	38	27	30	38	DNQ	24	40	DNQ	34	26	36	38	29	30	38	39	39	29	39			40			168
41	Jeffrey Earnhardt **(R)**		38	33		34		35	32	38			35	39		37			28					29	37	38	27		37	36	26		34	33	34	33	31	159
42	Brian Vickers	26		36		13	7	37																														86
43	Bobby Labonte	31									19							24															31					61
44	David Gilliland	DNQ									17							19															DNQ					46
45	Michael Waltrip	30									12																											42
46	Boris Said																						24															17
47	Patrick Carpentier																37				34																	11
48	Gray Gaulding																																	39		37	DNQ	6
49	Eddie MacDonald																			36																		5
50	Alex Kennedy																						36															5
51	Robert Richardson Jr.	38																																				3
Ineligible for Sprint Cup driver points
Pos.	Driver	DAY	ATL	LVS	PHO	CAL	MAR	TEX	BRI	RCH	TAL	KAN	DOV	CLT	POC	MCH	SON	DAY	KEN	NHA	IND	POC	GLN	BRI	MCH	DAR	RCH	CHI	NHA	DOV	CLT	KAN	TAL	MAR	TEX	PHO	HOM	Pts
52	Alex Bowman																			26					30			10	14		39	7	36		13	**6***	16	
53	Ty Dillon	25	17		15			20	25		QL				21	24			25									27		32							33	
54	Dylan Lupton																35										25							31			39	
55	Ryan Reed																																26					
56	Jeb Burton														29							36																
57	Joey Gase				32		36					34																40				35			36			
58	Ryan Ellis									37										37	32														38			
59	Timmy Hill																													34								
60	D. J. Kennington																																			35		
61	Justin Allgaier																							40														
62	Sam Hornish Jr.																								QL													
63	Cody Ware																DNQ																					

=== Manufacturers' Championship ===
Pos	Manufacturer	Wins	Points
1	**Toyota**	**16**	1477
2	Chevrolet	12	1452
3	Ford	8	1388

== Media coverage ==
2016 marked the second year of NASCAR's broadcast deal with Fox and NBC. The first 16 events were broadcast on either Fox or FS1, and the final 20 events were shared between NBC and NBCSN. However, the Cheez-It 355 at Watkins Glen International was aired on USA Network due to NBC's coverage of the 2016 Summer Olympics. In Canada, TSN televised each race, including the qualifying races for the Daytona 500 and exhibition races, under the name NASCAR on TSN. TSN also had coverage of practice and qualifying for each race. In Latin America, except Brazil, all races were broadcast by Fox Sports, on their Fox Sports 3 channel (previously known as SPEED Latin America). In Brazil, most races were broadcast by Fox Sports, on their Fox Sports 2 channel.

== See also ==
- 2016 NASCAR Xfinity Series
- 2016 NASCAR Camping World Truck Series
- 2016 NASCAR K&N Pro Series East
- 2016 NASCAR K&N Pro Series West
- 2016 NASCAR Whelen Modified Tour
- 2016 NASCAR Whelen Southern Modified Tour
- 2016 NASCAR Pinty's Series
- 2016 NASCAR Whelen Euro Series

== Notes ==
- ^1 The Sprint Showdown at Charlotte Motor Speedway was postponed from May 20 to May 21 because of inclement weather.
- ^2 The Axalta "We Paint Winners" 400 at Pocono Raceway was postponed from June 5 to June 6 because of inclement weather.
- ^3 The Pennsylvania 400 at Pocono Raceway was postponed from July 31 to August 1 because of inclement weather.
- ^4 The Bass Pro Shops NRA Night Race at Bristol Motor Speedway began on August 20, but was postponed to finish on August 21 due to inclement weather.
- ^5 The Bank of America 500 at Charlotte Motor Speedway was postponed from October 8 to October 9 because of Hurricane Matthew.
