= 2016 Sprint Unlimited =

2016 Sprint Unlimited at Daytona
Race details
- Race 1 of 2 exhibition races in the 2016 NASCAR Sprint Cup Series
- Date: February 13, 2016
- Location: Daytona International Speedway in Daytona Beach, Florida
- Course: Permanent racing facility
- Course length: 2.5 miles (4.023 km)
- Distance: 79 laps, 197.5 mi (317.845 km)
- Scheduled distance: 75 laps, 187.5 mi (301.752 km)
- Weather: Clear night skies with a temperature of 52 °F (11 °C); wind out of the north at 12 mph (19 km/h)
- Average speed: 128.432 mph (206.691 km/h)

Pole position
Driver	Jimmie Johnson	Hendrick Motorsports

Most laps led
Driver	Denny Hamlin	Joe Gibbs Racing
- Laps: 39

Winner
No. 11	Denny Hamlin	Joe Gibbs Racing

Television in the United States
- Network: Fox
- Announcers: Mike Joy, Jeff Gordon and Darrell Waltrip
- Nielsen ratings: 2.6/5 (Overnight)

Radio in the United States
- Radio: MRN
- Booth announcers: Joe Moore, Jeff Striegle and Rusty Wallace
- Turn announcers: Dave Moody (1 & 2), Mike Bagley (Backstretch) and Kyle Rickey (3 & 4)

The 2016 Sprint Unlimited at Daytona was a NASCAR Sprint Cup Series race held on February 13, 2016, at Daytona International Speedway in Daytona Beach, Florida. Contested over 79 laps, it was the first exhibition race of the 2016 NASCAR Sprint Cup Series season.

== Report ==
=== Background ===
Daytona International Speedway, the race track where the race was held.

Daytona International Speedway is a four-turn superspeedway that is 2.5 miles (4.0 kilometres) long. The track's turns are banked at 31 degrees, while the front stretch, the location of the finish line, is banked at 18 degrees.

=== Format and eligibility ===
The race was 75 laps in length, and divided into two segments; the first was 25 laps and the second was 50 laps. The race was open to those drivers who won a pole in the 2015 season or had won the Sprint Unlimited previously.

=== Entry list ===
The entry list for the Sprint Unlimited was released on Friday, February 12 at 2:20 p.m. Eastern time. Twenty-five drivers were entered for the race. Tony Stewart was slated to run the Sprint Unlimited, but after suffering a burst fracture of his L1 vertebra, Brian Vickers drove in his place. While Vickers was not technically eligible because he does not fit any of the criteria for eligibility, he was cleared by NASCAR to compete in the event.

No.	Driver	Team	Manufacturer
1	Jamie McMurray (C)	Chip Ganassi Racing	Chevrolet
2	Brad Keselowski (P)	Team Penske	Ford
3	Austin Dillon (D)	Richard Childress Racing	Chevrolet
4	Kevin Harvick (P)	Stewart–Haas Racing	Chevrolet
5	Kasey Kahne (P)	Hendrick Motorsports	Chevrolet
10	Danica Patrick (D)	Stewart–Haas Racing	Chevrolet
11	Denny Hamlin (P)	Joe Gibbs Racing	Toyota
13	Casey Mears *	Germain Racing	Chevrolet
14	Brian Vickers *	Stewart–Haas Racing	Chevrolet
15	Clint Bowyer (C)	HScott Motorsports	Chevrolet
16	Greg Biffle (D)	Roush Fenway Racing	Ford
17	Ricky Stenhouse Jr. *	Roush Fenway Racing	Ford
18	Kyle Busch (P)	Joe Gibbs Racing	Toyota
19	Carl Edwards (P)	Joe Gibbs Racing	Toyota
20	Matt Kenseth (P)	Joe Gibbs Racing	Toyota
22	Joey Logano (P)	Team Penske	Ford
27	Paul Menard (C)	Richard Childress Racing	Chevrolet
31	Ryan Newman (C)	Richard Childress Racing	Chevrolet
41	Kurt Busch (P)	Stewart–Haas Racing	Chevrolet
42	Kyle Larson *	Chip Ganassi Racing	Chevrolet
43	Aric Almirola *	Richard Petty Motorsports	Ford
47	A. J. Allmendinger (P)	JTG Daugherty Racing	Chevrolet
48	Jimmie Johnson (P)	Hendrick Motorsports	Chevrolet
78	Martin Truex Jr. (D)	Furniture Row Racing	Toyota
88	Dale Earnhardt Jr. (W)	Hendrick Motorsports	Chevrolet
Official entry list

Key	Meaning
(P)	Eligible as a pole winner in 2015
(W)	Eligible as a past winner of the race
(D)	Eligible as a past Daytona 500 pole winner
(C)	Eligible for being in the Chase in 2015
*	Eligible via points or other reasons

== Starting lineup ==
The starting lineup was determined by a random draw, with Jimmie Johnson drawing the top spot.

Pos	No.	Driver	Team	Manufacturer
1	48	Jimmie Johnson	Hendrick Motorsports	Chevrolet
2	2	Brad Keselowski	Team Penske	Ford
3	47	A. J. Allmendinger	JTG Daugherty Racing	Chevrolet
4	42	Kyle Larson	Chip Ganassi Racing	Chevrolet
5	31	Ryan Newman	Richard Childress Racing	Chevrolet
6	13	Casey Mears	Germain Racing	Chevrolet
7	78	Martin Truex Jr.	Furniture Row Racing	Toyota
8	15	Clint Bowyer	HScott Motorsports	Chevrolet
9	18	Kyle Busch	Joe Gibbs Racing	Toyota
10	3	Austin Dillon	Richard Childress Racing	Chevrolet
11	17	Ricky Stenhouse Jr.	Roush Fenway Racing	Ford
12	10	Danica Patrick	Stewart–Haas Racing	Chevrolet
13	20	Matt Kenseth	Joe Gibbs Racing	Toyota
14	27	Paul Menard	Richard Childress Racing	Chevrolet
15	11	Denny Hamlin	Joe Gibbs Racing	Toyota
16	16	Greg Biffle	Roush Fenway Racing	Ford
17	43	Aric Almirola	Richard Petty Motorsports	Ford
18	14	Brian Vickers	Stewart–Haas Racing	Chevrolet
19	19	Carl Edwards	Joe Gibbs Racing	Toyota
20	5	Kasey Kahne	Hendrick Motorsports	Chevrolet
21	41	Kurt Busch	Stewart–Haas Racing	Chevrolet
22	4	Kevin Harvick	Stewart–Haas Racing	Chevrolet
23	88	Dale Earnhardt Jr.	Hendrick Motorsports	Chevrolet
24	1	Jamie McMurray	Chip Ganassi Racing	Chevrolet
25	22	Joey Logano	Team Penske	Ford
Official starting lineup

== Practice ==
=== First practice ===
Kyle Larson was the fastest in the first practice session with a time of 45.148 and a speed of 199.344 mph (320.813 km/h).

Pos	No.	Driver	Team	Manufacturer	Time	Speed
1	42	Kyle Larson	Chip Ganassi Racing	Chevrolet	45.148	199.344
2	5	Kasey Kahne	Hendrick Motorsports	Chevrolet	45.190	199.159
3	11	Denny Hamlin	Joe Gibbs Racing	Toyota	45.211	199.067
Official first practice results

=== Final practice ===
Denny Hamlin was the fastest in the final practice session with a time of 45.242 and a speed of 198.930 mph (320.147 km/h).

Pos	No.	Driver	Team	Manufacturer	Time	Speed
1	11	Denny Hamlin	Joe Gibbs Racing	Toyota	45.242	198.930
2	15	Clint Bowyer	HScott Motorsports	Chevrolet	46.094	195.253
3	43	Aric Almirola	Richard Petty Motorsports	Ford	46.181	194.885
Official final practice results

== Race ==
=== First half ===
==== Start ====
Under a clear Florida night sky, Jimmie Johnson led the field to the green flag at 8:35 p.m. Brad Keselowski used a push from the outside line to lead the first lap. After five laps, the field settled into a single line until Jamie McMurray went under Casey Mears in turn 3 to move up to fourth. Eventually, Keselowski found himself working the top and bottom line to maintain the lead. Unfortunately, he had to drag the brake to let McMurray pass him going into 3 to get a piece of debris off the grill of his car. This gambit failed and fell back to 15th. The first caution of the race flew on lap 13 for a two-car wreck in turn 2. Rounding the turn, Ricky Stenhouse Jr. suffered a right-rear tire blowout and spun down into the side of Denny Hamlin. The front half of the field opted to stay out while the back half opted to pit.

==== Second quarter ====
The race restarted on lap 18. McMurray got a jump on the field, but was swallowed up and passed by teammate Kyle Larson. He was, however, able to hold the lead and pull in front of his teammate on the backstretch. The second caution of the race flew on lap 23 for a multi-car wreck in turn 1. Going into the turn, Brian Vickers suffered a right-rear tire blowout, hit the side of Dale Earnhardt Jr.'s car and ripped the side of his car off, turned back up the track, hit teammate Kevin Harvick, slammed the wall, slid back down the track and clipped Clint Bowyer. A. J. Allmendinger, Greg Biffle and Kurt Busch also sustained damage in this wreck. Vickers said he didn't "know how it happened. The '18' and I got together going four-wide early in the race and had a little smoke for a lap and it went away. I suspect that could have been it or I could have just ran over something, there's no telling.” Harvick would go on to finish last. Hamlin opted not to pit and assumed the lead.

=== Second half ===
==== Halfway ====
The race restarted on lap 30. Hamlin took command of the field and moved ahead of the No. 2 car. Eventually, Keselowski moved by him coming to the line and took the lead on lap 34. Hamlin shot ahead of Keselowski on the backstretch to take the lead back the next lap. Keselowski used a push from teammate Joey Logano to retake the lead on lap 37. Just like his first stint in the lead, he picked up another piece of debris that covered his grill. The third caution of the race flew on lap 44 for a single-car spin on the backstretch. Going down the backstretch, Johnson made contact with Mears that sent him spinning through the grass. His car dug into the ground and ripped off the front fender. He said afterwards that he "did a decent job of backing out of there and not causing a big one as the door shut on me." Keselowski opted to stay out while the rest of the field opted to pit.

The race restarted on lap 48. Hamlin powered ahead of Keselowski to take over the lead on lap 49. The fourth caution of the race flew with 20 laps to go for a multi-car wreck on the backstretch. Going into turn 3, Kasey Kahne got turned by McMurray and slammed into the side of Allmendinger.

==== Fourth quarter ====
The race restarted with 14 laps to go. Keselowski got a run on Hamlin in the tri-oval to take the lead back with 12 laps to go. The fifth caution of the race flew with 10 laps to go after Kahne lost an engine in turn 2.

The race restarted with six laps to go. Hamlin was able to hold off charges from his teammate Matt Kenseth and Logano. The sixth caution of the race flew with three laps to go for a multi-car wreck on the backstretch. In a classic restrictor plate racing accordion effect, Carl Edwards got turned into the wall and a number of cars spun out. This would lead to the debut of the new overtime rules NASCAR put into play two days prior.

===== Overtime =====
The race restarted with two laps to go. The field passed the overtime line and the race was official at that point. After a multi-car wreck in turn 1, Hamlin was declared the race winner.

== Post-race ==
Hamlin said after the race in victory lane that he's "gotten better at speedway racing over the last few years and really learned a lot from my teammates. But realistically you can go back and look at this race a million times, and had my teammates not stuck with me at the right times, we wouldn't have been able to stay up front." He added he "wanted to get to the (overtime) line, because we probably didn’t have enough fuel to go five more laps."

After a runner-up finish, Logano said that he thought he had Hamlin "if that caution didn’t come out at the end." He followed up by saying had "I got that push from the 42, [Kyle] Larson, I might have done it. It just didn’t line up perfectly.”

After finishing 10th, Biffle spoke on the new overtime rule saying he thought "it was OK. I get what they're trying to do. They're trying to prevent people from changing the outcome of the race and make that mark back there, and that makes sense. It'll take us a little bit to get used to that, but I understand it."

After finishing 11th, Danica Patrick said that she doesn't "think it'll end up making a humongous difference. I mean, the likelihood of having a lot of accidents within the first corner, they're not super-high. I don't know. I think it'll be fine. I don't think we'll really notice a huge difference."

After finishing 13th, Martin Truex Jr. said that "in this day and age, we always judge everything on the fans' reaction. So I guess we'll wait and see what they say about it."

== Race results ==
Pos	No.	Driver	Team	Manufacturer	Laps
1	11	Denny Hamlin	Joe Gibbs Racing	Toyota	79
2	22	Joey Logano	Team Penske	Ford	79
3	27	Paul Menard	Richard Childress Racing	Chevrolet	79
4	42	Kyle Larson	Chip Ganassi Racing	Chevrolet	79
5	13	Casey Mears	Germain Racing	Chevrolet	79
6	17	Ricky Stenhouse Jr.	Roush Fenway Racing	Ford	79
7	41	Kurt Busch	Stewart–Haas Racing	Chevrolet	79
8	3	Austin Dillon	Richard Childress Racing	Chevrolet	79
9	2	Brad Keselowski	Team Penske	Ford	79
10	16	Greg Biffle	Roush Fenway Racing	Ford	79
11	10	Danica Patrick	Stewart–Haas Racing	Chevrolet	79
12	20	Matt Kenseth	Joe Gibbs Racing	Toyota	79
13	78	Martin Truex Jr.	Furniture Row Racing	Toyota	78
14	1	Jamie McMurray	Chip Ganassi Racing	Chevrolet	78
15	88	Dale Earnhardt Jr.	Hendrick Motorsports	Chevrolet	75
16	19	Carl Edwards	Joe Gibbs Racing	Toyota	72
17	18	Kyle Busch	Joe Gibbs Racing	Toyota	72
18	43	Aric Almirola	Richard Petty Motorsports	Ford	72
19	31	Ryan Newman	Richard Childress Racing	Chevrolet	69
20	5	Kasey Kahne	Hendrick Motorsports	Chevrolet	64
21	47	A. J. Allmendinger	JTG Daugherty Racing	Chevrolet	56
22	48	Jimmie Johnson	Hendrick Motorsports	Chevrolet	43
23	15	Clint Bowyer	HScott Motorsports	Chevrolet	23
24	14	Brian Vickers	Stewart–Haas Racing	Chevrolet	22
25	4	Kevin Harvick	Stewart–Haas Racing	Chevrolet	22
Unofficial race results

== Media ==
=== Television ===
Fox
Booth announcers	Pit reporters
Lap-by-lap: Mike Joy; Color-commentator: Jeff Gordon; Color commentator: Darrell Waltrip	Jamie Little; Chris Neville; Vince Welch; Matt Yocum

=== Radio ===
MRN Radio
Booth announcers	Turn announcers	Pit reporters
Lead announcer: Joe Moore; Announcer: Jeff Striegle; Announcer: Rusty Wallace	Turns 1 & 2: Dave Moody; Backstretch: Mike Bagley; Turns 3 & 4: Kyle Rickey	Alex Hayden; Winston Kelley; Steve Post

== See also ==
- 2016 Can-Am Duels, held on February 18
- 2016 Daytona 500, held on February 21
