= Pat Tryson =

NASCAR crew chief

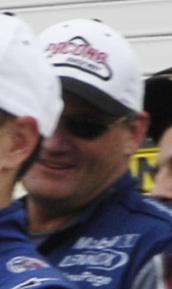
- Tryson at Pocono Raceway in 2007

Personal information
- Born: Patrick John Tryson; March 4, 1964 (age 62) Malvern, Pennsylvania, U.S.

Sport
- Country: United States
- Sport: NASCAR Xfinity Series
- Team: 99. Viking Motorsports

Patrick John Tryson (born March 4, 1964) is an American NASCAR crew chief who works for Viking Motorsports as the head of the team's race shop operations. He previously worked as the team's crew chief on their No. 99 Chevrolet Camaro in 2025.

Tryson previously worked as a crew chief for Geoff Bodine Racing, Roush Racing, Wood Brothers Racing, Penske Racing, Michael Waltrip Racing, JTG Daugherty Racing, BK Racing, The Motorsports Group, Circle Sport – The Motorsports Group, Premium Motorsports, Rick Ware Racing, Our Motorsports, B. J. McLeod Motorsports and Alpha Prime Racing.

== Career ==
=== 1997–2007: King Racing, Geoff Bodine Racing and Roush Racing ===
Tryson began his racing career working with Kenny Bernstein at King Racing. In 1997, he became a crew chief for Geoff Bodine and his Geoff Bodine Racing operation, but quit the team during the August race at Bristol Motor Speedway after arguing with team manager Tim Brewer over pit strategy after Bodine fell two laps down. Incidentally, Tryson moved to Geoff's younger brother Todd's car for the 1998 season.

In 1999, Tryson joined Roush Racing to become the crew chief for Kevin Lepage and Johnny Benson. While the crew chief for Lepage, he recorded one pole position, two top-five and five top-ten finishes. Afterward, he left the team to work at Wood Brothers Racing in 2000. While there he was the crew chief for two drivers: Elliott Sadler and Ricky Rudd, and won one race at Bristol. Four years later, he returned to Roush as the crew chief for Mark Martin. He was able to become one of three other crew chiefs to make the Chase for the Sprint Cup in its first three seasons, with the others being Robbie Reiser and Chad Knaus.

=== 2007–2011: Penske Racing and Michael Waltrip Racing ===
Midway through the 2007 season, Tryson left Roush again, moving to Penske Racing to become the crew chief for Kurt Busch and the No. 2 team. He remained in that capacity through 2009, when at the end of the season, he decided to move to Michael Waltrip Racing to become the crew chief for the new No. 56 team of Martin Truex Jr. Tryson was replaced by Chad Johnston as Truex's crew chief in June 2011, and he was moved to JTG Daugherty Racing (which at the time had an alliance with MWR), where he became a consultant.

=== 2012–2015 ===
In 2012, Tryson started the season as crew chief for David Gilliland at Front Row Motorsports. In October 2012, Tryson joined BK Racing, serving as crew chief for the team's No. 93 car and driver Travis Kvapil. He continued with BK in 2013, moving from the No. 93 to the No. 83, which was driven full time by David Reutimann. In mid-summer 2013, he left the team.

In 2014, Tryson joined Turner Scott Motorsports in the Nationwide Series as crew chief for rookie Dylan Kwasniewski. Tryson was replaced by Shannon Rursch on July 17.

Tryson was picked up by Curtis Key's The Motorsports Group team to be crew chief of the No. 30 car driven by Ron Hornaday Jr. in 2015. After not qualifying for 3 of their attempted 7 races, both Hornaday and Tryson were released from the team. Tryson was picked up by Circle Sport to crew chief the team of Alex Kennedy. After being replaced by Paul Clapprood starting at Kentucky, for the rest of the 2015 season, Tryson worked for Hattori Racing Enterprises. This included serving as crew chief for their part-time No. 80 Xfinity Series car when it attempted the race at Phoenix with Ross Kenseth.

=== 2016–present ===
In 2016, Tryson joined Premium Motorsports as the crew chief of their No. 55 car in the Cup Series. In 2017, Tryson returned to TMG, which became Circle Sport – The Motorsports Group, to serve as crew chief of the No. 33 driven by Jeffrey Earnhardt. He did not return to the team after the race at Michigan in June, and returned to Premium Motorsports soon after. He would remain with Premium for the next two years as crew chief of the team's No. 15 car, mostly driven by Ross Chastain.

Tryson remained the crew chief of the No. 15 in 2020, which was driven by rookie Brennan Poole full-time. Rick Ware Racing would buy Premium Motorsports during the COVID-19 break. He returned as crew chief of the RWR No. 15 car in 2021. That year, the car was driven by multiple drivers: Derrike Cope, James Davison, Joey Gase, Chris Windom, J. J. Yeley, and Bayley Currey. After the race at Watkins Glen, Tryson would leave for Our Motorsports to crew chief Brett Moffitt and their No. 02 car in the Xfinity Series, replacing Joe Williams, who moved to SS-Green Light Racing to crew chief Joe Graf Jr.'s No. 07 car. In 2022, Tryson returned to Our Motorsports but moved to the team's No. 23 car of Anthony Alfredo, replacing Kenneth Roettger Jr.

On January 17, 2025, it was announced that Tryson would crew chief Matt DiBenedetto's No. 99 car in the Xfinity Series for Viking Motorsports. On November 7, 2025, Viking announced that former AM Racing crew chief Danny Efland would take over as crew chief of their No. 99 car, now driven by Parker Retzlaff in 2026 with Tryson transitioning to a new role as the head of the team's race shop operations.

== Personal life ==
Tryson's father is Joe Tryson, a longtime crew chief for drag racer Bill "Grumpy" Jenkins. Tryson graduated from West Chester University, where he earned a Bachelor of Arts degree in Business Administration.
