= Mike Ford (NASCAR) =

American NASCAR crew chief (born 1970)

Personal information
- Nationality: (United States) American
- Born: Michael Ford; April 13, 1970 (age 56) Morristown, Tennessee, U.S.

Sport
- Country: United States
- Sport: NASCAR Xfinity Series
- Team: RSS Racing

Michael “Mike” Ford (born April 13, 1970) is an American NASCAR crew chief from Morristown, Tennessee who most recently was known to be working for RSS Racing in the NASCAR Xfinity Series.

Ford resides in Stanley, North Carolina with his wife, Robin, and their two children Alex and Austin.

== Career ==
Ford's racing career began in the late 1980s when he worked at SABCO Racing under the direction of Gary Nelson, who now works as NASCAR's vice president of research and development. Ford's duties included a little bit of everything, including suspension work and car set-up.

=== 1990s–2005: Dale Jarrett and Bill Elliott (Yates and Evernham) ===
Before landing his first crew chiefing job with Bill Elliott’s team in 2000, Ford worked as a mechanic and jackman with Dale Jarrett's No. 88 team for Robert Yates Racing from 1996 to 1999. During that time, Jarrett never finished lower than third in points, won the 1999 NASCAR Winston Cup Series championship, the 1996 Daytona 500, and scored victories in the Brickyard 400 in 1996 and 1999. The team won a total of 18 races during the four-year period.

2000 was the last year of Elliott's tenure as an owner/driver, and when he moved to the new Evernham Motorsports team starting in 2001 (and continuing through 2003), Ford continued as his crew chief. With Evernham, Elliott and Mike Ford won four races, including the 2002 Brickyard 400.

When Elliott semi-retired after the 2003 season, Ford did not continue with the No. 9 team for Evernham with their new driver, rookie Kasey Kahne, and Ford instead rejoined Yates and Jarrett's No. 88 team, this time as crew chief. Ford led Jarrett to a victory in the 2004 Budweiser Shootout at Daytona to start the year. Ford hired Russ Salerno as his Pit Crew Coach in 2004 to help with pit crew performance.

=== 2005–2011: Joe Gibbs Racing (Jason Leffler and Denny Hamlin) ===
After 11 races in 2005, Ford left RYR and was later announced as the new crew chief for Jason Leffler and the Joe Gibbs Racing No. 11 team starting at Dover, replacing rookie crew chief Dave Rogers, who was taken and reassigned within JGR after the team did not qualify for the Coca-Cola 600. After the team still was not improving to the level the team wanted and expected, Leffler was also released and was replaced on an interim basis by Terry Labonte (whose brother Bobby was driving for Gibbs in the No. 18 at the time), and later their Busch Series drivers J. J. Yeley and Denny Hamlin. Ford worked with Hamlin full-time in 2006 when he got the ride. The two started off on a high note, winning the Budweiser Shootout, and sweeping both races at Pocono. Hamlin won Rookie of the Year in 2006 and finished an impressive third in points.

In 2007, Ford and Hamlin won one race at New Hampshire in June and finished twelfth in points, their lowest points finish together. They had a similar year in 2008, winning once at the spring Martinsville race but improving to eighth in points.

As crew chief of the No. 11 car, Mike Ford won 17 races and had championship finishes of 2nd, 3rd, 5th, 8th, 9th, and 12th. Ford and Hamlin never missed the chase in their six years paired together. On Dec 6th, 2011, Joe Gibbs Racing released Ford after a dismal year in 2011, only winning one race and dropping to ninth in points.

=== 2012–present (Richard Petty Motorsports, BK Racing, Athenian Motorsports, RSS Racing) ===
On April 30, 2012, Ford replaced Greg Erwin as crew chief for the No. 43 Richard Petty Motorsports Ford, driven by Aric Almirola, for the rest of the 2012 season. On September 10, 2012, Richard Petty Motorsports announced that they would swap crew chiefs between their two teams, with Ford moving from Almirola's No. 43 to the No. 9 of Marcos Ambrose, while Ambrose's crew chief, Todd Parrott, would become the new crew chief for the No. 43. However, after just seven races, Richard Petty Motorsports announced on October 30, 2012, that Ford was no longer with the organization and would be replaced by Drew Blickensderfer as Ambrose's crew chief.

In December 2012, Ford was hired as the competition director for BK Racing. He left BK Racing in October 2014 for Athenian Motorsports through the majority of 2015.

Ford returned to BK in a crew chief role for the 2016 Daytona 500, working with the part-time No. 26 and No. 93 teams as crew chief for Robert Richardson, Jr. and Ryan Ellis.

In 2017, Ford was hired as the competition director for GMS Racing’s No. 23 team in the Xfinity Series.

On April 10, 2018, it was announced that Ford had rejoined Sieg's team in some sort of consultant role. It is unclear if Ford is still working for them today.
