= 2016 Coca-Cola 600 =

Race details
- Race 13 of 36 in the 2016 NASCAR Sprint Cup Series
- Date: May 29, 2016
- Location: Charlotte Motor Speedway in Concord, North Carolina
- Course: Permanent racing facility
- Course length: 1.5 miles (2.4 km)
- Distance: 400 laps, 600 mi (960 km)
- Average speed: 160.655 mph (258.549 km/h)

Pole position
Driver	Martin Truex Jr.	Furniture Row Racing
- Time: 28.077

Most laps led
Driver	Martin Truex Jr.	Furniture Row Racing
- Laps: 392

Winner
No. 78	Martin Truex Jr.	Furniture Row Racing

Television in the United States
- Network: Fox
- Announcers: Mike Joy, Jeff Gordon and Darrell Waltrip
- Nielsen ratings: 3.2/8 (Overnight); 3.4/9 (Final); 5.7 million viewers

Radio in the United States
- Radio: PRN
- Booth announcers: Doug Rice, Mark Garrow and Wendy Venturini
- Turn announcers: Rob Albright (1 & 2) and Pat Patterson (3 & 4)

The 2016 Coca-Cola 600, the 57th running of the event, was a NASCAR Sprint Cup Series race held on May 29, 2016, at Charlotte Motor Speedway in Concord, North Carolina. Contested over 400 laps on the 1.5 mile (2.42 km) asphalt speedway, it was the thirteenth race of the 2016 NASCAR Sprint Cup season. The race had nine lead changes among four different drivers and four cautions for 19 laps.

== Report ==
=== Background ===
Charlotte Motor Speedway, the track where the race was held.

The race was held at Charlotte Motor Speedway, which is located in Concord, North Carolina. The speedway complex includes a 1.5-mile (2.4 km) quad-oval track.

=== Entry list ===
The initial entry list for the race was released on May 23, 2016, at 8:54 am ET with forty cars.

No.	Driver	Team	Manufacturer
1	Jamie McMurray	Chip Ganassi Racing	Chevrolet
2	Brad Keselowski	Team Penske	Ford
3	Austin Dillon	Richard Childress Racing	Chevrolet
4	Kevin Harvick	Stewart–Haas Racing	Chevrolet
5	Kasey Kahne	Hendrick Motorsports	Chevrolet
6	Trevor Bayne	Roush Fenway Racing	Ford
7	Regan Smith	Tommy Baldwin Racing	Chevrolet
10	Danica Patrick	Stewart–Haas Racing	Chevrolet
11	Denny Hamlin	Joe Gibbs Racing	Toyota
13	Casey Mears	Germain Racing	Chevrolet
14	Tony Stewart	Stewart–Haas Racing	Chevrolet
15	Clint Bowyer	HScott Motorsports	Chevrolet
16	Greg Biffle	Roush Fenway Racing	Ford
17	Ricky Stenhouse Jr.	Roush Fenway Racing	Ford
18	Kyle Busch	Joe Gibbs Racing	Toyota
19	Carl Edwards	Joe Gibbs Racing	Toyota
20	Matt Kenseth	Joe Gibbs Racing	Toyota
21	Ryan Blaney (R)	Wood Brothers Racing	Ford
22	Joey Logano	Team Penske	Ford
23	David Ragan	BK Racing	Toyota
24	Chase Elliott (R)	Hendrick Motorsports	Chevrolet
27	Paul Menard	Richard Childress Racing	Chevrolet
30	Josh Wise	The Motorsports Group	Chevrolet
31	Ryan Newman	Richard Childress Racing	Chevrolet
32	Jeffrey Earnhardt (R)	Go FAS Racing	Ford
34	Chris Buescher (R)	Front Row Motorsports	Ford
38	Landon Cassill	Front Row Motorsports	Ford
41	Kurt Busch	Stewart–Haas Racing	Chevrolet
42	Kyle Larson	Chip Ganassi Racing	Chevrolet
43	Aric Almirola	Richard Petty Motorsports	Ford
44	Brian Scott (R)	Richard Petty Motorsports	Ford
46	Michael Annett	HScott Motorsports	Chevrolet
47	A. J. Allmendinger	JTG Daugherty Racing	Chevrolet
48	Jimmie Johnson	Hendrick Motorsports	Chevrolet
55	Reed Sorenson	Premium Motorsports	Chevrolet
78	Martin Truex Jr.	Furniture Row Racing	Toyota
83	Matt DiBenedetto	BK Racing	Toyota
88	Dale Earnhardt Jr.	Hendrick Motorsports	Chevrolet
95	Michael McDowell	Circle Sport – Leavine Family Racing	Chevrolet
98	Cole Whitt	Premium Motorsports	Chevrolet
Official entry list

== Practice ==
=== First practice ===
Kurt Busch was the fastest in the first practice session with a time of 28.002 and a speed of 192.843 mph (310.351 km/h).

Pos	No.	Driver	Team	Manufacturer	Time	Speed
1	41	Kurt Busch	Stewart–Haas Racing	Chevrolet	28.002	192.843
2	48	Jimmie Johnson	Hendrick Motorsports	Chevrolet	28.235	191.252
3	19	Carl Edwards	Joe Gibbs Racing	Toyota	28.266	191.042
Official first practice results

=== Second practice ===
Kurt Busch continued to be quickest into the second practice session with a time of 28.272 and a speed of 191.002 mph (307.388 km/h).

Pos	No.	Driver	Team	Manufacturer	Time	Speed
1	41	Kurt Busch	Stewart–Haas Racing	Chevrolet	28.272	191.002
2	48	Jimmie Johnson	Hendrick Motorsports	Chevrolet	28.329	190.617
3	78	Martin Truex Jr.	Furniture Row Racing	Toyota	28.412	190.061
Official second practice results

=== Final practice ===
Martin Truex Jr. was the fastest in the final practice session with a time of 28.972 and a speed of 186.387 mph (299.961 km/h).

Pos	No.	Driver	Team	Manufacturer	Time	Speed
1	78	Martin Truex, Jr.	Furniture Row Racing	Toyota	28.972	186.387
2	41	Kurt Busch	Stewart–Haas Racing	Chevrolet	29.074	185.733
3	48	Jimmie Johnson	Hendrick Motorsports	Chevrolet	29.126	185.401
Official final practice results

== Qualifying ==
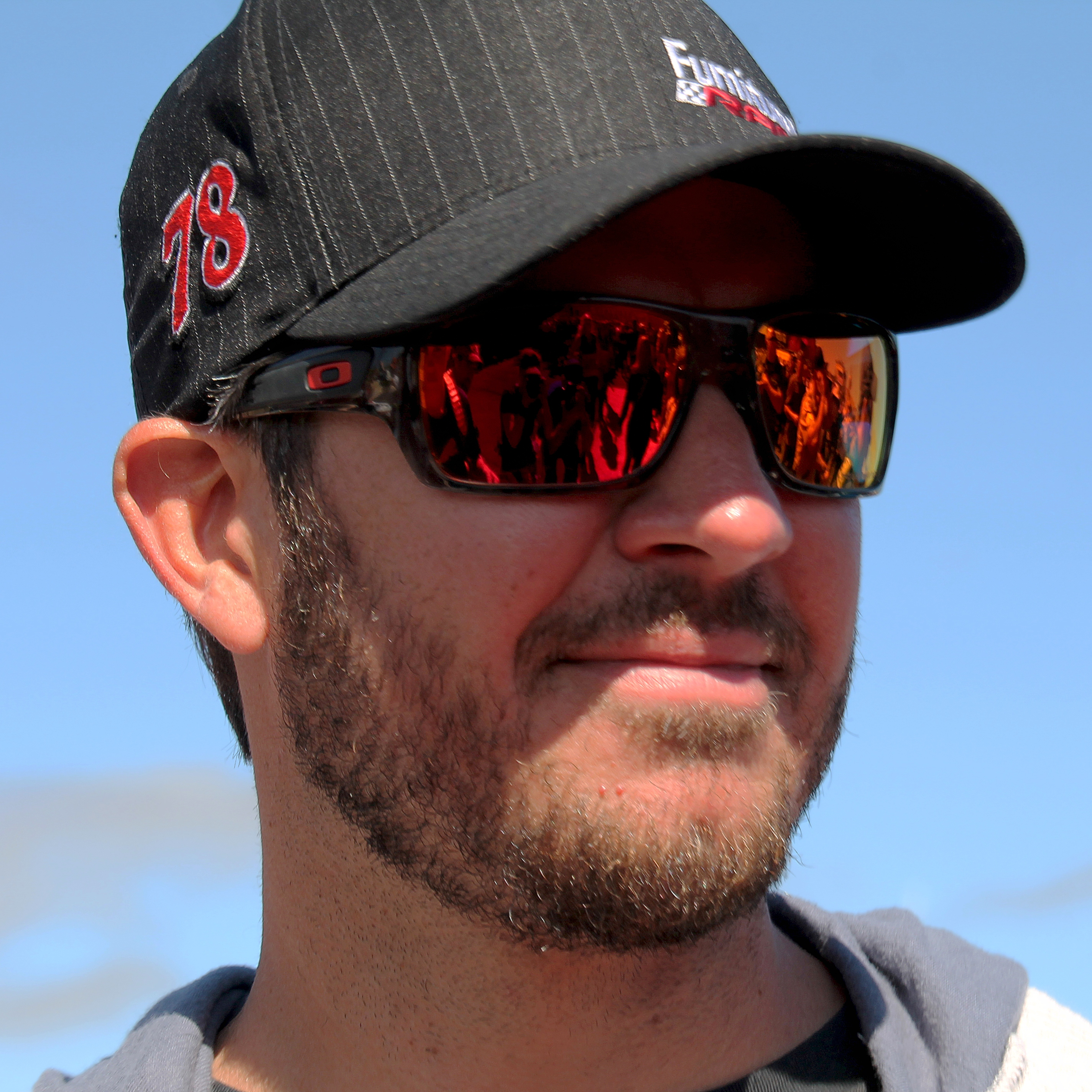
Martin Truex Jr. qualified on the pole position with a time of 28.077 seconds.

Martin Truex Jr. scored the pole for the race with a time of 28.077 and a speed of 192.328 mph (309.522 km/h). He said after qualifying that he "liked what I felt last year and I’ve been thinking about this race a lot since then. We had a really good car that day and thought we were going to go to victory lane and got beat on fuel mileage. Just excited for all my guys and for Bass Pro Shops, Tracker Boats, Furniture Row, Denver Mattress and everybody that works so hard on this deal – Toyota Racing, TRD – just awesome race cars. We had to work hard today, we were not that good in practice and made a lot of changes throughout this qualifying session. Hats off to my guys for some really good work and lucky to be with this group for sure.”

Joey Logano, who qualified second, said he "got a little bit tight landing in (Turn) 1 and then a little bit free off (the corner). It wasn't much. And then (Turns) 3 and 4, I actually thought was a pretty good corner. So I would say most of it was down in 1 and 2 – probably at landing and through the center is where I lost most of my momentum. It's not much. Half-a-tenth of a second doesn't take long."

“Being in the top four in every session there was really big for us,” Ricky Stenhouse Jr. said after qualifying third. “We’ve been fast at times in qualifying, but never put every round together and stayed that consistent, so I’m really proud of the team for the adjustments that they made throughout the qualifying session there. We just missed it a little bit, but we know where to go work on it to get it better. Now our job is to get it better on Saturday for a long 600 miles and make sure that we’ve got some adjustability in it.”

=== Qualifying results ===
Pos	No.	Driver	Team	Manufacturer	R1	R2	R3
1	78	Martin Truex Jr.	Furniture Row Racing	Toyota	28.383	28.229	28.077
2	22	Joey Logano	Team Penske	Ford	28.224	28.159	28.124
3	17	Ricky Stenhouse Jr.	Roush Fenway Racing	Ford	28.306	28.185	28.209
4	11	Denny Hamlin	Joe Gibbs Racing	Toyota	28.470	28.294	28.215
5	2	Brad Keselowski	Team Penske	Ford	28.345	28.222	28.277
6	16	Greg Biffle	Roush Fenway Racing	Ford	28.333	28.180	28.346
7	48	Jimmie Johnson	Hendrick Motorsports	Chevrolet	28.422	28.274	28.379
8	4	Kevin Harvick	Stewart–Haas Racing	Chevrolet	28.376	28.240	28.381
9	19	Carl Edwards	Joe Gibbs Racing	Toyota	28.473	28.378	28.443
10	6	Trevor Bayne	Roush Fenway Racing	Ford	28.546	28.280	28.483
11	27	Paul Menard	Richard Childress Racing	Chevrolet	28.382	28.285	28.547
12	24	Chase Elliott (R)	Hendrick Motorsports	Chevrolet	28.355	28.392	28.729
13	41	Kurt Busch	Stewart–Haas Racing	Chevrolet	28.245	28.404	
14	31	Ryan Newman	Richard Childress Racing	Chevrolet	28.475	28.432	
15	47	A. J. Allmendinger	JTG Daugherty Racing	Chevrolet	28.541	28.443	
16	18	Kyle Busch	Joe Gibbs Racing	Toyota	28.325	28.448	
17	13	Casey Mears	Germain Racing	Chevrolet	28.436	28.448	
18	21	Ryan Blaney (R)	Wood Brothers Racing	Ford	28.238	28.450	
19	10	Danica Patrick	Stewart–Haas Racing	Chevrolet	28.556	28.492	
20	43	Aric Almirola	Richard Petty Motorsports	Ford	28.326	28.530	
21	14	Tony Stewart	Stewart–Haas Racing	Chevrolet	28.504	28.543	
22	34	Chris Buescher (R)	Front Row Motorsports	Ford	28.581	28.621	
23	1	Jamie McMurray	Chip Ganassi Racing	Chevrolet	28.581	28.646	
24	42	Kyle Larson	Chip Ganassi Racing	Chevrolet	28.535	28.734	
25	88	Dale Earnhardt Jr.	Hendrick Motorsports	Chevrolet	28.594		
26	15	Clint Bowyer	HScott Motorsports	Chevrolet	28.623		
27	20	Matt Kenseth	Joe Gibbs Racing	Toyota	28.642		
28	3	Austin Dillon	Richard Childress Racing	Chevrolet	28.645		
29	5	Kasey Kahne	Hendrick Motorsports	Chevrolet	28.666		
30	44	Brian Scott (R)	Richard Petty Motorsports	Ford	28.721		
31	7	Regan Smith	Tommy Baldwin Racing	Chevrolet	28.803		
32	95	Michael McDowell	Circle Sport – Leavine Family Racing	Chevrolet	28.836		
33	38	Landon Cassill	Front Row Motorsports	Ford	28.846		
34	83	Matt DiBenedetto	BK Racing	Toyota	28.884		
35	23	David Ragan	BK Racing	Toyota	28.911		
36	98	Cole Whitt	Premium Motorsports	Chevrolet	29.097		
37	30	Josh Wise	The Motorsports Group	Chevrolet	29.479		
38	46	Michael Annett	HScott Motorsports	Chevrolet	29.494		
39	32	Jeffrey Earnhardt (R)	Go FAS Racing	Ford	29.881		
40	55	Reed Sorenson	Premium Motorsports	Chevrolet	30.095		
Official qualifying results

== Race ==
=== First half ===
==== Start ====
Under cloudy North Carolina skies, Martin Truex Jr. led the field to the green flag at 6:12 p.m. The first caution of the race flew on lap 26. This was a scheduled competition caution due to overnight rain. Ryan Blaney and Chase Elliott were tagged for speeding on pit road and restarted the race from the tail-end of the field.

The race restarted at lap 31. Truex hit pit road on lap 78 and handed the lead to Jimmie Johnson. He pitted the next lap and the lead cycled back to Truex.

==== Second quarter ====
The second caution of the race flew on lap 114 for a single-car spin in turn 2. Rounding the turn, Brian Scott got loose and spun down the track.

The race restarted on lap 121. David Ragan was tagged for a restart violation and was forced to serve a pass-through penalty. Truex pitted from the lead on lap 165 and handed the lead to Johnson. He pitted the next lap and handed the lead to Joey Logano, who pitted the following lap as well, with the lead cycling back to Truex. Ragan was tagged for an uncontrolled tire and was forced to serve a pass-through penalty.

=== Second half ===
==== Halfway ====
Reed Sorenson retired from the race due to clutch issues and finished 40th. The third caution of the race flew on lap 204 for a single-car wreck in turn 4. Rounding the turn, Jeffrey Earnhardt got loose and slammed the wall.

The race restarted on lap 210. During the green flag cycle of stops on lap 266, Logano was tagged for his crew being over the wall too soon and was forced to serve a pass-through penalty. Logano said after the race that his team, and others, are "trying to make pit stops so fast and you’re gonna push everything to the edge. I guess we jumped off the wall a little bit too soon. I haven’t seen it, but unfortunately, that kind of made us make a green flag pit stop, which is really hard to overcome. Overall, we were able to get our lap back by racing up there, which was kind of cool. We didn’t have to take a lucky dog or any of that. We actually raced back to the lead lap, but we lost the balance a little bit on the last run and I couldn’t make much time once we got going."

Truex pitted on lap 299 and handed the lead to Paul Menard. He pitted on lap 302 and the lead cycled back to Truex. Carl Edwards was tagged for speeding and was forced to serve a pass-through penalty. He was tagged for speeding again while serving the penalty and was forced to serve a stop and go penalty.

==== Fourth quarter ====
With 85 laps to go, Truex began running into lapped traffic. This allowed Johnson to pull up to within three-tenths of a second of him. He was unable to get past Truex and lost second to Kevin Harvick. Debris on the backstretch brought out the fourth caution of the race with 61 laps to go, within the fuel window allowing the entire field to reach the scheduled distance on one more full tank of fuel. In the ensuing caution, Aric Almirola was tagged for speeding on pit road and restarted the race from the tail-end of the field.

The race restarted with 56 laps to go. Johnson briefly took the lead from Truex after the restart, but Truex quickly reclaimed the lead and then led the remainder of the race, ultimately leading a race-record 392 of the 400 laps en route to the victory. At 3 hours, 44 minutes, and 8 seconds, with an average speed of 160.655 miles per hour (258.549 km/h), it set an all-time record for the fastest 600 mile race.

== Post-race ==
=== Driver comments ===
Truex said afterwards that he was "proud of my team, everybody that made this possible, that believed in me, gave me this opportunity. Cole Pearn (crew chief), Jazzy (team engineer Jeff Curtis), my guys are something special. I want to thank all of them. This is a big day. Got the troops on the cars, this is a special weekend. It’s really neat to bring that name home to Victory Lane. Just a lot of emotion right now. Not really sure it’s sunk in yet. Just an amazing day, an amazing weekend for all of us. It’s a weekend you dream about."

After a runner-up finish, Harvick said he "ran 10th all day. So I’m just really, really happy. When you’re able to take a 10th-place car – at best – and drive it 450 miles and then make huge gains (the rest of the way). At the end of the race we obviously didn’t have the best car. Those guys (Truex’s Furniture Row Racing team) have had some fast cars this year and tonight definitely had the dominant car. Early on we were just really bad. Tight coming into corners and loose coming out. Nothing seemed to be working and then were just stepped back and swung for the fences. We were able to pass with our car once we got our handling together. The cars were already sliding around a fair amount all day.”

Johnson said after finishing third that he was "so proud of the effort we put in tonight. This is the best car I’ve had in Charlotte for a long time. It just shows you how good that No. 78 was and the No. 4 got a little bit better than us at the end. I thought we had a chance at them a few times, a couple of times on the long run we would get close. A couple times on the restarts we would get close, but all-in-all a very strong performance for this Lowe’s Chevrolet. Very proud of the team work and the support that we have from all the employees at Lowe’s. Just came up a little short today.” He also said that Truex "was very impressive. I’m happy for Martin and the team, those guys have worked awful hard to get where they’re at.”

== Race results ==
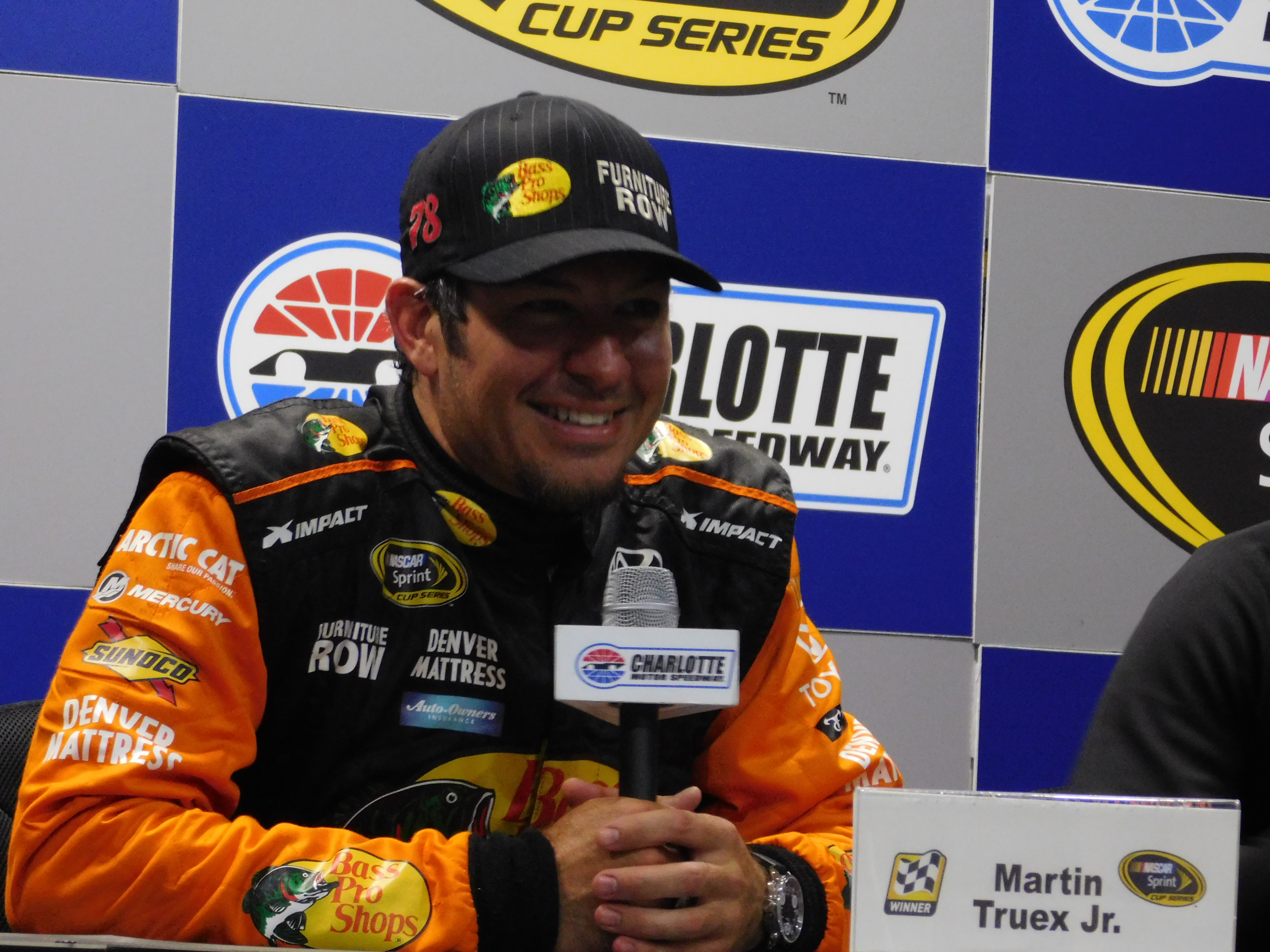
Martin Truex Jr. won the race from the pole

Pos	No.	Driver	Team	Manufacturer	Laps	Points
1	78	Martin Truex Jr.	Furniture Row Racing	Toyota	400	45
2	4	Kevin Harvick	Stewart–Haas Racing	Chevrolet	400	39
3	48	Jimmie Johnson	Hendrick Motorsports	Chevrolet	400	39
4	11	Denny Hamlin	Joe Gibbs Racing	Toyota	400	37
5	2	Brad Keselowski	Team Penske	Ford	400	36
6	41	Kurt Busch	Stewart–Haas Racing	Chevrolet	400	35
7	20	Matt Kenseth	Joe Gibbs Racing	Toyota	400	34
8	24	Chase Elliott (R)	Hendrick Motorsports	Chevrolet	400	33
9	22	Joey Logano	Team Penske	Ford	400	33
10	31	Ryan Newman	Richard Childress Racing	Chevrolet	400	31
11	16	Greg Biffle	Roush Fenway Racing	Ford	400	30
12	3	Austin Dillon	Richard Childress Racing	Chevrolet	400	29
13	42	Kyle Larson	Chip Ganassi Racing	Chevrolet	400	28
14	88	Dale Earnhardt Jr.	Hendrick Motorsports	Chevrolet	400	27
15	17	Ricky Stenhouse Jr.	Roush Fenway Racing	Ford	400	26
16	47	A. J. Allmendinger	JTG Daugherty Racing	Chevrolet	399	25
17	27	Paul Menard	Richard Childress Racing	Chevrolet	399	25
18	19	Carl Edwards	Joe Gibbs Racing	Toyota	399	23
19	1	Jamie McMurray	Chip Ganassi Racing	Chevrolet	399	22
20	21	Ryan Blaney (R)	Wood Brothers Racing	Ford	397	21
21	10	Danica Patrick	Stewart–Haas Racing	Chevrolet	396	20
22	5	Kasey Kahne	Hendrick Motorsports	Chevrolet	395	19
23	15	Clint Bowyer	HScott Motorsports	Chevrolet	395	18
24	14	Tony Stewart	Stewart–Haas Racing	Chevrolet	395	17
25	6	Trevor Bayne	Roush Fenway Racing	Ford	395	16
26	43	Aric Almirola	Richard Petty Motorsports	Ford	395	15
27	38	Landon Cassill	Front Row Motorsports	Ford	395	14
28	7	Regan Smith	Tommy Baldwin Racing	Chevrolet	395	13
29	44	Brian Scott (R)	Richard Petty Motorsports	Ford	394	12
30	13	Casey Mears	Germain Racing	Chevrolet	394	11
31	23	David Ragan	BK Racing	Toyota	393	10
32	83	Matt DiBenedetto	BK Racing	Toyota	393	9
33	18	Kyle Busch	Joe Gibbs Racing	Toyota	392	8
34	95	Michael McDowell	Circle Sport – Leavine Family Racing	Chevrolet	391	7
35	98	Cole Whitt	Premium Motorsports	Chevrolet	391	6
36	46	Michael Annett	HScott Motorsports	Chevrolet	390	5
37	34	Chris Buescher (R)	Front Row Motorsports	Ford	388	4
38	30	Josh Wise	The Motorsports Group	Chevrolet	387	3
39	32	Jeffrey Earnhardt (R)	Go FAS Racing	Ford	382	2
40	55	Reed Sorenson	Premium Motorsports	Chevrolet	200	1
Official race results

=== Race summary ===
- Lead changes: 9 among 4 different drivers
- Cautions/laps: 4 for 19
- Red flags: 0
- Time of race: 3 hours, 44 minutes and 5 seconds
- Average speed: 160.655 miles per hour (258.549 km/h)

== Media ==
=== Television ===
Fox Sports televised the race in the United States for the sixteenth consecutive year. Mike Joy was the lap-by-lap announcer, while three-time Coca-Cola 600 winner, Jeff Gordon and five-time race winner Darrell Waltrip were the color commentators. Jamie Little, Chris Neville, Vince Welch and Matt Yocum reported from pit lane during the race.

Fox Television
Booth announcers	Pit reporters
Lap-by-lap: Mike Joy; Color-commentator: Jeff Gordon; Color commentator: Darrell Waltrip	Jamie Little; Chris Neville; Vince Welch; Matt Yocum

=== Radio ===
Radio coverage of the race was broadcast by the Performance Racing Network (PRN), and was simulcasted on Sirius XM NASCAR Radio. Doug Rice, Mark Garrow and Wendy Venturini called the race in the booth when the field raced through the quad-oval. Rob Albright reported the race from a billboard in turn 2 when the field was racing through turns 1 and 2 and halfway down the backstretch. Pat Patterson called the race from a billboard outside of turn 3 when the field raced through the other half of the backstretch and through turns 3 and 4. Brad Gillie, Brett McMillan, Jim Noble and Steve Richards were the pit reporters during the broadcast.

PRN Radio
Booth announcers	Turn announcers	Pit reporters
Lead announcer: Doug Rice; Announcer: Mark Garrow; Announcer: Wendy Venturini	Turns 1 & 2: Rob Albright; Turns 3 & 4: Pat Patterson	Brad Gillie; Brett McMilan; Jim Noble; Steve Richards

== Standings after the race ==
Drivers' Championship standings
	Pos	Driver	Points
	1	Kevin Harvick	457
1	2	Kurt Busch	421 (–36)
2	3	Jimmie Johnson	409 (–48)
2	4	Kyle Busch	405 (–52)
1	5	Carl Edwards	404 (–53)
	6	Brad Keselowski	404 (–53)
2	7	Martin Truex Jr.	381 (–76)
1	8	Chase Elliott (R)	374 (–83)
1	9	Joey Logano	373 (–84)
2	10	Matt Kenseth	347 (–110)
2	11	Denny Hamlin	345 (–112)
2	12	Austin Dillon	344 (–113)
2	13	Dale Earnhardt Jr.	341 (–116)
	14	Jamie McMurray	318 (–139)
	15	Ryan Blaney (R)	309 (–148)
1	16	Ryan Newman	309 (–148)
Official driver's standings

Manufacturers' Championship standings
Pos	Manufacturer	Points
1	Toyota	553
2	Chevrolet	522 (–31)
3	Ford	476 (–77)
Official manufacturers' standings

- Note: Only the first 16 positions are included for the driver standings.
  . – Driver has clinched a Chase position.

Previous race: 2016 AAA 400 Drive for Autism	Sprint Cup Series; 2016 season	Next race: 2016 Axalta "We Paint Winners" 400
