= 2016 Go Bowling 400 =

Race details
- Race 11 of 36 in the 2016 NASCAR Sprint Cup Series
- Date: May 7, 2016
- Location: Kansas Speedway in Kansas City, Kansas
- Course: Permanent racing facility
- Course length: 1.5 miles (2.4 km)
- Distance: 267 laps, 400.5 mi (644.542 km)
- Weather: Cloudy with the chance of Isolated Showers
- Average speed: 141.909 miles per hour (228.380 km/h)

Pole position
| Driver | Martin Truex Jr. | Furniture Row Racing |
- Time: 28.284

Most laps led
| Driver | Martin Truex Jr. | Furniture Row Racing |
- Laps: 172

Winner
| No. 18 | Kyle Busch | Joe Gibbs Racing |

Television in the United States
- Network: Fox Sports 1
- Announcers: Mike Joy, Jeff Gordon and Darrell Waltrip
- Nielsen ratings: 1.8 (Overnight); 3.1 million viewers

Radio in the United States
- Radio: MRN
- Booth announcers: Joe Moore, Jeff Striegle and Rusty Wallace
- Turn announcers: Dave Moody (1 & 2) and Mike Bagley (3 & 4)

The 2016 Go Bowling 400 was a NASCAR Sprint Cup Series race held on May 7, 2016, at Kansas Speedway in Kansas City, Kansas. Contested over 267 laps on the 1.5 mile (2.4 km) asphalt speedway, it was the 11th race of the 2016 NASCAR Sprint Cup season, The race had 16 lead changes among different drivers and six cautions for 30 laps.

== Report ==
=== Background ===
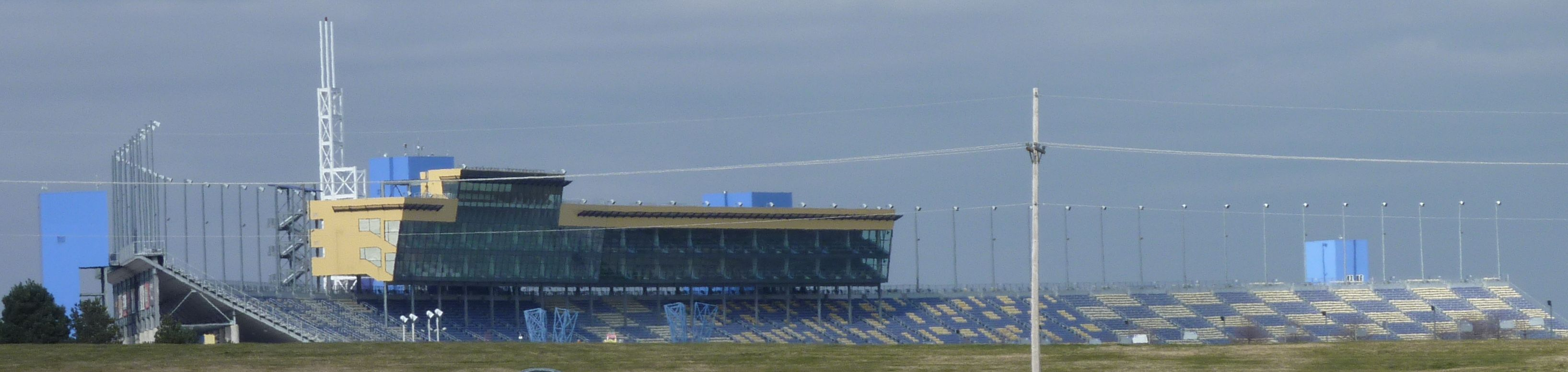
Kansas Speedway, the track where the race was held.

Kansas Speedway is a 1.5-mile (2.4 km) tri-oval race track in Kansas City, Kansas. Entering the race, Kevin Harvick leads the points with 351, while Kyle Busch is 9 points back, Carl Edwards is 14 points back, Jimmie Johnson is 22 points back, and Joey Logano is 35 points back.

=== Entry list ===
The entry list for the Go Bowling 400 was released on Monday, May 2 at 9:56 a.m. Eastern time. Forty cars are entered for the race.

| No. | Driver | Team | Manufacturer |
|---|---|---|---|
| 1 | Jamie McMurray | Chip Ganassi Racing | Chevrolet |
| 2 | Brad Keselowski | Team Penske | Ford |
| 3 | Austin Dillon | Richard Childress Racing | Chevrolet |
| 4 | Kevin Harvick | Stewart–Haas Racing | Chevrolet |
| 5 | Kasey Kahne | Hendrick Motorsports | Chevrolet |
| 6 | Trevor Bayne | Roush Fenway Racing | Ford |
| 7 | Regan Smith | Tommy Baldwin Racing | Chevrolet |
| 10 | Danica Patrick | Stewart–Haas Racing | Chevrolet |
| 11 | Denny Hamlin | Joe Gibbs Racing | Toyota |
| 13 | Casey Mears | Germain Racing | Chevrolet |
| 14 | Tony Stewart | Stewart–Haas Racing | Chevrolet |
| 15 | Clint Bowyer | HScott Motorsports | Chevrolet |
| 16 | Greg Biffle | Roush Fenway Racing | Ford |
| 17 | Ricky Stenhouse Jr. | Roush Fenway Racing | Ford |
| 18 | Kyle Busch | Joe Gibbs Racing | Toyota |
| 19 | Carl Edwards | Joe Gibbs Racing | Toyota |
| 20 | Matt Kenseth | Joe Gibbs Racing | Toyota |
| 21 | Ryan Blaney (R) | Wood Brothers Racing | Ford |
| 22 | Joey Logano | Team Penske | Ford |
| 23 | David Ragan | BK Racing | Toyota |
| 24 | Chase Elliott (R) | Hendrick Motorsports | Chevrolet |
| 27 | Paul Menard | Richard Childress Racing | Chevrolet |
| 30 | Josh Wise | The Motorsports Group | Chevrolet |
| 31 | Ryan Newman | Richard Childress Racing | Chevrolet |
| 32 | Joey Gase (i) | Go FAS Racing | Ford |
| 34 | Chris Buescher (R) | Front Row Motorsports | Ford |
| 38 | Landon Cassill | Front Row Motorsports | Ford |
| 41 | Kurt Busch | Stewart–Haas Racing | Chevrolet |
| 42 | Kyle Larson | Chip Ganassi Racing | Chevrolet |
| 43 | Aric Almirola | Richard Petty Motorsports | Ford |
| 44 | Brian Scott (R) | Richard Petty Motorsports | Ford |
| 46 | Michael Annett | HScott Motorsports | Chevrolet |
| 47 | A. J. Allmendinger | JTG Daugherty Racing | Chevrolet |
| 48 | Jimmie Johnson | Hendrick Motorsports | Chevrolet |
| 55 | Reed Sorenson | Premium Motorsports | Chevrolet |
| 78 | Martin Truex Jr. | Furniture Row Racing | Toyota |
| 83 | Matt DiBenedetto | BK Racing | Toyota |
| 88 | Dale Earnhardt Jr. | Hendrick Motorsports | Chevrolet |
| 95 | Michael McDowell | Circle Sport – Leavine Family Racing | Chevrolet |
| 98 | Cole Whitt | Premium Motorsports | Chevrolet |
Official entry list

== Practice ==
=== First practice ===
Kurt Busch was the fastest in the first practice session with a time of 29.049 and a speed of 185.893 mph (299.166 km/h).

| Pos | No. | Driver | Team | Manufacturer | Time | Speed |
|---|---|---|---|---|---|---|
| 1 | 41 | Kurt Busch | Stewart–Haas Racing | Chevrolet | 29.049 | 185.093 |
| 2 | 78 | Martin Truex Jr. | Furniture Row Racing | Toyota | 29.114 | 185.479 |
| 3 | 19 | Carl Edwards | Joe Gibbs Racing | Toyota | 29.186 | 185.020 |
First Practice Results

=== Final practice ===
Martin Truex Jr. was the fastest in the final practice session with a time of 28.770 and a speed of 187.696 mph (302.067 km/h). Jimmie Johnson suffered an engine issue similar to what happened to Kasey Kahne at Phoenix in March. The gremlins were remedied and he returned to the track.

| Pos | No. | Driver | Team | Manufacturer | Time | Speed |
|---|---|---|---|---|---|---|
| 1 | 78 | Martin Truex Jr. | Furniture Row Racing | Toyota | 28.770 | 187.696 |
| 2 | 20 | Matt Kenseth | Joe Gibbs Racing | Toyota | 28.782 | 187.617 |
| 3 | 11 | Denny Hamlin | Joe Gibbs Racing | Toyota | 28.822 | 187.357 |
Final Practice Results

== Qualifying ==
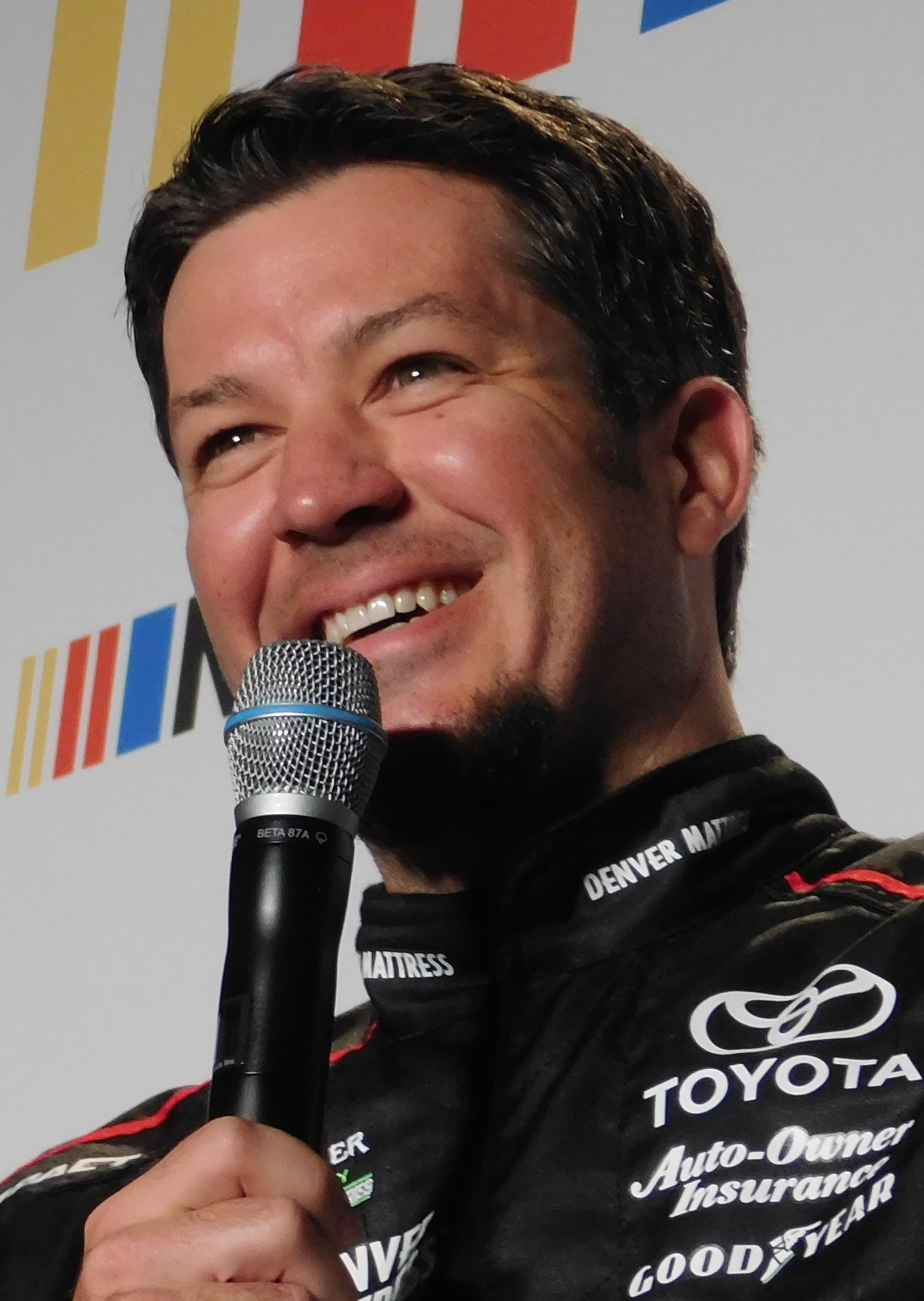
Martin Truex Jr. scored the pole position.

Martin Truex Jr. scored the pole for the race with a time of 28.284 and a speed of 190.921 mph (307.258 km/h). Truex said afterwards that his team "had speed here this weekend for sure and feel pretty good about this car in race trim as too. We feel like we made some mistakes throughout qualifying and it took us a while to figure out this three round deal. Things have really been going well for us and clicking well. I love this race track. We’ve really been able to perform well here.”

Matt Kenseth, who qualified second, said that the "Toyota's had a lot of speed in them" and that he "couldn’t get that last lap I wanted. We got off-balance a little bit at the end. Martin was able to get it. We came up a little short.”

Kurt Busch, who qualified fourth, said he felt good about his car "because we made three spring changes going into that qualifying run. Those are things we wanted to try for the race, and we ran out of practice time to do so. It's nice that it turned out positive and the pace in qualifying is fast, yes, but the race will be at nightfall whereas we practiced in the daytime. This speed should be right in the middle of what we just ran and what changes we made. I think we're cooking up the right batch (for the race)."

=== Qualifying results ===
| Pos | No. | Driver | Team | Manufacturer | R1 | R2 | R3 |
|---|---|---|---|---|---|---|---|
| 1 | 78 | Martin Truex Jr. | Furniture Row Racing | Toyota | 28.451 | 28.433 | 28.284 |
| 2 | 20 | Matt Kenseth | Joe Gibbs Racing | Toyota | 28.416 | 28.315 | 28.337 |
| 3 | 11 | Denny Hamlin | Joe Gibbs Racing | Toyota | 28.646 | 28.399 | 28.361 |
| 4 | 41 | Kurt Busch | Stewart–Haas Racing | Chevrolet | 28.518 | 28.423 | 28.401 |
| 5 | 2 | Brad Keselowski | Team Penske | Ford | 28.692 | 28.547 | 28.435 |
| 6 | 18 | Kyle Busch | Joe Gibbs Racing | Toyota | 28.581 | 28.514 | 28.440 |
| 7 | 21 | Ryan Blaney (R) | Wood Brothers Racing | Ford | 28.734 | 28.485 | 28.470 |
| 8 | 31 | Ryan Newman | Richard Childress Racing | Chevrolet | 28.653 | 28.549 | 28.488 |
| 9 | 17 | Ricky Stenhouse Jr. | Roush Fenway Racing | Ford | 28.626 | 28.506 | 28.532 |
| 10 | 6 | Trevor Bayne | Roush Fenway Racing | Ford | 28.675 | 28.548 | 28.628 |
| 11 | 27 | Paul Menard | Richard Childress Racing | Chevrolet | 28.766 | 28.558 | 28.706 |
| 12 | 19 | Carl Edwards | Joe Gibbs Racing | Toyota | 28.569 | 28.510 | 28.730 |
| 13 | 24 | Chase Elliott (R) | Hendrick Motorsports | Chevrolet | 28.764 | 28.571 | |
| 14 | 22 | Joey Logano | Team Penske | Ford | 28.603 | 28.574 | |
| 15 | 48 | Jimmie Johnson | Hendrick Motorsports | Chevrolet | 28.596 | 28.614 | |
| 16 | 14 | Tony Stewart | Stewart–Haas Racing | Chevrolet | 28.795 | 28.634 | |
| 17 | 3 | Austin Dillon | Richard Childress Racing | Chevrolet | 28.551 | 28.637 | |
| 18 | 42 | Kyle Larson | Chip Ganassi Racing | Chevrolet | 28.741 | 28.641 | |
| 19 | 43 | Aric Almirola | Richard Petty Motorsports | Ford | 28.616 | 28.664 | |
| 20 | 16 | Greg Biffle | Roush Fenway Racing | Ford | 28.709 | 28.715 | |
| 21 | 1 | Jamie McMurray | Chip Ganassi Racing | Chevrolet | 28.782 | 28.739 | |
| 22 | 88 | Dale Earnhardt Jr. | Hendrick Motorsports | Chevrolet | 28.757 | 28.875 | |
| 23 | 10 | Danica Patrick | Stewart–Haas Racing | Chevrolet | 28.701 | 28.906 | |
| 24 | 83 | Matt DiBenedetto | BK Racing | Toyota | 28.779 | 28.954 | |
| 25 | 34 | Chris Buescher (R) | Front Row Motorsports | Ford | 28.811 | | |
| 26 | 4 | Kevin Harvick | Stewart–Haas Racing | Chevrolet | 28.853 | | |
| 27 | 5 | Kasey Kahne | Hendrick Motorsports | Chevrolet | 28.854 | | |
| 28 | 44 | Brian Scott (R) | Richard Petty Motorsports | Ford | 28.866 | | |
| 29 | 47 | A. J. Allmendinger | JTG Daugherty Racing | Chevrolet | 28.925 | | |
| 30 | 95 | Michael McDowell | Circle Sport – Leavine Family Racing | Chevrolet | 28.927 | | |
| 31 | 13 | Casey Mears | Germain Racing | Chevrolet | 28.933 | | |
| 32 | 7 | Regan Smith | Tommy Baldwin Racing | Chevrolet | 28.972 | | |
| 33 | 15 | Clint Bowyer | HScott Motorsports | Chevrolet | 28.987 | | |
| 34 | 23 | David Ragan | BK Racing | Toyota | 29.112 | | |
| 35 | 38 | Landon Cassill | Front Row Motorsports | Ford | 29.199 | | |
| 36 | 30 | Josh Wise | The Motorsports Group | Chevrolet | 29.419 | | |
| 37 | 98 | Cole Whitt | Premium Motorsports | Chevrolet | 29.502 | | |
| 38 | 32 | Joey Gase (i) | Go FAS Racing | Ford | 29.678 | | |
| 39 | 46 | Michael Annett | HScott Motorsports | Chevrolet | 30.263 | | |
| 40 | 55 | Reed Sorenson | Premium Motorsports | Chevrolet | 30.426 | | |

== Race ==
=== First half ===
==== Start ====
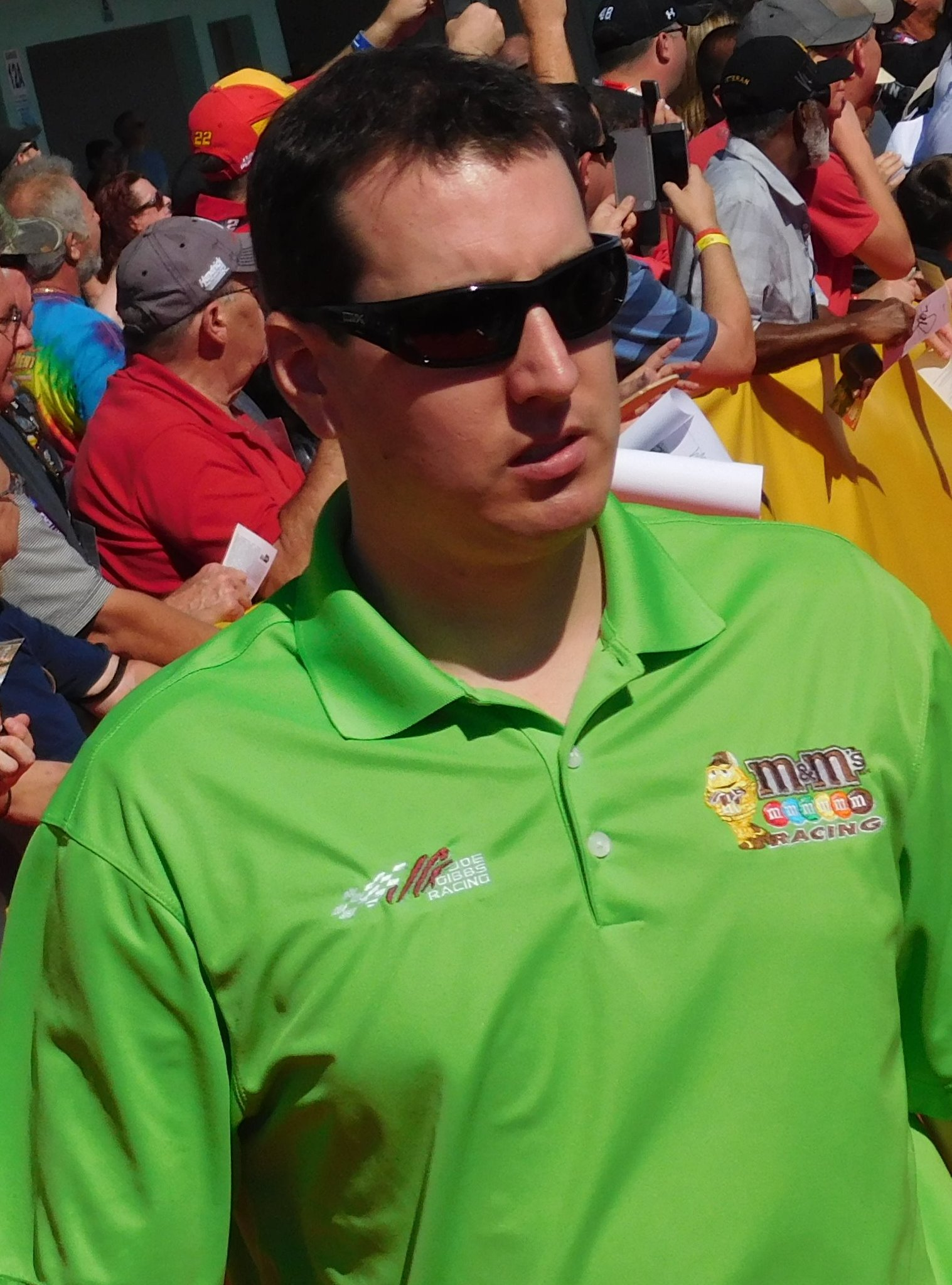
Kyle Busch won the race.

Under clear Kansas skies, Martin Truex Jr. led the field to the green flag at 7:48 p.m. After 15 laps, he pulled to a three-second lead over Matt Kenseth. Debris in turn 4 brought out the first caution of the race on lap 24. Kyle Busch exited pit road with the race lead. Dale Earnhardt Jr. and Regan Smith were tagged for speeding on pit road and restarted the race from the tail-end of the field.

The race restarted on lap 28. Jamie McMurray was black-flagged on lap 30 after NASCAR deemed his crew made "unapproved adjustments" to the body of the car during his pit stop. Matt McCall, McMurray's crew chief, said he thought NASCAR "called us back in for body modification or something. The Jackman hit the door when he went for the tire, so I don’t know. It’s interesting to me how they enforce stuff.” By lap 40, Busch held a one-second lead over Kurt Busch. The second caution of the race flew on lap 56 for Matt DiBenedetto brushing the wall exiting turn 4. Truex exited pit road with the race lead.

==== Second quarter ====
The race restarted on lap 61. Carl Edwards attempted to pit because of a flat tire on lap 82, but was carrying too much speed, overshot the entrance and had to limp back around. The third caution of the race flew on lap 103 for a single-car wreck in turn 2. Rounding the turn, Paul Menard got loose and rear-ended the wall. He would go on to finish 40th. Denny Hamlin was tagged for speeding on pit road and restarted the race from the tail-end of the field.

The race restarted on lap 109. A number of cars began hitting pit road on lap 155. Truex pitted on lap 158 and handed the lead to Joey Logano. He pitted the next lap and handed the lead to Clint Bowyer. He pitted the next lap and handed the lead to Danica Patrick. Truex, on fresher tires, ran down and passed Patrick in turn 3 to retake the lead on lap 163.

=== Second half ===
==== Halfway ====
Debris on the backstretch brought out the fourth caution of the race with 99 laps to go. Hamlin was tagged for speeding on pit road and restarted the race from the tail-end of the field.

The race restarted with 94 laps to go. A number of drivers began pitting with 57 laps to go. Truex hit pit road with 54 laps to go and handed the lead to Matt Kenseth. Truex came back down pit road because of a loose right-front wheel. The wheel was on crooked because of a jammed bracket behind the wheel. After the race, Truex said he "couldn’t believe it. I went around Turns 1 and 2 and I was like ‘Wheel loose.’ I kept telling myself that maybe it's not me, maybe it's just shaking because it has tape on it or something stupid. It was loose and I knew it right away. Frustrating, but that's how it goes.” Kenseth pitted with 53 laps to go and handed the lead to Logano. He pitted with 52 laps to go and handed the lead to Brad Keselowski. He pitted with 50 laps to go and handed the lead to Tony Stewart. Kyle Busch passed entering turn 3 to retake the lead with 36 laps to go.

==== Fourth quarter ====
The fifth caution of the race flew with 34 laps to go after Ricky Stenhouse Jr. rode the wall through turns 3 and 4. Jimmie Johnson was tagged for speeding on pit road and restart the race from the tail-end of the field.

The race restarted with 28 laps to go. The sixth caution of the race flew with 27 to go for a multi-car wreck in turn 3. Threading the needle between Keselowski and Kyle Larson, Hamlin got loose and spun out. Logano, with nowhere to go, t-boned the No. 11 car. Hamlin said afterwards that he "and the No. 2 got loose at the same time, I don’t think there was any contact, but the No. 42 was real close to me on the outside. I was driving in really deep there to try and clear him. Didn’t get him cleared and I knew if I didn’t get him clear then I would’ve put myself in a bad spot. I was just going for it. We’ve got a win and it’s win or nothing with this type of format, so why not go in there and take a chance? Unfortunately, it didn’t work.” Logano said it looked from his point that "the 2 got loose and then the 11 got loose. I was hoping the 11 would come down the hill and when you’re in the smoke you can’t see anything. I hit the wall, so I knew where that was and I just kept riding and riding and hoping the 11 would come down the hill because I couldn’t see and he stayed up there and I got him right in the door. It’s unfortunate...It’s just racing. Things happen sometimes.”

The race restarted with 19 laps to go. Busch held off a late charge by Harvick to score the victory.

== Post-race ==
=== Driver comments ===
Busch said afterwards that winning at Kansas was "pretty big – man, there’s been a lot of rough days here at Kansas, that’s for sure. A lot of good ones too, but I just can’t say enough about this team and everyone on this M&M’s Camry. This thing was awesome tonight. At the beginning and middle part of the race we weren’t great, but Adam Stevens (crew chief) and the guys, they just kept working on it.”

Following his second-place finish, Harvick said his car towards the end "got tight, I hit a big piece of debris down there about six or seven laps into the run. From that point on I just got really tight...We overhauled this thing this morning to try to get it close. They did a great job.”

After finishing third, Kurt Busch said his team "battled hard. I was trying to find all the different lines on the track to find speed. We did a lot of things good and to win you’ve got to be great. It’s a great second and third place finish. We always want to win and we have been doing really good with this Tony Gibson (crew chief) led team.”

== Race results ==
| Pos | No. | Driver | Team | Manufacturer | Laps | Points |
|---|---|---|---|---|---|---|
| 1 | 18 | Kyle Busch | Joe Gibbs Racing | Toyota | 267 | 44 |
| 2 | 4 | Kevin Harvick | Stewart–Haas Racing | Chevrolet | 267 | 39 |
| 3 | 41 | Kurt Busch | Stewart–Haas Racing | Chevrolet | 267 | 38 |
| 4 | 20 | Matt Kenseth | Joe Gibbs Racing | Toyota | 267 | 38 |
| 5 | 21 | Ryan Blaney (R) | Wood Brothers Racing | Ford | 267 | 36 |
| 6 | 3 | Austin Dillon | Richard Childress Racing | Chevrolet | 267 | 35 |
| 7 | 31 | Ryan Newman | Richard Childress Racing | Chevrolet | 267 | 34 |
| 8 | 47 | A. J. Allmendinger | JTG Daugherty Racing | Chevrolet | 267 | 33 |
| 9 | 24 | Chase Elliott (R) | Hendrick Motorsports | Chevrolet | 267 | 32 |
| 10 | 2 | Brad Keselowski | Team Penske | Ford | 267 | 32 |
| 11 | 19 | Carl Edwards | Joe Gibbs Racing | Toyota | 267 | 30 |
| 12 | 14 | Tony Stewart | Stewart–Haas Racing | Chevrolet | 267 | 30 |
| 13 | 17 | Ricky Stenhouse Jr. | Roush Fenway Racing | Ford | 267 | 28 |
| 14 | 78 | Martin Truex Jr. | Furniture Row Racing | Toyota | 267 | 29 |
| 15 | 88 | Dale Earnhardt Jr. | Hendrick Motorsports | Chevrolet | 267 | 26 |
| 16 | 5 | Kasey Kahne | Hendrick Motorsports | Chevrolet | 267 | 25 |
| 17 | 48 | Jimmie Johnson | Hendrick Motorsports | Chevrolet | 267 | 24 |
| 18 | 43 | Aric Almirola | Richard Petty Motorsports | Ford | 265 | 23 |
| 19 | 15 | Clint Bowyer | HScott Motorsports | Chevrolet | 265 | 22 |
| 20 | 10 | Danica Patrick | Stewart–Haas Racing | Chevrolet | 265 | 22 |
| 21 | 13 | Casey Mears | Germain Racing | Chevrolet | 265 | 20 |
| 22 | 44 | Brian Scott (R) | Richard Petty Motorsports | Ford | 265 | 19 |
| 23 | 7 | Regan Smith | Tommy Baldwin Racing | Chevrolet | 265 | 19 |
| 24 | 34 | Chris Buescher (R) | Front Row Motorsports | Ford | 265 | 17 |
| 25 | 6 | Trevor Bayne | Roush Fenway Racing | Ford | 264 | 16 |
| 26 | 1 | Jamie McMurray | Chip Ganassi Racing | Chevrolet | 264 | 15 |
| 27 | 16 | Greg Biffle | Roush Fenway Racing | Ford | 264 | 14 |
| 28 | 95 | Michael McDowell | Circle Sport – Leavine Family Racing | Chevrolet | 264 | 13 |
| 29 | 23 | David Ragan | BK Racing | Toyota | 264 | 13 |
| 30 | 83 | Matt DiBenedetto | BK Racing | Toyota | 264 | 12 |
| 31 | 38 | Landon Cassill | Front Row Motorsports | Ford | 264 | 10 |
| 32 | 46 | Michael Annett | HScott Motorsports | Chevrolet | 260 | 9 |
| 33 | 55 | Reed Sorenson | Premium Motorsports | Chevrolet | 257 | 8 |
| 34 | 32 | Joey Gase (i) | Go FAS Racing | Ford | 257 | 0 |
| 35 | 42 | Kyle Larson | Chip Ganassi Racing | Chevrolet | 252 | 6 |
| 36 | 30 | Josh Wise | The Motorsports Group | Chevrolet | 245 | 5 |
| 37 | 11 | Denny Hamlin | Joe Gibbs Racing | Toyota | 240 | 4 |
| 38 | 22 | Joey Logano | Team Penske | Ford | 240 | 4 |
| 39 | 98 | Cole Whitt | Premium Motorsports | Chevrolet | 212 | 2 |
| 40 | 27 | Paul Menard | Richard Childress Racing | Chevrolet | 129 | 1 |
Official race results

=== Race summary ===
- Lead changes: 16 among different drivers
- Cautions/Laps: 6 for 30
- Red flags: 0
- Time of race: 2 hours, 49 minutes and 20 seconds
- Average speed: 141.909 miles per hour (228.380 km/h)

== Media ==
=== Television ===
Fox Sports covered their sixth race at the Kansas Speedway. Mike Joy, three-time Kansas winner Jeff Gordon and Darrell Waltrip had the call in the booth for the race. Jamie Little, Vince Welch and Matt Yocum handled the action on pit road for the television side.

Fox Sports 1 Television
| Booth announcers | Pit reporters |
|---|---|
| Lap-by-lap: Mike Joy; Color-commentator: Jeff Gordon; Color commentator: Darrell Waltrip | Jamie Little; Vince Welch; Matt Yocum |

=== Radio ===
MRN had the radio call for the race which will also be simulcasted on Sirius XM NASCAR Radio. Joe Moore, Jeff Striegle and Rusty Wallace called the race in the booth when the field raced through the tri-oval. Dave Moody covered the race from the Sunoco spotters stand outside turn 2 when the field raced through turns 1 and 2. Mike Bagley called the race from a platform inside the backstretch when the field raced down the backstretch. Kyle Rickey covered the race from the Sunoco spotters stand outside turn 4 when the field raced through turns 3 and 4. Alex Hayden, Winston Kelley and Steve Post worked pit road for the radio side.

MRN Radio
| Booth announcers | Turn announcers | Pit reporters |
|---|---|---|
| Lead announcer: Joe Moore; Announcer: Jeff Striegle; Announcer: Rusty Wallace | Turns 1 & 2: Dave Moody; Turns 3 & 4: Mike Bagley | Alex Hayden; Winston Kelley; Steve Post |

== Standings after the race ==
Drivers' Championship standings

| | Pos | Driver | Points |
|---|---|---|---|
| | 1 | Kevin Harvick | 390 |
| | 2 | Kyle Busch | 386 (–4) |
| | 3 | Carl Edwards | 367 (–23) |
| | 4 | Jimmie Johnson | 353 (–37) |
| 1 | 5 | Kurt Busch | 350 (–40) |
| 1 | 6 | Brad Keselowski | 332 (–58) |
| 2 | 7 | Joey Logano | 320 (–70) |
| 2 | 8 | Austin Dillon | 307 (–83) |
| 1 | 9 | Dale Earnhardt Jr. | 305 (–85) |
| 1 | 10 | Martin Truex Jr. | 303 (–87) |
| | 11 | Chase Elliott (R) | 303 (–87) |
| 1 | 12 | Jamie McMurray | 276 (–114) |
| 1 | 13 | Denny Hamlin | 273 (–117) |
| 1 | 14 | Matt Kenseth | 269 (–121) |
| 1 | 15 | A. J. Allmendinger | 265 (–125) |
| 2 | 16 | Ryan Blaney (R) | 255 (–135) |
Official driver's standings

Manufacturers' Championship standings

| Pos | Manufacturer | Points |
|---|---|---|
| 1 | Toyota | 464 |
| 2 | Chevrolet | 443 (–21) |
| 3 | Ford | 404 (–60) |
Official manufacturers' standings

- Note: Only the first 16 positions are included for the driver standings.
  . – Driver has clinched a Chase position.

| Previous race: 2016 GEICO 500 | Sprint Cup Series; 2016 season | Next race: 2016 AAA 400 Drive for Autism |
