= 2016 Axalta "We Paint Winners" 400 =

Race details
- Race 14 of 36 in the 2016 NASCAR Sprint Cup Series
- The 2016 Axalta "We Paint Winners" 400 program cover, featuring Martin Truex Jr.
- Date: June 6, 2016 (postponed from June 5, 2016)
- Location: Pocono Raceway in Long Pond, Pennsylvania
- Course: Permanent racing facility
- Course length: 2.5 miles (4 km)
- Distance: 160 laps, 400 mi (640 km)
- Average speed: 125.49 mph (201.96 km/h)

Pole position
Driver	Brad Keselowski	Team Penske
- Time: 49.525 seconds

Most laps led
Driver	Chase Elliott	Hendrick Motorsports
- Laps: 51

Winner
No. 41	Kurt Busch	Stewart–Haas Racing

Television in the United States
- Network: FS1
- Announcers: Mike Joy, Jeff Gordon and Darrell Waltrip

Radio in the United States
- Radio: MRN
- Booth announcers: Joe Moore, Jeff Striegle and Rusty Wallace
- Turn announcers: Dave Moody (1), Mike Bagley (2) and Kyle Rickey (3)

The 2016 Axalta "We Paint Winners" 400 was a NASCAR Sprint Cup Series stock car race held on June 6, 2016 at Pocono Raceway in Long Pond, Pennsylvania. The race, postponed a day because of persistent rain, was contested over 160 laps on the 2.5-mile (4.0 km) triangular racecourse, and was the fourteenth race of the 2016 NASCAR Sprint Cup Series.

Kurt Busch scored his first and only victory of the 2016 season, his third career victory at Pocono and first win at the track since 2007. the race had 14 lead changes among different drivers and ten cautions for 40 laps.

== Background ==
Layout of Pocono Raceway, the track where the race was held.

Pocono Raceway is a 2.5-mile (4.0 km) tri-oval track in Blakeslee, Pennsylvania. Entering the race, Kevin Harvick leads the points with 457, while Kurt Busch is 36 points back, Jimmie Johnson is 48 points back, Kyle Busch is 52 points back, and Carl Edwards is 53 points back. Harvick, Johnson, Kyle Busch, Edwards, Brad Keselowski, Martin Truex Jr., Matt Kenseth, and Denny Hamlin have already clinched a Chase position.

=== Entry list ===
The preliminary entry list for the race included forty cars and was released on May 30, 2016 at 12:48 pm ET.

No.	Driver	Team	Manufacturer
1	Jamie McMurray	Chip Ganassi Racing	Chevrolet
2	Brad Keselowski	Team Penske	Ford
3	Austin Dillon	Richard Childress Racing	Chevrolet
4	Kevin Harvick	Stewart–Haas Racing	Chevrolet
5	Kasey Kahne	Hendrick Motorsports	Chevrolet
6	Trevor Bayne	Roush Fenway Racing	Ford
7	Regan Smith	Tommy Baldwin Racing	Chevrolet
10	Danica Patrick	Stewart–Haas Racing	Chevrolet
11	Denny Hamlin	Joe Gibbs Racing	Toyota
13	Casey Mears	Germain Racing	Chevrolet
14	Tony Stewart	Stewart–Haas Racing	Chevrolet
15	Clint Bowyer	HScott Motorsports	Chevrolet
16	Greg Biffle	Roush Fenway Racing	Ford
17	Ricky Stenhouse Jr.	Roush Fenway Racing	Ford
18	Kyle Busch	Joe Gibbs Racing	Toyota
19	Carl Edwards	Joe Gibbs Racing	Toyota
20	Matt Kenseth	Joe Gibbs Racing	Toyota
21	Ryan Blaney (R)	Wood Brothers Racing	Ford
22	Joey Logano	Team Penske	Ford
23	David Ragan	BK Racing	Toyota
24	Chase Elliott (R)	Hendrick Motorsports	Chevrolet
27	Paul Menard	Richard Childress Racing	Chevrolet
30	Josh Wise	The Motorsports Group	Chevrolet
31	Ryan Newman	Richard Childress Racing	Chevrolet
32	Jeb Burton (i)	Go FAS Racing	Ford
34	Chris Buescher (R)	Front Row Motorsports	Ford
38	Landon Cassill	Front Row Motorsports	Ford
41	Kurt Busch	Stewart–Haas Racing	Chevrolet
42	Kyle Larson	Chip Ganassi Racing	Chevrolet
43	Aric Almirola	Richard Petty Motorsports	Ford
44	Brian Scott (R)	Richard Petty Motorsports	Ford
46	Michael Annett	HScott Motorsports	Chevrolet
47	A. J. Allmendinger	JTG Daugherty Racing	Chevrolet
48	Jimmie Johnson	Hendrick Motorsports	Chevrolet
55	Cole Whitt	Premium Motorsports	Chevrolet
78	Martin Truex Jr.	Furniture Row Racing	Toyota
83	Matt DiBenedetto	BK Racing	Toyota
88	Dale Earnhardt Jr.	Hendrick Motorsports	Chevrolet
95	Ty Dillon (i)	Circle Sport – Leavine Family Racing	Chevrolet
98	Reed Sorenson	Premium Motorsports	Chevrolet
Official entry list

Key	Meaning
(R)	Running for Rookie of the Year
(i)	Not eligible for Sprint Cup Series points

== Practice ==
=== First practice ===
Carl Edwards was the fastest in the first practice session with a time of 50.055 and a speed of 179.802 mph (289.363 km/h).

Pos	No.	Driver	Team	Manufacturer	Time	Speed
1	19	Carl Edwards	Joe Gibbs Racing	Toyota	50.055	179.802
2	4	Kevin Harvick	Stewart–Haas Racing	Chevrolet	50.328	178.827
3	41	Kurt Busch	Stewart–Haas Racing	Chevrolet	50.378	178.649
First practice results

=== Final practice ===
Kyle Busch was the fastest in the final practice session with a time of 50.876 and a speed of 176.901 mph (284.695 km/h).

Pos	No.	Driver	Team	Manufacturer	Time	Speed
1	18	Kyle Busch	Joe Gibbs Racing	Toyota	50.876	176.901
2	41	Kurt Busch	Stewart–Haas Racing	Chevrolet	50.905	176.800
3	48	Jimmie Johnson	Hendrick Motorsports	Chevrolet	50.931	176.710
Final practice results

== Qualifying ==
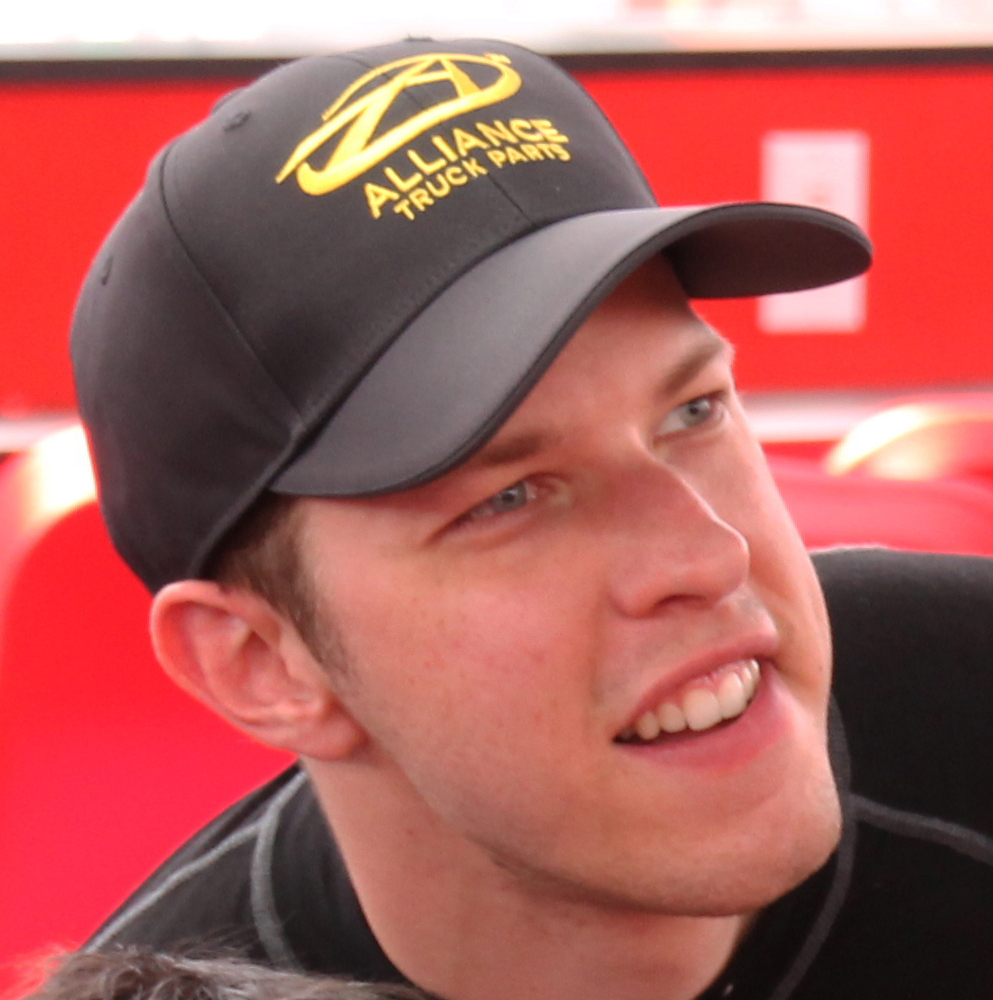
Brad Keselowski won the pole position with a time of 49.525 seconds.

Brad Keselowski scored the pole for the race with a time of 49.525 and a speed of 181.726 mph (292.460 km/h). He said after qualifying that his car was "really fast. My teammate Joey Logano, he’s really fast. He’s probably not really happy I won the pole, but it goes the other way sometimes where he gets it.” He also added that he "felt really good when we ran the first round and I was third and knew I had a little more speed left. We ran the second round and I didn’t feel I had anything left and was still third. I got down into turn one on my last run there and it kind of bottomed out and shot up the hill a little and I wasn’t very confident at all. I have learned over time that these things have a way of working themselves out when they are meant to be and I guess today was meant to be.”

Joey Logano, who qualified second, said his qualifying performance was "similar to last week when I won the first two rounds and came in second in the last one. It stings a little bit because I really wanted to get a pole. We're mad about second and it's a good thing when you're mad about second because it means your organization and your team is where it needs to be mad." He also added that he's "excited about the race Sunday" and that Pocono "has been a good race track for us in the past.”

=== Qualifying results ===
Pos	No.	Driver	Team	Manufacturer	R1	R2	R3
1	2	Brad Keselowski	Team Penske	Ford	50.073	49.776	49.525
2	22	Joey Logano	Team Penske	Ford	49.922	49.702	49.614
3	20	Matt Kenseth	Joe Gibbs Racing	Toyota	50.613	49.914	49.637
4	4	Kevin Harvick	Stewart–Haas Racing	Chevrolet	50.080	49.864	49.671
5	19	Carl Edwards	Joe Gibbs Racing	Toyota	50.028	49.957	49.790
6	14	Tony Stewart	Stewart–Haas Racing	Chevrolet	50.708	49.875	49.844
7	48	Jimmie Johnson	Hendrick Motorsports	Chevrolet	50.228	49.851	49.987
8	88	Dale Earnhardt Jr.	Hendrick Motorsports	Chevrolet	50.116	50.042	50.110
9	41	Kurt Busch	Stewart–Haas Racing	Chevrolet	50.317	49.768	50.147
10	11	Denny Hamlin	Joe Gibbs Racing	Toyota	50.479	50.102	50.153
11	5	Kasey Kahne	Hendrick Motorsports	Chevrolet	50.079	50.132	50.296
12	18	Kyle Busch	Joe Gibbs Racing	Toyota	50.380	49.829	50.328
13	24	Chase Elliott (R)	Hendrick Motorsports	Chevrolet	50.730	50.155	
14	21	Ryan Blaney (R)	Wood Brothers Racing	Ford	50.173	50.173	
15	16	Greg Biffle	Roush Fenway Racing	Ford	50.196	50.237	
16	43	Aric Almirola	Richard Petty Motorsports	Ford	50.731	50.285	
17	78	Martin Truex Jr.	Furniture Row Racing	Toyota	50.198	50.346	
18	34	Chris Buescher (R)	Front Row Motorsports	Ford	50.741	50.451	
19	3	Austin Dillon	Richard Childress Racing	Chevrolet	50.768	50.457	
20	27	Paul Menard	Richard Childress Racing	Chevrolet	50.584	50.459	
21	42	Kyle Larson	Chip Ganassi Racing	Chevrolet	50.682	50.495	
22	31	Ryan Newman	Richard Childress Racing	Chevrolet	50.561	50.522	
23	15	Clint Bowyer	HScott Motorsports	Chevrolet	50.706	50.527	
24	6	Trevor Bayne	Roush Fenway Racing	Ford	50.453	50.531	
25	17	Ricky Stenhouse Jr.	Roush Fenway Racing	Ford	50.771		
26	1	Jamie McMurray	Chip Ganassi Racing	Chevrolet	50.788		
27	83	Matt DiBenedetto	BK Racing	Toyota	50.789		
28	95	Ty Dillon (i)	Circle Sport – Leavine Family Racing	Chevrolet	50.855		
29	13	Casey Mears	Germain Racing	Chevrolet	50.868		
30	44	Brian Scott (R)	Richard Petty Motorsports	Ford	50.951		
31	38	Landon Cassill	Front Row Motorsports	Ford	51.006		
32	47	A. J. Allmendinger	JTG Daugherty Racing	Chevrolet	51.050		
33	10	Danica Patrick	Stewart–Haas Racing	Chevrolet	51.221		
34	23	David Ragan	BK Racing	Toyota	51.292		
35	7	Regan Smith	Tommy Baldwin Racing	Chevrolet	51.529		
36	46	Michael Annett	HScott Motorsports	Chevrolet	51.976		
37	55	Cole Whitt	Premium Motorsports	Chevrolet	51.988		
38	30	Josh Wise	The Motorsports Group	Chevrolet	53.205		
39	32	Jeb Burton (i)	Go FAS Racing	Ford	54.001		
40	98	Reed Sorenson	Premium Motorsports	Chevrolet	54.849		
Official qualifying results

== Race ==
The race was scheduled to run on Sunday, June 5 at 1:00 p.m., but rain forced the race to be postponed to Monday.

=== First half ===
==== Start ====
Under mostly sunny Pennsylvania skies, Brad Keselowski led the field to the green flag at 12:13 p.m. Teammate Joey Logano passed him exiting turn 1 to take the lead. The first caution of the race flew on lap 4 for a single-car spin in turn 3. Riding the high line, Matt DiBenedetto got loose and spun out. He managed to save it without touching the wall.

The race restarted on lap 7. The second caution of the race flew on lap 16. It was a scheduled competition caution for overnight rain. Kyle Larson opted not to pit and assumed the lead. Kevin Harvick and Kasey Kahne were tagged for speeding on pit road and restarted the race from the tail-end of the field.

The race restarted on lap 20. The third caution of the race flew on lap 22 for a single-car spin in turn 1. Rounding the turn, Brian Scott got loose, made contact with the wall and spun out. Keselowski was called to pit road for unapproved body modifications. More specifically, one of his crew members dented in a side panel that could give the car an aerodynamic advantage.

The race restarted on lap 27. Larson pitted from the lead the same lap and handed the lead to Matt Kenseth. A number of cars began pitting on lap 52. Kenseth made his stop on lap 54 and handed the lead to Harvick. The fourth caution of the race flew on lap 60 for a single-car wreck in turn 1 involving DiBenedetto. He would go on to finish 40th. Harvick pitted under the caution and handed the lead back to Kenseth. Aric Almirola was tagged for his crew being over the wall too soon and restarted the race from the tail-end of the field.

==== Second quarter ====
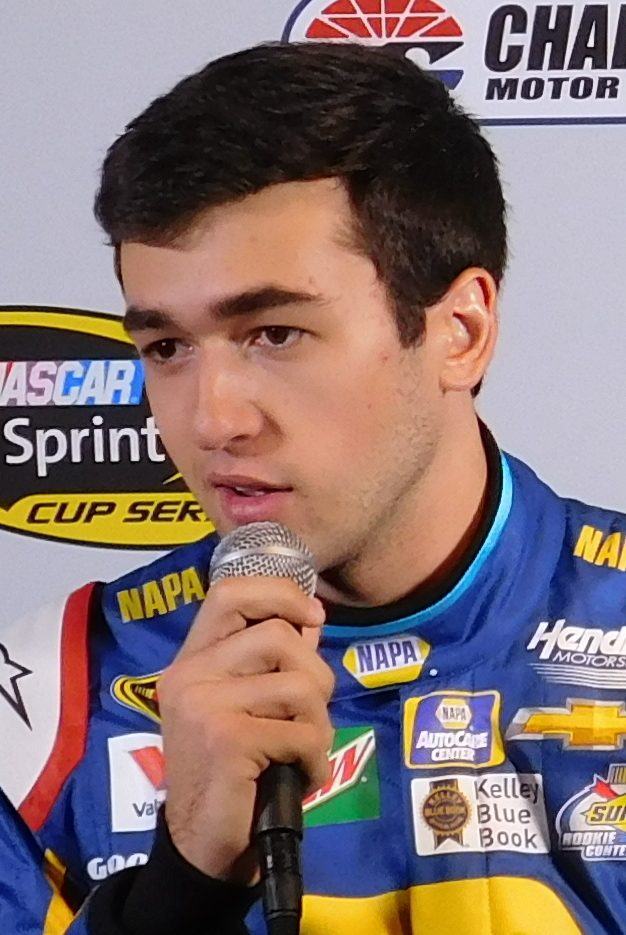
Chase Elliott was the leader of the race for 51 laps.

The race restarted on lap 66. Chase Elliott drove under Kenseth and Kyle Busch to take the lead on lap 67. A number of cars began pitting on lap 86. Elliott hit pit road on lap 87 and handed the lead to Busch. Debris in turn 2 brought out the fifth caution of the race on lap 88. Busch pitted under the caution and the lead cycled back to Elliott.

=== Second half ===
==== Halfway ====
The race restarted on lap 93 and a multi-car wreck on the Long Pond Straightaway brought out the sixth caution of the race. Exiting turn 1, Tony Stewart got loose, got into teammate Danica Patrick, hit the wall, came down the track, clipped Landon Cassill and sent him into the wall.

The race restarted with 62 laps to go. The seventh caution of the race flew with 58 laps to go for a single-car wreck in turn 1. Going into the turn, Michael Annett suffered a left-front tire blowout and slammed the wall.

The race restarted with 52 laps to go. The eighth caution of the race flew with 51 laps to go for a single-car wreck on the Long Pond straightaway. Exiting turn 1, Ryan Newman made contact with Busch and sent him into the wall. Chris Buescher also spun out trying to avoid the wreck.

The race restarted with 47 laps to go. The ninth caution of the race flew with 43 laps to go for a single-car wreck in turn 1. Going into the turn, Austin Dillon suffered a right-front brake rotor failure and slammed the wall. A. J. Allmendinger opted not to pit under the caution and assumed the lead. He pitted the next lap, however, and handed the lead to Ty Dillon.

==== Fourth quarter ====
The race restarted with 38 laps to go and a single-car wreck in turn 1 brought out the 10th caution of the race. Rounding the turn, Jimmie Johnson got loose, saved the car but slammed the inside wall. Dillon pitted under the caution and handed the lead to Dale Earnhardt Jr.

The race restarted with 33 laps to go. After a drag race to the line, Kurt Busch took the lead from Earnhardt with 32 laps to go. With his remaining fuel load in question, he saved enough to score the victory.

== Post-race ==
=== Driver comments ===
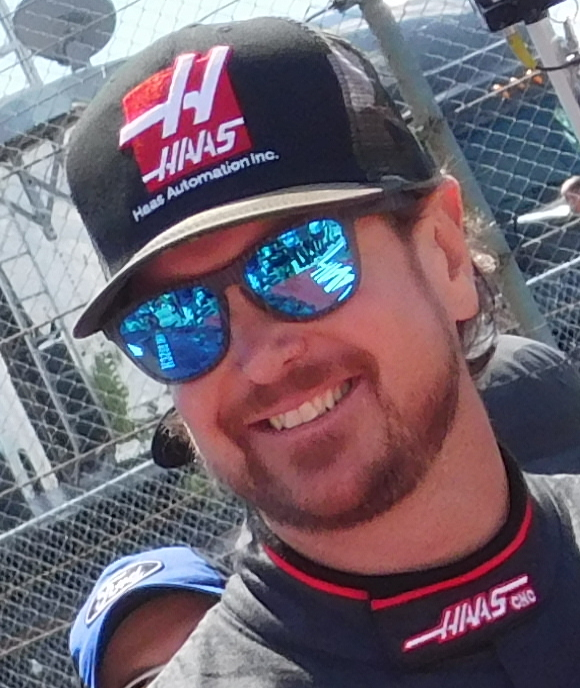
Kurt Busch won the race despite having an interim crew chief.

"It's tough to balance everything," Busch said in victory lane. "We had a fast car and an interim crew chief. And we didn't know if we had enough fuel to make it. ... This was a wonderful win for us. We've been so close all year. It's just so much fun to drive and be up front."

Earnhardt said afterwards that the race "was a good run for us. The car wasn’t all we hoped it would be, but it was good." However, he felt he "should have been able to hold that 41 off on that final restart. Me and the 24 was racing pretty hard and it gave the 41 the opportunity to get a run on us,” Earnhardt said. “If I could have got in front of him I don’t think he would have got by us."

After finishing third, Keselowski took issue with comments made by Fox Sports color commentator Jeff Gordon saying Fox "need[s] to get some people that aren't inbred to the sport and own teams and have internal knowledge, because that is pretty crappy. It is what it is."

Elliott, who finished fourth after leading a race-high of 51 laps, said he "made a big mistake there behind [Earnhardt] in the tunnel [Turn 2]. I wish I had been a little more patient and given ourselves a better chance, but you live and you learn."

== Race results ==
Pos	No.	Driver	Team	Manufacturer	Laps	Pts.
1	41	Kurt Busch	Stewart–Haas Racing	Chevrolet	160	44
2	88	Dale Earnhardt Jr.	Hendrick Motorsports	Chevrolet	160	40
3	2	Brad Keselowski	Team Penske	Ford	160	38
4	24	Chase Elliott (R)	Hendrick Motorsports	Chevrolet	160	39
5	22	Joey Logano	Team Penske	Ford	160	37
6	5	Kasey Kahne	Hendrick Motorsports	Chevrolet	160	35
7	20	Matt Kenseth	Joe Gibbs Racing	Toyota	160	35
8	19	Carl Edwards	Joe Gibbs Racing	Toyota	160	33
9	4	Kevin Harvick	Stewart–Haas Racing	Chevrolet	160	33
10	21	Ryan Blaney (R)	Wood Brothers Racing	Ford	160	31
11	42	Kyle Larson	Chip Ganassi Racing	Chevrolet	160	31
12	31	Ryan Newman	Richard Childress Racing	Chevrolet	160	29
13	6	Trevor Bayne	Roush Fenway Racing	Ford	160	28
14	11	Denny Hamlin	Joe Gibbs Racing	Toyota	160	27
15	17	Ricky Stenhouse Jr.	Roush Fenway Racing	Ford	160	26
16	47	A. J. Allmendinger	JTG Daugherty Racing	Chevrolet	160	26
17	1	Jamie McMurray	Chip Ganassi Racing	Chevrolet	160	24
18	15	Clint Bowyer	HScott Motorsports	Chevrolet	160	23
19	78	Martin Truex Jr.	Furniture Row Racing	Toyota	160	22
20	43	Aric Almirola	Richard Petty Motorsports	Ford	160	21
21	95	Ty Dillon (i)	Circle Sport – Leavine Family Racing	Chevrolet	160	0
22	7	Regan Smith	Tommy Baldwin Racing	Chevrolet	160	19
23	23	David Ragan	BK Racing	Toyota	160	18
24	13	Casey Mears	Germain Racing	Chevrolet	160	17
25	34	Chris Buescher (R)	Front Row Motorsports	Ford	159	16
26	16	Greg Biffle	Roush Fenway Racing	Ford	159	15
27	30	Josh Wise	The Motorsports Group	Chevrolet	159	14
28	98	Reed Sorenson	Premium Motorsports	Chevrolet	159	13
29	32	Jeb Burton (i)	Go FAS Racing	Ford	158	0
30	55	Cole Whitt	Premium Motorsports	Chevrolet	155	11
31	18	Kyle Busch	Joe Gibbs Racing	Toyota	150	11
32	10	Danica Patrick	Stewart–Haas Racing	Chevrolet	145	9
33	27	Paul Menard	Richard Childress Racing	Chevrolet	135	8
34	14	Tony Stewart	Stewart–Haas Racing	Chevrolet	131	7
35	48	Jimmie Johnson	Hendrick Motorsports	Chevrolet	125	6
36	38	Landon Cassill	Front Row Motorsports	Ford	121	5
37	3	Austin Dillon	Richard Childress Racing	Chevrolet	117	4
38	46	Michael Annett	HScott Motorsports	Chevrolet	102	3
39	44	Brian Scott (R)	Richard Petty Motorsports	Ford	81	2
40	83	Matt DiBenedetto	BK Racing	Toyota	57	1
Official race results

=== Race summary ===
- Lead changes: 14 among different drivers
- Cautions/Laps: 10 for 40
- Red flags: 0
- Time of race: 3 hours, 11 minutes, and 15 seconds
- Average speed: 125.49 miles per hour (201.96 km/h)

== Media ==
=== Television ===
Fox NASCAR televised the race in the United States on FS1 for the second consecutive year. Mike Joy was the lap-by-lap announcer, while six-time Pocono winner, Jeff Gordon and four-time winner Darrell Waltrip were the color commentators. Jamie Little, Vince Welch and Matt Yocum reported from pit lane during the race.

FS1 Television
Booth announcers	Pit reporters
Lap-by-lap: Mike Joy; Color-commentator: Jeff Gordon; Color commentator: Darrell Waltrip	Jamie Little; Vince Welch; Matt Yocum

=== Radio ===
Radio coverage of the race was broadcast by Motor Racing Network (MRN) and simulcasted on Sirius XM NASCAR Radio. Joe Moore, Jeff Striegle and four-time Pocono winner Rusty Wallace announced the race in the booth while the field was racing on the front stretch. Dave Moody called the race from atop a billboard outside of turn 1 when the field was racing through turn 1 while Mike Bagley called the race from a billboard outside turn 2 when the field was racing through turn 2. Kyle Rickey reported the race from a billboard outside turn 3 when the field was racing through turn 3. Alex Hayden, Glenn Jarrett and Steve Post reported from pit lane during the race.

MRN
Booth announcers	Turn announcers	Pit reporters
Lead announcer: Joe Moore; Announcer: Jeff Striegle; Announcer: Rusty Wallace	Turn 1: Dave Moody; Turn 2: Mike Bagley; Turn 3: Kyle Rickey	Alex Hayden; Glenn Jarrett; Steve Post

== Standings after the race ==
Drivers' Championship standings
	Pos	Manufacturer	Points
	1	Kevin Harvick	490
	2	Kurt Busch	465 (–25)
3	3	Brad Keselowski	442 (–48)
1	4	Carl Edwards	437 (–53)
1	5	Kyle Busch	416 (–74)
3	6	Jimmie Johnson	415 (–75)
1	7	Chase Elliott (R)	413 (–77)
1	8	Joey Logano	410 (–80)
2	9	Martin Truex Jr.	403 (–87)
	10	Matt Kenseth	382 (–108)
2	11	Dale Earnhardt Jr.	381 (–109)
1	12	Denny Hamlin	372 (–118)
1	13	Austin Dillon	348 (–142)
	14	Jamie McMurray	342 (–148)
	15	Ryan Blaney (R)	340 (–150)
	16	Ryan Newman	338 (–152)
Official driver's standings

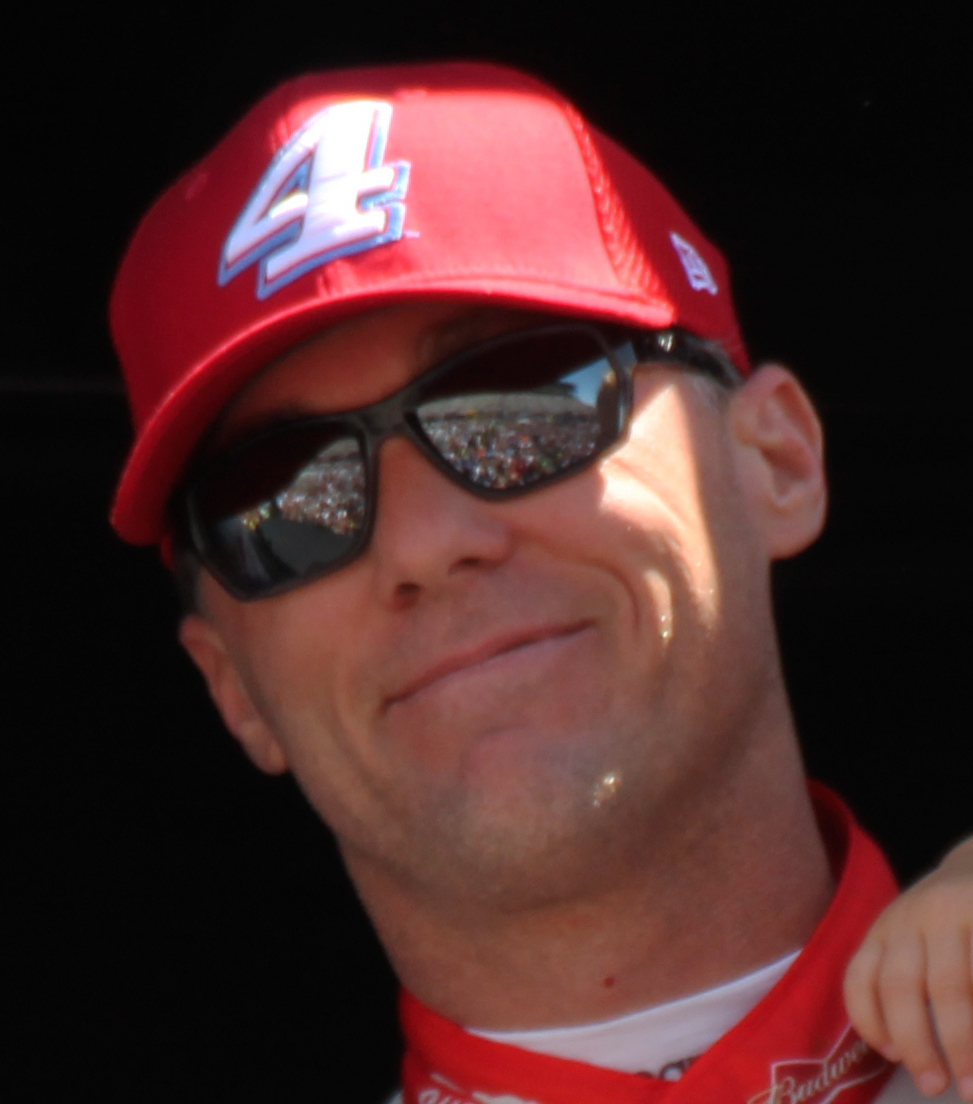
Kevin Harvick continued to lead in the championship standings.

Manufacturers' Championship standings
Pos	Manufacturer	Points
1	Toyota	588
2	Chevrolet	566 (–22)
3	Ford	514 (–74)
Official manufacturers' standings

- Note: Only the first 16 positions are included for the driver standings.
  . – Driver has clinched a position in the Chase for the Sprint Cup.

Previous race: 2016 Coca-Cola 600	Sprint Cup Series; 2016 season	Next race: 2016 FireKeepers Casino 400
