= 2016 AAA 400 Drive for Autism =

Race details
- Race 12 of 36 in the 2016 NASCAR Sprint Cup Series
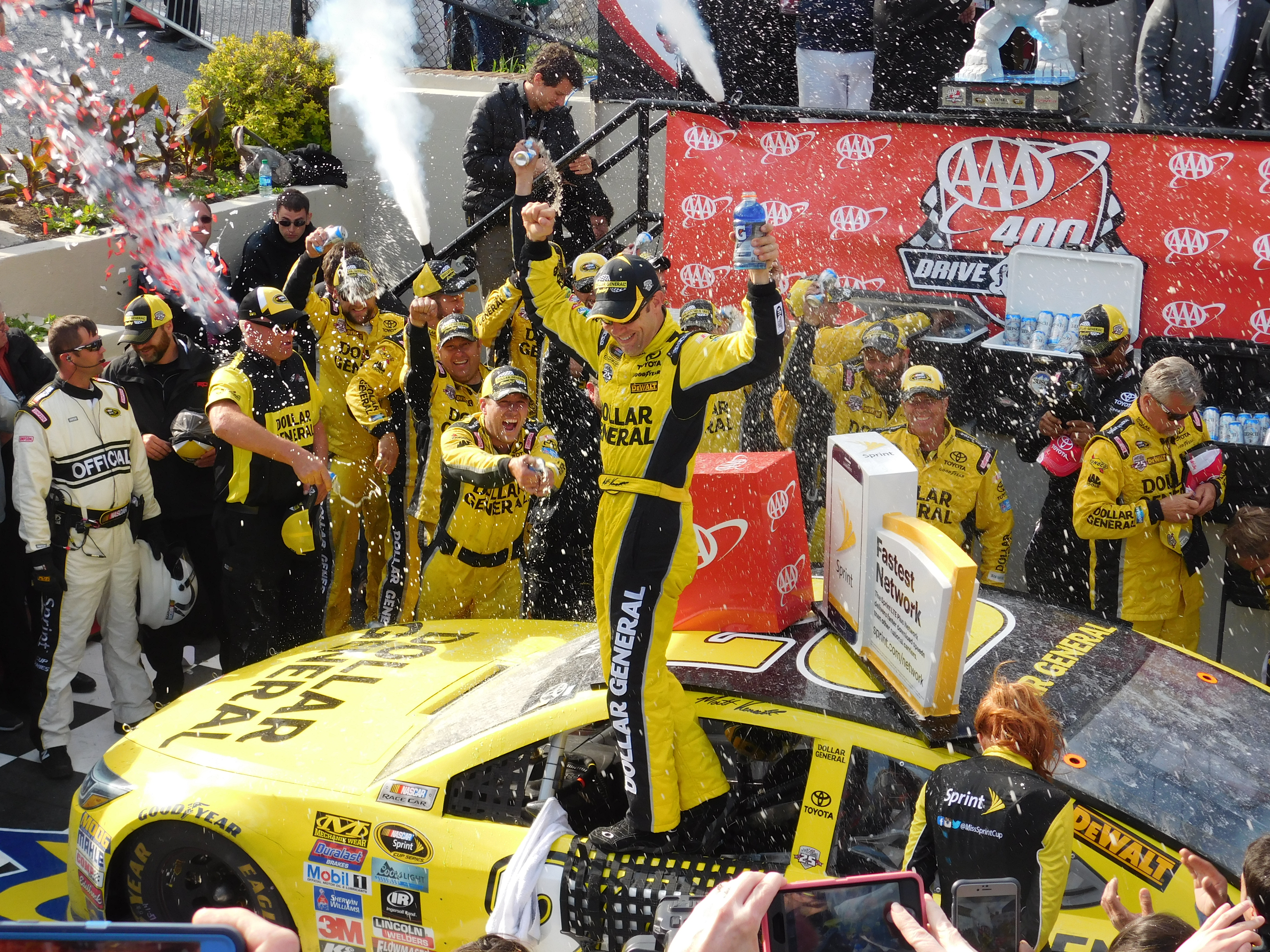
- Date: May 15, 2016
- Location: Dover International Speedway in Dover, Delaware
- Course: Permanent racing facility
- Course length: 1 miles (1.6 km)
- Distance: 400 laps, 400 mi (640 km)
- Weather: Partly cloudy with a temperature of 59 °F (15 °C); wind out of the west at 21 mph (34 km/h)
- Average speed: 109.348 mph (175.979 km/h)

Pole position
| Driver | Kevin Harvick | Stewart–Haas Racing |
- Time: 21.799 / 165.145 mph (265.775 km/h); FP1 (rain)

Most laps led
| Driver | Kevin Harvick | Stewart–Haas Racing |
- Laps: 117

Winner
| No. 20 | Matt Kenseth | Joe Gibbs Racing |

Television in the United States
- Network: Fox Sports 1
- Announcers: Mike Joy, Jeff Gordon and Darrell Waltrip
- Nielsen ratings: 2.2 (Overnight); 3.9 million viewers

Radio in the United States
- Radio: MRN
- Booth announcers: Joe Moore, Jeff Striegle and Rusty Wallace
- Turn announcers: Mike Bagley (Backstretch)

The 2016 AAA 400 Drive for Autism was a NASCAR Sprint Cup Series race held on May 15, 2016, at Dover International Speedway in Dover, Delaware. Contested over 400 laps on the 1-mile (1.6 km) concrete speedway, it was the 12th race of the 2016 NASCAR Sprint Cup season. The race had 19 lead changes among different drivers, and twelve cautions for 65 laps, along with a red-flag period of 11 minutes, 22 seconds.

== Report ==
=== Background ===
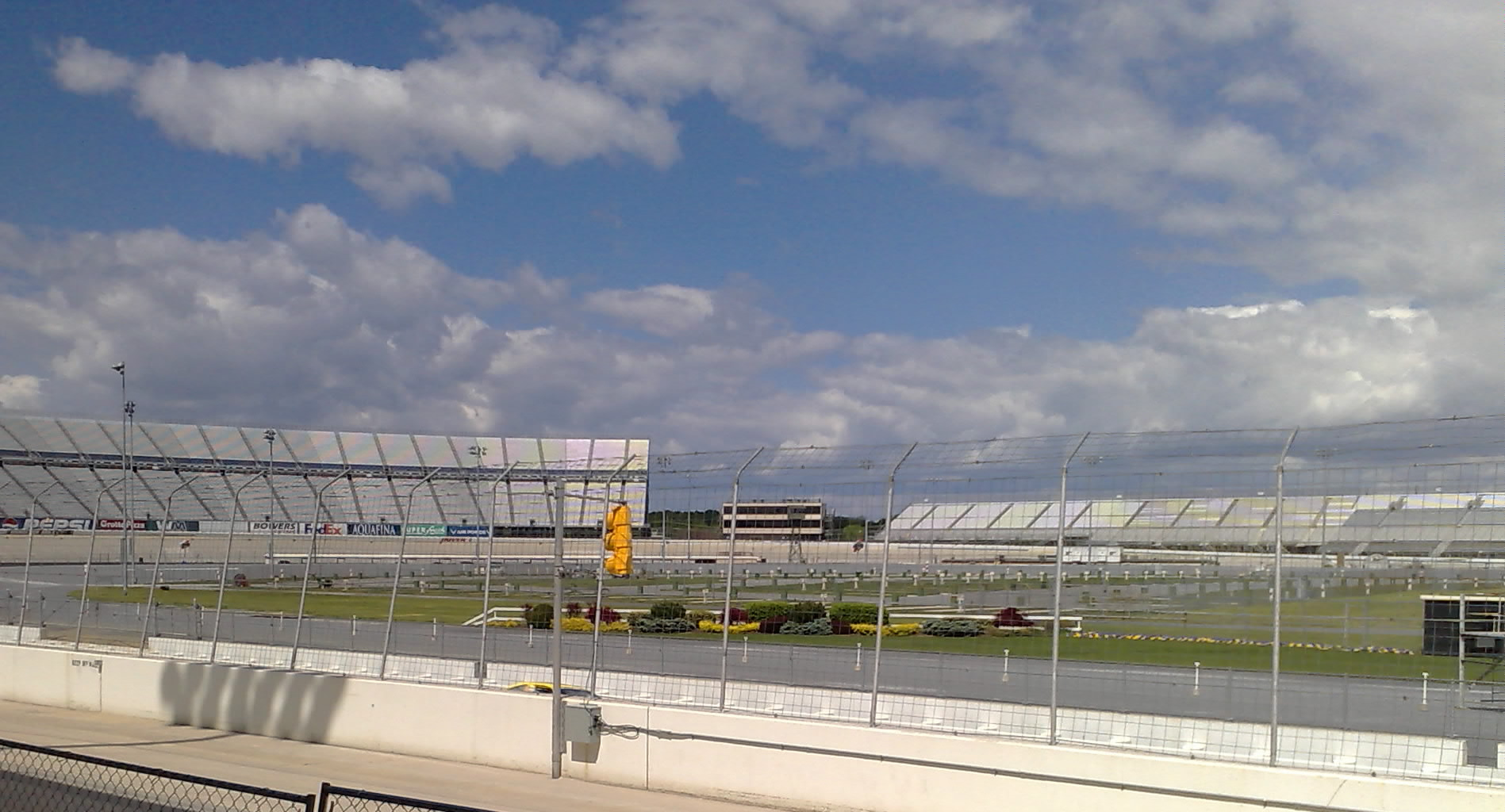
Dover International Speedway, the track where the race was held.

Dover International Speedway is a 1.000 mi (1.609 km) oval track in Dover, Delaware. Entering the race, Kevin Harvick leads the points with 390, while Kyle Busch is 4 points back, Carl Edwards is 23 points back, Jimmie Johnson is 37 points back, and Kurt Busch is 40 points back.

=== Entry list ===
Forty cars are entered for the race.

| No. | Driver | Team | Manufacturer |
|---|---|---|---|
| 1 | Jamie McMurray | Chip Ganassi Racing | Chevrolet |
| 2 | Brad Keselowski | Team Penske | Ford |
| 3 | Austin Dillon | Richard Childress Racing | Chevrolet |
| 4 | Kevin Harvick | Stewart–Haas Racing | Chevrolet |
| 5 | Kasey Kahne | Hendrick Motorsports | Chevrolet |
| 6 | Trevor Bayne | Roush Fenway Racing | Ford |
| 7 | Regan Smith | Tommy Baldwin Racing | Chevrolet |
| 10 | Danica Patrick | Stewart–Haas Racing | Chevrolet |
| 11 | Denny Hamlin | Joe Gibbs Racing | Toyota |
| 13 | Casey Mears | Germain Racing | Chevrolet |
| 14 | Tony Stewart | Stewart–Haas Racing | Chevrolet |
| 15 | Clint Bowyer | HScott Motorsports | Chevrolet |
| 16 | Greg Biffle | Roush Fenway Racing | Ford |
| 17 | Ricky Stenhouse Jr. | Roush Fenway Racing | Ford |
| 18 | Kyle Busch | Joe Gibbs Racing | Toyota |
| 19 | Carl Edwards | Joe Gibbs Racing | Toyota |
| 20 | Matt Kenseth | Joe Gibbs Racing | Toyota |
| 21 | Ryan Blaney (R) | Wood Brothers Racing | Ford |
| 22 | Joey Logano | Team Penske | Ford |
| 23 | David Ragan | BK Racing | Toyota |
| 24 | Chase Elliott (R) | Hendrick Motorsports | Chevrolet |
| 27 | Paul Menard | Richard Childress Racing | Chevrolet |
| 30 | Josh Wise | The Motorsports Group | Chevrolet |
| 31 | Ryan Newman | Richard Childress Racing | Chevrolet |
| 32 | Jeffrey Earnhardt (R) | Go FAS Racing | Ford |
| 34 | Chris Buescher (R) | Front Row Motorsports | Ford |
| 38 | Landon Cassill | Front Row Motorsports | Ford |
| 41 | Kurt Busch | Stewart–Haas Racing | Chevrolet |
| 42 | Kyle Larson | Chip Ganassi Racing | Chevrolet |
| 43 | Aric Almirola | Richard Petty Motorsports | Ford |
| 44 | Brian Scott (R) | Richard Petty Motorsports | Ford |
| 46 | Michael Annett | HScott Motorsports | Chevrolet |
| 47 | A. J. Allmendinger | JTG Daugherty Racing | Chevrolet |
| 48 | Jimmie Johnson | Hendrick Motorsports | Chevrolet |
| 55 | Reed Sorenson | Premium Motorsports | Chevrolet |
| 78 | Martin Truex Jr. | Furniture Row Racing | Toyota |
| 83 | Matt DiBenedetto | BK Racing | Toyota |
| 88 | Dale Earnhardt Jr. | Hendrick Motorsports | Chevrolet |
| 95 | Michael McDowell | Circle Sport – Leavine Family Racing | Chevrolet |
| 98 | Cole Whitt | Premium Motorsports | Chevrolet |
Official entry list

== Practice ==
=== First practice ===
Kevin Harvick was the fastest in the first practice session with a time of 21.799 and a speed of 165.145 mph (265.775 km/h). Four minutes into the session, Danica Patrick's engine expired, dumped oil onto the track, spun and caught fire on the frontstretch. Jamie McMurray and Tony Stewart were caught in the oil and slammed the wall. All three went to backup cars. Patrick said afterwards that "there was oil, a fire and the car spun and was caught by the wall. I'm not sure what happened, but this is obviously not something we normally see. You don't see a lot of failures like that. I'm sure they will figure out what it is. It sucks when it takes other people with you."

Harvick, speaking on his teammate's wreck on a part of the outside wall not reinforced with SAFER barriers, said that they've been put "in the groove at Darlington and it's two-and-a-half cars wide. So, there's really no excuse not to have it in my opinion. ... We don't wear our helmets and HANS devices for the impacts that we are prepared for. We wear those things for the instances where those one-off things can happen like happened today."

| Pos | No. | Driver | Team | Manufacturer | Time | Speed |
|---|---|---|---|---|---|---|
| 1 | 4 | Kevin Harvick | Stewart–Haas Racing | Chevrolet | 21.799 | 165.145 |
| 2 | 88 | Dale Earnhardt Jr. | Hendrick Motorsports | Chevrolet | 21.857 | 164.707 |
| 3 | 18 | Kyle Busch | Joe Gibbs Racing | Toyota | 21.886 | 164.489 |
Official first practice results

=== Second practice ===
Kyle Busch was the fastest in the second practice session with a time of 22.808 and a speed of 157.839 mph (254.017 km/h).

| Pos | No. | Driver | Team | Manufacturer | Time | Speed |
|---|---|---|---|---|---|---|
| 1 | 18 | Kyle Busch | Joe Gibbs Racing | Toyota | 22.808 | 157.839 |
| 2 | 11 | Denny Hamlin | Joe Gibbs Racing | Toyota | 22.878 | 157.356 |
| 3 | 19 | Carl Edwards | Joe Gibbs Racing | Toyota | 22.929 | 157.006 |
Official second practice results

=== Final practice ===
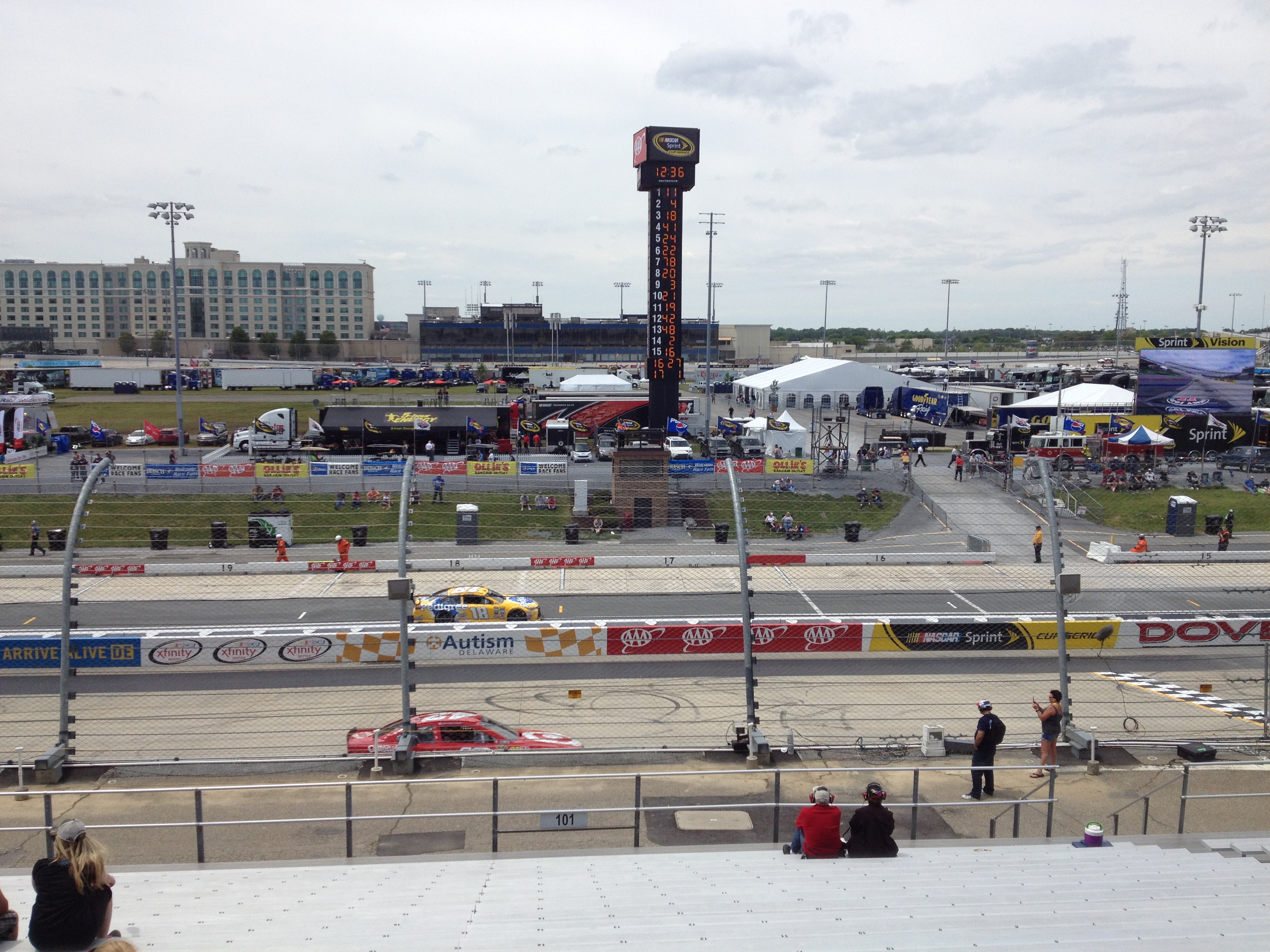
Final practice

Denny Hamlin was the fastest in the final practice session with a time of 22.882 and a speed of 157.329 mph (253.196 km/h).

| Pos | No. | Driver | Team | Manufacturer | Time | Speed |
|---|---|---|---|---|---|---|
| 1 | 11 | Denny Hamlin | Joe Gibbs Racing | Toyota | 22.882 | 157.329 |
| 2 | 4 | Kevin Harvick | Stewart–Haas Racing | Chevrolet | 23.011 | 156.447 |
| 3 | 18 | Kyle Busch | Joe Gibbs Racing | Toyota | 23.023 | 156.365 |
Official final practice results

== Qualifying ==
Kevin Harvick claimed the pole after a rained out qualifying session. The starting grid was set on times from the first practice. Dale Earnhardt Jr., who started second, said he hoped "we will get some practice tomorrow to get to work on the race set-up a little bit. We just ran in qualifying trim today. The car was not real close when we came off the trailer, but they made some great adjustments and got some good speed out of it, got it real comfortable. I like this track. It is challenging to run the way you want to run every lap, lap after lap, and that is a fun challenge."

=== Qualifying results ===
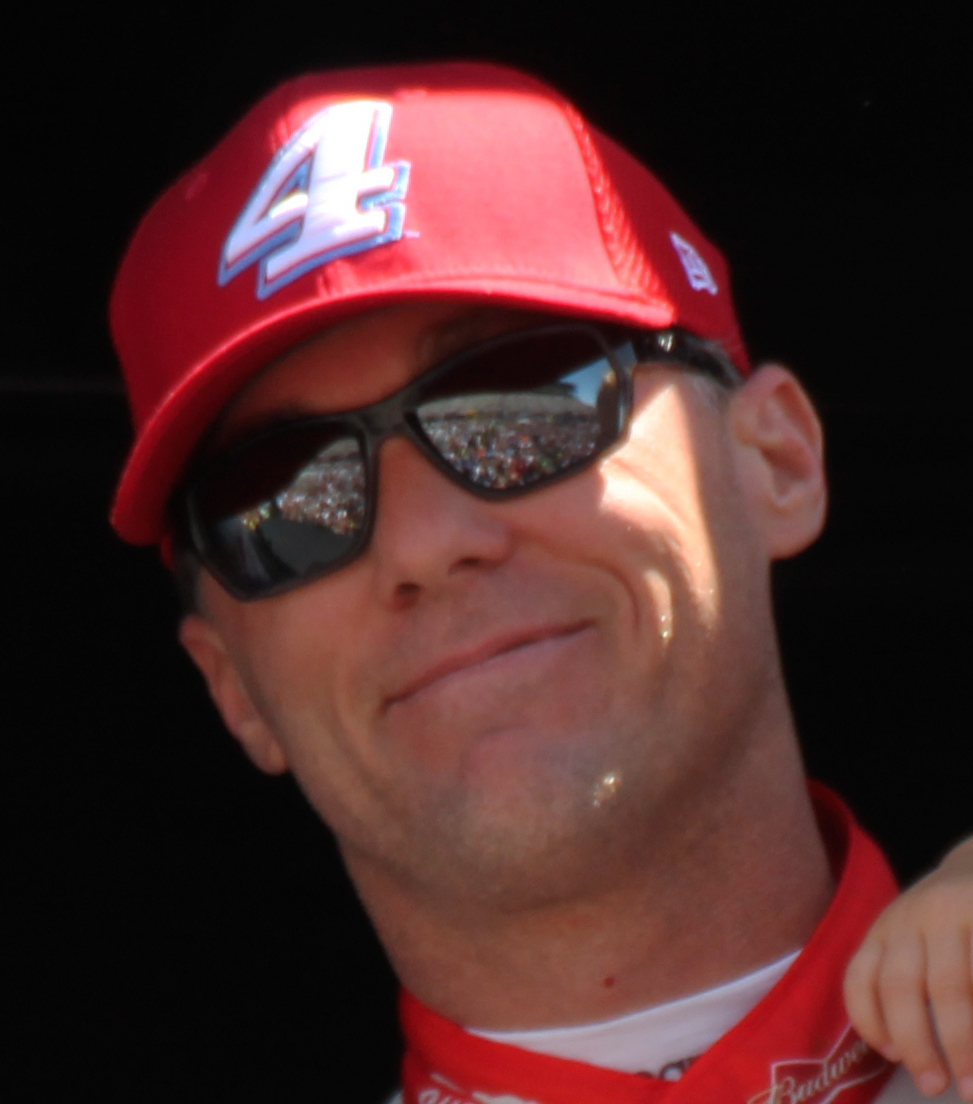
Kevin Harvick received the pole position after time trials were canceled.

| Pos | No. | Driver | Team | Manufacturer |
|---|---|---|---|---|
| 1 | 4 | Kevin Harvick | Stewart–Haas Racing | Chevrolet |
| 2 | 88 | Dale Earnhardt Jr. | Hendrick Motorsports | Chevrolet |
| 3 | 18 | Kyle Busch | Joe Gibbs Racing | Toyota |
| 4 | 19 | Carl Edwards | Joe Gibbs Racing | Toyota |
| 5 | 17 | Ricky Stenhouse Jr. | Roush Fenway Racing | Ford |
| 6 | 11 | Denny Hamlin | Joe Gibbs Racing | Toyota |
| 7 | 78 | Martin Truex Jr. | Furniture Row Racing | Toyota |
| 8 | 31 | Ryan Newman | Richard Childress Racing | Chevrolet |
| 9 | 41 | Kurt Busch | Stewart–Haas Racing | Chevrolet |
| 10 | 20 | Matt Kenseth | Joe Gibbs Racing | Toyota |
| 11 | 5 | Kasey Kahne | Hendrick Motorsports | Chevrolet |
| 12 | 3 | Austin Dillon | Richard Childress Racing | Chevrolet |
| 13 | 24 | Chase Elliott (R) | Hendrick Motorsports | Chevrolet |
| 14 | 2 | Brad Keselowski | Team Penske | Ford |
| 15 | 43 | Aric Almirola | Richard Petty Motorsports | Ford |
| 16 | 16 | Greg Biffle | Roush Fenway Racing | Ford |
| 17 | 44 | Brian Scott (R) | Richard Petty Motorsports | Ford |
| 18 | 21 | Ryan Blaney (R) | Wood Brothers Racing | Ford |
| 19 | 27 | Paul Menard | Richard Childress Racing | Chevrolet |
| 20 | 47 | A. J. Allmendinger | JTG Daugherty Racing | Chevrolet |
| 21 | 48 | Jimmie Johnson | Hendrick Motorsports | Chevrolet |
| 22 | 22 | Joey Logano | Team Penske | Ford |
| 23 | 42 | Kyle Larson | Chip Ganassi Racing | Chevrolet |
| 24 | 1 | Jamie McMurray | Chip Ganassi Racing | Chevrolet |
| 25 | 6 | Trevor Bayne | Roush Fenway Racing | Ford |
| 26 | 13 | Casey Mears | Germain Racing | Chevrolet |
| 27 | 23 | David Ragan | BK Racing | Toyota |
| 28 | 95 | Michael McDowell | Circle Sport – Leavine Family Racing | Chevrolet |
| 29 | 83 | Matt DiBenedetto | BK Racing | Toyota |
| 30 | 34 | Chris Buescher (R) | Front Row Motorsports | Ford |
| 31 | 10 | Danica Patrick | Stewart–Haas Racing | Chevrolet |
| 32 | 15 | Clint Bowyer | HScott Motorsports | Chevrolet |
| 33 | 7 | Regan Smith | Tommy Baldwin Racing | Chevrolet |
| 34 | 14 | Tony Stewart | Stewart–Haas Racing | Chevrolet |
| 35 | 38 | Landon Cassill | Front Row Motorsports | Ford |
| 36 | 98 | Cole Whitt | Premium Motorsports | Chevrolet |
| 37 | 46 | Michael Annett | HScott Motorsports | Chevrolet |
| 38 | 55 | Reed Sorenson | Premium Motorsports | Chevrolet |
| 39 | 32 | Jeffrey Earnhardt (R) | Go FAS Racing | Ford |
| 40 | 30 | Josh Wise | The Motorsports Group | Chevrolet |
Official starting lineup

== Race ==
=== First half ===
==== Start ====
Under mostly sunny Delaware skies, Kevin Harvick led the field to the green flag at 1:16 p.m. After five laps, he pulled to a one-second lead over Carl Edwards. After 15 laps, that gap grew to two seconds. After 30 laps, the gap grew to four seconds. The first caution of the race flew on lap 41. It was a scheduled competition caution due to overnight rain. Edwards exited pit road with the race lead.

The race restarted on lap 46. Harvick dove underneath Edwards going into turn 1 to retake the lead on lap 48. The second caution of the race flew on lap 118 for a single-car wreck on the backstretch. Exiting turn 2, Matt DiBenedetto got loose and slammed the wall. He would go on to finish 40th. Edwards exited pit road with the race lead. Denny Hamlin was tagged for improper fueling and restarted the race from the tail-end of the field.

==== Second quarter ====
The race restarted on lap 125. Matt Kenseth took the lead on lap 132 before ceding it back to Edwards on lap 133. The third caution of the race flew on lap 143 for a single-car spin in turn 4. Rounding the turn, Regan Smith got loose and made contact with the wall. Martin Truex Jr. opted not to pit under the caution and assumed the race lead.

The race restarted on lap 152. Debris in turn 1 brought out the fourth caution of the race on lap 172. Greg Biffle opted not to pit under the caution and assumed the race lead. Ryan Newman was tagged for an uncontrolled tire and restarted the race from the tail-end of the field.

The race restarted on lap 179. Kyle Larson drove underneath Biffle into turn 3 to take the lead on lap 182. The fifth caution of the race flew on lap 183 for a single-car wreck in turn 3. Going into the turn, Austin Dillon suffered a right-front brake rotor failure and slammed the wall. He said afterwards that he thought "it was the brakes. I was complaining about them before that, having to pump them up. I am just frustrated. We had the same issue at Bristol and we come here and we have another issue with the brakes. I'm frustrated, but we had a good car. Our Chevrolet was fast and we had good shot of running top 10, top-five depending on track position."

The race restarted on lap 191. The sixth caution of the race flew on lap 212 for a single-car spin in turn 1. Reed Sorenson blew an engine in turn 1 and spun around. Jimmie Johnson ran through the oil and spun out as well. Hamlin opted not to pit under the caution and assumed the race lead. Jamie McMurray was tagged for speeding on pit road and restarted the race from the tail-end of the field.

=== Second half ===
==== Halfway ====
The race restarted on lap 220. The seventh caution of the race flew for a single-car wreck on the frontstretch. Exiting turn 4, McMurray got into Michael Annett and sent him into the outside wall. Annett's car then came down across the track and slammed the inside wall.

The race restarted on lap 231. Brad Keselowski got by Hamlin in turn 3 to take the lead on lap 232. After 20 laps of battling back and forth, Larson drove by Keselowski exiting turn 2 to retake the lead on lap 281. Debris on the frontstretch brought out the eighth caution of the race with 113 laps to go.

The race restarted with 107 laps to go. Debris on the frontstretch brought out the ninth caution of the race with 102 laps to go.

==== Fourth quarter ====
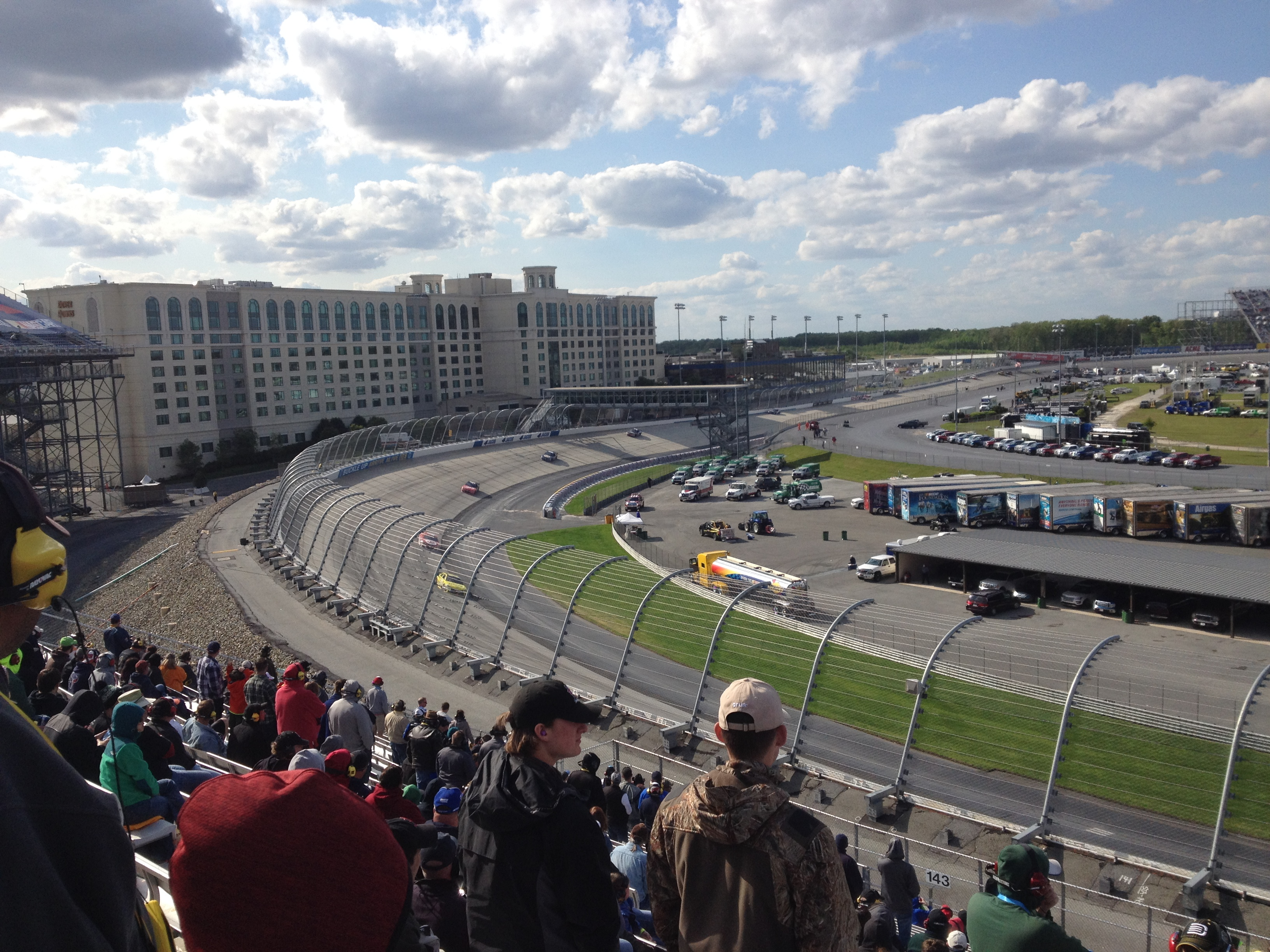
Eventual race winner Matt Kenseth leads in the closing laps of the race

The race restarted with 98 laps to go. After battling for 10 laps, Martin Truex Jr. passed Larson rounding turn 2 to take the lead with 70 laps to go. The 10th caution of the race came with 58 laps to go after Tony Stewart broke a track bar, which punctured the rear gear, spilling rear end grease in turn 1 and Chris Buescher spun out. Johnson exited pit road with the race lead. Under the caution, Johnson led his three-thousandth career lap at Dover.

The race restarted with 46 laps to go and a multi-car wreck just past the start/finish line brought out the 11th caution of the race. Johnson's car stalled out, fell backwards and caused an 18-car wreck. Johnson, Truex, Harvick, McMurray, Newman, A. J. Allmendinger, Ricky Stenhouse Jr., Kyle Busch, Joey Logano, Aric Almirola, Hamlin, Biffle, Casey Mears, Dale Earnhardt Jr., Clint Bowyer, Trevor Bayne, Paul Menard and Michael McDowell were all collected in the wreck. Johnson said afterwards that as soon as he "went from second and tried to go into third, I kind of got up into the neutral gate of the transmission and it didn't even want to go to third", Johnson said. "It stopped before it ever went to third. And then I tried fourth and third and eventually I got hit from behind...I thought maybe I missed a shift, but it wouldn't go into gear. Martin was good and patient with me. He gave me a couple of opportunities to try to find a gear but it just locked out and wouldn't go into gear for some reason." The subsequent cleanup forced the red flag to fly. The red flag was lifted after 11 minutes and 22 seconds.

The race restarted with 41 laps to go and the 12th caution of the race flew for a single-car wreck on the backstretch. Exiting turn 2, Edwards came down on Larson, got hooked into the inside wall. He said afterwards that he "was trying to give Kurt (Busch) a little room, it looked like he got choked up and as I looked at the replay it looked like I moved down a little and Larson got underneath me. I don't think he meant to do it, but it surprised me. I didn't know he was that close. We'll just chalk it up to racing, but the hard part is we felt like we were going to win that million bucks for those kids and I felt like we could win this race. It's tough not to be out there."

The race restarted with 35 laps to go. Despite a hard-fought battle towards the finish with Larson and Chase Elliott, Kenseth – who assumed the lead after the multi-car wreck with 46 laps to go – drove on to score the victory.

== Post-race ==
=== Driver comments ===
Kenseth said after the race that he "had a good car today. I thought we were competitive and there were a few guys at different parts of the race that were a little bit better and Kyle (Larson) gave me all I wanted at the end, and then some. We were fortunate to be able to hold him off."

Larson said that he "got close to his (Kenseth's) bumper a couple of times. I may have gotten into him once. But I'm not going to do anything dirty. I respect Matt Kenseth a lot. He always races me with respect, and I try to do the same with him. I tried to race him as hard as I could without getting into him to beat him."

A dejected Elliott said after the race that he "couldn't be on the good end of (a great race) but proud of our effort today. We really started a good ways out of where we needed to be. I thought we made a lot of really, really solid gains throughout the day to get our car better and better. ... Hate to not get the job done and be so close, but we'll keep digging at it and try to get a little better."

== Race results ==
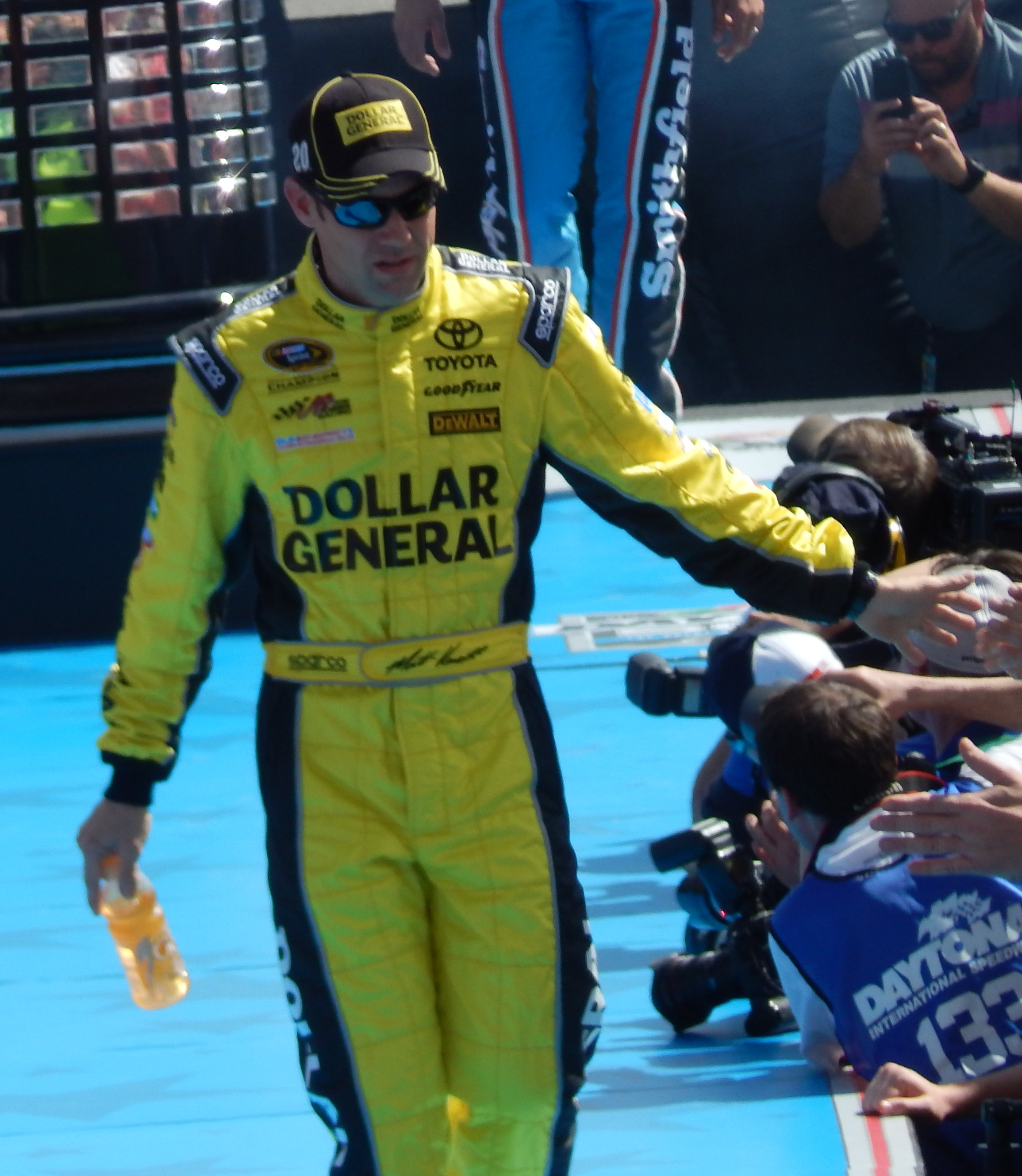
Matt Kenseth (pictured in 2015) won the race after becoming the leader with 35 laps to go.

| Pos | No. | Driver | Team | Manufacturer | Laps | Points |
|---|---|---|---|---|---|---|
| 1 | 20 | Matt Kenseth | Joe Gibbs Racing | Toyota | 400 | 44 |
| 2 | 42 | Kyle Larson | Chip Ganassi Racing | Chevrolet | 400 | 40 |
| 3 | 24 | Chase Elliott (R) | Hendrick Motorsports | Chevrolet | 400 | 38 |
| 4 | 5 | Kasey Kahne | Hendrick Motorsports | Chevrolet | 400 | 37 |
| 5 | 41 | Kurt Busch | Stewart–Haas Racing | Chevrolet | 400 | 36 |
| 6 | 2 | Brad Keselowski | Team Penske | Ford | 400 | 36 |
| 7 | 11 | Denny Hamlin | Joe Gibbs Racing | Toyota | 400 | 35 |
| 8 | 21 | Ryan Blaney (R) | Wood Brothers Racing | Ford | 400 | 33 |
| 9 | 78 | Martin Truex Jr. | Furniture Row Racing | Toyota | 400 | 33 |
| 10 | 6 | Trevor Bayne | Roush Fenway Racing | Ford | 400 | 31 |
| 11 | 27 | Paul Menard | Richard Childress Racing | Chevrolet | 400 | 30 |
| 12 | 15 | Clint Bowyer | HScott Motorsports | Chevrolet | 400 | 29 |
| 13 | 10 | Danica Patrick | Stewart–Haas Racing | Chevrolet | 400 | 28 |
| 14 | 17 | Ricky Stenhouse Jr. | Roush Fenway Racing | Ford | 400 | 27 |
| 15 | 4 | Kevin Harvick | Stewart–Haas Racing | Chevrolet | 399 | 28 |
| 16 | 31 | Ryan Newman | Richard Childress Racing | Chevrolet | 398 | 25 |
| 17 | 23 | David Ragan | BK Racing | Toyota | 397 | 24 |
| 18 | 34 | Chris Buescher (R) | Front Row Motorsports | Ford | 396 | 23 |
| 19 | 38 | Landon Cassill | Front Row Motorsports | Ford | 396 | 22 |
| 20 | 95 | Michael McDowell | Circle Sport – Leavine Family Racing | Chevrolet | 396 | 21 |
| 21 | 1 | Jamie McMurray | Chip Ganassi Racing | Chevrolet | 395 | 20 |
| 22 | 22 | Joey Logano | Team Penske | Ford | 391 | 20 |
| 23 | 47 | A. J. Allmendinger | JTG Daugherty Racing | Chevrolet | 391 | 18 |
| 24 | 44 | Brian Scott (R) | Richard Petty Motorsports | Ford | 390 | 17 |
| 25 | 48 | Jimmie Johnson | Hendrick Motorsports | Chevrolet | 387 | 17 |
| 26 | 13 | Casey Mears | Germain Racing | Chevrolet | 374 | 15 |
| 27 | 98 | Cole Whitt | Premium Motorsports | Chevrolet | 364 | 14 |
| 28 | 19 | Carl Edwards | Joe Gibbs Racing | Toyota | 359 | 14 |
| 29 | 16 | Greg Biffle | Roush Fenway Racing | Ford | 355 | 13 |
| 30 | 18 | Kyle Busch | Joe Gibbs Racing | Toyota | 354 | 11 |
| 31 | 43 | Aric Almirola | Richard Petty Motorsports | Ford | 354 | 10 |
| 32 | 88 | Dale Earnhardt Jr. | Hendrick Motorsports | Chevrolet | 354 | 9 |
| 33 | 3 | Austin Dillon | Richard Childress Racing | Chevrolet | 345 | 8 |
| 34 | 14 | Tony Stewart | Stewart–Haas Racing | Chevrolet | 342 | 7 |
| 35 | 32 | Jeffrey Earnhardt (R) | Go FAS Racing | Ford | 334 | 6 |
| 36 | 30 | Josh Wise | The Motorsports Group | Chevrolet | 331 | 5 |
| 37 | 46 | Michael Annett | HScott Motorsports | Chevrolet | 223 | 4 |
| 38 | 55 | Reed Sorenson | Premium Motorsports | Chevrolet | 204 | 3 |
| 39 | 7 | Regan Smith | Tommy Baldwin Racing | Chevrolet | 139 | 2 |
| 40 | 83 | Matt DiBenedetto | BK Racing | Toyota | 116 | 1 |
Official race results

=== Race summary ===
- Lead changes: 19 among different drivers
- Cautions: 12 for 65 laps
- Red flags: 1 for 11 minutes and 22 seconds
- Time of race: 3 hours, 39 minutes and 29 seconds
- Average speed: 109.348 miles per hour (175.979 km/h)

== Media ==
=== Television ===
Fox Sports covered their sixteenth race at the Dover International Speedway. Mike Joy, five-time Dover winner Jeff Gordon and two-time Dover winner Darrell Waltrip had the call in the booth for the race. Jamie Little, Vince Welch and Matt Yocum handled the action on pit road for the television side.

Fox Sports 1 Television
| Booth announcers | Pit reporters |
|---|---|
| Lap-by-lap: Mike Joy; Color-commentator: Jeff Gordon; Color commentator: Darrell Waltrip | Jamie Little; Vince Welch; Matt Yocum |

=== Radio ===
MRN had the radio call for the race which was also simulcasted on Sirius XM NASCAR Radio.

MRN Radio
| Booth announcers | Turn announcers | Pit reporters |
|---|---|---|
| Lead announcer: Joe Moore; Announcer: Jeff Striegle; Announcer: Rusty Wallace | Backstretch: Mike Bagley | Kim Coon; Alex Hayden; Glenn Jarrett |

== Standings after the race ==
Drivers' Championship standings

| | Pos | Driver | Points |
|---|---|---|---|
| | 1 | Kevin Harvick | 418 |
| | 2 | Kyle Busch | 397 (–21) |
| 2 | 3 | Kurt Busch | 386 (–32) |
| 1 | 4 | Carl Edwards | 381 (–37) |
| 1 | 5 | Jimmie Johnson | 370 (–48) |
| | 6 | Brad Keselowski | 368 (–50) |
| 4 | 7 | Chase Elliott (R) | 341 (–77) |
| 1 | 8 | Joey Logano | 340 (–78) |
| 1 | 9 | Martin Truex Jr. | 336 (–82) |
| 2 | 10 | Austin Dillon | 315 (–103) |
| 2 | 11 | Dale Earnhardt Jr. | 314 (–104) |
| 2 | 12 | Matt Kenseth | 313 (–105) |
| | 13 | Denny Hamlin | 308 (–110) |
| 2 | 14 | Jamie McMurray | 296 (–122) |
| | 15 | Ryan Blaney (R) | 288 (–130) |
| 1 | 16 | A.J. Allmendinger | 283 (–135) |
Official driver's standings

Manufacturers' Championship standings

| Pos | Manufacturer | Points |
|---|---|---|
| 1 | Toyota | 508 |
| 2 | Chevrolet | 483 (–25) |
| 3 | Ford | 440 (–68) |
Official manufacturers' standings

- Note: Only the first 16 positions are included for the driver standings.
  . – Driver has clinched a Chase position.

| Previous race: 2016 Go Bowling 400 | Sprint Cup Series; 2016 season | Next race: 2016 Coca-Cola 600 |
