= 2016 Good Sam 500 =

Race details
- Race 4 of 36 in the 2016 NASCAR Sprint Cup Series
- Date: March 13, 2016
- Location: Phoenix International Raceway in Avondale, Arizona
- Course: Permanent racing facility
- Course length: 1 miles (1.609 km)
- Distance: 313 laps, 313 mi (503.725 km)
- Scheduled distance: 312 laps, 312 mi (502.115 km)
- Weather: Sunny, clear blue skies with a temperature of 70 °F (21 °C); wind out of the southwest at 4 mph (6.4 km/h)
- Average speed: 113.212 mph (182.197 km/h)

Pole position
Driver	Kyle Busch	Joe Gibbs Racing
- Time: 26.014

Most laps led
Driver	Kevin Harvick	Stewart–Haas Racing
- Laps: 139

Winner
No. 4	Kevin Harvick	Stewart–Haas Racing

Television in the United States
- Network: Fox
- Announcers: Mike Joy, Jeff Gordon and Darrell Waltrip
- Nielsen ratings: 3.6/8 (Overnight); 4.0/9 (Final); 6.6 million viewers

Radio in the United States
- Radio: MRN
- Booth announcers: Joe Moore, Jeff Striegle and Rusty Wallace
- Turn announcers: Dave Moody (1 & 2) and Kyle Rickey (3 & 4)

The 2016 Good Sam 500 was a NASCAR Sprint Cup Series race held on March 13, 2016, at Phoenix International Raceway in Avondale, Arizona. Contested over 313 laps, extended from 312 laps due to overtime, on the 1-mile (1.6-kilometre) asphalt oval, it was the fourth race of the 2016 NASCAR Sprint Cup Series season. Kevin Harvick won the race ahead of Carl Edwards, with Denny Hamlin, Kyle Busch and Dale Earnhardt Jr. rounding out the top five positions.

Busch won the pole for the race and led 75 laps on his way to a fourth-place finish. Harvick led a race high of 139 laps on his way to winning the race. There were seven lead changes among four different drivers, as well as five caution flag periods for 30 laps.

This was Harvick's 32nd career victory, first of the season, eighth at Phoenix International Raceway and fifth at the track for Stewart–Haas Racing. With the win, he moved up to first in the points standings. Chevrolet moved to first in the manufacturer standings.

The Good Sam 500 was carried by Fox Sports on the broadcast Fox network for the American television audience. The radio broadcast for the race was carried by the Motor Racing Network and Sirius XM NASCAR Radio.

== Report ==
=== Background ===
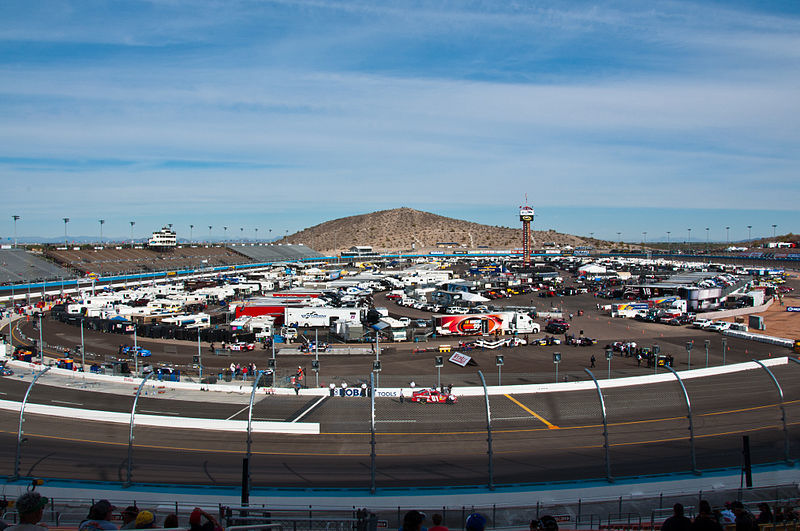
Phoenix International Raceway was the site of the fourth race of the season

Phoenix International Raceway, also known as PIR, is a 1-mile (1.6-kilometre) low-banked tri-oval race track located in Avondale, Arizona.

=== Entry list ===
The entry list for the Good Sam 500 was released on Monday, March 7 at 9:11 a.m. Eastern time. Thirty-nine cars are entered for the race. The only driver changes for this weekend's race were Ty Dillon returning to the seat of the No. 14 Stewart–Haas Racing Chevrolet and Joey Gase taking over the No. 32 Go FAS Racing Ford.

No.	Driver	Team	Manufacturer
1	Jamie McMurray	Chip Ganassi Racing	Chevrolet
2	Brad Keselowski	Team Penske	Ford
3	Austin Dillon	Richard Childress Racing	Chevrolet
4	Kevin Harvick	Stewart–Haas Racing	Chevrolet
5	Kasey Kahne	Hendrick Motorsports	Chevrolet
6	Trevor Bayne	Roush Fenway Racing	Ford
7	Regan Smith	Tommy Baldwin Racing	Chevrolet
10	Danica Patrick	Stewart–Haas Racing	Chevrolet
11	Denny Hamlin	Joe Gibbs Racing	Toyota
13	Casey Mears	Germain Racing	Chevrolet
14	Ty Dillon (i)	Stewart–Haas Racing	Chevrolet
15	Clint Bowyer	HScott Motorsports	Chevrolet
16	Greg Biffle	Roush Fenway Racing	Ford
17	Ricky Stenhouse Jr.	Roush Fenway Racing	Ford
18	Kyle Busch	Joe Gibbs Racing	Toyota
19	Carl Edwards	Joe Gibbs Racing	Toyota
20	Matt Kenseth	Joe Gibbs Racing	Toyota
21	Ryan Blaney (R)	Wood Brothers Racing	Ford
22	Joey Logano	Team Penske	Ford
23	David Ragan	BK Racing	Toyota
24	Chase Elliott (R)	Hendrick Motorsports	Chevrolet
27	Paul Menard	Richard Childress Racing	Chevrolet
30	Josh Wise	The Motorsports Group	Chevrolet
31	Ryan Newman	Richard Childress Racing	Chevrolet
32	Joey Gase (i)	Go FAS Racing	Ford
34	Chris Buescher (R)	Front Row Motorsports	Ford
38	Landon Cassill	Front Row Motorsports	Ford
41	Kurt Busch	Stewart–Haas Racing	Chevrolet
42	Kyle Larson	Chip Ganassi Racing	Chevrolet
43	Aric Almirola	Richard Petty Motorsports	Ford
44	Brian Scott (R)	Richard Petty Motorsports	Ford
46	Michael Annett	HScott Motorsports	Chevrolet
47	A. J. Allmendinger	JTG Daugherty Racing	Chevrolet
48	Jimmie Johnson	Hendrick Motorsports	Chevrolet
78	Martin Truex Jr.	Furniture Row Racing	Toyota
83	Matt DiBenedetto	BK Racing	Toyota
88	Dale Earnhardt Jr.	Hendrick Motorsports	Chevrolet
95	Michael McDowell	Circle Sport – Leavine Family Racing	Chevrolet
98	Cole Whitt	Premium Motorsports	Chevrolet
Official entry list

== Practice ==
=== First practice ===
Kurt Busch was the fastest in the first practice session with a time of 25.928 and a speed of 138.846 mph (223.451 km/h).

Pos	No.	Driver	Team	Manufacturer	Time	Speed
1	41	Kurt Busch	Stewart–Haas Racing	Chevrolet	25.928	138.846
2	11	Denny Hamlin	Joe Gibbs Racing	Toyota	25.999	138.467
3	22	Joey Logano	Team Penske	Ford	26.039	138.254
Official first practice results

=== Second practice ===
Kurt Busch was the fastest in the second practice session with a time of 26.194 and a speed of 137.436 mph (221.182 km/h). During the session, Michael Annett suffered a front-end lockup and slammed the wall in turn 1. Because this required him to go to a backup car, he'll start from the rear of the field. He said that "the car just didn’t want to turn. I don’t know if we were on the splitter or if we cut down a right-front (tire). ... I cranked on the wheel and it wouldn’t go straight.”

Pos	No.	Driver	Team	Manufacturer	Time	Speed
1	41	Kurt Busch	Stewart–Haas Racing	Chevrolet	26.194	137.436
2	4	Kevin Harvick	Stewart–Haas Racing	Chevrolet	26.338	136.685
3	19	Carl Edwards	Joe Gibbs Racing	Toyota	26.375	136.493
Official second practice results

=== Final practice ===
Kevin Harvick was fastest in the final practice session with a time of 26.409 and a speed of 136.317 mph (219.381 km/h).

Pos	No.	Driver	Team	Manufacturer	Time	Speed
1	4	Kevin Harvick	Stewart–Haas Racing	Chevrolet	26.409	136.317
2	41	Kurt Busch	Stewart–Haas Racing	Chevrolet	26.437	136.173
3	18	Kyle Busch	Joe Gibbs Racing	Toyota	26.452	136.096
Official final practice results

== Qualifying ==
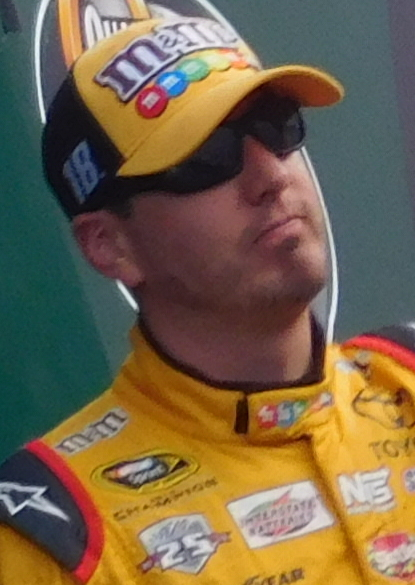
Kyle Busch scored the pole position.

Kyle Busch scored the pole for the race with a time of 26.014 and a speed of 138.387 mph (222.712 km/h). He said afterwards that he "cooled everything back down to make sure we gave it everything we got. We just made a couple of fine-tuning adjustments from what we ran before and it was a tick faster, not much, just a tick.” Jimmie Johnson and Kasey Kahne will both go to backup cars after mishaps in qualifying with the former crashing out and the latter changing engines. Johnson said after being released from the infield care center that the car was "a lot of straight in an area of the track that I didn't need to have straight. We'll have to get to the bottom of it. Just a really hard impact to the outside wall. Thankful that we have SAFER barriers and soft walls. But very disappointed because we had such a fast race car." He later took to Twitter to say that the wreck was because his steering wheel came off.

=== Qualifying results ===
Pos	No.	Driver	Team	Manufacturer	R1	R2	R3
1	18	Kyle Busch	Joe Gibbs Racing	Toyota	26.288	26.087	26.014
2	19	Carl Edwards	Joe Gibbs Racing	Toyota	26.363	26.093	26.179
3	11	Denny Hamlin	Joe Gibbs Racing	Toyota	26.331	26.079	26.196
4	41	Kurt Busch	Stewart–Haas Racing	Chevrolet	26.175	26.146	26.202
5	48	Jimmie Johnson	Hendrick Motorsports	Chevrolet	26.249	26.218	26.244
6	20	Matt Kenseth	Joe Gibbs Racing	Toyota	26.405	26.124	26.244
7	42	Kyle Larson	Chip Ganassi Racing	Chevrolet	26.327	26.203	26.271
8	78	Martin Truex Jr.	Furniture Row Racing	Toyota	26.231	26.221	26.290
9	22	Joey Logano	Team Penske	Ford	26.290	26.114	26.321
10	17	Ricky Stenhouse Jr.	Roush Fenway Racing	Ford	26.304	26.223	26.325
11	1	Jamie McMurray	Chip Ganassi Racing	Chevrolet	26.451	26.218	26.363
12	21	Ryan Blaney (R)	Wood Brothers Racing	Ford	26.252	26.223	26.411
13	16	Greg Biffle	Roush Fenway Racing	Ford	26.395	26.230	—
14	43	Aric Almirola	Richard Petty Motorsports	Ford	26.408	26.236	—
15	3	Austin Dillon	Richard Childress Racing	Chevrolet	26.387	26.260	—
16	27	Paul Menard	Richard Childress Racing	Chevrolet	26.324	26.272	—
17	24	Chase Elliott (R)	Hendrick Motorsports	Chevrolet	26.423	26.283	—
18	4	Kevin Harvick	Stewart–Haas Racing	Chevrolet	26.383	26.298	—
19	2	Brad Keselowski	Team Penske	Ford	26.304	26.306	—
20	31	Ryan Newman	Richard Childress Racing	Chevrolet	26.485	26.359	—
21	6	Trevor Bayne	Roush Fenway Racing	Ford	26.405	26.373	—
22	47	A. J. Allmendinger	JTG Daugherty Racing	Chevrolet	26.428	26.376	—
23	83	Matt DiBenedetto	BK Racing	Toyota	26.391	26.394	—
24	5	Kasey Kahne	Hendrick Motorsports	Chevrolet	26.241	0.000	—
25	13	Casey Mears	Germain Racing	Chevrolet	26.561	—	—
26	88	Dale Earnhardt Jr.	Hendrick Motorsports	Chevrolet	26.563	—	—
27	38	Landon Cassill	Front Row Motorsports	Ford	26.589	—	—
28	14	Ty Dillon (i)	Stewart–Haas Racing	Chevrolet	26.594	—	—
29	23	David Ragan	BK Racing	Toyota	26.626	—	—
30	44	Brian Scott (R)	Richard Petty Motorsports	Ford	26.683	—	—
31	7	Regan Smith	Tommy Baldwin Racing	Chevrolet	26.763	—	—
32	34	Chris Buescher (R)	Front Row Motorsports	Ford	26.780	—	—
33	95	Michael McDowell	Circle Sport – Leavine Family Racing	Chevrolet	26.852	—	—
34	98	Cole Whitt	Premium Motorsports	Chevrolet	26.932	—	—
35	15	Clint Bowyer	HScott Motorsports	Chevrolet	27.053	—	—
36	10	Danica Patrick	Stewart–Haas Racing	Chevrolet	27.089	—	—
37	30	Josh Wise	The Motorsports Group	Chevrolet	27.109	—	—
38	46	Michael Annett	HScott Motorsports	Chevrolet	27.115	—	—
39	32	Joey Gase (i)	Go FAS Racing	Ford	27.161	—	—

== Race ==
=== First half ===
==== Start ====
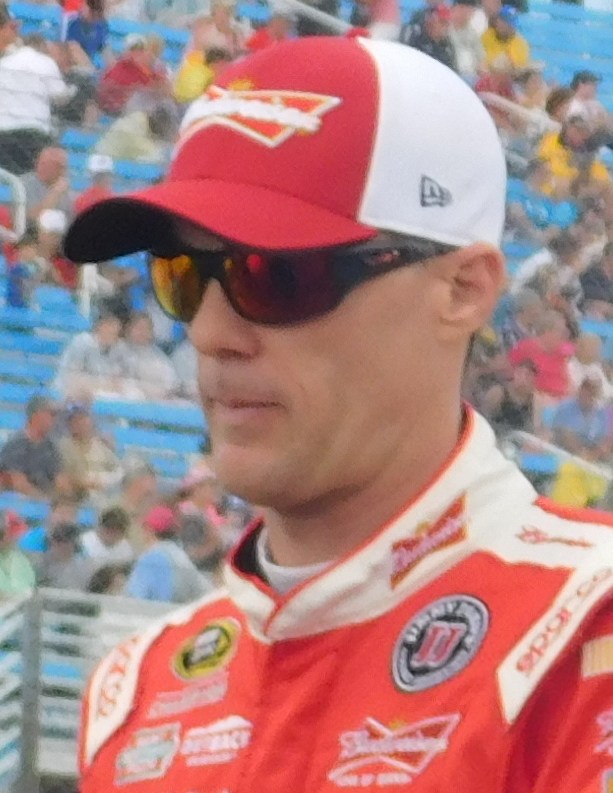
Kevin Harvick won the race.

Under clear blue Arizona skies, Kyle Busch led the field to the green flag at 3:49 p.m. After 10 laps, he pulled to a one-second lead over teammate Carl Edwards. The first caution of the race flew on lap 52 for a single-car wreck in turn 3. Going into the turn, Ryan Newman suffered a right-front tire blowout and slammed the wall. He would go on to finish last for the first time since 2008. He said he "just blew a right-front tire. It must have melted the bead or something. I don’t know if something failed in the cooling department or what the deal was. I didn’t do anything any different than I’ve ever done here before. Just definitely blew a right-front tire out and that was the end of our day with the Grainger Chevrolet.” Denny Hamlin was tagged for an uncontrolled tire and restarted the race from the tail-end of the field.

The race restarted on lap 60. Unlike the first run, he didn't pull away from the field. After taking just right-side tires on the first pit stop, he began losing his lead to Dale Earnhardt Jr. who took four. Earnhardt passed him in turn 3 to take the lead on lap 76. The second caution of the race flew on lap 104 for a single-car wreck in turn 3. Going into the turn, Paul Menard suffered a right-front tire blowout and slammed the wall. When asked what happened, he said he wasn't “really sure. We were okay that last run. We fired off pretty decent and started getting really tight at the end. I don’t know if a left-front tire blew or what going into 3. I don’t know if something broke or if a tire blew. We are going to check it out. I’m curious about it.” Edwards exited pit road with the race lead. Brian Scott was tagged for speeding on pit road and restarted the race from the tail-end of the field.

==== Second quarter ====
The race restarted on lap 113. After pulling away from the field, Edwards began losing his lead to teammate Kyle Busch. The third caution of the race flew on lap 163 for a single-car wreck in turn 1. Going into turn 1, Ricky Stenhouse Jr. suffered a right-front tire blowout and slammed the wall. He said he was "really tight and I was having to use too much brake and I think we got the tires hot and once we did that the right front gave out from having to use too much brake. The cars were a handful. They were fun to drive. We just didn’t quite have the Fastenal Ford dialed in like we needed to today. We were really tight, therefore, we had to use too much brake.” Kyle Busch exited pit road 18th after overshooting his pit box and stopping too close to the pit wall.

=== Second half ===
==== Halfway ====
The race restarted at lap 169. Kevin Harvick powered ahead of Edwards on the restart and took the lead. On lap 180, Harvick led his nine-thousandth career lap in Sprint Cup Series competition. Debris on the backstretch brought out the fourth caution of the race with 87 laps to go. The debris came from the shredded right-rear tire of Brad Keselowski's car. Edwards beat Harvick off pit road.

==== Fourth quarter ====
The race restarted with 78 laps to go. Harvick had no difficulty retaking the lead from Edwards going into turn 1. Joey Logano pitted from ninth with seven to go because he was short on fuel. The fifth caution of the race flew with six laps to go for a single-car wreck in turn 4. Rounding the turn, Kasey Kahne suffered a right-front tire blowout and slammed the wall. He said he "had a right front tire go down. It happened earlier in the race but a caution came out and I thought it was the engine at the time because of the way it kind of vibrated and changed the tone of the engine. Come to find out it wasn’t the engine and it was the tire. We’ll look at what we are doing since it happened a couple of times. We had a car capable of running in the top-15 and we were really good early. The longer the race went I felt like I got looser. I used a lot of brake during the entire the race, which I was surprised about. Yesterday in practice I didn’t have to use the brake hardly at all and today with different grips I used it so much.” Harvick, Earnhardt and Austin Dillon opted to stay out while the rest of the field opted to pit.

===== Overtime =====
The race restarted with two laps to go at an overtime finish, Harvick led the field to the green with Carl Edwards at his back. After the white flag, Harvick and Edwards battled for the lead, bumping each other until Harvick came out victorious by 0.010 seconds, the closest finish in Phoenix history.

== Post-race ==
=== Driver comments ===
Harvick said that he "knew he (Edwards) was better through (Turns) 3 and 4, but that was not the car I wanted to see behind me. I tried to protect the bottom in 3 and 4, and I just missed the bottom with all the rubber built up on the tires. I knew I was going to be on defense down there. I got up too high ... and then he got into me, like he should have. I knew I needed to get a good run off the corner and I was going to have to get into his door. And it worked out, just barely.“

Edwards said that Harvick "was pretty fast, even on old tires. Once we got clear, I thought we were going to get one shot. I tried to go to the outside of him and he blocked a little bit, and I didn't have anywhere to go but rub him a little bit." He joked that he "should’ve wrecked him. No, those guys were doing a great job all day. They hung on with those tires but we were faster so I thought, ‘Man, I’ll just move him out of the way and get by.’ I just didn't move him far enough and then he got up the door and I thought I was trying to time—I thought ‘I think he’s going to beat me.’ So, I tried to sideswipe him before he got there but I needed to be in front of his front tire. Anyway, just a fun race.”

Hamlin said he "was actually rooting on Carl going, ‘Get him.’ But, we’ve been on the other side of that photo finish. This rules package creates this kind of racing and some of the finishes that we’ve seen so far this year.”

== Race results ==
Pos	No.	Driver	Team	Manufacturer	Laps	Points
1	4	Kevin Harvick	Stewart–Haas Racing	Chevrolet	313	45
2	19	Carl Edwards	Joe Gibbs Racing	Toyota	313	40
3	11	Denny Hamlin	Joe Gibbs Racing	Toyota	313	38
4	18	Kyle Busch	Joe Gibbs Racing	Toyota	313	38
5	88	Dale Earnhardt Jr.	Hendrick Motorsports	Chevrolet	313	37
6	41	Kurt Busch	Stewart–Haas Racing	Chevrolet	313	35
7	20	Matt Kenseth	Joe Gibbs Racing	Toyota	313	34
8	24	Chase Elliott (R)	Hendrick Motorsports	Chevrolet	313	33
9	3	Austin Dillon	Richard Childress Racing	Chevrolet	313	32
10	21	Ryan Blaney (R)	Wood Brothers Racing	Ford	313	31
11	48	Jimmie Johnson	Hendrick Motorsports	Chevrolet	313	30
12	42	Kyle Larson	Chip Ganassi Racing	Chevrolet	313	29
13	43	Aric Almirola	Richard Petty Motorsports	Ford	313	28
14	78	Martin Truex Jr.	Furniture Row Racing	Toyota	313	27
15	14	Ty Dillon (i)	Stewart–Haas Racing	Chevrolet	313	0
16	1	Jamie McMurray	Chip Ganassi Racing	Chevrolet	313	25
17	47	A. J. Allmendinger	JTG Daugherty Racing	Chevrolet	313	24
18	22	Joey Logano	Team Penske	Ford	312	23
19	10	Danica Patrick	Stewart–Haas Racing	Chevrolet	312	22
20	83	Matt DiBenedetto	BK Racing	Toyota	312	21
21	16	Greg Biffle	Roush Fenway Racing	Ford	312	20
22	5	Kasey Kahne	Hendrick Motorsports	Chevrolet	312	19
23	6	Trevor Bayne	Roush Fenway Racing	Ford	311	18
24	23	David Ragan	BK Racing	Toyota	309	17
25	38	Landon Cassill	Front Row Motorsports	Ford	308	16
26	95	Michael McDowell	Circle Sport – Leavine Family Racing	Chevrolet	308	15
27	44	Brian Scott (R)	Richard Petty Motorsports	Ford	308	14
28	7	Regan Smith	Tommy Baldwin Racing	Chevrolet	308	13
29	2	Brad Keselowski	Team Penske	Ford	307	12
30	34	Chris Buescher (R)	Front Row Motorsports	Ford	307	11
31	15	Clint Bowyer	HScott Motorsports	Chevrolet	307	10
32	32	Joey Gase (i)	Go FAS Racing	Ford	305	0
33	46	Michael Annett	HScott Motorsports	Chevrolet	303	8
34	30	Josh Wise	The Motorsports Group	Chevrolet	303	7
35	13	Casey Mears	Germain Racing	Chevrolet	288	6
36	98	Cole Whitt	Premium Motorsports	Chevrolet	236	5
37	17	Ricky Stenhouse Jr.	Roush Fenway Racing	Ford	161	4
38	27	Paul Menard	Richard Childress Racing	Chevrolet	104	3
39	31	Ryan Newman	Richard Childress Racing	Chevrolet	51	2
Official race results

=== Race summary ===
- Lead changes: 7
- Cautions/Laps: 5 for 30
- Red flags: 0
- Time of race: 2 hours, 45 minutes and 53 seconds
- Average speed: 113.212 miles per hour (182.197 km/h)

== Media ==
=== Television ===
Fox Sports covered their 12th race at Phoenix International Raceway. Mike Joy, two-time Phoenix winner Jeff Gordon and Darrell Waltrip called the race from the commentary booth, with Jamie Little, Vince Welch and Matt Yocum covering pit road duties for the television side.

Fox
Booth announcers	Pit reporters
Lap-by-lap: Mike Joy; Color commentator: Jeff Gordon; Color commentator: Darrell Waltrip	Jamie Little; Vince Welch; Matt Yocum

=== Radio ===
MRN had the radio call for the race which was also simulcast on SiriusXM's NASCAR Radio channel. Joe Moore, Jeff Striegle and 1998 Dura Lube/Kmart 500 winner Rusty Wallace called the race from the booth when the field was racing down the front stretch. Dave Moody called the race from atop the stands in turn 1 when the field was racing through turns 1 and 2, and Kyle Rickey called the race from a billboard outside turn 4 when the field was racing through turns 3 and 4. Pit road duties were covered by Alex Hayden, Glenn Jarrett and Steve Post.

MRN
Booth announcers	Turn announcers	Pit reporters
Lead announcer: Joe Moore; Announcer: Jeff Striegle; Announcer: Rusty Wallace	Turns 1 & 2: Dave Moody; Turns 3 & 4: Kyle Rickey	Alex Hayden; Glenn Jarrett; Steve Post

== Standings after the race ==
Drivers' Championship standings

	Pos	Driver	Points
2	1	Kevin Harvick	154
1	2	Kyle Busch	154
1	3	Jimmie Johnson	140 (–14)
1	4	Kurt Busch	137 (–17)
2	5	Carl Edwards	136 (–18)
2	6	Denny Hamlin	131 (–23)
3	7	Joey Logano	127 (–27)
2	8	Austin Dillon	122 (–32)
	9	Martin Truex Jr.	117 (–37)
2	10	Dale Earnhardt Jr.	115 (–39)
5	11	Brad Keselowski	110 (–44)
2	12	Ryan Blaney (R)	104 (–50)
2	13	Aric Almirola	100 (–54)
1	14	Kasey Kahne	96 (–58)
1	15	Jamie McMurray	94 (–60)
6	16	Matt Kenseth	90 (–64)
Official driver's standings

Manufacturers' Championship standings

	Pos	Manufacturer	Points
1	1	Chevrolet	166
1	2	Toyota	162 (–4)
	3	Ford	142 (–24)
Official manufacturers' standings

- Note: Only the first 16 positions are included for the driver standings.

Previous race: 2016 Kobalt 400	Sprint Cup Series; 2016 season	Next race: 2016 Auto Club 400
