= 1998 AC Delco 400 =

32nd race of the 1998 NASCAR Winston Cup Series

Race details
- Race 32 of 33 in the 1998 NASCAR Winston Cup Series
- The 1998 AC Delco 400 program cover, featuring Dale Earnhardt Jr. and Dale Earnhardt.
- Date: November 1, 1998
- Official name: 34th Annual AC Delco 400
- Location: Rockingham, North Carolina, North Carolina Speedway
- Course: Permanent racing facility
- Course length: 1.017 miles (1.636 km)
- Distance: 393 laps, 399.681 mi (643.224 km)
- Average speed: 128.423 miles per hour (206.677 km/h)

Pole position
Driver	Mark Martin	Roush Racing
- Time: 23.394

Most laps led
Driver	Dale Jarrett	Robert Yates Racing
- Laps: 195

Winner
No. 24	Jeff Gordon	Hendrick Motorsports

Television in the United States
- Network: TNN
- Announcers: Eli Gold, Buddy Baker, Dick Berggren

Radio in the United States
- Radio: Motor Racing Network

The 1998 AC Delco 400 was the 32nd stock car race of the 1998 NASCAR Winston Cup Series and the 34th iteration of the event. The race was held on Sunday, November 1, 1998, in Rockingham, North Carolina, at North Carolina Speedway, a 1.017 miles (1.637 km) permanent high-banked racetrack. The race took the scheduled 393 laps to complete. In the final laps of the race, Hendrick Motorsports driver Jeff Gordon would manage to make a late race pass on Penske-Kranefuss Racing driver Rusty Wallace to take his 41st career NASCAR Winston Cup Series victory and his 12th victory of the season.

In the process, Jeff Gordon would manage to clinch his third career NASCAR Winston Cup Series championship, completing a dominant and historic run.

== Background ==
The layout of North Carolina Speedway, the venue where the race was held.

North Carolina Speedway was opened as a flat, one-mile oval on October 31, 1965. In 1969, the track was extensively reconfigured to a high-banked, D-shaped oval just over one mile in length. In 1997, North Carolina Motor Speedway merged with Penske Motorsports, and was renamed North Carolina Speedway. Shortly thereafter, the infield was reconfigured, and competition on the infield road course, mostly by the SCCA, was discontinued. Currently, the track is home to the Fast Track High Performance Driving School.

=== Entry list ===
- (R) denotes rookie driver.

#	Driver	Team	Make
1	Steve Park (R)	Dale Earnhardt, Inc.	Chevrolet
2	Rusty Wallace	Penske-Kranefuss Racing	Ford
3	Dale Earnhardt	Richard Childress Racing	Chevrolet
4	Bobby Hamilton	Morgan–McClure Motorsports	Chevrolet
5	Terry Labonte	Hendrick Motorsports	Chevrolet
6	Mark Martin	Roush Racing	Ford
7	Geoff Bodine	Mattei Motorsports	Ford
9	Jerry Nadeau (R)	Melling Racing	Ford
10	Ricky Rudd	Rudd Performance Motorsports	Ford
11	Brett Bodine	Brett Bodine Racing	Ford
12	Jeremy Mayfield	Penske-Kranefuss Racing	Ford
13	Ted Musgrave	Elliott-Marino Racing	Ford
16	Kevin Lepage (R)	Roush Racing	Ford
18	Bobby Labonte	Joe Gibbs Racing	Pontiac
21	Michael Waltrip	Wood Brothers Racing	Ford
22	Ward Burton	Bill Davis Racing	Pontiac
23	Jimmy Spencer	Travis Carter Enterprises	Ford
24	Jeff Gordon	Hendrick Motorsports	Chevrolet
26	Johnny Benson Jr.	Roush Racing	Ford
28	Kenny Irwin Jr. (R)	Robert Yates Racing	Ford
30	Derrike Cope	Bahari Racing	Pontiac
31	Mike Skinner	Richard Childress Racing	Chevrolet
33	Ken Schrader	Andy Petree Racing	Chevrolet
35	Darrell Waltrip	Tyler Jet Motorsports	Pontiac
36	Ernie Irvan	MB2 Motorsports	Pontiac
40	Sterling Marlin	Team SABCO	Chevrolet
41	David Green	Larry Hedrick Motorsports	Chevrolet
42	Joe Nemechek	Team SABCO	Chevrolet
43	John Andretti	Petty Enterprises	Pontiac
44	Kyle Petty	Petty Enterprises	Pontiac
46	Jeff Green	Team SABCO	Chevrolet
50	Wally Dallenbach Jr.	Hendrick Motorsports	Chevrolet
71	Dave Marcis	Marcis Auto Racing	Chevrolet
75	Rick Mast	Butch Mock Motorsports	Ford
77	Ted Musgrave	Jasper Motorsports	Ford
78	Gary Bradberry	Triad Motorsports	Ford
80	Andy Hillenburg	Hover Motorsports	Ford
81	Kenny Wallace	FILMAR Racing	Ford
88	Dale Jarrett	Robert Yates Racing	Ford
90	Dick Trickle	Donlavey Racing	Ford
91	Todd Bodine	LJ Racing	Chevrolet
94	Bill Elliott	Elliott-Marino Racing	Ford
96	Steve Grissom	American Equipment Racing	Chevrolet
97	Chad Little	Roush Racing	Ford
98	Rich Bickle	Cale Yarborough Motorsports	Ford
99	Jeff Burton	Roush Racing	Ford

== Practice ==
=== First practice ===
The first practice session was held on Friday, October 30, at 10:00 AM EST. The session would last for one hour and 25 minutes. Rusty Wallace, driving for Penske-Kranefuss Racing, would set the fastest time in the session, with a lap of 23.550 and an average speed of 155.465 mph (250.197 km/h).

Pos.	#	Driver	Team	Make	Time	Speed
1	2	Rusty Wallace	Penske-Kranefuss Racing	Ford	23.550	155.465
2	6	Mark Martin	Roush Racing	Ford	23.615	155.037
3	24	Jeff Gordon	Hendrick Motorsports	Chevrolet	23.716	154.377
Full first practice results

=== Final practice ===
The final practice session was held on Saturday, October 31. The session would last for one hour. Jeff Burton, driving for Roush Racing, would set the fastest time in the session, with a lap of 24.318 and an average speed of 150.555 mph (242.295 km/h).

Pos.	#	Driver	Team	Make	Time	Speed
1	99	Jeff Burton	Roush Racing	Ford	24.318	150.555
2	6	Mark Martin	Roush Racing	Ford	24.341	150.412
3	88	Dale Jarrett	Robert Yates Racing	Ford	24.345	150.388
Full Happy Hour practice results

== Qualifying ==
Qualifying was split into two rounds. The first round was held on Friday, October 30, at 2:00 PM EST. Each driver would have one lap to set a time. During the first round, the top 25 drivers in the round would be guaranteed a starting spot in the race. If a driver was not able to guarantee a spot in the first round, they had the option to scrub their time from the first round and try and run a faster lap time in a second round qualifying run, held on Saturday, October 31, at 9:30 AM EST. As with the first round, each driver would have one lap to set a time. On January 24, 1998, NASCAR would announce that the amount of provisionals given would be increased from last season. Positions 26-36 would be decided on time, while positions 37-43 would be based on provisionals. Six spots are awarded by the use of provisionals based on owner's points. The seventh is awarded to a past champion who has not otherwise qualified for the race. If no past champion needs the provisional, the next team in the owner points will be awarded a provisional.

Mark Martin, driving for Roush Racing, would win the pole, setting a time of 23.394 and an average speed of 156.502 miles per hour (251.866 km/h).

Three drivers would fail to qualify: Steve Grissom, Andy Hillenburg, and Dave Marcis.

=== Full qualifying results ===
Pos.	#	Driver	Team	Make	Time	Speed
1	6	Mark Martin	Roush Racing	Ford	23.394	156.502
2	26	Johnny Benson Jr.	Roush Racing	Ford	23.530	155.597
3	2	Rusty Wallace	Penske-Kranefuss Racing	Ford	23.544	155.505
4	88	Dale Jarrett	Robert Yates Racing	Ford	23.557	155.419
5	7	Geoff Bodine	Mattei Motorsports	Ford	23.575	155.300
6	12	Jeremy Mayfield	Penske-Kranefuss Racing	Ford	23.583	155.247
7	10	Ricky Rudd	Rudd Performance Motorsports	Ford	23.602	155.122
8	30	Derrike Cope	Bahari Racing	Pontiac	23.613	155.050
9	24	Jeff Gordon	Hendrick Motorsports	Chevrolet	23.627	154.958
10	43	John Andretti	Petty Enterprises	Pontiac	23.629	154.945
11	9	Jerry Nadeau (R)	Melling Racing	Ford	23.643	154.853
12	91	Todd Bodine	LJ Racing	Chevrolet	23.651	154.801
13	99	Jeff Burton	Roush Racing	Ford	23.658	154.755
14	33	Ken Schrader	Andy Petree Racing	Chevrolet	23.665	154.709
15	22	Ward Burton	Bill Davis Racing	Pontiac	23.693	154.527
16	42	Joe Nemechek	Team SABCO	Chevrolet	23.695	154.514
17	23	Jimmy Spencer	Travis Carter Enterprises	Ford	23.728	154.299
18	16	Kevin Lepage (R)	Roush Racing	Ford	23.728	154.299
19	18	Bobby Labonte	Joe Gibbs Racing	Pontiac	23.729	154.292
20	21	Michael Waltrip	Wood Brothers Racing	Ford	23.742	154.208
21	5	Terry Labonte	Hendrick Motorsports	Chevrolet	23.746	154.182
22	97	Chad Little	Roush Racing	Ford	23.746	154.182
23	44	Kyle Petty	Petty Enterprises	Pontiac	23.750	154.156
24	50	Wally Dallenbach Jr.	Hendrick Motorsports	Chevrolet	23.751	154.149
25	4	Bobby Hamilton	Morgan–McClure Motorsports	Chevrolet	23.759	154.097
26	94	Bill Elliott	Elliott-Marino Racing	Ford	23.749	154.162
27	78	Gary Bradberry	Triad Motorsports	Ford	23.775	153.994
28	31	Mike Skinner	Richard Childress Racing	Chevrolet	23.779	153.968
29	3	Dale Earnhardt	Richard Childress Racing	Chevrolet	23.787	153.916
30	40	Sterling Marlin	Team SABCO	Chevrolet	23.787	153.916
31	98	Rich Bickle	Cale Yarborough Motorsports	Ford	23.787	153.916
32	11	Brett Bodine	Brett Bodine Racing	Ford	23.792	153.884
33	28	Kenny Irwin Jr. (R)	Robert Yates Racing	Ford	23.806	153.793
34	81	Kenny Wallace	FILMAR Racing	Ford	23.818	153.716
35	75	Rick Mast	Butch Mock Motorsports	Ford	23.820	153.703
36	41	David Green	Larry Hedrick Motorsports	Chevrolet	23.820	153.703
Provisionals
37	36	Ricky Craven	MB2 Motorsports	Pontiac	-*	-*
38	1	Steve Park (R)	Dale Earnhardt, Inc.	Chevrolet	-*	-*
39	90	Dick Trickle	Donlavey Racing	Ford	-*	-*
40	77	Robert Pressley	Jasper Motorsports	Ford	-*	-*
41	13	Ted Musgrave	Elliott-Marino Racing	Ford	-*	-*
42	46	Jeff Green	Team SABCO	Chevrolet	-*	-*
Champion's Provisional
43	35	Darrell Waltrip	Tyler Jet Motorsports	Pontiac	-*	-*
Failed to qualify
44	96	Steve Grissom	American Equipment Racing	Chevrolet	24.094	151.955
45	80	Andy Hillenburg	Hover Motorsports	Ford	24.456	149.706
46	71	Dave Marcis	Marcis Auto Racing	Chevrolet	24.648	148.539
Official qualifying results

*Time not available.

== Race results ==
Fin	St	#	Driver	Team	Make	Laps	Led	Status	Pts	Winnings
1	9	24	Jeff Gordon	Hendrick Motorsports	Chevrolet	393	29	running	180	$111,575
2	4	88	Dale Jarrett	Robert Yates Racing	Ford	393	195	running	180	$80,625
3	3	2	Rusty Wallace	Penske-Kranefuss Racing	Ford	393	152	running	170	$49,275
4	1	6	Mark Martin	Roush Racing	Ford	393	1	running	165	$53,750
5	13	99	Jeff Burton	Roush Racing	Ford	393	1	running	160	$41,325
6	25	4	Bobby Hamilton	Morgan–McClure Motorsports	Chevrolet	393	0	running	150	$49,550
7	15	22	Ward Burton	Bill Davis Racing	Pontiac	393	0	running	146	$34,650
8	21	5	Terry Labonte	Hendrick Motorsports	Chevrolet	393	3	running	147	$36,500
9	29	3	Dale Earnhardt	Richard Childress Racing	Chevrolet	393	8	running	143	$34,400
10	7	10	Ricky Rudd	Rudd Performance Motorsports	Ford	393	0	running	134	$43,150
11	5	7	Geoff Bodine	Mattei Motorsports	Ford	392	0	running	130	$31,375
12	26	94	Bill Elliott	Elliott-Marino Racing	Ford	392	1	running	132	$29,850
13	30	40	Sterling Marlin	Team SABCO	Chevrolet	392	0	running	124	$21,975
14	14	33	Ken Schrader	Andy Petree Racing	Chevrolet	392	0	running	121	$29,825
15	19	18	Bobby Labonte	Joe Gibbs Racing	Pontiac	392	0	running	118	$34,125
16	34	81	Kenny Wallace	FILMAR Racing	Ford	392	0	running	115	$25,175
17	16	42	Joe Nemechek	Team SABCO	Chevrolet	391	0	running	112	$27,875
18	31	98	Rich Bickle	Cale Yarborough Motorsports	Ford	391	0	running	109	$16,575
19	41	13	Ted Musgrave	Elliott-Marino Racing	Ford	391	0	running	106	$16,400
20	12	91	Todd Bodine	LJ Racing	Chevrolet	391	0	running	103	$22,925
21	28	31	Mike Skinner	Richard Childress Racing	Chevrolet	391	0	running	100	$19,925
22	20	21	Michael Waltrip	Wood Brothers Racing	Ford	391	0	running	97	$26,375
23	39	90	Dick Trickle	Donlavey Racing	Ford	391	0	running	94	$26,175
24	11	9	Jerry Nadeau (R)	Melling Racing	Ford	391	0	running	91	$19,975
25	8	30	Derrike Cope	Bahari Racing	Pontiac	390	0	running	88	$25,775
26	36	41	David Green	Larry Hedrick Motorsports	Chevrolet	390	0	running	85	$22,275
27	42	46	Jeff Green	Team SABCO	Chevrolet	389	0	running	82	$18,475
28	27	78	Gary Bradberry	Triad Motorsports	Ford	389	0	running	79	$15,575
29	6	12	Jeremy Mayfield	Penske-Kranefuss Racing	Ford	388	0	running	76	$25,175
30	17	23	Jimmy Spencer	Travis Carter Enterprises	Ford	388	2	running	78	$24,975
31	32	11	Brett Bodine	Brett Bodine Racing	Ford	388	0	running	70	$24,950
32	43	35	Darrell Waltrip	Tyler Jet Motorsports	Pontiac	388	0	running	67	$14,550
33	33	28	Kenny Irwin Jr. (R)	Robert Yates Racing	Ford	387	0	running	64	$29,650
34	10	43	John Andretti	Petty Enterprises	Pontiac	387	0	running	61	$29,350
35	38	1	Steve Park (R)	Dale Earnhardt, Inc.	Chevrolet	386	0	running	58	$17,250
36	24	50	Wally Dallenbach Jr.	Hendrick Motorsports	Chevrolet	381	0	running	55	$23,725
37	37	36	Ricky Craven	MB2 Motorsports	Pontiac	360	0	running	52	$21,200
38	40	77	Robert Pressley	Jasper Motorsports	Ford	328	0	running	49	$14,200
39	23	44	Kyle Petty	Petty Enterprises	Pontiac	281	0	carburetor	46	$23,650
40	22	97	Chad Little	Roush Racing	Ford	257	0	radiator	43	$14,150
41	2	26	Johnny Benson Jr.	Roush Racing	Ford	229	1	engine	45	$21,400
42	35	75	Rick Mast	Butch Mock Motorsports	Ford	173	0	engine	37	$14,150
43	18	16	Kevin Lepage (R)	Roush Racing	Ford	67	0	water pump	34	$21,150
Official race results

Previous race: 1998 Dura Lube/Kmart 500	NASCAR Winston Cup Series; 1998 season	Next race: 1998 NAPA 500
