= 2016 Auto Club 400 =

Race details
- Race 5 of 36 in the 2016 NASCAR Sprint Cup Series
- Date: March 20, 2016
- Location: Auto Club Speedway in Fontana, California
- Course: Permanent racing facility
- Course length: 2 miles (3.219 km)
- Distance: 205 laps, 410 mi (659.831 km)
- Scheduled distance: 200 laps, 400 mi (643.738 km)
- Weather: Mostly sunny skies with a temperature of 73 °F (23 °C); wind out of the west/southwest at 6 mph (9.7 km/h)
- Average speed: 137.213 mph (220.823 km/h)

Pole position
Driver	Austin Dillon	Richard Childress Racing
- Time: 38.200

Most laps led
Driver	Kevin Harvick	Stewart–Haas Racing
- Laps: 142

Winner
No. 48	Jimmie Johnson	Hendrick Motorsports

Television in the United States
- Network: Fox
- Announcers: Mike Joy, Jeff Gordon and Darrell Waltrip
- Nielsen ratings: 3.5/9 (Overnight); 4.0/10 (Final); 6.8 million viewers

Radio in the United States
- Radio: MRN
- Booth announcers: Joe Moore, Jeff Striegle and Rusty Wallace
- Turn announcers: Dan Hubbard (1 & 2) and Kurt Becker (3 & 4)

The 2016 Auto Club 400 was a NASCAR Sprint Cup Series race held on March 20, 2016, at Auto Club Speedway in Fontana, California. Contested over 205 laps, it was fifth race of the 2016 NASCAR Sprint Cup Series season. Jimmie Johnson won the race ahead of Kevin Harvick, while Denny Hamlin, Joey Logano and Ricky Stenhouse Jr. rounded out the top five positions.

Austin Dillon won the pole, but lost the race lead on the opening lap and ultimately finished 24th. Harvick led a race high of 142 laps on his way to a runner-up finish. There were 26 lead changes among eight different drivers, as well as six caution flag periods for 33 laps.

This was the 77th career victory for Johnson, second of the season, sixth at Auto Club Speedway and 10th at the track for Hendrick Motorsports. The win moved Johnson up to second in the points standings. Chevrolet increased their lead to nine points over Toyota in the manufacturer standings.

The Auto Club 400 was carried by Fox Sports on the broadcast Fox network for the American television audience. The radio broadcast for the race was carried by the Motor Racing Network and Sirius XM NASCAR Radio.

== Report ==
=== Background ===
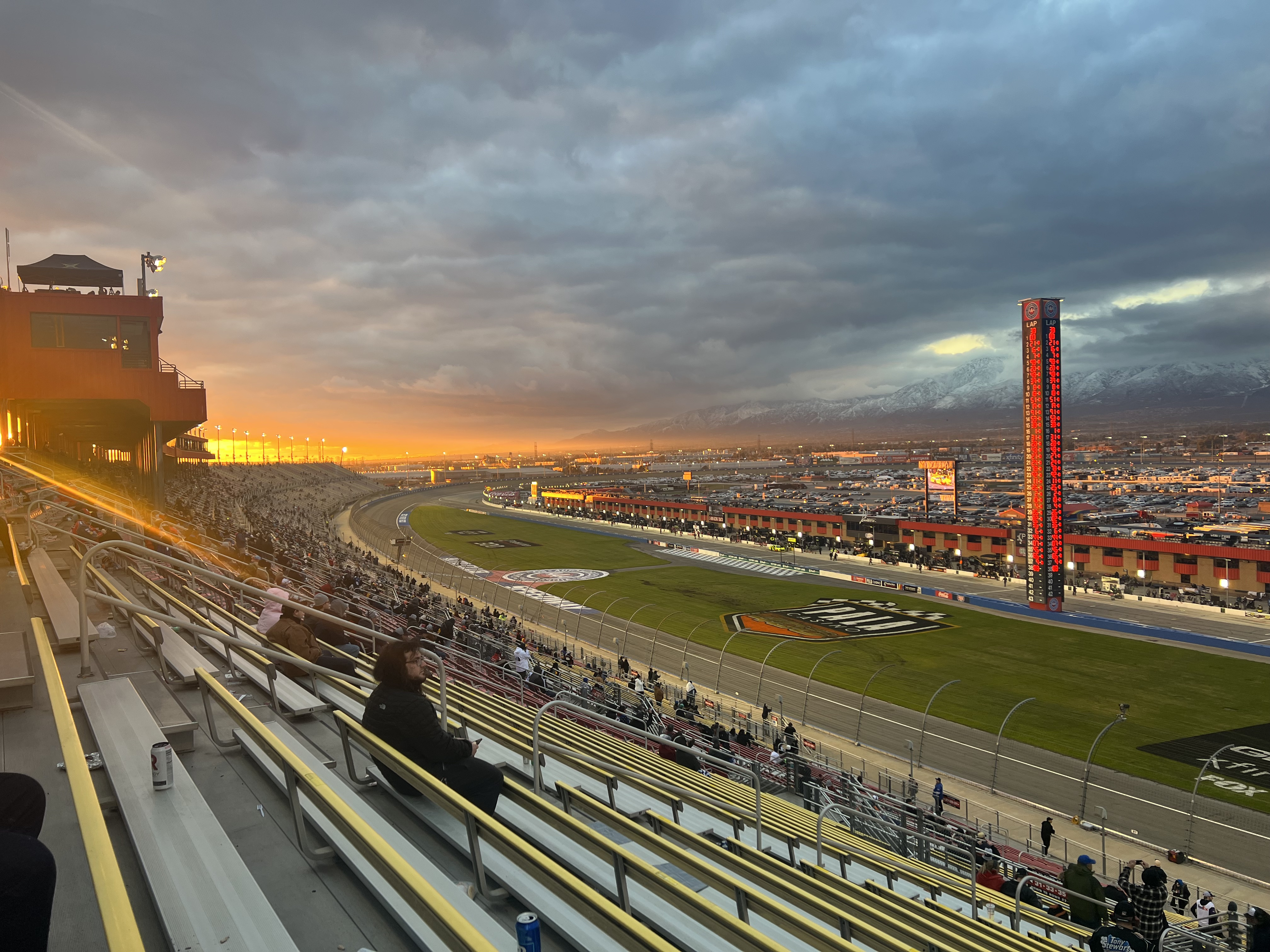
Auto Club Speedway, the track where the race was held.

Auto Club Speedway is a 2-mile (3.2-kilometre) low-banked, D-shaped oval superspeedway in Fontana, California.

=== Entry list ===
The entry list for the Auto Club 400 was released on Monday, March 14 at 3:25 p.m. Eastern time. Thirty-nine cars were entered for the race. Two driver changes from the previous race included Brian Vickers returning to the seat of the No. 14 Stewart–Haas Racing Chevrolet and Jeffrey Earnhardt returning to the No. 32 Go FAS Racing Ford.

No.	Driver	Team	Manufacturer
1	Jamie McMurray	Chip Ganassi Racing	Chevrolet
2	Brad Keselowski	Team Penske	Ford
3	Austin Dillon	Richard Childress Racing	Chevrolet
4	Kevin Harvick	Stewart–Haas Racing	Chevrolet
5	Kasey Kahne	Hendrick Motorsports	Chevrolet
6	Trevor Bayne	Roush Fenway Racing	Ford
7	Regan Smith	Tommy Baldwin Racing	Chevrolet
10	Danica Patrick	Stewart–Haas Racing	Chevrolet
11	Denny Hamlin	Joe Gibbs Racing	Toyota
13	Casey Mears	Germain Racing	Chevrolet
14	Brian Vickers	Stewart–Haas Racing	Chevrolet
15	Clint Bowyer	HScott Motorsports	Chevrolet
16	Greg Biffle	Roush Fenway Racing	Ford
17	Ricky Stenhouse Jr.	Roush Fenway Racing Paramount Pictures	Ford
18	Kyle Busch	Joe Gibbs Racing	Toyota
19	Carl Edwards	Joe Gibbs Racing	Toyota
20	Matt Kenseth	Joe Gibbs Racing	Toyota
21	Ryan Blaney (R)	Wood Brothers Racing	Ford
22	Joey Logano	Team Penske	Ford
23	David Ragan	BK Racing	Toyota
24	Chase Elliott (R)	Hendrick Motorsports	Chevrolet
27	Paul Menard	Richard Childress Racing	Chevrolet
30	Josh Wise	The Motorsports Group	Chevrolet
31	Ryan Newman	Richard Childress Racing	Chevrolet
32	Jeffrey Earnhardt (R)	Go FAS Racing	Ford
34	Chris Buescher (R)	Front Row Motorsports	Ford
38	Landon Cassill	Front Row Motorsports	Ford
41	Kurt Busch	Stewart–Haas Racing	Chevrolet
42	Kyle Larson	Chip Ganassi Racing	Chevrolet
43	Aric Almirola	Richard Petty Motorsports	Ford
44	Brian Scott (R)	Richard Petty Motorsports	Ford
46	Michael Annett	HScott Motorsports	Chevrolet
47	A. J. Allmendinger	JTG Daugherty Racing	Chevrolet
48	Jimmie Johnson	Hendrick Motorsports	Chevrolet
78	Martin Truex Jr.	Furniture Row Racing	Toyota
83	Matt DiBenedetto	BK Racing	Toyota
88	Dale Earnhardt Jr.	Hendrick Motorsports	Chevrolet
95	Michael McDowell	Circle Sport – Leavine Family Racing	Chevrolet
98	Cole Whitt	Premium Motorsports	Chevrolet
Official entry list

== Practice ==
=== First practice ===
Austin Dillon was the fastest in the first practice session with a time of 38.194 and a speed of 188.511 mph (303.379 km/h).

Pos	No.	Driver	Team	Manufacturer	Time	Speed
1	3	Austin Dillon	Richard Childress Racing	Chevrolet	38.194	188.511
2	78	Martin Truex Jr.	Furniture Row Racing	Toyota	38.210	188.432
3	4	Kevin Harvick	Stewart–Haas Racing	Chevrolet	38.236	188.304
Official first practice results

=== Second practice ===
Carl Edwards was the fastest in the second practice session with a time of 38.317 and a speed of 187.906 mph (302.405 km/h). Kurt Busch went to a backup car after slamming the wall in turn 3. Because this took place after qualifying, he'll start the race from the rear of the field.

Pos	No.	Driver	Team	Manufacturer	Time	Speed
1	19	Carl Edwards	Joe Gibbs Racing	Toyota	38.317	187.906
2	78	Martin Truex Jr.	Furniture Row Racing	Toyota	38.373	187.632
3	31	Ryan Newman	Richard Childress Racing	Chevrolet	38.577	186.640
Official second practice results

=== Final practice ===
Matt Kenseth was the fastest in the final practice session with a time of 38.831 and a speed of 185.419 mph (298.403 km/h). Greg Biffle and Kyle Larson made contact with each other exiting turn 4. Larson went to a backup car and will start from the rear of the field.

Pos	No.	Driver	Team	Manufacturer	Time	Speed
1	20	Matt Kenseth	Joe Gibbs Racing	Toyota	38.831	185.419
2	19	Carl Edwards	Joe Gibbs Racing	Toyota	38.846	185.347
3	21	Ryan Blaney (R)	Wood Brothers Racing	Ford	38.885	185.161
Official final practice results

== Qualifying ==
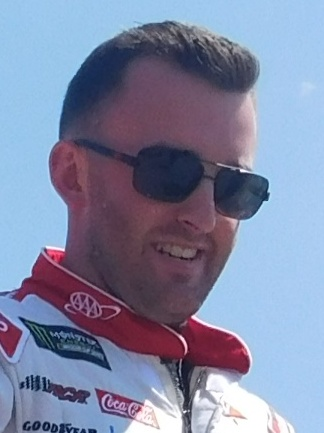
Austin Dillon scored the pole position.

Austin Dillon won the pole for the race with a time of 38.200 and a speed of 188.482 mph (303.332 km/h). Being his second career pole and first since the 2014 Daytona 500, he said he was glad he "got a pole somewhere else. To do it at a driver’s race track like this at Fontana it means a lot to me. Just proud of this American Ethanol team we’ve had fast cars all year long. I knew going into that third session if I didn’t make mistakes I would have a shot. I just stayed with it off of (Turn) 4. I kept my locker locked as much as I could with the gas just keeping as much fuel to the car as I could. It worked out for us.” Adding to his Great start to the season, he also said that this was "the start of what we need to be doing as a group. I feel like we have everything all the other companies have. We still have a lot of work to do, but it feels good to have a small moral victory here.” After qualifying second, Kevin Harvick complemented the great "effort by Rodney and the team getting the car ready. This track is a challenge with its bumps and rough surface and the lower downforce makes them harder to drive but we’ve got a good car and looking forward to Sunday. Our goal was to run the same lap time all three rounds. That is going to put you in a spot to have a chance. All in all, it’s been a good start to the weekend and really looking forward to the race on Sunday.” After qualifying third, Denny Hamlin said he's "had fast cars all year long, and I knew going into that third session, if I didn’t make mistakes I would have a shot. I just stayed with it off of 4. I kept my locker locked as much as I could with the gas just keeping as much fuel to the car as I could. It worked out for us.”

=== Qualifying results ===
Pos	No.	Driver	Team	Manufacturer	R1	R2	R3
1	3	Austin Dillon	Richard Childress Racing	Chevrolet	38.413	38.209	38.200
2	4	Kevin Harvick	Stewart–Haas Racing	Chevrolet	38.238	38.226	38.231
3	11	Denny Hamlin	Joe Gibbs Racing	Toyota	38.241	38.194	38.372
4	31	Ryan Newman	Richard Childress Racing	Chevrolet	38.388	38.369	38.446
5	19	Carl Edwards	Joe Gibbs Racing	Toyota	38.505	38.360	38.457
6	18	Kyle Busch	Joe Gibbs Racing	Toyota	38.413	38.362	38.459
7	6	Trevor Bayne	Roush Fenway Racing	Ford	38.334	38.291	38.520
8	24	Chase Elliott (R)	Hendrick Motorsports	Chevrolet	38.215	38.195	38.545
9	22	Joey Logano	Team Penske	Chevrolet	38.267	38.350	38.594
10	1	Jamie McMurray	Chip Ganassi Racing	Chevrolet	38.392	38.327	38.638
11	47	A. J. Allmendinger (Note: A. J. Allmendinger started from the rear of the field after changing rear-end gears.)	JTG Daugherty Racing	Chevrolet	38.392	38.365	38.775
12	5	Kasey Kahne	Hendrick Motorsports	Chevrolet	38.301	38.371	0.000
13	27	Paul Menard	Richard Childress Racing	Chevrolet	38.451	38.401	—
14	21	Ryan Blaney (R)	Wood Brothers Racing	Ford	38.561	38.404	—
15	2	Brad Keselowski	Team Penske	Ford	38.200	38.455	—
16	34	Chris Buescher (R)	Front Row Motorsports	Ford	38.575	38.471	—
17	78	Martin Truex Jr.	Furniture Row Racing	Toyota	38.314	38.497	—
18	17	Ricky Stenhouse Jr.	Roush Fenway Racing	Ford	38.417	38.600	—
19	48	Jimmie Johnson	Hendrick Motorsports	Chevrolet	38.414	38.648	—
20	20	Matt Kenseth	Joe Gibbs Racing	Toyota	38.388	38.654	—
21	44	Brian Scott (R)	Richard Petty Motorsports	Ford	38.616	38.673	—
22	16	Greg Biffle (Note: Greg Biffle, Kurt Busch and Kyle Larson dropped to the rear of the field after switching to backup cars post-qualifying.)	Roush Fenway Racing	Ford	38.585	38.694	—
23	13	Casey Mears	Germain Racing	Chevrolet	38.456	38.757	—
24	14	Brian Vickers	Stewart–Haas Racing	Chevrolet	38.486	38.797	—
25	43	Aric Almirola	Richard Petty Motorsports	Ford	38.627	—	—
26	41	Kurt Busch	Stewart–Haas Racing	Chevrolet	38.690	—	—
27	88	Dale Earnhardt Jr.	Hendrick Motorsports	Chevrolet	38.693	—	—
28	7	Regan Smith	Tommy Baldwin Racing	Chevrolet	38.773	—	—
29	15	Clint Bowyer	HScott Motorsports	Chevrolet	38.785	—	—
30	95	Michael McDowell	Circle Sport – Leavine Family Racing	Chevrolet	38.817	—	—
31	10	Danica Patrick	Stewart–Haas Racing	Chevrolet	38.898	—	—
32	42	Kyle Larson	Chip Ganassi Racing	Chevrolet	38.921	—	—
33	83	Matt DiBenedetto	BK Racing	Toyota	39.001	—	—
34	38	Landon Cassill	Front Row Motorsports	Ford	39.091	—	—
35	23	David Ragan	BK Racing	Toyota	39.333	—	—
36	98	Cole Whitt	Premium Motorsports	Chevrolet	39.485	—	—
37	30	Josh Wise	The Motorsports Group	Chevrolet	39.571	—	—
38	46	Michael Annett	HScott Motorsports	Chevrolet	39.865	—	—
39	32	Jeffrey Earnhardt (R)	Go FAS Racing	Ford	39.908	—	—

== Race ==
=== First half ===
==== Start ====
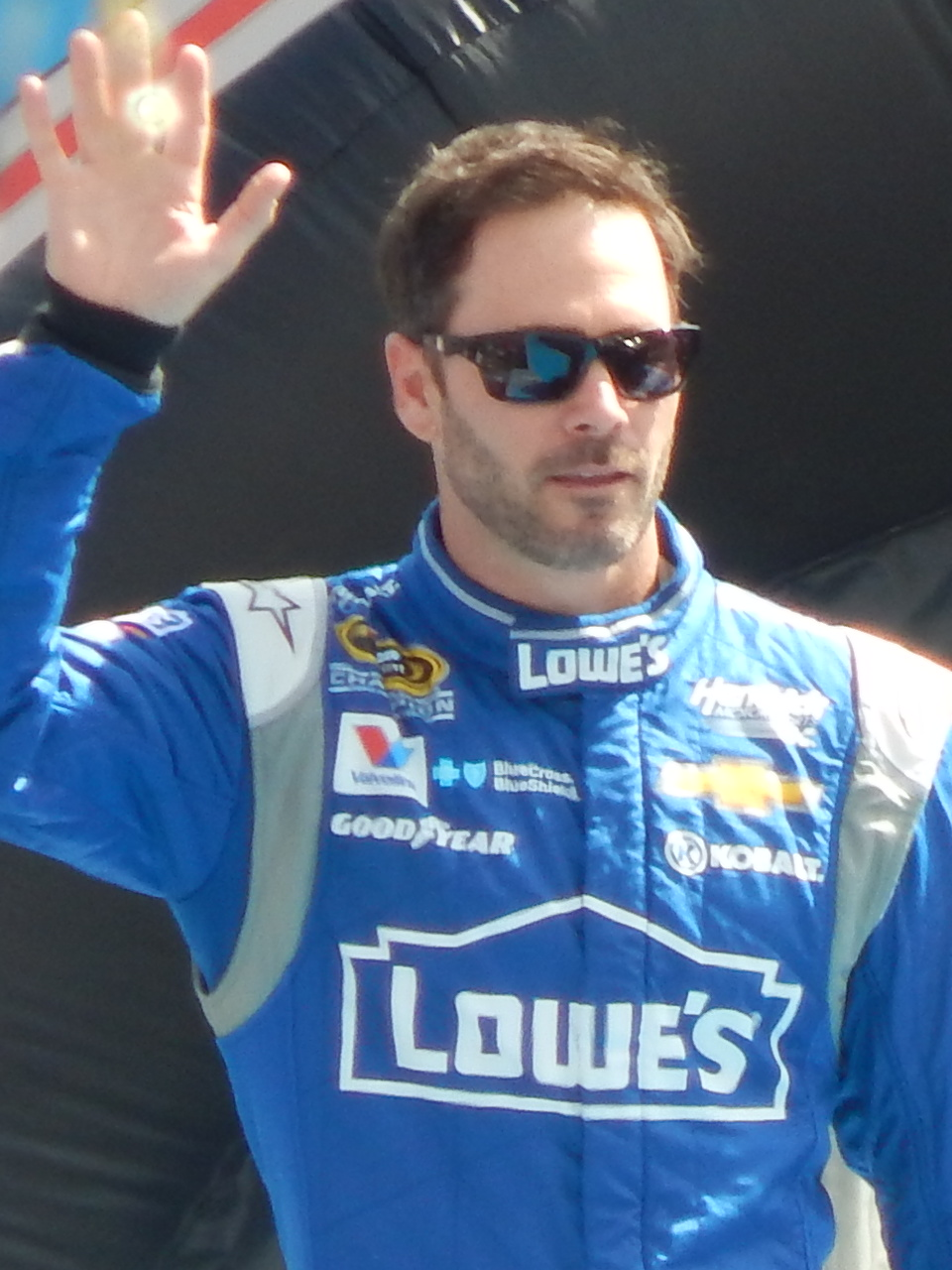
Jimmie Johnson won the race.

Under clear California skies, Austin Dillon led the field to the green flag at 3:49 p.m. He was passed going into turn 1 for the lead by Kevin Harvick. After five laps, Dillon fell back to third. Carl Edwards made a charge at Harvick, but he failed to make the pass. By lap 17, Harvick's gap grew to two seconds over Edwards. Kyle Busch was running fifth when he made an unscheduled stop for a flat right-rear tire on lap 20. He rejoined the race in 37th one-lap down. The first caution of the race flew on lap 27 for a single-car wreck in turn 2. Riding the high line, Chris Buescher suffered a right-rear tire blowout and made contact with the wall. Edwards exited pit road with the race lead. Greg Biffle, Kurt Busch and Kasey Kahne were tagged for their crews being over the wall too soon and restarted the race from the tail-end of the field.

The race restarted on lap 32. Harvick got a run on Edwards going down the backstretch to retake the lead on lap 35. Coming to the lead, Edwards took back the lead on lap 36. Going into turn 1, Harvick drove underneath Edwards to retake the lead on lap 38. The second caution of the race flew on lap 47 for a single-car wreck on the backstretch. Exiting turn 2, Kyle Larson cut down his left-rear tire, hit the outside wall, turned down the track and slammed the inside wall head-on. He said that he "was going down the back stretch and I think it was my left-rear tire got cut. It must have ripped the brake line because I went to push the pedal and it went straight to the floor board. I couldn’t slow down. It was definitely a hard hit there, probably one of the harder ones of my career. Even before that we were pretty sub-average there, we were pretty bad. Disappointed in our run today, but glad I’m alright. It was really good for about 20 laps on each run. The take-off speed was awesome and I don’t know I just couldn’t get the thing to last for a whole run. We just kind of struggled there at the end of each run, that kind of hurt us, but short-run speed that was a lot of fun. I thought we were as competitive as anybody on short-run speed. We just needed something there for the last 10 to 15 laps. We will work on it. The pit crew was awesome. They bounced back with great stops all day.” He would go on to finish 39th. Brad Keselowski was tagged for an uncontrolled tire and restarted the race from the tail-end of the field.

==== Second quarter ====
The race restarted on lap 54. Harvick made an unscheduled stop from the lead on lap 71 for a vibration. Martin Truex Jr. assumed the lead while Harvick rejoined the race in 33rd. A. J. Allmendinger also pitted from 10th for a vibration. Jimmie Johnson took the lead from Truex on lap 78. He hit pit road on lap 84 and handed the lead to teammate Chase Elliott. He pitted the next lap and handed the lead to Matt Kenseth. He pitted the next lap and the lead cycled to Harvick. Denny Hamlin and Paul Menard were tagged for speeding and were forced to serve pass-through penalty's. Matt DiBenedetto was tagged for removing equipment from his pit box and was forced to serve a pass-through penalty.

=== Second half ===
==== Halfway ====
Harvick pitted from the lead on lap 106 and handed the lead to Johnson. The third caution of the race flew on lap 108 for a single-car wreck in turn 2. Round the turn, Trevor Bayne got too close to the wall and rode it. Harvick opted not to pit under the caution and assumed the lead from Johnson. Clint Bowyer was tagged for his crew being over the wall too soon and restarted the race from the tail-end of the field.

The race restarted on lap 115. Harvick on older tires was no match for Johnson on new tires as the latter took the lead with 85 laps to go. The fourth caution of the race flew with 79 laps to go for a single-car wreck in turn 1. Going into the turn, Danica Patrick got hooked into the wall by Kahne and slammed the wall head-on. She walked towards the racing surface to show her displeasure towards Kahne. She said afterwards that she "saw him chase me down the track, and the next thing I know I was getting spun up the track. We had a restart and I was low on him, and if you go high it’ll drag you both back so I was going low. I was passing him. He was behind me on the right rear end. I don’t know what kind of day he was having – I heard he was a lap down – and I feel bad if he felt he was put in a position and got desperate there. He must’ve been having a very rough time. I was looking forward to a good finish but unfortunately it wasn’t meant to be." She, Kahne, and his crew chief, Keith Rodden, were called to the NASCAR hauler after the race. Johnson and Truex swapped the lead on pit road. The latter excited pit road with the lead. Biffle and Edwards were tagged for speeding and restarted the race from the tail-end of the field.

The race restarted with 70 laps to go. Harvick got a run on the outside line exiting turn 4 to retake the lead with 63 laps to go. Kenseth made an unscheduled stop with 52 laps to go for a flat tire. To add insult to injury, he was tagged for speeding and was forced to serve a pass-through penalty. Dale Earnhardt Jr. and Johnson pitted with 46 laps to go. Debris in turn 3 brought out the fifth caution of the race with 45 laps to go. Johnson opted to stay out when Harvick pitted and assumed the lead. Truex was tagged for speeding and restarted the race from the tail-end of the field.

==== Fourth quarter ====
The race restarted with 40 laps to go. Edwards outdrove Johnson to the line to retake the lead with 39 laps to go. Johnson drove under him in turn 1 to retake the lead with 38 laps to go. Joey Logano drove under Johnson in turn 2 to take the lead with 36 laps to go. Harvick outdrove Logano to the line to retake the lead with 34 laps to go. Driving down the backstretch, Harvick nudged Logano's rear to retain the lead with 33 laps to go. With 14 laps to go, Logano took the air off Truex's car going into turn 1 and sent him into the wall. This would lead to Truex cutting a tire down, making an unscheduled stop and finishing 32nd. Logano said after the race that he had "no excuse besides it was just racing. I tried to go underneath him and fake that and then go back to the top, and I think he was going to go to the top as well. We never touched, but I was right on him, and when you're going that fast and you take the air off the spoilers, the cars get uncontrollable. So I hate that I hurt his day, for sure." The sixth caution of the race flew with two laps to go for a single-car wreck in turn 4. Kyle Busch made contact with the wall and had a tire coming apart. Hamlin exited pit road with the race lead. Kenseth was tagged for an uncontrolled tire and restarted the race from the tail-end of the field.

===== Overtime =====
The race restarted with two laps to go. Johnson drove by Hamlin and Harvick to score the victory.

== Post-race ==
=== Driver comments ===
Speaking on the final restart, Johnson said he "got a great run off of Turn 2 and I thought ‘man I’ve got a shot at this thing’. Which I didn't expect to have, Harvick has been so fast. I cleared him and kind of got away. We saved our best for last for sure. We had our best at the last there and really strong on the short run which wasn't necessarily our strong suit earlier in the day. Chad (Knaus, crew chief) made some great adjustments there to get me tuned up for that dash at the end.”

Harvick said after the race that the final restart "was the worst it has taken off on restarts, but we weren’t very good on restarts for four or five laps unless we were all by ourselves. The No. 48 was able to hang with us and we just weren’t able to drive it in like I needed to.”

=== Penalties ===
On the Thursday after the race, Danica Patrick was fined $20,000 for walking up towards the racing surface to show her displeasure to Kahne which led to her being placed on probation as well. In addition, six teams were issued warnings for failing tech inspection multiple times.

== Race results ==
Pos	No.	Driver	Team	Manufacturer	Laps	Points
1	48	Jimmie Johnson	Hendrick Motorsports	Chevrolet	205	44
2	4	Kevin Harvick	Stewart–Haas Racing	Chevrolet	205	41
3	11	Denny Hamlin	Joe Gibbs Racing	Toyota	205	39
4	22	Joey Logano	Team Penske	Ford	205	38
5	17	Ricky Stenhouse Jr.	Roush Fenway Racing	Ford	205	36
6	24	Chase Elliott (R)	Hendrick Motorsports	Chevrolet	205	36
7	19	Carl Edwards	Joe Gibbs Racing	Toyota	205	35
8	47	A. J. Allmendinger	JTG Daugherty Racing	Chevrolet	205	33
9	2	Brad Keselowski	Team Penske	Ford	205	32
10	1	Jamie McMurray	Chip Ganassi Racing	Chevrolet	205	31
11	88	Dale Earnhardt Jr.	Hendrick Motorsports	Chevrolet	205	30
12	44	Brian Scott (R)	Richard Petty Motorsports	Ford	205	29
13	14	Brian Vickers	Stewart–Haas Racing	Chevrolet	205	28
14	31	Ryan Newman	Richard Childress Racing	Chevrolet	205	27
15	27	Paul Menard	Richard Childress Racing	Chevrolet	205	26
16	38	Landon Cassill	Front Row Motorsports	Ford	205	25
17	13	Casey Mears	Germain Racing	Chevrolet	205	24
18	15	Clint Bowyer	HScott Motorsports	Chevrolet	205	23
19	20	Matt Kenseth	Joe Gibbs Racing	Toyota	205	23
20	6	Trevor Bayne	Roush Fenway Racing	Ford	205	21
21	43	Aric Almirola	Richard Petty Motorsports	Ford	205	20
22	23	David Ragan	BK Racing	Toyota	205	19
23	7	Regan Smith	Tommy Baldwin Racing	Chevrolet	205	18
24	3	Austin Dillon	Richard Childress Racing	Chevrolet	205	17
25	18	Kyle Busch	Joe Gibbs Racing	Toyota	205	16
26	98	Cole Whitt	Premium Motorsports	Chevrolet	205	15
27	83	Matt DiBenedetto	BK Racing	Toyota	205	14
28	5	Kasey Kahne	Hendrick Motorsports	Chevrolet	205	13
29	46	Michael Annett	HScott Motorsports	Chevrolet	205	12
30	41	Kurt Busch	Stewart–Haas Racing	Chevrolet	205	11
31	95	Michael McDowell	Circle Sport – Leavine Family Racing	Chevrolet	205	10
32	78	Martin Truex Jr.	Furniture Row Racing	Toyota	204	10
33	34	Chris Buescher (R)	Front Row Motorsports	Ford	204	8
34	32	Jeffrey Earnhardt (R)	Go FAS Racing	Ford	200	7
35	21	Ryan Blaney (R)	Wood Brothers Racing	Ford	195	6
36	30	Josh Wise	The Motorsports Group	Chevrolet	195	5
37	16	Greg Biffle	Roush Fenway Racing	Ford	146	4
38	10	Danica Patrick	Stewart–Haas Racing	Chevrolet	120	3
39	42	Kyle Larson	Chip Ganassi Racing	Chevrolet	46	2
Official race results

=== Race summary ===
- Lead changes: 26
- Cautions/Laps: 6 for 33 laps
- Red flags: 0
- Time of race: 2 hours, 59 minutes and 17 seconds
- Average speed: 137.213 miles per hour (220.823 km/h)

== Media ==
=== Television ===
Fox Sports covered the race at Auto Club Speedway for the sixteenth time. Mike Joy, three-time Auto Club winner Jeff Gordon and Darrell Waltrip called the race from the commentary booth, while Jamie Little, Chris Neville and Matt Yocum handled the pit road duties for the television side.

Fox
Booth announcers	Pit reporters
Lap-by-lap: Mike Joy; Color-commentator: Jeff Gordon; Color commentator: Darrell Waltrip	Jamie Little; Chris Neville; Matt Yocum

=== Radio ===
MRN had the radio call for the race which was also simulcasted on Sirius XM NASCAR Radio. Joe Moore, Jeff Striegle and 2001 race winner Rusty Wallace called the race from the booth when the field was racing down the front stretch. Dan Hubbard called race from a billboard outside turn 2 when the field was racing through turns 1 and 2. Kurt Becker called the race from a billboard outside turn 3 when the field was racing through turns 3 and 4. Alex Hayden, Winston Kelley and Steve Post worked pit road for MRN.

MRN
Booth announcers	Turn announcers	Pit reporters
Lead announcer: Joe Moore; Announcer: Jeff Striegle; Announcer: Rusty Wallace	Turns 1 & 2: Dan Hubbard; Turns 3 & 4: Kurt Becker	Alex Hayden; Winston Kelley; Steve Post

== Standings after the race ==
Drivers' Championship standings

	Pos	Driver	Points
	1	Kevin Harvick	195
1	2	Jimmie Johnson	184 (–11)
2	3	Carl Edwards	171 (–24)
2	4	Denny Hamlin	170 (–25)
3	5	Kyle Busch	170 (–25)
1	6	Joey Logano	165 (–30)
3	7	Kurt Busch	148 (–47)
2	8	Dale Earnhardt Jr.	145 (–50)
2	9	Brad Keselowski	142 (–53)
2	10	Austin Dillon	139 (–56)
2	11	Martin Truex Jr.	127 (–68)
3	12	Jamie McMurray	125 (–70)
	13	Aric Almirola	120 (–75)
4	14	Ricky Stenhouse Jr.	119 (–76)
1	15	Matt Kenseth	113 (–82)
5	16	Chase Elliott (R)	110 (–85)
Official driver's standings

Manufacturers' Championship standings

Pos	Manufacturer	Points
1	Chevrolet	210
2	Toyota	201 (–9)
3	Ford	180 (–30)
Official manufacturers' standings

- Note: Only the first 16 positions are included for the driver standings.

== Notes ==
Previous race: 2016 Good Sam 500	Sprint Cup Series; 2016 season	Next race: 2016 STP 500
