= 2016 Kobalt 400 =

Race details
- Race 3 of 36 in the 2016 NASCAR Sprint Cup Series
- Date: March 6, 2016
- Location: Las Vegas Motor Speedway in Las Vegas
- Course: Permanent racing facility
- Course length: 1.5 miles (2.4 km)
- Distance: 267 laps, 400.5 mi (640.8 km)
- Weather: Mostly sunny skies with a temperature of 64 °F (18 °C); wind out of the southwest at 28 mph (45 km/h)
- Average speed: 138.170 mph (222.363 km/h)

Pole position
Driver	Kurt Busch	Stewart–Haas Racing
- Time: 27.505

Most laps led
Driver	Jimmie Johnson	Hendrick Motorsports
- Laps: 76

Winner
No. 2	Brad Keselowski	Team Penske

Television in the United States
- Network: Fox
- Announcers: Mike Joy, Jeff Gordon and Darrell Waltrip
- Nielsen ratings: 4.1/9 (Overnight); 4.4/10 (Final); 7.2 million viewers

Radio in the United States
- Radio: PRN
- Booth announcers: Doug Rice, Mark Garrow and Wendy Venturini
- Turn announcers: Rob Albright (1 & 2) and Pat Patterson (3 & 4)

The 2016 Kobalt 400 was a NASCAR Sprint Cup Series race held on March 6, 2016, at Las Vegas Motor Speedway in Las Vegas. Contested over 267 laps on the 1.5 mi (2.4 km) asphalt intermediate speedway, it was the third race of the 2016 NASCAR Sprint Cup Series season. Brad Keselowski won the race. Joey Logano finished second. Jimmie Johnson, Kyle Busch and Austin Dillon rounded out the top–five.

Kurt Busch won the pole for the race and led 31 laps on his way to a ninth-place finish. Johnson led a race high of 76 laps on his way to finishing third. There were 20 lead changes among 10 different drivers, as well as six caution flag periods for 36 laps.

This was the 18th career victory for Keselowski, first of the season, second at Las Vegas Motor Speedway and second at the track for Team Penske. Keselowski left Las Vegas sixth in points. Despite being the winning manufacturer, Ford left trailing Toyota by 11-points in the manufacturer standings.

The Kobalt 400 was carried by Fox Sports on the broadcast Fox network for the American television audience. The radio broadcast for the race was carried by the Performance Racing Network and Sirius XM NASCAR Radio.

== Report ==
=== Background ===
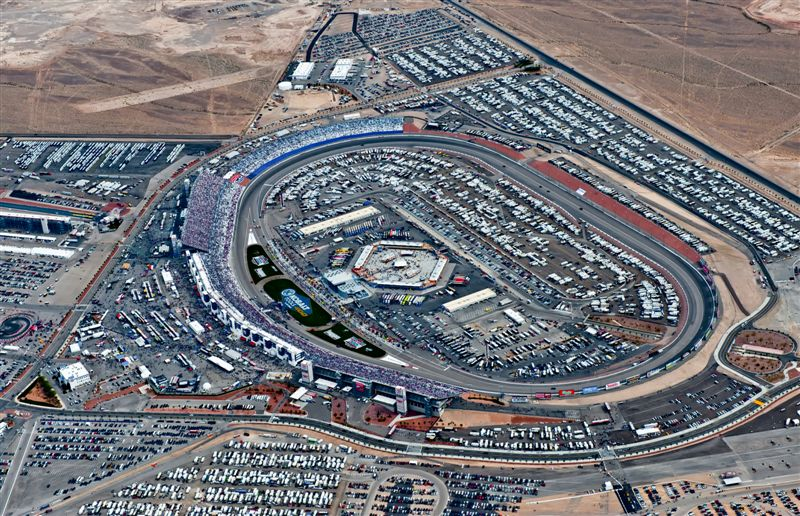
Las Vegas Motor Speedway, the track where the race will be held.

Las Vegas Motor Speedway is a 1.500 mi (2.414 km) tri-oval intermediate speedway in Las Vegas, Nevada.

=== Entry list ===
The entry list for the Kobalt 400 was released on Monday, February 29 at 3:10 p.m. Eastern time. Thirty-nine cars are entered for the race. The only driver change from the previous race is Brian Vickers returning to the seat of the No. 14 Stewart–Haas Racing Chevrolet.

No.	Driver	Team	Manufacturer
1	Jamie McMurray	Chip Ganassi Racing	Chevrolet
2	Brad Keselowski	Team Penske	Ford
3	Austin Dillon	Richard Childress Racing	Chevrolet
4	Kevin Harvick	Stewart–Haas Racing	Chevrolet
5	Kasey Kahne	Hendrick Motorsports	Chevrolet
6	Trevor Bayne	Roush Fenway Racing	Ford
7	Regan Smith	Tommy Baldwin Racing	Chevrolet
10	Danica Patrick	Stewart–Haas Racing	Chevrolet
11	Denny Hamlin	Joe Gibbs Racing	Toyota
13	Casey Mears	Germain Racing	Chevrolet
14	Brian Vickers	Stewart–Haas Racing	Chevrolet
15	Clint Bowyer	HScott Motorsports	Chevrolet
16	Greg Biffle	Roush Fenway Racing	Ford
17	Ricky Stenhouse Jr.	Roush Fenway Racing	Ford
18	Kyle Busch	Joe Gibbs Racing	Toyota
19	Carl Edwards	Joe Gibbs Racing	Toyota
20	Matt Kenseth	Joe Gibbs Racing	Toyota
21	Ryan Blaney (R)	Wood Brothers Racing	Ford
22	Joey Logano	Team Penske	Ford
23	David Ragan	BK Racing	Toyota
24	Chase Elliott (R)	Hendrick Motorsports	Chevrolet
27	Paul Menard	Richard Childress Racing	Chevrolet
30	Josh Wise	The Motorsports Group	Chevrolet
31	Ryan Newman	Richard Childress Racing	Chevrolet
32	Jeffrey Earnhardt (R)	Go FAS Racing	Ford
34	Chris Buescher (R)	Front Row Motorsports	Ford
38	Landon Cassill	Front Row Motorsports	Ford
41	Kurt Busch	Stewart–Haas Racing	Chevrolet
42	Kyle Larson	Chip Ganassi Racing	Chevrolet
43	Aric Almirola	Richard Petty Motorsports	Ford
44	Brian Scott (R)	Richard Petty Motorsports	Ford
46	Michael Annett	HScott Motorsports	Chevrolet
47	A. J. Allmendinger	JTG Daugherty Racing	Chevrolet
48	Jimmie Johnson	Hendrick Motorsports	Chevrolet
78	Martin Truex Jr.	Furniture Row Racing	Toyota
83	Matt DiBenedetto	BK Racing	Toyota
88	Dale Earnhardt Jr.	Hendrick Motorsports	Chevrolet
95	Michael McDowell	Circle Sport – Leavine Family Racing	Chevrolet
98	Cole Whitt	Premium Motorsports	Chevrolet
Official entry list

== Test sessions ==
=== Session 1 ===
Jimmie Johnson was the fastest in the first test session with a time of 27.982 and a speed of 192.981 mph (310.573 km/h).

Pos	No.	Driver	Team	Manufacturer	Time	Speed
1	48	Jimmie Johnson	Hendrick Motorsports	Chevrolet	27.982	192.981
2	11	Denny Hamlin	Joe Gibbs Racing	Toyota	28.002	192.843
3	20	Matt Kenseth	Joe Gibbs Racing	Toyota	28.105	192.137
Test session 1 results

=== Session 2 ===
Aric Almirola was the fastest in the second test session with a time of 27.988 and a speed of 192.940 mph (310.507 km/h). Denny Hamlin slammed the wall during the session and would use a backup car for the race. Because the change took place prior to qualifying, he won't start from the rear of the field. He said that the car "just snapped loose first lap after the changes.”

Pos	No.	Driver	Team	Manufacturer	Time	Speed
1	43	Aric Almirola	Richard Petty Motorsports	Ford	27.988	192.940
2	3	Austin Dillon	Richard Childress Racing	Chevrolet	28.029	192.658
3	21	Ryan Blaney (R)	Wood Brothers Racing	Ford	28.175	191.659
Test session 2 results

== Practice ==
=== First practice ===
Brad Keselowski was the fastest in the first practice session with a time of 27.646 and a speed of 195.327 mph (314.348 km/h).

Pos	No.	Driver	Team	Manufacturer	Time	Speed
1	2	Brad Keselowski	Team Penske	Ford	27.646	195.327
2	22	Joey Logano	Team Penske	Ford	27.655	195.263
3	41	Kurt Busch	Stewart–Haas Racing	Chevrolet	27.659	195.235
Official first practice results

=== Second practice ===
Carl Edwards was the fastest in the second practice session with a time of 28.189 and a speed of 191.564 mph (308.292 km/h).

Pos	No.	Driver	Team	Manufacturer	Time	Speed
1	19	Carl Edwards	Joe Gibbs Racing	Toyota	28.189	191.564
2	3	Austin Dillon	Richard Childress Racing	Chevrolet	28.288	190.894
3	13	Casey Mears	Germain Racing	Chevrolet	28.317	190.698
Official second practice results

=== Final practice ===
Matt Kenseth was the fastest in the final practice session with a time of 28.502 and a speed of 189.460 mph (304.906 km/h).

Pos	No.	Driver	Team	Manufacturer	Time	Speed
1	20	Matt Kenseth	Joe Gibbs Racing	Toyota	28.502	189.460
2	19	Carl Edwards	Joe Gibbs Racing	Toyota	28.594	188.851
3	41	Kurt Busch	Stewart–Haas Racing	Chevrolet	28.616	188.706
Official final practice results

== Qualifying ==
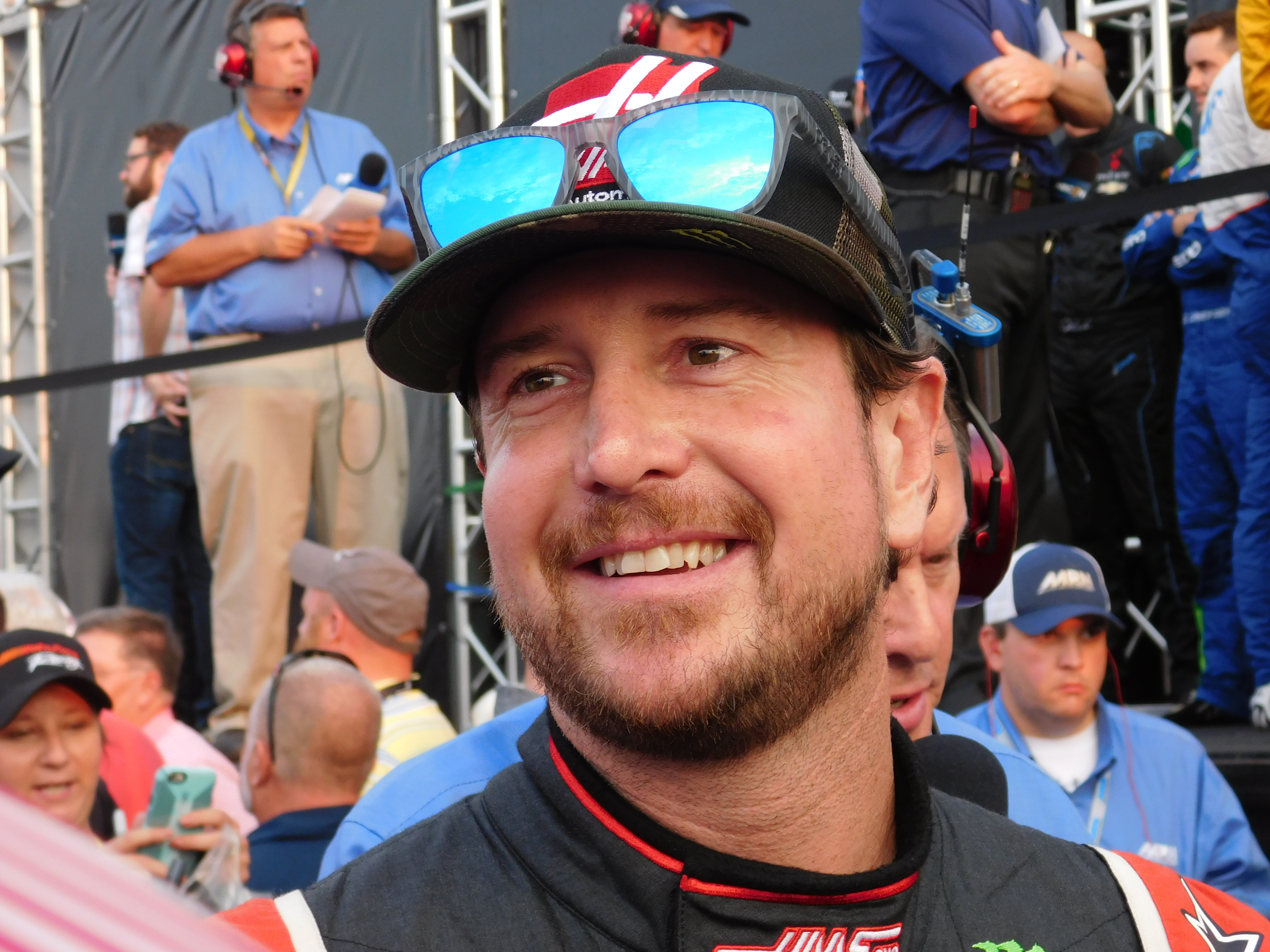
Kurt Busch scored the pole for the race.

Kurt Busch scored the pole for the race with a time of 27.505 and a speed of 196.328 mph (315.959 km/h). He said the car "was insanely fast. It’s amazing all the detail that goes into qualifying with finding that perfect lap three times out there. My second outing we were way tight and I didn’t know where it came from. “(Tony) Gibson, (crew chief) and crew went to town. They just adjusted on it. We gambled and we made that last session, which was great. That was icing on the cake to be able to go out into the third round. I was first or 12th it didn’t matter.” Joey Logano said that second for him was "so close. Second always stings the most. I felt like that last run I just – I told Todd that our car was close I just had to want it more. I pushed as hard as I could and got a little tight in one and two and that was enough to give up that speed we needed to get the pole tonight. I am so proud of what this Pennzoil team has done to pick up over last week. Dang it. It is so close. It was a lot of fun out there tonight and we are looking forward to Sunday.” Kyle Busch, who described his car as being "out of control" after qualifying 23rd, said that his "front tires were chattering, and there wasn’t much we were going to do to fix that out there." Carl Edwards switched to a backup car after making contact with the wall in the session. Because this took place after qualifying, he'll start from the rear of the field. He said that going to his backup was "frustrating because the car was really fast but they say the back-up is just as fast. I guarantee that car will be as good as this one."

=== Qualifying results ===
Pos	No.	Driver	Team	Manufacturer	R1	R2	R3
1	41	Kurt Busch	Stewart–Haas Racing	Chevrolet	27.498	27.649	27.505
2	22	Joey Logano	Team Penske	Ford	27.640	27.623	27.575
3	20	Matt Kenseth	Joe Gibbs Racing	Toyota	27.737	27.670	27.582
4	2	Brad Keselowski	Team Penske	Ford	27.735	27.613	27.598
5	3	Austin Dillon	Richard Childress Racing	Chevrolet	27.809	27.733	27.604
6	4	Kevin Harvick	Stewart–Haas Racing	Chevrolet	27.732	27.733	27.628
7	43	Aric Almirola	Richard Petty Motorsports	Ford	27.777	27.683	27.651
8	5	Kasey Kahne	Hendrick Motorsports	Chevrolet	27.781	27.724	27.652
9	11	Denny Hamlin	Joe Gibbs Racing	Toyota	27.749	27.711	27.681
10	78	Martin Truex Jr.	Furniture Row Racing	Toyota	27.881	27.663	27.696
11	48	Jimmie Johnson	Hendrick Motorsports	Chevrolet	27.661	27.725	27.837
12	47	A. J. Allmendinger	JTG Daugherty Racing	Chevrolet	27.870	27.682	27.961
13	24	Chase Elliott (R)	Hendrick Motorsports	Chevrolet	27.870	27.740	—
14	21	Ryan Blaney (R)	Wood Brothers Racing	Ford	27.806	27.741	—
15	27	Paul Menard	Richard Childress Racing	Chevrolet	27.906	27.784	—
16	17	Ricky Stenhouse Jr.	Roush Fenway Racing	Ford	27.820	27.792	—
17	42	Kyle Larson	Chip Ganassi Racing	Chevrolet	27.850	27.851	—
18	10	Danica Patrick	Stewart–Haas Racing	Chevrolet	27.871	27.889	—
19	14	Brian Vickers	Stewart–Haas Racing	Chevrolet	27.732	27.893	—
20	88	Dale Earnhardt Jr.	Hendrick Motorsports	Chevrolet	27.912	27.915	—
21	31	Ryan Newman	Richard Childress Racing	Chevrolet	27.911	27.931	—
22	13	Casey Mears	Germain Racing	Chevrolet	27.820	27.989	—
23	18	Kyle Busch	Joe Gibbs Racing	Toyota	27.946	28.009	—
24	19	Carl Edwards (Note: Carl Edwards started from the rear of the field after switching to a backup car post-qualifying.)	Joe Gibbs Racing	Toyota	27.678	0.000	—
25	34	Chris Buescher (R)	Front Row Motorsports	Ford	27.972	—	—
26	16	Greg Biffle	Roush Fenway Racing	Ford	27.989	—	—
27	38	Landon Cassill	Front Row Motorsports	Ford	28.015	—	—
28	6	Trevor Bayne	Roush Fenway Racing	Ford	28.019	—	—
29	1	Jamie McMurray (Note: Jamie McMurray started from the rear of the field after switching to a backup car post-qualifying.)	Chip Ganassi Racing	Chevrolet	28.075	—	—
30	95	Michael McDowell	Circle Sport – Leavine Family Racing	Chevrolet	28.122	—	—
31	23	David Ragan	BK Racing	Toyota	28.144	—	—
32	44	Brian Scott (R)	Richard Petty Motorsports	Ford	28.251	—	—
33	7	Regan Smith	Tommy Baldwin Racing	Chevrolet	28.291	—	—
34	83	Matt DiBenedetto	BK Racing	Toyota	28.398	—	—
35	15	Clint Bowyer	HScott Motorsports	Chevrolet	28.566	—	—
36	98	Cole Whitt	Premium Motorsports	Chevrolet	28.659	—	—
37	46	Michael Annett	HScott Motorsports	Chevrolet	28.661	—	—
38	32	Jeffrey Earnhardt (R)	Go FAS Racing	Ford	28.747	—	—
39	30	Josh Wise	The Motorsports Group	Chevrolet	29.062	—	—
Official qualifying results

== Race ==
=== First half ===
==== Start ====
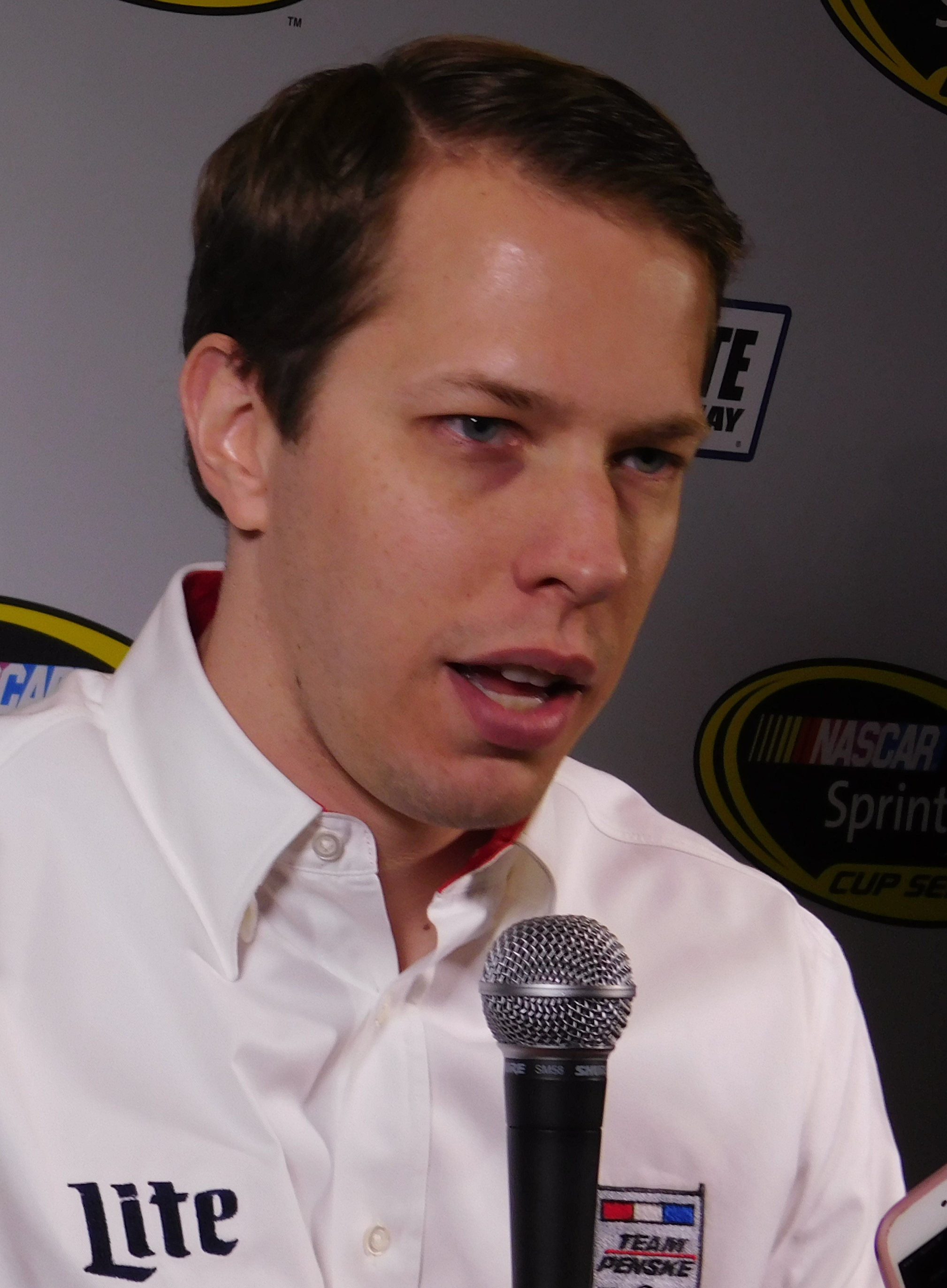
Brad Keselowski won the race.

Under clear Nevada skies, Kurt Busch led the field to the green flag at 4:11 p.m. After 10 laps, he pulled to a 1.5 second lead over Joey Logano. By lap 25, Logano cut the deficit in half. A number of cars began reporting pieces of trash lying all over the track due to the 30 mph (48 km/h) gusts of wind. The first caution of the race flew on lap 31. It was a scheduled competition caution due to rain. Denny Hamlin exited pit road with the lead. Busch was tagged for being too fast on pit road and restarted the race from the tail-end of the field. Clint Bowyer was tagged for an uncontrolled tire and restarted the race from the tail-end of the field.

The race restarted on lap 36. Logano drove under Hamlin going into turn 3 to take the lead on lap 45. After 10 laps, he pulled to a two-second lead over Matt Kenseth. By lap 70, teammate Brad Keselowski chipped away half his lead. Kenseth was running fourth when he made an unscheduled stop on lap 74 for a loose wheel. He rejoined the race in 35th one lap down. A number of cars began pitting on lap 82. Logano hit pit road on lap 83 and handed the lead to Kevin Harvick. He pitted the next lap and Austin Dillon took the lead. He pitted the next lap and the lead cycled to Keselowski. A. J. Allmendinger was tagged for speeding on pit road and was forced to serve a pass-through penalty. Chris Buescher was tagged for an uncontrolled tire and was forced to serve a pass-through penalty.

==== Second quarter ====
Debris on the backstretch brought out the second caution of the race on lap 99. Keselowski and Logano swapped the lead on pit road with the former pitting before the start/finish line, but Jimmie Johnson exited pit road with the lead after taking just right-side tires.

The race restarted on lap 105. Logano took the lead from Johnson on lap 133, but Johnson passed him back the next lap. A number of cars began pitting on lap 141. These were the cars that took the wave-around under the second caution. It didn't stop Johnson from pitting on lap 149 and handing the lead over to Logano. He pitted on lap 151 and handed the lead to teammate Keselowski. He pitted on lap 154 and the lead cycled back to Johnson. Greg Biffle, Dillon, Kyle Larson and Ricky Stenhouse Jr. were all tagged for speeding on pit road and were forced to serve pass-through penalties.

=== Second half ===
==== Halfway ====
Dealing with lapped traffic going into turn 1, Logano passed Johnson to take the lead on lap 178. Debris in turn 1 brought out the third caution of the race on lap 179. Johnson and Logano swapped the lead on pit road with the latter exiting with the lead. Keselowski was tagged for speeding on pit road and restarted the race from the tail-end of the field. After the race, Paul Wolfe – Keselowski's crew chief – said that overcoming the penalty "talks about the whole team and how strong we are, how we continue to push. We had to overcome adversity today obviously. I think Brad and this team showed in the past there's no one I think that's any better at that. Getting that speeding penalty early on, you know, obviously wasn't ideal. No one gave up. Brad obviously continued to push hard and show the strength of the car."

The race restarted with 82 laps to go. The fourth caution of the race flew with 69 laps to go for a single-car spin in turn 2. Rounding the turn, Allmendinger clipped the left-rear corner of Larson's car and sent him spinning. The right-rear corner tagged the wall. Kenseth exited pit road with the race lead. The restart was held a few laps for a dust storm building up southeast of the track.

==== Fourth quarter ====
Despite a dust storm settling over the track, the race restarted with 64 laps to go. Johnson got a run on Kenseth exiting turn 4 and took the lead with 57 laps to go. The fifth caution of the race flew with 53 laps to go for a two-car wreck in turn 4. It appeared that Larson and Regan Smith got loose and slammed the wall. Logano opted not to pit when Johnson did and assumed the race lead.

The race restarted with 44 laps to go. Kyle Busch drove under Logano in turn 3 to take the lead with 43 to go. The sixth caution of the race flew for a multi-car wreck in turn 1. Going into the turn, Kenseth got loose, slid up the track and slammed the wall. Chase Elliott slammed into his rear. Checking up to avoid Kenseth, Kurt Busch got loose, clipped Carl Edwards and sent both of them spinning. Kenseth said he didn't "know what happened. I just turned off in there and spun off before I honestly knew what was happening. I don’t know why it spun out. I tried to save it the best I could and just got hit hard from behind and ended up wrecking it.” Elliott said what happened was "disappointing. What a fast race car. Just a terrible job on my behalf. It's pitiful. Run three races and finished one. Bad job on my end. I know better to miss a wreck like that.”

The race restarted with 35 laps to go. Busch shot out ahead of Logano and began to pull away. With 15 laps to go, that gap closed to less than a second. With 12 to go, he said his right-front tire was "falling apart". Keselowski closed in and passed Busch for the lead with five laps to go and drove on to score the victory.

== Post-race ==
=== Driver comments ===
Keselowski described his day as "really, really great. It seemed like there were plenty of challenges, whether it was pit road or the weather or cautions. They threw everything they had at us today but this Miller Lite Ford team was too strong and we were able to fight them off and get to victory lane.”

After finishing runner-up, Logano said he's "finished second so many times this year already, and this whole weekend we finished second. Second in every qualifying round, during qualifying, second in practice on Friday, second in the race. Just so close. I want to break through and get a trophy eventually. Still, nothing to hold our heads down about. It's not easy to finish second. I want to break through and get a trophy."

Kyle Busch said he "had a vibration when we put the rights on, and it just kept getting worse and worse. There at the end, I didn't know if a tire was coming off or what. And there at the end, I was trying to give it everything I had, but it would just not turn. It just go so tight, it was the tightest we were all day.” He also added that his car was "really, really bad this whole weekend, horrible. So, not a bad finish today considering. Not a win. But we have started top-fiving it and when we do that, the wins should come."

Following his fifth-place finish, Dillon said of his speeding penalty that he "did all I could there to get ourselves back in a position to get back on the lead lap. The caution fell perfect for us. It took a gutsy call there (by Labbe) to take the wave-around to get back on the lead lap, to see if the caution would come out. It did right in our window, so things fell our way there for sure. But what a fast racecar. We were running some lap times faster than the leader in the middle of the race when we were laps down. That's something we're really proud of."

After finishing sixth, Ryan Blaney said that it "was really satisfying. It was a good day for us. We needed a good finish after last week and it is nice to go out here and we all had fast cars. ... We were able to drive up through the field early and made it better throughout the day. We had some spectacular late runs but we'd give up a little too much early and we couldn't ever get back what we lost. It's a great day.”

== Race results ==
Pos	No.	Driver	Team	Manufacturer	Laps	Points
1	2	Brad Keselowski	Team Penske	Ford	267	44
2	22	Joey Logano	Team Penske	Ford	267	40
3	48	Jimmie Johnson	Hendrick Motorsports	Chevrolet	267	40
4	18	Kyle Busch	Joe Gibbs Racing	Toyota	267	38
5	3	Austin Dillon	Richard Childress Racing	Chevrolet	267	37
6	21	Ryan Blaney (R)	Wood Brothers Racing	Ford	267	35
7	4	Kevin Harvick	Stewart–Haas Racing	Chevrolet	267	35
8	88	Dale Earnhardt Jr.	Hendrick Motorsports	Chevrolet	267	33
9	41	Kurt Busch	Stewart–Haas Racing	Chevrolet	267	33
10	5	Kasey Kahne	Hendrick Motorsports	Chevrolet	267	31
11	78	Martin Truex Jr.	Furniture Row Racing	Toyota	267	30
12	17	Ricky Stenhouse Jr.	Roush Fenway Racing	Ford	267	29
13	31	Ryan Newman	Richard Childress Racing	Chevrolet	267	28
14	47	A. J. Allmendinger	JTG Daugherty Racing	Chevrolet	267	27
15	27	Paul Menard	Richard Childress Racing	Chevrolet	267	26
16	1	Jamie McMurray	Chip Ganassi Racing	Chevrolet	267	25
17	6	Trevor Bayne	Roush Fenway Racing	Ford	267	25
18	19	Carl Edwards	Joe Gibbs Racing	Toyota	267	23
19	11	Denny Hamlin	Joe Gibbs Racing	Toyota	267	23
20	16	Greg Biffle	Roush Fenway Racing	Ford	267	21
21	10	Danica Patrick	Stewart–Haas Racing	Chevrolet	267	20
22	15	Clint Bowyer	HScott Motorsports	Chevrolet	267	19
23	13	Casey Mears	Germain Racing	Chevrolet	267	18
24	43	Aric Almirola	Richard Petty Motorsports	Ford	266	17
25	7	Regan Smith	Tommy Baldwin Racing	Chevrolet	266	17
26	34	Chris Buescher (R)	Front Row Motorsports	Ford	266	15
27	44	Brian Scott (R)	Richard Petty Motorsports	Ford	266	14
28	38	Landon Cassill	Front Row Motorsports	Ford	266	13
29	95	Michael McDowell	Circle Sport - Leavine Family Racing	Chevrolet	266	12
30	46	Michael Annett	HScott Motorsports	Chevrolet	265	11
31	83	Matt DiBenedetto	BK Racing	Toyota	263	10
32	23	David Ragan	BK Racing	Toyota	262	9
33	32	Jeffrey Earnhardt (R)	Go FAS Racing	Ford	262	8
34	42	Kyle Larson	Chip Ganassi Racing	Chevrolet	262	7
35	30	Josh Wise	The Motorsports Group	Chevrolet	259	6
36	14	Brian Vickers	Stewart–Haas Racing	Chevrolet	257	5
37	20	Matt Kenseth	Joe Gibbs Racing	Toyota	224	5
38	24	Chase Elliott (R)	Hendrick Motorsports	Chevrolet	224	3
39	98	Cole Whitt	Premium Motorsports	Chevrolet	115	2
Official race results

=== Race summary ===
- Lead changes: 20
- Cautions/Laps: 6 for 36
- Red flags: 0
- Time of race: 2 hours, 53 minutes and 55 seconds
- Average speed: 138.17 miles per hour (222.36 km/h)

== Media ==
=== Television ===
Fox Sports will be covering their 16th race at the Las Vegas Motor Speedway. Mike Joy, 2001 race winner Jeff Gordon and Darrell Waltrip will have the call in the booth for the race. Jamie Little, Vince Welch and Matt Yocum will handle the pit road duties for the television side.

Fox
Booth announcers	Pit reporters
Lap-by-lap: Mike Joy; Color-commentator: Jeff Gordon; Color commentator: Darrell Waltrip	Jamie Little; Vince Welch; Matt Yocum

=== Radio ===
PRN will have the radio call for the race which will also be simulcast on Sirius XM NASCAR Radio. Doug Rice, Mark Garrow and Wendy Venturini will call the race in the booth when the field is racing through the tri-oval. Rob Albright will call the race from a billboard in turn 2 when the field is racing through turns 1 and 2. Pat Patterson will call the race from a billboard outside of turn 3 when the field is racing through turns 3 and 4. Brad Gillie, Brett McMillan, Jim Noble and Steve Richards will work pit road for the radio side.

PRN
Booth announcers	Turn announcers	Pit reporters
Lead announcer: Doug Rice; Announcer: Mark Garrow; Announcer: Wendy Venturini	Turns 1 & 2: Rob Albright; Turns 3 & 4: Pat Patterson	Brad Gillie; Brett McMillan; Jim Noble; Steve Richards

== Standings after the race ==
Drivers' Championship standings

	Pos	Driver	Points
	1	Kyle Busch	116
3	2	Jimmie Johnson	110 (–6)
1	3	Kevin Harvick	109 (–7)
3	4	Joey Logano	104 (–12)
1	5	Kurt Busch	102 (–14)
4	6	Brad Keselowski	98 (–18)
4	7	Carl Edwards	96 (–20)
4	8	Denny Hamlin	93 (–23)
1	9	Martin Truex Jr.	90 (–26)
1	10	Austin Dillon	90 (–26)
2	11	Ricky Stenhouse Jr.	79 (–37)
4	12	Dale Earnhardt Jr.	78 (–38)
2	13	Kasey Kahne	77 (–39)
7	14	Ryan Blaney (R)	73 (–43)
6	15	Aric Almirola	72 (–44)
1	16	Jamie McMurray	69 (–47)
Official driver's standings

Manufacturers' Championship standings

Pos	Manufacturer	Points
1	Toyota	122
2	Chevrolet	121 (–1)
3	Ford	111 (–11)
Official manufacturers' standings

- Note: Only the first 16 positions are included for the driver standings.

== Notes ==
Previous race: 2016 Folds of Honor QuikTrip 500	Sprint Cup Series; 2016 season	Next race: 2016 Good Sam 500
