= 1998 Dura Lube/Kmart 500 =

31st race of the 1998 NASCAR Winston Cup Series

Race details
- Race 31 of 33 in the 1998 NASCAR Winston Cup Series
- The 1998 Dura Lube/Kmart 500 program cover.
- Date: October 25, 1998
- Location: Avondale, Arizona, Phoenix International Raceway
- Course: Permanent racing facility
- Course length: 1 miles (1.6 km)
- Distance: 257 laps, 257 mi (413.601 km)
- Scheduled distance: 312 laps, 312 mi (502.115 km)
- Average speed: 108.211 miles per hour (174.149 km/h)

Pole position
Driver	Ken Schrader	Andy Petree Racing
- Time: 27.432

Most laps led
Driver	Rusty Wallace	Penske-Kranefuss Racing
- Laps: 196

Winner
No. 2	Rusty Wallace	Penske-Kranefuss Racing

Television in the United States
- Network: TNN
- Announcers: Eli Gold, Buddy Baker, Dick Berggren

Radio in the United States
- Radio: Motor Racing Network

The 1998 Dura Lube/Kmart 500 was the 31st stock car race of the 1998 NASCAR Winston Cup Series season and the 11th iteration of the event. The race was held on Sunday, October 25, 1998, in Avondale, Arizona at Phoenix International Raceway, a 1-mile (1.6 km) permanent low-banked tri-oval race track. The race was shortened from its scheduled 312 laps to 257 laps due to inclement weather. At race's end, Penske-Kranefuss Racing driver Rusty Wallace would dominate the race when the race was stopped to take his 48th career NASCAR Winston Cup Series victory and his only victory of the season. To fill out the podium, Roush Racing driver Mark Martin and Richard Childress Racing driver Dale Earnhardt would finish second and third, respectively.

== Background ==
The layout of Phoenix International Raceway, the venue where the race was held.

Phoenix International Raceway is a one-mile, low-banked tri-oval race track located in Avondale, Arizona. It is named after the nearby metropolitan area of Phoenix. The motorsport track opened in 1964 and is currently owned and operated by International Speedway Corporation.

The raceway was originally constructed with a 2.5 mi (4.0 km) road course that ran both inside and outside of the main tri-oval. In 1991 the track was reconfigured with the current 1.51 mi (2.43 km) interior layout. PIR has an estimated grandstand seating capacity of around 67,000. Lights were installed around the track in 2004 following the addition of a second annual NASCAR race weekend.

=== Entry list ===
- (R) denotes rookie driver.

#	Driver	Team	Make
1	Steve Park (R)	Dale Earnhardt, Inc.	Chevrolet
2	Rusty Wallace	Penske-Kranefuss Racing	Ford
3	Dale Earnhardt	Richard Childress Racing	Chevrolet
4	Bobby Hamilton	Morgan–McClure Motorsports	Chevrolet
5	Terry Labonte	Hendrick Motorsports	Chevrolet
6	Mark Martin	Roush Racing	Ford
7	Geoff Bodine	Mattei Motorsports	Ford
9	Jerry Nadeau (R)	Melling Racing	Ford
10	Ricky Rudd	Rudd Performance Motorsports	Ford
11	Brett Bodine	Brett Bodine Racing	Ford
12	Jeremy Mayfield	Penske-Kranefuss Racing	Ford
13	Ted Musgrave	Elliott-Marino Racing	Ford
16	Kevin Lepage (R)	Roush Racing	Ford
18	Bobby Labonte	Joe Gibbs Racing	Pontiac
21	Michael Waltrip	Wood Brothers Racing	Ford
22	Ward Burton	Bill Davis Racing	Pontiac
23	Jimmy Spencer	Travis Carter Enterprises	Ford
24	Jeff Gordon	Hendrick Motorsports	Chevrolet
26	Johnny Benson Jr.	Roush Racing	Ford
28	Kenny Irwin Jr. (R)	Robert Yates Racing	Ford
30	Derrike Cope	Bahari Racing	Pontiac
31	Mike Skinner	Richard Childress Racing	Chevrolet
33	Ken Schrader	Andy Petree Racing	Chevrolet
35	Darrell Waltrip	Tyler Jet Motorsports	Pontiac
36	Ernie Irvan	MB2 Motorsports	Pontiac
40	Sterling Marlin	Team SABCO	Chevrolet
41	David Green	Larry Hedrick Motorsports	Chevrolet
42	Joe Nemechek	Team SABCO	Chevrolet
43	John Andretti	Petty Enterprises	Pontiac
44	Kyle Petty	Petty Enterprises	Pontiac
45	Jeff Ward	BMR Motorsports	Chevrolet
46	Jeff Green	Team SABCO	Chevrolet
50	Wally Dallenbach Jr.	Hendrick Motorsports	Chevrolet
71	Dave Marcis	Marcis Auto Racing	Chevrolet
75	Rick Mast	Butch Mock Motorsports	Ford
77	Ted Musgrave	Jasper Motorsports	Ford
78	Gary Bradberry	Triad Motorsports	Ford
81	Kenny Wallace	FILMAR Racing	Ford
88	Dale Jarrett	Robert Yates Racing	Ford
90	Dick Trickle	Donlavey Racing	Ford
91	Todd Bodine	LJ Racing	Chevrolet
94	Bill Elliott	Elliott-Marino Racing	Ford
96	Mike Bliss	American Equipment Racing	Chevrolet
97	Chad Little	Roush Racing	Ford
98	Rich Bickle	Cale Yarborough Motorsports	Ford
99	Jeff Burton	Roush Racing	Ford

== Practice ==
=== First practice ===
The first practice session was held on Friday, October 23, at 1:30 PM EST. The session would last for one hour and 25 minutes. Ken Schrader, driving for Andy Petree Racing, would set the fastest time in the session, with a lap of 27.757 and an average speed of 129.697 miles per hour (208.727 km/h).

Pos.	#	Driver	Team	Make	Time	Speed
1	33	Ken Schrader	Andy Petree Racing	Chevrolet	27.757	129.697
2	75	Rick Mast	Butch Mock Motorsports	Ford	27.760	129.683
3	6	Mark Martin	Roush Racing	Ford	27.863	129.204
Full first practice results

=== Second practice ===
The second practice session was held on Friday, October 23, at 3:35 PM EST. The session would last for 45 minutes. Ken Schrader, driving for Andy Petree Racing, would set the fastest time in the session, with a lap of 27.604 and an average speed of 130.416 miles per hour (209.884 km/h).

Pos.	#	Driver	Team	Make	Time	Speed
1	33	Ken Schrader	Andy Petree Racing	Chevrolet	27.604	130.416
2	24	Jeff Gordon	Hendrick Motorsports	Chevrolet	27.785	129.566
3	98	Rich Bickle	Cale Yarborough Motorsports	Ford	27.814	129.431
Full second practice results

=== Final practice ===
The final practice session was held on Saturday, October 24. The session would last for one hour. Kyle Petty, driving for Petty Enterprises, would set the fastest time in the session, with a lap of 28.437 and an average speed of 126.596 miles per hour (203.737 km/h).

Pos.	#	Driver	Team	Make	Time	Speed
1	44	Kyle Petty	Petty Enterprises	Pontiac	28.437	126.596
2	4	Bobby Hamilton	Morgan–McClure Motorsports	Chevrolet	28.441	126.578
3	22	Ward Burton	Bill Davis Racing	Pontiac	28.447	126.551
Full Happy Hour practice results

== Qualifying ==
Qualifying was split into two rounds. The first round was held on Friday, October 23, at 5:15 PM EST. Each driver would have one lap to set a time. During the first round, the top 25 drivers in the round would be guaranteed a starting spot in the race. If a driver was not able to guarantee a spot in the first round, they had the option to scrub their time from the first round and try and run a faster lap time in a second round qualifying run, held on Saturday, October 24, at 2:00 PM EST. As with the first round, each driver would have one lap to set a time. On January 24, 1998, NASCAR would announce that the amount of provisionals given would be increased from last season. Positions 26-36 would be decided on time, while positions 37-43 would be based on provisionals. Six spots are awarded by the use of provisionals based on owner's points. The seventh is awarded to a past champion who has not otherwise qualified for the race. If no past champion needs the provisional, the next team in the owner points will be awarded a provisional.

Ken Schrader, driving for Andy Petree Racing, would win the pole, setting a time of 27.432 and an average speed of 131.234 miles per hour (211.201 km/h).

Three drivers would fail to qualify: Dave Marcis, Michael Waltrip, and Jeff Ward.

=== Full qualifying results ===
Pos.	#	Driver	Team	Make	Time	Speed
1	33	Ken Schrader	Andy Petree Racing	Chevrolet	27.432	131.234
2	28	Kenny Irwin Jr. (R)	Robert Yates Racing	Ford	27.438	131.205
3	81	Kenny Wallace	FILMAR Racing	Ford	27.564	130.605
4	94	Bill Elliott	Elliott-Marino Racing	Ford	27.613	130.373
5	98	Rich Bickle	Cale Yarborough Motorsports	Ford	27.633	130.279
6	2	Rusty Wallace	Penske-Kranefuss Racing	Ford	27.654	130.180
7	75	Rick Mast	Butch Mock Motorsports	Ford	27.670	130.105
8	31	Mike Skinner	Richard Childress Racing	Chevrolet	27.671	130.100
9	41	David Green	Larry Hedrick Motorsports	Chevrolet	27.687	130.025
10	13	Ted Musgrave	Elliott-Marino Racing	Ford	27.707	129.931
11	6	Mark Martin	Roush Racing	Ford	27.717	129.884
12	24	Jeff Gordon	Hendrick Motorsports	Chevrolet	27.725	129.847
13	11	Brett Bodine	Brett Bodine Racing	Ford	27.732	129.814
14	22	Ward Burton	Bill Davis Racing	Pontiac	27.737	129.791
15	26	Johnny Benson Jr.	Roush Racing	Ford	27.739	129.781
16	40	Sterling Marlin	Team SABCO	Chevrolet	27.743	129.762
17	91	Todd Bodine	LJ Racing	Chevrolet	27.744	129.758
18	23	Jimmy Spencer	Travis Carter Enterprises	Ford	27.759	129.688
19	43	John Andretti	Petty Enterprises	Pontiac	27.797	129.510
20	88	Dale Jarrett	Robert Yates Racing	Ford	27.808	129.459
21	10	Ricky Rudd	Rudd Performance Motorsports	Ford	27.812	129.441
22	12	Jeremy Mayfield	Penske-Kranefuss Racing	Ford	27.821	129.399
23	50	Wally Dallenbach Jr.	Hendrick Motorsports	Chevrolet	27.836	129.329
24	77	Robert Pressley	Jasper Motorsports	Ford	27.871	129.167
25	16	Kevin Lepage (R)	Roush Racing	Ford	27.881	129.120
26	7	Geoff Bodine	Mattei Motorsports	Ford	27.890	129.079
27	96	Mike Bliss	American Equipment Racing	Chevrolet	27.894	129.060
28	78	Gary Bradberry	Triad Motorsports	Ford	27.894	129.060
29	5	Terry Labonte	Hendrick Motorsports	Chevrolet	27.895	129.055
30	90	Dick Trickle	Donlavey Racing	Ford	27.907	129.000
31	44	Kyle Petty	Petty Enterprises	Pontiac	27.913	128.972
32	42	Joe Nemechek	Team SABCO	Chevrolet	27.916	128.958
33	46	Jeff Green	Team SABCO	Chevrolet	27.935	128.871
34	9	Jerry Nadeau (R)	Melling Racing	Ford	27.946	128.820
35	1	Steve Park (R)	Dale Earnhardt, Inc.	Chevrolet	27.947	128.815
36	30	Derrike Cope	Bahari Racing	Pontiac	27.966	128.728
Provisionals
37	18	Bobby Labonte	Joe Gibbs Racing	Pontiac	-*	-*
38	99	Jeff Burton	Roush Racing	Ford	-*	-*
39	3	Dale Earnhardt	Richard Childress Racing	Chevrolet	-*	-*
40	4	Bobby Hamilton	Morgan–McClure Motorsports	Chevrolet	-*	-*
41	36	Ricky Craven	MB2 Motorsports	Pontiac	-*	-*
42	97	Chad Little	Roush Racing	Ford	-*	-*
Champion's Provisional
43	35	Darrell Waltrip	Tyler Jet Motorsports	Pontiac	-*	-*
Failed to qualify
44	71	Dave Marcis	Marcis Auto Racing	Chevrolet	28.253	127.420
45	21	Michael Waltrip	Wood Brothers Racing	Ford	28.395	126.783
46	45	Jeff Ward	BMR Motorsports	Chevrolet	29.052	123.916
Official qualifying results

*Time not available.

== Race results ==
Fin	St	#	Driver	Team	Make	Laps	Led	Status	Pts	Winnings
1	6	2	Rusty Wallace	Penske-Kranefuss Racing	Ford	257	196	running	185	$78,005
2	11	6	Mark Martin	Roush Racing	Ford	257	1	running	175	$68,430
3	39	3	Dale Earnhardt	Richard Childress Racing	Chevrolet	257	0	running	165	$57,175
4	38	99	Jeff Burton	Roush Racing	Ford	257	1	running	165	$50,512
5	10	13	Ted Musgrave	Elliott-Marino Racing	Ford	257	0	running	155	$33,950
6	19	43	John Andretti	Petty Enterprises	Pontiac	257	0	running	150	$46,540
7	12	24	Jeff Gordon	Hendrick Motorsports	Chevrolet	257	0	running	146	$47,040
8	3	81	Kenny Wallace	FILMAR Racing	Ford	257	0	running	142	$30,680
9	15	26	Johnny Benson Jr.	Roush Racing	Ford	257	0	running	138	$31,730
10	29	5	Terry Labonte	Hendrick Motorsports	Chevrolet	257	2	running	139	$40,880
11	5	98	Rich Bickle	Cale Yarborough Motorsports	Ford	257	0	running	130	$33,230
12	16	40	Sterling Marlin	Team SABCO	Chevrolet	256	0	running	127	$21,930
13	25	16	Kevin Lepage (R)	Roush Racing	Ford	256	0	running	124	$29,830
14	14	22	Ward Burton	Bill Davis Racing	Pontiac	256	0	running	121	$28,230
15	17	91	Todd Bodine	LJ Racing	Chevrolet	256	0	running	118	$24,055
16	8	31	Mike Skinner	Richard Childress Racing	Chevrolet	256	0	running	115	$20,955
17	24	77	Robert Pressley	Jasper Motorsports	Ford	256	0	running	112	$20,705
18	32	42	Joe Nemechek	Team SABCO	Chevrolet	256	0	running	109	$26,780
19	30	90	Dick Trickle	Donlavey Racing	Ford	256	0	running	106	$27,380
20	42	97	Chad Little	Roush Racing	Ford	256	1	running	108	$21,345
21	40	4	Bobby Hamilton	Morgan–McClure Motorsports	Chevrolet	255	0	running	100	$30,970
22	1	33	Ken Schrader	Andy Petree Racing	Chevrolet	255	53	running	102	$36,645
23	37	18	Bobby Labonte	Joe Gibbs Racing	Pontiac	255	0	running	94	$30,620
24	35	1	Steve Park (R)	Dale Earnhardt, Inc.	Chevrolet	255	0	running	91	$18,870
25	23	50	Wally Dallenbach Jr.	Hendrick Motorsports	Chevrolet	255	0	running	88	$25,745
26	18	23	Jimmy Spencer	Travis Carter Enterprises	Ford	254	3	running	90	$25,620
27	21	10	Ricky Rudd	Rudd Performance Motorsports	Ford	254	0	running	82	$31,895
28	33	46	Jeff Green	Team SABCO	Chevrolet	254	0	running	79	$18,470
29	7	75	Rick Mast	Butch Mock Motorsports	Ford	254	0	running	76	$18,445
30	41	36	Ricky Craven	MB2 Motorsports	Pontiac	254	0	running	73	$24,920
31	43	35	Darrell Waltrip	Tyler Jet Motorsports	Pontiac	253	0	running	70	$15,395
32	20	88	Dale Jarrett	Robert Yates Racing	Ford	253	0	running	67	$34,595
33	36	30	Derrike Cope	Bahari Racing	Pontiac	253	0	running	64	$22,070
34	26	7	Geoff Bodine	Mattei Motorsports	Ford	253	0	running	61	$22,045
35	27	96	Mike Bliss	American Equipment Racing	Chevrolet	252	0	running	58	$15,020
36	31	44	Kyle Petty	Petty Enterprises	Pontiac	252	0	running	55	$21,995
37	9	41	David Green	Larry Hedrick Motorsports	Chevrolet	251	0	running	52	$21,950
38	4	94	Bill Elliott	Elliott-Marino Racing	Ford	250	0	running	49	$22,090
39	34	9	Jerry Nadeau (R)	Melling Racing	Ford	247	0	running	46	$14,890
40	2	28	Kenny Irwin Jr. (R)	Robert Yates Racing	Ford	247	0	running	43	$30,390
41	28	78	Gary Bradberry	Triad Motorsports	Ford	243	0	overheating	40	$14,890
42	22	12	Jeremy Mayfield	Penske-Kranefuss Racing	Ford	237	0	running	37	$21,890
43	13	11	Brett Bodine	Brett Bodine Racing	Ford	46	0	handling	34	$21,890
Official race results

Previous race: 1998 Pepsi 400	NASCAR Winston Cup Series; 1998 season	Next race: 1998 AC Delco 400
