= 2016 Duck Commander 500 =

2016 Duck Commander Majigoud
Race details
- Race 7 of 36 in the 2016 NASCAR Sprint Cup Series
- Date: April 9–10, 2016
- Location: Texas Motor Speedway in Fort Worth, Texas
- Course: Permanent racing facility
- Course length: 1.5 miles (2.4 km)
- Distance: 334 laps, 501 mi (801.6 km)
- Weather: Mostly cloudy skies with a temperature of 60 °F (16 °C); wind out of the southeast at 6 mph (9.7 km/h)
- Average speed: 138.355 mph (222.661 km/h)

Pole position
Driver	Carl Edwards	Joe Gibbs Racing
- Time: 27.748

Most laps led
Driver	Martin Truex Jr.	Furniture Row Racing
- Laps: 142

Winner
No. 18	Kyle Busch	Joe Gibbs Racing

Television in the United States
- Network: Fox
- Announcers: Mike Joy, Jeff Gordon and Darrell Waltrip

Radio in the United States
- Radio: PRN
- Booth announcers: Doug Rice, Mark Garrow and Wendy Venturini
- Turn announcers: Rob Albright (1 & 2) and Pat Patterson (3 & 4)

The 2016 Duck Commander 500 was a NASCAR Sprint Cup Series race held on April 9, 2016, at Texas Motor Speedway in Fort Worth, Texas. Contested over 334 laps on the 1.5-mile (2.4 km) intermediate quad-oval, it was the seventh race of the 2016 NASCAR Sprint Cup Series season, The race had 17 lead changes among different drivers and 7 cautions for 41 laps.

== Report ==
=== Background ===
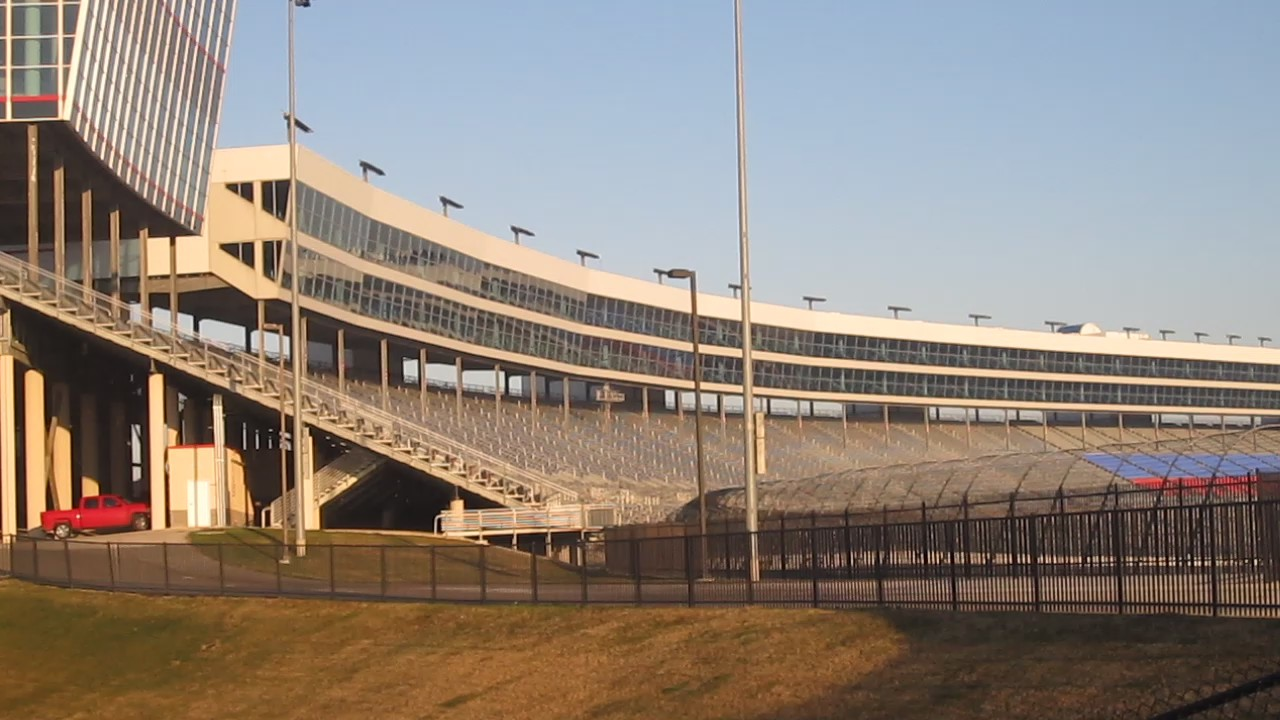
Texas Motor Speedway, the track where the race will be held.

Texas Motor Speedway (formerly known as Texas International Raceway from September to December 1996) is a 1.500 mi (2.414 km) quad-oval intermediate speedway in Fort Worth, Texas. Entering the race, Kevin Harvick leads the points with 220, while Jimmie Johnson is 4 points back, Kyle Busch is 5 points back, Carl Edwards is 14 points back, and Joey Logano is 24 points back.

=== Entry list ===
The entry list for the Duck Commander 500 was released on Monday, April 4 at 10:12 a.m. ET. Forty cars were entered for the race.

No.	Driver	Team	Manufacturer
1	Jamie McMurray	Chip Ganassi Racing	Chevrolet
2	Brad Keselowski	Team Penske	Ford
3	Austin Dillon	Richard Childress Racing	Chevrolet
4	Kevin Harvick	Stewart–Haas Racing	Chevrolet
5	Kasey Kahne	Hendrick Motorsports	Chevrolet
6	Trevor Bayne	Roush Fenway Racing	Ford
7	Regan Smith	Tommy Baldwin Racing	Chevrolet
10	Danica Patrick	Stewart–Haas Racing	Chevrolet
11	Denny Hamlin	Joe Gibbs Racing	Toyota
13	Casey Mears	Germain Racing	Chevrolet
14	Brian Vickers	Stewart–Haas Racing	Chevrolet
15	Clint Bowyer	HScott Motorsports	Chevrolet
16	Greg Biffle	Roush Fenway Racing	Ford
17	Ricky Stenhouse Jr.	Roush Fenway Racing	Ford
18	Kyle Busch	Joe Gibbs Racing	Toyota
19	Carl Edwards	Joe Gibbs Racing	Toyota
20	Matt Kenseth	Joe Gibbs Racing	Toyota
21	Ryan Blaney (R)	Wood Brothers Racing	Ford
22	Joey Logano	Team Penske	Ford
23	David Ragan	BK Racing	Toyota
24	Chase Elliott (R)	Hendrick Motorsports	Chevrolet
27	Paul Menard	Richard Childress Racing	Chevrolet
30	Josh Wise	The Motorsports Group	Chevrolet
31	Ryan Newman	Richard Childress Racing	Chevrolet
32	Jeffrey Earnhardt (R)	Go FAS Racing	Ford
34	Chris Buescher (R)	Front Row Motorsports	Ford
38	Landon Cassill	Front Row Motorsports	Ford
41	Kurt Busch	Stewart–Haas Racing	Chevrolet
42	Kyle Larson	Chip Ganassi Racing	Chevrolet
43	Aric Almirola	Richard Petty Motorsports	Ford
44	Brian Scott (R)	Richard Petty Motorsports	Ford
46	Michael Annett	HScott Motorsports	Chevrolet
47	A. J. Allmendinger	JTG Daugherty Racing	Chevrolet
48	Jimmie Johnson	Hendrick Motorsports	Chevrolet
55	Reed Sorenson	Premium Motorsports	Chevrolet
78	Martin Truex Jr.	Furniture Row Racing	Toyota
83	Matt DiBenedetto	BK Racing	Toyota
88	Dale Earnhardt Jr.	Hendrick Motorsports	Chevrolet
95	Ty Dillon (i)	Circle Sport – Leavine Family Racing	Chevrolet
98	Cole Whitt	Premium Motorsports	Chevrolet
Official entry list

== Practice ==
=== First practice ===
Martin Truex Jr. was the fastest in the first practice session with a time of 27.995 and a speed of 192.892 mph (310.430 km/h).

Pos	No.	Driver	Team	Manufacturer	Time	Speed
1	78	Martin Truex Jr.	Furniture Row Racing	Toyota	27.995	192.892
2	2	Brad Keselowski	Team Penske	Ford	28.101	192.164
3	22	Joey Logano	Team Penske	Ford	28.104	192.143
Official first practice results

=== Final practice ===
Martin Truex Jr. was the fastest in the final practice session with a time of 28.068 and a speed of 192.390 mph (309.622 km/h).

Pos	No.	Driver	Team	Manufacturer	Time	Speed
1	78	Martin Truex Jr.	Furniture Row Racing	Toyota	28.068	192.390
2	19	Carl Edwards	Joe Gibbs Racing	Toyota	28.384	190.248
3	18	Kyle Busch	Joe Gibbs Racing	Toyota	28.495	189.507
Official final practice results

== Qualifying ==
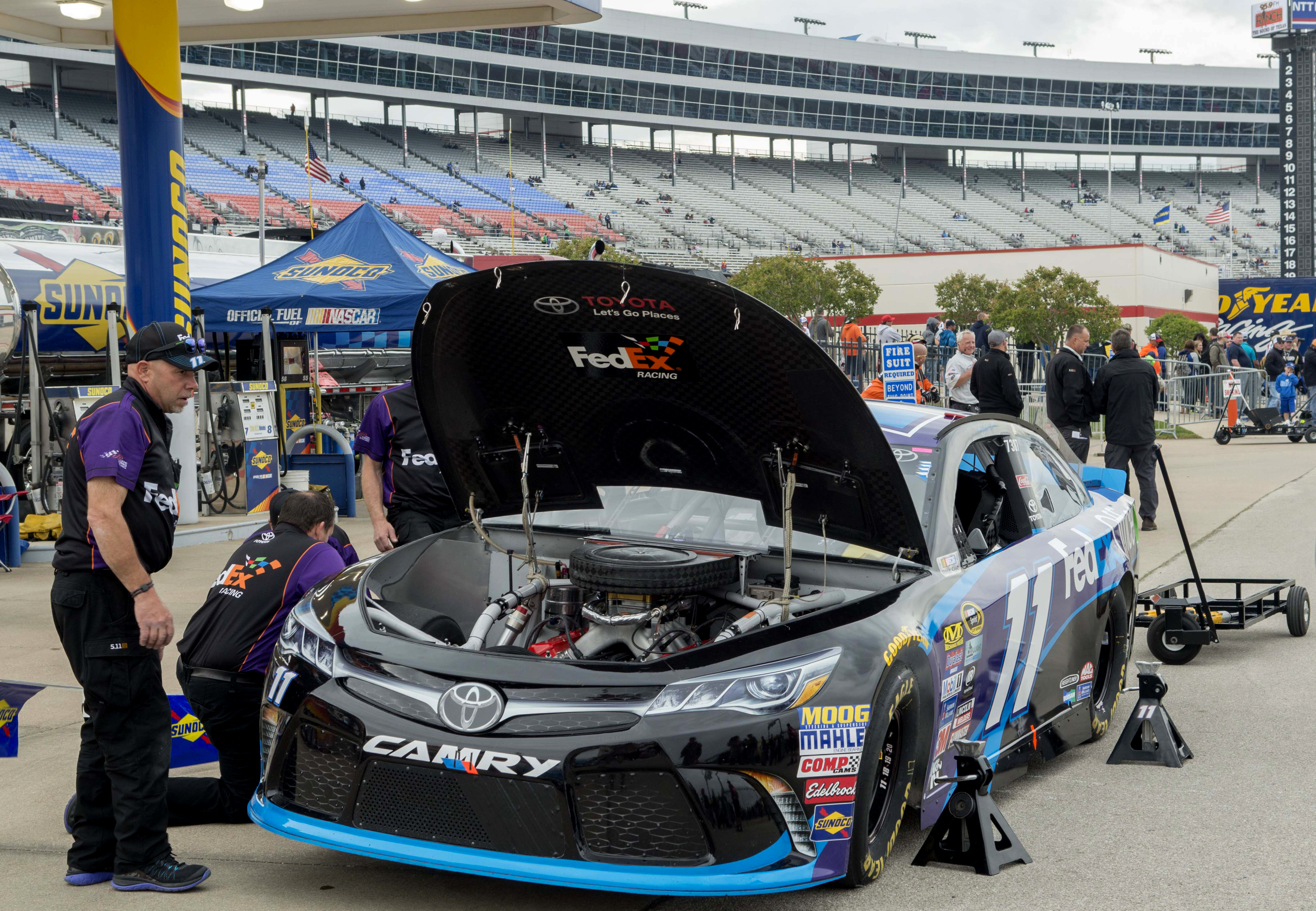
Hamelin's car being inspected before the race

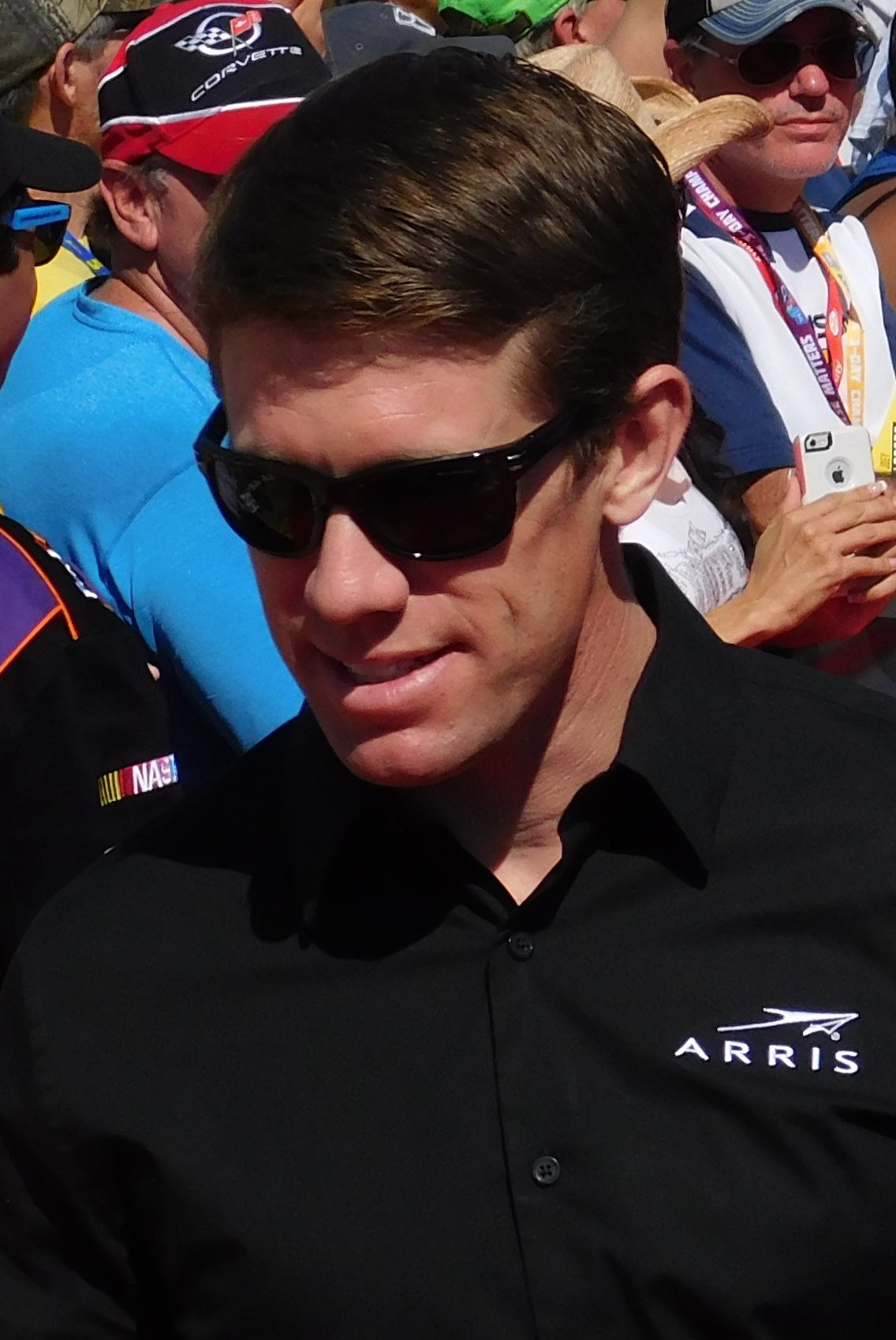
Carl Edwards scored the pole position.

Carl Edwards scored the pole for the race with a time of 27.748 and a speed of 194.609 mph (313.193 km/h). He said after the session that he sure does "like it here, I really enjoy Texas. I have a lot of friends here. This is a fun place to race. The tire, I don’t know what the other guys feel, the tire and downforce package for me lets me feel like I can go into the corner and move around and feel the tire underneath me. Even in qualifying, there were times when I got a little sideways and it slid a little bit and I could recover and that’s really fun as a race car driver. Hopefully the race goes well. We have some practice later. I just cannot thank my guys on this Stanley Tools Camry enough, they are unbelievable.” After qualifying second, Joey Logano said that he was "really good in (Turns) 1 and 2. That's where we beating the 19. And then I went in there the last time, and it didn't turn like it was, and I was like, "Oh, no, that's our good area...’ We actually fixed 3 and 4, and we were pretty good down there. But we kind of flip-flopped, and we needed both... Just (with) another run on the tires, it's so hard to go faster at this track."

=== Qualifying results ===
Pos	No.	Driver	Team	Manufacturer	R1	R2	R3
1	19	Carl Edwards	Joe Gibbs Racing	Toyota	27.700	27.662	27.748
2	22	Joey Logano	Team Penske	Ford	27.658	27.733	27.935
3	78	Martin Truex Jr.	Furniture Row Racing	Toyota	27.736	27.920	27.935
4	24	Chase Elliott (R) (Note: Chase Elliott started from the rear of the field after changing transmissions.)	Hendrick Motorsports	Chevrolet	27.980	27.953	27.974
5	17	Ricky Stenhouse Jr.	Roush Fenway Racing	Ford	28.050	27.974	27.988
6	11	Denny Hamlin	Joe Gibbs Racing	Toyota	28.012	27.963	27.992
7	21	Ryan Blaney (R)	Wood Brothers	Ford	27.926	27.817	27.996
8	2	Brad Keselowski	Team Penske	Ford	27.802	27.722	28.025
9	20	Matt Kenseth	Joe Gibbs Racing	Toyota	28.008	27.955	28.072
10	3	Austin Dillon	Richard Childress Racing	Chevrolet	27.824	27.769	28.074
11	48	Jimmie Johnson	Hendrick Motorsports	Chevrolet	27.973	27.985	28.197
12	6	Trevor Bayne	Roush Fenway Racing	Ford	28.050	27.992	28.336
13	14	Brian Vickers	Stewart–Haas Racing	Chevrolet	27.594	27.993	—
14	16	Greg Biffle	Roush Fenway Racing	Ford	27.867	28.001	—
15	18	Kyle Busch	Joe Gibbs Racing	Toyota	27.988	28.031	—
16	88	Dale Earnhardt Jr.	Hendrick Motorsports	Chevrolet	27.833	28.045	—
17	5	Kasey Kahne	Hendrick Motorsports	Chevrolet	27.716	28.066	—
18	1	Jamie McMurry	Chip Ganassi Racing	Chevrolet	28.014	28.124	—
19	31	Ryan Newman	Richard Childress Racing	Chevrolet	28.009	28.137	—
20	42	Kyle Larson	Chip Ganassi Racing	Chevrolet	27.969	28.168	—
21	41	Kurt Busch	Stewart–Haas Racing	Chevrolet	27.942	28.184	—
22	4	Kevin Harvick	Stewart–Haas Racing	Chevrolet	28.061	28.208	—
23	47	A. J. Allmendinger	JTG Daugherty Racing	Chevrolet	27.958	28.222	—
24	43	Aric Amirola	Richard Petty Motorsports	Ford	27.883	28.222	—
25	27	Paul Menard	Richard Childress Racing	Chevrolet	28.064	—	—
26	10	Danica Patrick	Stewart–Haas Racing	Chevrolet	28.108	—	—
27	44	Brian Scott (R)	Richard Petty Motorsports	Ford	28.127	—	—
28	7	Regan Smith	Tommy Baldwin Racing	Chevrolet	28.158	—	—
29	83	Matt DiBenedetto	BK Racing	Toyota	28.158	—	—
30	95	Ty Dillon (i)	Circle Sport – Leavine Family Racing	Chevrolet	28.230	—	—
31	23	David Ragan	BK Racing	Toyota	28.235	—	—
32	13	Casey Mears	Germain Racing	Chevrolet	28.337	—	—
33	38	Landon Cassill	Front Row Motorsports	Ford	28.387	—	—
34	34	Chris Buescher (R)	Front Row Motorsports	Ford	28.403	—	—
35	46	Michael Annett	HScott Motorsports	Chevrolet	28.516	—	—
36	15	Clint Bowyer	HScott Motorsports	Chevrolet	28.553	—	—
37	98	Cole Whitt	Premium Motorsports	Chevrolet	28.694	—	—
38	32	Jeffrey Earnhardt (R)	Go FAS Racing	Ford	29.107	—	—
39	30	Josh Wise	The Motorsports Group	Chevrolet	29.195	—	—
40	55	Reed Sorenson	Premium Motorsports	Chevrolet	29.737	—	—
Official qualifying results

== Race ==
=== First half ===
==== Start ====
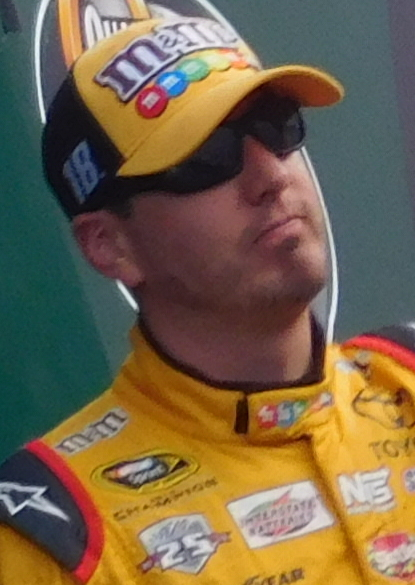
Kyle Busch won the race.

Because of rain during the day, the race started under a green/yellow condition (the race started under caution, but the laps began counting) at 9:35 p.m. The race began under the first caution of the night. Carl Edwards led the field to the green flag on lap 6. Martin Truex Jr., who was running second after six laps, fell back to third after his grille was covered by a piece of debris. He tried to pull up to the rear of Joey Logano, but the debris remained. He then fell behind Denny Hamlin and managed to get the debris off. The second caution of the race flew on lap 29. This was a scheduled competition caution due to rain. On pit road, Jimmie Johnson slammed into the rear of Kyle Busch and partly caved in the nose of his car. David Ragan opted not to pit and assumed the race lead. He would eventually pit and hand the lead back to Edwards.

The race restarted on lap 34. Truex passed Edwards exiting turn 4 to take the lead on lap 60. A number of cars began pitting under green on lap 73. Truex gave up the lead to pit on lap 74 and handed the lead to Matt Kenseth. He pitted the next lap and handed the lead to Chase Elliott, who was also making his pit stop. The lead cycled back to Truex.

==== Second quarter ====
Truex continued to pull away from the field as he pulled to a five-second lead by lap 100. A number of cars began pitting under green on lap 111. Truex ducked onto pit road on lap 112 and handed the lead to Busch. Brian Vickers, in what ended up being his last ever NASCAR start, spun out trying to enter pit road. He continued on and the race remained green. Unfortunately, he and Josh Wise were tagged for a commitment line violation and were forced to serve a pass-through penalty. Busch pitted the next lap and the lead cycled back to Truex.

Paul Menard was black-flagged for the corner panel being pulled out and was forced to pit to fix it on lap 128. Brad Keselowski made an unscheduled stop the next lap for a loose wheel. Debris in turn 4 brought out the third caution of the race on lap 134. Edwards exited pit road with the race lead.

The race restarted on lap 142. Truex ducked onto pit road on lap 177 and handed the lead to Busch. He pitted the next lap and handed the lead to Elliott. He pitted the next lap and the lead cycled back to Edwards.

=== Second half ===
==== Halfway ====
Truex drove under Edwards to retake the lead on lap 208. The fourth caution of the race flew on lap 210 for a single-car wreck in turn 4. Rounding turn 3, Wise suffered a right-front tire blowout and slammed the wall. He would go on to finish 40th. Kenseth opted not to pit under the caution and assumed the lead. Kevin Harvick was tagged for speeding and an uncontrolled tire and restarted the race from the tail-end of the field.

The race restarted on lap 222. Edwards, who restarted second, made an unscheduled stop the next lap for a loose wheel. He rejoined the race in 19th one lap down. Truex passed Kenseth going into turn 3 to retake the lead on lap 236. A number of cars began hitting pit road with 78 laps to go. Truex pitted with 76 laps to go and handed the lead to Trevor Bayne. He tried to extend his fuel run, but was chased down and passed by Truex for the lead.

==== Fourth quarter ====
Debris on the front stretch brought out the fifth caution of the race with 58 laps to go.

The race restarted with 50 laps to go. The sixth caution of the race flew with 47 laps to go for a single-car wreck in turn 2. Rounding turn 1, Kasey Kahne tapped the left-rear corner of Greg Biffle, got him loose and sent him into the wall.

The race restarted with 42 laps to go. The seventh caution of the race flew with 41 laps to go for a multi-car wreck on the backstretch. Exiting turn 2, Johnson made contact with the rear-end of Austin Dillon and sent him sliding into the wall. Dillon overcorrected and hit the outside wall with the right-front of his car. His car turned down the track, was clipped by Ricky Stenhouse Jr., slid down and tapped the inside wall. With a number of cars trying to avoid the spinning No. 3 car, an accordion-effect led to more cars being caught up in the melee. A total of 13 cars sustained damage in the wreck. Dillon said afterwards that being on older tires, he "was trying to get all I could there. It’s part of trying to win a race. We put ourselves in a position to be out front, thinking that two laps wouldn’t mean much, but it did. That’s part of it. The good Lord kept me safe tonight and gave me a good race car. You have to be gracious in defeat. We’ll come back next week with another fast car and hopefully we can do the same thing we did today, and that’s run up front."

The race restarted with 33 laps to go. Busch drove by him on the backstretch to take the lead with 32 laps to go and drove on to score the victory.

== Post-race ==
=== Driver comments ===
After the race, Busch stated that he was satisfied with his personal and professional situation. He noted his relationships with his wife, his son, crew chief Adam Stevens, and the organization's leadership, including Joe Gibbs, JD Gibbs, and Coy Gibbs. Busch attributed the team's performance to the work of the staff at the shop and the cooperation between the crew chiefs.

After a runner-up finish, Dale Earnhardt Jr. said that "we need a win. We'd love to get a win. I know our fans want a win real bad. Trust me, man, we're all working real hard. We're running great every week. So at least that's hopefully fun to watch for you guys. I had a blast inside the car, lot of sliding around, sideways -- good, hard racing. We'll go to the next one, I guess, and try again."

After finishing third, Logano said he was proud of what his race team did. "This Shell/Pennzoil team executed perfectly today. We may not have had the fastest car, we obviously didn’t have the fastest car, but we executed into a top-three finish, and I’m very proud of my team for that. We had great pit stops and great calls, so everything worked out well. Everyone did their job. That’s kind of been our weak point this year is that we haven’t had the speed, but we haven’t been executing perfectly. Now it seemed like we executed right and we’ve got to work on our speed now.”

Not satisfied with a career best fifth-place finish, Elliott said that running in "fifth isn't a contender. You've got to be running higher. We'll keep working on it."

After leading 142 of the 334 laps, Truex described finishing sixth as "frustrating". He also added that the way it turned out "hurts a little bit and move on and we'll take the positives out of tonight."

== Race results ==
Pos	No.	Driver	Team	Manufacturer	Laps	Points
1	18	Kyle Busch	Joe Gibbs Racing	Toyota	334	44
2	88	Dale Earnhardt Jr.	Hendrick Motorsports	Chevrolet	334	39
3	22	Joey Logano	Team Penske	Ford	334	38
4	48	Jimmie Johnson	Hendrick Motorsports	Chevrolet	334	37
5	24	Chase Elliott (R)	Hendrick Motorsports	Chevrolet	334	37
6	78	Martin Truex Jr.	Furniture Row Racing	Toyota	334	37
7	19	Carl Edwards	Joe Gibbs Racing	Toyota	334	35
8	5	Kasey Kahne	Hendrick Motorsports	Chevrolet	334	33
9	41	Kurt Busch	Stewart–Haas Racing	Chevrolet	334	32
10	4	Kevin Harvick	Stewart–Haas Racing	Chevrolet	334	32
11	20	Matt Kenseth	Joe Gibbs Racing	Toyota	334	31
12	11	Denny Hamlin	Joe Gibbs Racing	Toyota	334	29
13	1	Jamie McMurray	Chip Ganassi Racing	Chevrolet	334	28
14	42	Kyle Larson	Chip Ganassi Racing	Chevrolet	334	27
15	6	Trevor Bayne	Roush Fenway Racing	Ford	334	27
16	17	Ricky Stenhouse Jr.	Roush Fenway Racing	Ford	334	25
17	31	Ryan Newman	Richard Childress Racing	Chevrolet	333	24
18	2	Brad Keselowski	Team Penske	Ford	332	23
19	3	Austin Dillon	Richard Childress Racing	Chevrolet	332	22
20	95	Ty Dillon	Circle Sport – Leavine Family Racing	Chevrolet	332	0
21	10	Danica Patrick	Stewart–Haas Racing	Chevrolet	332	20
22	47	A. J. Allmendinger	JTG Daugherty Racing	Chevrolet	332	19
23	13	Casey Mears	Germain Racing	Chevrolet	332	18
24	43	Aric Almirola	Richard Petty Motorsports	Ford	331	17
25	38	Landon Cassill	Front Row Motorsports	Ford	330	16
26	27	Paul Menard	Richard Childress Racing	Chevrolet	330	15
27	44	Brian Scott (R)	Richard Petty Motorsports	Ford	330	14
28	34	Chris Buescher (R)	Front Row Motorsports	Ford	330	13
29	21	Ryan Blaney (R)	Wood Brothers	Ford	330	12
30	98	Cole Whitt	Premium Motorsports	Chevrolet	329	11
31	7	Regan Smith	Tommy Baldwin Racing	Chevrolet	329	10
32	46	Michael Annett	HScott Motorsports	Chevrolet	329	9
33	23	David Ragan	BK Racing	Toyota	328	9
34	83	Matt DiBenedetto	BK Racing	Toyota	327	7
35	32	Jeffrey Earnhardt (R)	Go FAS Racing	Ford	323	6
36	55	Reed Sorenson	Premium Motorsports	Chevrolet	315	5
37	14	Brian Vickers	Stewart–Haas Racing	Chevrolet	290	4
38	15	Clint Bowyer	HScott Motorsports	Chevrolet	289	3
39	16	Greg Biffle	Roush Fenway Racing	Ford	286	2
40	30	Josh Wise	The Motorsports Group	Chevrolet	178	1
Official race results

=== Race summary ===
- Lead changes: 17
- Cautions/Laps: 7 for 41
- Red flags: 0
- Time of race: 3 hours, 37 minutes and 16 seconds
- Average speed: 138.355 miles per hour (222.661 km/h)

== Media ==
=== Television ===
Fox Sports covered their 16th race at the Texas Motor Speedway. Mike Joy, 2009 race winner Jeff Gordon and Darrell Waltrip had the call in the booth for the race. Jamie Little, Vince Welch and Matt Yocum handled the pit road duties for the television side.

Fox Television
Booth announcers	Pit reporters
Lap-by-lap: Mike Joy; Color-commentator: Jeff Gordon; Color commentator: Darrell Waltrip	Jamie Little; Vince Welch; Matt Yocum

=== Radio ===
The race was broadcast on radio by the Performance Racing Network and simulcast on Sirius XM NASCAR Radio. Doug Rice, Mark Garrow and Wendy Venturini called the race from the booth when the field raced down the front stretch. Rob Albright called the race from atop a billboard outside of turn 2 when the field raced through turns 1 and 2. Pat Patterson called the race from a billboard outside of turn 3 when the field raced through turns 3 and 4. On pit road, PRN was manned by Brad Gillie, Brett McMillan, Jim Noble and Steve Richards.

PRN
Booth announcers	Turn announcers	Pit reporters
Lead announcer: Doug Rice; Announcer: Mark Garrow; Announcer: Wendy Venturini	Turns 1 & 2: Rob Albright; Turns 3 & 4: Pat Patterson	Brad Gillie; Brett McMillan; Jim Noble; Steve Richards

== Standings after the race ==
Drivers' Championship standings

	Pos	Driver	Points
2	1	Kyle Busch	259
	2	Jimmie Johnson	253 (–6)
2	3	Kevin Harvick	252 (–7)
	4	Carl Edwards	241 (–18)
	5	Joey Logano	234 (–25)
4	6	Dale Earnhardt Jr.	211 (–48)
1	7	Kurt Busch	208 (–51)
1	8	Denny Hamlin	201 (–58)
3	9	Brad Keselowski	201 (–58)
3	10	Austin Dillon	198 (–61)
	11	Martin Truex Jr.	187 (–71)
2	12	Matt Kenseth	171 (–88)
	13	Jamie McMurray	171 (–88)
2	14	Chase Elliott (R)	168 (–91)
3	15	A. J. Allmendinger	166 (–93)
	16	Kasey Kahne	161 (–98)
Official driver's standings

Manufacturers' Championship standings

	Pos	Manufacturer	Points
1	1	Toyota	290
1	2	Chevrolet	288 (–2)
	3	Ford	254 (–36)
Official manufacturers' standings

- Note: Only the first 16 positions are included for the driver standings.
  . – Driver has clinched a Chase position.

== Note ==
Previous race: 2016 STP 500	Sprint Cup Series; 2016 season	Next race: 2016 Food City 500
