= 2016 STP 500 =

Race details
- Race 6 of 36 in the 2016 NASCAR Sprint Cup Series
- Date: April 3, 2016
- Location: Martinsville Speedway in Ridgeway, Virginia
- Course: Permanent racing facility
- Course length: 0.526 miles (0.847 km)
- Distance: 500 laps, 263 mi (423.5 km)
- Weather: Sunny clear blue skies with a temperature of 51 °F (11 °C); wind out of the west/northwest at 9 mph (14 km/h)
- Average speed: 80.088 mph (128.889 km/h)

Pole position
Driver	Joey Logano	Team Penske
- Time: 19.513

Most laps led
Driver	Kyle Busch	Joe Gibbs Racing
- Laps: 352

Winner
No. 18	Kyle Busch	Joe Gibbs Racing

Television in the United States
- Network: FS1
- Announcers: Mike Joy, Jeff Gordon and Darrell Waltrip
- Nielsen ratings: 2.2/5 (Overnight); 2.5/5 (Final); 4.2 million viewers

Radio in the United States
- Radio: MRN
- Booth announcers: Joe Moore, Jeff Striegle and Rusty Wallace
- Turn announcers: Dave Moody (Backstretch)

The 2016 STP 500 was a NASCAR Sprint Cup Series race held on April 3, 2016, at Martinsville Speedway in Ridgeway, Virginia. Contested over 500 laps on the .526 mile (.847 km) paperclip-shaped short track, it was the sixth race of the 2016 NASCAR Sprint Cup Series season. Kyle Busch won the race. A. J. Allmendinger finished second, while Kyle Larson, Austin Dillon and Brad Keselowski rounded out the top-five.

Joey Logano won the pole for the race and led 21 laps on his way to an 11th-place finish. Busch led a race high of 352 laps on his way to scoring the victory. The race had 11 lead changes among five different drivers and eight caution flag periods for 51 laps.

This was the 35th career victory for Busch, first of the season, first at Martinsville Speedway and ninth at the track for Joe Gibbs Racing. With the win, he moved up to third in the points standings. Despite being the winning manufacturer, Toyota left Martinsville trailing Chevrolet by three points in the manufacturer standings.

The STP 500 was carried by Fox Sports on the cable/satellite Fox Sports 1 network for the American television audience. The radio broadcast for the race was carried by the Motor Racing Network and Sirius XM NASCAR Radio.

== Report ==
=== Background ===
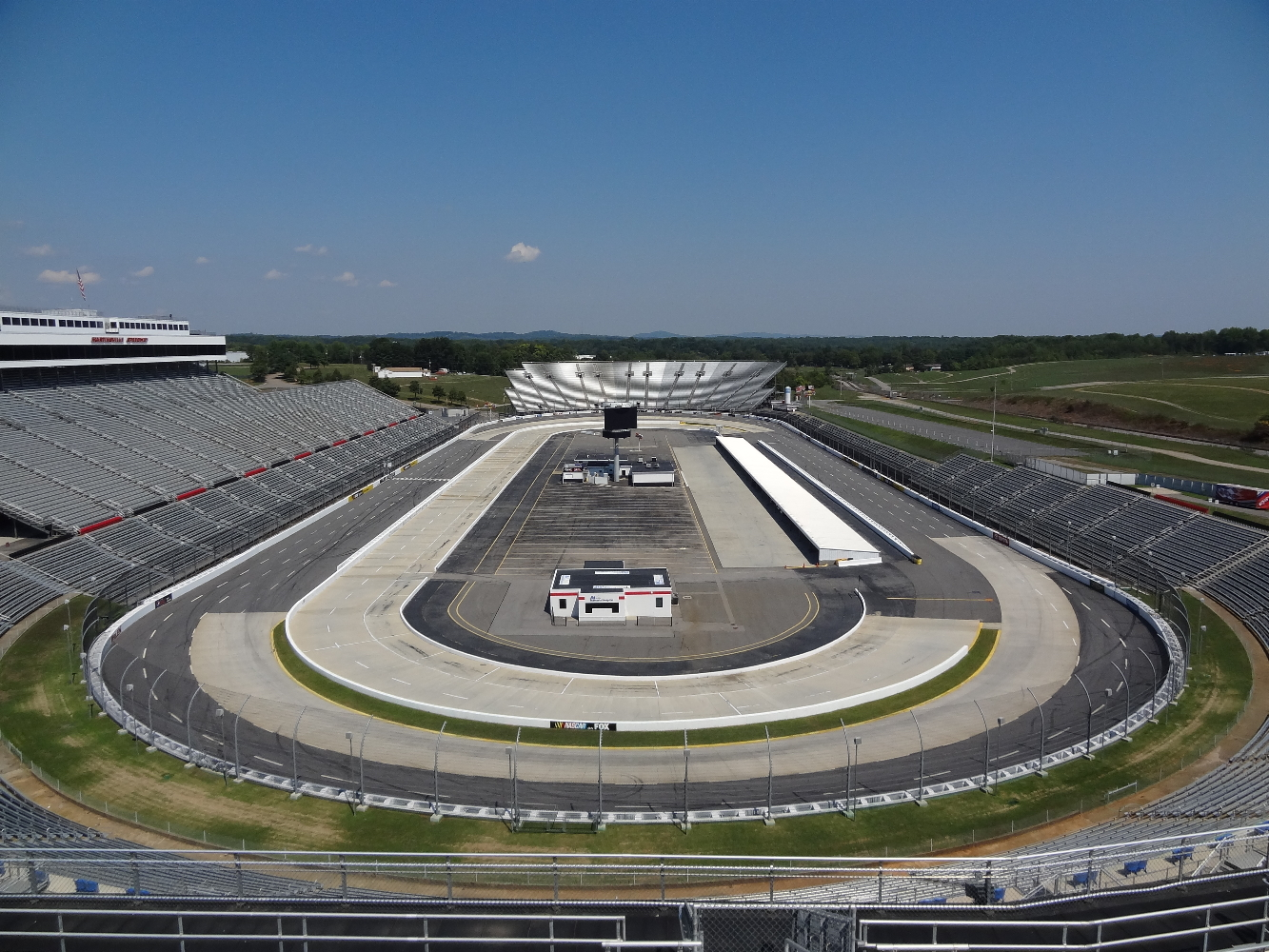
Martinsville Speedway, the track where the race was held.

Martinsville Speedway is a 0.526 mi (0.847 km) oval short track in Ridgeway, Virginia, United States, a community of Martinsville, Virginia. Entering the race, Kevin Harvick leads the points with 195, while Jimmie Johnson is 11 points back, Carl Edwards is 24 points back, and both Denny Hamlin and Kyle Busch are 25 points back.

=== Entry list ===
The entry list for the STP 500 was released on Monday, March 28 at 1:50 p.m. Eastern time. Forty cars were entered for the race.

No.	Driver	Team	Manufacturer
1	Jamie McMurray	Chip Ganassi Racing	Chevrolet
2	Brad Keselowski	Team Penske	Ford
3	Austin Dillon	Richard Childress Racing	Chevrolet
4	Kevin Harvick	Stewart–Haas Racing	Chevrolet
5	Kasey Kahne	Hendrick Motorsports	Chevrolet
6	Trevor Bayne	Roush Fenway Racing	Ford
7	Regan Smith	Tommy Baldwin Racing	Chevrolet
10	Danica Patrick	Stewart–Haas Racing	Chevrolet
11	Denny Hamlin	Joe Gibbs Racing	Toyota
13	Casey Mears	Germain Racing	Chevrolet
14	Brian Vickers	Stewart–Haas Racing	Chevrolet
15	Clint Bowyer	HScott Motorsports	Chevrolet
16	Greg Biffle	Roush Fenway Racing	Ford
17	Ricky Stenhouse Jr.	Roush Fenway Racing	Ford
18	Kyle Busch	Joe Gibbs Racing	Toyota
19	Carl Edwards	Joe Gibbs Racing	Toyota
20	Matt Kenseth	Joe Gibbs Racing	Toyota
21	Ryan Blaney (R)	Wood Brothers Racing	Ford
22	Joey Logano	Team Penske	Ford
23	David Ragan	BK Racing	Toyota
24	Chase Elliott (R)	Hendrick Motorsports	Chevrolet
27	Paul Menard	Richard Childress Racing	Chevrolet
30	Josh Wise	The Motorsports Group	Chevrolet
31	Ryan Newman	Richard Childress Racing	Chevrolet
32	Joey Gase (i)	Go FAS Racing	Ford
34	Chris Buescher (R)	Front Row Motorsports	Ford
38	Landon Cassill	Front Row Motorsports	Ford
41	Kurt Busch	Stewart–Haas Racing	Chevrolet
42	Kyle Larson	Chip Ganassi Racing	Chevrolet
43	Aric Almirola	Richard Petty Motorsports	Ford
44	Brian Scott (R)	Richard Petty Motorsports	Ford
46	Michael Annett	HScott Motorsports	Chevrolet
47	A. J. Allmendinger	JTG Daugherty Racing	Chevrolet
48	Jimmie Johnson	Hendrick Motorsports	Chevrolet
55	Reed Sorenson	Premium Motorsports	Chevrolet
78	Martin Truex Jr.	Furniture Row Racing	Toyota
83	Matt DiBenedetto	BK Racing	Toyota
88	Dale Earnhardt Jr.	Hendrick Motorsports	Chevrolet
95	Michael McDowell	Circle Sport – Leavine Family Racing	Chevrolet
98	Cole Whitt	Premium Motorsports	Chevrolet
Official entry list

== Practice ==
=== First practice ===
Brian Vickers was the fastest in the first practice session with a time of 19.485 and a speed of 97.182 mph (156.399 km/h). Trevor Bayne went to his backup car after crashing his primary in the final 30 seconds of the session.

Pos	No.	Driver	Team	Manufacturer	Time	Speed
1	14	Brian Vickers	Stewart–Haas Racing	Chevrolet	19.485	97.182
2	11	Denny Hamlin	Joe Gibbs Racing	Toyota	19.500	97.108
3	22	Joey Logano	Team Penske	Ford	19.504	97.088
Official first practice results

=== Second practice ===
Kasey Kahne was the fastest in the second practice session with a time of 19.710 and a speed of 96.073 mph (154.615 km/h).

Pos	No.	Driver	Team	Manufacturer	Time	Speed
1	5	Kasey Kahne	Hendrick Motorsports	Chevrolet	19.710	96.073
2	31	Ryan Newman	Richard Childress Racing	Chevrolet	19.756	95.849
3	78	Martin Truex Jr.	Furniture Row Racing	Toyota	19.788	95.694
Official second practice results

=== Final practice ===
Kyle Larson was the fastest in the final practice session with a time of 19.835 and a speed of 95.468 mph (153.641 km/h).

Pos	No.	Driver	Team	Manufacturer	Time	Speed
1	42	Kyle Larson	Chip Ganassi Racing	Chevrolet	19.835	95.468
2	18	Kyle Busch	Joe Gibbs Racing	Toyota	19.862	95.338
3	14	Brian Vickers	Stewart–Haas Racing	Chevrolet	19.869	95.304
Official final practice results

== Qualifying ==
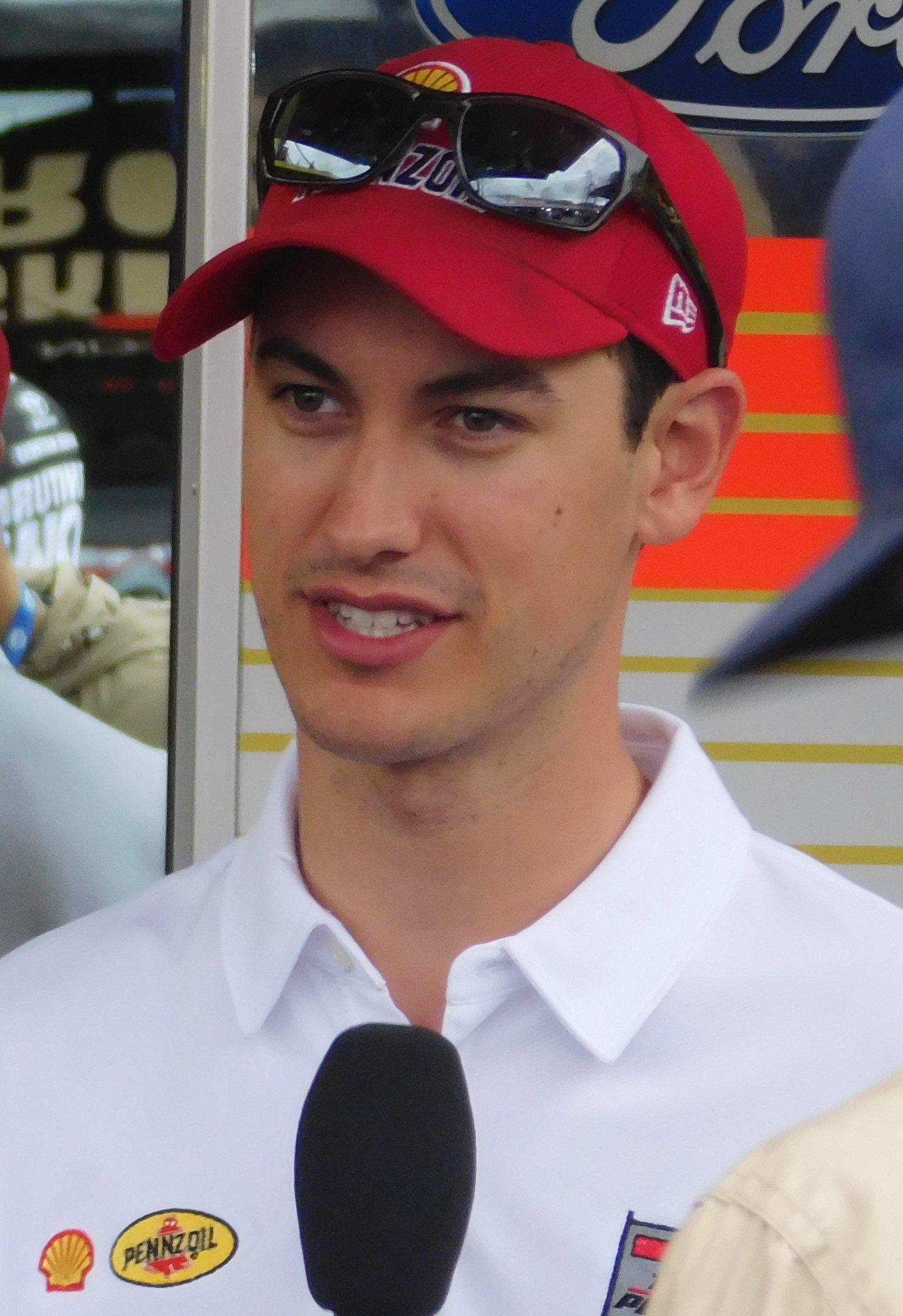
Joey Logano scored his third straight pole position at Martinsville.

Joey Logano scored the pole for the race with a time of 19.513 and a speed of 97.043 mph (156.176 km/h). He joined Jeff Gordon, Mark Martin, Darrell Waltrip and Glen Wood as the only drivers to have earned three-consecutive poles at Martinsville. He said afterwards that it was "nice to be able to go up here and do what we know how to do - execute qualifying like we know how to at this racetrack. Ever since we unloaded this morning it was top of the board, it was a fast racecar. We knew that. We just had to keep our heads in the game and do what we know how to do." He also added that he was "excited, pumped up, jacked up to come to this racetrack and show what we’re made of." After qualifying second, Kasey Kahne said that his performance felt "good. The car was really fast, this Great Clips Chevrolet. The guys did a nice job in practice and in qualifying. I just kept getting better with my laps...The car is fine. Just let me get my laps a little better. I feel good about it (the car). We had a top-10 here the last race, last year; with the backup car because I crashed it in qualifying and this car is better than our primary car was last time.” He also added that Logano "barely got us. But it is definitely a good starting spot. That was one of my goals today was to help out on pit road. Pit road is huge here. We have the best pit crew for stops, than anyone, in my opinion. And if I can help them on pit road, myself, and get a better spot, I think all that will be beneficial on Sunday." After qualifying third, Brian Vickers said he was "so close; the No. 22 was really strong. I thought we had it when he ran a 51 (19.51) I thought we could beat that. We made a small adjustment going into the last round and I don't know maybe that hurt us a little bit. It is so tight. We are fighting for hundredths of a second, thousandths of a second, but everybody on the No. 14 Chevrolet did a good job. I'm really proud of everyone. Mike (Bugarewicz, crew chief) gave me a great race car. Everyone at Stewart–Haas Racing, Chevy, it's an honor to put the Arnie’s Army and Janssen Chevrolet in the top three.”

=== Qualifying results ===
Pos	No.	Driver	Team	Manufacturer	R1	R2	R3
1	22	Joey Logano	Team Penske	Ford	19.474	19.386	19.513
2	5	Kasey Kahne	Hendrick Motorsports	Chevrolet	19.655	19.516	19.515
3	14	Brian Vickers	Stewart–Haas Racing	Chevrolet	19.479	19.513	19.549
4	27	Paul Menard	Richard Childress Racing	Chevrolet	19.533	19.458	19.551
5	31	Ryan Newman	Richard Childress Racing	Chevrolet	19.597	19.552	19.575
6	47	A. J. Allmendinger	JTG Daugherty Racing	Chevrolet	19.527	19.522	19.587
7	18	Kyle Busch	Joe Gibbs Racing	Toyota	19.592	19.579	19.591
8	11	Denny Hamlin	Joe Gibbs Racing	Toyota	19.640	19.572	19.594
9	20	Matt Kenseth	Joe Gibbs Racing	Toyota	19.588	19.552	19.635
10	24	Chase Elliott (R)	Hendrick Motorsports	Chevrolet	19.623	19.588	19.679
11	2	Brad Keselowski	Team Penske	Ford	19.584	19.574	19.683
12	21	Ryan Blaney (R)	Wood Brothers Racing	Ford	19.565	19.571	19.690
13	17	Ricky Stenhouse Jr.	Roush Fenway Racing	Ford	19.644	19.595	—
14	16	Greg Biffle	Roush Fenway Racing	Ford	19.578	19.598	—
15	1	Jamie McMurray	Chip Ganassi Racing	Chevrolet	19.700	19.599	—
16	78	Martin Truex Jr.	Furniture Row Racing	Toyota	19.580	19.609	—
17	42	Kyle Larson	Chip Ganassi Racing	Chevrolet	19.602	19.628	—
18	13	Casey Mears	Germain Racing	Chevrolet	19.631	19.629	—
19	4	Kevin Harvick	Stewart–Haas Racing	Chevrolet	19.540	19.651	—
20	43	Aric Almirola	Richard Petty Motorsports	Ford	19.698	19.675	—
21	88	Dale Earnhardt Jr.	Hendrick Motorsports	Chevrolet	19.678	19.715	—
22	23	David Ragan	BK Racing	Toyota	19.663	19.729	—
23	41	Kurt Busch	Stewart–Haas Racing	Chevrolet	19.640	19.767	—
24	48	Jimmie Johnson	Hendrick Motorsports	Chevrolet	19.701	19.784	—
25	19	Carl Edwards	Joe Gibbs Racing	Toyota	19.708	—	—
26	44	Brian Scott (R)	Richard Petty Motorsports	Ford	19.742	—	—
27	95	Michael McDowell	Circle Sport – Leavine Family Racing	Chevrolet	19.743	—	—
28	10	Danica Patrick	Stewart–Haas Racing	Chevrolet	19.748	—	—
29	3	Austin Dillon	Richard Childress Racing	Chevrolet	19.751	—	—
30	15	Clint Bowyer	HScott Motorsports	Chevrolet	19.758	—	—
31	98	Cole Whitt	Premium Motorsports	Chevrolet	19.775	—	—
32	6	Trevor Bayne	Roush Fenway Racing	Ford	19.805	—	—
33	38	Landon Cassill	Front Row Motorsports	Ford	19.809	—	—
34	7	Regan Smith	Tommy Baldwin Racing	Chevrolet	19.819	—	—
35	83	Matt DiBenedetto	BK Racing	Toyota	19.871	—	—
36	34	Chris Buescher (R)	Front Row Motorsports	Ford	19.880	—	—
37	32	Joey Gase (i)	Go FAS Racing	Ford	19.971	—	—
38	46	Michael Annett	HScott Motorsports	Chevrolet	20.092	—	—
39	30	Josh Wise	The Motorsports Group	Chevrolet	20.098	—	—
40	55	Reed Sorenson	Premium Motorsports	Chevrolet	0.000	—	—
Official qualifying results

== Race ==
=== First half ===
==== Start ====
Under clear blue Virginia skies, Joey Logano led the field to the green flag at 1:19 p.m. The first caution of the race flew on the fifth lap for a single-car spin in turn 2. Dale Earnhardt Jr. bounced off the side of David Ragan's car and spun out.

The race restarted on lap 10. Going into turn 3, Paul Menard dove under Logano to take the lead on lap 22. Kyle Busch dove under Menard going into turn 3 to take the lead on lap 33. The second caution of the race flew on lap 91 for a single-car spin in turn 2. Menard got into the left-rear corner of Brian Scott, sent him into Michael Annett and sent him spinning. Denny Hamlin and Brad Keselowski were tagged for speeding on pit road and restarted the race from the tail-end of the field.

The race restarted on lap 98. Kevin Harvick drove under Busch to take the lead on lap 101. He retook the lead on lap 107. Matt Kenseth drove by his teammate exiting turn 2 to take the lead on lap 133. The third caution of the race flew on lap 136 for a single-car wreck in turn 2. Regan Smith sent Ricky Stenhouse Jr. spinning into the wall.

==== Second quarter ====
The race restarted on lap 145. Busch drove by the outside of Kenseth going into turn 3 to retake the lead on lap 147. Harvick drove by Busch going into turn 1 to take the lead on lap 156. Aric Almirola retired from the race on lap 208 due to engine issues and would go on to finish last. The fourth caution of the race flew on lap 222 for a single-car wreck in turn 1. Hamlin's wheel hopped going into the turn and slammed the wall. He said afterwards that it was the "first time ever doing it here, so it’s a little embarrassing, but I mean we were the fastest car those last 30 laps and we got back to the top-five and I was making up a lot of my speed on entry. As the tires wear, the rears get hotter, less grip, you can’t brake at the same amount – it was really out of the blue. I didn’t ever have a hint of it up until that moment, so a bit of a rookie move on my part. Been around here too much to do something like that, but learning for the fall and I’m really encouraged about how good our car came up through the pack and I really thought we had a car that could win.” Harvick and Kenseth swapped the lead on pit road and the latter exited with the lead.

The race restarted on lap 228. Busch retook the lead on lap 230. The fifth caution of the race flew on lap 312 for a single-car wreck in turn 2. Josh Wise suffered a tire blowout and slammed the wall. Reed Sorenson was tagged for having too many crew members over the wall and restarted the race from the tail-end of the field.

=== Second half ===
==== Halfway ====
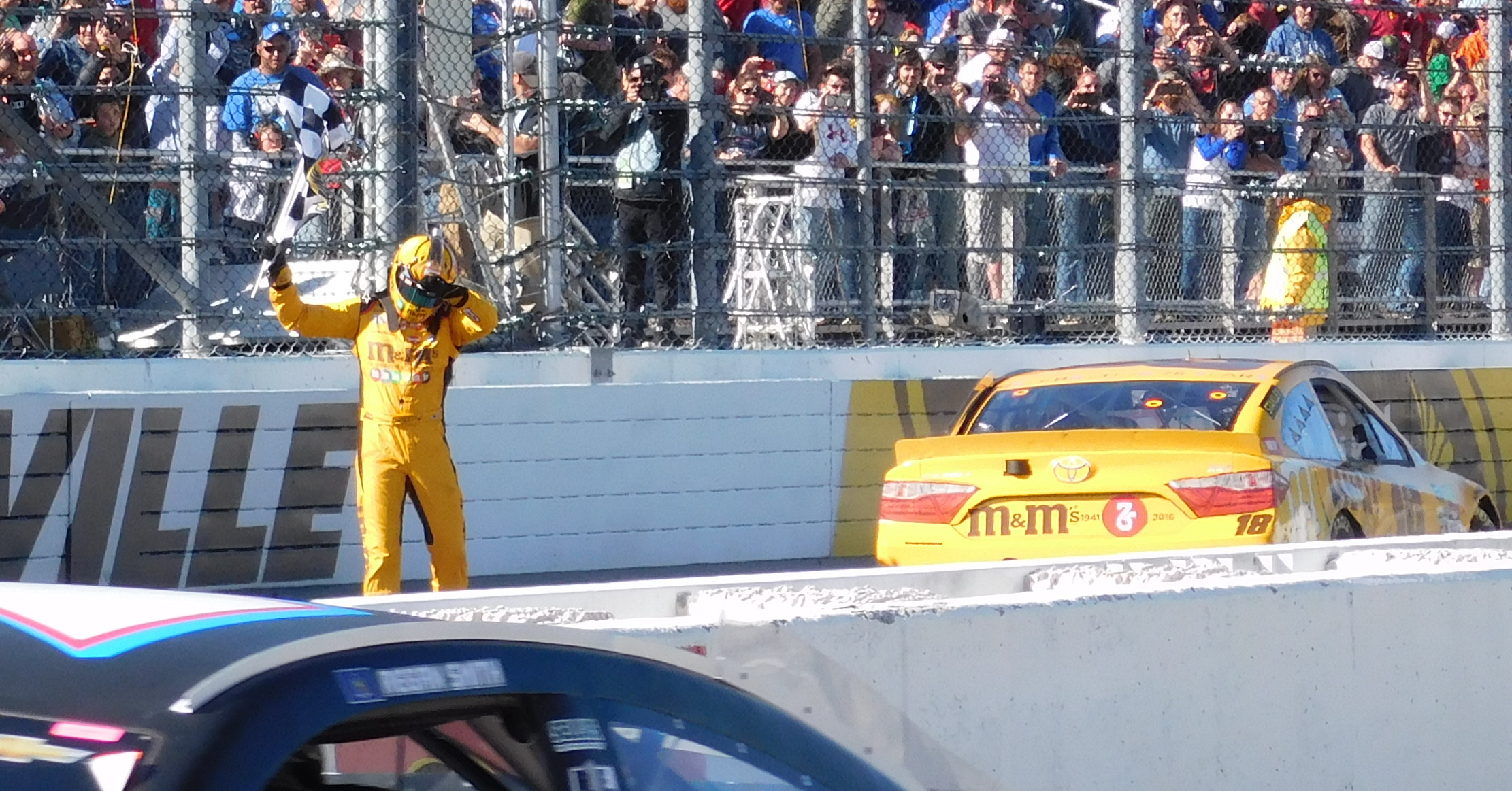
Kyle Busch won the race.

The race restarted on lap 321. Busch worked past Kenseth to retake the lead on lap 325. The sixth caution of the race flew with 117 laps to go for a single-car wreck in turn 2. Exiting the turn, Michael Annett got loose and spun out. Logano was tagged for an uncontrolled tire and restarted the race from the tail-end of the field.

==== Fourth quarter ====
The race restarted with 110 laps to go. The seventh caution of the race flew with 45 laps to go for a single-car wreck in turn 2. Regan Smith suffered a right-front tire blowout and slammed the wall. Chase Elliott was tagged for speeding on pit road and restarted the race from the tail-end of the field.

The race restarted with 34 laps to go. The eighth caution of the race flew with 17 laps to go for a single-car spin on the backstretch. Jamie McMurray suffered a left-front tire blowout, got hit in the rear and turned.

The race restarted with 14 laps and went green for the rest of the race. Busch drove on to score the checkered flag.

== Post-race ==
=== Driver comments ===
Busch said after the race that he "had a really good car through practice and Adam (Stevens, crew chief) made some really good adjustments overnight to keep us where we need to be in order to run up front all day, led a lot of laps, probably led the most laps there and to win here in Martinsville is pretty cool – finally get to take a clock home." He also added that he "can't say enough about this whole JGR team. The M&M's Camry was awesome in practice. We had a really good car through practice, and Adam made some really good adjustments overnight to keep us where we needed to be, running up front all day."

A. J. Allmendinger said of his second–place finish and his strong runs of late that they're "something that really started on the West Coast swing and coming through here, I feel like we've been at our best at the end of these races. We've maximized. That's the biggest thing we always say — if we can just maximize our finishes, whether they're top-fives or you're running 20th and you can get 18th an out of it, that's what we want to do.”

“It was a solid weekend for myself. I was able to do double-duty this week and I think that helped me get my rhythm early in the weekend,” Larson said. “It bettered myself each time I was on the track. Normally a truck does not drive anything like a Cup car. This is the only race track probably where it does. Getting more laps on this racetrack is the most important part for myself."

== Race results ==
Pos	No.	Driver	Team	Manufacturer	Laps	Points
1	18	Kyle Busch	Joe Gibbs Racing	Toyota	500	45
2	47	A. J. Allmendinger	JTG Daugherty Racing	Chevrolet	500	39
3	42	Kyle Larson	Chip Ganassi Racing	Chevrolet	500	38
4	3	Austin Dillon	Richard Childress Racing	Chevrolet	500	37
5	2	Brad Keselowski	Team Penske	Ford	500	36
6	19	Carl Edwards	Joe Gibbs Racing	Toyota	500	35
7	14	Brian Vickers	Stewart–Haas Racing	Chevrolet	500	34
8	27	Paul Menard	Richard Childress Racing	Chevrolet	500	34
9	48	Jimmie Johnson	Hendrick Motorsports	Chevrolet	500	32
10	31	Ryan Newman	Richard Childress Racing	Chevrolet	500	31
11	22	Joey Logano	Team Penske	Ford	500	31
12	16	Greg Biffle	Roush Fenway Racing	Ford	500	29
13	41	Kurt Busch	Stewart–Haas Racing	Chevrolet	500	28
14	88	Dale Earnhardt Jr.	Hendrick Motorsports	Chevrolet	500	27
15	20	Matt Kenseth	Joe Gibbs Racing	Toyota	500	27
16	10	Danica Patrick	Stewart–Haas Racing	Chevrolet	500	25
17	4	Kevin Harvick	Stewart–Haas Racing	Chevrolet	500	25
18	78	Martin Truex Jr.	Furniture Row Racing	Toyota	500	23
19	21	Ryan Blaney (R)	Wood Brothers Racing	Ford	500	22
20	24	Chase Elliott (R)	Hendrick Motorsports	Chevrolet	499	21
21	23	David Ragan	BK Racing	Toyota	499	20
22	5	Kasey Kahne	Hendrick Motorsports	Chevrolet	499	19
23	1	Jamie McMurray	Chip Ganassi Racing	Chevrolet	499	18
24	95	Michael McDowell	Circle Sport – Leavine Family Racing	Chevrolet	498	17
25	15	Clint Bowyer	HScott Motorsports	Chevrolet	497	16
26	44	Brian Scott (R)	Richard Petty Motorsports	Ford	496	15
27	6	Trevor Bayne	Roush Fenway Racing	Ford	496	14
28	38	Landon Cassill	Front Row Motorsports	Ford	495	13
29	83	Matt DiBenedetto	BK Racing	Toyota	495	12
30	98	Cole Whitt	Premium Motorsports	Chevrolet	495	11
31	13	Casey Mears	Germain Racing	Chevrolet	494	10
32	17	Ricky Stenhouse Jr.	Roush Fenway Racing	Ford	494	9
33	34	Chris Buescher (R)	Front Row Motorsports	Ford	491	8
34	7	Regan Smith	Tommy Baldwin Racing	Chevrolet	491	7
35	46	Michael Annett	HScott Motorsports	Chevrolet	490	6
36	32	Joey Gase (i)	Go FAS Racing	Ford	490	0
37	55	Reed Sorenson	Premium Motorsports	Chevrolet	490	4
38	30	Josh Wise	The Motorsports Group	Chevrolet	326	3
39	11	Denny Hamlin	Joe Gibbs Racing	Toyota	221	2
40	43	Aric Almirola	Richard Petty Motorsports	Ford	206	1
Official STP 500 results

=== Race summary ===
- Lead changes: 11
- Cautions: 8 for 51
- Red flags: 0
- Time of race: 3 hours, 17 minutes, and 2 seconds
- Average speed: 80.088 miles per hour (128.889 km/h)

== Media ==
=== Television ===
Fox Sports was covering their 16th race at the Martinsville Speedway. Mike Joy, nine-time Martinsville winner Jeff Gordon and 11-time Martinsville winner Darrell Waltrip called in the booth for the race. Jamie Little, Vince Welch and Matt Yocum handled pit road duties for the entire race.

FS1
Booth announcers	Pit reporters
Lap-by-lap: Mike Joy; Color-commentator: Jeff Gordon; Color commentator: Darrell Waltrip	Jamie Little; Vince Welch; Matt Yocum

=== Radio ===
MRN had the radio call for the race which would also be simulcasted on Sirius XM NASCAR Radio. Joe Moore, Jeff Striegle and seven-time Martinsville winner Rusty Wallace called the race in the booth as the cars were on the frontstretch. Dave Moody called the race from atop the turn 3 stands as the field is racing down the backstretch. Alex Hayden, Winston Kelley and Steve Post worked pit road for the radio side.

MRN
Booth announcers	Turn announcers	Pit reporters
Lead announcer: Joe Moore; Announcer: Jeff Striegle; Announcer: Rusty Wallace	Backstretch: Dave Moody	Alex Hayden; Winston Kelley; Steve Post

== Standings after the race ==
Drivers' Championship standings

	Pos	Driver	Points
	1	Kevin Harvick	220
	2	Jimmie Johnson	216 (–4)
2	3	Kyle Busch	215 (–5)
1	4	Carl Edwards	206 (–14)
1	5	Joey Logano	196 (–24)
3	6	Brad Keselowski	178 (–42)
3	7	Austin Dillon	176 (–44)
1	8	Kurt Busch	176 (–44)
5	9	Denny Hamlin	172 (–48)
2	10	Dale Earnhardt Jr.	172 (–48)
	11	Martin Truex Jr.	150 (–70)
7	12	A. J. Allmendinger	147 (–73)
1	13	Jamie McMurray	143 (–77)
1	14	Matt Kenseth	140 (–80)
2	15	Ryan Blaney (R)	132 (–88)
	16	Chase Elliott (R)	131 (–89)
Official driver's standings

Manufacturers' Championship standings

Pos	Manufacturer	Points
1	Chevrolet	249
2	Toyota	246 (–3)
3	Ford	216 (–33)
Official manufacturers' standings

- Note: Only the first 16 positions are included for the driver standings.

Previous race: 2016 Auto Club 400	Sprint Cup Series; 2016 season	Next race: 2016 Duck Commander 500
