= 2016 Quaker State 400 =

Race details
- Race 18 of 36 in the 2016 NASCAR Sprint Cup Series
- Date: July 9, 2016
- Location: Kentucky Speedway in Sparta, Kentucky
- Course: Permanent racing facility
- Course length: 1.5 miles (2.4 km)
- Distance: 267 laps, 400.5 mi (640.8 km)
- Average speed: 128.580 mph (206.929 km/h)

Pole position
Driver	Kevin Harvick	Stewart–Haas Racing
- Time: No time trials; set by owners' points

Most laps led
Driver	Kevin Harvick	Stewart–Haas Racing
- Laps: 128

Winner
No. 2	Brad Keselowski	Team Penske

Television in the United States
- Network: NBCSN
- Announcers: Rick Allen, Jeff Burton and Steve Letarte
- Nielsen ratings: 1.8/3 (Overnight); 1.9/3 (Final); 3.2 million viewers

Radio in the United States
- Radio: PRN
- Booth announcers: Doug Rice, Mark Garrow and Wendy Venturini
- Turn announcers: Rob Albright (1 & 2) and Pat Patterson (3 & 4)

The 2016 Quaker State 400 presented by Advance Auto Parts was a NASCAR Sprint Cup Series stock car race held on July 9, 2016, at Kentucky Speedway in Sparta, Kentucky. Contested over 267 laps on the 1.5-mile (2.4 km) speedway, it was the 18th race of the 2016 NASCAR Sprint Cup Series.

The race had 16 lead changes among 9 different drivers and eleven cautions for 53 laps.

== Report ==
=== Aero package ===
During Coca-Cola 600 race weekend, NASCAR announced they would test changes to the aero package at Michigan and Kentucky. In addition to the aero changes used in the 2016 NASCAR Sprint All-Star Race, there will be a reduction in spoiler size from 3.5 inches (8.9 cm) to 2.5 inches (6.4 cm), a two-inch (5.1 cm) reduction of the splitter and resizing the deck fin.

NASCAR Executive Vice-President and Chief Racing Development Officer Steve O'Donnell said that NASCAR looks "at it as a never-ending journey; if we can improve we're going to do that. We wanted to go the direction of low downforce, see how that worked, not kind of go all the way in and hope that we are directionally right. And we are seeing that play out. We've seen some great racing at the beginning of the year. But we also knew that we had some more levers that we could pull if the direction kind of proved out, so we've tried some of those things. We've tested it and what we've also wanted to do is lower some of the corner speeds to allow for even more passing. That was one of the areas where we've seen minimal change, but there are some levers we can pull to really drive that down."

=== Track changes ===
The track was completely repaved during the first half of the Sprint Cup Series season, turns 1 and 2 were narrowed from 76 ft (23 m) to 56 ft (17 m) and the banking was raised from 14 to 17 degrees.

=== Entry list ===
The preliminary entry list for the race included forty cars and was released on July 1, 2016, at 3:17 pm ET.

No.	Driver	Team	Manufacturer
1	Jamie McMurray	Chip Ganassi Racing	Chevrolet
2	Brad Keselowski	Team Penske	Ford
3	Austin Dillon	Richard Childress Racing	Chevrolet
4	Kevin Harvick	Stewart–Haas Racing	Chevrolet
5	Kasey Kahne	Hendrick Motorsports	Chevrolet
6	Trevor Bayne	Roush Fenway Racing	Ford
7	Regan Smith	Tommy Baldwin Racing	Chevrolet
10	Danica Patrick	Stewart–Haas Racing	Chevrolet
11	Denny Hamlin	Joe Gibbs Racing	Toyota
13	Casey Mears	Germain Racing	Chevrolet
14	Tony Stewart	Stewart–Haas Racing	Chevrolet
15	Clint Bowyer	HScott Motorsports	Chevrolet
16	Greg Biffle	Roush Fenway Racing	Ford
17	Ricky Stenhouse Jr.	Roush Fenway Racing	Ford
18	Kyle Busch	Joe Gibbs Racing	Toyota
19	Carl Edwards	Joe Gibbs Racing	Toyota
20	Matt Kenseth	Joe Gibbs Racing	Toyota
21	Ryan Blaney (R)	Wood Brothers Racing	Ford
22	Joey Logano	Team Penske	Ford
23	David Ragan	BK Racing	Toyota
24	Chase Elliott (R)	Hendrick Motorsports	Chevrolet
27	Paul Menard	Richard Childress Racing	Chevrolet
30	Josh Wise	The Motorsports Group	Chevrolet
31	Ryan Newman	Richard Childress Racing	Chevrolet
32	Jeffrey Earnhardt (R)	Go FAS Racing	Ford
34	Chris Buescher (R)	Front Row Motorsports	Ford
38	Landon Cassill	Front Row Motorsports	Ford
41	Kurt Busch	Stewart–Haas Racing	Chevrolet
42	Kyle Larson	Chip Ganassi Racing	Chevrolet
43	Aric Almirola	Richard Petty Motorsports	Ford
44	Brian Scott (R)	Richard Petty Motorsports	Ford
46	Michael Annett	HScott Motorsports	Chevrolet
47	A. J. Allmendinger	JTG Daugherty Racing	Chevrolet
48	Jimmie Johnson	Hendrick Motorsports	Chevrolet
55	Reed Sorenson	Premium Motorsports	Chevrolet
78	Martin Truex Jr.	Furniture Row Racing	Toyota
83	Matt DiBenedetto	BK Racing	Toyota
88	Dale Earnhardt Jr.	Hendrick Motorsports	Chevrolet
95	Ty Dillon (i)	Circle Sport – Leavine Family Racing	Chevrolet
98	Cole Whitt	Premium Motorsports	Chevrolet
Official entry list

== Practice ==
=== First practice ===
Carl Edwards was the fastest in the first practice session with a time of 28.962 and a speed of 186.451 mph (300.064 km/h).

Pos	No.	Driver	Team	Manufacturer	Time	Speed
1	19	Carl Edwards	Joe Gibbs Racing	Toyota	28.962	186.451
2	18	Kyle Busch	Joe Gibbs Racing	Toyota	29.004	186.181
3	78	Martin Truex Jr.	Furniture Row Racing	Toyota	29.155	185.217
Official first practice results

=== Second practice ===
Denny Hamlin was the fastest in the second practice session with a time of 28.680 and a speed of 188.285 mph (303.015 km/h). Jimmie Johnson went to his backup car after slamming the wall exiting turn 4 early in the session.

Pos	No.	Driver	Team	Manufacturer	Time	Speed
1	11	Denny Hamlin	Joe Gibbs Racing	Toyota	28.680	188.285
2	48	Jimmie Johnson	Hendrick Motorsports	Chevrolet	28.705	188.121
3	4	Kevin Harvick	Stewart–Haas Racing	Chevrolet	28.710	188.088
Official second practice results

=== Third practice ===
Carl Edwards was the fastest in third practice with a time of 28.627 and a speed of 188.633 mph (303.575 km/h).

Pos	No.	Driver	Team	Manufacturer	Time	Speed
1	19	Carl Edwards	Joe Gibbs Racing	Toyota	28.627	188.633
2	78	Martin Truex Jr.	Furniture Row Racing	Toyota	28.758	187.774
3	42	Kyle Larson	Chip Ganassi Racing	Chevrolet	28.802	187.487
Official third practice results

=== Final practice ===
Carl Edwards was the fastest in the final practice session with a time of 28.808 and a speed of 187.448 mph (301.668 km/h). Kurt Busch dropped to the rear of the field after switching to his backup car because of a wreck in the closing minutes of final practice.

Pos	No.	Driver	Team	Manufacturer	Time	Speed
1	19	Carl Edwards	Joe Gibbs Racing	Toyota	28.808	187.448
2	78	Martin Truex Jr.	Furniture Row Racing	Toyota	28.950	186.528
3	42	Kyle Larson	Chip Ganassi Racing	Chevrolet	28.972	186.387
Official final practice results

== Qualifying ==
Kevin Harvick was awarded the pole position after qualifying was rained out.

=== Starting lineup ===
Pos	No.	Driver	Team	Manufacturer
1	4	Kevin Harvick	Stewart–Haas Racing	Chevrolet
2	2	Brad Keselowski	Team Penske	Ford
3	41	Kurt Busch	Stewart–Haas Racing	Chevrolet
4	22	Joey Logano	Team Penske	Ford
5	19	Carl Edwards	Joe Gibbs Racing	Toyota
6	18	Kyle Busch	Joe Gibbs Racing	Toyota
7	78	Martin Truex Jr.	Furniture Row Racing	Toyota
8	24	Chase Elliott (R)	Hendrick Motorsports	Chevrolet
9	48	Jimmie Johnson	Hendrick Motorsports	Chevrolet
10	11	Denny Hamlin	Joe Gibbs Racing	Toyota
11	20	Matt Kenseth	Joe Gibbs Racing	Toyota
12	3	Austin Dillon	Richard Childress Racing	Chevrolet
13	88	Dale Earnhardt Jr.	Hendrick Motorsports	Chevrolet
14	31	Ryan Newman	Richard Childress Racing	Chevrolet
15	21	Ryan Blaney (R)	Wood Brothers Racing	Ford
16	1	Jamie McMurray	Chip Ganassi Racing	Chevrolet
17	6	Trevor Bayne	Roush Fenway Racing	Ford
18	5	Kasey Kahne	Hendrick Motorsports	Chevrolet
19	47	A. J. Allmendinger	JTG Daugherty Racing	Chevrolet
20	42	Kyle Larson	Chip Ganassi Racing	Chevrolet
21	17	Ricky Stenhouse Jr.	Roush Fenway Racing	Ford
22	14	Tony Stewart	Stewart–Haas Racing	Chevrolet
23	16	Greg Biffle	Roush Fenway Racing	Ford
24	27	Paul Menard	Richard Childress Racing	Chevrolet
25	15	Clint Bowyer	HScott Motorsports	Chevrolet
26	43	Aric Almirola	Richard Petty Motorsports	Ford
27	10	Danica Patrick	Stewart–Haas Racing	Chevrolet
28	13	Casey Mears	Germain Racing	Chevrolet
29	38	Landon Cassill	Front Row Motorsports	Ford
30	95	Ty Dillon (i)	Circle Sport – Leavine Family Racing	Chevrolet
31	23	David Ragan	BK Racing	Toyota
32	44	Brian Scott (R)	Richard Petty Motorsports	Ford
33	7	Regan Smith	Tommy Baldwin Racing	Chevrolet
34	34	Chris Buescher (R)	Front Row Motorsports	Ford
35	83	Matt DiBenedetto	BK Racing	Toyota
36	98	Cole Whitt	Premium Motorsports	Chevrolet
37	46	Michael Annett	HScott Motorsports	Chevrolet
38	32	Jeffrey Earnhardt (R)	Go FAS Racing	Ford
39	55	Reed Sorenson	Premium Motorsports	Chevrolet
40	30	Josh Wise	The Motorsports Group	Chevrolet
Official starting lineup

== Race ==
=== First half ===
==== Start ====
Under clear evening Kentucky skies, Kevin Harvick led the field to the green flag at 7:50. After making contact with the wall in turn 4 the prior lap, Ricky Stenhouse Jr. cut a tire, slammed the wall and brought out the first caution of the race on lap 11. He went on to finish 40th.

The race restarted on lap 15. A scheduled competition caution brought out the second caution of the race on lap 26. Kurt Busch opted not to pit and assumed the lead.

The race restarted on lap 32. The third caution of the race flew the same lap for a single-car wreck on the frontstretch. Exiting turn 4, Jimmie Johnson made contact with Ryan Blaney and sent himself spinning into the wall.

The race restarted on lap 37. Harvick passed his teammate exiting turn 2 to retake the lead on lap 38. The fourth caution of the race flew on lap 54 after Joey Logano suffered a right-front tire blowout and slammed the wall in turn 3. He said afterwards that he "got loose off of four and knocked the right-rear quarter off it and then got real loose. When you get loose you have to slow down more and you use a lot of brake to slow down. Usually, the next thing to go is the right-front tire and that happened. Unfortunately, I put us in a bad spot here. It's not where we want to be and we'll figure out next week." Brad Keselowski opted not to pit and assumed the lead.

==== Second quarter ====
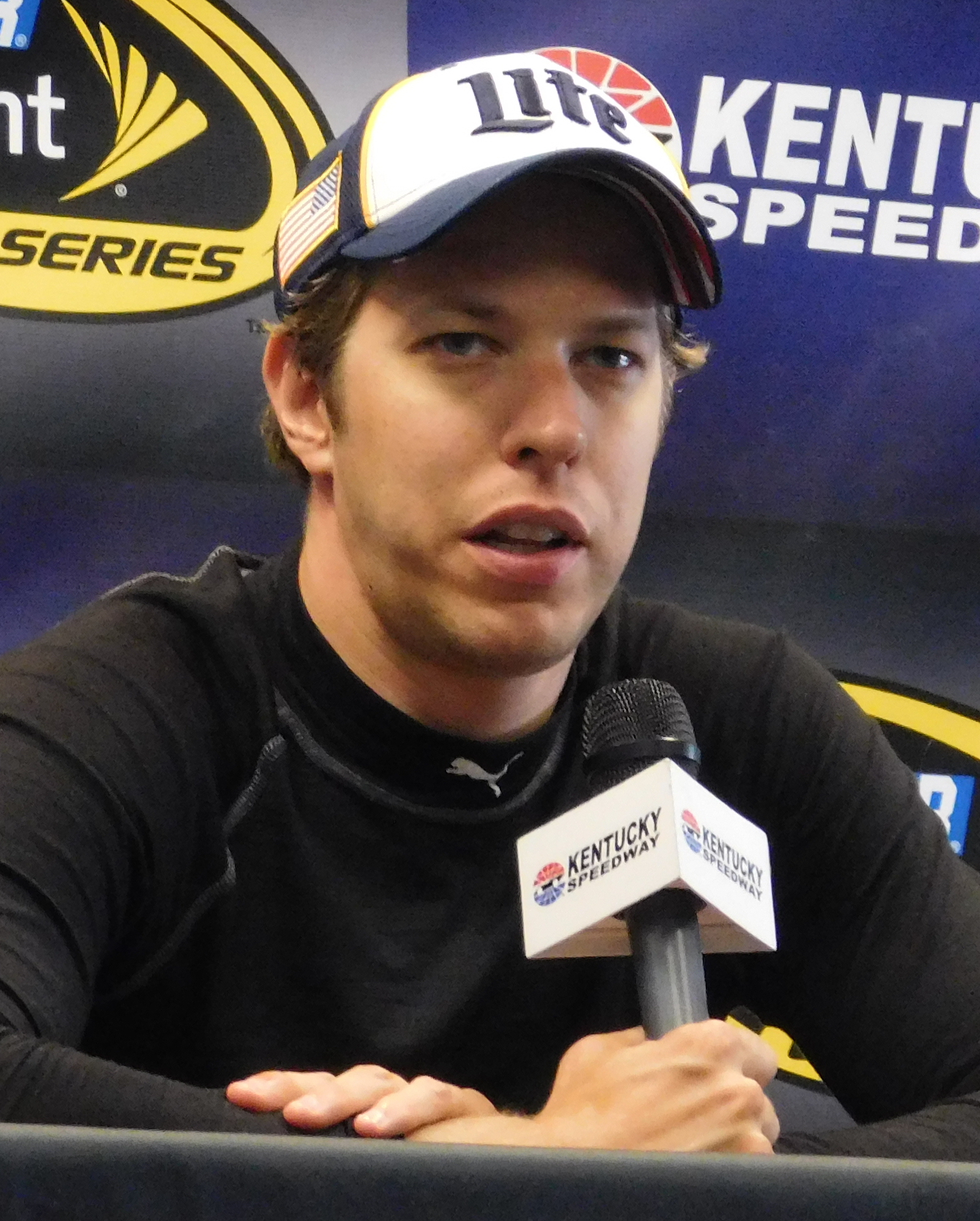
Brad Keselowski won the race.

The race restarted on lap 60. Martin Truex Jr. out-raced Keselowski to the line to take the lead on lap 63. The fifth caution of the race flew on lap 80 for Matt DiBenedetto after his car slammed the wall in turn 3. David Ragan opted not to pit and assumed the lead. He eventually pitted and handed the lead back to Harvick.

The race restarted on lap 88 and a two-car wreck in turn 3 involving Blaney and Chase Elliott brought out the sixth caution of the race. Blaney said that the "restart was pretty hectic from the beginning with the 78 getting loose and it kind of put everybody in a bad spot, and it wound up with us being in the middle of three-wide into three. It's so hard to get into that corner all night with a car close to behind you and outside of you, and no one lifting either, and it's just an unfortunate spot we got put in and I hate to see two really good cars tore up. We were both very fast tonight (24 and 21) and it's just a really unfortunate deal, but we'll try to get it fixed and get back out there and make some laps."

The race restarted on lap 92. A multi-car wreck on the backstretch brought out the seventh caution of the race on lap 94. Exiting turn 2, Brian Scott got loose, saved the car, got turned by Kyle Larson and got t-boned by Chris Buescher. A. J. Allmendinger, Buescher, Ty Dillon, Larson, Danica Patrick, Regan Smith, Scott and Cole Whitt were all collected in the melee.

The race restarted on lap 103. A number of cars began hitting pit road on lap 142. Harvick hit pit road on lap 147 and handed the lead to Austin Dillon. He pitted the next lap and handed the lead to Matt Kenseth. He pitted the next lap and handed the lead to Danica Patrick. She pitted the next lap and the lead cycled to Truex just as the eighth caution of the race flew for Regan Smith who suffered a right-front tire blowout and slammed the wall in turn 3.

=== Second half ===
==== Halfway ====
The race restarted with 110 laps to go. The ninth caution of the race flew with 108 laps to go for a single-car spin in turn 3 involving Clint Bowyer.

The race restarted with 102 laps to go. The 10th caution of the race flew with 96 laps to go for a single-car wreck on the frontstretch involving A. J. Allmendinger.

The race restarted with 91 laps to go. Harvick passed Truex in turn 3 to retake the lead with 90 laps to go. The 11th caution of the race flew with 74 laps to go after Landon Cassill slammed the wall in turn 2. Truex was forced to serve a pass-through penalty for passing Harvick on entry to pit road. He said after the race that he "did the same thing guys do every week. You get to your timing line, you step on the gas and you head straight towards your pit. So obviously I turned left and came up next to [Harvick] as I did it, as I was driving to my pit which guys do every week. I don't know why it was different today. I would think that if they didn't want us to do that any more they'd tell us in the driver meeting. But hell, it's every week. I've been passed on pit road 15 times this year the same exact way. I didn't see it get penalized. I guess when you're doing it for a win it's different circumstances or something." "Everybody does it," a visibly disappointed Truex added on pit road. "I've had people pass me the same way at Bristol and Martinsville. They'll drive right by you through the pit. Everybody does it, so I don't know why all of a sudden they're making an example out of me. It's frustrating when you don't win. I feel like I've had a lot not go the right way the last couple years, especially. It is what it is. We'll move on."

==== Fourth quarter ====
The race restarted with 68 laps to go. Keselowski took the lead with 67 laps to go. In the final 10 laps, a number of cars began pitting so to have enough fuel to make the finish. Kenseth briefly took the lead from Keselowski before he pitted with four laps to go and handed the lead back to Keselowski. Keselowski decreased his speed dramatically to conserve fuel. This allowed Carl Edwards to pull to within a car-length with one lap remaining. He blocked Edwards's advance as he re-fired his engine and drove on to score the victory.

== Post-race ==
=== Driver comments ===
Keselowski said in victory lane that he felt "terrible that I couldn't do a burnout for the fans. I didn't have enough gas," Keselowski said after going the final 71 laps on fuel. Yeah, this is our best stretch and I'm really, really proud of that. We've got to keep it going through the fall, that's really important, but this is great. I'm just so proud of my guys. I feel terrible for the fans because I didn't get to do a burnout. I didn't have any gas. The car wouldn't run, but we're back here in Victory Lane and what a great Saturday night."

After a runner-up finish, Edwards said he "thought I had him, too. He played it perfectly and he did it – he won at the absolute slowest possible speed he could. I thought he was out of fuel and that was that. I just appreciate the crowd coming out here, it's always neat to come to Kentucky. It's the site of my first win 13 years ago and it's a special place...That's a tough one to be that close. We were getting such good fuel mileage with our TRD (Toyota Racing Development) engine, I think we might have had a little extra there. That's going to be the hard part, going to bed knowing you could have gone a little faster." He added that he thought Keselowski "was out of fuel, and he wasn't. He played it perfectly. He let me get to him and then stood on it. We had a shot at it, we just weren't able to do it. Saved a little too much."

== Race results ==
Pos	No.	Driver	Team	Manufacturer	Laps	Points
1	2	Brad Keselowski	Team Penske	Ford	267	44
2	19	Carl Edwards	Joe Gibbs Racing	Toyota	267	39
3	31	Ryan Newman	Richard Childress Racing	Chevrolet	267	38
4	41	Kurt Busch	Stewart–Haas Racing	Chevrolet	267	38
5	14	Tony Stewart	Stewart–Haas Racing	Chevrolet	267	36
6	16	Greg Biffle	Roush Fenway Racing	Ford	267	35
7	1	Jamie McMurray	Chip Ganassi Racing	Chevrolet	267	34
8	20	Matt Kenseth	Joe Gibbs Racing	Toyota	267	34
9	4	Kevin Harvick	Stewart–Haas Racing	Chevrolet	267	34
10	78	Martin Truex Jr.	Furniture Row Racing	Toyota	267	32
11	6	Trevor Bayne	Roush Fenway Racing	Ford	267	30
12	18	Kyle Busch	Joe Gibbs Racing	Toyota	267	29
13	88	Dale Earnhardt Jr.	Hendrick Motorsports	Chevrolet	267	28
14	5	Kasey Kahne	Hendrick Motorsports	Chevrolet	267	27
15	11	Denny Hamlin	Joe Gibbs Racing	Toyota	267	26
16	3	Austin Dillon	Richard Childress Racing	Chevrolet	267	26
17	10	Danica Patrick	Stewart–Haas Racing	Chevrolet	266	25
18	27	Paul Menard	Richard Childress Racing	Chevrolet	266	23
19	42	Kyle Larson	Chip Ganassi Racing	Chevrolet	266	22
20	43	Aric Almirola	Richard Petty Motorsports	Ford	266	21
21	98	Cole Whitt	Premium Motorsports	Chevrolet	266	20
22	23	David Ragan	BK Racing	Toyota	265	20
23	15	Clint Bowyer	HScott Motorsports	Chevrolet	265	18
24	30	Josh Wise	The Motorsports Group	Chevrolet	264	17
25	95	Ty Dillon (i)	Circle Sport – Leavine Family Racing	Chevrolet	264	0
26	46	Michael Annett	HScott Motorsports	Chevrolet	264	15
27	55	Reed Sorenson	Premium Motorsports	Chevrolet	262	14
28	32	Jeffrey Earnhardt (R)	Go FAS Racing	Ford	262	13
29	38	Landon Cassill	Front Row Motorsports	Ford	261	12
30	13	Casey Mears	Germain Racing	Chevrolet	246	11
31	24	Chase Elliott (R)	Hendrick Motorsports	Chevrolet	210	10
32	48	Jimmie Johnson	Hendrick Motorsports	Chevrolet	208	9
33	44	Brian Scott (R)	Richard Petty Motorsports	Ford	151	8
34	7	Regan Smith	Tommy Baldwin Racing	Chevrolet	150	7
35	21	Ryan Blaney (R)	Wood Brothers Racing	Ford	143	6
36	47	A. J. Allmendinger	JTG Daugherty Racing	Chevrolet	103	5
37	34	Chris Buescher (R)	Front Row Motorsports	Ford	92	4
38	83	Matt DiBenedetto	BK Racing	Toyota	79	3
39	22	Joey Logano	Team Penske	Ford	52	2
40	17	Ricky Stenhouse Jr.	Roush Fenway Racing	Ford	9	1
Official race results

=== Race summary ===
- Lead changes: 16 among 9 drivers
- Cautions: 11 for 53 laps
- Red flags: none
- Time of race: 3 hours, 6 minutes and 55 seconds
- Average speed: 128.580 miles per hour (206.929 km/h)

== Media ==
=== Television ===
NBC Sports covered the race on the television side. Rick Allen, Jeff Burton and Steve Letarte had the call in the booth for the race. Dave Burns, Mike Massaro, Marty Snider and Kelli Stavast reported from pit lane during the race.

NBCSN
Booth announcers	Pit reporters
Lap-by-lap: Rick Allen; Color-commentator: Jeff Burton; Color-commentator: Steve Letarte	Dave Burns; Mike Massaro; Marty Snider; Kelli Stavast

=== Radio ===
PRN had the radio call for the race, which was simulcast on Sirius XM NASCAR Radio.

PRN
Booth announcers	Turn announcers	Pit reporters
Lead announcer: Doug Rice; Announcer: Mark Garrow; Announcer: Wendy Venturini	Turns 1 & 2: Rob Albright; Turns 3 & 4: Pat Patterson	Brad Gillie; Brett McMillan; Jim Noble; Steve Richards

== Standings after the race ==
Drivers' Championship standings
	Pos	Manufacturer	Points
	1	Kevin Harvick	599
	2	Brad Keselowski	595 (–4)
	3	Kurt Busch	583 (–16)
1	4	Carl Edwards	566 (–33)
1	5	Joey Logano	533 (–66)
	6	Kyle Busch	521 (–78)
	7	Martin Truex Jr.	514 (–85)
	8	Chase Elliott (R)	492 (–107)
	9	Jimmie Johnson	484 (–115)
1	10	Matt Kenseth	477 (–122)
1	11	Denny Hamlin	472 (–127)
2	12	Ryan Newman	463 (–136)
	13	Dale Earnhardt Jr.	461 (–138)
2	14	Austin Dillon	460 (–139)
1	15	Jamie McMurray	439 (–160)
1	16	Trevor Bayne	429 (–170)
Official driver's standings

Manufacturers' Championship standings
	Pos	Manufacturer	Points
1		Toyota	743
	2	Chevrolet	723 (–20)
	3	Ford	686 (–57)
Official manufacturer's standings

- Note: Only the first 16 positions are included for the driver standings.
  . – Driver has clinched a position in the Chase for the Sprint Cup.

Previous race: 2016 Coke Zero 400	Sprint Cup Series; 2016 season	Next race: 2016 New Hampshire 301
