= 2016 Coke Zero 400 =

Motor car race in Daytona Beach, Florida, US

2016 Coke Zero 400 powered by Coca-Cola
Race details
- Race 17 of 36 in the 2016 NASCAR Sprint Cup Series
- The 2016 Coke Zero 400 program cover, featuring Tony Stewart's victories at Daytona.
- Date: July 2, 2016
- Location: Daytona International Speedway in Daytona Beach, Florida
- Course: Permanent racing facility
- Course length: 2.5 miles (4.023 km)
- Distance: 161 laps, 402.5 mi (647.761 km)
- Scheduled distance: 160 laps, 400 mi (643.738 km)
- Average speed: 150.342 mph (241.952 km/h)

Pole position
| Driver | Greg Biffle | Roush Fenway Racing |
- Time: 46.643

Most laps led
| Driver | Brad Keselowski | Team Penske |
- Laps: 115

Winner
| No. 2 | Brad Keselowski | Team Penske |

Television in the United States
- Network: NBC
- Announcers: Rick Allen, Jeff Burton and Steve Letarte
- Nielsen ratings: 3.4; 5.7 million viewers

Radio in the United States
- Radio: MRN
- Booth announcers: Joe Moore, Jeff Striegle and Rusty Wallace
- Turn announcers: Dave Moody (1 & 2), Mike Bagley (Backstretch) and Kyle Rickey (3 & 4)

The 2016 Coke Zero 400 powered by Cola-Cola was a NASCAR Sprint Cup Series race that was held on July 2, 2016 at Daytona International Speedway in Daytona Beach, Florida. Contested over 161 laps - extended from 160 laps due to overtime, on the 2.5-mile (4.0-kilometre) superspeedway, it was the 17th race of the 2016 NASCAR Sprint Cup Series season.

The race had 26 lead changes among different drivers and five cautions for 28 laps.

== Report ==
=== Entry list ===
The preliminary entry list for the race included forty-one cars and was released on June 3, 2016 at 2:31 pm ET.

| No. | Driver | Team | Manufacturer |
|---|---|---|---|
| 1 | Jamie McMurray | Chip Ganassi Racing | Chevrolet |
| 2 | Brad Keselowski | Team Penske | Ford |
| 3 | Austin Dillon | Richard Childress Racing | Chevrolet |
| 4 | Kevin Harvick | Stewart–Haas Racing | Chevrolet |
| 5 | Kasey Kahne | Hendrick Motorsports | Chevrolet |
| 6 | Trevor Bayne | Roush Fenway Racing | Ford |
| 7 | Regan Smith | Tommy Baldwin Racing | Chevrolet |
| 10 | Danica Patrick | Stewart–Haas Racing | Chevrolet |
| 11 | Denny Hamlin | Joe Gibbs Racing | Toyota |
| 13 | Casey Mears | Germain Racing | Chevrolet |
| 14 | Tony Stewart | Stewart–Haas Racing | Chevrolet |
| 15 | Clint Bowyer | HScott Motorsports | Chevrolet |
| 16 | Greg Biffle | Roush Fenway Racing | Ford |
| 17 | Ricky Stenhouse Jr. | Roush Fenway Racing | Ford |
| 18 | Kyle Busch | Joe Gibbs Racing | Toyota |
| 19 | Carl Edwards | Joe Gibbs Racing | Toyota |
| 20 | Matt Kenseth | Joe Gibbs Racing | Toyota |
| 21 | Ryan Blaney (R) | Wood Brothers Racing | Ford |
| 22 | Joey Logano | Team Penske | Ford |
| 23 | David Ragan | BK Racing | Toyota |
| 24 | Chase Elliott (R) | Hendrick Motorsports | Chevrolet |
| 27 | Paul Menard | Richard Childress Racing | Chevrolet |
| 30 | Josh Wise | The Motorsports Group | Chevrolet |
| 31 | Ryan Newman | Richard Childress Racing | Chevrolet |
| 32 | Bobby Labonte | Go FAS Racing | Ford |
| 34 | Chris Buescher (R) | Front Row Motorsports | Ford |
| 35 | David Gilliland | Front Row Motorsports | Ford |
| 38 | Landon Cassill | Front Row Motorsports | Ford |
| 41 | Kurt Busch | Stewart–Haas Racing | Chevrolet |
| 42 | Kyle Larson | Chip Ganassi Racing | Chevrolet |
| 43 | Aric Almirola | Richard Petty Motorsports | Ford |
| 44 | Brian Scott (R) | Richard Petty Motorsports | Ford |
| 46 | Michael Annett | HScott Motorsports | Chevrolet |
| 47 | A. J. Allmendinger | JTG Daugherty Racing | Chevrolet |
| 48 | Jimmie Johnson | Hendrick Motorsports | Chevrolet |
| 55 | Reed Sorenson | Premium Motorsports | Chevrolet |
| 78 | Martin Truex Jr. | Furniture Row Racing | Toyota |
| 83 | Matt DiBenedetto | BK Racing | Toyota |
| 88 | Dale Earnhardt Jr. | Hendrick Motorsports | Chevrolet |
| 95 | Michael McDowell | Circle Sport – Leavine Family Racing | Chevrolet |
| 98 | Cole Whitt | Premium Motorsports | Toyota |
Official entry list

== Practice ==
Brian Scott was the fastest in the final practice session with a time of 45.147 and a speed of 199.349 mph (320.821 km/h). With nine minutes remaining in the session, Kyle Busch suffered a cut in his right-rear tire, got loose, turned up the track and slammed the wall head-on in turn 1. After being released from the infield care center, he said the crash "was a huge impact. I thank NASCAR for all their advancements in the safety aspects of the car in the things that drivers wear and the SAFER Barriers as well today. That could have been a heck of a lot uglier than what it was. I'm pretty confident in Joe Gibbs Racing and their ability to build good race cars. I'm not very confident in Goodyear in giving us good tires to go out there and race on." He later clarified his statement on Goodyear saying from his "vantage point, we’ve had a lot of tire issues this year. That’s probably, I don’t know, four or five or six tires that we’ve blown this year. That’s what the most frustrating part is. We also did the tire test at Kentucky and didn’t necessarily have the best of results I felt like from my vantage point with what we’ve got to do for next week. That’s where the frustration probably stemmed from and came from. Goodyear probably didn’t deserve what they got from me earlier today.’’ The damage forced him to switch to his backup car.

| Pos | No. | Driver | Team | Manufacturer | Time | Speed |
|---|---|---|---|---|---|---|
| 1 | 44 | Brian Scott (R) | Richard Petty Motorsports | Ford | 45.147 | 199.349 |
| 2 | 3 | Austin Dillon | Richard Childress Racing | Chevrolet | 45.148 | 199.344 |
| 3 | 2 | Brad Keselowski | Team Penske | Ford | 45.292 | 198.711 |
Official final practice results

== Qualifying ==
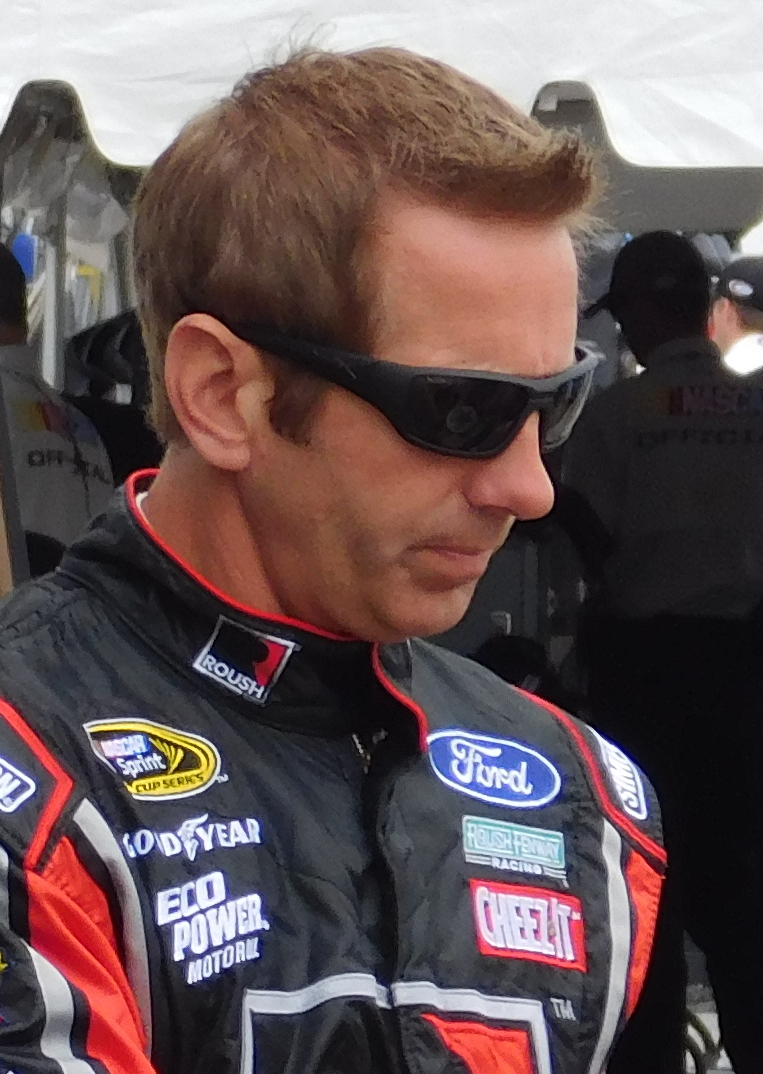
Greg Biffle scored the pole position.

Greg Biffle scored the pole for the race with a time of 46.643 and a speed of 192.955 mph (310.531 km/h). He said the pole "feels good for our team. Not only did we win the pole but the car is in race trim right now, so it shows you how fast it’ll be Saturday night and that's one thing we're really happy about." He added that his team has "been working really, really hard. Just really excited for the whole team. I'm just happy to be driving it.”

Carl Edwards, who qualified second, said he's "got a fast race car" and that he's "happy for Greg and the Roush group though. It's good to see them succeed and congratulations on the pole." He added that he "would have loved to be on the pole, but starting up front will be great and hopefully we can stay up front. I need to get a win in that column, we have a big zero there from my career here at Daytona so I would like to get a win.”

=== Qualifying results ===
| Pos | No. | Driver | Team | Manufacturer | R1 | R2 |
|---|---|---|---|---|---|---|
| 1 | 16 | Greg Biffle | Roush Fenway Racing | Ford | 46.722 | 46.643 |
| 2 | 19 | Carl Edwards | Joe Gibbs Racing | Toyota | 46.855 | 46.693 |
| 3 | 18 | Kyle Busch | Joe Gibbs Racing | Toyota | 46.988 | 46.793 |
| 4 | 17 | Ricky Stenhouse Jr. | Roush Fenway Racing | Ford | 46.909 | 46.797 |
| 5 | 2 | Brad Keselowski | Team Penske | Ford | 46.773 | 46.813 |
| 6 | 3 | Austin Dillon | Richard Childress Racing | Chevrolet | 46.851 | 46.813 |
| 7 | 20 | Matt Kenseth | Joe Gibbs Racing | Toyota | 46.860 | 46.818 |
| 8 | 48 | Jimmie Johnson | Hendrick Motorsports | Chevrolet | 47.014 | 46.836 |
| 9 | 11 | Denny Hamlin | Joe Gibbs Racing | Toyota | 47.045 | 46.881 |
| 10 | 41 | Kurt Busch | Stewart–Haas Racing | Chevrolet | 47.043 | 46.908 |
| 11 | 22 | Joey Logano | Team Penske | Ford | 46.876 | 47.022 |
| 12 | 21 | Ryan Blaney (R) | Wood Brothers Racing | Ford | 47.019 | 47.058 |
| 13 | 6 | Trevor Bayne | Roush Fenway Racing | Ford | 47.073 | |
| 14 | 43 | Aric Almirola | Richard Petty Motorsports | Ford | 47.092 | |
| 15 | 78 | Martin Truex Jr. | Furniture Row Racing | Toyota | 47.095 | |
| 16 | 88 | Dale Earnhardt Jr. | Hendrick Motorsports | Chevrolet | 47.103 | |
| 17 | 42 | Kyle Larson | Chip Ganassi Racing | Chevrolet | 47.137 | |
| 18 | 5 | Kasey Kahne | Hendrick Motorsports | Chevrolet | 47.174 | |
| 19 | 14 | Tony Stewart | Stewart–Haas Racing | Chevrolet | 47.202 | |
| 20 | 13 | Casey Mears | Germain Racing | Chevrolet | 47.250 | |
| 21 | 4 | Kevin Harvick | Stewart–Haas Racing | Chevrolet | 47.258 | |
| 22 | 10 | Danica Patrick | Stewart–Haas Racing | Chevrolet | 47.259 | |
| 23 | 31 | Ryan Newman | Richard Childress Racing | Chevrolet | 47.275 | |
| 24 | 24 | Chase Elliott (R) | Hendrick Motorsports | Chevrolet | 47.279 | |
| 25 | 34 | Chris Buescher (R) | Front Row Motorsports | Ford | 47.300 | |
| 26 | 47 | A. J. Allmendinger | JTG Daugherty Racing | Chevrolet | 47.399 | |
| 27 | 27 | Paul Menard | Richard Childress Racing | Chevrolet | 47.445 | |
| 28 | 35 | David Gilliland | Front Row Motorsports | Ford | 47.501 | |
| 29 | 1 | Jamie McMurray | Chip Ganassi Racing | Chevrolet | 47.566 | |
| 30 | 44 | Brian Scott (R) | Richard Petty Motorsports | Ford | 47.628 | |
| 31 | 15 | Clint Bowyer | HScott Motorsports | Chevrolet | 47.688 | |
| 32 | 32 | Bobby Labonte | Go FAS Racing | Ford | 47.773 | |
| 33 | 46 | Michael Annett | HScott Motorsports | Chevrolet | 47.785 | |
| 34 | 38 | Landon Cassill | Front Row Motorsports | Ford | 47.809 | |
| 35 | 98 | Cole Whitt | Premium Motorsports | Toyota | 47.967 | |
| 36 | 83 | Matt DiBenedetto | BK Racing | Toyota | 47.984 | |
| 37 | 95 | Michael McDowell | Circle Sport – Leavine Family Racing | Chevrolet | 48.005 | |
| 38 | 23 | David Ragan | BK Racing | Toyota | 48.019 | |
| 39 | 55 | Reed Sorenson | Premium Motorsports | Chevrolet | 48.122 | |
| 40 | 7 | Regan Smith | Tommy Baldwin Racing | Chevrolet | 0.000 | |
Did not qualify
| 41 | 30 | Josh Wise | The Motorsports Group | Chevrolet | 48.885 | |
Official qualifying results

== Race ==
=== First half ===
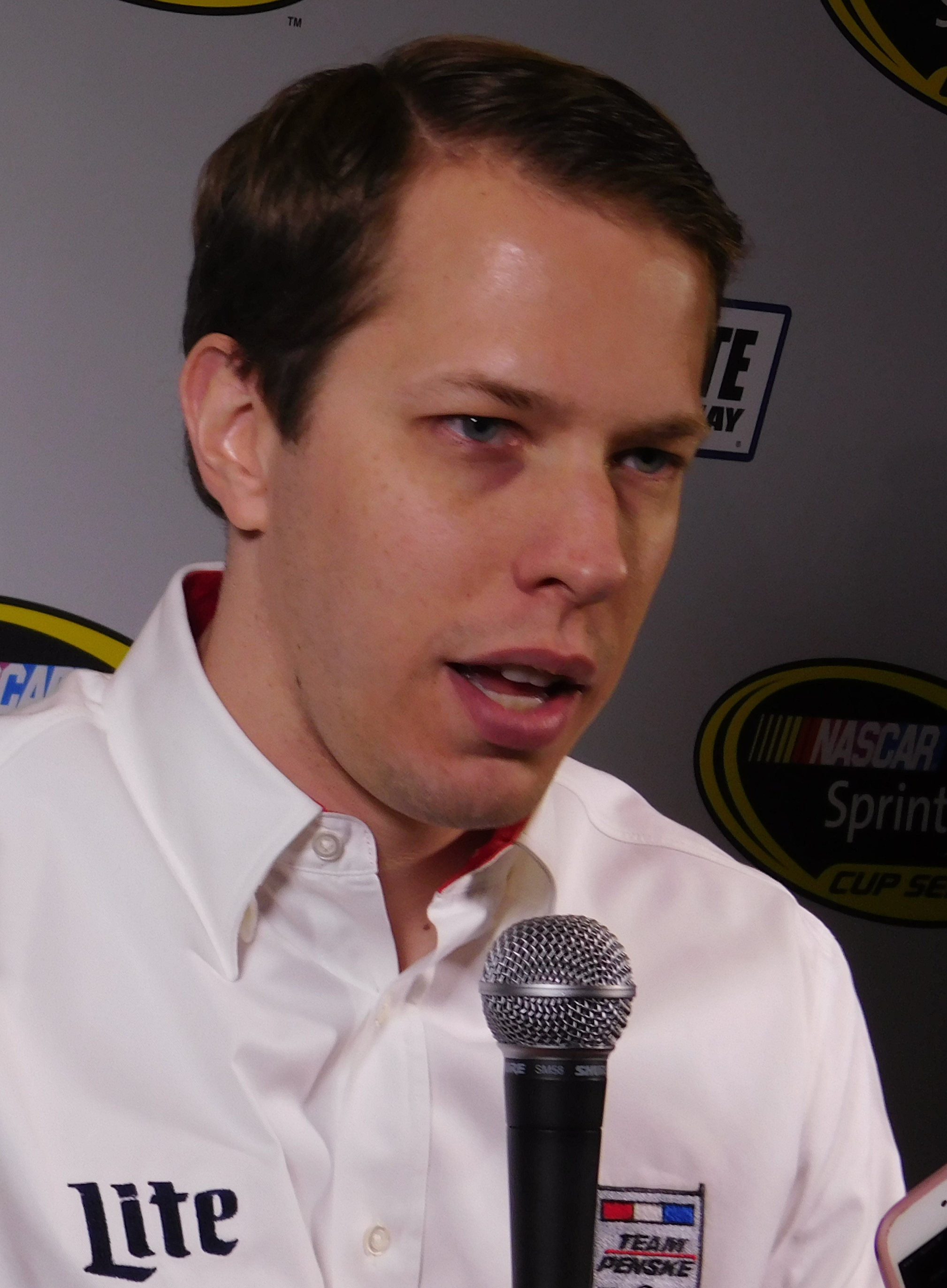
Brad Keselowski won the race.

Under clear Florida evening skies, Greg Biffle led the field to the green flag at 8:14. The honor of leading the first lap, however, went to Carl Edwards. Brad Keselowski passed Edwards on the outside line to take the lead on the ninth lap. Riding along, the field raced two and three wide through the entire pack. The first caution of the race flew on lap 21 for a stalled car on the frontstretch. The car was the No. 38 of Landon Cassill and he was reporting engine failure. Because this came out the same lap as a scheduled competition caution, the teams were allowed to refuel. David Ragan opted to stay out when the leaders pitted and assumed the lead. He pitted the next time through and Keselowski cycled back to the lead. Jimmie Johnson was tagged for too many crew members over the wall and Casey Mears was tagged for his crew being over the wall too soon. Both restarted the race from the tail end of the field.

The race restarted on lap 26. Biffle drag-raced Keselowski to the start/finish line to take the lead on lap 30. Keselowski took it back on lap 31. The field settled into a single-file train running the high side of the track. That only lasted a few laps, however, as the bottom line – led by Joey Logano – began to close in on Keselowski. A number of cars, including race leader Keselowski, began pitting on lap 65. This handed the lead to Denny Hamlin, who pitted the next lap and handed the lead to Mears. He pitted on lap 68 and Kevin Harvick assumed the lead. He pitted the next lap and handed the lead to Clint Bowyer. He pitted the next lap and the lead cycled to Kyle Busch. Danica Patrick was tagged for driving through too many pit boxes on pit road and was forced to serve a pass through penalty.

=== Second half ===
Denny Hamlin passed teammate Busch on the top and took the lead on lap 77. Keselowski passed to his outside to take back the lead on lap 83. The second caution of the race flew on lap 90 for a multi-car wreck in turn 1. It started when Jamie McMurray bounced off Kyle Larson, got hooked into the wall by Johnson and collected up to 22 cars. McMurray said he didn't "know what happened. I think somebody got into my left rear, and I don't know if I cut a tire down. After I felt that happen, I just didn't have any control. ... It's unfortunate. It's part of [restrictor] plate racing." Johnson said that there was "light contact" and that "the momentum carried me into the back of [McMurray] and turned him sideways. It was a matter of inches, and once it started, it collected everybody." "Just a bunch of cars crashing -- pretty much that was it," said Matt Kenseth. "I was just trying to make my way back toward the front a little bit there. We had a bad pit-stop exchange and came out way, way behind everybody. Carl was up toward the front and we were running with him before the pit stop. I probably should have just hung in the back, hindsight, but who knows when they're going to wreck, you never know if they're going to wreck. Just trying to get back toward the front and there was a wreck somewhere a few rows up in front of me and just nowhere really to go." Michael Annett, Biffle, Bowyer, Chris Buescher, Matt DiBenedetto, Dale Earnhardt Jr., Chase Elliott, David Gilliland, Harvick, Johnson, Kasey Kahne, Kenseth, Larson, McMurray, Paul Menard, Ryan Newman, Patrick, Ragan, Regan Smith, Martin Truex Jr. and Ryan Blaney all were involved. Buescher would go on to finish 40th. Logano exited pit road first.

The race restarted on lap 102. A power move to the outside by Keselowski got him by his teammate for the lead at lap 106. Debris brought out the third caution of the race with 30 laps to go. Busch exited pit road first.

The race restarted with 26 laps to go. After racing side-by-side for five laps, Keselowski powered by him on the outside on the backstretch to take back the lead with 21 laps to go. Busch drove underneath him exiting turn 4 to retake the lead with 19 laps to go. Keselowski drove underneath him in turn 2 to retake the lead with 16 laps to go. The fourth caution of the race flew with 12 laps to go for a single-car wreck in turn 1 involving Tony Stewart. “Casey Mears was watching and gave me plenty of room to get up there,” Stewart said. “So I figured it was better if I got to the top. Then three or four laps later I got loose into (Turn) 1, so I hadn't been loose all day there. When I did, I over-corrected and got into the fence.”

The race restarted with six laps to go. The fifth caution of the race flew with five laps to go after Edwards was turned into the wall by Ryan Blaney and collected Bobby Labonte.

The race restarted with two laps to go. Keselowski held off the Busch brothers and teammate Logano to score the victory just as Kurt Busch got turned into the tri-oval grass by Logano. It was the 100th Sprint Cup Series win for Team Penske.

== Post-race ==
=== Driver comments ===
Keselowski said in victory lane his "guys were doing a heck of a job; Kyle and Kurt (Busch) worked together really well. My teammate, Joey Logano, was a huge part of this. Joey has won here and he's really a pro -- especially on that restart -- and he gave me the push I needed to get to the front. Here we are, it's Daytona in victory lane. I don't care if it's the 500, it's Daytona, and this is huge. I love this place."

Kyle Busch, who drove his backup car to a runner-up finish, said this race "was really close to Talladega. We finished second at Talladega. Just there at the end of the race, the 2 car was really, really fast. Really, really strong. It's really hard to get by him. I tried just about everything. The only thing I didn't quite have was a big enough push one time to just try to make a move. He was really good at making that thing pretty wide.”

"To have a top-three finish today, it's really a great day for us and a great day for Roush Fenway Racing and Ford," Bayne said after finishing third. "For our organization to be on the pole this weekend, to have three cars in the top eight, two in the top-five, I think that's kind of a landmark for us as an organization with the struggles we've had to get all three teams running strong on a weekend like this."

Logano, who finished fourth, said of his last lap incident with Kurt Busch that he hated "that I got into Kurt there at the end racing to the line. I had a run to turn up underneath him, and when you do that, the cars get free and then I was there and he tried to catch it and I was there again. It is a product of this racing, but I hate that it happened." Busch said after the race that he thought "that he (Logano) made an aggressive mistake; you can't go from fifth to first," Busch said. "There's just no shot at it. It's a shame that we ended up spun around and wrecked. We could have come out of here with the points lead."

== Race results ==
| Pos | No. | Driver | Team | Manufacturer | Laps | Pts. |
|---|---|---|---|---|---|---|
| 1 | 2 | Brad Keselowski | Team Penske | Ford | 161 | 45 |
| 2 | 18 | Kyle Busch | Joe Gibbs Racing | Toyota | 161 | 40 |
| 3 | 6 | Trevor Bayne | Roush Fenway Racing | Ford | 161 | 38 |
| 4 | 22 | Joey Logano | Team Penske | Ford | 161 | 38 |
| 5 | 17 | Ricky Stenhouse Jr. | Roush Fenway Racing | Ford | 161 | 36 |
| 6 | 42 | Kyle Larson | Chip Ganassi Racing | Chevrolet | 161 | 35 |
| 7 | 3 | Austin Dillon | Richard Childress Racing | Chevrolet | 161 | 34 |
| 8 | 16 | Greg Biffle | Roush Fenway Racing | Ford | 161 | 34 |
| 9 | 15 | Clint Bowyer | HScott Motorsports | Chevrolet | 161 | 33 |
| 10 | 95 | Michael McDowell | Circle Sport – Leavine Family Racing | Chevrolet | 161 | 31 |
| 11 | 98 | Cole Whitt | Premium Motorsports | Toyota | 161 | 30 |
| 12 | 13 | Casey Mears | Germain Racing | Chevrolet | 161 | 30 |
| 13 | 47 | A. J. Allmendinger | JTG Daugherty Racing | Chevrolet | 161 | 28 |
| 14 | 21 | Ryan Blaney (R) | Wood Brothers Racing | Ford | 161 | 27 |
| 15 | 43 | Aric Almirola | Richard Petty Motorsports | Ford | 161 | 26 |
| 16 | 23 | David Ragan | BK Racing | Toyota | 161 | 26 |
| 17 | 11 | Denny Hamlin | Joe Gibbs Racing | Toyota | 161 | 25 |
| 18 | 31 | Ryan Newman | Richard Childress Racing | Chevrolet | 161 | 23 |
| 19 | 35 | David Gilliland | Front Row Motorsports | Ford | 161 | 22 |
| 20 | 46 | Michael Annett | HScott Motorsports | Chevrolet | 161 | 21 |
| 21 | 88 | Dale Earnhardt Jr. | Hendrick Motorsports | Chevrolet | 161 | 20 |
| 22 | 55 | Reed Sorenson | Premium Motorsports | Chevrolet | 161 | 19 |
| 23 | 41 | Kurt Busch | Stewart–Haas Racing | Chevrolet | 161 | 18 |
| 24 | 32 | Bobby Labonte | Go FAS Racing | Ford | 160 | 17 |
| 25 | 19 | Carl Edwards | Joe Gibbs Racing | Toyota | 155 | 17 |
| 26 | 14 | Tony Stewart | Stewart–Haas Racing | Chevrolet | 148 | 16 |
| 27 | 10 | Danica Patrick | Stewart–Haas Racing | Chevrolet | 130 | 14 |
| 28 | 20 | Matt Kenseth | Joe Gibbs Racing | Toyota | 127 | 13 |
| 29 | 78 | Martin Truex Jr. | Furniture Row Racing | Toyota | 127 | 13 |
| 30 | 5 | Kasey Kahne | Hendrick Motorsports | Chevrolet | 122 | 11 |
| 31 | 38 | Landon Cassill | Front Row Motorsports | Ford | 119 | 10 |
| 32 | 24 | Chase Elliott (R) | Hendrick Motorsports | Chevrolet | 113 | 9 |
| 33 | 83 | Matt DiBenedetto | BK Racing | Toyota | 108 | 8 |
| 34 | 1 | Jamie McMurray | Chip Ganassi Racing | Chevrolet | 91 | 7 |
| 35 | 48 | Jimmie Johnson | Hendrick Motorsports | Chevrolet | 89 | 6 |
| 36 | 27 | Paul Menard | Richard Childress Racing | Chevrolet | 89 | 5 |
| 37 | 44 | Brian Scott (R) | Richard Petty Motorsports | Ford | 89 | 4 |
| 38 | 7 | Regan Smith | Tommy Baldwin Racing | Chevrolet | 89 | 4 |
| 39 | 4 | Kevin Harvick | Stewart–Haas Racing | Chevrolet | 89 | 3 |
| 40 | 34 | Chris Buescher (R) | Front Row Motorsports | Ford | 89 | 1 |
Official race results

=== Race summary ===
- Lead changes: 26 among different drivers
- Cautions/Laps: 5 for 28
- Red flags: 0
- Time of race: 2 hours, 40 minutes and 38 seconds
- Average speed: 150.342 miles per hour (241.952 km/h)

== Media ==
=== Television ===
NBC Sports covered the race on the television side. Rick Allen, Jeff Burton and Steve Letarte had the call in the booth for the race. Dave Burns, Mike Massaro, Marty Snider and Kelli Stavast reported from pit lane during the race.

NBC
| Booth announcers | Pit reporters |
|---|---|
| Lap-by-lap: Rick Allen; Color-commentator: Jeff Burton; Color-commentator: Steve Letarte | Dave Burns; Mike Massaro; Marty Snider; Kelli Stavast |

=== Radio ===
MRN had the radio call for the race which was also simulcasted on Sirius XM NASCAR Radio.

MRN Radio
| Booth announcers | Turn announcers | Pit reporters |
|---|---|---|
| Lead announcer: Joe Moore; Announcer: Jeff Striegle; Announcer: Rusty Wallace | Turns 1 & 2: Dave Moody; Backstretch: Mike Bagley; Turns 3 & 4: Kyle Rickey | Alex Hayden; Winston Kelley; Steve Post; Kim Coon |

== Standings after the race ==
Drivers' Championship standings
| | Pos | Manufacturer | Points |
|---|---|---|---|
| | 1 | Kevin Harvick | 565 |
| 2 | 2 | Brad Keselowski | 551 (–14) |
| 1 | 3 | Kurt Busch | 545 (–20) |
| 1 | 4 | Joey Logano | 531 (–34) |
| 2 | 5 | Carl Edwards | 527 (–38) |
| 3 | 6 | Kyle Busch | 492 (–73) |
| 1 | 7 | Martin Truex Jr. | 482 (–83) |
| 2 | 8 | Chase Elliott (R) | 482 (–83) |
| 2 | 9 | Jimmie Johnson | 475 (–90) |
| 1 | 10 | Denny Hamlin | 446 (–119) |
| 1 | 11 | Matt Kenseth | 443 (–122) |
| 2 | 12 | Austin Dillon | 434 (–131) |
| 1 | 13 | Dale Earnhardt Jr. | 433 (–132) |
| 1 | 14 | Ryan Newman | 425 (–140) |
| 2 | 15 | Ryan Blaney (R) | 409 (–156) |
| 1 | 16 | Jamie McMurray | 405 (–160) |
Official drivers' classification

Manufacturers' Championship standings
| Pos | Manufacturer | Points |
|---|---|---|
| 1 | Toyota | 704 |
| 2 | Chevrolet | 685 (–19) |
| 3 | Ford | 642 (–62) |
Official manufacturers' classification

- Note: Only the top sixteen positions are included for the driver standings. These drivers are eligible for the Chase for the Sprint Cup.
  . – Driver has clinched a position in the Chase for the Sprint Cup.

| Previous race: 2016 Toyota/Save Mart 350 | Sprint Cup Series; 2016 season | Next race: 2016 Quaker State 400 |
