= 2017 Monster Energy NASCAR Cup Series =

American motorsport season

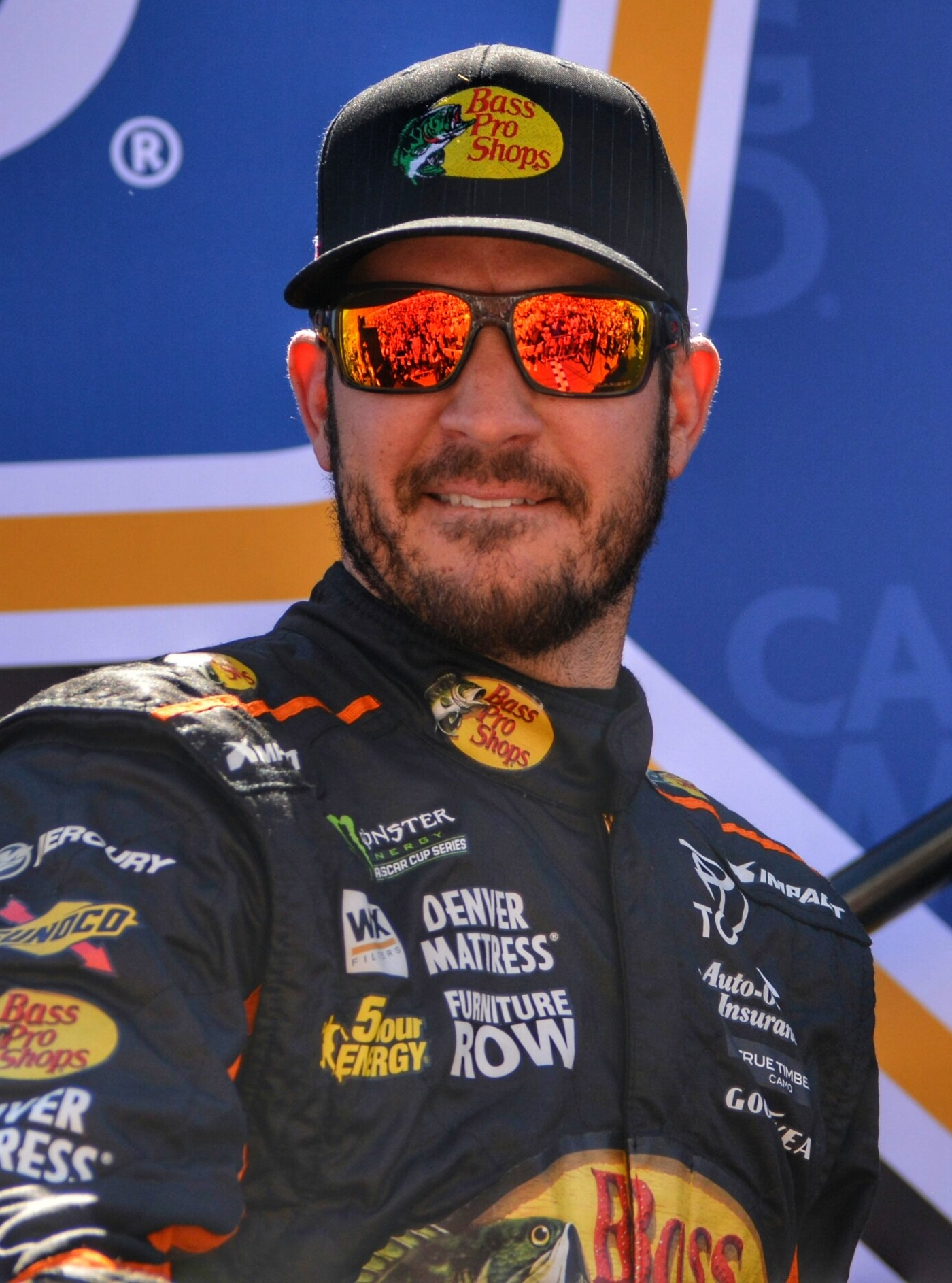
Martin Truex Jr., the 2017 Monster Energy NASCAR Cup Series champion and 2017 regular season champion

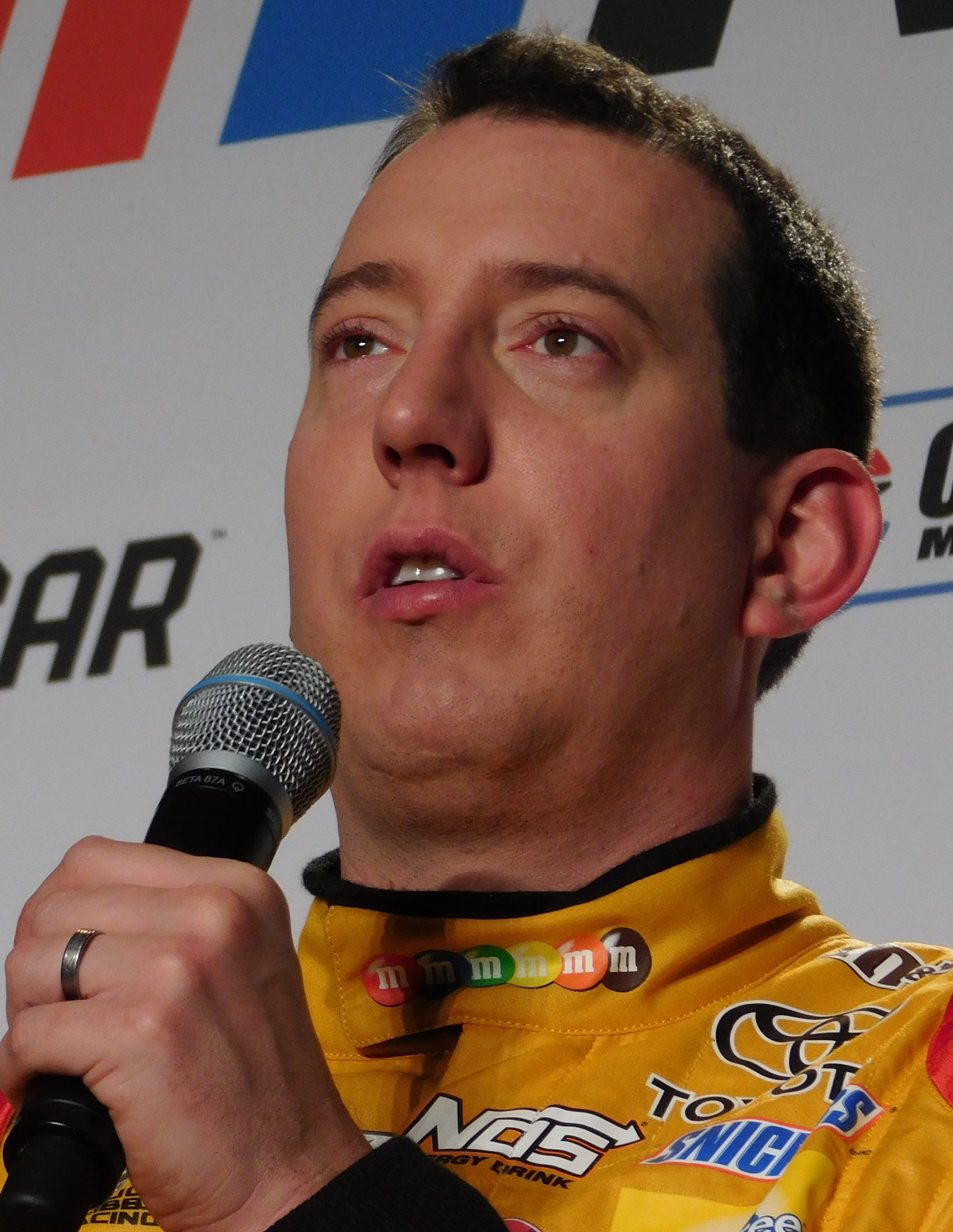
Kyle Busch finished 5 points behind Martin Truex Jr., in second place.

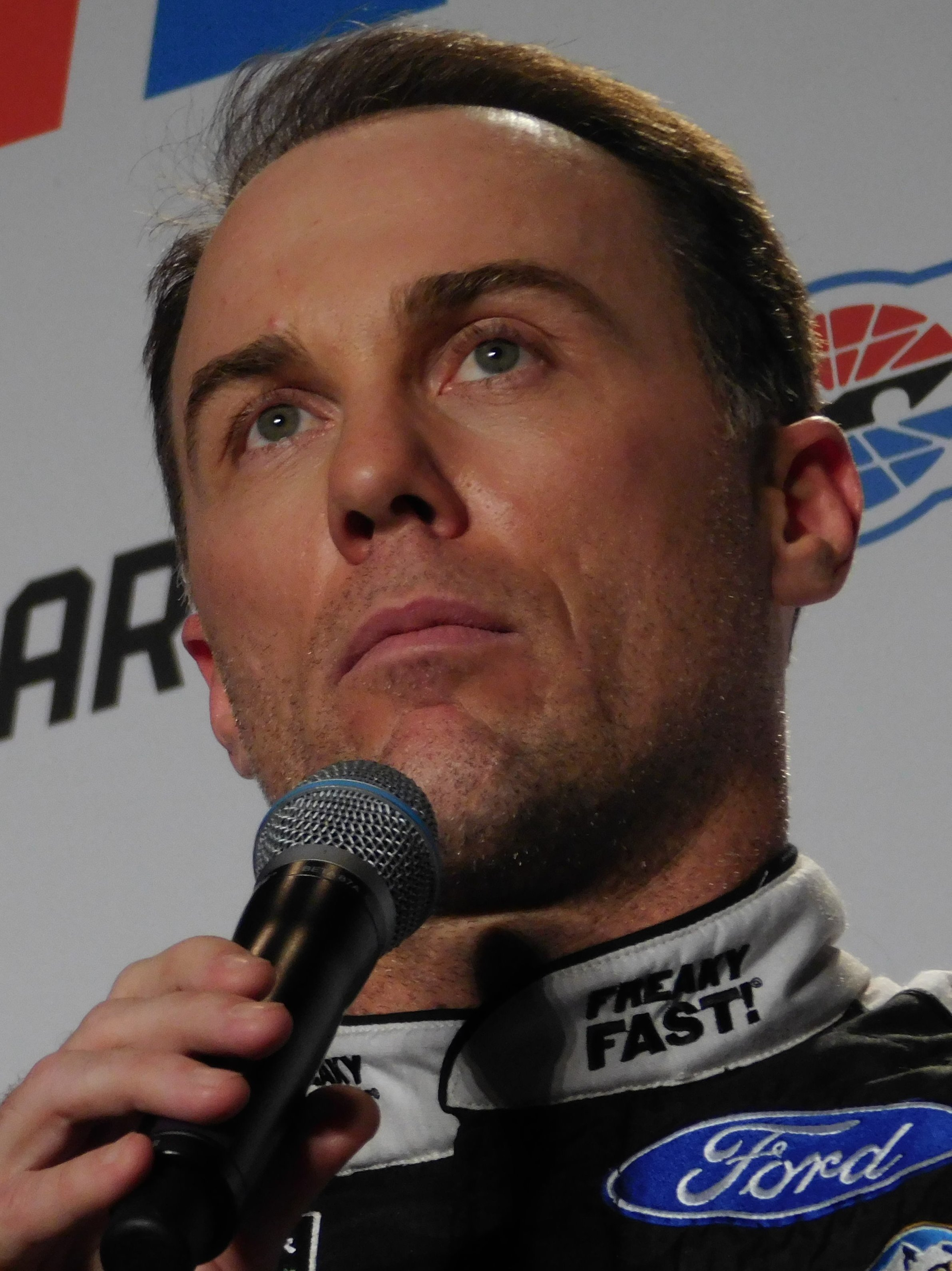
Kevin Harvick finished 7 points behind Martin Truex Jr., in third place.

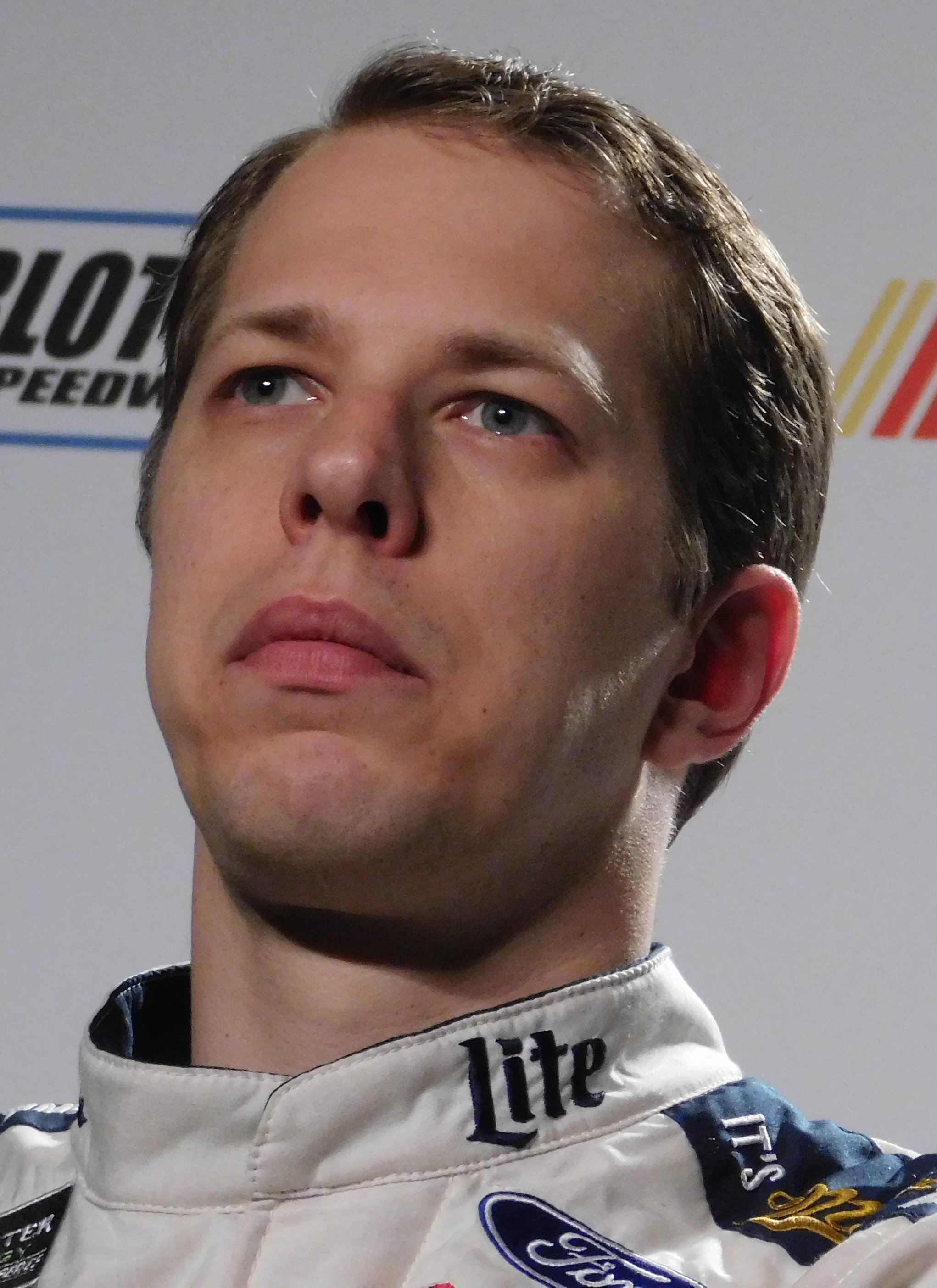
Brad Keselowski finished 10 points behind Martin Truex Jr., in fourth place.

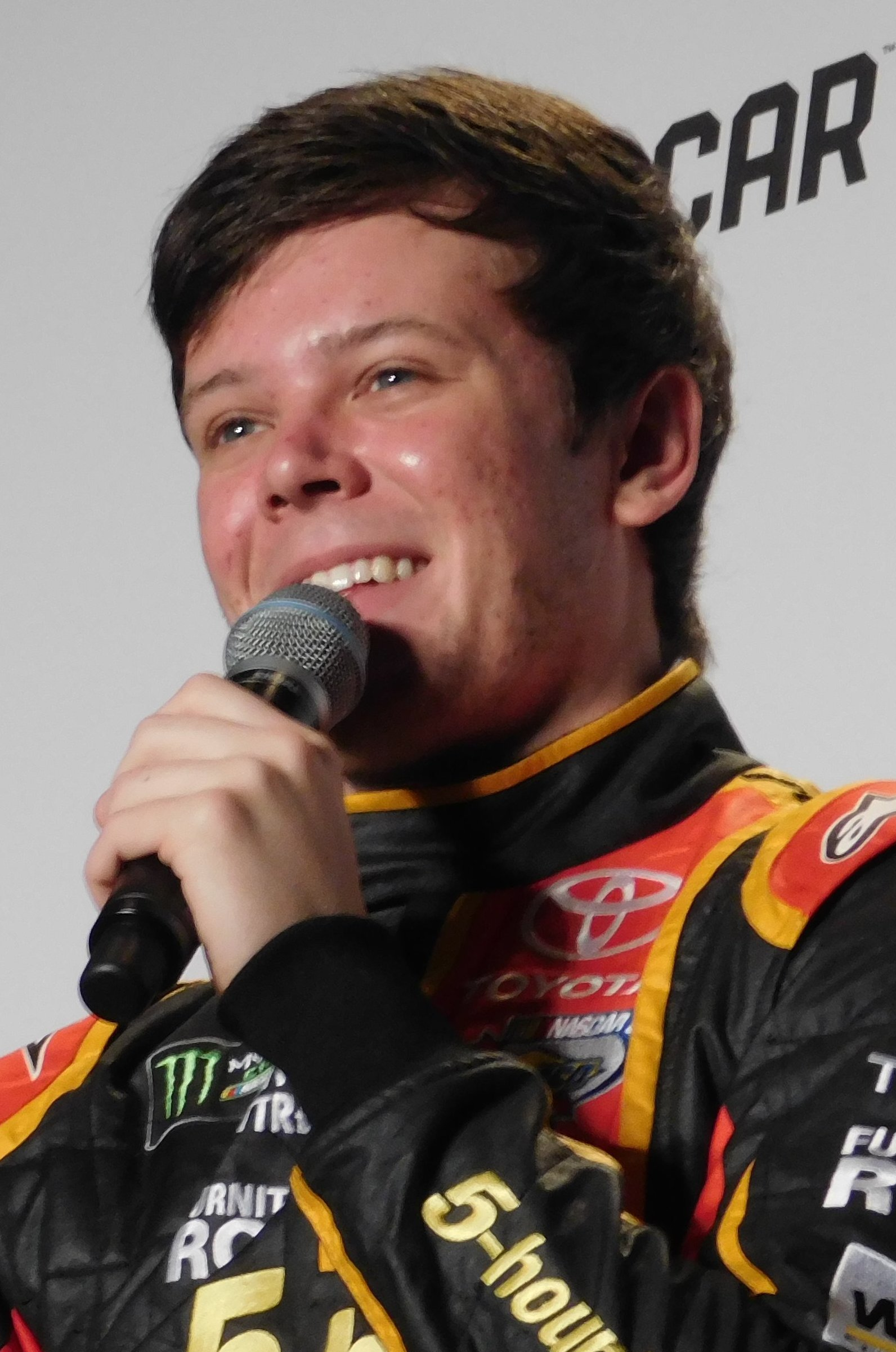
Erik Jones, the 2017 NASCAR Rookie of the Year

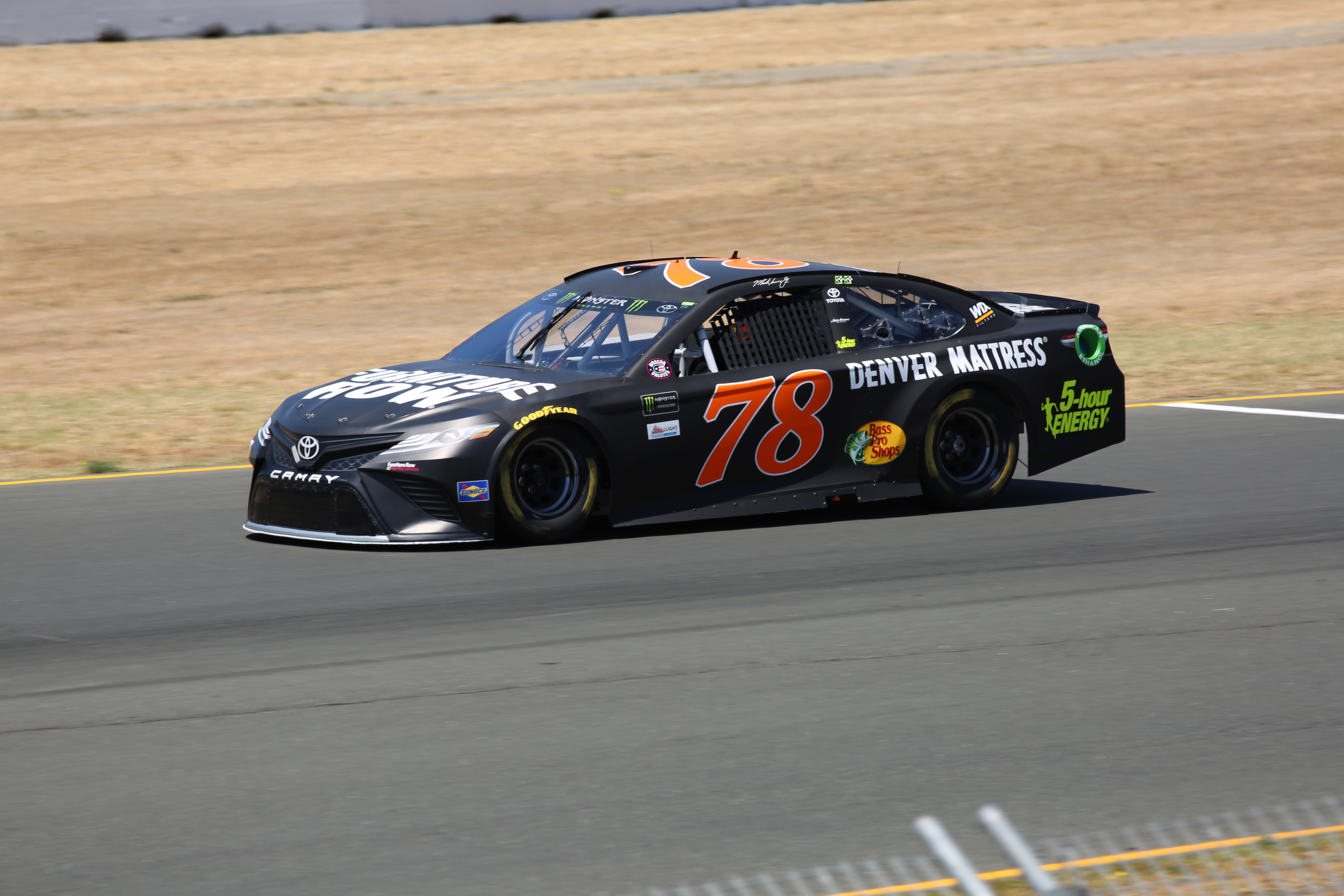
Toyota won their second manufacturer's championship with 16 wins and 1292 points.

The 2017 Monster Energy NASCAR Cup Series was the 69th season of professional stock car racing in the United States, and the 46th modern-era Cup series season. The season began at Daytona International Speedway with the Advance Auto Parts Clash, the Can-Am Duel qualifying races and the 59th running of the Daytona 500. The season ended with the Ford EcoBoost 400 at Homestead–Miami Speedway. Jimmie Johnson entered the season as the defending champion, having won his record-tying seventh Cup championship that he shares with Richard Petty and Dale Earnhardt. Martin Truex Jr. of Furniture Row Racing won the championship, his first in the series. Toyota won the Manufacturers' Championship for the second year in a row.

This was the third season of a 10-year television contract with Fox Sports and NBC Sports and the second of a five-year race sanctioning agreement with all tracks.

Monster Energy became the entitlement sponsor for the series in 2017 after Sprint Corporation decided not to remain as the sponsor. Sprint had been the title sponsor since 2004 when their partner Nextel replaced Winston after the 2003 season, but Sprint became the official sponsor for the 2008 season after buying out Nextel in late 2005. Monster Energy became the third title sponsor for NASCAR's top series since it first established such a sponsorship in 1971.

The 2017 season marked the final year for three full-time Cup Series drivers: Dale Earnhardt Jr., Matt Kenseth, and Danica Patrick. It was also the last season for Michael Waltrip. Additionally, Chevrolet retired the Chevrolet SS, replacing it with the Camaro ZL1 in 2018. It was announced that Target Corporation would end its NASCAR sponsorship with Chip Ganassi Racing following the 2017 season.

== Teams and drivers ==
All 36 full-time teams in 2017 were chartered teams.

=== Chartered teams ===
Manufacturer	Team	No.	Race driver	Crew chief
Chevrolet	Chip Ganassi Racing	1	Jamie McMurray	Matt McCall
Chevrolet	Chip Ganassi Racing	42	Kyle Larson	Chad Johnston 33; Tony Lunders 3
Chevrolet	Circle Sport – The Motorsports Group	33	Jeffrey Earnhardt 34	Pat Tryson 15; Frank Stoddard 2 Eddie Pardue 19
Chevrolet	Circle Sport – The Motorsports Group	33	Boris Said 2	Pat Tryson 15; Frank Stoddard 2 Eddie Pardue 19
Chevrolet	Germain Racing	13	Ty Dillon (R)	Bootie Barker
Chevrolet	Hendrick Motorsports	5	Kasey Kahne	Keith Rodden 27; Darian Grubb 9
Chevrolet	Hendrick Motorsports	24	Chase Elliott	Alan Gustafson 35; Kenny Francis 1
Chevrolet	Hendrick Motorsports	48	Jimmie Johnson	Chad Knaus
Chevrolet	Hendrick Motorsports	88	Dale Earnhardt Jr.	Greg Ives 35; Travis Mack 1
Chevrolet	JTG Daugherty Racing	37	Chris Buescher	Trent Owens
Chevrolet	JTG Daugherty Racing	47	A. J. Allmendinger	Randall Burnett 8 Ernie Cope 10; Tristan Smith 18
Chevrolet	Leavine Family Racing	95	Michael McDowell	Todd Parrott 31; Jon Leonard 5
Chevrolet	Richard Childress Racing	3	Austin Dillon	Slugger Labbe 10; Sammy Johns 1 Justin Alexander 25
Chevrolet	Richard Childress Racing	27	Paul Menard	Matt Borland
Chevrolet	Richard Childress Racing	31	Ryan Newman	Luke Lambert
Ford	Front Row Motorsports	34	Landon Cassill	Donnie Wingo 17; Seth Barbour 19
Ford	Front Row Motorsports	38	David Ragan	Derrick Finley
Ford	Go Fas Racing	32	Matt DiBenedetto	Gene Nead
Ford	Richard Petty Motorsports	43	Aric Almirola 29	Drew Blickensderfer 33; Scott McDougall 3
Ford	Richard Petty Motorsports	43	Regan Smith 2	Drew Blickensderfer 33; Scott McDougall 3
Ford	Richard Petty Motorsports	43	Bubba Wallace 4	Drew Blickensderfer 33; Scott McDougall 3
Ford	Richard Petty Motorsports	43	Billy Johnson 1	Drew Blickensderfer 33; Scott McDougall 3
Ford	Roush Fenway Racing	6	Trevor Bayne	Matt Puccia
Ford	Roush Fenway Racing	17	Ricky Stenhouse Jr.	Brian Pattie
Ford	Stewart–Haas Racing	4	Kevin Harvick	Rodney Childers 35; Daniel Knost 1
Ford	Stewart–Haas Racing	10	Danica Patrick	Billy Scott
Ford	Stewart–Haas Racing	14	Clint Bowyer	Mike Bugarewicz 35; Richard Boswell 1
Ford	Stewart–Haas Racing	41	Kurt Busch	Tony Gibson 35; Johnny Klausmeier 1
Ford	Team Penske	2	Brad Keselowski	Paul Wolfe 32; Brian Wilson 4
Ford	Team Penske	22	Joey Logano	Todd Gordon 33; Miles Stanley 3
Ford	Wood Brothers Racing	21	Ryan Blaney	Jeremy Bullins
Toyota	BK Racing	23	Joey Gase 4	Patrick Donahue 14; Randy Cox 22
Toyota	BK Racing	23	Gray Gaulding (R) 14	Patrick Donahue 14; Randy Cox 22
Toyota	BK Racing	23	Ryan Sieg 1	Patrick Donahue 14; Randy Cox 22
Toyota	BK Racing	23	Alon Day 1	Patrick Donahue 14; Randy Cox 22
Toyota	BK Racing	23	Corey LaJoie (R) 16	Patrick Donahue 14; Randy Cox 22
Toyota	Furniture Row Racing	77	Erik Jones (R)	Chris Gayle 34; James Small 2
Toyota	Furniture Row Racing	78	Martin Truex Jr.	Cole Pearn
Toyota	Joe Gibbs Racing	11	Denny Hamlin	Mike Wheeler 34; Chris Gabehart 2
Toyota	Joe Gibbs Racing	18	Kyle Busch	Adam Stevens 32; Ben Beshore 3 Jacob Canter 1
Toyota	Joe Gibbs Racing	19	Daniel Suárez (R)	Dave Rogers 5 Scott Graves 31
Toyota	Joe Gibbs Racing	20	Matt Kenseth	Jason Ratcliff
Chevrolet 35 Ford 1	TriStar Motorsports	72	Cole Whitt	Frank Kerr
Chevrolet 28 Toyota 8	Premium Motorsports	15	Michael Waltrip 1	Mark Hillman 24; Tommy Baldwin Jr. 12
Chevrolet 28 Toyota 8	Premium Motorsports	15	Reed Sorenson 23	Mark Hillman 24; Tommy Baldwin Jr. 12
Chevrolet 28 Toyota 8	Premium Motorsports	15	Joey Gase 2	Mark Hillman 24; Tommy Baldwin Jr. 12
Chevrolet 28 Toyota 8	Premium Motorsports	15	Ross Chastain 2	Mark Hillman 24; Tommy Baldwin Jr. 12
Chevrolet 28 Toyota 8	Premium Motorsports	15	Kevin O'Connell 1	Mark Hillman 24; Tommy Baldwin Jr. 12
Chevrolet 28 Toyota 8	Premium Motorsports	15	D. J. Kennington 2	Mark Hillman 24; Tommy Baldwin Jr. 12
Chevrolet 28 Toyota 8	Premium Motorsports	15	Gray Gaulding (R) 1	Mark Hillman 24; Tommy Baldwin Jr. 12
Chevrolet 28 Toyota 8	Premium Motorsports	15	Gary Klutt 1	Mark Hillman 24; Tommy Baldwin Jr. 12
Chevrolet 28 Toyota 8	Premium Motorsports	15	Derrike Cope 2	Mark Hillman 24; Tommy Baldwin Jr. 12
Chevrolet 28 Toyota 8	Premium Motorsports	15	Mark Thompson 1	Mark Hillman 24; Tommy Baldwin Jr. 12

=== Non-chartered teams ===
==== Complete schedule ====
No non-chartered teams ran full schedule in 2017. Originally, BK Racing's No. 83 Toyota, Rick Ware Racing's No. 51 Chevrolet, and Premium Motorsports' No. 55 Chevrolet/Toyota planned to run full schedule. However, they skipped occasional races.

==== Limited schedule ====
Manufacturer	Team	No.	Race driver	Crew chief	Round(s)
Chevrolet	Beard Motorsports	75	Brendan Gaughan	Darren Shaw	4
Chevrolet	Rick Ware Racing	51	Timmy Hill	Carlos Contreras 1 Joe Lax 8 Jeff Spraker 1 Tony Furr 15; Jonas Bell 5	10
Chevrolet	Rick Ware Racing	51	Cody Ware	Carlos Contreras 1 Joe Lax 8 Jeff Spraker 1 Tony Furr 15; Jonas Bell 5	5
Chevrolet	Rick Ware Racing	51	Josh Bilicki	Carlos Contreras 1 Joe Lax 8 Jeff Spraker 1 Tony Furr 15; Jonas Bell 5	2
Chevrolet	Rick Ware Racing	51	B. J. McLeod	Carlos Contreras 1 Joe Lax 8 Jeff Spraker 1 Tony Furr 15; Jonas Bell 5	8
Chevrolet	Rick Ware Racing	51	Ray Black Jr.	Carlos Contreras 1 Joe Lax 8 Jeff Spraker 1 Tony Furr 15; Jonas Bell 5	3
Chevrolet	Rick Ware Racing	51	Kyle Weatherman	Carlos Contreras 1 Joe Lax 8 Jeff Spraker 1 Tony Furr 15; Jonas Bell 5	2
Chevrolet	Tommy Baldwin Racing	7	Elliott Sadler	Kenneth Davis	3
Chevrolet	Tommy Baldwin Racing	7	J. J. Yeley	Kenneth Davis	4
Chevrolet	Premium Motorsports	7	Justin Marks	Kenneth Davis	1
Chevrolet	Premium Motorsports	7	Hermie Sadler	Kenneth Davis	1
Chevrolet	Premium Motorsports	7	Joey Gase	Kenneth Davis	2
Chevrolet	StarCom Racing	00	Derrike Cope	Tony Furr	2
Toyota	BK Racing	83	Corey LaJoie (R)	Doug Richert 21; Ryan Dubois 3 Randy Cox 8 Doug George 1	16
Toyota	BK Racing	83	Ryan Sieg	Doug Richert 21; Ryan Dubois 3 Randy Cox 8 Doug George 1	4
Toyota	BK Racing	83	Stephen Leicht	Doug Richert 21; Ryan Dubois 3 Randy Cox 8 Doug George 1	1
Toyota	BK Racing	83	Brett Moffitt	Doug Richert 21; Ryan Dubois 3 Randy Cox 8 Doug George 1	7
Toyota	BK Racing	83	Gray Gaulding (R)	Doug Richert 21; Ryan Dubois 3 Randy Cox 8 Doug George 1	4
Toyota	BK Racing	83	Joey Gase	Doug Richert 21; Ryan Dubois 3 Randy Cox 8 Doug George 1	1
Toyota	Gaunt Brothers Racing	96	D. J. Kennington	Keith Hinkein 1 Mike Ford 1	2
Chevrolet 12 Toyota 1	MBM Motorsports	66	Carl Long	George Church	3
Chevrolet 12 Toyota 1	MBM Motorsports	66	Timmy Hill	George Church	7
Chevrolet 12 Toyota 1	MBM Motorsports	66	David Starr	George Church	3
Chevrolet 10 Toyota 17	Premium Motorsports	55	Reed Sorenson	Wayne Carroll 19; Pat Tryson 8	6
Chevrolet 10 Toyota 17	Premium Motorsports	55	Derrike Cope	Wayne Carroll 19; Pat Tryson 8	11
Chevrolet 10 Toyota 17	Premium Motorsports	55	Tommy Regan	Wayne Carroll 19; Pat Tryson 8	1
Chevrolet 10 Toyota 17	Premium Motorsports	55	Gray Gaulding (R)	Wayne Carroll 19; Pat Tryson 8	8
Chevrolet 10 Toyota 17	Premium Motorsports	55	D. J. Kennington	Wayne Carroll 19; Pat Tryson 8	1

=== Changes ===
==== Teams ====
- Furniture Row Racing would expand to a two-car team with the addition of Erik Jones in the No. 77, who was previously with Joe Gibbs Racing in the No. 20 in the Xfinity Series in 2016. Sponsorship came from 5-Hour Energy.
- Circle Sport – Leavine Family Racing split following the 2016 season, with Circle Sport taking the charter. Leavine Family Racing purchased the charter from the No. 7 Tommy Baldwin Racing team to continue running the full season in 2017.
- JTG Daugherty Racing expanded to a two-car operation, leasing the charter from the No. 16 Roush Fenway Racing team.
- Roush Fenway Racing downsized to a two-car team, shutting down the No. 16 team.
- HScott Motorsports would not run in 2017. The team's leased charter for 2016 returned to Premium Motorsports, who sold its charter to Furniture Row Racing. Premium would subsequently purchase the HScott No. 15 charter.
- Go Fas Racing leased their charter to Wood Brothers Racing in order for the former charter to not be revoked. Immediately after, Richard Petty Motorsports would lease their No. 44 team charter to Go Fas Racing for 2017.
- Richard Petty Motorsports announced on December 16 that they would downsize to only the No. 43 Ford for the 2017 season.
- Circle Sport and The Motorsports Group will merge in 2017 after splitting with Leavine Family Racing following the 2016 season. They will run the No. 33 car full-time, and may enter the No. 30 car in some races.
- Tommy Baldwin Racing will field a part-time schedule with Elliott Sadler for the Daytona 500. They also drove at Texas with J. J. Yeley and with Elliott Sadler again at Talladega and was going to in Charlotte in May, but gave the ride to J. J. Yeley for unknown reasons. On September 21, 2017, Premium Motorsports' owner, Jay Robinson announced that he has acquired all assets from Tommy Baldwin Racing. The acquisition includes Baldwin's entire cup series inventory including everything from the team's race vehicles to their equipment. It also includes the trucks that were leased by TBR to the No. 52 NASCAR Camping World Truck Series Team but Baldwin says there remains a few obligations from his #7 team to be fulfilled in future races.
- Beard Motorsports will attempt to make the Daytona 500 with driver Brendan Gaughan. In late March, they announced they will run the other 3 plate races.
- Gaunt Brothers Racing will attempt to make their Cup Series debut with driver D. J. Kennington. They will also run the other 3 plate races in 2017. However, they were not entered in Daytona, possibly because D. J. Kennington is running for Premium Motorsports, and they didn't hire another driver.
- Rick Ware Racing announced that it would return to the Cup Series full-time in 2017 as an open team, with the No. 51 Chevrolet.
- TriStar Motorsports announced that it would return to the Cup Series full-time in 2017 after leasing a charter from Front Row Motorsports acquired from BK Racing, with the No. 72 Ford. Florida Lottery, RTIC Coolers, Rinnai and Carolina Skiff would be the sponsors of the team throughout the 2017 season. They also did get other sponsors for some races this season.
- MBM Motorsports announced that they would be running the No. 66 Chevrolet at Kansas. They also ran the Monster Energy Open and several other points-paying races.
- StarCom Racing announced that they would make their debut at the fall Dover race with Derrike Cope, but they withdrew. The team instead made their debut in the fall Kansas race.

==== Drivers ====
- Clint Bowyer will drive for Stewart–Haas Racing in the No. 14 car as Tony Stewart retired at the conclusion of the 2016 season. Bowyer drove for the now closed HScott Motorsports in 2016.
- Brian Scott, who drove the No. 44 Richard Petty Motorsports Ford in 2016, announced on November 10, 2016, that he was going to step away from NASCAR competition. Richard Petty Motorsports announced on December 16 that they will not hire a replacement driver.
- Greg Biffle, who had been with Roush since 1998, left Roush Fenway Racing at the end of 2016. Biffle ended up not getting a full-time ride for 2017 and instead became an analyst for NBC.
- Michael McDowell will run full-time in 2017 after sharing the car with Ty Dillon last year.
- Ty Dillon replaced Casey Mears in the No. 13 Germain Racing Chevrolet in 2017, competing for Rookie of the Year honors. Ty substituted and drove part-time for a couple teams last season.
- Chris Buescher will drive for JTG Daugherty Racing in the No. 37 car in 2017 on loan from Roush Fenway Racing. Buescher ran the No. 34 Ford Fusion for Front Row Motorsports in 2016.
- Matt DiBenedetto will drive the No. 32 Go FAS Racing Ford, replacing Jeffrey Earnhardt and various drivers. DiBenedetto drove multiple cars for BK Racing in 2016.
- On December 16, it was announced that David Ragan would return to Front Row Motorsports to drive the No. 38, for who he drove the No. 34 from 2012 to 2015. Ragan drove the No. 23 car for BK Racing in 2016.
- Landon Cassill will replace Chris Buescher in the No. 34. Cassill drove the No. 38 in 2016.
- Joey Gase drove the No. 23 for BK Racing for the Daytona 500, Kentucky in July, and Bristol in August and the No. 15 for Premium Motorsports at Talladega in April. Gase drove six races for Go FAS Racing in 2016.
- Elliott Sadler returned to the Cup series to drive for Tommy Baldwin Racing in the Daytona 500.
- In December 2016, NASCAR medically cleared Dale Earnhardt Jr. to compete in competition again for 2017 after missing the last 18 races in 2016. Alex Bowman drove in place of Earnhardt in the Advance Auto Parts Clash.
- On January 11, 2017, Carl Edwards, who finished fourth in the 2016 NASCAR Sprint Cup Series, announced his immediate retirement from the sport. That same day, Joe Gibbs Racing announced that 2016 NASCAR Xfinity Series champion Daniel Suárez would replace Edwards in the No. 19 Toyota Camry beginning at Daytona and running for Rookie of the Year honors.
- Brendan Gaughan successfully attempted to qualify for the Daytona 500 for Beard Motorsports.
- Timmy Hill will drive for Rick Ware Racing in the Daytona 500. Cody Ware, Kevin O'Connell, Stanton Barrett, and Josh Bilicki will split the ride throughout the season. However, the team skipped Talladega in April for unknown reasons. They also skipped Michigan in June because Cody Ware suffered back issues and couldn't run the race. They didn't find a replacement driver in time.
- Reed Sorenson will drive for Premium Motorsports in the No. 55 Toyota in the Daytona 500. The team will drive Toyota in the restrictor plate races and Chevrolet in the remaining races. As of now, Sorenson will attempt to qualify for the 500 and Talladega in May in the No. 55 and in the No. 15 Toyota for probably the rest of the season. Although he surprisingly didn't run the 55 at Dover when Ross Chastain was in the 15.
- Gray Gaulding will run for Rookie of the Year driving the No. 23 Toyota for BK Racing for 33 races and the No. 83 Toyota for two races. He was not approved to run the Daytona 500. However he was replaced by Ryan Sieg at Michigan and by Alon Day at Sonoma. BK Racing alleged financial decision. However he returned to BK Racing in the fall and has been running the No. 83 lately.
- Michael Waltrip announced he will run the Daytona 500, driving the No. 15 Aaron's, Inc. Toyota for Premium Motorsports. It was his final start in NASCAR-sanctioned racing.
- Cole Whitt will drive the No. 72 Ford for TriStar Motorsports full-time in 2017. Whitt drove multiple cars for Premium Motorsports in 2016.
- Corey LaJoie will drive the No. 83 Toyota for BK Racing in 14 races. Ryan Sieg drove at Dover.
- Former Daytona 500 winner Derrike Cope returned to the Cup Series, driving the No. 55 in a limited schedule for Premium Motorsports, with the possibility of a full schedule dependent on sponsorship beginning in Atlanta in March. Cope left the team after the fall Richmond race.
- Aric Almirola suffered a compression fracture in his back in a crash at Kansas, taking him out for 8 to 12 weeks. Regan Smith drove Almirola's No. 43 at Charlotte and Dover while Xfinity series regular Bubba Wallace drove until Almirola returns from full recovery with the exception of Sonoma which was run by Billy Johnson, who previously ran road course races in the Xfinity Series for Roush-Fenway. Roush-Fenway Racing's operations are suspended for the No. 6 Xfinity team after the Xfinity race at Pocono. Billy Johnson drove the No. 43 at Sonoma. Almirola returned at New Hampshire.
- Josh Bilicki, Tommy Regan, Kevin O'Connell, Billy Johnson and Alon Day all made their Cup debut at Sonoma.
- Gary Klutt made his Cup debut at Watkins Glen driving for Premium Motorsports in the #15
- On August 2, 2017, Brett Moffitt returned to the Cup Series, driving the No. 83 Toyota Camry for BK Racing, for 2 races at Watkins Glen and Michigan. Moffitt last competed in the Cup Series in 2015, driving the No. 55 Toyota Camry for the now defunct Michael Waltrip Racing, and the No. 34 Ford Fusion for Front Row Motorsports, while also winning Rookie of the Year honors. In 2017, Moffitt was supposed to run the full NASCAR Camping World Truck Series schedule, driving the No. 7 Toyota Tundra for Red Horse Racing, but the team shut down in mid-May. Moffitt also made a NASCAR Xfinity Series appearance in 2017, driving the No. 96 Chevrolet Camaro for GMS Racing at Iowa in July.
- On August 30, 2017, it was announced that Hermie Sadler will drive the 7 car for Tommy Baldwin Racing at Martinsville after a 5-year absence from the cup series.
- After leaving Premium Motorsports after the fall Richmond race, Derrike Cope returned to the cup series with StarCom Racing in the No. 00 at Kansas.
- On October 10, 2017, it was announced that Justin Marks would drive the No. 7 car for Tommy Baldwin Racing at Talladega.

==== Crew chiefs ====
- Chris Gayle will be the crew chief of the No. 77 Furniture Row Racing Toyota for Erik Jones in 2017. Gayle previously crew chiefed the No. 18 team in the Xfinity Series in 2016.
- Matt Borland will take over crew chief duties of the No. 27 Richard Childress Racing Chevrolet with Paul Menard, replacing Danny Stockman. Borland was the vice president of technology for Stewart–Haas Racing in 2016.
- Brian Pattie will move over from the No. 16 team to the No. 17 team to crew chief.
- Wayne Carroll will become crew chief for the No. 55 team. Pat Tryson, who was the crew chief for the team in 2016, will move to crew chief the No. 33 team.
- On March 29, 2017, it was announced that Dave Rogers, the crew chief of the No. 19 team, would take an indefinite personal leave of absence, with Scott Graves replacing him.
- On May 22, 2017, it was announced that Slugger Labbe, the crew chief of the No. 3 team, would be leaving Richard Childress Racing to pursue other opportunities. Justin Alexander, who is the crew chief of RCR's No. 2 NASCAR Xfinity Series team will replace Labbe.
- On June 10, 2017, it was announced that Patrick Donahue, the crew chief of the No. 23 team, would be leaving BK Racing to pursue other opportunities. Randy Cox will replace Donahue at Michigan.
- On July 3, 2017, it was announced that Donnie Wingo, the crew chief of the No. 34 team, would be named the new competition director of Front Row Motorsports starting at Kentucky. Seth Barbour, who was the crew chief of Roush's No. 6 Xfinity Series team (that shut down a month before at that time) will replace Wingo.
- On September 18, 2017, it was announced that Keith Rodden, the crew chief of the No. 5 team, would be replaced by Hendrick Motorsports vehicle production director, Darian Grubb, for the remainder of the 2017 season beginning at Loudon. It will be Grubb's first start as a crew chief since the 2015 season, when he was crew chief for Carl Edwards at Joe Gibbs Racing.

==== Manufacturers ====
- Stewart–Haas Racing would switch from Chevrolet to Ford. As part of the transition, Roush-Yates would provide engines to the team.
- On January 9, 2017, at the North American International Auto Show, Toyota unveiled a new Camry body based on the newly unveiled 2018 model, marking the first time that Toyota developed production and racing versions of a vehicle concurrently.

== Offseason changes ==
=== New race format and points system ===
The 2017 season introduced major changes to the format of races and the points system in all three of NASCAR's national series, announced during a press conference on January 23, 2017. Most races are divided into three stages, with most races seeing the first two segments consisting of roughly a quarter distance with the third stage being half distance. The only points race exception is the Coca-Cola 600, which is split into 4 100-lap stages. A race is considered official after the completion of the second stage (equating roughly to the previous requirement of 50% of the scheduled distance under the previous format), meaning that the race can be halted with a winner during the third stage due to factors such as darkness or inclement weather. A competition caution is held at the end of each stage, during which drivers may optionally take a pit stop before the restart for the next stage. Additionally, the pit road is closed once the leader of the race crosses the start-finish-line with 2 laps to go in the stage.

The top 10 drivers at the end of the first and second stages receive championship points, awarded on a descending scale from 10 to 1. The overall winner of each race following the final stage receives 40 points, and the remaining drivers are awarded points on a descending scale from 35 for a 2nd-place finish, to 2 for 35th, and 1 for 36th through 40th. The winner of each stage also receives a "playoff point", and the overall winner receives five. For the first time since 1971, the Can-Am Duel qualifying races for the Daytona 500 became points-paying races; the top-ten finishers in each of the two races received points.

Following the 26-race regular season, the 16 drivers with the most wins, with championship points as a tiebreaker, will qualify for the playoffs (re-branded from the "Chase for the Championship"). At this point the top 10 drivers on the championship points standings will be awarded additional playoff points; the regular-season champion will receive 15, second place will receive 10, and the remainder descending from 8 to 1. If a driver qualifies for the post-season, their championship points will be reset to 2000, and their banked playoff points will be added to this total. The playoffs will continue to use the existing multi-round elimination format; playoff points will be carried over through all but the final race of the season.

NASCAR's executive vice president and chief racing development officer Steve O'Donnell stated that the new format was designed to "[put] a premium on every victory and every in-race position over the course of the season. Each point can eventually result in winning or losing a championship."

=== Damaged vehicle policy ===
On February 8, 2017, NASCAR announced a new Damaged Vehicle Policy, also taking effect in the 2017 season across all three national series. Cars may return to pit road for up to five minutes for minor repairs if they are involved in accidents, including repairing sheet metal, use of fasteners and/or tape to re-attach body panels, and reinforcing body panels. The five-minute interval begins when the car crosses the pit road commitment line, and ends once the car reaches minimum speed after exiting pit road; the car may return for another five-minute repair window if further repairs are still necessary. If a car is not able to return to pit road unassisted, the car is immediately deemed retired from the race.

Crews may no longer replace vehicle body parts that are damaged via contact or accidents. If the damage was significant enough that the car must be taken to the garage, more than six crew members work on the car, or the five-minute time limit expires, the car was automatically disqualified and could not return to the race. If the driver commits a pit road infraction, 15 seconds are deducted from the repair time as a penalty. Mechanical or electrical failures not caused by an on-track incident are exempt from these rules; they may be repaired on pit road or in the garage with no time restrictions.

Senior vice president of competition Scott Miller explained that the new rule was meant to improve safety, explaining that "It's more about crashed vehicles and all that is involved with that, from the crew guys to the drivers to dropping more debris on the track, which always happens. So there are exceptions for mechanical failures, those things can be rectified in the garage. That's going to be up to the series director's discretion to make those calls, but it's not going to be that difficult. These rules severely restrict the ability for cars to return to the race multiple laps down in hopes of gaining minimal points.

=== Technical changes ===
Besides the new points system and stage structure, other rule changes were announced over the off-season;

- Teams must start a race using the same tires that were used during qualifying.
- Based on usage research by Goodyear and NASCAR, tire allocations have changed for some races. Teams will have one fewer set of tires for Daytona (500), Phoenix, Fontana, Martinsville (Spring), Bristol, Kansas, Kentucky, and Chicagoland. Homestead will have two fewer sets allocated, down from twelve. Talladega, Sonoma, Daytona (400), New Hampshire, Watkins Glen, and Darlington will have an additional tire set allocated.
- In response to increasing speeds at Daytona and Talladega, restrictor plate sizes were reduced from 57/64 of an inch to 7/8 of an inch.
- For non-restrictor plate races, the rear spoiler dimensions were reduced from 3 1/2 x 61 inches to 2 3/8 inches x 61 inches. Restrictor plate races (Daytona and Talladega) will continue to use the previous size (3 1/2 x 53 inches). However, in Kentucky and Michigan, the rear spoiler dimensions were 2 1/2 x 53 inches.

=== Safety ===
Several vehicle safety changes would be mandatory for all races, including revised steering column mounting, and garage-only fuel couplers. Anti-intrusion plating, escape hatches and toeboard foam would also be required on all restrictor plate races, but would be optional on all other races.

NASCAR partnered with American Medical Response to form a traveling medical team for the series. Additionally, NASCAR expanded the concussion protocol which would see drivers involved in accidents undergo additional concussion testing before being allowed to return to the race track.

== Schedule ==
The final calendar – comprising 36 races, as well as exhibition races, which are the Advance Auto Parts Clash, Can-Am Duel qualifying duel races for the Daytona 500 and the All-Star Race – was released on May 5, 2016. At the beginning of the 2017 season, Atlanta Motor Speedway would host NASCAR's 2,500th race, one week after the Daytona 500.

No	Race title	Track	Location	Date	Time (ET)
	Advance Auto Parts Clash	Daytona International Speedway	Daytona Beach, Florida	February 19^{1}	11:30 AM
	Can-Am Duel	Daytona International Speedway	Daytona Beach, Florida	February 23	7:00 PM
1	Daytona 500	Daytona International Speedway	Daytona Beach, Florida	February 26	2:00 PM
2	Folds of Honor QuikTrip 500	Atlanta Motor Speedway	Hampton, Georgia	March 5	2:30 PM
3	Kobalt 400	Las Vegas Motor Speedway	Las Vegas, Nevada	March 12	3:30 PM
4	Camping World 500	Phoenix International Raceway	Avondale, Arizona	March 19	3:30 PM
5	Auto Club 400	Auto Club Speedway	Fontana, California	March 26	3:30 PM
6	STP 500	Martinsville Speedway	Ridgeway, Virginia	April 2	2:00 PM
7	O'Reilly Auto Parts 500	Texas Motor Speedway	Fort Worth, Texas	April 9	1:30 PM
8	Food City 500	Bristol Motor Speedway	Bristol, Tennessee	April 24^{2}	1:00 PM
9	Toyota Owners 400	Richmond Raceway	Richmond, Virginia	April 30	2:00 PM
10	GEICO 500	Talladega Superspeedway	Lincoln, Alabama	May 7	2:00 PM
11	Go Bowling 400	Kansas Speedway	Kansas City, Kansas	May 13	7:30 PM
	Monster Energy Open	Charlotte Motor Speedway	Concord, North Carolina	May 20	6:00 PM
	Monster Energy NASCAR All-Star Race	Charlotte Motor Speedway	Concord, North Carolina	May 20	8:00 PM
12	Coca-Cola 600	Charlotte Motor Speedway	Concord, North Carolina	May 28	6:00 PM
13	AAA 400 Drive for Autism	Dover International Speedway	Dover, Delaware	June 4	1:00 PM
14	Axalta presents the Pocono 400	Pocono Raceway	Long Pond, Pennsylvania	June 11	3:00 PM
15	FireKeepers Casino 400	Michigan International Speedway	Cambridge Township, Michigan	June 18	3:00 PM
16	Toyota/Save Mart 350	Sonoma Raceway	Sonoma, California	June 25	3:00 PM
17	Coke Zero 400	Daytona International Speedway	Daytona Beach, Florida	July 1	7:30 PM
18	Quaker State 400	Kentucky Speedway	Sparta, Kentucky	July 8	7:30 PM
19	Overton's 301	New Hampshire Motor Speedway	Loudon, New Hampshire	July 16	3:00 PM
20	Brantley Gilbert Big Machine Brickyard 400	Indianapolis Motor Speedway	Speedway, Indiana	July 23	3:00 PM
21	Overton's 400	Pocono Raceway	Long Pond, Pennsylvania	July 30	3:00 PM
22	I Love New York 355 at The Glen	Watkins Glen International	Watkins Glen, New York	August 6	3:00 PM
23	Pure Michigan 400	Michigan International Speedway	Cambridge Township, Michigan	August 13	3:00 PM
24	Bass Pro Shops NRA Night Race	Bristol Motor Speedway	Bristol, Tennessee	August 19	7:30 PM
25	Bojangles' Southern 500	Darlington Raceway	Darlington, South Carolina	September 3	6:00 PM
26	Federated Auto Parts 400	Richmond Raceway	Richmond, Virginia	September 9	7:30 PM
Monster Energy NASCAR Cup Series Playoffs
Round of 16
27	Tales of the Turtles 400	Chicagoland Speedway	Joliet, Illinois	September 17	3:00 PM
28	ISM Connect 300	New Hampshire Motor Speedway, Loudon, New Hampshire	Loudon, New Hampshire	September 24	2:00 PM
29	Apache Warrior 400	Dover International Speedway	Dover, Delaware	October 1	2:00 PM
Round of 12
30	Bank of America 500	Charlotte Motor Speedway	Concord, North Carolina	October 8	1:00 PM
31	Alabama 500	Talladega Superspeedway, Lincoln, Alabama	Lincoln, Alabama	October 15	2:00 PM
32	Hollywood Casino 400	Kansas Speedway	Kansas City, Kansas	October 22	3:00 PM
Round of 8
33	First Data 500	Martinsville Speedway	Ridgeway, Virginia	October 29	3:00 PM
34	AAA Texas 500	Texas Motor Speedway	Fort Worth, Texas	November 5	2:00 PM
35	Can-Am 500	Phoenix International Raceway	Avondale, Arizona	November 12	2:30 PM
Championship 4
36	Ford EcoBoost 400	Homestead–Miami Speedway	Homestead, Florida	November 19	2:30 PM

Key changes from 2016 include:

- The Daytona 500 would be held one week later.
- The O'Reilly Auto Parts 500 at Texas Motor Speedway would move from Saturday night to Sunday afternoon.
- The AAA Texas 500 at Texas Motor Speedway would move from Sunday night to Sunday afternoon.
- The AAA 400 Drive for Autism would move after the Coca-Cola 600 and before the Axalta presents the Pocono 400.
- Bristol and Michigan would swap their August race dates, returning to the order that was used through 2015 (the 2016 swap was necessitated by NBC's coverage of the 2016 Summer Olympics).
- Talladega and Kansas would swap their October race dates, moving the Round of 12 elimination race from Talladega to Kansas.
- The August off week would move back between Bristol and Darlington. It was between Watkins Glen and Bristol in 2016.
- In broadcasting changes, the races at Indianapolis, Bristol (summer), and Talladega (fall) would move from NBCSN to NBC, while the races at Darlington, Kansas (fall), and Texas (fall) would move from NBC to NBCSN. With the move, all four restrictor-plate races would be broadcast over-the-air for the first time since 2006. Watkins Glen would return to NBCSN after the 2016 running aired on USA due to NBC's coverage of the 2016 Summer Olympics.
- The ISM Connect 300 was the final Playoff race for New Hampshire Motor Speedway as a second race at Las Vegas Motor Speedway took its place.
- At the time of the schedule announcement, the Bank of America 500 was scheduled for Saturday, October 7. On April 20, the race was rescheduled for Sunday, October 8 and moved from a night race to a day race. The race broadcast was also moved to NBC, while Texas' November race was moved to NBCSN.
- The Monster Energy Open was originally scheduled for May 19. But the race was moved to May 20, marking the first time since 2013 when the Open was right before the All-Star Race. Both events also started slightly earlier in the evening, with the All-Star Race starting at 8:00 PM ET, due to FS1 programming commitments.
- The Bank of America 500 would be the final playoff race at Charlotte held on the 1.5 mile oval, as the 2018 race would be held on the track's infield combined road course (Roval).

== Season summary ==
=== Race reports ===
Speedweeks 2017

Daytona Speedweeks started with the Advance Auto Parts Clash. It was originally scheduled to take place on Saturday, but was postponed until Sunday due to rain. Defending winner Denny Hamlin led the most laps. Multiple wrecks took out some of the field including Kurt Busch getting into the wall after contact with Jimmie Johnson, Johnson would also get into the wall later on, and Martin Truex Jr. got into the wall after contact with Kyle Larson. On the last lap, Brad Keselowski tried to make a pass on Hamlin, but Hamlin came down and got into Keselowski and the two wrecked. Joey Logano sneaked through to win.

Chase Elliott won the pole for the Daytona 500 in qualifying. It was the second consecutive 500 pole for Elliott and the third consecutive for the No. 24 team. (Jeff Gordon won the pole in 2015). It first time since Ken Schrader in 1989 and 1990 that a driver won back-to-back Daytona 500 poles. Elliott's teammate Dale Earnhardt Jr. qualified second.

The Can-Am Duels were held on Thursday. Chase Elliott started on the pole in the first duel. Reed Sorenson made contact with Corey LaJoie and hit the wall. On the restart, Elliott held off Jamie McMurray to win. In the second Duel, Dale Earnhardt Jr. started on pole and led the most laps. Ryan Blaney and Jimmie Johnson made contact after both had tire problems. On the restart, Denny Hamlin took the lead from Earnhardt with two laps to go and held off Clint Bowyer to win. Elliott Sadler, Brendan Gaughan, Corey LaJoie, and D. J. Kennington all qualified for the Daytona 500 while Reed Sorenson and Timmy Hill failed to qualify.

Round 1 - Daytona: Daytona 500

Chase Elliott started the race on the pole. The race was plagued with a number of wrecks, with 35 of the 40 cars involved in wrecks during the race. The race also featured the debut of stage racing. Kyle Busch won Stage 1 of the race. Dale Earnhardt Jr. took the lead in stage two after pit stops and was leading when Kyle Busch had a tire go down. Busch spun and collected Erik Jones, Matt Kenseth, Earnhardt, and Ty Dillon in a multicar wreck. Kevin Harvick won Stage 2 of the race. Toward the beginning of the third stage, a multicar wreck that started with Jimmie Johnson that also involved Harvick, Danica Patrick, Denny Hamlin, Chris Buescher, Trevor Bayne, and other drivers. Another multicar wreck with 50 laps to go involved Jamie McMurray, Ryan Newman, Brad Keselowski, Landon Cassill, and other drivers. Elliott was leading the race as it headed into the closing laps. In the final few laps, the lead would shuffle, with Kyle Larson taking the lead after passing Martin Truex Jr. On the final lap, Kurt Busch passed Larson for the lead and won the race, his first Daytona 500 win and the first Daytona 500 win for Stewart–Haas Racing. Michael Waltrip, making his 784th and final career Cup Series start, finished 8th.

Round 2 - Atlanta: Folds of Honor QuikTrip 500

Kevin Harvick started on pole. Multiple drivers had tire problems and pit road speeding issues during the race. Drivers such as Chase Elliott, Martin Truex Jr., Dale Earnhardt Jr., Jimmie Johnson, and other drivers had these problems during the race. Harvick dominated the race and won both Stage 1 and Stage 2. On the final round of pit stops, Harvick got caught for speeding on pit road and had to come back losing the lead. Brad Keselowski held off Kyle Larson to get his first career win at Atlanta.

Round 3 - Las Vegas: Kobalt 400

Brad Keselowski started on pole. Keselowski led the first 60 laps, but Martin Truex Jr. took the lead on pit road. Corey LaJoie and Kevin Harvick crashed in different incidents in the first stage. Truex dominated the race by leading the most laps and winning Stage 1 and Stage 2. Keselowski took the lead from Truex with 24 laps to go. Keselowski had a power issue and it allowed Truex to regain the lead and hold off Kyle Larson to win as Kyle Busch was spun after contact with Joey Logano. Busch and Logano got into an altercation afterwards until Logano was pulled away.

Round 4 - Phoenix: Camping World 500

Joey Logano started on pole. In the first stage, Logano led most of the laps and had some opponents for the lead within the final laps of Stage 1. Logano, Kyle Larson, Chase Elliott, Jamie McMurray, and Kyle Busch were all in a pack racing for the win, but Logano was able to hold on to win the stage. For the second stage, Logano started to pull away, however; he got three wide with Larson and Elliott and allowed Elliott to take the lead. Logano got a pit road speeding penalty and Elliott was able to hold off Larson to win the second stage. In the third and final stage, Elliott pulled away, but it was Kyle Busch eventually took the lead. Busch there on dominated the race, leading 114 laps, and was heading toward the win, but a caution came out with six laps to go when Logano had a flat tire and ran into the wall, setting up an overtime finish. Ryan Newman, who stayed out, pulled away from Larson to score the win for his only win with Richard Childress Racing, his first win since 2013, and his last Cup Series win to date.

Round 5 - Fontana: Auto Club 400

Kyle Larson started on pole. Denny Hamlin, who started second, could not get going and that held up his lane which caused Brad Keselowski to receive damage after running into the back of Hamlin. Keselowski made contact with Jimmie Johnson, which sent him spinning bringing out the first caution. Larson and Martin Truex Jr. were the two dominant cars of the race with Larson winning Stage 1 and Truex winning Stage 2. Truex had the lead, but green-flag pit stops allowed Larson to regain the lead. Gray Gaulding spun bringing out the caution with 20 laps to go, but on the restart the caution would come out again after Matt Kenseth hit the backstretch wall after getting hit in the back by Truex. On the restart, Ricky Stenhouse Jr. spun on the backstretch, which sent the race into overtime. Larson held off Keselowski, who made a comeback after his early spin, to get his second career win and also sweeping the weekend.

Round 6 - Martinsville: STP 500

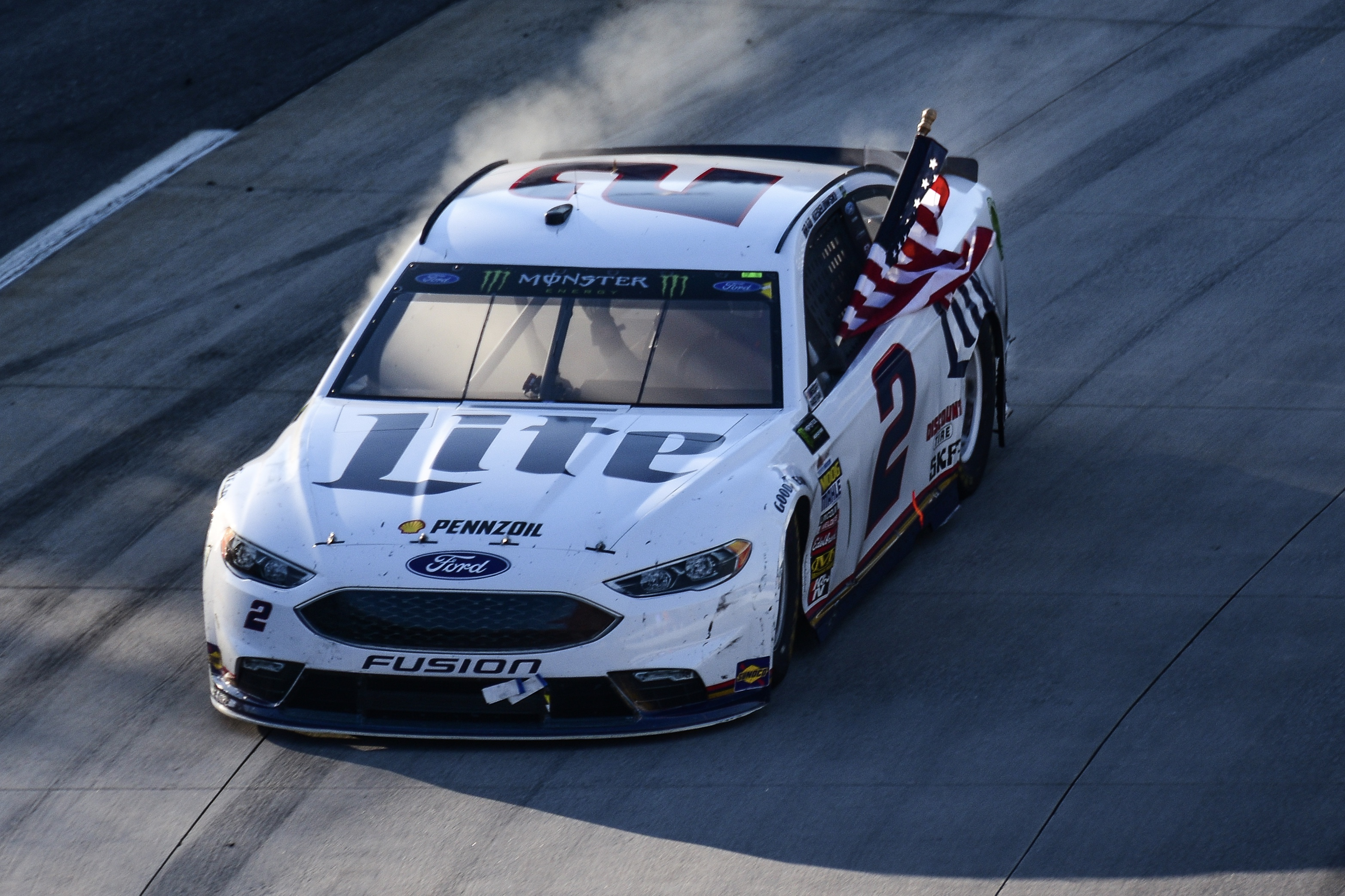
Brad Keselowski celebrates his win in the STP 500 at Martinsville Speedway.

Kyle Larson started on pole after qualifying was rained out on Friday. Larson led the first few laps, but began to fall back. Stage 1 was won by Martin Truex Jr. In the second stage, Kyle Busch led most of the laps, but a run-in with Ricky Stenhouse Jr. allowed Chase Elliott to pass Busch on the final lap. In the final stage, multiple drivers were involved in wrecks including Dale Earnhardt Jr., Kurt Busch, Daniel Suárez, and others. The last 150 laps were a battle between Kyle Busch and Brad Keselowski. Keselowski was able to get around Busch and lead the final laps to get his second win of the season.

Round 7 - Texas: O'Reilly Auto Parts 500

Kevin Harvick started on pole. Harvick led early until he got passed by Ryan Blaney on a restart for a caution for a wreck between Gray Gaulding and Jeffrey Earnhardt. Blaney then dominated the race, leading 148 laps and winning Stage 1 and Stage 2 however, trouble on pit road kept him from winning. Joey Logano used pit strategy to have the lead in the final laps. Jimmie Johnson took the lead from Logano with 16 laps to go and held off a hard charging Kyle Larson for his seventh career win at Texas.

Round 8 - Bristol: Food City 500

Kyle Larson started on pole after qualifying was rained out. The race was postponed from Sunday afternoon to Monday afternoon because of rain. Larson dominated the race, leading 203 laps and winning Stage 1. Martin Truex Jr. won Stage 2. Several drivers had problems including Ryan Blaney having fuel pump problems, Brad Keselowski having multiple issues, and wrecks for Dale Earnhardt Jr., Kyle Busch, Danica Patrick, and Erik Jones. Larson and Truex both received speeding penalties. Johnson held off Clint Bowyer to get his second straight win and second at Bristol.

Round 9 - Richmond: Toyota Owners 400

Matt Kenseth started on pole. A few laps into the race, Erik Jones crashed into the wall. Kenseth led every lap to win Stage 1. Kenseth led halfway into the second stage, but was passed by Brad Keselowski. Keselowski pulled away to win the second stage. In the final stage during green flag pit stops, teammates Jimmie Johnson and Dale Earnhardt Jr. got together, putting Earnhardt into the wall. On the restart, Earnhardt had a tire go down and again got into the wall. On the restart, Logano took the lead from Keselowski, but Ryan Blaney had a tire go down and got into the wall. Logano took the lead from Kyle Larson, and held off a hard charging Keselowski for his first win of the season and second at Richmond. Days later, it was announced that Logano's win had been encumbered due to a penalty when it was discovered that the car had a higher rear-end suspension.

Round 10 - Talladega: GEICO 500

Ricky Stenhouse Jr. started on pole. Stenhouse led early, but fell back after having trash on his grill. There were various different leaders throughout the race including Denny Hamlin, Kyle Busch, Joey Logano, Brad Keselowski, and others. Kyle Larson got into the wall early as Keselowski won stage one and Hamlin won stage two after leading most of the stage. Ryan Blaney was involved in an accident after hitting the wall. There was a big wreck that involved Chase Elliott, A. J. Allmendinger, Logano, Kevin Harvick, Keselowski, Matt Kenseth, and others. On the restart, Landon Cassill had a tire go down and brought out the caution because he wasn't able to make it to pit road. On the restart, Ryan Newman got into the wall, sending the race to overtime. On the two-lap shootout, Stenhouse drove past Kyle Busch and held off Jamie McMurray for his first career win and the first for Roush Fenway Racing since 2014 and the first for the 17 team since Matt Kenseth in 2012.

Round 11 - Kansas: Go Bowling 400

Ryan Blaney started on pole for the first time in his career. Blaney led early and swapped the lead with Kyle Busch and Martin Truex Jr. in the early stages. Busch won the first stage and Blaney won the second. Landon Cassill, Erik Jones, Corey Lajoie, and Gray Gaulding all had trouble. Ryan Newman suffered a blown engine and Paul Menard and A. J. Allmendinger crashed together. In the late part of the race, Joey Logano had a tire go down and crashed into Danica Patrick, causing Patrick to hit the wall extremely hard. Aric Almirola crashed head on into Logano and had to be cut from the car and taken to the hospital with a T5 Vertebra compression fracture in his back. Kurt Busch and Jimmie Johnson got together on a restart. On the last restart, Truex held off Brad Keselowski for his second win of the season.

Exhibition - Charlotte: Monster Energy NASCAR All-Star Race

In the Monster Energy Open, Clint Bowyer started on pole and led all 20 laps in stage one to transfer to the All-Star Race as Ryan Blaney did the same in stage two to transfer. In the final stage, Landon Cassill took two tires, but spun on the restart. The battle for the win came down to Chase Elliott, Daniel Suárez, and Erik Jones. Jones attempted to make a pass as Elliott and Suárez were side by side for the lead, but got into the grass and destroyed the front end of his car. On the restart, Suárez pulled away from Elliott to win and transfer to the All-Star Race. Elliott also transferred by winning the fan vote. Kyle Larson started on pole and won the first two stages. Jimmie Johnson made a pass on Clint Bowyer and headed to the stage three win. Johnson, Larson, Kevin Harvick, Denny Hamlin, Kyle Busch, Brad Keselowski, Joey Logano, Jamie McMurray, Kurt Busch, and Chase Elliott were the ten drivers that advanced to the final ten lap stage. Keselowski stayed off pit road and led off the restart, but was passed by Kyle Busch and Busch held off a battle between Johnson and Larson to win the All-Star Race in his twelfth try.

Round 12 - Charlotte: Coca-Cola 600

Kevin Harvick started on pole. Harvick and Kyle Busch traded the lead early. Jeffrey Earnhardt got oil on the track and Chase Elliott got into it and slowed down and was from behind by Brad Keselowski. Kyle Busch led most of stage one and passed Martin Truex Jr. to claim the stage win. Truex pulled away on the restart, but Matt DiBenedetto crashed into the wall. After a delay due to thunderstorms, Truex won the second stage. Denny Hamlin got the lead off pit road and won the third stage. Fuel mileage played a factor as Jimmie Johnson ran out of fuel with two laps to go and it allowed Austin Dillon to get his first career win and the first for the #3 since Dale Earnhardt at Talladega in 2000.

Round 13 - Dover: AAA 400 Drive for Autism

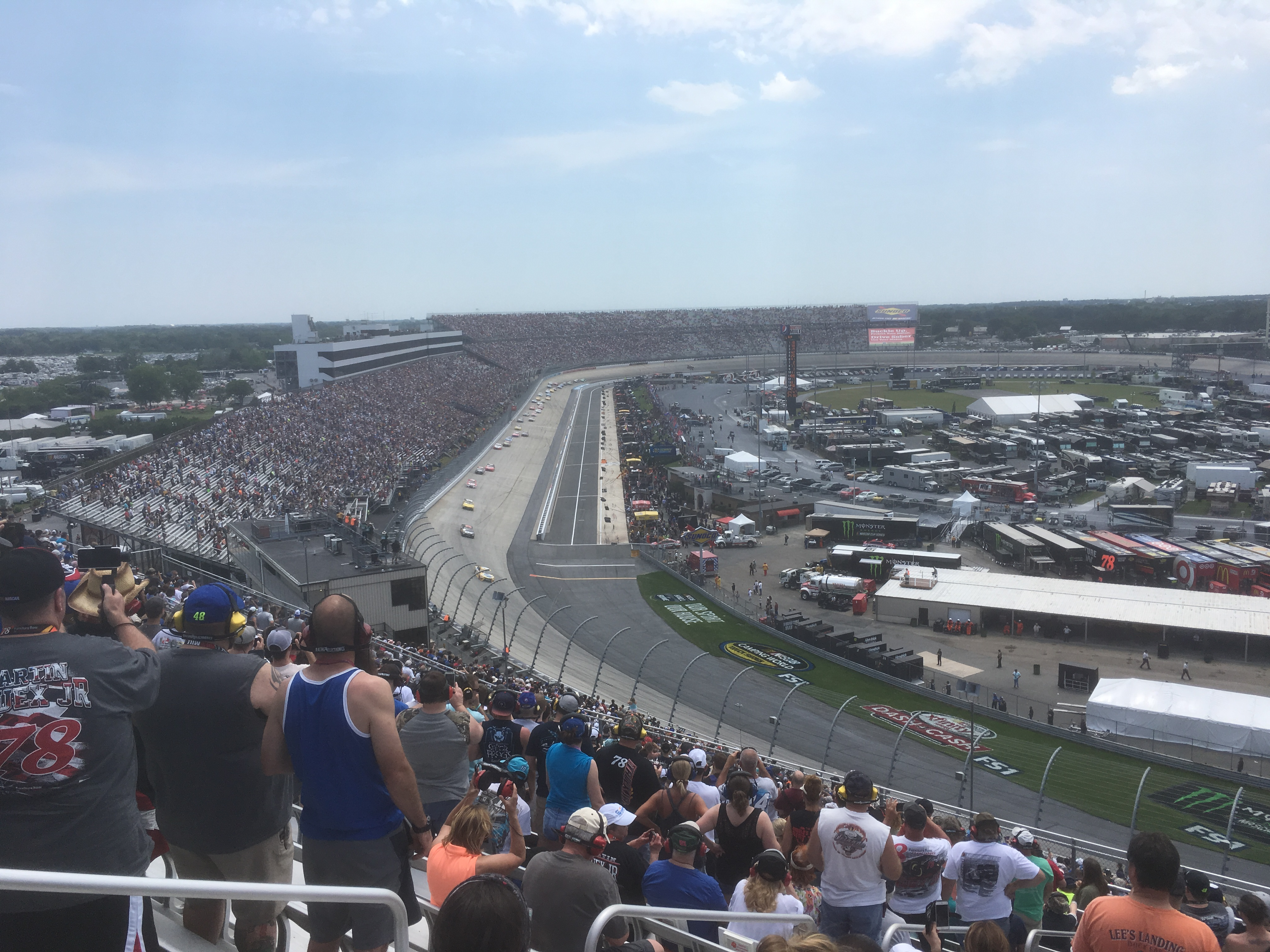
Polesitter Kyle Busch leading early in the AAA 400 Drive for Autism at Dover International Speedway in June.

Kyle Busch started on pole and led early, but had trouble during pit stops. Kurt Busch got loose and crashed into Brad Keselowski, taking Keselowski out for the second straight week and later on Busch would wreck again. The race was dominated between Kyle Larson and Martin Truex Jr. as Truex won both stages and Larson led the most laps. Jimmie Johnson also ran up front, but got into the wall and began to drop back, but was the leader during pit stops when a caution came out. On the ensuing pit stops, Ty Dillon got out before Johnson and led the field to green. Dillon led a lot of laps before being passed for the lead by Larson. Larson was heading to the win, but David Ragan got into the wall. In overtime, Johnson took the lead from Larson and was in front when a caution came out. Johnson got his third win of the year and his 11th career win at Dover. It was also the final time that Johnson reached victory lane in his career. He tied Cale Yarborough in stock car's most all-time winning list with 83 career wins.

Round 14 - Pocono: Axalta presents the Pocono 400

Kyle Busch started on pole for the second straight race. Busch and Erik Jones swapped the lead with Busch winning stage 1. Busch continued to lead, but Kyle Larson had the lead as he won stage 2. Jimmie Johnson and Jamie McMurray were involved in a two car accident near the end of stage 2 and both got into the wall hard and McMurray's car caught fire. Busch continued to lead before he pitted and Brad Keselowski had the lead and was heading to the win until he pitted right before a caution came out. Busch and Keselowski stayed out under the caution and Kyle Busch pulled away until he was passed for the lead by Ryan Blaney. Blaney held off Kevin Harvick to get his first career win and the first win for Wood Brothers Racing since 2011, and the 3rd first time winner of the season.

Round 15 - Michigan: FireKeepers Casino 400

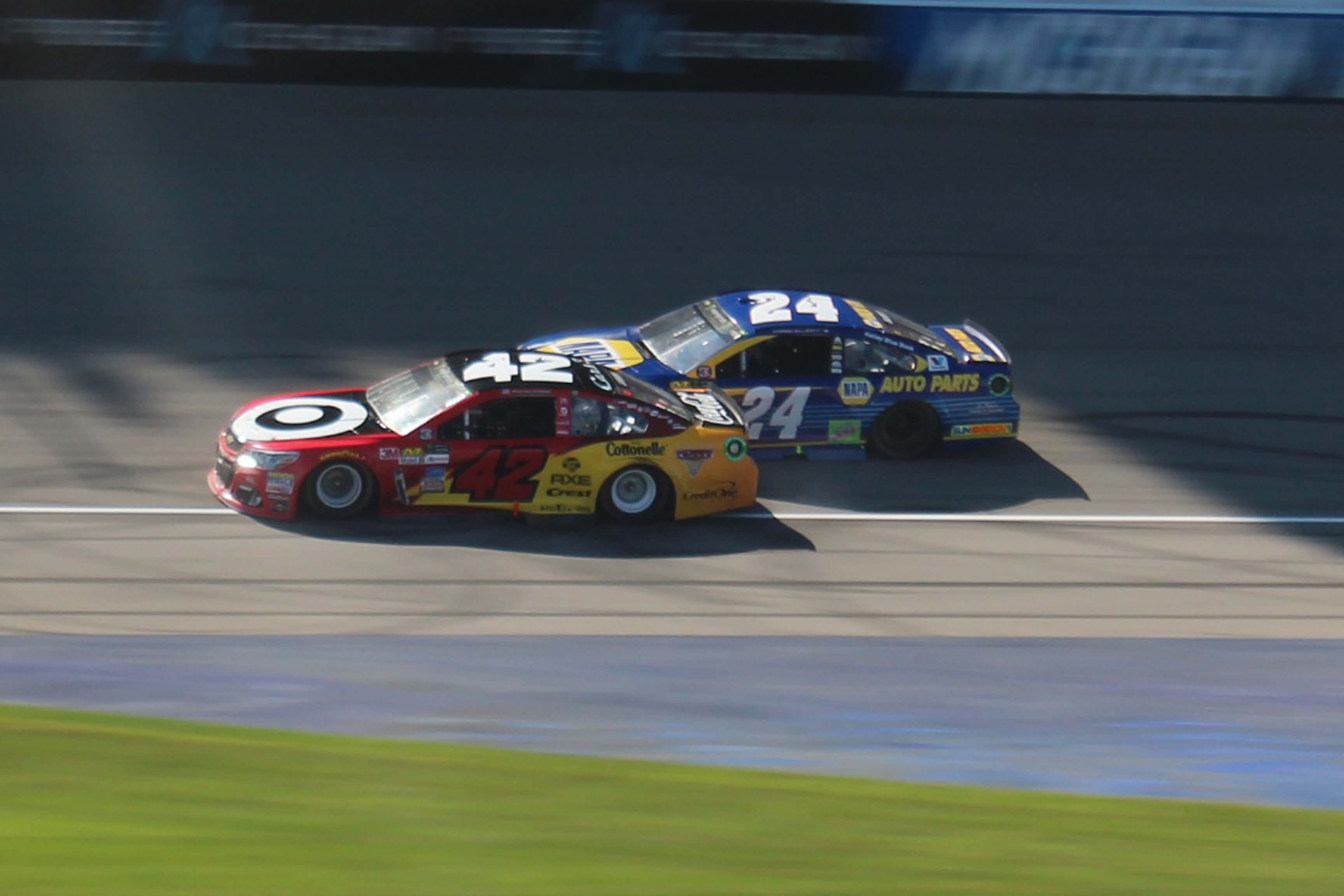
Kyle Larson and Chase Elliott battle for the lead in the later stages of the FireKeepers Casino 400 at Michigan International Speedway.

Kyle Larson started on pole. Larson led early until Martin Truex Jr. got to the lead and won stage one. Larson got back in the lead, but Truex got the lead after pit stops and won stage two. In the final stage, Clint Bowyer got into the wall after having a tire go down. Ryan Blaney had a tire go down and caused a stack up which saw Bubba Wallace get into Daniel Suárez, who crashed into Danica Patrick. On the restart, Larson drove away from Chase Elliott for his second win of the season.

Round 16 - Sonoma: Toyota/Save Mart 350

Kyle Larson started on pole and led early. Dale Earnhardt Jr. spun early and collected Danica Patrick and polesitter Larson. Martin Truex Jr. got by A. J. Allmendinger and won stage one. Danica Patrick was involved in another incident when she spun and collected Ricky Stenhouse Jr. Jimmie Johnson got the lead off the caution and won stage two. In the final stage, both Daniel Suárez and Austin Dillon spun. Brad Keselowski had the lead late until he finally had to pit. Truex began having engine problems and continued to run up front until his engine expired. Kevin Harvick took the lead and held off teammate Clint Bowyer to win under caution after Kasey Kahne crashed into the wall for his first win of the season and his first career Sonoma win.

Round 17 - Daytona: Coke Zero 400

Dale Earnhardt Jr. started on pole for possibly his final Daytona race of his career. Brad Keselowski led most of stage one. Cole Whitt and D. J. Kennington both spun early. Keselowski held off Earnhardt to win stage one. Denny Hamlin led most of stage two. Earnhardt Jr. had a tire go down and got two laps down. Jeffrey Earnhardt's engine expired early, taking him to the garage. The "Big One" happened that took out Joey Logano, Kyle Busch, Austin Dillon and Martin Truex Jr. Matt Kenseth won stage two after passing Hamlin for the lead. On a restart, Chase Elliott spun and collected Trevor Bayne. Kevin Harvick spun and took Earnhardt Jr. out of the race. On the restart, Keselowski got into the wall, costing him from going back-to-back in the July Daytona race. Coming into the closing laps, Kyle Larson, Kurt Busch, and Kenseth got into a multi-car accident that brought out the red flag. On the restart, Erik Jones spun and collected Denny Hamlin, sending the race into overtime. On the restart, Ricky Stenhouse Jr. drove past David Ragan and held off Clint Bowyer for his second win of the season.

Round 18 - Kentucky: Quaker State 400

Kyle Busch started on pole after qualifying was rained out. Busch led early, but Martin Truex Jr. challenged him for the lead a few times and won Stage 1 and Stage 2. Brad Keselowski spun and collected Jimmie Johnson while Kasey Kahne crashed with Trevor Bayne in Stage 2. Truex dominated and led the most laps. With two laps remaining, Kurt Busch blew an engine and spilled oil on the track, sending the race to overtime. On the restart, Truex held of Kyle Larson to win under caution for his third win of the year after Daniel Suárez, Matt Kenseth, and Austin Dillon crashed coming to the white flag.

Round 19 - Loudon: Overton's 301

Martin Truex Jr. started the race on pole after Kyle Larson's qualifying time was disallowed for failing post-qualifying inspection. Erik Jones cut a tire and hit the wall early in the race. Truex Jr. won Stage 1 of the race. In Stage 2, Kyle Busch took the lead and won the stage. Joey Logano had a tire rub and a mechanical problem that sent him to the garage for several laps. Kyle Busch had two pit road speeding penalties late in the race. On the final restart, Denny Hamlin passed Matt Kenseth, who took two tires on the final pit stop while the other leaders took four tires. Hamlin would hold off Kyle Larson to win the race, his first win of the season as well as the first win of the season for Joe Gibbs Racing.

Round 20 - Indianapolis: Brickyard 400

Kyle Busch started on pole. Busch led all of stage one to win after a wreck by Corey LaJoie, a red flag from thunderstorms, and a blown engine by Chase Elliott. Busch continued to dominate and win stage two after a three car wreck with David Ragan, Jeffrey Earnhardt, and J. J. Yeley and a wreck by Dale Earnhardt Jr. On the restart after a caution for a wreck from Ricky Stenhouse Jr., Busch and Martin Truex Jr. got together and crashed, ending their respective days and ending Busch's chances of winning three consecutive Brickyard 400's. Matt Kenseth took the lead and led until he had to pit during green flag stops. Brad Keselowski and Jimmie Johnson stayed out hoping for a caution. With 10 laps to go, Clint Bowyer and Kurt Busch got together and collected Erik Jones and Jamie McMurray. On the restart, Kyle Larson crashed and caught fire. On the next restart, Jimmie Johnson got three wide and got loose and crashed into the wall. There were two more wrecks that featured Ryan Blaney, Trevor Bayne, Michael McDowell, Aric Almirola, and others. On the final restart in overtime, Kasey Kahne took the lead from Keselowski and was leading when another big wreck took place after Kahne had passed the overtime line for his first victory since 2014, and the last one in his Cup Series career.

Round 21 - Pocono: Overton's 400

Kyle Busch started on pole. On the opening lap, Matt Kenseth spun and caused others to spin and took out Aric Almirola. Busch would win Stage 1 after leading most of the laps. In Stage 2, Jimmie Johnson spun after contact with Kasey Kahne. Kyle Larson and Ryan Blaney both had problems. Martin Truex Jr. got to the lead, but pitted before the stage ending. Clint Bowyer took the lead and won Stage 2. Truex and Denny Hamlin battled for the lead, but it was Kyle Busch who was able to take the lead from Kevin Harvick and get his first win of the season and his first career win at Pocono.

Round 22 - Watkins Glen: I Love New York 355 at The Glen

Kyle Busch started on pole for the third consecutive race. Busch dominated to win Stage 1. In Stage 2, Chase Elliott ran up front until he had to pit giving the lead to Daniel Suárez and Suarez was able to hold off Martin Truex Jr. to get his first stage win. On the restart, Kyle Busch and Brad Keselowski got together and spun. Also, Landon Cassill had a tire go down which brought out the caution. Danica Patrick would spin after making contact with Kyle Busch. Even with the incident, Keselowski was able to get out front and was able to take the lead from Truex and pulled away as most of the field was trying to save fuel. With three laps to go, Keselowski had to come in for fuel, handing the lead to Ryan Blaney, but Blaney ran out of fuel on the next lap give them to lead back to Truex. Truex was able to save enough fuel to hold off a hard-charging Matt Kenseth for his fourth win of the season.

Round 23 - Michigan: Pure Michigan 400

Brad Keselowski started on pole and immediately pulled away from the field and led all 60 laps to win stage 1. In stage 2, Keselowski led most of the laps. Martin Truex Jr. had to come in early on pit road for a problem and it ended up helping him stay out when everybody else pitted to get his 15th stage win of the season. On the restart, Kasey Kahne and Daniel Suárez made contact with him both of them into the wall. Multiple drivers including Denny Hamlin and Kyle Busch all tried to stay out to win the race on fuel mileage, but they had to pit when a caution came out after Joey Logano had a tire go down. On the restart, Michael McDowell spun and made contact with Paul Menard which put oil down on the track and put the race under a red flag. After the red flag was lifted in overtime, Kyle Larson zoomed past Truex with fresh tires to take his third win of the season and his third consecutive race at Michigan.

Round 24 - Bristol: Bass Pro Shops NRA Night Race

Erik Jones won his first career pole. Jones started out leading a bunch of laps and battled with Kyle Busch and Kyle Larson at the end of Stage 1. Brad Keselowski and Aric Almirola both had tire problems early and Kyle Busch was able to win Stage 1. In the second stage, Ricky Stenhouse Jr. had a tire go down and Austin Dillon spun and collected Jeffrey Earnhardt. Matt Kenseth, who stayed off pit road, was able to stay out front and win Stage 2. Erik Jones continued leading for most of the third stage, but Kyle Busch was able to get around both Kenseth and Jones and continue to lead and held off the dominant Jones for his second win of the season and also sweeping all three races in a weekend for the second time in his career.

Round 25 - Darlington: Bojangles' Southern 500

Kevin Harvick started on pole. Harvick led early until he lost the lead after the first caution. Kyle Larson, Martin Truex Jr., and Denny Hamlin led the majority of the laps. Clint Bowyer had to exit the race early after mechanical issues. Ricky Stenhouse Jr., Trevor Bayne, A. J. Allmendinger, and others were involved in incidents. Truex was able to win both the stages and had passed Kurt Busch for the lead. In the final stint of the race, Denny Hamlin began closing the gap on the 78 due to fresher tires gained by running longer on his penultimate set (and despite losing time as he missed pit road coming in for his last stop). Hamlin brushed the wall and got into Landon Cassill in the closing laps, but was able to take the lead after Truex had a tire go down, picking up both his second win of the season and his second at Darlington. Despite losing the race after winning both stages, Martin Truex Jr. clinched the 2017 Regular Season Championship after finishing 8th and leaving with a 107-point lead going into the final race. Days later, it was announced that Hamlin's win had been encumbered due to a penalty when it was discovered that the car had a higher rear-end suspension.

Round 26 - Richmond: Federated Auto Parts 400

Matt Kenseth started on pole. Landon Cassill got into the wall and Kenseth led most of Stage 1, but locked up the breaks and brought out a caution. Kyle Busch won Stage 1 by edging out Kyle Larson. Martin Truex Jr. led most of the second stage and won the stage. In the final stage, Danica Patrick spun after contact with Austin Dillon. While under caution, Kenseth got into Clint Bowyer as the field stacked up due to an ambulance at the entry of pit road. Martin Truex Jr. had the lead, but a caution came out with three laps to go after Derrick Cope got into the wall. In overtime, Truex got into the wall after contact with Denny Hamlin. Kyle Larson was able to hold off Joey Logano as the race ended under caution for his fourth win of the season. Chase Elliott, Jamie McMurray, and Kenseth gained the final three playoff spots.

Round 27 - Joliet: Tales of the Turtles 400

Kyle Busch started on pole. Early in Stage 1, Martin Truex Jr., Austin Dillon, Ricky Stenhouse Jr., Matt DiBenedetto, Corey LaJoie, and others got speeding penalties as Busch dominated to win Stage 1. In the second stage, Busch began to fall back after pitting for a loose wheel and getting a penalty. Chase Elliott took the lead from Kevin Harvick and won Stage 2. In the final stage, Jamie McMurray and Erik Jones spun and Martin Truex Jr. was able to get out front and pull away from Chase Elliott for his fifth win of the season and advancing to the "Round of 12."

Round 28 - Loudon: ISM Connect 300

Kyle Busch started on pole for the second consecutive week and led early, but it was Martin Truex Jr. who is able to get by to win stage 1. Coming to the end of the second stage, Truex had the lead, but on the last lap Kevin Harvick got into the wall after contact with Austin Dillon and caused a big cloud of smoke and drivers including Truex, Kurt Busch, Dale Earnhardt Jr. and Jeffrey Earnhardt all had trouble and Kyle Busch was able to sneak through and was credited for the Stage 2 victory. The final stage was mostly dominated by Kyle Busch as a caution would come out for Kasey Kahne after he stopped on the racetrack after receiving a broken track bar. On the restart, David Ragan got into the wall and the caution again came out after Trevor Bayne got into the wall. After the restart, Kyle Busch was able pull away and hold off Kyle Larson for his third win of the season and moving to the next round of the playoffs. Also, Kyle Larson and Brad Keselowski advanced to the next round based on being more than 60 points over the cut line.

Round 29 - Dover: Apache Warrior 400

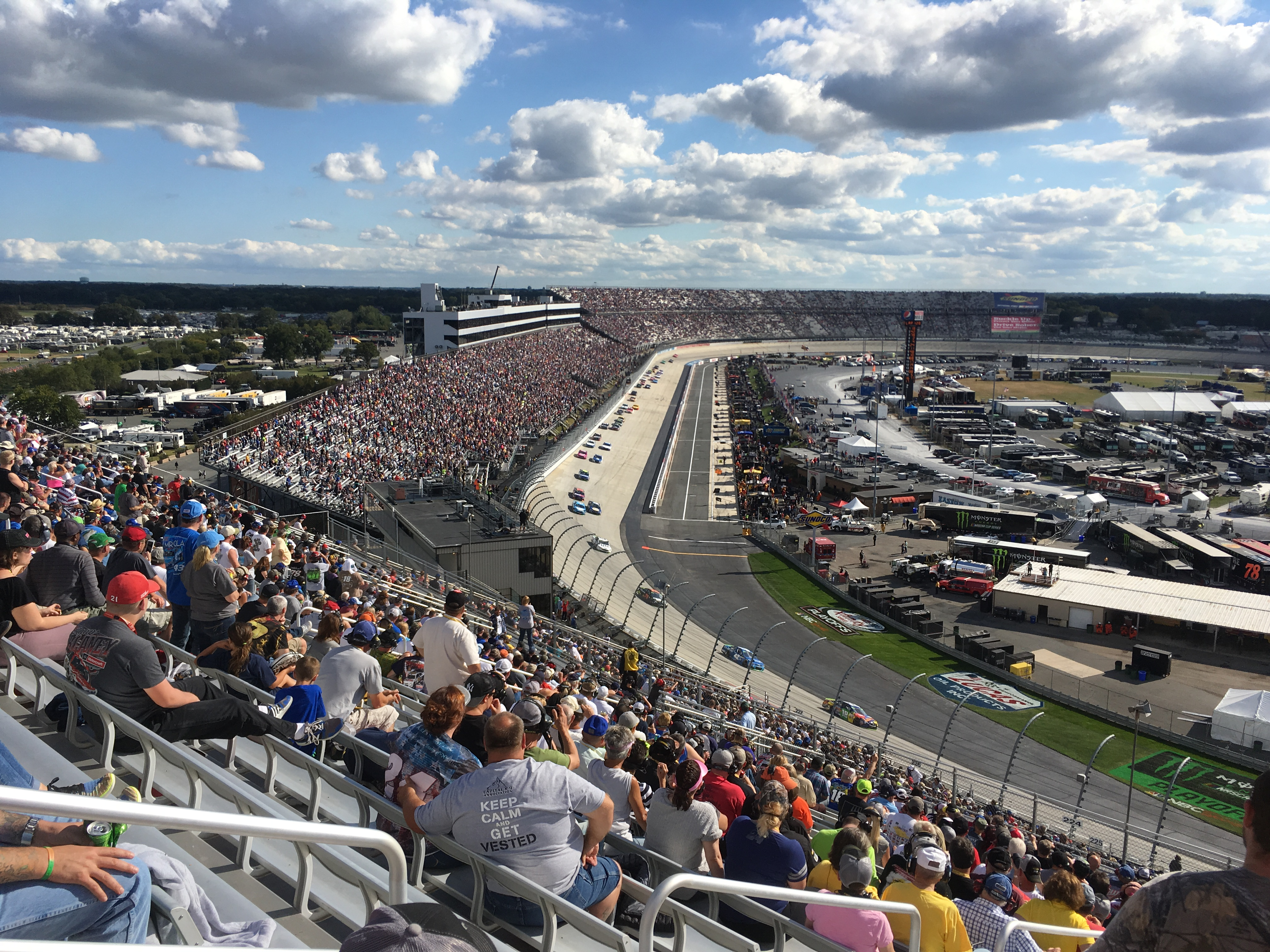
Kyle Busch leading at the beginning of Stage 2 in the Apache Warrior 400 at Dover International Speedway in October, a race he won.

Martin Truex Jr. started on pole. Truex and Kyle Larson traded the lead for most of Stage 1, but after a red flag caused by Jeffrey Earnhardt spinning and hitting the barrels at the entrance to pit road, Brad Keselowski got out front to win the stage. Larson dominated and won the second stage, but had problems that cost him the lead. Chase Elliott took over the lead and dominated the remainder of the race, but Kyle Busch got by Elliott coming to the white flag to score his second consecutive win and his fourth win of the season. Austin Dillon, Kasey Kahne, Ryan Newman, and Kurt Busch were eliminated from the playoffs.

Round 30 - Charlotte: Bank of America 500

Denny Hamlin started on pole. Hamlin led to the competition caution and Kevin Harvick took over. Harvick dominated the race by leading the most laps and winning both stages. A few incidents occurred including Ryan Newman hitting the wall with Clint Bowyer and Joey Logano and Kyle Busch hitting the wall while running near the front. On the final round of green flag pit stops, Martin Truex Jr. got out front. Danica Patrick and David Ragan got together for the caution. On the restart, Kurt Busch got into Kyle Larson, causing an overtime restart. On the restart, teammates A. J. Allmendinger and Chris Buescher wrecked as Truex held off Chase Elliott for his sixth win of the season and advancing to the Round of 8.

Round 31 - Talladega: Alabama 500

Dale Earnhardt Jr. started on pole for his final career Talladega race. Jamie McMurray and Erik Jones got together trying to come to pit road and also collected Jeffrey Earnhardt. Joey Logano led early and dominated the race as teammate Brad Keselowski won the first stage. A wreck happened, but Ryan Blaney was able to win the second stage. In the final stage, there were multiple multicar wrecks that took out several top contenders including Kevin Harvick, Clint Bowyer, Ricky Stenhouse Jr., Kyle Busch, Daniel Suárez, Blaney, Chase Elliott, Kurt Busch, Kyle Larson, Jimmie Johnson, and Martin Truex Jr. On the restart, Keselowski made a last lap pass on Ryan Newman to advance in the "Round of 8" for his third win of the season and fifth at Talladega. Dale Earnhardt Jr. finished his career at Talladega with a seventh-place finish.

Round 32 - Kansas: Hollywood Casino 400

Martin Truex Jr. started on pole. Truex led early, but got a restart violation. Kyle Busch was able to win the first stage as Kyle Larson blew an engine, taking him out of the playoffs. Denny Hamlin won the second stage on a one lap restart. Jimmie Johnson spun twice, but was able to recover. There was a big wreck that took out Erik Jones, Jamie McMurray, Clint Bowyer, Daniel Suárez, Matt Kenseth, and others. Kenseth was disqualified for having too many crew members working on his car after the wreck, taking him out of the playoffs. Martin Truex Jr. was able to regain the lead and held off Kurt Busch for his seventh win of the season. McMurray, Ricky Stenhouse Jr., Kenseth, and Larson were eliminated from the playoffs.

Round 33 - Martinsville: First Data 500

Joey Logano started on pole. Logano led early as there was spins from Ricky Stenhouse Jr., Ty Dillon, David Ragan, and A. J. Allmendinger. Brad Keselowski was able to win Stage 1 and won Stage 2 after battling with Kyle Busch. Kyle Larson got into the wall, taking him out for the second consecutive race. Chase Elliott was out front for the majority of the last 120 laps. Towards the end, Logano spun after having a flat tire after a collision with Kyle Busch. On the restart, Keselowski was leading, but Elliott moved Keselowski up the track to take the lead with 4 laps to go. Elliott was leading with less than 3 laps to go, but spun coming to 2 laps to go after contact with Denny Hamlin, sending the race to overtime. On the restart, Kyle Busch moved Hamlin up the track coming to the white flag to take the lead. Ryan Blaney got into Hamlin as they battled for 3rd and 4th in the final corner and both spun and caused a huge pile-up behind Kyle Busch who edged Martin Truex Jr. for his fifth win of the season and second at Martinsville to punch his ticket to the "Championship 4" for α third consecutive year.

Round 34 - Texas: AAA Texas 500

Kurt Busch won the pole with a new track record. Kyle Busch and Brad Keselowski made contact early, cutting the tire of Keselowski's car and causing damage to Busch's car. Denny Hamlin and others led early as Kevin Harvick won the first stage. Kyle Larson dominated the second stage to win. During the final stage, Daniel Suárez spun after contact with Kasey Kahne. Dale Earnhardt Jr. was running well in his final Texas race until he suffered a broken hub and went to the garage. Larson made heavy contact with the wall, bringing out a red flag forseveral minutes. On the restart, Martin Truex Jr. took the lead from Hamlin, but ran into problems late in the race. Kevin Harvick took the lead from Truex and led the final nine laps for his second win of the season and first career win at Texas to clinch a "Championship 4" spot, while Truex Jr. clinched a spot based on points.

Round 35 - Phoenix: Can-Am 500

Ryan Blaney started on pole. Kyle Larson managed to pass Blaney to win Stage 1, though engine problems forced Larson out of the race for the fourth consecutive time. Jimmie Johnson blew a tire, causing severe damage to his car and forcing him out of the playoffs. Denny Hamlin took the lead and dominated the second stage, leading the most laps and winning Stage 2. Hamlin stayed out front for most of the first half of Stage 3, before having a problem on pit road which dropped him to 2nd behind Matt Kenseth. Playoff drivers Hamlin and Chase Elliott were racing for the final spot in the "Championship 4" late when Elliott – still bitter over their altercation at Martinsville 2 weeks previously – drove Hamlin up the track and put him into the wall. Hamlin had a tire go down because of this contact and got into the wall, ending his Championship hopes. Elliot led into the closing laps, but was passed by Kenseth. Kenseth held off Elliott for his first win of the season, second at Phoenix, and final career win. Brad Keselowski clinched the final Championship 4 spot as Denny Hamlin, Ryan Blaney, Chase Elliott, and Jimmie Johnson were eliminated from the playoffs.

Round 36 - Homestead: Ford EcoBoost 400

Denny Hamlin started on pole. Kyle Larson dominated the race, leading the most laps and winning both stages. Joey Gase got into the wall and Danica Patrick, in her final full-time Cup race, crashed along with Kasey Kahne. Martin Truex Jr. dominated the second half of the race and held off Kyle Busch for his eighth win of the season and won his first MENCS championship. Dale Earnhardt Jr., in his final Cup start, finished 25th.

== Results and standings ==
=== Race results ===
No.	Race	Pole position	Most laps led	Winning driver	Manufacturer	Report
	Advance Auto Parts Clash	Brad Keselowski	Denny Hamlin	Joey Logano	Ford	Report
	Can-Am Duel 1	Chase Elliott	Brad Keselowski	Chase Elliott	Chevrolet	Report
	Can-Am Duel 2	Dale Earnhardt Jr.	Dale Earnhardt Jr.	Denny Hamlin	Toyota	Report
1	Daytona 500	Chase Elliott	Kevin Harvick	Kurt Busch	Ford	Report
2	Folds of Honor QuikTrip 500	Kevin Harvick	Kevin Harvick	Brad Keselowski	Ford	Report
3	Kobalt 400	Brad Keselowski	Martin Truex Jr.	Martin Truex Jr.	Toyota	Report
4	Camping World 500	Joey Logano	Kyle Busch	Ryan Newman	Chevrolet	Report
5	Auto Club 400	Kyle Larson	Kyle Larson	Kyle Larson	Chevrolet	Report
6	STP 500	Kyle Larson	Kyle Busch	Brad Keselowski	Ford	Report
7	O'Reilly Auto Parts 500	Kevin Harvick	Ryan Blaney	Jimmie Johnson	Chevrolet	Report
8	Food City 500	Kyle Larson	Kyle Larson	Jimmie Johnson	Chevrolet	Report
9	Toyota Owners 400	Matt Kenseth	Matt Kenseth	Joey Logano	Ford	Report
10	GEICO 500	Ricky Stenhouse Jr.	Kyle Busch	Ricky Stenhouse Jr.	Ford	Report
11	Go Bowling 400	Ryan Blaney	Martin Truex Jr.	Martin Truex Jr.	Toyota	Report
	Monster Energy Open	Clint Bowyer	Clint Bowyer; Ryan Blaney	Daniel Suárez	Toyota	Report
	Monster Energy NASCAR All-Star Race	Kyle Larson	Kyle Larson	Kyle Busch	Toyota	Report
12	Coca-Cola 600	Kevin Harvick	Martin Truex Jr.	Austin Dillon	Chevrolet	Report
13	AAA 400 Drive for Autism	Kyle Busch	Kyle Larson	Jimmie Johnson	Chevrolet	Report
14	Axalta presents the Pocono 400	Kyle Busch	Kyle Busch	Ryan Blaney	Ford	Report
15	FireKeepers Casino 400	Kyle Larson	Kyle Larson	Kyle Larson	Chevrolet	Report
16	Toyota/Save Mart 350	Kyle Larson	Martin Truex Jr.	Kevin Harvick	Ford	Report
17	Coke Zero 400	Dale Earnhardt Jr.	Brad Keselowski	Ricky Stenhouse Jr.	Ford	Report
18	Quaker State 400	Kyle Busch	Martin Truex Jr.	Martin Truex Jr.	Toyota	Report
19	Overton's 301	Martin Truex Jr.	Martin Truex Jr.	Denny Hamlin	Toyota	Report
20	Brantley Gilbert Big Machine Brickyard 400	Kyle Busch	Kyle Busch	Kasey Kahne	Chevrolet	Report
21	Overton's 400	Kyle Busch	Kyle Busch	Kyle Busch	Toyota	Report
22	I Love New York 355 at The Glen	Kyle Busch	Martin Truex Jr.	Martin Truex Jr.	Toyota	Report
23	Pure Michigan 400	Brad Keselowski	Brad Keselowski	Kyle Larson	Chevrolet	Report
24	Bass Pro Shops NRA Night Race	Erik Jones	Erik Jones	Kyle Busch	Toyota	Report
25	Bojangles' Southern 500	Kevin Harvick	Kyle Larson; Denny Hamlin	Denny Hamlin	Toyota	Report
26	Federated Auto Parts 400	Matt Kenseth	Martin Truex Jr.	Kyle Larson	Chevrolet	Report
Monster Energy NASCAR Cup Series Playoffs
Round of 16
27	Tales of the Turtles 400	Kyle Busch	Kyle Busch	Martin Truex Jr.	Toyota	Report
28	ISM Connect 300	Kyle Busch	Kyle Busch	Kyle Busch	Toyota	Report
29	Apache Warrior 400	Martin Truex Jr.	Chase Elliott	Kyle Busch	Toyota	Report
Round of 12
30	Bank of America 500	Denny Hamlin	Kevin Harvick	Martin Truex Jr.	Toyota	Report
31	Alabama 500	Dale Earnhardt Jr.	Joey Logano	Brad Keselowski	Ford	Report
32	Hollywood Casino 400	Martin Truex Jr.	Kyle Busch	Martin Truex Jr.	Toyota	Report
Round of 8
33	First Data 500	Joey Logano	Kyle Busch	Kyle Busch	Toyota	Report
34	AAA Texas 500	Kurt Busch	Martin Truex Jr.	Kevin Harvick	Ford	Report
35	Can-Am 500	Ryan Blaney	Denny Hamlin	Matt Kenseth	Toyota	Report
Championship 4
36	Ford EcoBoost 400	Denny Hamlin	Kyle Larson	Martin Truex Jr.	Toyota	Report

=== Drivers' Championship ===
(key) Bold – Pole position awarded by time. Italics – Pole position set by final practice results or owner's points. * – Most laps led. ^{1} – Stage 1 winner. ^{2} – Stage 2 winner. ^{3} – Stage 3 winner. (Note: Stage 3 Winner only for Coca-Cola 600.) ^{1–10} - Regular season top 10 finishers.

Eliminated after Round of 16
Eliminated after Round of 12
Eliminated after Round of 8

Pos.	Driver	DAY			ATL	LVS	PHO	CAL	MAR	TEX	BRI	RCH	TAL	KAN	CLT	DOV	POC	MCH	SON	DAY	KEN	NHA	IND	POC	GLN	MCH	BRI	DAR	RCH	CHI	NHA	DOV	CLT	TAL	KAN	MAR	TEX	PHO	HOM	Pts.	Stage	Bonus
Pos.	Driver	D1	D2	500	ATL	LVS	PHO	CAL	MAR	TEX	BRI	RCH	TAL	KAN	CLT	DOV	POC	MCH	SON	DAY	KEN	NHA	IND	POC	GLN	MCH	BRI	DAR	RCH	CHI	NHA	DOV	CLT	TAL	KAN	MAR	TEX	PHO	HOM	Pts.	Stage	Bonus
1	Martin Truex Jr.	7^{‡}		13	8	1*^{12}	11	4^{2}	16^{1}	8	8^{2}	10	35	1*	3*^{2}	3^{12}	6	6^{12}	37*^{1}	34	1*^{12}	**3***^{1}	33	3	1*	2^{2}	21	8^{12}	20*^{2}	1	5^{1}	**4**	1	23	**1**	2	2*	3	1	5040	–	69^{1}
2	Kyle Busch	12		38^{1}	16	22	3*	8	2*	15	35	16	3*	5^{1}	2^{1}	**16**	**9***^{1}	7	5	20	**5**	12^{2}	**34***^{12}	**1***^{1}	**7**^{1}	10	1^{1}	2	9^{1}	**15***^{1}	**1***^{2}	1	29	27	10*^{1}	1*	19	7	2	5035	–	42^{2}
3	Kevin Harvick	3		22*^{2}	**9***^{12}	38	6	13	20	**4**	3	5	23	3	**8**	9	2	14	1	33	9	5	6	2	17	13	8	**9**	15	3	36	17	3*^{12}	20	8	5	1^{1}	5	4	5033	–	17^{4}
4	Brad Keselowski	4*		27	1	**5**	5	2	1	6	34	2^{2}	7^{1}	2	39	38	5	16	3	31*^{1}	39	9	2	5	15	**17***^{1}	29	15	11	6	4	10^{1}	15	1^{1}	13	4^{12}	5	16	7	5030	–	26^{6}
Monster Energy NASCAR Cup Series Playoffs cut-off
Pos.	Driver	DAY			ATL	LVS	PHO	CAL	MAR	TEX	BRI	RCH	TAL	KAN	CLT	DOV	POC	MCH	SON	DAY	KEN	NHA	IND	POC	GLN	MCH	BRI	DAR	RCH	CHI	NHA	DOV	CLT	TAL	KAN	MAR	TEX	PHO	HOM	Pts.	Stage	Bonus
Pos.	Driver	D1	D2	500	ATL	LVS	PHO	CAL	MAR	TEX	BRI	RCH	TAL	KAN	CLT	DOV	POC	MCH	SON	DAY	KEN	NHA	IND	POC	GLN	MCH	BRI	DAR	RCH	CHI	NHA	DOV	CLT	TAL	KAN	MAR	TEX	PHO	HOM	Pts.	Stage	Bonus
5	Chase Elliott	**1**		**14**	5	3	12^{2}	10	3^{2}	9	7	24	30	29	38	5	8	2	8	22	3	11	39	10	13	8	18	11	10	2^{2}	11	2*	2	16	4	27	8	2	5	2377	95	6^{7}
6	Denny Hamlin		1	17	38	6	10	14	30	25	10	3	11^{2}	23	5^{3}	8	12	4	4	24	4	1	17	4	4	16	3	1*	5	4	12	35	**4**	6	5^{2}	7	3	35*^{2}	**9**	2353	89	33^{5}
7	Matt Kenseth	5		40	3	9	37	36	9	16	4	**23***^{1}	24	12	4	12	10	11	20	27^{2}	17	4	5	9	2	24	4^{2}	6	**38**	9	3	11	11	14	37	9	4	1	8	2344	71	5^{8}
8	Kyle Larson		9	12	2	2	2	**1***^{1}	17	2	6*^{1}	14	12	6	33	2*	7^{2}	**1***	**26**	29	2	2	28	33	23	1	9	14*	1	5	2	5^{2}	10	13	39	37	37^{2}	40^{1}	3*^{12}	2320	98	34^{3}
9	Ryan Blaney		20	2	18	7	23	9	25	12*^{12}	33	36	39	**4**^{2}	24	32	1	25	9	26	10	19	23	30	8	15	10	31	18	11	9	23	8	18^{2}	3	8	6	**17**	29	2305	58	9
10	Jimmie Johnson		13	34	19	11	9	21	15	1	1	11	8	24	17	1	36	10	13^{2}	12	40	10	27	35	29	19	11	12	8	8	14	3	7	24	11	12	27	39	27	2260	42	17^{10}
11	Austin Dillon		5	19	32	25	18	11	5	33	13	20	36	16	1	13	13	27	18	36	19	15	21	21	26	7	39	4	21	16	19	16	16	29	14	13	13	14	11	2224	10	5
12	Jamie McMurray	2		28	10	8	15	6	38	7	12	6	2	8	12	7	37	5	10	14	7	17	15	26	14	9	12	10	14	10	16	9	5	37	34	29	18	6	13	2224	27	3^{9}
13	Ricky Stenhouse Jr.	13		31	13	33	4	22	10	14	9	4	**1**	11	15	39	11	8	38	1	14	14	35	16	20	18	14	29	19	25	15	19	13	26	29	10	12	8	15	2222	14	10
14	Kurt Busch		3	1	7	30	25	24	37	10	25	8	6	19	6	37	4	12	7	28	30	8	29	13	6	11	5	3	4	19	37	20	22	25	2	22	**9**	21	22	2217	40	5
15	Kasey Kahne		14	7	4	12	20	20	14	38	20	22	5	15	35	17	35	21	24	18	38	28	1	11	16	38	24	24	12	21	35	14	9	8	15	16	11	19	33	2198	4	5
16	Ryan Newman		8	21	35	17	1	15	8	26	14	7	25	40	9	4	14	15	15	5	22	27	3	14	25	4	6	7	3	23	13	13	40	2	33	14	20	20	10	2196	5	5
17	Joey Logano	9		6	6	4	**31**^{1}	5	4	3	5	1	32	37	21	25	23	3	12	35	8	37	4	27	24	28	13	18	2	7	10	15	26	4*	21	**24**	7	12	6	930	160	1
18	Clint Bowyer		2	32	11	10	13	3	7	11	2	15	14	9	14	31	17	26	2	2	13	7	30	6^{2}	5	23	19	40	24	13	7	6	27	35	19	3	36	13	12	871	93	1
19	Erik Jones **(R)**		19	39	14	15	8	12	12	22	17	38	33	22	7	15	3	13	25	9	6	39	31	8	10	3	**2***	5	6	33	6	12	17	36	35	26	10	4	21	863	162	–
20	Daniel Suárez **(R)**	11		29	21	20	7	7	32	19	18	12	19	7	11	6	15	24	16	17	18	6	7	7	3^{2}	37	15	38	7	12	8	8	6	15	36	15	14	18	34	777	25	1
21	Dale Earnhardt Jr.		**6***	37	30	16	14	16	34	5	38	30	22	20	10	11	38	9	6	**32**	12	18	36	12	37	14	23	22	13	17	34	7	12	**7**	7	11	35	10	25	668	44	–
22	Trevor Bayne	6		10	12	13	19	23	13	13	11	13	37	10	16	21	21	17	27	23	37	20	20	20	35	5	7	35	25	22	24	24	14	3	20	6	28	38	19	660	20	–
23	Paul Menard	20		5	25	19	21	28	19	36	16	25	9	35	13	33	20	22	11	3	21	22	16	19	18	34	16	16	28	14	20	26	19	12	12	20	23	15	16	631	6	–
24	Ty Dillon **(R)**		10	30	15	21	16	18	22	17	15	26	13	14	36	14	18	20	28	16	33	16	19	17	19	21	36	13	22	28	22	22	21	11	16	30	24	11	26	593	5	–
25	Chris Buescher	16		35	24	23	27	25	11	21	39	17	15	18	20	23	19	36	19	10	16	25	9	28	11	6	27	17	32	27	21	30	18	17	6	21	22	37	20	564	–	–
26	Michael McDowell		12	15	29	18	24	33	26	23	26	29	34	13	19	19	24	23	14	4	23	26	18	18	12	27	20	19	16	30	23	27	35	30	18	19	21	22	24	542	11	–
27	A. J. Allmendinger		4^{‡}	3	26	24	26	17	6	20	30	37	31	30	18	18	22	18	35	8	20	21	10	23	9	20	22	34	26	26	17	28	20	22	32	40	16	23	14	531	21	–
28	Danica Patrick		7	33	17	36	22	26	23	24	36	18	38	36	25	10	16	37	17	25	15	13	11	15	22	22	25	26	23	18	18	18	38	21	38	17	17	25	37	511	24	–
29	Aric Almirola	8		4	27	14	17	19	18	18	22	9	4	38								24	13	38	21	12	37	20	17	24	26	25	24	5	9	18	15	9	18	502	–	–
30	David Ragan		11	25	23	29	35	31	24	28	23	19	10	17	23	30	25	29	31	6	24	29	38	22	27	30	17	25	27	29	29	21	37	10	17	28	30	33	17	447	9	–
31	Landon Cassill	15		16	22	27	28	27	27	29	32	21	29	21	28	36	27	32	30	19	26	23	22	29	36	25	35	21	39	20	25	29	25	28	23	23	26	24	23	382	–	–
32	Matt DiBenedetto	14		9	28	26	29	29	35	31	19	28	18	32	37	29	32	28	23	13	25	30	8	37	28	26	26	27	31	31	31	31	23	31	22	39	25	27	30	363	–	–
33	Cole Whitt	10		18	20	28	34	32	21	30	21	27	16	26	34	22	30	31	21	39	34	38	12	24	34	29	33	23	33	35	30	32	34	34	24	25	29	36	28	322	–	–
34	Gray Gaulding **(R)**				37	34	36	37	29	34	29	31	20	34	27	24	29				35	35	24	31			31	36	35	38	33		36	9	28	31	40	Wth		164	–	–
35	Reed Sorenson	21		DNQ	31	31	30	34	31	35	28	33	40	25	30		31	34		30	28	34				33	38	39	30	32	28	39	31		25	32	31		35	150	–	–
36	Jeffrey Earnhardt		18	26	33	32	39	39	36	40	27	35	28	33	40	27	34	35		37	29	33	26	36		35	40	30	33	34	38	37	30	38	26	38	33	29	32	145	–	–
37	Derrike Cope				36	35	33	38		37	31			39	31		33							34		39		32	36			Wth			40			32		42	–	–
38	Michael Waltrip		17	8																																				29	–	–
39	D. J. Kennington		15	36									DNQ							38														33				26		17	–	–
40	Billy Johnson																		22																					15	–	–
41	Boris Said																		29						30															15	–	–
42	Gary Klutt																								31															6	–	–
43	Cody Ware				39											35	39											37			39									6	–	–
44	Alon Day																		32																					5	–	–
45	Kyle Weatherman																																			35		34		5	–	–
46	Kevin O'Connell																		33																					4	–	–
47	Tommy Regan																		34																					3	–	–
48	Hermie Sadler																																			34				3	–	–
Ineligible for Monster Energy NASCAR Cup driver points
Pos.	Driver	DAY			ATL	LVS	PHO	CAL	MAR	TEX	BRI	RCH	TAL	KAN	CLT	DOV	POC	MCH	SON	DAY	KEN	NHA	IND	POC	GLN	MCH	BRI	DAR	RCH	CHI	NHA	DOV	CLT	TAL	KAN	MAR	TEX	PHO	HOM	Pts.	Stage	Bonus
Pos.	Driver	D1	D2	500	ATL	LVS	PHO	CAL	MAR	TEX	BRI	RCH	TAL	KAN	CLT	DOV	POC	MCH	SON	DAY	KEN	NHA	IND	POC	GLN	MCH	BRI	DAR	RCH	CHI	NHA	DOV	CLT	TAL	KAN	MAR	TEX	PHO	HOM	Pts.	Stage	Bonus
49	Brendan Gaughan	19		11									26							7														19								
50	Bubba Wallace																26	19		15	11																					
51	Corey LaJoie	18		24	34	39	38	30	28	32	24	32	27	27	32		28	30		11		31	40	25	33	31	28	28	29	36	27	34	28		27	33	39	31	31			
52	Timmy Hill		21	DNQ		37	32	35	33	39	37	34	Wth	28	29	28					31		14				DNQ			39		40	33									
53	Elliott Sadler		16	20									17							21																						
54	Ross Chastain															20																38							Wth			
55	Joey Gase	17		23									21								36		25				34							32			32	30	39			
56	Regan Smith														22	34																										
57	Ryan Sieg															26		33		40	27	32	Wth																			
58	J. J. Yeley									27					26								37				30															
59	David Starr																																				38	28	36			
60	B. J. McLeod																				32		32			36	32		37			36	32		30							
61	Brett Moffitt																								32	32				37	32	33	39		31							
62	Carl Long													31														33							Wth	36						
63	Stephen Leicht																							32																		
64	Ray Black Jr.																													40							34		38			
65	Josh Bilicki																		36			36																				
66	Mark Thompson																																	39								
67	Justin Marks																																	40								
	Daniel Hemric																																				QL					
^{‡} – Allmendinger and Truex lost their Duel points for failing post-race inspection.

=== Manufacturers' Championship ===
Pos	Manufacturer	Wins	Points
1	**Toyota**	**16**	1292
2	Ford	10	1254
3	Chevrolet	10	1247

=== Contingency Awards ===
Award	Recipient
3M Hard Charger Award	Kasey Kahne (Segment 1); Aric Almirola (Segment 2)
American Ethanol Green Flag Restart Award	Kyle Larson
Coors Light Pole Award	Kyle Busch
Ingersoll Rand Power Move Award	Daniel Suárez
MAHLE Engine Builder Award	Toyota Racing Development
Mechanix Wear Most Valuable Pit Crew	#19 Joe Gibbs Racing (Q1) #22 Team Penske (Q2)
MOOG Go the Extra Mile Award	Tony Gibson
Sherwin-Williams Fastest Lap Award	Kyle Busch
NASCAR Rookie of the Year	Erik Jones
Most Popular Driver	Dale Earnhardt Jr.
Mobil 1 Driver of the Year	Kyle Larson

== See also ==
- 2017 NASCAR Xfinity Series
- 2017 NASCAR Camping World Truck Series
- 2017 NASCAR K&N Pro Series East
- 2017 NASCAR K&N Pro Series West
- 2017 NASCAR Whelen Modified Tour
- 2017 NASCAR Pinty's Series
- 2017 NASCAR PEAK Mexico Series
- 2017 NASCAR Whelen Euro Series

== Notes ==
- ^1 The Advance Auto Parts Clash at Daytona was postponed from February 18 to February 19 because of inclement weather.
- ^2 The Food City 500 was postponed from April 23 to April 24 because of inclement weather.
