= 2017 Advance Auto Parts Clash =

Motor car race in Florida, U.S.

Race details
- Race 1 of 2 exhibition races in the 2017 Monster Energy NASCAR Cup Series
- Date: February 19, 2017
- Location: Daytona International Speedway in Daytona Beach, Florida
- Course: Permanent racing facility
- Course length: 2.5 miles (4 km)
- Distance: 75 laps, 187.5 mi (300 km)
- Average speed: 143.831 mph (231.474 km/h)

Pole position
| Driver | Brad Keselowski | Team Penske |

Most laps led
| Driver | Denny Hamlin | Joe Gibbs Racing |
- Laps: 48

Winner
| No. 22 | Joey Logano | Team Penske |

Television in the United States
- Network: FS1
- Announcers: Mike Joy, Jeff Gordon, Darrell Waltrip and Dale Earnhardt Jr.

Radio in the United States
- Radio: MRN
- Booth announcers: Joe Moore, Jeff Striegle and Rusty Wallace
- Turn announcers: Dave Moody (1 & 2), Mike Bagley (Backstretch) and Kyle Rickey (3 & 4)

The 2017 Advance Auto Parts Clash was a Monster Energy NASCAR Cup Series race at Daytona International Speedway in Daytona Beach, Florida. The race was to be held on February 18, 2017 but was postponed to the following day because of rain. Contested over 75 laps, it was the first exhibition race of the 2017 Monster Energy NASCAR Cup Series season.

== Report ==
=== Format and eligibility ===
The race is 75 laps in length, and is divided into two segments; the first is 25 laps and the second is 50 laps. The race is open to those drivers who won a pole in the 2016 season or had won "The Clash" previously.

The 2017 Clash at Daytona will not be a predetermined number of cars; rather, the field is limited to drivers who meet more exclusive criteria. Only drivers who were 2016 Pole Award winners, former Clash race winners, former Daytona 500 pole winners who competed full–time in 2016 and drivers who qualified for the 2016 Chase are eligible. Daniel Suarez was also allowed to race, as Joe Gibbs Racing already had a car prepared for Carl Edwards who surprisingly retired less than a month before the race.

== Entry list ==
| No. | Driver | Team | Manufacturer |
|---|---|---|---|
| 1 | Jamie McMurray | Chip Ganassi Racing | Chevrolet |
| 2 | Brad Keselowski | Team Penske | Ford |
| 3 | Austin Dillon | Richard Childress Racing | Chevrolet |
| 4 | Kevin Harvick | Stewart–Haas Racing | Ford |
| 10 | Danica Patrick | Stewart–Haas Racing | Ford |
| 11 | Denny Hamlin | Joe Gibbs Racing | Toyota |
| 18 | Kyle Busch | Joe Gibbs Racing | Toyota |
| 19 | Daniel Suárez (R) | Joe Gibbs Racing | Toyota |
| 20 | Matt Kenseth | Joe Gibbs Racing | Toyota |
| 22 | Joey Logano | Team Penske | Ford |
| 24 | Chase Elliott | Hendrick Motorsports | Chevrolet |
| 37 | Chris Buescher | JTG Daugherty Racing | Chevrolet |
| 41 | Kurt Busch | Stewart–Haas Racing | Ford |
| 42 | Kyle Larson | Chip Ganassi Racing | Chevrolet |
| 48 | Jimmie Johnson | Hendrick Motorsports | Chevrolet |
| 78 | Martin Truex Jr. | Furniture Row Racing | Toyota |
| 88 | Alex Bowman | Hendrick Motorsports | Chevrolet |
Official entry list

== Starting lineup ==
| Pos | No | Driver | Team | Manufacturer |
|---|---|---|---|---|
| 1 | 2 | Brad Keselowski | Team Penske | Ford |
| 2 | 11 | Denny Hamlin | Joe Gibbs Racing | Toyota |
| 3 | 1 | Jamie McMurray | Chip Ganassi Racing | Chevrolet |
| 4 | 3 | Austin Dillon | Richard Childress Racing | Chevrolet |
| 5 | 78 | Martin Truex Jr. | Furniture Row Racing | Toyota |
| 6 | 48 | Jimmie Johnson | Hendrick Motorsports | Chevrolet |
| 7 | 4 | Kevin Harvick | Stewart–Haas Racing | Ford |
| 8 | 88 | Alex Bowman | Hendrick Motorsports | Chevrolet |
| 9 | 22 | Joey Logano | Team Penske | Ford |
| 10 | 41 | Kurt Busch | Stewart–Haas Racing | Ford |
| 11 | 42 | Kyle Larson | Chip Ganassi Racing | Chevrolet |
| 12 | 10 | Danica Patrick | Stewart–Haas Racing | Ford |
| 13 | 18 | Kyle Busch | Joe Gibbs Racing | Toyota |
| 14 | 24 | Chase Elliott | Hendrick Motorsports | Chevrolet |
| 15 | 20 | Matt Kenseth | Joe Gibbs Racing | Toyota |
| 16 | 19 | Daniel Suárez (R) | Joe Gibbs Racing | Toyota |
| 17 | 37 | Chris Buescher | JTG Daugherty Racing | Chevrolet |
Official starting lineup

== Practice ==
=== First practice ===
Brad Keselowski was the fastest in the first practice session with a time of 46.972 and a speed of 191.604 mph (308.357 km/h).

| Pos | No | Driver | Team | Manufacturer | Time | Speed |
|---|---|---|---|---|---|---|
| 1 | 2 | Brad Keselowski | Team Penske | Ford | 46.972 | 191.604 |
| 2 | 42 | Kyle Larson | Chip Ganassi Racing | Chevrolet | 47.013 | 191.436 |
| 3 | 22 | Joey Logano | Team Penske | Ford | 47.034 | 191.351 |
Official first practice results

=== Final practice ===
Denny Hamlin was the fastest in the final practice session with a time of 45.795 and a speed of 196.528 mph (316.281 km/h).

| Pos | No | Driver | Team | Manufacturer | Time | Speed |
|---|---|---|---|---|---|---|
| 1 | 11 | Denny Hamlin | Joe Gibbs Racing | Toyota | 45.795 | 196.528 |
| 2 | 19 | Daniel Suárez (R) | Joe Gibbs Racing | Toyota | 45.853 | 196.279 |
| 3 | 18 | Kyle Busch | Joe Gibbs Racing | Toyota | 45.860 | 196.249 |
Official final practice results

== Race ==
=== Segment 1 ===
Brad Keselowski led the field to the green flag at 11:35 a.m. under mostly sunny skies, after it was postponed from the night before. The field wasted little time packing together to form multiple lines of three-wide racing. Chris Buescher found himself out to dry as he lost the draft early on. Denny Hamlin drove to the outside of Keselowski in Turn 1 to challenge for the lead on the eighth lap. Keselowski powered back ahead, but Hamlin worked his way to the lead on lap 10. Martin Truex Jr. brushed the wall exiting Turn 4 on lap 11. The first caution of the race flew on lap 17 for a single-car wreck on the frontstretch. Exiting Turn 4, Jimmie Johnson's car broke loose, turned down and hooked the right-rear of Kurt Busch's car into the outside wall and the tri-oval grass. Busch said he was keeping to his "own business in the low groove and we got tagged in the right-rear. It's kind of a shame — all of the hard work and the effort everybody puts into the off-season — Doug Yates and his engines and everybody from Ford and everybody at Stewart-Haas, all of the effort put towards building a car and we didn't even make it to the first pit stop, so it's kind of a bummer.” He was credited with finishing last. Kyle Busch exited pit road with the race lead. Alex Bowman (speeding) and Keselowski (too many pit boxes) restarted from the tail-end of the field.

The race restarted on lap 23. Coming to the end of the segment, a few cars – including race leader (Kyle) Busch – short-pitted the end of the segment. This handed the lead to Joey Logano as the second caution flew on lap 26 for the end of the first segment. When Logano pitted under the caution, the lead cycled to Hamlin. Busch restarted the race from the tail-end of the field for speeding.

=== Segment 2 ===
The race restarted on lap 30. Contrary to the two runs in the first segment, this run featured a three-car breakaway in the lead (Hamlin, Daniel Suárez and Matt Kenseth) that became a seven-car breakaway (joined by Logano, Jamie McMurray, Truex and Austin Dillon). The third caution flew on lap 50 for a single-car wreck on the frontstretch. Exiting Turn 4, Johnson broke loose a second time, slid down the track and slammed the inside wall head-on. He described both incidents as "bizarre because it drove really good everywhere else, then off of (Turn) 4 the first time I had a handling problem was when it broke free and I got into the No. 41 (Kurt Busch) and then after that, it was really loose. After that caution and the last long stretch before I crashed again, just off of Turn 4, the Sun certainly sits on that edge of the track a little bit harder than anywhere else."

The race restarted with 21 laps to go. The first five cars – consisting of Hamlin, Suárez, Kenseth, Busch and Dillon – broke away from the field. Heading down the backstretch with 17 to go, Truex was drafting with Kevin Harvick until Truex cut down across Kyle Larson, got turned and collected the wall in Turn 3, bringing out the fourth caution.

The race restarted with 11 to go. The Gibbs Toyotas controlled the lead, a viable outside line wasn't forming and the field was virtually single-file with five to go. With five to go, however, Keselowski, Logano and Harvick pulled out of line and made their way to the front. Busch split Harvick from the Penske teammates, but found himself split from his teammates as well. Using side-drafting, Keselowski and Logano split Kenseth and Suárez from Hamlin in the closing laps. With one lap to go, Hamlin was a sitting duck and the Penske teammates made their final push. Rounding Turn 1, Keselowski dove to the bottom line to pass Hamlin. Hamlin made a poorly-timed move down to block, caught himself on Keselowski's nose and got turned sideways. Logano drove to the high-side of the spin in Turn 2 and drove on to score the victory.

== Post-race ==
=== Driver comments ===
Logano said in victory lane that the Toyotas worked so well for most of the race because they're "selfless" and "they do such a good job working together and think of one car winning. We had to think the same way as Ford and with the Stewart-Haas and Penske cars. We were able to get a good enough run to work together enough to break them up and make the passes, and then there at the end, it was kind of a mess. I could see the block was coming way too late and it wasn't going to work. It was pretty plain what was going to happen -- I knew they were going to crash -- so I just headed to the top. Everything was going on, and I was just in the right place at the right time."

Keselowski said of his final lap move that he pulled up "beside Denny. Everything happens so fast here, he probably thought he was clear, I don’t know. We made a little contact there and I feel bad for everybody. It is the Clash, it’s not the (Daytona) 500 and I guarantee he knows and everyone else who is watching today (knows) that I’m going to make that move again. I had to make the move. I know all the other drivers are back watching and they know not to make that block on me again.”

Asked what he'd do different if given the chance to redo those last laps, Hamlin said there wasn't "much I can do differently at the end. Perhaps staying in the middle lane there through one and two and trying to side draft. He (Keselowski) had help from the 22. I was in a bad spot there. He was just coming so much faster than what I was. There's not much that I could have done to defend. We lined up so well as Toyota teammates throughout the race that once those guys started breaking that up and leap frogging, he (Keselowski) had commitment from the 22 and the 4 and when they were able to back up there that really put us at a speed differential.”

== Race results ==
| Pos | No | Driver | Team | Manufacturer | Laps |
|---|---|---|---|---|---|
| 1 | 22 | Joey Logano | Team Penske | Ford | 75 |
| 2 | 18 | Kyle Busch | Joe Gibbs Racing | Toyota | 75 |
| 3 | 88 | Alex Bowman | Hendrick Motorsports | Chevrolet | 75 |
| 4 | 10 | Danica Patrick | Stewart–Haas Racing | Ford | 75 |
| 5 | 4 | Kevin Harvick | Stewart–Haas Racing | Ford | 75 |
| 6 | 2 | Brad Keselowski | Team Penske | Ford | 75 |
| 7 | 24 | Chase Elliott | Hendrick Motorsports | Chevrolet | 75 |
| 8 | 19 | Daniel Suárez (R) | Joe Gibbs Racing | Toyota | 75 |
| 9 | 37 | Chris Buescher | JTG Daugherty Racing | Chevrolet | 75 |
| 10 | 1 | Jamie McMurray | Chip Ganassi Racing | Chevrolet | 75 |
| 11 | 20 | Matt Kenseth | Joe Gibbs Racing | Toyota | 75 |
| 12 | 3 | Austin Dillon | Richard Childress Racing | Chevrolet | 75 |
| 13 | 11 | Denny Hamlin | Joe Gibbs Racing | Toyota | 74 |
| 14 | 42 | Kyle Larson | Chip Ganassi Racing | Chevrolet | 61 |
| 15 | 78 | Martin Truex Jr. | Furniture Row Racing | Toyota | 60 |
| 16 | 48 | Jimmie Johnson | Hendrick Motorsports | Chevrolet | 48 |
| 17 | 41 | Kurt Busch | Stewart–Haas Racing | Ford | 17 |
Race results

== Media ==
FS1 covered the race on the television side, Mike Joy, Darrell Waltrip and Jeff Gordon handled the call in the booth for the race, Matt Yocum, Jamie Little, Chris Neville and Vince Welch handled pit road for the television side. Dale Earnhardt Jr. was a guest analyst in the FS1 booth.

=== Television ===
FS1
| Booth announcers | Pit reporters |
|---|---|
| Lap-by-lap: Mike Joy; Color-commentator: Jeff Gordon; Color commentator: Darrell Waltrip; Guest Analyst: Dale Earnhardt Jr. | Jamie Little; Chris Neville; Vince Welch; Matt Yocum |

=== Radio ===
MRN Radio
| Booth announcers | Turn announcers | Pit reporters |
|---|---|---|
| Lead announcer: Joe Moore; Announcer: Jeff Striegle; Announcer: Rusty Wallace | Turns 1 & 2: Dave Moody; Backstretch: Mike Bagley; Turns 3 & 4: Kyle Rickey | Alex Hayden; Winston Kelley; Steve Post |
