= 2017 Can-Am Duels =

Qualifying races for the 2017 Daytona 500

Race details
- Date: February 23, 2017
- Location: Daytona International Speedway; Daytona Beach, Florida
- Course: Permanent racing facility 2.5 mi (4 km)
- Distance: Race 1: 60 laps, 150 mi (240 km); Race 2: 60 laps, 150 mi (240 km)
- Avg Speed: Race 1: 160.095 mph (257.648 km/h); Race 2: 156.977 mph (252.630 km/h)

Race 1
- Pole position: Chase Elliott
- Most laps led: Brad Keselowski (28)
- Winner: Chase Elliott

Race 2
- Pole position: Dale Earnhardt Jr.
- Most laps led: Dale Earnhardt Jr. (53)
- Winner: Denny Hamlin

Television
- Network: FS1 & MRN
- Announcers: Mike Joy, Jeff Gordon and Darrell Waltrip (Television); Joe Moore, Jeff Striegle and Rusty Wallace (Booth); Dave Moody (1 & 2), Mike Bagley (Backstretch) and Kyle Rickey (3 & 4) (Turns) (Radio)

The 2017 Can-Am Duels were a pair of Monster Energy NASCAR Cup Series stock car races held on February 23, 2017, at Daytona International Speedway in Daytona Beach, Florida. Both contested over 60 laps, they were the qualifying races for the 2017 Daytona 500.

== Practice ==
=== First practice ===
Joey Logano was the fastest in the first practice session with a time of 46.604 seconds and a speed of 193.116 mph (310.790 km/h).

Pos	No.	Driver	Team	Manufacturer	Time	Speed
1	22	Joey Logano	Team Penske	Ford	46.604	193.116
2	43	Aric Almirola	Richard Petty Motorsports	Ford	46.619	193.054
3	2	Brad Keselowski	Team Penske	Ford	46.621	193.046
Official first practice results

== Qualifying ==
Chase Elliott scored the pole for the Daytona 500 with a time of 46.663 and a speed of 192.872 mph (310.397 km/h). He said afterwards that everyone at Hendrick Motorsports did "a lot of work this off-season. This team definitely has a knack for these plate tracks, as they showed with Jeff Gordon and then last year with here and Talladega." He also mentioned how these accomplishments don't "just happen by staying the same, as everybody knows. Everyone is always trying to get better and make their cars better and faster, and the engine shop is always finding new things. So I think that's just proof that they're improving with everybody else and taking that next step, which is really impressive." He ended by saying he was "happy to be a part of it, and hopefully we can run good next Sunday."

=== Qualifying results ===
Pos	No.	Driver	Team	Manufacturer	R1	R2
1	24	Chase Elliott	Hendrick Motorsports	Chevrolet	46.800	46.663
2	88	Dale Earnhardt Jr.	Hendrick Motorsports	Chevrolet	46.810	46.665
3	2	Brad Keselowski	Team Penske	Ford	46.820	46.707
4	14	Clint Bowyer	Stewart–Haas Racing	Ford	46.854	46.736
5	78	Martin Truex Jr.	Furniture Row Racing	Toyota	46.826	46.800
6	11	Denny Hamlin	Joe Gibbs Racing	Toyota	46.845	46.823
7	4	Kevin Harvick	Stewart–Haas Racing	Ford	46.867	46.829
8	5	Kasey Kahne	Hendrick Motorsports	Chevrolet	46.864	46.853
9	20	Matt Kenseth	Joe Gibbs Racing	Toyota	46.840	46.871
10	31	Ryan Newman	Richard Childress Racing	Chevrolet	46.859	46.876
11	18	Kyle Busch	Joe Gibbs Racing	Toyota	46.855	46.932
12	13	Ty Dillon (R)	Germain Racing	Chevrolet	46.869	47.009
13	17	Ricky Stenhouse Jr.	Roush Fenway Racing	Ford	46.874	—
14	48	Jimmie Johnson	Hendrick Motorsports	Chevrolet	46.900	—
15	19	Daniel Suárez (R)	Joe Gibbs Racing	Toyota	46.905	—
16	42	Kyle Larson	Chip Ganassi Racing	Chevrolet	46.923	—
17	22	Joey Logano	Team Penske	Ford	46.929	—
18	21	Ryan Blaney	Wood Brothers Racing	Ford	46.937	—
19	6	Trevor Bayne	Roush Fenway Racing	Ford	46.944	—
20	77	Erik Jones (R)	Furniture Row Racing	Toyota	46.950	—
21	27	Paul Menard	Richard Childress Racing	Chevrolet	46.989	—
22	41	Kurt Busch	Stewart–Haas Racing	Ford	47.017	—
23	1	Jamie McMurray	Chip Ganassi Racing	Chevrolet	47.023	—
24	10	Danica Patrick	Stewart–Haas Racing	Ford	47.042	—
25	43	Aric Almirola	Richard Petty Motorsports	Ford	47.123	—
26	3	Austin Dillon	Richard Childress Racing	Chevrolet	47.127	—
27	34	Landon Cassill	Front Row Motorsports	Ford	47.285	—
28	47	A. J. Allmendinger	JTG Daugherty Racing	Chevrolet	47.298	—
29	32	Matt DiBenedetto	Go Fas Racing	Ford	47.355	—
30	95	Michael McDowell	Leavine Family Racing	Chevrolet	47.438	—
31	37	Chris Buescher	JTG Daugherty Racing	Chevrolet	47.513	—
32	38	David Ragan	Front Row Motorsports	Ford	47.518	—
33	75	Brendan Gaughan (i)	Beard Motorsports	Chevrolet	47.545	—
34	72	Cole Whitt	TriStar Motorsports	Ford	47.592	—
35	15	Michael Waltrip	Premium Motorsports	Toyota	47.599	—
36	7	Elliott Sadler (i)	Tommy Baldwin Racing	Chevrolet	47.730	—
37	55	Reed Sorenson	Premium Motorsports	Toyota	48.043	—
38	96	D. J. Kennington	Gaunt Brothers Racing	Toyota	48.175	—
39	23	Joey Gase (i)	BK Racing	Toyota	48.428	—
40	83	Corey LaJoie (R)	BK Racing	Toyota	48.584	—
41	33	Jeffrey Earnhardt	Circle Sport – The Motorsports Group	Chevrolet	48.710	—
42	51	Timmy Hill (i)	Rick Ware Racing	Chevrolet	48.886	—
Official Qualifying Results

== Practice (post–Qualifying) ==
Both practice sessions scheduled for Thursday following qualifying was cancelled due to rain.

== Duels ==
=== Duel 1 ===
==== First half ====
Chase Elliott led the field to the green flag at 7:19 p.m. He side-drafted Brad Keselowski on the backstretch to jump in front and lead the first lap. Keselowski dove under him in Turn 2 to take the lead the following lap. While he was leading, teammate Joey Logano made an unscheduled stop on lap 12 for a flat tire and rejoined a lap down. Kyle Busch took the lead as the first caution of the race, a scheduled competition caution due to rain showers, flew on lap 25. Everyone pitted under the caution and Busch retained the lead. Matt DiBenedetto restarted from the tail-end of the field for speeding on pit road.

==== Second half ====
The race restarted on lap 31. When the field reached the backstretch, Keselowski powered by Busch on the outside lane to take back the lead. Elliott dove inside Keselowski in Turn 2 to retake the lead on lap 37. The second caution flew with 12 laps to go for a two-car wreck on the frontstretch. Coming through the tri-oval heading towards Turn 1, Corey LaJoie rear-ended Reed Sorenson, who checked up, turning Sorenson down into Paul Menard, sending Sorenson down the track and into the inside retaining wall. Sorenson, who missed the race as a result of this wreck, said he guessed LaJoie "felt like he did what he had to do to make the race. I hope he's proud of that part of it. There's a lot of pressure going in to making this race. It's a very big deal for a small team like ours." Sorenson went on to finish last.

The race restarted with eight laps to go. The Fords of Kevin Harvick and Keselowski formed a line on the top side to make a charge at Elliott. The line started stalling out with five laps to go and Elliott drove on to score the victory, only challenged by Harvick and Jamie McMurray.

==== Duel 1 results ====
Pos	Grid	No	Driver	Team	Manufacturer	Laps	Points
1	1	24	Chase Elliott	Hendrick Motorsports	Chevrolet	60	10
2	12	1	Jamie McMurray	Chip Ganassi Racing	Chevrolet	60	9
3	4	4	Kevin Harvick	Stewart–Haas Racing	Ford	60	8
4	2	2	Brad Keselowski	Team Penske	Ford	60	7
5	5	20	Matt Kenseth	Joe Gibbs Racing	Toyota	60	6
6	10	6	Trevor Bayne	Roush Fenway Racing	Ford	60	5
7	13	43	Aric Almirola	Richard Petty Motorsports	Ford	60	4
8	9	22	Joey Logano	Team Penske	Ford	60	3
9	18	72	Cole Whitt	TriStar Motorsports	Ford	60	2
10	8	19	Daniel Suárez (R)	Joe Gibbs Racing	Toyota	60	1
11	6	18	Kyle Busch	Joe Gibbs Racing	Toyota	60	0
12	7	17	Ricky Stenhouse Jr.	Roush Fenway Racing	Ford	60	0
13	15	32	Matt DiBenedetto	Go Fas Racing	Ford	60	0
14	14	34	Landon Cassill	Front Row Motorsports	Ford	60	0
15	20	23	Joey Gase (i)	BK Racing	Toyota	60	0
16	21	83	Corey LaJoie (R)	BK Racing	Toyota	60	0
17	17	75	Brendan Gaughan (i)	Beard Motorsports	Chevrolet	60	0
18	11	27	Paul Menard	Richard Childress Racing	Chevrolet	59	0
19	19	55	Reed Sorenson	Premium Motorsports	Toyota	48	0
20	3	78	Martin Truex Jr.	Furniture Row Racing	Toyota	60	0
21	16	37	Chris Buescher	JTG Daugherty Racing	Chevrolet	60	0
Official race results

=== Duel 2 ===
==== First half ====
Dale Earnhardt Jr. led the field to the green flag at 8:51 p.m. He and Denny Hamlin raced side-by-side for the lead for five laps before the field settled into a single-file train running against the wall. The race flow was broken up by the lap 26 competition caution, also scheduled due to earlier rain showers. Everyone pitted under the caution and Ryan Blaney exited pit road with the race lead. Hamlin (speeding) and Elliott Sadler (driving through too many pit boxes) restarted the race from the tail-end of the field.

==== Second half ====
The race restarted on lap 31 and Earnhardt wasted little time taking the lead back from Blaney. Unlike the first Duel race, this race was more calm and reserved. Action started picking up with 18 laps to go when Jimmie Johnson made contact with Blaney on the backstretch, forcing Blaney into the outside wall. Five laps later, Johnson suffered a right-side tire blowout on the backstretch and slammed the wall in Turn 3, bringing out the second caution.

The race restarted with nine to go. On the final lap, Hamlin received a push from Austin Dillon, faked Earnhardt out on the backstretch and passed him going into Turn 3 to win the second Duel race.

==== Duel 2 results ====
Pos	Grid	No	Driver	Team	Manufacturer	Laps	Points
1	3	11	Denny Hamlin	Joe Gibbs Racing	Toyota	60	10
2	2	14	Clint Bowyer	Stewart–Haas Racing	Ford	60	9
3	11	41	Kurt Busch	Stewart–Haas Racing	Ford	60	8
4	13	3	Austin Dillon	Richard Childress Racing	Chevrolet	60	7
5	1	88	Dale Earnhardt Jr.	Hendrick Motorsports	Chevrolet	60	6
6	12	10	Danica Patrick	Stewart–Haas Racing	Ford	60	5
7	5	31	Ryan Newman	Richard Childress Racing	Chevrolet	60	4
8	8	42	Kyle Larson	Chip Ganassi Racing	Chevrolet	60	3
9	6	13	Ty Dillon (R)	Germain Racing	Chevrolet	60	2
10	16	38	David Ragan	Front Row Motorsports	Ford	60	1
11	15	95	Michael McDowell	Leavine Family Racing	Chevrolet	60	0
12	7	48	Jimmie Johnson	Hendrick Motorsports	Chevrolet	60	0
13	4	5	Kasey Kahne	Hendrick Motorsports	Chevrolet	60	0
14	19	96	D. J. Kennington	Gaunt Brothers Racing	Toyota	60	0
15	18	7	Elliott Sadler (i)	Tommy Baldwin Racing	Chevrolet	60	0
16	17	15	Michael Waltrip	Premium Motorsports	Toyota	60	0
17	20	33	Jeffrey Earnhardt	Circle Sport – The Motorsports Group	Chevrolet	60	0
18	10	77	Erik Jones (R)	Furniture Row Racing	Toyota	59	0
19	9	21	Ryan Blaney	Wood Brothers Racing	Ford	55	0
20	21	51	Timmy Hill (i)	Rick Ware Racing	Chevrolet	29	0
21	14	47	A. J. Allmendinger	JTG Daugherty Racing	Chevrolet	60	0
Official race results

== Media ==
=== Television ===
FS1
Booth announcers	Pit reporters
Lap-by-lap: Mike Joy; Color-commentator: Jeff Gordon; Color commentator: Darrell Waltrip	Jamie Little; Chris Neville; Vince Welch; Matt Yocum

=== Radio ===
MRN Radio
Booth announcers	Turn announcers	Pit reporters
Lead announcer: Joe Moore; Announcer: Jeff Striegle; Announcer: Rusty Wallace	Turns 1 & 2: Dave Moody; Backstretch: Mike Bagley; Turns 3 & 4: Kyle Rickey	Alex Hayden; Winston Kelley; Steve Post
