= 2017 Go Bowling 400 =

Race details
- Race 11 of 36 in the 2017 Monster Energy NASCAR Cup Series
- Date: May 13, 2017
- Location: Kansas Speedway in Kansas City, Kansas
- Course: Permanent racing facility
- Course length: 1.5 miles (2.4 km)
- Distance: 267 laps, 400.5 mi (644.542 km)
- Average speed: 117.640 miles per hour (189.323 km/h)

Pole position
| Driver | Ryan Blaney | Wood Brothers Racing |
- Time: 28.481

Most laps led
| Driver | Martin Truex Jr. | Furniture Row Racing |
- Laps: 104

Winner
| No. 78 | Martin Truex Jr. | Furniture Row Racing |

Television in the United States
- Network: FS1
- Announcers: Mike Joy, Jeff Gordon and Darrell Waltrip

Radio in the United States
- Radio: MRN
- Booth announcers: Joe Moore, Jeff Striegle and Rusty Wallace
- Turn announcers: Dave Moody (1 & 2) and Mike Bagley (3 & 4)

The 2017 Go Bowling 400 was a Monster Energy NASCAR Cup Series race held on May 13, 2017, at Kansas Speedway in Kansas City, Kansas. Contested over 267 laps on the 1.5 mile (2.4 km) asphalt speedway, it was the 11th race of the 2017 Monster Energy NASCAR Cup Series season.

== Entry list ==
| No. | Driver | Team | Manufacturer |
|---|---|---|---|
| 1 | Jamie McMurray | Chip Ganassi Racing | Chevrolet |
| 2 | Brad Keselowski | Team Penske | Ford |
| 3 | Austin Dillon | Richard Childress Racing | Chevrolet |
| 4 | Kevin Harvick | Stewart–Haas Racing | Ford |
| 5 | Kasey Kahne | Hendrick Motorsports | Chevrolet |
| 6 | Trevor Bayne | Roush Fenway Racing | Ford |
| 10 | Danica Patrick | Stewart–Haas Racing | Ford |
| 11 | Denny Hamlin | Joe Gibbs Racing | Toyota |
| 13 | Ty Dillon (R) | Germain Racing | Chevrolet |
| 14 | Clint Bowyer | Stewart–Haas Racing | Ford |
| 15 | Reed Sorenson | Premium Motorsports | Chevrolet |
| 17 | Ricky Stenhouse Jr. | Roush Fenway Racing | Ford |
| 18 | Kyle Busch | Joe Gibbs Racing | Toyota |
| 19 | Daniel Suárez (R) | Joe Gibbs Racing | Toyota |
| 20 | Matt Kenseth | Joe Gibbs Racing | Toyota |
| 21 | Ryan Blaney | Wood Brothers Racing | Ford |
| 22 | Joey Logano | Team Penske | Ford |
| 23 | Gray Gaulding (R) | BK Racing | Toyota |
| 24 | Chase Elliott | Hendrick Motorsports | Chevrolet |
| 27 | Paul Menard | Richard Childress Racing | Chevrolet |
| 31 | Ryan Newman | Richard Childress Racing | Chevrolet |
| 32 | Matt DiBenedetto | Go Fas Racing | Ford |
| 33 | Jeffrey Earnhardt | Circle Sport – The Motorsports Group | Chevrolet |
| 34 | Landon Cassill | Front Row Motorsports | Ford |
| 37 | Chris Buescher | JTG Daugherty Racing | Chevrolet |
| 38 | David Ragan | Front Row Motorsports | Ford |
| 41 | Kurt Busch | Stewart–Haas Racing | Ford |
| 42 | Kyle Larson | Chip Ganassi Racing | Chevrolet |
| 43 | Aric Almirola | Richard Petty Motorsports | Ford |
| 47 | A. J. Allmendinger | JTG Daugherty Racing | Chevrolet |
| 48 | Jimmie Johnson | Hendrick Motorsports | Chevrolet |
| 51 | Timmy Hill (i) | Rick Ware Racing | Chevrolet |
| 55 | Derrike Cope | Premium Motorsports | Toyota |
| 66 | Carl Long (i) | MBM Motorsports | Chevrolet |
| 72 | Cole Whitt | TriStar Motorsports | Chevrolet |
| 77 | Erik Jones (R) | Furniture Row Racing | Toyota |
| 78 | Martin Truex Jr. | Furniture Row Racing | Toyota |
| 83 | Corey LaJoie (R) | BK Racing | Toyota |
| 88 | Dale Earnhardt Jr. | Hendrick Motorsports | Chevrolet |
| 95 | Michael McDowell | Leavine Family Racing | Chevrolet |
Official entry list

== Practice ==
=== First practice ===
Martin Truex Jr. was the fastest in the first practice session with a time of 29.179 seconds and a speed of 185.065 mph (297.833 km/h).

| Pos | No. | Driver | Team | Manufacturer | Time | Speed |
|---|---|---|---|---|---|---|
| 1 | 78 | Martin Truex Jr. | Furniture Row Racing | Toyota | 29.179 | 185.065 |
| 2 | 21 | Ryan Blaney | Wood Brothers Racing | Ford | 29.200 | 184.932 |
| 3 | 77 | Erik Jones (R) | Furniture Row Racing | Toyota | 29.253 | 184.596 |
Official first practice results

=== Final practice ===
Kyle Busch was the fastest in the final practice session with a time of 28.729 seconds and a speed of 187.963 mph (302.497 km/h).

| Pos | No. | Driver | Team | Manufacturer | Time | Speed |
|---|---|---|---|---|---|---|
| 1 | 18 | Kyle Busch | Joe Gibbs Racing | Toyota | 28.729 | 187.963 |
| 2 | 42 | Kyle Larson | Chip Ganassi Racing | Chevrolet | 28.749 | 187.833 |
| 3 | 78 | Martin Truex Jr. | Furniture Row Racing | Toyota | 28.830 | 187.305 |
Official final practice results

== Qualifying ==
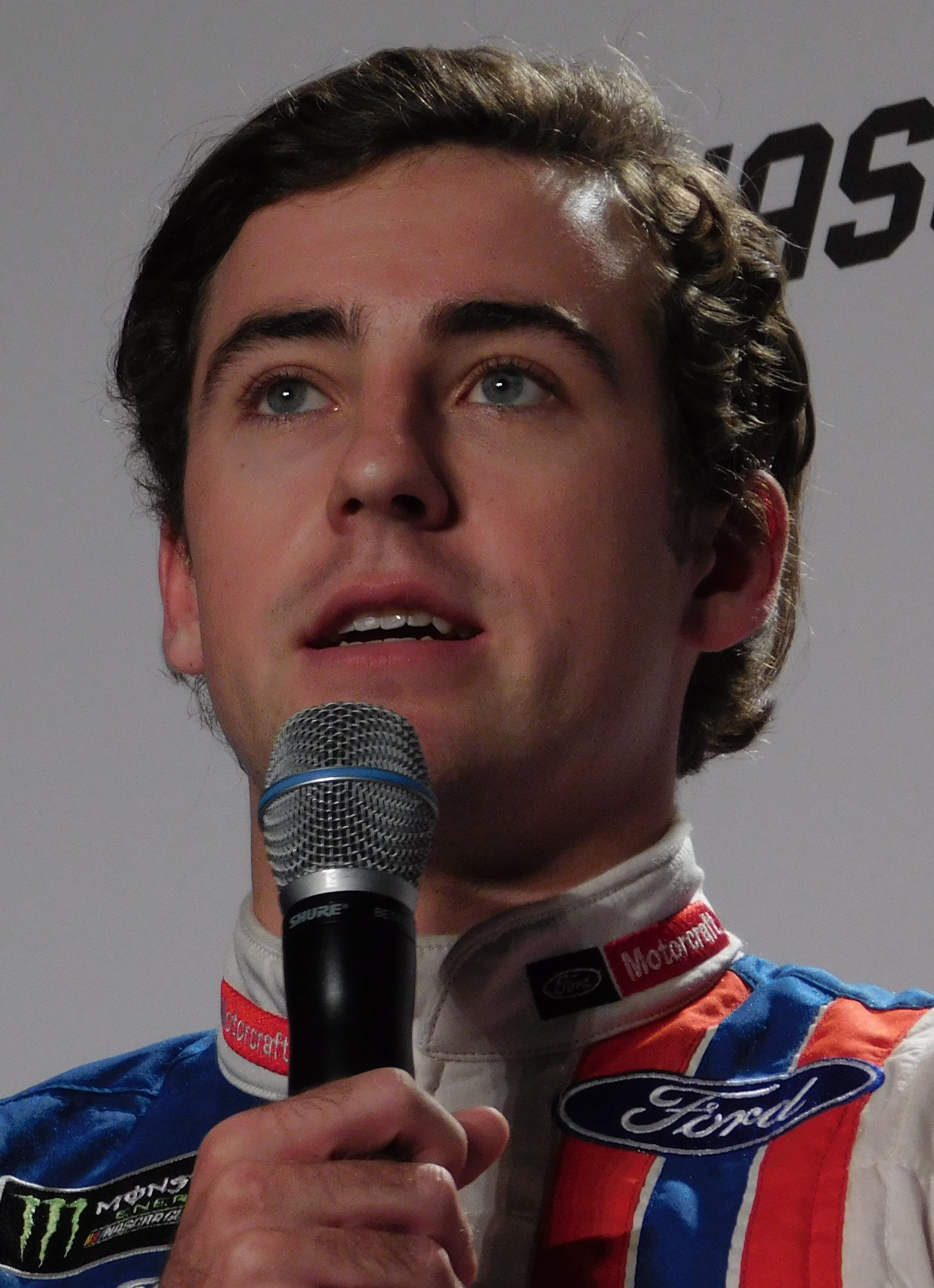
Ryan Blaney scored the pole position.

Ryan Blaney scored the pole for the race with a time of 28.481 and a speed of 189.600 mph (305.132 km/h). He said afterwards that 2017 "has been a big step up in qualifying. Your car and track changes and you have to be on top of that. Everyone has done a great job of staying on top of that. We have been really close a couple times this year but it feels good to get it done. I know it is only qualifying but it feels really cool to get this first pole. It says a lot about this entire team.”

=== Qualifying results ===
| Pos | No. | Driver | Team | Manufacturer | R1 | R2 | R3 |
|---|---|---|---|---|---|---|---|
| 1 | 21 | Ryan Blaney | Wood Brothers Racing | Ford | 28.602 | 28.499 | 28.481 |
| 2 | 22 | Joey Logano | Team Penske | Ford | 28.664 | 28.493 | 28.490 |
| 3 | 78 | Martin Truex Jr. | Furniture Row Racing | Toyota | 28.703 | 28.526 | 28.541 |
| 4 | 17 | Ricky Stenhouse Jr. | Roush Fenway Racing | Ford | 28.584 | 28.610 | 28.594 |
| 5 | 18 | Kyle Busch | Joe Gibbs Racing | Toyota | 28.373 | 28.331 | 28.648 |
| 6 | 41 | Kurt Busch | Stewart–Haas Racing | Ford | 28.642 | 28.620 | 28.648 |
| 7 | 11 | Denny Hamlin | Joe Gibbs Racing | Toyota | 28.984 | 28.688 | 28.680 |
| 8 | 4 | Kevin Harvick | Stewart–Haas Racing | Ford | 28.387 | 28.361 | 28.685 |
| 9 | 42 | Kyle Larson | Chip Ganassi Racing | Chevrolet | 28.555 | 28.515 | 28.731 |
| 10 | 24 | Chase Elliott | Hendrick Motorsports | Chevrolet | 28.778 | 28.605 | 28.801 |
| 11 | 3 | Austin Dillon | Richard Childress Racing | Chevrolet | 28.862 | 28.689 | 28.840 |
| 12 | 1 | Jamie McMurray | Chip Ganassi Racing | Chevrolet | 28.717 | 28.625 | 28.895 |
| 13 | 43 | Aric Almirola | Richard Petty Motorsports | Ford | 28.536 | 28.712 | — |
| 14 | 20 | Matt Kenseth | Joe Gibbs Racing | Toyota | 28.887 | 28.726 | — |
| 15 | 19 | Daniel Suárez (R) | Joe Gibbs Racing | Toyota | 29.013 | 28.728 | — |
| 16 | 6 | Trevor Bayne | Roush Fenway Racing | Ford | 28.990 | 28.744 | — |
| 17 | 2 | Brad Keselowski | Team Penske | Ford | 28.767 | 28.750 | — |
| 18 | 27 | Paul Menard | Richard Childress Racing | Chevrolet | 28.795 | 28.766 | — |
| 19 | 31 | Ryan Newman | Richard Childress Racing | Chevrolet | 28.883 | 28.775 | — |
| 20 | 37 | Chris Buescher | JTG Daugherty Racing | Chevrolet | 29.077 | 28.895 | — |
| 21 | 47 | A. J. Allmendinger | JTG Daugherty Racing | Chevrolet | 28.938 | 28.898 | — |
| 22 | 13 | Ty Dillon (R) | Germain Racing | Chevrolet | 29.061 | 29.013 | — |
| 23 | 32 | Matt DiBenedetto | Go Fas Racing | Ford | 28.991 | 29.103 | — |
| 24 | 10 | Danica Patrick | Stewart–Haas Racing | Ford | 28.833 | 29.252 | — |
| 25 | 23 | Gray Gaulding (R) | BK Racing | Toyota | 29.339 | — | — |
| 26 | 72 | Cole Whitt | TriStar Motorsports | Chevrolet | 29.783 | — | — |
| 27 | 33 | Jeffrey Earnhardt | Circle Sport – The Motorsports Group | Chevrolet | 30.313 | — | — |
| 28 | 55 | Derrike Cope | Premium Motorsports | Toyota | 30.875 | — | — |
| 29 | 48 | Jimmie Johnson | Hendrick Motorsports | Chevrolet | 0.000 | — | — |
| 30 | 14 | Clint Bowyer | Stewart–Haas Racing | Ford | 0.000 | — | — |
| 31 | 5 | Kasey Kahne | Hendrick Motorsports | Chevrolet | 0.000 | — | — |
| 32 | 77 | Erik Jones (R) | Furniture Row Racing | Toyota | 0.000 | — | — |
| 33 | 88 | Dale Earnhardt Jr. | Hendrick Motorsports | Chevrolet | 0.000 | — | — |
| 34 | 38 | David Ragan | Front Row Motorsports | Ford | 0.000 | — | — |
| 35 | 95 | Michael McDowell | Leavine Family Racing | Chevrolet | 0.000 | — | — |
| 36 | 34 | Landon Cassill | Front Row Motorsports | Ford | 0.000 | — | — |
| 37 | 15 | Reed Sorenson | Premium Motorsports | Chevrolet | 0.000 | — | — |
| 38 | 83 | Corey LaJoie (R) | BK Racing | Toyota | 0.000 | — | — |
| 39 | 51 | Timmy Hill (i) | Rick Ware Racing | Chevrolet | 0.000 | — | — |
| 40 | 66 | Carl Long (i) | MBM Motorsports | Chevrolet | 0.000 | — | — |
Official qualifying results

== Race ==
=== First stage ===
Ryan Blaney led the field to the green flag at 7:53 p.m. Martin Truex Jr. shot past his outside exiting Turn 2 to take the lead on lap 11. The first caution of the race flew on lap 29 when Landon Cassill's right-front tire went flat and he slammed the wall in Turn 1.

The race restarted on lap 35. Cassill brought out the second caution on lap 50 when he slammed the wall a second time. Kevin Harvick opted not to pit and assumed the lead. During the caution period, Chase Elliott was exiting his pit box just as Michael McDowell was entering his when McDowell came across the nose of Elliott, causing damage to Elliott's car.

The race restarted on lap 55. The third caution flew on lap 58 when Ty Dillon spun out in Turn 2.

The race restarted on lap 62. Harvick spun his tires on the restart, Kyle Busch took over the race lead and drove on to win the first stage. The fourth caution flew on lap 80 for the conclusion of the stage. Truex exited pit road with the race lead. Jimmie Johnson restarted from the tail-end of the field for driving through too many pit boxes.

=== Second stage ===
The race restarted on lap 88. Erik Jones brought out the fifth caution on lap 97 when he spun out in Turn 2.

The race restarted on lap 100 and Busch took back the lead exiting Turn 2. Debris in Turn 2, from Johnson's car, brought out the sixth caution on lap 102.

The race restarted on lap 105. Brad Keselowski, who was running fifth, made an unscheduled stop for a loose wheel on lap 120. He was then hit with a pass through penalty for driving through too many pit boxes. He rejoined the race 35th two laps down. The seventh caution flew on lap 136 when Corey LaJoie suffered cuts on both right-side tires and slammed the wall in Turn 3.

The race restarted on lap 142. The eighth caution flew on lap 146 when Gray Gaulding slammed the wall in Turn 4, and his right-rear tire shredded in Turn 2.

The race restarted on lap 152. Blaney won the second stage and the ninth caution flew for the conclusion of the stage.

=== Final stage ===
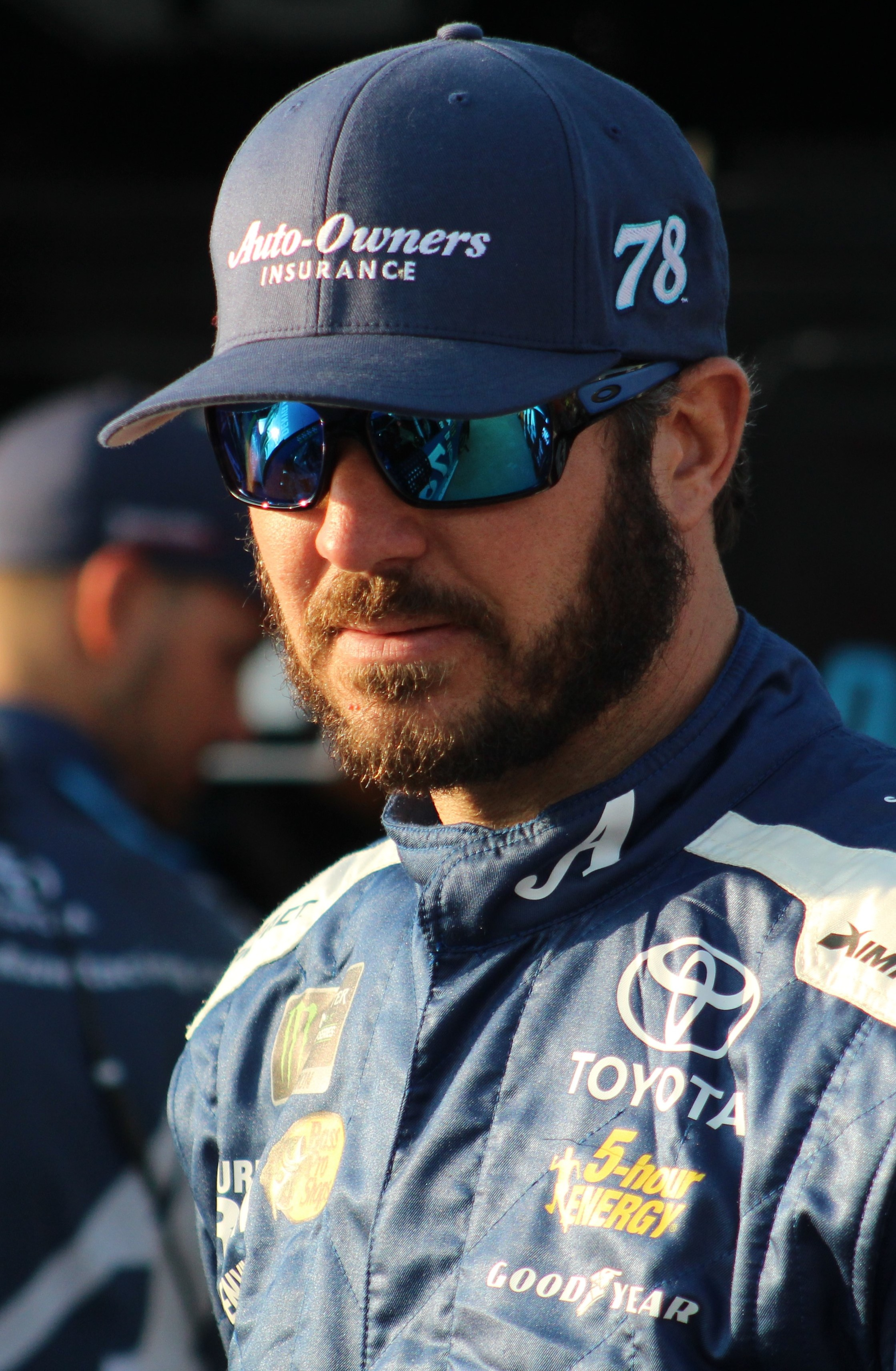
Martin Truex Jr. won the race.

The race restarted on lap 167. Truex took the lead going into Turn 3 with 87 laps to go. The 10th caution flew with 74 to go for a two-car wreck in Turn 1 involving A. J. Allmendinger and Paul Menard.

The race restarted with 69 to go. The following lap, Joey Logano went to the outside of Danica Patrick for position going into Turn 1 when he suffered a right-front brake failure, veered down and hooked Patrick, sending her head-on into the outside wall. Logano's car got loose and slid backwards into the wall not far ahead of her. Aric Almirola, who was seven car length's back of the wreck when it started, got loose in the top lane, couldn't slow it down in time, clipped the left-rear corner of Patrick's car and slammed into the drivers-side of Logano's car, lifting his car in the air for a few seconds. Logano and Patrick exited their wrecked cars under their own power, but Almirola, who put his window net down (to signal the safety crews that he was "alert"), required the safety team to extract him, and air lift to a local hospital, due to an injury that he sustained. This violent three-car wreck brought out the 11th caution with 68 to go, and cleanup necessitated a red flag for roughly 30 minutes.

Logano said after he was released from the infield care center that all three drivers involved "took a hard hit. Something broke on (my) car - I don't know what it was. I noticed it going in (to the turn) and tried to back off but you're going 215 (mph). I took a hard left. I just hope everyone is OK. I hooked Danica. I haven't seen the replay (until now). don't know what happened. The right-front popped and I took a hard left. I hope Aric is alright. That's the last thing you want to see is a big hit like that for anyone. It came out of nowhere. Everything was fine and I just took a hard one. I'm praying for Aric right now. I hate to be the part that started it but there was nothing I could have done. Something broke and we tore up a lot of cars."

The race restarted with 63 to go. The 12th caution flew with 52 to go when Jones got loose in the speedy dry in the top lane of Turns 1 and 2, laid down for the previous three-car wreck with 68 to go, and spun out in Turn 2. Dale Earnhardt Jr. opted not to pit and assumed the lead.

The race restarted with 47 to go and Blaney edged out Busch at the line to retake the lead. Truex passed him exiting Turn 2 with 24 to go to retake the lead. The 13th caution flew with 22 to go when LaJoie slammed the wall in Turn 1. Jones opted not to pit and assumed the lead.

The race restarted with 19 to go. Truex went to Blaney's outside and powered around him and teammate Jones in Turn 1 to take the lead with 18 to go. The 14th caution flew with nine to go when Jones got turned by Dillon exiting Turn 4 and spun through the infield grass.

The race restarted with five to go and Johnson and Kurt Busch made contact, sending Johnson spinning through Turn 1 and put the race under caution for the 15th time.

The race restarted with two laps to go. Truex drove on to score the victory.

== Race results ==
=== Stage results ===
Stage 1 Laps: 80

| Pos | No | Driver | Team | Manufacturer | Points |
|---|---|---|---|---|---|
| 1 | 18 | Kyle Busch | Joe Gibbs Racing | Toyota | 10 |
| 2 | 78 | Martin Truex Jr. | Furniture Row Racing | Toyota | 9 |
| 3 | 21 | Ryan Blaney | Wood Brothers Racing | Ford | 8 |
| 4 | 42 | Kyle Larson | Chip Ganassi Racing | Chevrolet | 7 |
| 5 | 2 | Brad Keselowski | Team Penske | Ford | 6 |
| 6 | 48 | Jimmie Johnson | Hendrick Motorsports | Chevrolet | 5 |
| 7 | 4 | Kevin Harvick | Stewart–Haas Racing | Ford | 4 |
| 8 | 11 | Denny Hamlin | Joe Gibbs Racing | Toyota | 3 |
| 9 | 5 | Kasey Kahne | Hendrick Motorsports | Chevrolet | 2 |
| 10 | 41 | Kurt Busch | Stewart–Haas Racing | Ford | 1 |
Official stage one results

Stage 2 Laps: 80

| Pos | No | Driver | Team | Manufacturer | Points |
|---|---|---|---|---|---|
| 1 | 21 | Ryan Blaney | Wood Brothers Racing | Ford | 10 |
| 2 | 42 | Kyle Larson | Chip Ganassi Racing | Chevrolet | 9 |
| 3 | 78 | Martin Truex Jr. | Furniture Row Racing | Toyota | 8 |
| 4 | 1 | Jamie McMurray | Chip Ganassi Racing | Chevrolet | 7 |
| 5 | 18 | Kyle Busch | Joe Gibbs Racing | Toyota | 6 |
| 6 | 11 | Denny Hamlin | Joe Gibbs Racing | Toyota | 5 |
| 7 | 5 | Kasey Kahne | Hendrick Motorsports | Chevrolet | 4 |
| 8 | 20 | Matt Kenseth | Joe Gibbs Racing | Toyota | 3 |
| 9 | 77 | Erik Jones (R) | Furniture Row Racing | Toyota | 2 |
| 10 | 22 | Joey Logano | Team Penske | Ford | 1 |
Official stage two results

=== Final stage results ===
Stage 3 Laps: 107

| Pos | Grid | No | Driver | Team | Manufacturer | Laps | Points |
|---|---|---|---|---|---|---|---|
| 1 | 3 | 78 | Martin Truex Jr. | Furniture Row Racing | Toyota | 267 | 57 |
| 2 | 17 | 2 | Brad Keselowski | Team Penske | Ford | 267 | 41 |
| 3 | 8 | 4 | Kevin Harvick | Stewart–Haas Racing | Ford | 267 | 38 |
| 4 | 1 | 21 | Ryan Blaney | Wood Brothers Racing | Ford | 267 | 51 |
| 5 | 5 | 18 | Kyle Busch | Joe Gibbs Racing | Toyota | 267 | 48 |
| 6 | 9 | 42 | Kyle Larson | Chip Ganassi Racing | Chevrolet | 267 | 47 |
| 7 | 15 | 19 | Daniel Suárez (R) | Joe Gibbs Racing | Toyota | 267 | 30 |
| 8 | 12 | 1 | Jamie McMurray | Chip Ganassi Racing | Chevrolet | 267 | 36 |
| 9 | 30 | 14 | Clint Bowyer | Stewart–Haas Racing | Ford | 267 | 28 |
| 10 | 16 | 6 | Trevor Bayne | Roush Fenway Racing | Ford | 267 | 27 |
| 11 | 4 | 17 | Ricky Stenhouse Jr. | Roush Fenway Racing | Ford | 267 | 26 |
| 12 | 14 | 20 | Matt Kenseth | Joe Gibbs Racing | Toyota | 267 | 28 |
| 13 | 35 | 95 | Michael McDowell | Leavine Family Racing | Chevrolet | 267 | 24 |
| 14 | 22 | 13 | Ty Dillon (R) | Germain Racing | Chevrolet | 267 | 23 |
| 15 | 31 | 5 | Kasey Kahne | Hendrick Motorsports | Chevrolet | 267 | 28 |
| 16 | 11 | 3 | Austin Dillon | Richard Childress Racing | Chevrolet | 267 | 21 |
| 17 | 34 | 38 | David Ragan | Front Row Motorsports | Ford | 267 | 20 |
| 18 | 20 | 37 | Chris Buescher | JTG Daugherty Racing | Chevrolet | 267 | 19 |
| 19 | 6 | 41 | Kurt Busch | Stewart–Haas Racing | Ford | 267 | 19 |
| 20 | 33 | 88 | Dale Earnhardt Jr. | Hendrick Motorsports | Chevrolet | 267 | 17 |
| 21 | 36 | 34 | Landon Cassill | Front Row Motorsports | Ford | 267 | 16 |
| 22 | 32 | 77 | Erik Jones (R) | Furniture Row Racing | Toyota | 267 | 17 |
| 23 | 7 | 11 | Denny Hamlin | Joe Gibbs Racing | Toyota | 267 | 22 |
| 24 | 29 | 48 | Jimmie Johnson | Hendrick Motorsports | Chevrolet | 267 | 18 |
| 25 | 37 | 15 | Reed Sorenson | Premium Motorsports | Chevrolet | 267 | 12 |
| 26 | 26 | 72 | Cole Whitt | TriStar Motorsports | Chevrolet | 266 | 11 |
| 27 | 38 | 83 | Corey LaJoie (R) | BK Racing | Toyota | 265 | 10 |
| 28 | 39 | 51 | Timmy Hill (i) | Rick Ware Racing | Chevrolet | 259 | 0 |
| 29 | 10 | 24 | Chase Elliott | Hendrick Motorsports | Chevrolet | 258 | 8 |
| 30 | 21 | 47 | A. J. Allmendinger | JTG Daugherty Racing | Chevrolet | 257 | 7 |
| 31 | 40 | 66 | Carl Long (i) | MBM Motorsports | Chevrolet | 256 | 0 |
| 32 | 23 | 32 | Matt DiBenedetto | Go Fas Racing | Ford | 243 | 5 |
| 33 | 27 | 33 | Jeffrey Earnhardt | Circle Sport – The Motorsports Group | Chevrolet | 243 | 4 |
| 34 | 25 | 23 | Gray Gaulding (R) | BK Racing | Toyota | 231 | 3 |
| 35 | 18 | 27 | Paul Menard | Richard Childress Racing | Chevrolet | 202 | 2 |
| 36 | 24 | 10 | Danica Patrick | Stewart–Haas Racing | Ford | 199 | 1 |
| 37 | 2 | 22 | Joey Logano | Team Penske | Ford | 199 | 2 |
| 38 | 13 | 43 | Aric Almirola | Richard Petty Motorsports | Ford | 199 | 1 |
| 39 | 28 | 55 | Derrike Cope | Premium Motorsports | Toyota | 179 | 1 |
| 40 | 19 | 31 | Ryan Newman | Richard Childress Racing | Chevrolet | 154 | 1 |
Official race results

=== Race statistics ===
- Lead changes: 9 among different drivers
- Cautions/Laps: 15 for 61
- Red flags: 1 for 27 minutes and 41 seconds
- Time of race: 3 hours, 24 minutes and 16 seconds
- Average speed: 117.640 miles per hour (189.323 km/h)

== Media ==
=== Television ===
Fox Sports covered their seventh race at the Kansas Speedway. Mike Joy, three-time Kansas winner Jeff Gordon and Darrell Waltrip called in the booth for the race. Jamie Little, Vince Welch and Matt Yocum handled the action on pit road for the television side.

FS1
| Booth announcers | Pit reporters |
|---|---|
| Lap-by-lap: Mike Joy; Color-commentator: Jeff Gordon; Color commentator: Darrell Waltrip | Jamie Little; Vince Welch; Matt Yocum |

=== Radio ===
MRN had the radio call for the race which was also simulcasted on Sirius XM NASCAR Radio. Joe Moore, Jeff Striegle and Rusty Wallace called the race in the booth when the field raced through the tri-oval. Dave Moody covered the race from the Sunoco spotters stand outside turn 2 when the field is racing through turns 1 and 2. Mike Bagley called the race from a platform outside turn 4. Alex Hayden, Winston Kelley, Kim Coon, and Steve Post worked pit road for the radio side.

MRN Radio
| Booth announcers | Turn announcers | Pit reporters |
|---|---|---|
| Lead announcer: Joe Moore; Announcer: Jeff Striegle; Announcer: Rusty Wallace | Turns 1 & 2: Dave Moody; Turns 3 & 4: Mike Bagley | Alex Hayden; Winston Kelley; Kim Coon; Steve Post |

== Standings after the race ==
Drivers' Championship standings

| | Pos | Driver | Points |
|---|---|---|---|
| | 1 | Kyle Larson | 475 |
| | 2 | Martin Truex Jr. | 431 (–44) |
| | 3 | Brad Keselowski | 408 (–67) |
| | 4 | Chase Elliott | 361 (–114) |
| | 5 | Jamie McMurray | 354 (–121) |
| 1 | 6 | Kevin Harvick | 347 (–128) |
| 3 | 7 | Kyle Busch | 325 (–150) |
| | 8 | Jimmie Johnson | 323 (–152) |
| 3 | 9 | Joey Logano | 320 (–155) |
| 1 | 10 | Clint Bowyer | 317 (–158) |
| 2 | 11 | Ryan Blaney | 291 (–184) |
| 1 | 12 | Denny Hamlin | 289 (–186) |
| 1 | 13 | Ricky Stenhouse Jr. | 276 (–199) |
| 2 | 14 | Trevor Bayne | 250 (–225) |
| | 15 | Kurt Busch | 246 (–229) |
| 2 | 16 | Kasey Kahne | 242 (–233) |
Official driver's standings

Manufacturers' Championship standings

| Pos | Manufacturer | Points |
|---|---|---|
| 1 | Ford | 400 |
| 2 | Chevrolet | 395 (–5) |
| 3 | Toyota | 375 (–25) |
Official manufacturers' standings

- Note: Only the first 16 positions are included for the driver standings.
- . – Driver has clinched a position in the Monster Energy NASCAR Cup Series playoffs.

| Previous race: 2017 GEICO 500 | Monster Energy NASCAR Cup Series; 2017 season | Next race: 2017 Coca-Cola 600 |
