= 2017 Food City 500 =

Race details
- Race 8 of 36 in the 2017 Monster Energy NASCAR Cup Series
- 2017 Food City 500 program cover, featuring the last winner of the Food City 500, Carl Edwards.
- Date: April 24, 2017
- Location: Bristol Motor Speedway in Bristol, Tennessee
- Course: Permanent racing facility
- Course length: 0.533 miles (0.858 km)
- Distance: 500 laps, 266.5 mi (429 km)
- Average speed: 86.674 miles per hour (139.488 km/h)

Pole position
Driver	Kyle Larson	Chip Ganassi Racing
- Time: N/A

Most laps led
Driver	Kyle Larson	Chip Ganassi Racing
- Laps: 202

Winner
No. 48	Jimmie Johnson	Hendrick Motorsports

Television in the United States
- Network: Fox
- Announcers: Mike Joy, Jeff Gordon and Darrell Waltrip
- Nielsen ratings: 1.5/3 (Overnight)

Radio in the United States
- Radio: PRN
- Booth announcers: Doug Rice, Mark Garrow and Wendy Venturini
- Turn announcers: Rob Albright (Backstretch)

The 2017 Food City 500 was a Monster Energy NASCAR Cup Series race that was scheduled for April 23, 2017, but was postponed until April 24, 2017 due to rain at Bristol Motor Speedway in Bristol, Tennessee. Contested over 500 laps on the 0.533 miles (0.858 km) concrete short track, it was the eighth race of the 2017 Monster Energy NASCAR Cup Series season.

== Entry list ==
No.	Driver	Team	Manufacturer
1	Jamie McMurray	Chip Ganassi Racing	Chevrolet
2	Brad Keselowski	Team Penske	Ford
3	Austin Dillon	Richard Childress Racing	Chevrolet
4	Kevin Harvick	Stewart–Haas Racing	Ford
5	Kasey Kahne	Hendrick Motorsports	Chevrolet
6	Trevor Bayne	Roush Fenway Racing	Ford
10	Danica Patrick	Stewart–Haas Racing	Ford
11	Denny Hamlin	Joe Gibbs Racing	Toyota
13	Ty Dillon (R)	Germain Racing	Chevrolet
14	Clint Bowyer	Stewart–Haas Racing	Ford
15	Reed Sorenson	Premium Motorsports	Chevrolet
17	Ricky Stenhouse Jr.	Roush Fenway Racing	Ford
18	Kyle Busch	Joe Gibbs Racing	Toyota
19	Daniel Suárez (R)	Joe Gibbs Racing	Toyota
20	Matt Kenseth	Joe Gibbs Racing	Toyota
21	Ryan Blaney	Wood Brothers Racing	Ford
22	Joey Logano	Team Penske	Ford
23	Gray Gaulding (R)	BK Racing	Toyota
24	Chase Elliott	Hendrick Motorsports	Chevrolet
27	Paul Menard	Richard Childress Racing	Chevrolet
31	Ryan Newman	Richard Childress Racing	Chevrolet
32	Matt DiBenedetto	Go Fas Racing	Ford
33	Jeffrey Earnhardt	Circle Sport – The Motorsports Group	Chevrolet
34	Landon Cassill	Front Row Motorsports	Ford
37	Chris Buescher	JTG Daugherty Racing	Chevrolet
38	David Ragan	Front Row Motorsports	Ford
41	Kurt Busch	Stewart–Haas Racing	Ford
42	Kyle Larson	Chip Ganassi Racing	Chevrolet
43	Aric Almirola	Richard Petty Motorsports	Ford
47	A. J. Allmendinger	JTG Daugherty Racing	Chevrolet
48	Jimmie Johnson	Hendrick Motorsports	Chevrolet
51	Timmy Hill (i)	Rick Ware Racing	Chevrolet
55	Derrike Cope	Premium Motorsports	Toyota
72	Cole Whitt	Tri-Star Motorsports	Chevrolet
77	Erik Jones (R)	Furniture Row Racing	Toyota
78	Martin Truex Jr.	Furniture Row Racing	Toyota
83	Corey LaJoie (R)	BK Racing	Toyota
88	Dale Earnhardt Jr.	Hendrick Motorsports	Chevrolet
95	Michael McDowell	Leavine Family Racing	Chevrolet
Official entry list

== Practice ==
=== First practice ===
Erik Jones was the fastest in the first practice session with a time of 15.009 seconds and a speed of 127.843 mph (205.743 km/h).

Pos	No.	Driver	Team	Manufacturer	Time	Speed
1	77	Erik Jones (R)	Furniture Row Racing	Toyota	15.009	127.843
2	18	Kyle Busch	Joe Gibbs Racing	Toyota	15.098	127.090
3	21	Ryan Blaney	Wood Brothers Racing	Ford	15.110	126.989
Official first practice results

=== Second practice ===
Kyle Busch was the fastest in the second practice session with a time of 14.890 seconds and a speed of 128.865 mph (207.388 km/h).

Pos	No.	Driver	Team	Manufacturer	Time	Speed
1	18	Kyle Busch	Joe Gibbs Racing	Toyota	14.890	128.865
2	77	Erik Jones (R)	Furniture Row Racing	Toyota	14.915	128.649
3	11	Denny Hamlin	Joe Gibbs Racing	Toyota	14.970	128.176
Official second practice results

=== Final practice ===
Kyle Busch was the fastest in the final practice session with a time of 14.925 and a speed of 128.563 mph (206.902 km/h).

Pos	No.	Driver	Team	Manufacturer	Time	Speed
1	18	Kyle Busch	Joe Gibbs Racing	Toyota	14.925	128.563
2	19	Daniel Suárez (R)	Joe Gibbs Racing	Toyota	14.960	128.262
3	5	Kasey Kahne	Hendrick Motorsports	Chevrolet	14.961	128.253
Official final practice results

== Qualifying ==
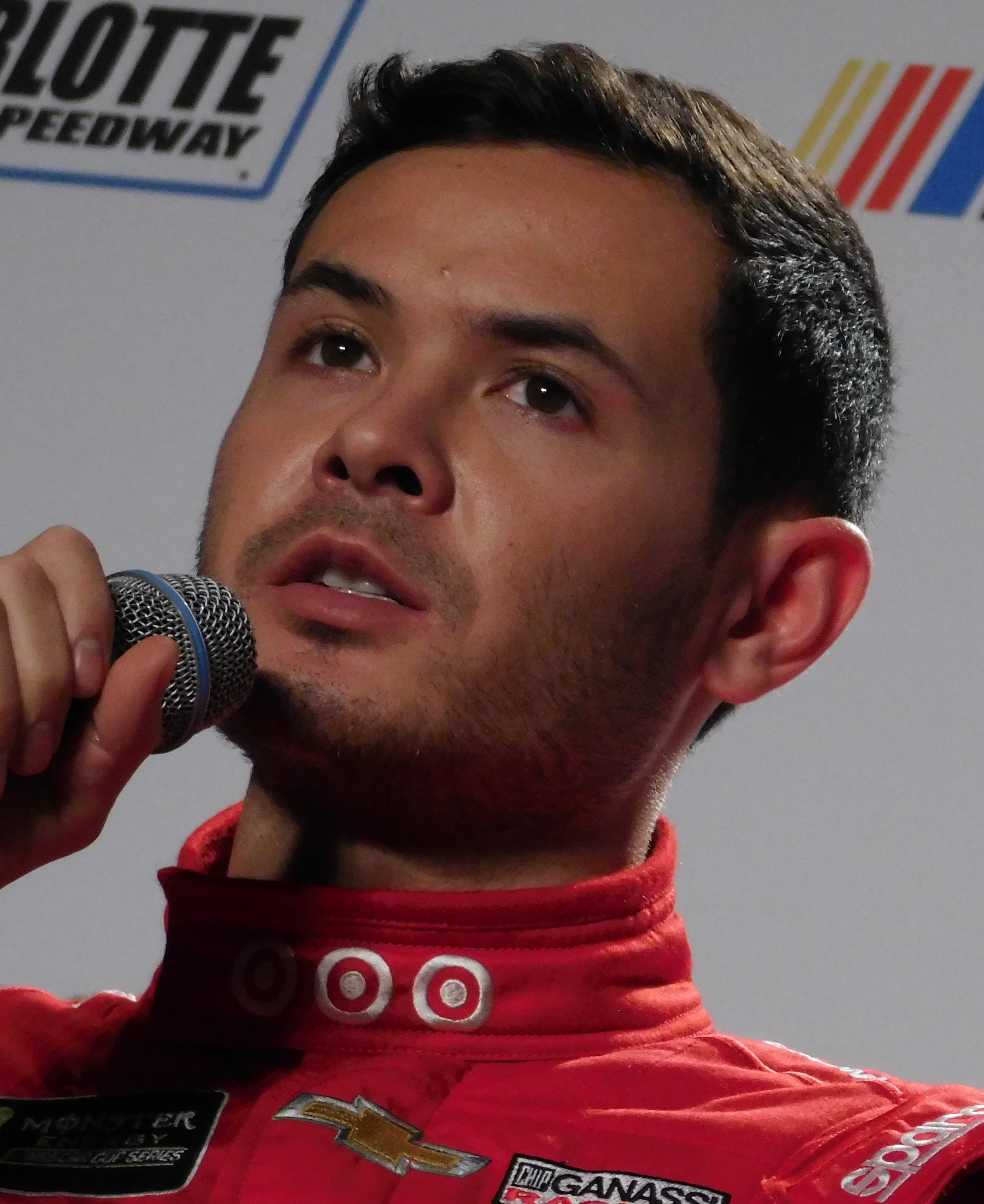
Kyle Larson won the pole.

Qualifying for Friday was cancelled due to rain and Kyle Larson, the point leader, was awarded the pole as a result.

=== Starting Lineup ===
Pos	No.	Driver	Team	Manufacturer
1	42	Kyle Larson	Chip Ganassi Racing	Chevrolet
2	24	Chase Elliott	Hendrick Motorsports	Chevrolet
3	78	Martin Truex Jr.	Furniture Row Racing	Toyota
4	2	Brad Keselowski	Team Penske	Ford
5	22	Joey Logano	Team Penske	Ford
6	21	Ryan Blaney	Wood Brothers Racing	Ford
7	18	Kyle Busch	Joe Gibbs Racing	Toyota
8	1	Jamie McMurray	Chip Ganassi Racing	Chevrolet
9	14	Clint Bowyer	Stewart–Haas Racing	Ford
10	4	Kevin Harvick	Stewart–Haas Racing	Ford
11	48	Jimmie Johnson	Hendrick Motorsports	Chevrolet
12	6	Trevor Bayne	Roush Fenway Racing	Ford
13	31	Ryan Newman	Richard Childress Racing	Chevrolet
14	77	Erik Jones (R)	Furniture Row Racing	Toyota
15	41	Kurt Busch	Stewart–Haas Racing	Ford
16	11	Denny Hamlin	Joe Gibbs Racing	Toyota
17	5	Kasey Kahne	Hendrick Motorsports	Chevrolet
18	43	Aric Almirola	Richard Petty Motorsports	Ford
19	17	Ricky Stenhouse Jr.	Roush Fenway Racing	Ford
20	88	Dale Earnhardt Jr.	Hendrick Motorsports	Chevrolet
21	3	Austin Dillon	Richard Childress Racing	Chevrolet
22	20	Matt Kenseth	Joe Gibbs Racing	Toyota
23	19	Daniel Suárez (R)	Joe Gibbs Racing	Toyota
24	13	Ty Dillon (R)	Germain Racing	Chevrolet
25	47	A. J. Allmendinger	JTG Daugherty Racing	Chevrolet
26	27	Paul Menard	Richard Childress Racing	Chevrolet
27	37	Chris Buescher	JTG Daugherty Racing	Chevrolet
28	95	Michael McDowell	Leavine Family Racing	Chevrolet
29	10	Danica Patrick	Stewart–Haas Racing	Ford
30	34	Landon Cassill	Front Row Motorsports	Ford
31	72	Cole Whitt	Tri-Star Motorsports	Chevrolet
32	32	Matt DiBenedetto	Go Fas Racing	Ford
33	38	David Ragan	Front Row Motorsports	Ford
34	15	Reed Sorenson	Premium Motorsports	Chevrolet
35	83	Corey LaJoie (R)	BK Racing	Toyota
36	23	Gray Gaulding (R)	BK Racing	Toyota
37	33	Jeffrey Earnhardt	Circle Sport – The Motorsports Group	Chevrolet
38	51	Timmy Hill (i)	Rick Ware Racing	Chevrolet
39	55	Derrike Cope	Premium Motorsports	Toyota
Official starting lineup

== Race ==
=== First stage ===
The race was scheduled to be held on Sunday, April 23, but rain delayed it to Monday, April 24.

Kyle Larson led the field to the green flag at 1:11 p.m. The first caution flew on lap 54 when Kurt Busch bounced off Trevor Bayne exiting Turn 4, slid down the front stretch and hit the inside wall. Chris Buescher slammed into the back of Reed Sorenson while slowing down to avoid Busch. Buescher went on to finish last. This brought out the red flag for five minutes and 10 seconds to facilitate cleanup in Turns 1 and 2.

The race restarted on lap 71. It remained green the remainder of the stage, that was won by Larson, and went back under caution on lap 125 for the end of the stage.

=== Second stage ===
The race restarted on lap 137. Martin Truex Jr. passed Larson in Turn 2 to take the lead on lap 202. The third caution flew on lap 210 when Kyle Busch suffered a right-front tire blowout and slammed the wall in Turn 2.

The race restarted on lap 217 and the fourth caution flew the same lap when Dale Earnhardt Jr. suffered a right-front tire failure and slammed the wall in Turn 1. “We broke something in the oil system and oil got onto the tires,” Earnhardt told USA TODAY Sports. “We got into the wall.” He added that his crew "said there was some oil in the pit stall after our pit stop. I noticed when I was getting lined up double file for the restart the car was smoking. I just thought maybe we had a tire rub for some reason, but I couldn't remember what might have caused that. And went into Turn 1 on the restart and the car went straight into the wall with oil all over the tires. Came into the garage there and they are working on where the hole in the system is. Just something is messed up, but that is going to be the finish for us."

The race restarted on lap 228. Truex won the second stage and the fifth caution flew for the conclusion of the stage. Landon Cassill opted not to pit and assumed the lead.

=== Final stage ===
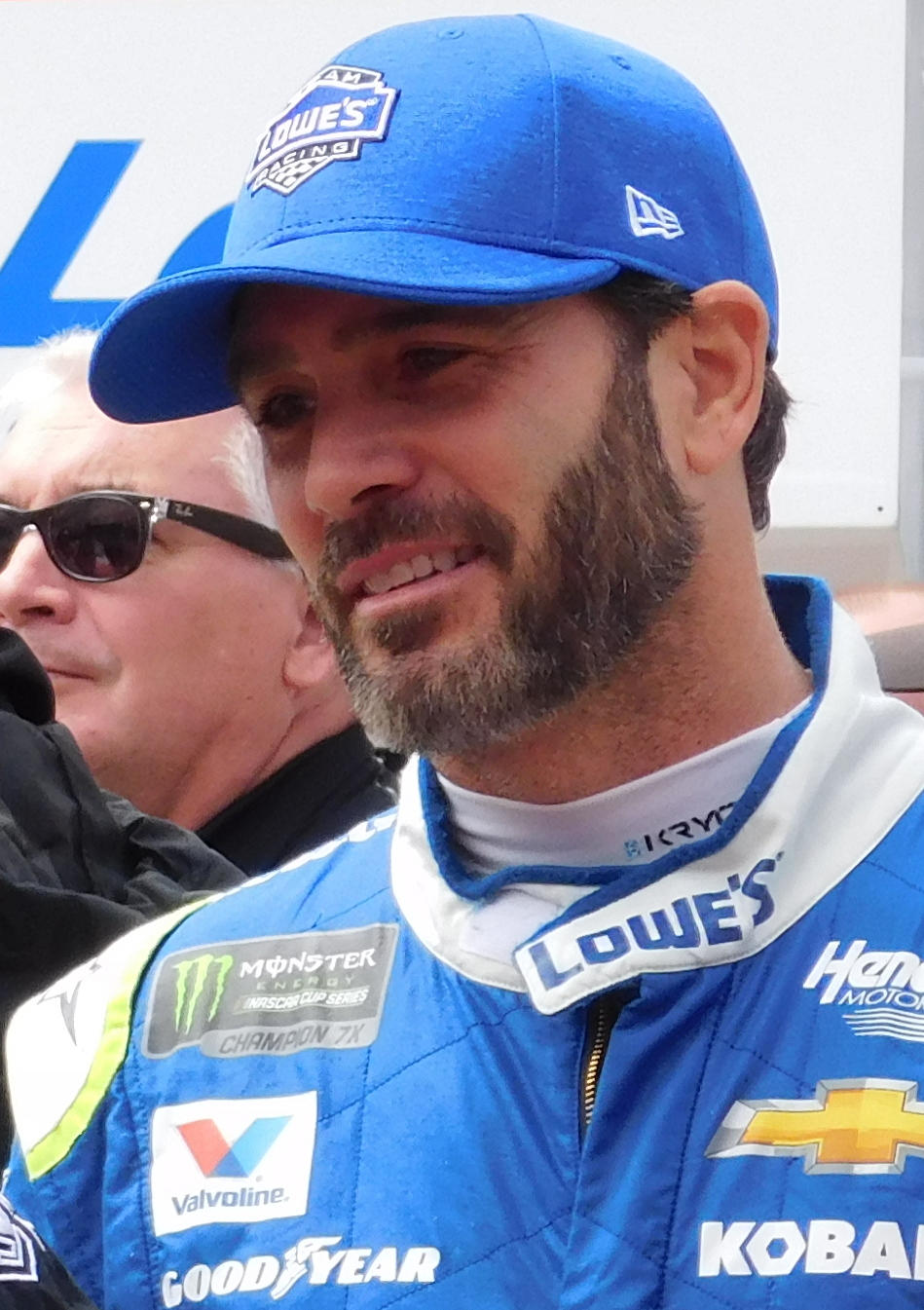
Jimmie Johnson won the race.

The race restarted on lap 260 and Truex passed Cassill with ease exiting Turn 2 to retake the lead. David Ragan attempted to pass through the middle of teammate Cassill on top and Danica Patrick on the bottom exiting Turn 2 on lap 323, but Patrick hit him and sent them both spinning into the backstretch wall, bringing out the sixth caution.

The race restarted on lap 329 and Joey Logano, restarting on the outside line, took the lead from Truex on the restart. The seventh caution flew with 116 laps to go when Busch suffered another right-front tire blowout and slammed the wall in Turn 3.

The race restarted with 110 to go. Jimmie Johnson made contact with Logano as he took the lead with 106 to go. The eighth caution flew with 80 to go when Erik Jones made contact with Gray Gaulding, cut his right-front tire and slammed the wall in Turn 3. A. J. Allmendinger clipped Jones's left-rear corner while trying to avoid him. Denny Hamlin assumed the lead by taking just 2 left side tires only. Larson restarted from the tail-end of the field for speeding on pit road.

The race restarted with 73 to go. Johnson took back the lead with 67 to go. The ninth caution flew with 37 to go when Kasey Kahne hit the wall in Turn 3 and was rear-ended by Paul Menard. Kevin Harvick took the lead by not pitting along with Hamlin who also did not pit. Truex exited pit road first and would've restarted third, but restarted from the tail-end of the field after he was busted for speeding on pit road.

The race restarted with 32 to go. Harvick held off challenges for his lead at first, but his old tires were no match for Johnson's four fresh tires and lost the lead to Johnson with 21 to go. Johnson drove on to score the victory.

== Post-race ==
=== Driver comments ===
“Yeah, it was kind of interesting because when the No. 42 (Kyle Larson) was there, it just created an environment to run the top and I wasn't as good on the top,” Johnson said in victory lane. “The No. 42, not being up there and that first couple of cars; the bottom was really where it was at for the short run. This Lowe's Chevrolet was flying! This track has been difficult over the years and we really hit on something Saturday afternoon in that last practice session around the bottom and honestly, it's what I've been looking for here for 16 years and we finally figured it out. So, I'm very, very happy.”

Clint Bowyer, who finished second, said of the final pit stop that he believed "the 48 (of Johnson) was the other one (to take four tires) and he won the race, so the right strategy was there. The team effort was there. You know, that's what a weekend is all about. It's just been this long since I've won a race and here is pretty special. It would have been pretty cool to be over there in Victory Lane."

== Race results ==
=== Stage results ===
Stage 1 Laps: 125

Pos	No	Driver	Team	Manufacturer	Points
1	42	Kyle Larson	Chip Ganassi Racing	Chevrolet	10
2	78	Martin Truex Jr.	Furniture Row Racing	Toyota	9
3	77	Erik Jones (R)	Furniture Row Racing	Toyota	8
4	22	Joey Logano	Team Penske	Ford	7
5	48	Jimmie Johnson	Hendrick Motorsports	Chevrolet	6
6	24	Chase Elliott	Hendrick Motorsports	Chevrolet	5
7	1	Jamie McMurray	Chip Ganassi Racing	Chevrolet	4
8	11	Denny Hamlin	Joe Gibbs Racing	Toyota	3
9	47	A. J. Allmendinger	JTG Daugherty Racing	Chevrolet	2
10	18	Kyle Busch	Joe Gibbs Racing	Toyota	1
Official stage one results

Stage 2 Laps: 125

Pos	No	Driver	Team	Manufacturer	Points
1	78	Martin Truex Jr.	Furniture Row Racing	Toyota	10
2	22	Joey Logano	Team Penske	Ford	9
3	48	Jimmie Johnson	Hendrick Motorsports	Chevrolet	8
4	4	Kevin Harvick	Stewart–Haas Racing	Ford	7
5	1	Jamie McMurray	Chip Ganassi Racing	Chevrolet	6
6	77	Erik Jones (R)	Furniture Row Racing	Toyota	5
7	42	Kyle Larson	Chip Ganassi Racing	Chevrolet	4
8	11	Denny Hamlin	Joe Gibbs Racing	Toyota	3
9	6	Trevor Bayne	Roush Fenway Racing	Ford	2
10	17	Ricky Stenhouse Jr.	Roush Fenway Racing	Ford	1
Official stage two results

=== Final stage results ===
Stage 3 Laps: 250

Pos	No	Driver	Team	Manufacturer	Laps	Points
1	48	Jimmie Johnson	Hendrick Motorsports	Chevrolet	500	54
2	14	Clint Bowyer	Stewart–Haas Racing	Ford	500	35
3	4	Kevin Harvick	Stewart–Haas Racing	Ford	500	41
4	20	Matt Kenseth	Joe Gibbs Racing	Toyota	500	33
5	22	Joey Logano	Team Penske	Ford	500	48
6	42	Kyle Larson	Chip Ganassi Racing	Chevrolet	500	45
7	24	Chase Elliott	Hendrick Motorsports	Chevrolet	500	35
8	78	Martin Truex Jr.	Furniture Row Racing	Toyota	500	48
9	17	Ricky Stenhouse Jr.	Roush Fenway Racing	Ford	500	29
10	11	Denny Hamlin	Joe Gibbs Racing	Toyota	500	33
11	6	Trevor Bayne	Roush Fenway Racing	Ford	500	28
12	1	Jamie McMurray	Chip Ganassi Racing	Chevrolet	500	35
13	3	Austin Dillon	Richard Childress Racing	Chevrolet	500	24
14	31	Ryan Newman	Richard Childress Racing	Chevrolet	500	23
15	13	Ty Dillon (R)	Germain Racing	Chevrolet	500	22
16	27	Paul Menard	Richard Childress Racing	Chevrolet	499	21
17	77	Erik Jones (R)	Furniture Row Racing	Toyota	499	33
18	19	Daniel Suárez (R)	Joe Gibbs Racing	Toyota	498	19
19	32	Matt DiBenedetto	Fas Lane Racing	Ford	498	18
20	5	Kasey Kahne	Hendrick Motorsports	Chevrolet	498	17
21	72	Cole Whitt	TriStar Motorsports	Chevrolet	498	16
22	43	Aric Almirola	Richard Petty Motorsports	Ford	497	15
23	38	David Ragan	Front Row Motorsports	Ford	497	14
24	83	Corey LaJoie (R)	BK Racing	Toyota	497	13
25	41	Kurt Busch	Stewart–Haas Racing	Ford	494	12
26	95	Michael McDowell	Leavine Family Racing	Chevrolet	494	11
27	33	Jeffrey Earnhardt	Circle Sport – The Motorsports Group	Chevrolet	491	10
28	15	Reed Sorenson	Premium Motorsports	Chevrolet	490	9
29	23	Gray Gaulding (R)	BK Racing	Toyota	487	8
30	47	A. J. Allmendinger	JTG Daugherty Racing	Chevrolet	482	9
31	55	Derrike Cope	Premium Motorsports	Toyota	465	6
32	34	Landon Cassill	Front Row Motorsports	Ford	458	5
33	21	Ryan Blaney	Wood Brothers Racing	Ford	452	4
34	2	Brad Keselowski	Team Penske	Ford	433	3
35	18	Kyle Busch	Joe Gibbs Racing	Toyota	383	3
36	10	Danica Patrick	Stewart–Haas Racing	Ford	320	1
37	51	Timmy Hill (i)	Rick Ware Racing	Chevrolet	234	0
38	88	Dale Earnhardt Jr.	Hendrick Motorsports	Chevrolet	218	1
39	37	Chris Buescher	JTG Daugherty Racing	Chevrolet	53	1
Official race results

=== Race statistics ===
- Lead changes: 7 among different drivers
- Cautions/Laps: 9 for 76
- Red flags: 1 for 5 minutes and 10 seconds
- Time of race: 3 hours, 4 minutes and 29 seconds
- Average speed: 86.674 miles per hour (139.488 km/h)

== Media ==
=== Television ===
Fox Sports covered their 17th race at the Bristol Motor Speedway. Mike Joy, five-time Bristol winner Jeff Gordon and 12-time Bristol winner – and all-time Bristol race winner – Darrell Waltrip had the call in the booth for the race. Jamie Little, Chris Neville, Vince Welch and Matt Yocum handled the pit road duties for the television side.

Fox Sports Television
Booth announcers	Pit reporters
Lap-by-lap: Mike Joy; Color-commentator: Jeff Gordon; Color commentator: Darrell Waltrip	Jamie Little; Chris Neville; Vince Welch; Matt Yocum

=== Radio ===
PRN had the radio call for the race which was also simulcasted on Sirius XM NASCAR Radio. Doug Rice, Mark Garrow and Wendy Venturini called the race in the booth when the field was racing down the frontstretch. Rob Albright called the race from atop the turn 3 suites when the field raced down the backstretch. Brad Gillie, Brett McMillan, Jim Noble, and Steve Richards covered the action on pit lane.

PRN Radio
Booth announcers	Turn announcers	Pit reporters
Lead announcer: Doug Rice; Announcer: Mark Garrow; Announcer: Wendy Venturini	Backstretch: Rob Albright	Brad Gillie; Brett McMillan; Jim Noble; Steve Richards

== Standings after the race ==
Drivers' Championship standings

	Pos	Driver	Points
	1	Kyle Larson	360
	2	Chase Elliott	333 (–27)
	3	Martin Truex Jr.	323 (–37)
1	4	Joey Logano	291 (–69)
1	5	Brad Keselowski	277 (–83)
5	6	Jimmie Johnson	244 (–116)
1	7	Jamie McMurray	244 (–116)
1	8	Clint Bowyer	239 (–121)
1	9	Kevin Harvick	239 (–121)
4	10	Ryan Blaney	228 (–132)
4	11	Kyle Busch	214 (–146)
2	12	Erik Jones	192 (–168)
1	13	Trevor Bayne	192 (–168)
1	14	Ryan Newman	186 (–174)
1	15	Denny Hamlin	184 (–176)
3	16	Ricky Stenhouse Jr.	168 (–192)
Official driver's standings

Manufacturers' Championship standings

Pos	Manufacturer	Points
1	Chevrolet	298
2	Ford	290 (–8)
3	Toyota	267 (–31)
Official manufacturers' standings

- Note: Only the first 16 positions are included for the driver standings.
- . – Driver has clinched a position in the Monster Energy NASCAR Cup Series playoffs.

Previous race: 2017 O'Reilly Auto Parts 500	Monster Energy NASCAR Cup Series; 2017 season	Next race: 2017 Toyota Owners 400
