= 2017 GEICO 500 =

Race details
- Race 10 of 36 in the 2017 Monster Energy NASCAR Cup Series
- Date: May 7, 2017
- Location: Talladega Superspeedway in Lincoln, Alabama
- Course: Permanent racing facility
- Course length: 2.66 miles (4.281 km)
- Distance: 191 laps, 508.06 mi (817.643 km)
- Scheduled distance: 188 laps, 500.08 mi (804.801 km)
- Average speed: 145.669 miles per hour (234.432 km/h)

Pole position
Driver	Ricky Stenhouse Jr.	Roush Fenway Racing
- Time: 49.993

Most laps led
Driver	Kyle Busch	Joe Gibbs Racing
- Laps: 48

Winner
No. 17	Ricky Stenhouse Jr.	Roush Fenway Racing

Television in the United States
- Network: Fox
- Announcers: Mike Joy, Jeff Gordon and Darrell Waltrip
- Nielsen ratings: 3.4/7 (Overnight); 3.5/8 (Final); 5.9 million viewers

Radio in the United States
- Radio: MRN
- Booth announcers: Joe Moore, Jeff Striegle and Rusty Wallace
- Turn announcers: Dave Moody (1 & 2), Mike Bagley (Backstretch) and Kyle Rickey (3 & 4)

The 2017 GEICO 500 was a Monster Energy NASCAR Cup Series race held on May 7, 2017, at Talladega Superspeedway in Lincoln, Alabama. Contested over 191 laps, extended from 188 laps due to overtime, on the 2.66-mile (4.28-kilometre) superspeedway, it was the 10th race of the 2017 Monster Energy NASCAR Cup Series season. Ricky Stenhouse Jr. won the race, his first career Monster Energy NASCAR Cup Series win, while Jamie McMurray finished second and Kyle Busch finished third.

== Entry list ==
No.	Driver	Team	Manufacturer
1	Jamie McMurray	Chip Ganassi Racing	Chevrolet
2	Brad Keselowski	Team Penske	Ford
3	Austin Dillon	Richard Childress Racing	Chevrolet
4	Kevin Harvick	Stewart–Haas Racing	Ford
5	Kasey Kahne	Hendrick Motorsports	Chevrolet
6	Trevor Bayne	Roush Fenway Racing	Ford
7	Elliott Sadler (i)	Tommy Baldwin Racing	Chevrolet
10	Danica Patrick	Stewart–Haas Racing	Ford
11	Denny Hamlin	Joe Gibbs Racing	Toyota
13	Ty Dillon (R)	Germain Racing	Chevrolet
14	Clint Bowyer	Stewart–Haas Racing	Ford
15	Joey Gase (i)	Premium Motorsports	Toyota
17	Ricky Stenhouse Jr.	Roush Fenway Racing	Ford
18	Kyle Busch	Joe Gibbs Racing	Toyota
19	Daniel Suárez (R)	Joe Gibbs Racing	Toyota
20	Matt Kenseth	Joe Gibbs Racing	Toyota
21	Ryan Blaney	Wood Brothers Racing	Ford
22	Joey Logano	Team Penske	Ford
23	Gray Gaulding (R)	BK Racing	Toyota
24	Chase Elliott	Hendrick Motorsports	Chevrolet
27	Paul Menard	Richard Childress Racing	Chevrolet
31	Ryan Newman	Richard Childress Racing	Chevrolet
32	Matt DiBenedetto	Go Fas Racing	Ford
33	Jeffrey Earnhardt	Circle Sport – The Motorsports Group	Chevrolet
34	Landon Cassill	Front Row Motorsports	Ford
37	Chris Buescher	JTG Daugherty Racing	Chevrolet
38	David Ragan	Front Row Motorsports	Ford
41	Kurt Busch	Stewart–Haas Racing	Ford
42	Kyle Larson	Chip Ganassi Racing	Chevrolet
43	Aric Almirola	Richard Petty Motorsports	Ford
47	A. J. Allmendinger	JTG Daugherty Racing	Chevrolet
48	Jimmie Johnson	Hendrick Motorsports	Chevrolet
55	Reed Sorenson	Premium Motorsports	Toyota
72	Cole Whitt	TriStar Motorsports	Ford
75	Brendan Gaughan (i)	Beard Motorsports	Chevrolet
77	Erik Jones (R)	Furniture Row Racing	Toyota
78	Martin Truex Jr.	Furniture Row Racing	Toyota
83	Corey LaJoie (R)	BK Racing	Toyota
88	Dale Earnhardt Jr.	Hendrick Motorsports	Chevrolet
95	Michael McDowell	Leavine Family Racing	Chevrolet
96	D. J. Kennington	Gaunt Brothers Racing	Toyota
Official entry list

== Practice ==
=== First practice ===
Clint Bowyer was the fastest in the first practice session with a time of 48.653 seconds and a speed of 196.822 mph (316.754 km/h).

Pos	No.	Driver	Team	Manufacturer	Time	Speed
1	14	Clint Bowyer	Stewart–Haas Racing	Ford	48.653	196.822
2	4	Kevin Harvick	Stewart–Haas Racing	Ford	48.748	196.439
3	2	Brad Keselowski	Team Penske	Ford	48.905	195.808
Official first practice results

=== Final practice ===
Final practice session for Friday was cancelled due to rain.

== Qualifying ==
Ricky Stenhouse Jr. scored the pole for the race with a time of 49.993 and a speed of 191.547 mph (308.265 km/h). Stenhouse said his crew "worked really, really hard on these cars. Like I said earlier, Jimmy Fennig has done a great job on these speedway cars. This is cool. Doug Yates builds awesome horsepower. With his dad, Robert, not doing as well as we would like, it would be cool to dedicate this one to him and all the hard work that the engine shop does. Man, it’s a cool way to start the weekend. I’m ready to get to Sunday."

=== Qualifying results ===
Pos	No.	Driver	Team	Manufacturer	R1	R2
1	17	Ricky Stenhouse Jr.	Roush Fenway Racing	Ford	50.180	49.993
2	88	Dale Earnhardt Jr.	Hendrick Motorsports	Chevrolet	50.294	50.194
3	2	Brad Keselowski	Team Penske	Ford	50.338	50.287
4	20	Matt Kenseth	Joe Gibbs Racing	Toyota	50.425	50.353
5	6	Trevor Bayne	Roush Fenway Racing	Ford	50.424	50.359
6	4	Kevin Harvick	Stewart–Haas Racing	Ford	50.552	50.394
7	19	Daniel Suárez (R)	Joe Gibbs Racing	Toyota	50.448	50.397
8	24	Chase Elliott	Hendrick Motorsports	Chevrolet	50.348	50.421
9	27	Paul Menard	Richard Childress Racing	Chevrolet	50.545	50.495
10	18	Kyle Busch	Joe Gibbs Racing	Toyota	50.483	50.511
11	11	Denny Hamlin	Joe Gibbs Racing	Toyota	50.562	50.541
12	22	Joey Logano	Team Penske	Ford	50.546	50.646
13	78	Martin Truex Jr.	Furniture Row Racing	Toyota	50.573	—
14	77	Erik Jones (R)	Furniture Row Racing	Toyota	50.583	—
15	41	Kurt Busch	Stewart–Haas Racing	Ford	50.590	—
16	21	Ryan Blaney	Wood Brothers Racing	Ford	50.598	—
17	14	Clint Bowyer	Stewart–Haas Racing	Ford	50.657	—
18	3	Austin Dillon	Richard Childress Racing	Chevrolet	50.657	—
19	5	Kasey Kahne	Hendrick Motorsports	Chevrolet	50.661	—
20	31	Ryan Newman	Richard Childress Racing	Chevrolet	50.677	—
21	42	Kyle Larson	Chip Ganassi Racing	Chevrolet	50.815	—
22	43	Aric Almirola	Richard Petty Motorsports	Ford	50.843	—
23	1	Jamie McMurray	Chip Ganassi Racing	Chevrolet	50.877	—
24	95	Michael McDowell	Leavine Family Racing	Chevrolet	50.963	—
25	34	Landon Cassill	Front Row Motorsports	Ford	50.968	—
26	32	Matt DiBenedetto	Go Fas Racing	Ford	50.992	—
27	47	A. J. Allmendinger	JTG Daugherty Racing	Chevrolet	50.997	—
28	13	Ty Dillon (R)	Germain Racing	Chevrolet	51.095	—
29	38	David Ragan	Front Row Motorsports	Ford	51.098	—
30	48	Jimmie Johnson	Hendrick Motorsports	Chevrolet	51.110	—
31	10	Danica Patrick	Stewart–Haas Racing	Ford	51.210	—
32	75	Brendan Gaughan (i)	Beard Motorsports	Chevrolet	51.441	—
33	55	Reed Sorenson	Premium Motorsports	Toyota	51.451	—
34	37	Chris Buescher	JTG Daugherty Racing	Chevrolet	51.471	—
35	7	Elliott Sadler (i)	Tommy Baldwin Racing	Chevrolet	51.513	—
36	83	Corey LaJoie (R)	BK Racing	Toyota	51.722	—
37	23	Gray Gaulding (R)	BK Racing	Toyota	51.995	—
38	72	Cole Whitt	TriStar Motorsports	Chevrolet	52.098	—
39	15	Joey Gase (i)	Premium Motorsports	Toyota	52.227	—
40	33	Jeffrey Earnhardt	Circle Sport – The Motorsports Group	Chevrolet	52.414	—
Did not qualify
41	96	D. J. Kennington	Gaunt Brothers Racing	Toyota	52.074	—
Official qualifying results

== Race ==
=== First stage ===
Ricky Stenhouse Jr. led the field to the green flag at 2:20 p.m. He led the first 14 laps before trash on his grille forced him to give up the lead to remove said trash, handing the lead to Brad Keselowski on lap 15. The first caution of the race flew on lap 17 when Kyle Larson, two laps after he made contact with the wall exiting Turn 2, thanks to an awkward push from teammate Jamie McMurray, suffered a right-front tire cut and slammed the wall in Turn 1. Ryan Newman opted not to pit and assumed the race lead, but pitted the following lap and handed the lead to Clint Bowyer.

The race restarted on lap 21. By lap 25, there were three lines battling for the lead. Kyle Busch rode a push from the top line to take the lead exiting Turn 2 on lap 28. Keselowski edged out Busch at the line to retake the lead on lap 34. Denny Hamlin made an unscheduled stop on lap 48 for a vibration. Teammates Daniel Suárez and Matt Kenseth attempted to pit with 3 to go, but did not make it onto pit road before the leader crossed the start/finish line for 2-to-go, at which point pit road is closed. As a result, they were issued pass-through penalties for "pitting too soon" (pitting when pit road is closed). Keselowski won the first stage as the second caution flew for the end of the stage on lap 55. Ty Dillon opted not to pit and assumed the lead, but pitted the following lap and the lead cycled to Hamlin.

=== Second stage ===
The race restarted on lap 62. Hamlin received a real challenge for the lead on lap 79 from teammate Busch and lost it to him on lap 81. The third caution flew the following lap when Reed Sorenson suffered a right-front tire blowout and slammed the wall in the tri-oval. He could not continue and went on to finish 40th.

The race restarted on lap 87. Bowyer edged out Newman at the line to retake the lead on lap 90. Hamlin edged out Bowyer at the line to retake the lead two laps later and drove on to win the second stage as the fourth caution flew for the end of the stage at lap 110. Kenseth opted not to pit and assumed the lead.

=== Final stage ===
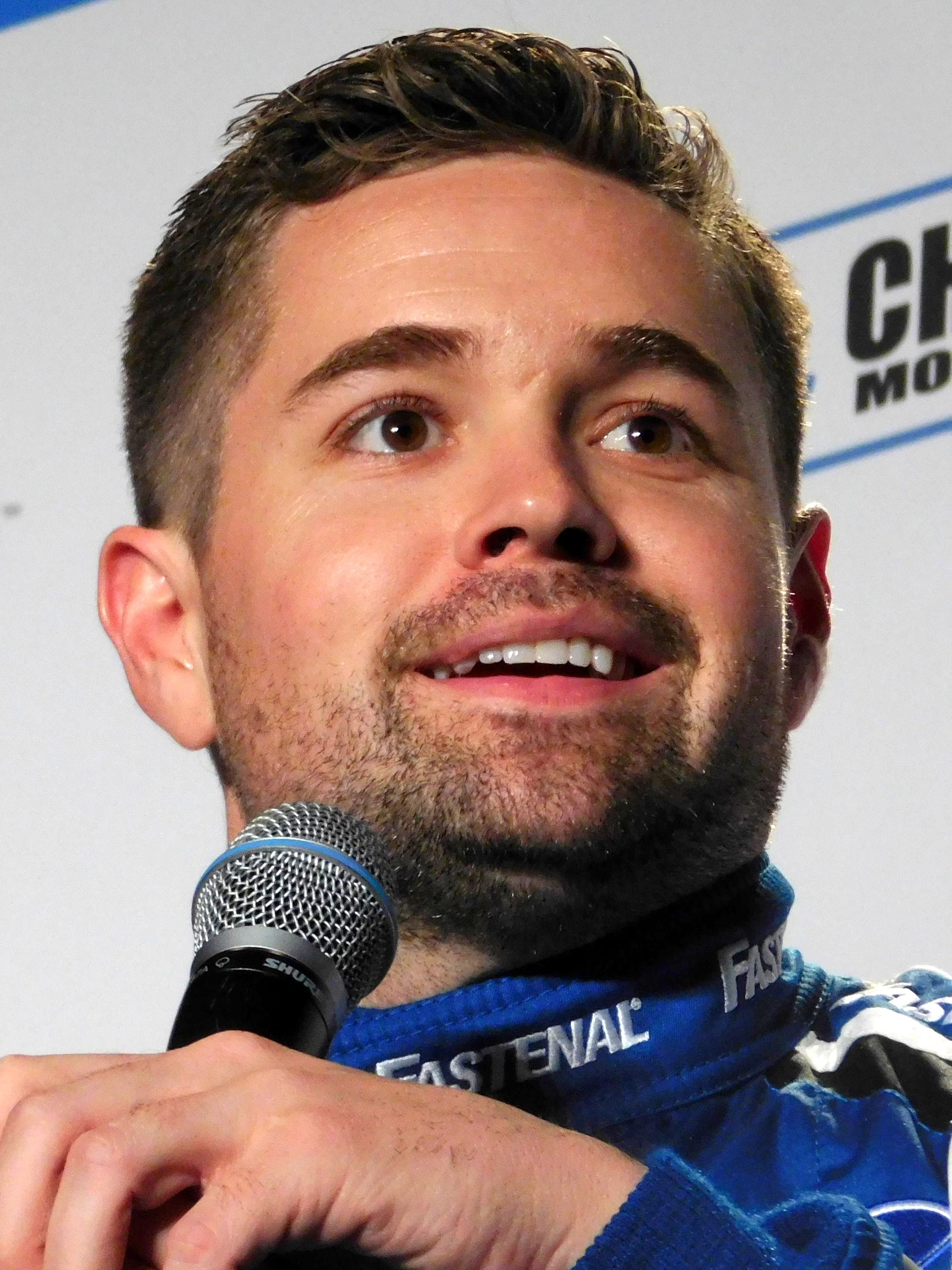
Ricky Stenhouse Jr. scored his first career win from the pole position.

The race restarted with 72 laps to go. From 70 to go to 65 to go, the lead changed five times: Hamlin (70), Keselowski (69), Hamlin (68), Keselowski (67) and Kevin Harvick (65). Jimmie Johnson took the lead with 59 to go. Harvick edged out Johnson at the line to retake the lead with 55 to go. Joey Logano took the lead exiting Turn 2 with 49 to go. A number of cars hit pit road under green with 45 to go. Logano pitted with 40 to go, handing the lead to Elliott Sadler. Sadler pitted the following lap and the lead cycled to Kyle Busch.

The fifth caution flew with 28 to go when Ryan Blaney was turned on the backstretch, by contact from Stenhouse, and collected the outside wall. Blaney made it back to the pits, but had heavy damage that could not be fixed within the 5-minute "crash clock", relegating him to a 39th-place finish.

The race restarted with 23 to go. With 20 to go, A. J. Allmendinger was giving Chase Elliott a push exiting Turn 2 when he turned Elliott's car up the track, triggering a multi-car wreck (known as "The Big One") and bringing out the sixth caution (which also brought out a 26-minute and 51-second red flag for cleanup). Contact from Logano's car lifted Elliott's car into the air, which then rode the steel barrier of the outside retaining wall before coming back down to the ground. Allmendinger's car was also turned upside down as a result of the 16-car wreck on the backstretch. Elliott said afterwards that Allmendinger apologized. "I don't know that it was really his fault, per se. He had a big run and he kind of got to my bumper and just happened to be in a bad spot coming up off the corner, skewed a little bit to my left rear. And when that happens, it just unloads these cars too much." Allmendinger said afterwards that he "barely tapped (Elliott). And then I tried to get off him but at that point it was too late. It was just one of those things battling for the lead. The plan kind of went. We waited at the back and started moving forward. I hated that happened, but it’s Talladega. I’m not a big fan of it, but if you’re up front and you’ve got a chance to go for it, racing happens I guess, here.”

The race restarted with 15 to go. Busch took back the lead on the restart and Dale Earnhardt Jr., who was running third, dropped off the pace due to a loose tire. Earnhardt said that the loose wheel "was pretty bad. We were about to wreck. And we were lucky to get to pit road and get it changed. The left rear tire come loose. We didn’t change it on the last stop but the glue build-up on the stud didn’t allow them to get the tire tight and it just kind of worked its way loose. We only had one nut tight when we come down pit road. It was real close to coming off." The seventh caution flew with 10 to go for Landon Cassill, who had broken a drive shaft and was unable to coast off the track.

The race restarted with seven to go. The eighth caution flew with three to go after Bowyer, on the inside of a three-wide battle, made contact with Chris Buescher, who then made contact with Newman. Newman spun toward the inside wall, and though he corrected the spin, he made heavy contact with the inside wall and was unable to continue.

==== Overtime ====
The race restarted in overtime with two to go. Busch and Stenhouse were side by side coming to the white flag, with Busch edging out Stenhouse, but Stenhouse took the lead exiting Turn 2 and held off McMurray and Busch to drive on to score the victory and his first Monster Energy NASCAR Cup Series win ever.

== Post-race ==
=== Driver comments ===
Stenhouse said in victory lane that the win was "a long time coming. We’ve run really well here at Talladega. This is the closest race track to home. I got a lot of cheers riding around here today and the fans were awesome. We had a lot packed in here at Talladega and it felt old-school. Man, to finally get that win for Jack (Roush) and everyone on our team is really special.”

Jamie McMurray, who threaded the needle between Busch and Johnson exiting Turn 2 on the final lap and edged Busch at the line to claim a runner-up finish, said "it’s really circumstantial as to what the guys do in front of you and what is happening behind you. I just got a run at the right time. I thought the No. 17 (Stenhouse) was going to get a little bit further out, but when we were coming to the line it just seemed like his car wasn’t going at that point, so it was a good finish. It was a great race. I’m glad everybody is okay, that was a really scary wreck on the backstretch, but really good day for our McDonald’s Chevrolet. We had good pit stops and the guys did a great job.”

Busch, who led a race high of 48 laps on his way to a third-place finish, said Stenhouse "got a run from behind off Turn 2, and I don't know what his help was or anything like that but he actually ran into the back of me, and then you'd think that that momentum would propel me forward some, and he just turned left and went right by. That was pretty impressive, I guess -- or I was just that slow and in his way. We did all we could here today and it's all circumstantial on how you win these things. Unfortunately our circumstances didn't quite go our way, but we go to a real race track (Kansas) next week and we'll try to win there."

== Race results ==
=== Stage results ===
Stage 1 Laps: 55

Pos	No	Driver	Team	Manufacturer	Points
1	2	Brad Keselowski	Team Penske	Ford	10
2	17	Ricky Stenhouse Jr.	Roush Fenway Racing	Ford	9
3	18	Kyle Busch	Joe Gibbs Racing	Toyota	8
4	78	Martin Truex Jr.	Furniture Row Racing	Toyota	7
5	6	Trevor Bayne	Roush Fenway Racing	Ford	6
6	22	Joey Logano	Team Penske	Ford	5
7	27	Paul Menard	Richard Childress Racing	Chevrolet	4
8	10	Danica Patrick	Stewart–Haas Racing	Ford	3
9	21	Ryan Blaney	Wood Brothers Racing	Ford	2
10	77	Erik Jones (R)	Furniture Row Racing	Toyota	1
Official stage one results

Stage 2 Laps: 55

Pos	No	Driver	Team	Manufacturer	Points
1	11	Denny Hamlin	Joe Gibbs Racing	Toyota	10
2	4	Kevin Harvick	Stewart–Haas Racing	Ford	9
3	21	Ryan Blaney	Wood Brothers Racing	Ford	8
4	78	Martin Truex Jr.	Furniture Row Racing	Toyota	7
5	48	Jimmie Johnson	Hendrick Motorsports	Chevrolet	6
6	42	Kyle Larson	Chip Ganassi Racing	Chevrolet	5
7	41	Kurt Busch	Stewart–Haas Racing	Ford	4
8	5	Kasey Kahne	Hendrick Motorsports	Chevrolet	3
9	77	Erik Jones (R)	Furniture Row Racing	Toyota	2
10	1	Jamie McMurray	Chip Ganassi Racing	Chevrolet	1
Official stage two results

=== Final stage results ===
Stage 3 Laps: 81

Pos	Grid	No	Driver	Team	Manufacturer	Laps	Points
1	1	17	Ricky Stenhouse Jr.	Roush Fenway Racing	Ford	191	49
2	23	1	Jamie McMurray	Chip Ganassi Racing	Chevrolet	191	36
3	10	18	Kyle Busch	Joe Gibbs Racing	Toyota	191	42
4	22	43	Aric Almirola	Richard Petty Motorsports	Ford	191	33
5	19	5	Kasey Kahne	Hendrick Motorsports	Chevrolet	191	35
6	15	41	Kurt Busch	Stewart–Haas Racing	Ford	191	35
7	3	2	Brad Keselowski	Team Penske	Ford	191	40
8	30	48	Jimmie Johnson	Hendrick Motorsports	Chevrolet	191	35
9	9	27	Paul Menard	Richard Childress Racing	Chevrolet	191	32
10	29	38	David Ragan	Front Row Motorsports	Ford	191	27
11	11	11	Denny Hamlin	Joe Gibbs Racing	Toyota	191	36
12	21	42	Kyle Larson	Chip Ganassi Racing	Chevrolet	191	30
13	28	13	Ty Dillon (R)	Germain Racing	Chevrolet	191	24
14	17	14	Clint Bowyer	Stewart–Haas Racing	Ford	191	23
15	34	37	Chris Buescher	JTG Daugherty Racing	Chevrolet	191	22
16	38	72	Cole Whitt	TriStar Motorsports	Chevrolet	191	21
17	35	7	Elliott Sadler (i)	Tommy Baldwin Racing	Chevrolet	191	0
18	26	32	Matt DiBenedetto	Go Fas Racing	Ford	191	19
19	7	19	Daniel Suárez (R)	Joe Gibbs Racing	Toyota	191	18
20	37	23	Gray Gaulding (R)	BK Racing	Toyota	191	17
21	39	15	Joey Gase (i)	Premium Motorsports	Toyota	191	0
22	2	88	Dale Earnhardt Jr.	Hendrick Motorsports	Chevrolet	191	15
23	6	4	Kevin Harvick	Stewart–Haas Racing	Ford	191	23
24	4	20	Matt Kenseth	Joe Gibbs Racing	Toyota	190	13
25	20	31	Ryan Newman	Richard Childress Racing	Chevrolet	185	12
26	32	75	Brendan Gaughan (i)	Beard Motorsports	Chevrolet	183	0
27	36	83	Corey LaJoie (R)	BK Racing	Toyota	183	10
28	40	33	Jeffrey Earnhardt	Circle Sport – The Motorsports Group	Chevrolet	174	9
29	25	34	Landon Cassill	Front Row Motorsports	Ford	173	8
30	8	24	Chase Elliott	Hendrick Motorsports	Chevrolet	168	7
31	27	47	A. J. Allmendinger	JTG Daugherty Racing	Chevrolet	168	6
32	12	22	Joey Logano	Team Penske	Ford	168	10
33	14	77	Erik Jones (R)	Furniture Row Racing	Toyota	168	7
34	24	95	Michael McDowell	Leavine Family Racing	Chevrolet	168	3
35	13	78	Martin Truex Jr.	Furniture Row Racing	Toyota	168	16
36	18	3	Austin Dillon	Richard Childress Racing	Chevrolet	168	1
37	5	6	Trevor Bayne	Roush Fenway Racing	Ford	168	7
38	31	10	Danica Patrick	Stewart–Haas Racing	Ford	168	4
39	16	21	Ryan Blaney	Wood Brothers Racing	Ford	160	11
40	33	55	Reed Sorenson	Premium Motorsports	Toyota	72	1
Official race results

=== Race statistics ===
- Lead changes: 26 among 14 different drivers
- Cautions/Laps: 8 for 33 laps
- Red flags: 1 for 26 minutes and 51 seconds
- Time of race: 3 hours, 29 minutes and 16 seconds
- Average speed: 145.669 miles per hour (234.432 km/h)

== Media ==
=== Television ===
Fox Sports covered their 17th race at Talladega Superspeedway. Mike Joy, six-time Talladega winner – and all-time restrictor plate race wins record holder – Jeff Gordon and four-time Talladega winner Darrell Waltrip called the race in the broadcast booth, while Jamie Little, Chris Neville, Vince Welch and Matt Yocum handled pit road duties.

Fox Television
Booth announcers	Pit reporters
Lap-by-lap: Mike Joy; Color commentator: Jeff Gordon; Color commentator: Darrell Waltrip	Jamie Little; Chris Neville; Vince Welch; Matt Yocum

=== Radio ===
MRN had the radio call for the race, which was also simulcast on SiriusXM's NASCAR Radio channel. Joe Moore, Jeff Striegle and Rusty Wallace called the race in the booth when the field raced through the tri-oval. Dave Moody called the race from the Sunoco spotters' stand outside turn 2 when the field raced through turns 1 and 2. Mike Bagley called the race from a platform inside the backstretch when the field raced down the backstretch. Kyle Rickey called the race from the Sunoco spotters' stand outside turn 4 when the field raced through turns 3 and 4. Alex Hayden, Winston Kelley, Kim Coon, and Steve Post worked pit road.

MRN Radio
Booth announcers	Turn announcers	Pit reporters
Lead announcer: Joe Moore; Announcer: Jeff Striegle; Announcer: Rusty Wallace	Turns 1 & 2: Dave Moody; Backstretch: Mike Bagley; Turns 3 & 4: Kyle Rickey	Alex Hayden; Winston Kelley; Kim Coon; Steve Post

== Standings after the race ==
Drivers' Championship standings

	Pos	Driver	Points
	1	Kyle Larson	428
	2	Martin Truex Jr.	374 (–54)
2	3	Brad Keselowski	367 (–61)
1	4	Chase Elliott	353 (–75)
2	5	Jamie McMurray	318 (–110)
2	6	Joey Logano	318 (–110)
1	7	Kevin Harvick	309 (–119)
	8	Jimmie Johnson	305 (–123)
	9	Clint Bowyer	289 (–139)
	10	Kyle Busch	277 (–151)
	11	Denny Hamlin	267 (–161)
3	12	Ricky Stenhouse Jr.	250 (–178)
1	13	Ryan Blaney	240 (–188)
1	14	Ryan Newman	237 (–191)
2	15	Kurt Busch	227 (–201)
2	16	Trevor Bayne	223 (–205)
Official driver's standings

Manufacturers' Championship standings

Pos	Manufacturer	Points
1	Ford	365
2	Chevrolet	364 (–1)
3	Toyota	335 (–30)
Official manufacturers' standings

- Note: Only the first 16 positions are included for the driver standings.
- . – Driver has clinched a position in the Monster Energy NASCAR Cup Series playoffs.

Previous race: 2017 Toyota Owners 400	Monster Energy NASCAR Cup Series; 2017 season	Next race: 2017 Go Bowling 400
