= 2017 Toyota Owners 400 =

Race details
- Race 9 of 36 in the 2017 Monster Energy NASCAR Cup Series
- Date: April 30, 2017
- Location: Richmond International Raceway in Richmond, Virginia
- Course: Permanent racing facility
- Course length: 0.75 miles (1.2 km)
- Distance: 400 laps, 300 mi (480 km)
- Average speed: 93.685 miles per hour (150.771 km/h)

Pole position
Driver	Matt Kenseth	Joe Gibbs Racing
- Time: 22.300

Most laps led
Driver	Matt Kenseth	Joe Gibbs Racing
- Laps: 164

Winner
No. 22	Joey Logano	Team Penske

Television in the United States
- Network: Fox
- Announcers: Mike Joy, Jeff Gordon and Darrell Waltrip
- Nielsen ratings: 2.7/6 (Overnight); 2.9/6 (Final); 4.6 million viewers

Radio in the United States
- Radio: MRN
- Booth announcers: Joe Moore, Jeff Striegle and Rusty Wallace
- Turn announcers: Mike Bagley (Backstretch)

The 2017 Toyota Owners 400 was a Monster Energy NASCAR Cup Series race held on April 30, 2017, at Richmond International Raceway in Richmond, Virginia. Contested over 400 laps on the 0.75 mile (1.2 km) asphalt short track, it was the ninth race of the 2017 Monster Energy NASCAR Cup Series season.

Joey Logano won the race, his 18th career win in the Monster Energy NASCAR Cup Series, having done it from the rear of the field. This race was his 300th Cup Series start. However, on May 4, 2017, due to a rear suspension issue, Logano's win was encumbered. It did not count as a ticket to the Playoffs, which ultimately cost Logano a berth in the post-season, since he did not win again during the regular season nor point his way in.

== Entry list ==
No.	Driver	Team	Manufacturer
1	Jamie McMurray	Chip Ganassi Racing	Chevrolet
2	Brad Keselowski	Team Penske	Ford
3	Austin Dillon	Richard Childress Racing	Chevrolet
4	Kevin Harvick	Stewart–Haas Racing	Ford
5	Kasey Kahne	Hendrick Motorsports	Chevrolet
6	Trevor Bayne	Roush Fenway Racing	Ford
10	Danica Patrick	Stewart–Haas Racing	Ford
11	Denny Hamlin	Joe Gibbs Racing	Toyota
13	Ty Dillon (R)	Germain Racing	Chevrolet
14	Clint Bowyer	Stewart–Haas Racing	Ford
15	Reed Sorenson	Premium Motorsports	Chevrolet
17	Ricky Stenhouse Jr.	Roush Fenway Racing	Ford
18	Kyle Busch	Joe Gibbs Racing	Toyota
19	Daniel Suárez (R)	Joe Gibbs Racing	Toyota
20	Matt Kenseth	Joe Gibbs Racing	Toyota
21	Ryan Blaney	Wood Brothers Racing	Ford
22	Joey Logano	Team Penske	Ford
23	Gray Gaulding (R)	BK Racing	Toyota
24	Chase Elliott	Hendrick Motorsports	Chevrolet
27	Paul Menard	Richard Childress Racing	Chevrolet
31	Ryan Newman	Richard Childress Racing	Chevrolet
32	Matt DiBenedetto	Go Fas Racing	Ford
33	Jeffrey Earnhardt	Circle Sport – The Motorsports Group	Chevrolet
34	Landon Cassill	Front Row Motorsports	Ford
37	Chris Buescher	JTG Daugherty Racing	Chevrolet
38	David Ragan	Front Row Motorsports	Ford
41	Kurt Busch	Stewart–Haas Racing	Ford
42	Kyle Larson	Chip Ganassi Racing	Chevrolet
43	Aric Almirola	Richard Petty Motorsports	Ford
47	A. J. Allmendinger	JTG Daugherty Racing	Chevrolet
48	Jimmie Johnson	Hendrick Motorsports	Chevrolet
51	Timmy Hill (i)	Rick Ware Racing	Chevrolet
72	Cole Whitt	Tri-Star Motorsports	Chevrolet
77	Erik Jones (R)	Furniture Row Racing	Toyota
78	Martin Truex Jr.	Furniture Row Racing	Toyota
83	Corey LaJoie (R)	BK Racing	Toyota
88	Dale Earnhardt Jr.	Hendrick Motorsports	Chevrolet
95	Michael McDowell	Leavine Family Racing	Chevrolet
Official entry list

== Practice ==
=== First practice ===
Martin Truex Jr. was the fastest in the first practice session with a time of 21.743 seconds and a speed of 124.178 mph (199.845 km/h).

Pos	No.	Driver	Team	Manufacturer	Time	Speed
1	78	Martin Truex Jr.	Furniture Row Racing	Toyota	21.743	124.178
2	77	Erik Jones (R)	Furniture Row Racing	Toyota	21.945	123.035
3	21	Ryan Blaney	Wood Brothers Racing	Ford	21.992	122.772
Official first practice results

=== Second practice ===
Erik Jones was the fastest in the second practice session with a time of 22.367 seconds and a speed of 120.714 mph (194.270 km/h).

Pos	No.	Driver	Team	Manufacturer	Time	Speed
1	77	Erik Jones (R)	Furniture Row Racing	Toyota	22.367	120.714
2	4	Kevin Harvick	Stewart–Haas Racing	Chevrolet	22.491	120.048
3	27	Paul Menard	Richard Childress Racing	Chevrolet	22.499	120.005
Official second practice results

=== Final practice ===
Kyle Larson was the fastest in the final practice session with a time of 22.675 seconds and a speed of 119.074 mph (191.631 km/h).

Pos	No.	Driver	Team	Manufacturer	Time	Speed
1	42	Kyle Larson	Chip Ganassi Racing	Chevrolet	22.675	119.074
2	78	Martin Truex Jr.	Furniture Row Racing	Toyota	22.686	119.016
3	48	Jimmie Johnson	Hendrick Motorsports	Chevrolet	22.727	118.801
Official final practice results

== Qualifying ==
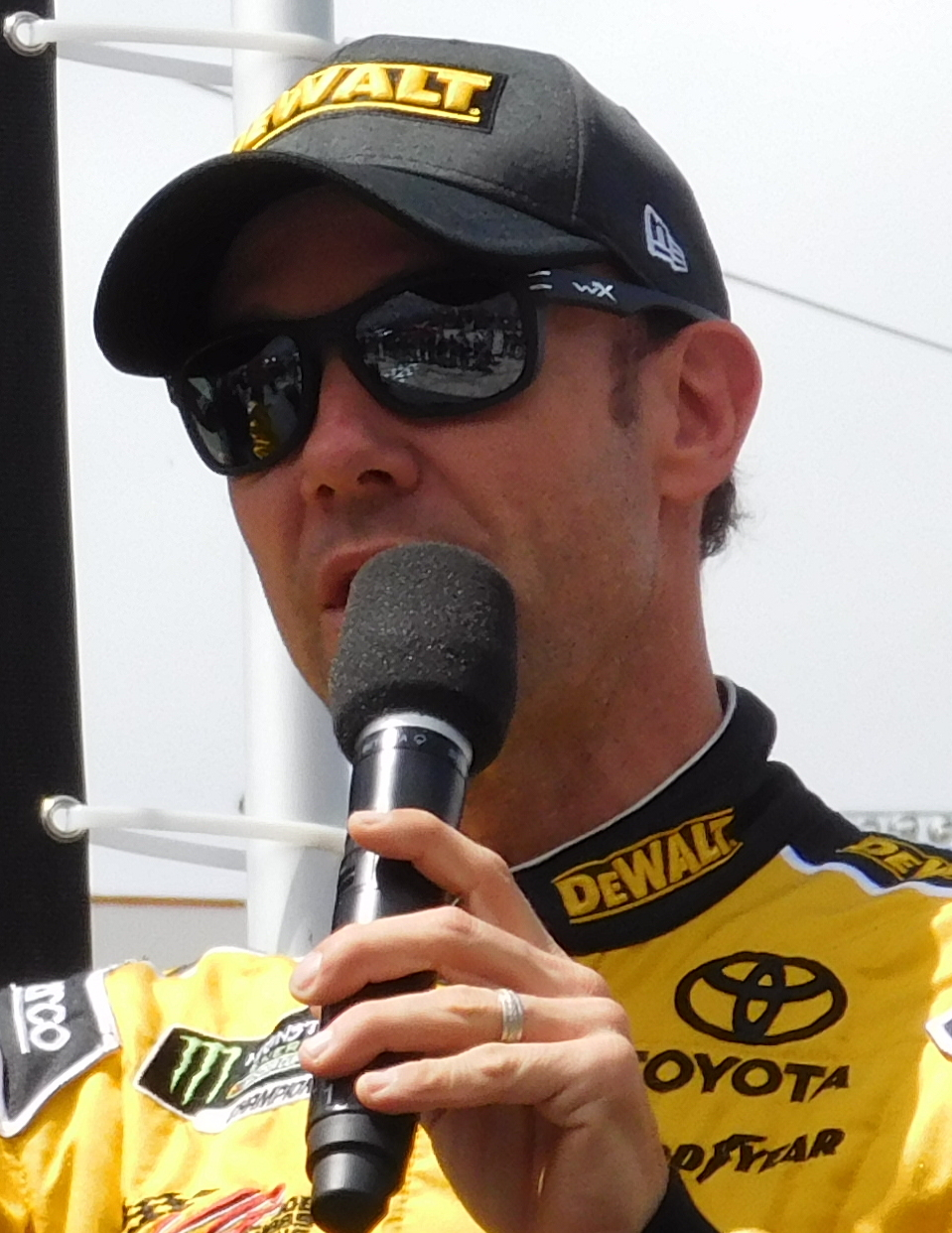
Matt Kenseth scored the pole position.

Matt Kenseth scored the pole for the race with a time of 22.300 and a speed of 121.076 mph (194.853 km/h).

=== Qualifying results ===
Pos	No.	Driver	Team	Manufacturer	R1	R2	R3
1	20	Matt Kenseth	Joe Gibbs Racing	Toyota	22.499	22.435	22.300
2	21	Ryan Blaney	Wood Brothers Racing	Ford	22.634	22.488	22.341
3	78	Martin Truex Jr.	Furniture Row Racing	Toyota	22.474	22.432	22.373
4	17	Ricky Stenhouse Jr.	Roush Fenway Racing	Ford	22.595	22.422	22.412
5	22	Joey Logano	Team Penske	Ford	22.338	22.228	22.429
6	4	Kevin Harvick	Stewart–Haas Racing	Ford	22.338	22.318	22.439
7	18	Kyle Busch	Joe Gibbs Racing	Toyota	22.517	22.482	22.468
8	14	Clint Bowyer	Stewart–Haas Racing	Ford	22.345	22.557	22.473
9	41	Kurt Busch	Stewart–Haas Racing	Ford	22.479	22.444	22.495
10	1	Jamie McMurray	Chip Ganassi Racing	Chevrolet	22.530	22.431	22.558
11	19	Daniel Suárez (R)	Joe Gibbs Racing	Toyota	22.649	22.541	22.672
12	88	Dale Earnhardt Jr.	Hendrick Motorsports	Chevrolet	22.636	22.526	22.689
13	31	Ryan Newman	Richard Childress Racing	Chevrolet	22.522	22.557	—
14	24	Chase Elliott	Hendrick Motorsports	Chevrolet	22.501	22.562	—
15	2	Brad Keselowski	Team Penske	Ford	22.508	22.562	—
16	11	Denny Hamlin	Joe Gibbs Racing	Toyota	22.419	22.563	—
17	48	Jimmie Johnson	Hendrick Motorsports	Chevrolet	22.368	22.568	—
18	42	Kyle Larson	Chip Ganassi Racing	Chevrolet	22.567	22.617	—
19	5	Kasey Kahne	Hendrick Motorsports	Chevrolet	22.627	22.646	—
20	77	Erik Jones (R)	Furniture Row Racing	Toyota	22.644	22.699	—
21	10	Danica Patrick	Stewart–Haas Racing	Ford	22.625	22.709	—
22	47	A. J. Allmendinger	JTG Daugherty Racing	Chevrolet	22.645	22.758	—
23	37	Chris Buescher	JTG Daugherty Racing	Chevrolet	22.547	22.797	—
24	13	Ty Dillon (R)	Germain Racing	Chevrolet	22.659	23.072	—
25	43	Aric Almirola	Richard Petty Motorsports	Ford	22.674	—	—
26	27	Paul Menard	Richard Childress Racing	Chevrolet	22.687	—	—
27	95	Michael McDowell	Leavine Family Racing	Chevrolet	22.705	—	—
28	34	Landon Cassill	Front Row Motorsports	Ford	22.715	—	—
29	6	Trevor Bayne	Roush Fenway Racing	Ford	22.728	—	—
30	38	David Ragan	Front Row Motorsports	Ford	22.810	—	—
31	23	Gray Gaulding (R)	BK Racing	Toyota	22.856	—	—
32	32	Matt DiBenedetto	Go Fas Racing	Ford	22.893	—	—
33	15	Reed Sorenson	Premium Motorsports	Chevrolet	23.001	—	—
34	83	Corey LaJoie (R)	BK Racing	Toyota	23.058	—	—
35	33	Jeffrey Earnhardt	Circle Sport – The Motorsports Group	Chevrolet	23.078	—	—
36	72	Cole Whitt	TriStar Motorsports	Chevrolet	23.089	—	—
37	51	Timmy Hill (i)	Rick Ware Racing	Chevrolet	23.238	—	—
38	3	Austin Dillon	Richard Childress Racing	Chevrolet	32.612	—	—
Official qualifying results

== Race ==
=== First stage ===
Matt Kenseth led the field to the green flag at 2:16 p.m. Erik Jones made contact with Kasey Kahne exiting Turn 2 on the first lap, leading to a left-front tire cut and slamming the wall on the seventh lap of the race. Jones, after being released from the infield care center, said he and Kahne, were "three-wide right on the start and then the 5 ran us up into the fence. I was trying not to wreck everybody and then a couple laps later the GameStop Prey Toyota Camry cut a left-front tire. It’s just really a heartbreaking day. It’s not what we wanted, but we’ll just have to come back next week with another fast race car and try to run up front again.” He went on to finish last.

The race restarted on lap 12. The second caution flew on lap 65 when Ricky Stenhouse Jr. made contact with the wall in Turn 3. Chris Buescher, Kyle Busch and Dale Earnhardt Jr. restarted from the tail-end of the field for speeding.

The race restarted on lap 72. Kenseth won the first stage and the third caution flew for the conclusion of the first stage.

=== Second stage ===
The race restarted on lap 110. Brad Keselowski passed Kenseth on the backstretch to take the lead on lap 164, won the second stage and the fourth caution flew for the conclusion of the second stage. Denny Hamlin exited pit road with the race lead. Jimmie Johnson restarted from the tail-end of the field for an uncontrolled tire.

=== Final stage ===
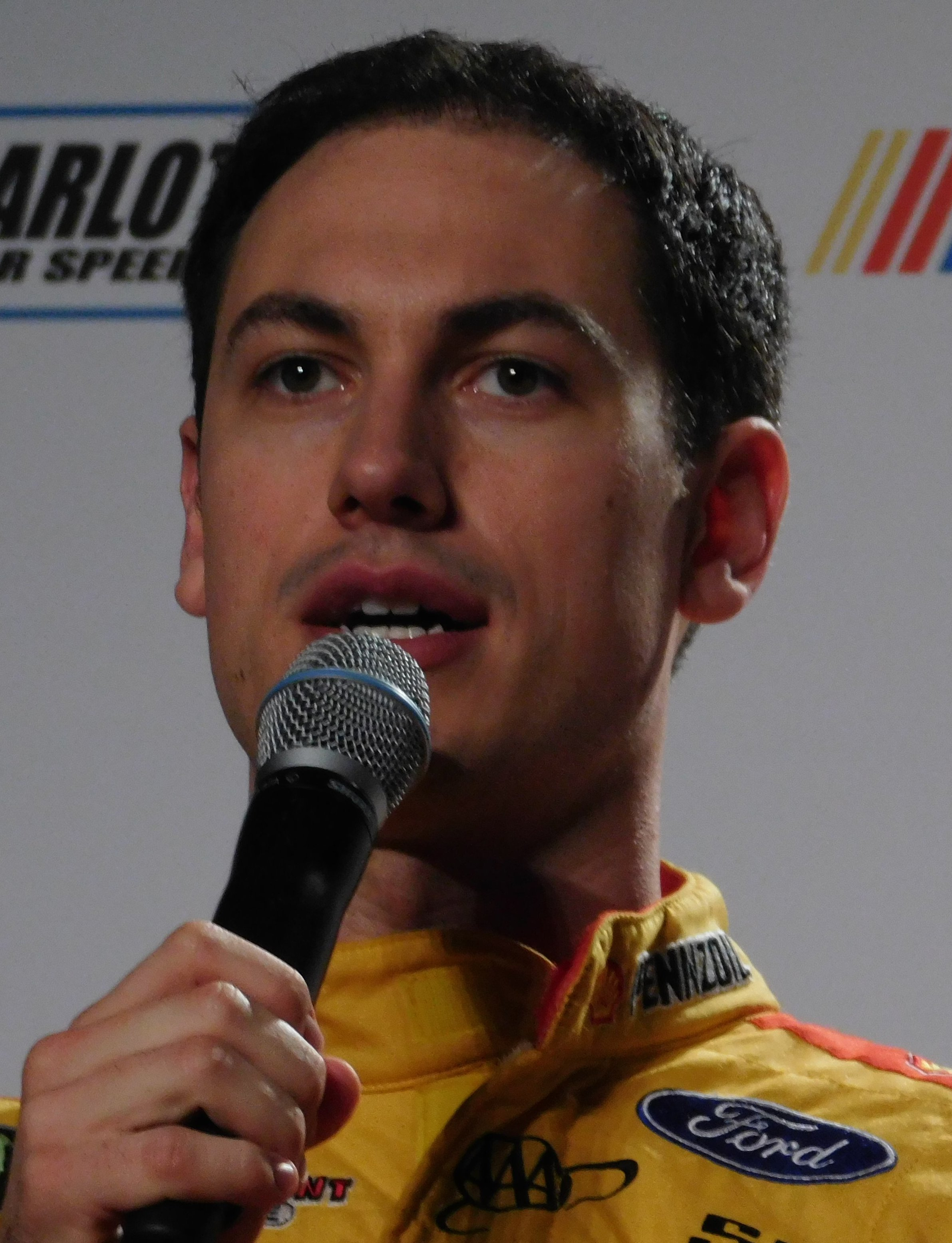
Joey Logano won the race, but failed post-race inspection.

The race restarted on lap 212 and Hamlin lost the lead to Keselowski on the restart. Kevin Harvick passed Keselowski for the lead with 170 laps to go. Keselowski drove past Harvick on the outside exiting Turn 2 to retake the lead with 162 to go. Debris in the restart zone, a towel, brought out the fifth caution with 150 to go. Hamlin exited pit road with the race lead Kasey Kahne restarted the race from the tail-end of the field for speeding.

The race restarted with 144 to go. Keselowski edged out Hamlin at the start/finish line to retake the lead with 113 to go. A number of cars hit pit road with 84 to go to start a cycle of green flag pit stops. Keselowski pitted from the lead with 81 to go, giving it to Ryan Newman. Exiting pit road with 57 to go, Johnson slammed into teammate Earnhardt exiting Turn 2 and brought out the sixth caution. Earnhardt told reporters after the race that Johnson "said he didn’t see us. We were out there running around the top and weren’t ready to pit yet, and he said that he didn’t get any notice that there was a car on the outside. ... Jimmie didn’t know I was there. Came off the corner and didn’t know I was there. It was an explosion. But the car held up pretty well.” Johnson said after the race that he was trying to decipher "if I just didn't hear it being told to me or if it wasn't told to me. It's still terrible, obviously. Man, I'm surprised our cars kept rolling after that because I just body-slammed him into the wall. And I could have easily not heard the clear or something else happened. I don't know. But that's the last thing you want to happen with a teammate.”

The race restarted with 51 to go. With 43 laps to go, Earnhardt suffered a left-rear tire cut and spun out in Turn 3, bringing out the seventh caution. During the caution, Ty Dillon spun out entering Turn 3 in front of Clint Bowyer. Hamlin exited pit road with the race lead.

The race restarted with 39 to go and Keselowski took the lead on the ensuing lap. Kenseth made contact with Chase Elliott in Turn 1 and his right-rear tire went flat with 38 to go. Debris brought out the eighth caution with 33 to go. Keselowski and Logano stayed out while the rest of the drivers pitted. Martin Truex Jr. restarted from the tail-end of the field for a commitment line violation.

The race restarted with 30 to go and Joey Logano passed Keselowski exiting Turn 2 on the ensuing lap to take the lead. The ninth caution flew with 24 to go when Ryan Blaney made contact with Kurt Busch exiting Turn 2, suffered a cut left-rear tire, spun out and slammed the wall in Turn 3. Kyle Larson opted not to pit and assumed the lead. Kyle Busch, commitment line violation, and Elliott, uncontrolled tire, restarted the race from the tail-end of the field for pit road infractions.

The race restarted with 20 to go. Logano passed Larson with 17 to go and drove on to score the victory.

== Post-race ==
=== Driver comments ===
Logano said in victory lane it was:

"nice to break through and get our first points win of the year, that being on the 300th start. For me personally, it was kind of a cool milestone to hit and drive into victory lane with that, too.”

Hamlin, who finished a season best third, said after the race that third "was about as good as we had. You know, we just didn't have the speed that the other cars had. We talked about that Friday during media. But we optimized our day. It's the best we could do. We finished right where we should have.”

Stenhouse, who rebounded from hitting the wall early in the race to finish fourth, said he "had to fight hard for this top-five. I made a mistake early. I thought we had a car capable of running in the top five a lot. I got loose into [Turn] 3 and got into the fence and had to play catchup from there."

== Race results ==
=== Stage results ===
Stage 1 Laps: 100

Pos	No	Driver	Team	Manufacturer	Points
1	20	Matt Kenseth	Joe Gibbs Racing	Toyota	10
2	42	Kyle Larson	Chip Ganassi Racing	Chevrolet	9
3	78	Martin Truex Jr.	Furniture Row Racing	Toyota	8
4	4	Kevin Harvick	Stewart–Haas Racing	Ford	7
5	11	Denny Hamlin	Joe Gibbs Racing	Toyota	6
6	2	Brad Keselowski	Team Penske	Ford	5
7	31	Ryan Newman	Richard Childress Racing	Chevrolet	4
8	1	Jamie McMurray	Chip Ganassi Racing	Chevrolet	3
9	14	Clint Bowyer	Stewart–Haas Racing	Ford	2
10	22	Joey Logano	Team Penske	Ford	1
Official stage one results

Stage 2 Laps: 100

Pos	No	Driver	Team	Manufacturer	Points
1	2	Brad Keselowski	Team Penske	Ford	10
2	20	Matt Kenseth	Joe Gibbs Racing	Toyota	9
3	4	Kevin Harvick	Stewart–Haas Racing	Ford	8
4	11	Denny Hamlin	Joe Gibbs Racing	Toyota	7
5	42	Kyle Larson	Chip Ganassi Racing	Chevrolet	6
6	31	Ryan Newman	Richard Childress Racing	Chevrolet	5
7	1	Jamie McMurray	Chip Ganassi Racing	Chevrolet	4
8	14	Clint Bowyer	Stewart–Haas Racing	Ford	3
9	13	Ty Dillon (R)	Germain Racing	Chevrolet	2
10	22	Joey Logano	Team Penske	Ford	1
Official stage two results

=== Final stage results ===
Stage 3 Laps: 200

Pos	No	Driver	Team	Manufacturer	Laps	Points
1	22	Joey Logano†	Team Penske	Ford	400	17
2	2	Brad Keselowski	Team Penske	Ford	400	50
3	11	Denny Hamlin	Joe Gibbs Racing	Toyota	400	47
4	17	Ricky Stenhouse Jr.	Roush Fenway Racing	Ford	400	33
5	4	Kevin Harvick	Stewart–Haas Racing	Ford	400	47
6	1	Jamie McMurray	Chip Ganassi Racing	Chevrolet	400	38
7	31	Ryan Newman	Richard Childress Racing	Chevrolet	400	39
8	41	Kurt Busch	Stewart–Haas Racing	Ford	400	29
9	43	Aric Almirola	Richard Petty Motorsports	Ford	400	28
10	78	Martin Truex Jr.	Furniture Row Racing	Toyota	400	35
11	48	Jimmie Johnson	Hendrick Motorsports	Chevrolet	400	26
12	19	Daniel Suárez (R)	Joe Gibbs Racing	Toyota	400	25
13	6	Trevor Bayne	Roush Fenway Racing	Ford	400	24
14	42	Kyle Larson	Chip Ganassi Racing	Chevrolet	400	38
15	14	Clint Bowyer	Stewart–Haas Racing	Ford	400	27
16	18	Kyle Busch	Joe Gibbs Racing	Toyota	400	21
17	37	Chris Buescher	JTG Daugherty Racing	Chevrolet	400	20
18	10	Danica Patrick	Stewart–Haas Racing	Ford	400	19
19	38	David Ragan	Front Row Motorsports	Ford	400	18
20	3	Austin Dillon	Richard Childress Racing	Chevrolet	400	17
21	34	Landon Cassill	Front Row Motorsports	Ford	400	16
22	5	Kasey Kahne	Hendrick Motorsports	Chevrolet	400	15
23	20	Matt Kenseth	Joe Gibbs Racing	Toyota	400	33
24	24	Chase Elliott	Hendrick Motorsports	Chevrolet	400	13
25	27	Paul Menard	Richard Childress Racing	Chevrolet	400	12
26	13	Ty Dillon (R)	Germain Racing	Chevrolet	400	13
27	72	Cole Whitt	TriStar Motorsports	Chevrolet	400	10
28	32	Matt DiBenedetto	Fas Lane Racing	Ford	400	9
29	95	Michael McDowell	Leavine Family Racing	Chevrolet	399	8
30	88	Dale Earnhardt Jr.	Hendrick Motorsports	Chevrolet	398	7
31	23	Gray Gaulding (R)	BK Racing	Toyota	398	6
32	83	Corey LaJoie (R)	BK Racing	Toyota	396	5
33	15	Reed Sorenson	Premium Motorsports	Chevrolet	395	4
34	51	Timmy Hill (i)	Rick Ware Racing	Chevrolet	393	0
35	33	Jeffrey Earnhardt	Circle Sport – The Motorsports Group	Chevrolet	392	2
36	21	Ryan Blaney	Wood Brothers Racing	Ford	378	1
37	47	A. J. Allmendinger	JTG Daugherty Racing	Chevrolet	332	1
38	77	Erik Jones (R)	Furniture Row Racing	Toyota	4	1
Official race results

† Joey Logano was penalized 25 points and the win is encumbered due to a rear suspension infraction post-race.

=== Race statistics ===
- Lead changes: 8 among different drivers
- Cautions/Laps: 9 for 53
- Red flags: 0
- Time of race: 3 hours, 12 minutes and 8 seconds
- Average speed: 93.685 miles per hour (150.771 km/h)

== Media ==
=== Television ===
Fox Sports covered their 17th race at the Richmond International Raceway. Mike Joy, two-time Richmond winner Jeff Gordon and six-time Richmond winner Darrell Waltrip had the call in the booth for the race. Chris Neville, Vince Welch and Matt Yocum handled the pit road duties for the television side.

Fox Television
Booth announcers	Pit reporters
Lap-by-lap: Mike Joy; Color-commentator: Jeff Gordon; Color commentator: Darrell Waltrip	Chris Neville; Vince Welch; Matt Yocum

=== Radio ===
MRN had the radio call for the race which will also be simulcast on Sirius XM NASCAR Radio. Joe Moore, Jeff Striegle and six-time Richmond winner Rusty Wallace called the race in the booth when the field raced down the frontstretch. Mike Bagley called the race from a platform inside the backstretch when the field raced down the backstretch. Winston Kelley, Alex Hayden and Glenn Jarrett worked pit road for the radio side.

MRN Radio
Booth announcers	Turn announcers	Pit reporters
Lead announcer: Joe Moore; Announcer: Jeff Striegle; Announcer: Rusty Wallace	Backstretch: Mike Bagley	Winston Kelley; Alex Hayden; Glenn Jarrett

== Standings after the race ==
Drivers' Championship standings

	Pos	Driver	Points
	1	Kyle Larson	398
1	2	Martin Truex Jr.	358 (–40)
1	3	Chase Elliott	346 (–52)
	4	Joey Logano	333 (–65)
	5	Brad Keselowski	327 (–71)
3	6	Kevin Harvick	286 (–112)
	7	Jamie McMurray	282 (–116)
2	8	Jimmie Johnson	270 (–128)
1	9	Clint Bowyer	266 (–132)
1	10	Kyle Busch	235 (–163)
4	11	Denny Hamlin	231 (–167)
2	12	Ryan Blaney	229 (–169)
1	13	Ryan Newman	225 (–173)
1	14	Trevor Bayne	216 (–182)
1	15	Ricky Stenhouse Jr.	201 (–197)
4	16	Erik Jones	193 (–205)
Official driver's standings

Manufacturers' Championship standings

	Pos	Manufacturer	Points
1	1	Ford	330
1	2	Chevrolet	329 (–1)
	3	Toyota	301 (–29)
Official manufacturers' standings

- Note: Only the first 16 positions are included for the driver standings.
- . – Driver has clinched a position in the Monster Energy NASCAR Cup Series playoffs.

Previous race: 2017 Food City 500	Monster Energy NASCAR Cup Series; 2017 season	Next race: 2017 GEICO 500
