= 2017 O'Reilly Auto Parts 500 =

Auto race at Fort Worth in 2017

Race details
- Race 7 of 36 in the 2017 Monster Energy NASCAR Cup Series
- Date: April 9, 2017
- Location: Texas Motor Speedway in Fort Worth, Texas
- Course: Permanent racing facility
- Course length: 1.5 miles (2.4 km)
- Distance: 334 laps, 501 mi (801.6 km)
- Average speed: 147.137 miles per hour (236.794 km/h)

Pole position
Driver	Kevin Harvick	Stewart–Haas Racing
- Time: 27.217

Most laps led
Driver	Ryan Blaney	Wood Brothers Racing
- Laps: 148

Winner
No. 48	Jimmie Johnson	Hendrick Motorsports

Television in the United States
- Network: Fox
- Announcers: Mike Joy, Jeff Gordon and Darrell Waltrip
- Nielsen ratings: 2.5/6 (Overnight); 2.7/6 (Final); 4.5 million viewers

Radio in the United States
- Radio: PRN
- Booth announcers: Doug Rice, Mark Garrow and Wendy Venturini
- Turn announcers: Rob Albright (1 & 2) and Pat Patterson (3 & 4)

The 2017 O'Reilly Auto Parts 500 was a Monster Energy NASCAR Cup Series race held on April 9, 2017, at Texas Motor Speedway in Fort Worth, Texas. Contested over 334 laps on the 1.5-mile (2.4 km) intermediate quad-oval, it was the seventh race of the 2017 Monster Energy NASCAR Cup Series season.

== Entry list ==
No.	Driver	Team	Manufacturer
1	Jamie McMurray	Chip Ganassi Racing	Chevrolet
2	Brad Keselowski	Team Penske	Ford
3	Austin Dillon	Richard Childress Racing	Chevrolet
4	Kevin Harvick	Stewart–Haas Racing	Ford
5	Kasey Kahne	Hendrick Motorsports	Chevrolet
6	Trevor Bayne	Roush Fenway Racing	Ford
7	J. J. Yeley (i)	Tommy Baldwin Racing	Chevrolet
10	Danica Patrick	Stewart–Haas Racing	Ford
11	Denny Hamlin	Joe Gibbs Racing	Toyota
13	Ty Dillon (R)	Germain Racing	Chevrolet
14	Clint Bowyer	Stewart–Haas Racing	Ford
15	Reed Sorenson	Premium Motorsports	Toyota
17	Ricky Stenhouse Jr.	Roush Fenway Racing	Ford
18	Kyle Busch	Joe Gibbs Racing	Toyota
19	Daniel Suárez (R)	Joe Gibbs Racing	Toyota
20	Matt Kenseth	Joe Gibbs Racing	Toyota
21	Ryan Blaney	Wood Brothers Racing	Ford
22	Joey Logano	Team Penske	Ford
23	Gray Gaulding (R)	BK Racing	Toyota
24	Chase Elliott	Hendrick Motorsports	Chevrolet
27	Paul Menard	Richard Childress Racing	Chevrolet
31	Ryan Newman	Richard Childress Racing	Chevrolet
32	Matt DiBenedetto	Go Fas Racing	Ford
33	Jeffrey Earnhardt	Circle Sport – The Motorsports Group	Chevrolet
34	Landon Cassill	Front Row Motorsports	Ford
37	Chris Buescher	JTG Daugherty Racing	Chevrolet
38	David Ragan	Front Row Motorsports	Ford
41	Kurt Busch	Stewart–Haas Racing	Ford
42	Kyle Larson	Chip Ganassi Racing	Chevrolet
43	Aric Almirola	Richard Petty Motorsports	Ford
47	A. J. Allmendinger	JTG Daugherty Racing	Chevrolet
48	Jimmie Johnson	Hendrick Motorsports	Chevrolet
51	Timmy Hill (i)	Rick Ware Racing	Chevrolet
55	Derrike Cope	Premium Motorsports	Toyota
72	Cole Whitt	Tri-Star Motorsports	Chevrolet
77	Erik Jones (R)	Furniture Row Racing	Toyota
78	Martin Truex Jr.	Furniture Row Racing	Toyota
83	Corey LaJoie (R)	BK Racing	Toyota
88	Dale Earnhardt Jr.	Hendrick Motorsports	Chevrolet
95	Michael McDowell	Leavine Family Racing	Chevrolet
Official entry list

== Practice ==
=== First practice ===
Ryan Blaney was the fastest in the first practice session with a time of 27.809 seconds and a speed of 194.182 mph (312.506 km/h). During the session, Chase Elliott and Erik Jones sustained terminal damage to their cars in wrecks that required them to switch to backup cars.

Pos	No.	Driver	Team	Manufacturer	Time	Speed
1	21	Ryan Blaney	Wood Brothers Racing	Ford	27.809	194.182
2	95	Michael McDowell	Leavine Family Racing	Chevrolet	27.827	194.056
3	37	Chris Buescher	JTG Daugherty Racing	Chevrolet	27.927	193.361
Official first practice results

=== Second practice ===
Brad Keselowski was the fastest in the second practice session with a time of 27.531 seconds and a speed of 196.143 mph (315.662 km/h).

Pos	No.	Driver	Team	Manufacturer	Time	Speed
1	2	Brad Keselowski	Team Penske	Ford	27.531	196.143
2	42	Kyle Larson	Chip Ganassi Racing	Chevrolet	27.538	196.093
3	13	Ty Dillon (R)	Germain Racing	Chevrolet	27.545	196.043
Official second practice results

=== Final practice ===
Jimmie Johnson was the fastest in the final practice session with a time of 27.719 and a speed of 194.812 mph (313.520 km/h).

Pos	No.	Driver	Team	Manufacturer	Time	Speed
1	48	Jimmie Johnson	Hendrick Motorsports	Chevrolet	27.719	194.812
2	24	Chase Elliott	Hendrick Motorsports	Chevrolet	27.799	194.252
3	42	Kyle Larson	Chip Ganassi Racing	Chevrolet	27.890	193.618
Official final practice results

== Qualifying ==
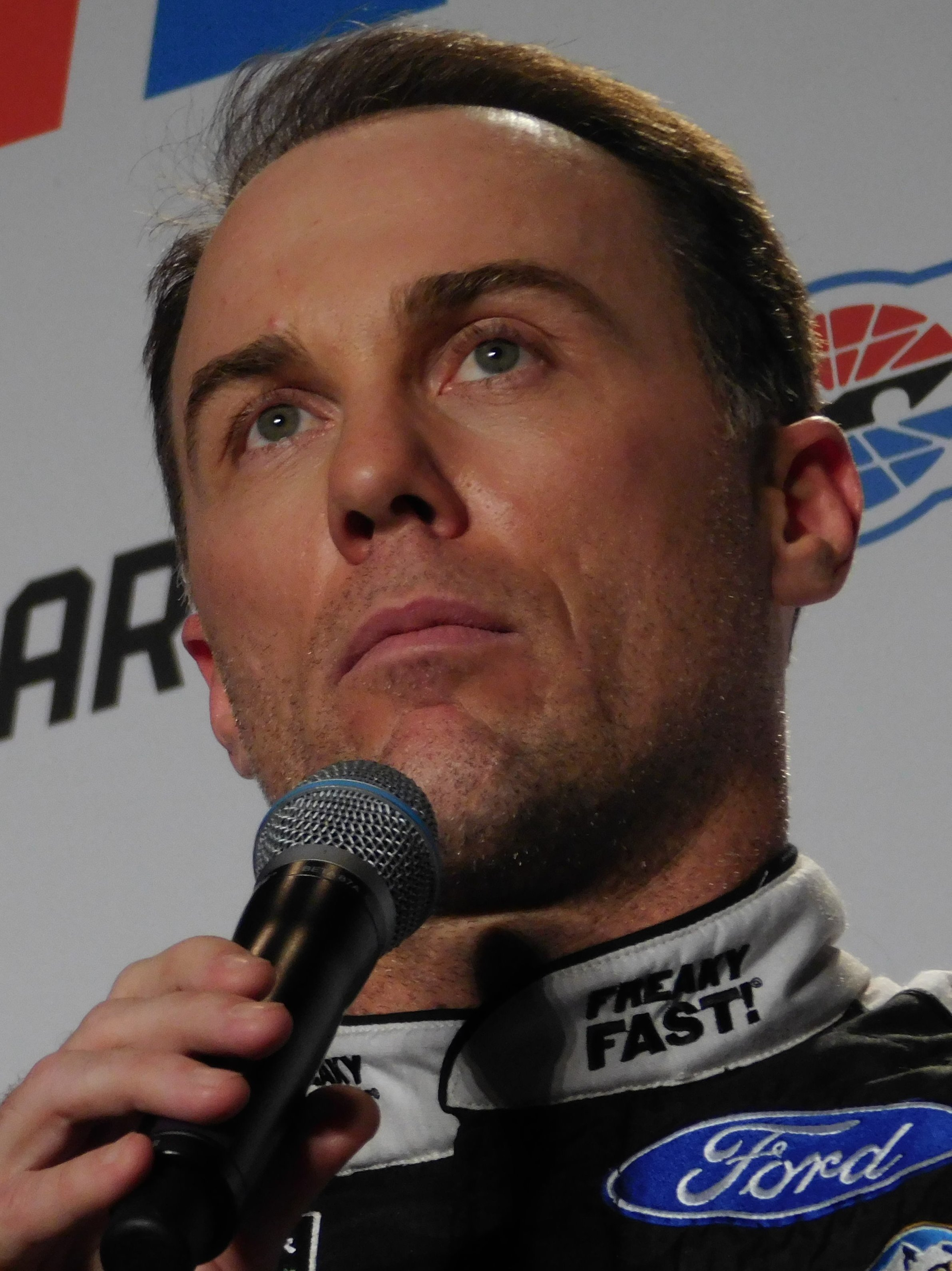
Kevin Harvick scored the pole position.

Kevin Harvick scored the pole for the race with a time of 27.217 and a speed of 198.405 mph (319.302 km/h).

=== Qualifying results ===
Pos	No.	Driver	Team	Manufacturer	R1	R2	R3
1	4	Kevin Harvick	Stewart–Haas Racing	Ford	27.565	27.307	27.217
2	21	Ryan Blaney	Wood Brothers Racing	Ford	27.775	27.459	27.270
3	14	Clint Bowyer	Stewart–Haas Racing	Ford	27.622	27.379	27.270
4	22	Joey Logano	Team Penske	Ford	28.161	27.459	27.306
5	2	Brad Keselowski	Team Penske	Ford	27.697	27.428	27.333
6	1	Jamie McMurray	Chip Ganassi Racing	Chevrolet	27.706	27.643	27.482
7	78	Martin Truex Jr.	Furniture Row Racing	Toyota	27.781	27.516	27.492
8	20	Matt Kenseth	Joe Gibbs Racing	Toyota	27.868	27.551	27.509
9	31	Ryan Newman	Richard Childress Racing	Chevrolet	28.144	27.622	27.618
10	41	Kurt Busch	Stewart–Haas Racing	Ford	28.176	27.580	27.692
11	17	Ricky Stenhouse Jr.	Roush Fenway Racing	Ford	28.090	27.639	27.761
12	6	Trevor Bayne	Roush Fenway Racing	Ford	27.631	27.677	28.113
13	95	Michael McDowell	Leavine Family Racing	Chevrolet	28.260	27.703	—
14	13	Ty Dillon (R)	Germain Racing	Chevrolet	27.991	27.714	—
15	34	Landon Cassill	Front Row Motorsports	Ford	28.243	27.734	—
16	47	A. J. Allmendinger	JTG Daugherty Racing	Chevrolet	28.071	27.781	—
17	11	Denny Hamlin	Joe Gibbs Racing	Toyota	28.130	27.823	—
18	43	Aric Almirola	Richard Petty Motorsports	Ford	28.291	27.855	—
19	10	Danica Patrick	Stewart–Haas Racing	Ford	28.079	27.876	—
20	19	Daniel Suárez (R)	Joe Gibbs Racing	Toyota	27.980	27.937	—
21	38	David Ragan	Front Row Motorsports	Ford	28.298	28.058	—
22	27	Paul Menard	Richard Childress Racing	Chevrolet	28.063	28.254	—
23	83	Corey LaJoie (R)	BK Racing	Toyota	28.318	28.614	—
24	48	Jimmie Johnson	Hendrick Motorsports	Chevrolet	27.943	0.000	—
25	3	Austin Dillon	Richard Childress Racing	Chevrolet	28.339	—	—
26	32	Matt DiBenedetto	Go Fas Racing	Ford	28.371	—	—
27	7	J. J. Yeley (i)	Tommy Baldwin Racing	Chevrolet	28.452	—	—
28	72	Cole Whitt	TriStar Motorsports	Chevrolet	28.542	—	—
29	23	Gray Gaulding (R)	BK Racing	Toyota	28.683	—	—
30	15	Reed Sorenson	Premium Motorsports	Toyota	28.695	—	—
31	33	Jeffrey Earnhardt	Circle Sport – The Motorsports Group	Chevrolet	29.532	—	—
32	42	Kyle Larson	Chip Ganassi Racing	Chevrolet	0.000	—	—
33	24	Chase Elliott	Hendrick Motorsports	Chevrolet	0.000	—	—
34	18	Kyle Busch	Joe Gibbs Racing	Toyota	0.000	—	—
35	5	Kasey Kahne	Hendrick Motorsports	Chevrolet	0.000	—	—
36	77	Erik Jones (R)	Furniture Row Racing	Toyota	0.000	—	—
37	88	Dale Earnhardt Jr.	Hendrick Motorsports	Chevrolet	0.000	—	—
38	37	Chris Buescher	JTG Daugherty Racing	Chevrolet	0.000	—	—
39	51	Timmy Hill (i)	Rick Ware Racing	Chevrolet	0.000	—	—
40	55	Derrike Cope	Premium Motorsports	Toyota	0.000	—	—
Official qualifying results

== Race ==
=== First stage ===
Kevin Harvick led the field to the green flag at 1:49 p.m., but the race was slowed when the first caution flew on the third lap for debris on the frontstretch.

The race restarted on the sixth lap. The second caution flew on lap 10 for a three-car wreck in Turn 2 involving Jeffrey Earnhardt, Gray Gaulding and Reed Sorenson. Austin Dillon, who took his car to the garage prior to the initial start for a broken track bar and upper control arm, returned to the race 12 laps down. He said after the race that when he "made a pace lap before the race I could feel something was broken. We had to go into the garage and make repairs before we could even start the race."

On the lap 16 restart, Ryan Blaney edged out Harvick exiting Turn 2 to take the lead. The third caution, a scheduled competition caution, flew on lap 31. Kyle Larson was penalized for driving through too many pit boxes and restarted the race from the tail end of the field. A crew member of Chris Buescher's team, jackman Zack Young, was injured when Buescher's car was clipped by the 77 of Erik Jones, spinning him into his pit box.

The race restarted on lap 37 and stayed green the remainder of the stage until Blaney won the first stage and the fourth caution flew on lap 85 for the stage conclusion. Martin Truex Jr. exited pit road with the race lead.

=== Second stage ===
On the lap 93 restart, Truex got loose going into Turn 1 and Blaney retook the lead. Debris in Turn 2, a piece of bare bond, brought out the fifth caution on lap 121.

The race restarted on lap 127. Debris in Turn 1, another piece of bare bond, brought out the sixth caution on lap 163. Coming seven laps prior to the end of the stage, all but the first seven cars opted to pit.

The race restarted on lap 167. Blaney won the second stage and the seventh caution flew for the end of the stage. The seven cars that stayed out under the previous caution, Blaney among them, pitted under this caution. Harvick, who pitted during the sixth caution, assumed the lead.

=== Final stage ===
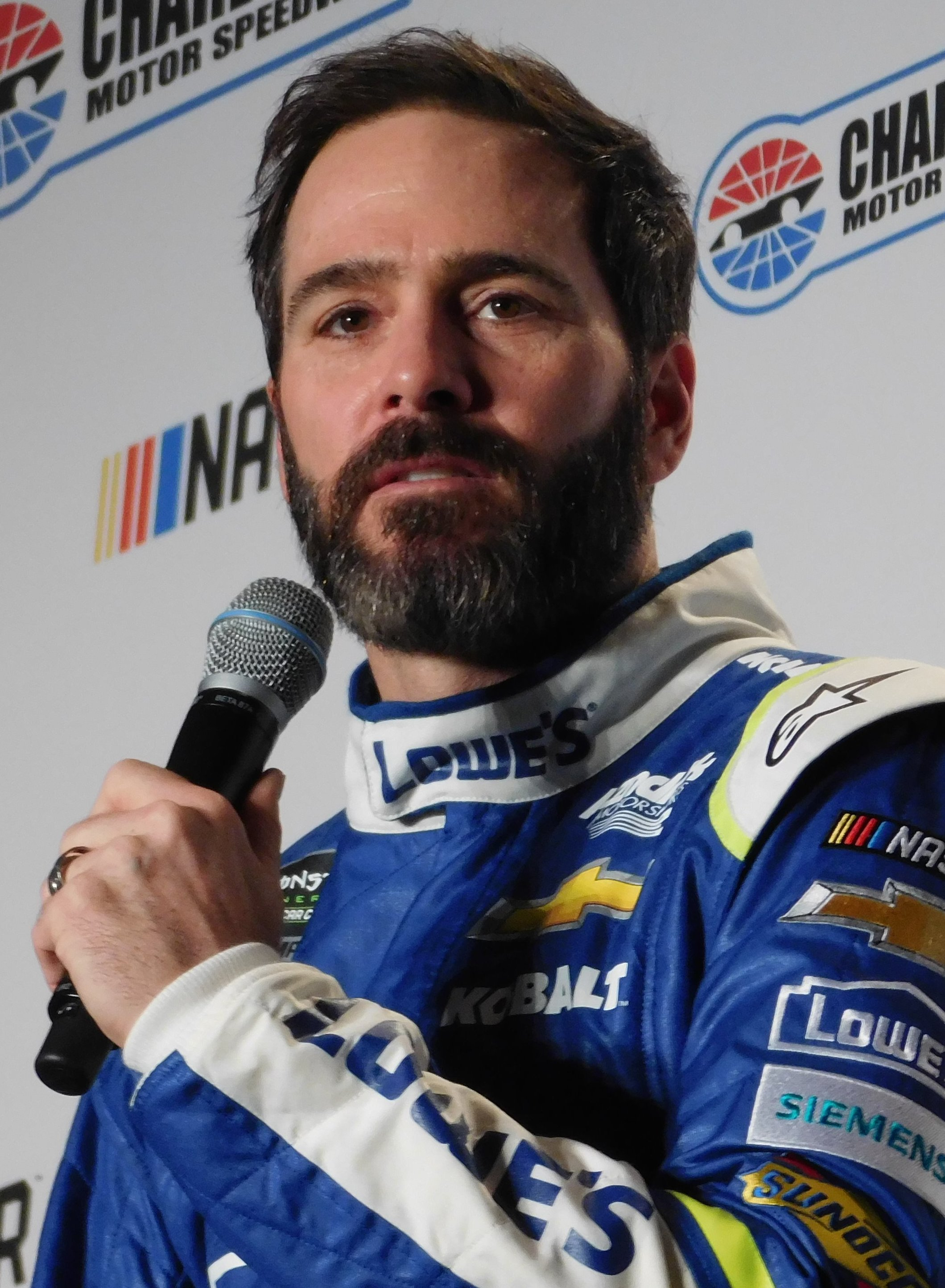
Jimmie Johnson won the race.

The race restarted on lap 178. A number of cars hit pit road around lap 219 to start a cycle of green flag pit stops. Harvick pitted from the lead the following lap, giving the lead to Brad Keselowski. He pitted on lap 224 and teammate Joey Logano took the lead. He pitted with 107 laps to go and Truex cycled to the lead.

Another round of green flag stops took place with 62 to go. Truex pitted from the lead with 61 to go. Jimmie Johnson pitted from the lead with 60 to go. Logano held the lead for 15 laps before pitting with 45 to go and Harvick cycled to the lead.

Debris in Turn 3 brought out the eighth caution with 35 to go. Everyone pitted except Logano who stayed out to assume the race lead. Blaney, who worked his way back into the top-10, slid through his pit stall and fell back through the running order. He said after the race he "got to eighth or something like that before the last caution, and I slid through our pit box, and that was an unfortunate deal. We were kind of pinned in between the 4 and the 88 and there was a weird angle. I just stopped a little deep, and I hurt us on that one for sure.”

The race restarted with 30 to go. Johnson edged out Logano to take the lead with 16 to go and held off Larson in the final laps to drive on to score the victory.

== Post-race ==
=== Driver comments ===
“I guess I remembered how to drive, and I guess this team remembered how to do it,” Johnson said in victory lane. “I'm just real proud of this team. What a tough track and tough conditions. We were really in our wheelhouse and we were just able to execute all day.”

After his victory lane interviews, Johnson went to the infield care center to receive three bags of IV fluid because the fluid system in his car malfunctioned in the closing laps.

Dale Earnhardt Jr., who earned his first top-five finish since a runner-up finish in the 2016 Axalta "We Paint Winners" 400 at Pocono Raceway, said he "figured we'd get one sooner or later, but it's nice. I know our fans are pulling for us. Could have finished a little better, but we'll take a top five."

Blaney – who led a race high of 148 laps, the first time a Wood Brothers Racing entry has led over 100 laps since 1982 – said, when asked about staying out vs. pitting in the caution prior to the end of the second stage, it's easy to "say, oh, we should have done this, should have done that. Now I say we should have stayed out the last caution and might have had a better shot at it. But you can't really change any of that now. Yeah, in hindsight that was kind of a judgment call. You give up a stage win and 10 point and a bonus point for the playoffs to try to set yourself for the end of the race. We thought we had enough time after segment 2 to try to work our way back up through there, and a restart actually after segment 2 really went bad for us. We got jumbled up in 1 and 2 and let a lot of cars get by. That was kind of the deciding factor I feel like. I let a lot of good cars get by like the 48 and 42 and 24, and that hurt us more, I think, than anything was that restart after segment 2 when we had to check up big in 1 and 2. I thought we made the right call to stay out there and try to win that segment. I'm for that.”

== Race results ==
=== Stage results ===
Stage 1 Laps: 85

Pos	No	Driver	Team	Manufacturer	Points
1	21	Ryan Blaney	Wood Brothers Racing	Ford	10
2	78	Martin Truex Jr.	Furniture Row Racing	Toyota	9
3	1	Jamie McMurray	Chip Ganassi Racing	Chevrolet	8
4	4	Kevin Harvick	Stewart–Haas Racing	Ford	7
5	2	Brad Keselowski	Team Penske	Ford	6
6	42	Kyle Larson	Chip Ganassi Racing	Chevrolet	5
7	14	Clint Bowyer	Stewart–Haas Racing	Ford	4
8	17	Ricky Stenhouse Jr.	Roush Fenway Racing	Ford	3
9	22	Joey Logano	Team Penske	Ford	2
10	18	Kyle Busch	Joe Gibbs Racing	Toyota	1
Official stage one results

Stage 2 Laps: 85

Pos	No	Driver	Team	Manufacturer	Points
1	21	Ryan Blaney	Wood Brothers Racing	Ford	10
2	48	Jimmie Johnson	Hendrick Motorsports	Chevrolet	9
3	1	Jamie McMurray	Chip Ganassi Racing	Chevrolet	8
4	42	Kyle Larson	Chip Ganassi Racing	Chevrolet	7
5	24	Chase Elliott	Hendrick Motorsports	Chevrolet	6
6	41	Kurt Busch	Stewart–Haas Racing	Ford	5
7	4	Kevin Harvick	Stewart–Haas Racing	Ford	4
8	2	Brad Keselowski	Team Penske	Ford	3
9	88	Dale Earnhardt Jr.	Hendrick Motorsports	Chevrolet	2
10	78	Martin Truex Jr.	Furniture Row Racing	Toyota	1
Official stage two results

=== Final stage results ===
Stage 3 Laps: 164

Pos	No	Driver	Team	Manufacturer	Laps	Points
1	48	Jimmie Johnson	Hendrick Motorsports	Chevrolet	334	49
2	42	Kyle Larson	Chip Ganassi Racing	Chevrolet	334	47
3	22	Joey Logano	Team Penske	Ford	334	36
4	4	Kevin Harvick	Stewart–Haas Racing	Ford	334	44
5	88	Dale Earnhardt Jr.	Hendrick Motorsports	Chevrolet	334	34
6	2	Brad Keselowski	Team Penske	Ford	334	40
7	1	Jamie McMurray	Chip Ganassi Racing	Chevrolet	334	46
8	78	Martin Truex Jr.	Furniture Row Racing	Toyota	334	39
9	24	Chase Elliott	Hendrick Motorsports	Chevrolet	334	34
10	41	Kurt Busch	Stewart–Haas Racing	Ford	334	32
11	14	Clint Bowyer	Stewart–Haas Racing	Ford	334	30
12	21	Ryan Blaney	Wood Brothers Racing	Ford	334	45
13	6	Trevor Bayne	Roush Fenway Racing	Ford	334	24
14	17	Ricky Stenhouse Jr.	Roush Fenway Racing	Ford	334	26
15	18	Kyle Busch	Joe Gibbs Racing	Toyota	334	23
16	20	Matt Kenseth	Joe Gibbs Racing	Toyota	334	21
17	13	Ty Dillon (R)	Germain Racing	Chevrolet	334	20
18	43	Aric Almirola	Richard Petty Motorsports	Ford	334	19
19	19	Daniel Suárez (R)	Joe Gibbs Racing	Toyota	334	18
20	47	A. J. Allmendinger	JTG Daugherty Racing	Chevrolet	334	17
21	37	Chris Buescher	JTG Daugherty Racing	Chevrolet	333	16
22	77	Erik Jones (R)	Furniture Row Racing	Toyota	333	15
23	95	Michael McDowell	Leavine Family Racing	Chevrolet	333	14
24	10	Danica Patrick	Stewart–Haas Racing	Ford	333	13
25	11	Denny Hamlin	Joe Gibbs Racing	Toyota	333	12
26	31	Ryan Newman	Richard Childress Racing	Chevrolet	332	11
27	7	J. J. Yeley (i)	Tommy Baldwin Racing	Chevrolet	330	0
28	38	David Ragan	Front Row Motorsports	Ford	329	9
29	34	Landon Cassill	Front Row Motorsports	Ford	329	8
30	72	Cole Whitt	TriStar Motorsports	Chevrolet	327	7
31	32	Matt DiBenedetto	Fas Lane Racing	Ford	327	6
32	83	Corey LaJoie (R)	BK Racing	Toyota	326	5
33	3	Austin Dillon	Richard Childress Racing	Chevrolet	322	4
34	23	Gray Gaulding (R)	BK Racing	Toyota	322	3
35	15	Reed Sorenson	Premium Motorsports	Chevrolet	319	2
36	27	Paul Menard	Richard Childress Racing	Chevrolet	314	1
37	55	Derrike Cope	Premium Motorsports	Toyota	313	1
38	5	Kasey Kahne	Hendrick Motorsports	Chevrolet	303	1
39	51	Timmy Hill (i)	Rick Ware Racing	Chevrolet	104	0
40	33	Jeffrey Earnhardt	Circle Sport – The Motorsports Group	Chevrolet	9	1
Official race results

=== Race statistics ===
- Lead changes: 6 among different drivers
- Cautions/Laps: 8 for 35
- Red flags: 0
- Time of race: 3 hours, 24 minutes and 18 seconds
- Average speed: 147.137 miles per hour (236.794 km/h)

== Media ==
=== Television ===
Fox Sports covered their 17th race at the Texas Motor Speedway. Mike Joy, 2009 race winner Jeff Gordon and Darrell Waltrip had the call in the booth for the race. Jamie Little, Vince Welch and Matt Yocum handled the pit road duties for the television side.

Fox Television
Booth announcers	Pit reporters
Lap-by-lap: Mike Joy; Color-commentator: Jeff Gordon; Color commentator: Darrell Waltrip	Jamie Little; Vince Welch; Matt Yocum

=== Radio ===
The race was broadcast on radio by the Performance Racing Network and simulcast on Sirius XM NASCAR Radio.

PRN
Booth announcers	Turn announcers	Pit reporters
Lead announcer: Doug Rice; Announcer: Mark Garrow; Announcer: Wendy Venturini	Turns 1 & 2: Rob Albright; Turns 3 & 4: Pat Patterson	Brad Gillie; Brett McMillan; Jim Noble; Steve Richards

== Standings after the race ==
Drivers' Championship standings

	Pos	Driver	Points
	1	Kyle Larson	315
	2	Chase Elliott	298 (–17)
	3	Martin Truex Jr.	275 (–40)
	4	Brad Keselowski	274 (–41)
	5	Joey Logano	243 (–72)
1	6	Ryan Blaney	224 (–91)
1	7	Kyle Busch	211 (–104)
1	8	Jamie McMurray	209 (–106)
1	9	Clint Bowyer	204 (–111)
	10	Kevin Harvick	198 (–117)
3	11	Jimmie Johnson	190 (–125)
3	12	Trevor Bayne	164 (–151)
2	13	Ryan Newman	163 (–152)
1	14	Erik Jones	159 (–156)
4	15	Kurt Busch	151 (–164)
	16	Denny Hamlin	151 (–164)
Official driver's standings

Manufacturers' Championship standings

	Pos	Manufacturer	Points
1	1	Chevrolet	258
1	2	Ford	255 (–3)
	3	Toyota	234 (–24)
Official manufacturers' standings

- Note: Only the first 16 positions are included for the driver standings.
- . – Driver has clinched a position in the Monster Energy NASCAR Cup Series playoffs.

Previous race: 2017 STP 500	Monster Energy NASCAR Cup Series; 2017 season	Next race: 2017 Food City 500
