= Barney Visser =

NASCAR team owner

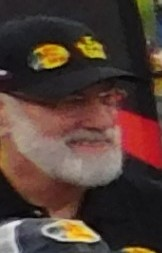
- Visser in 2017
- Born: 1949 (age 76–77); Denver, Colorado
- Occupation: Furniture Row co-owner Furniture Row Racing owner 2005-2018

Barney Visser (born 1949) is an entrepreneur and author. He is the co-owner of Furniture Row and Visser Precision. Visser also ran Furniture Row Racing in the NASCAR Cup Series from 2005 to 2018, winning the championship in 2017. Furniture Row Racing, was based in Denver, Colorado and was one of a few NASCAR Cup Series teams not based in North Carolina.

== Personal life ==
After attending Denver Christian High School for three years, Visser graduated from Thomas Jefferson High School in Denver. He volunteered in the Vietnam War for 21 months after high school, and he served as a paratrooper for 11 months in the 173rd Airborne Brigade between July 1968 and June 1969. Visser and his wife Carolyn have seven children. Visser enrolled at the University of Northern Colorado in the fall of 1969 or 1970, playing one season Division II football. He dropped out during the spring semester after losing his GI scholarship.

== Furniture ==
Visser began his business manufacturing big poof pillows in the 1970s. He owned eight stores called Pillow Kingdom in 1977, when he decided to start his first waterbed store called Big Sur Waterbeds. That company was so successful that he changed the whole company into waterbed stores. He estimates that the company held 85 stores in the mid-1980s. The Furniture Row company operates 330 stores in 31 states under the Denver Mattress and Furniture Row names.

== Racing ==
Visser decided to retire from his businesses, and began racing at Colorado National Speedway as a hobby. He met local modified driver Jerry Robertson, and the two decided to form a NASCAR Busch Series (now O'Reilly Auto Parts Series) team in 2004.

Visser's NASCAR team began running in 2005, currently running in the top-tier NASCAR Cup Series after 19 races with Robertson driving his Busch Series car. Joe Nemechek earned the team's first pole position at the spring Talladega Superspeedway race in 2008. Regan Smith scored the team's first win at the 2011 Showtime Southern 500 at Darlington Raceway. Kurt Busch earned the team's first berth in the Chase for the Sprint Cup in 2013. Martin Truex Jr. won the team's first NASCAR Cup series title in 2017. On September 4, 2018, Barney Visser announced that with the loss of major sponsor 5-hour Energy and the increasing cost to maintain a technical alliance with Joe Gibbs Racing (300% Increase), he had no choice but to announce that the team would cease operation at the end of the 2018 season, one year after winning their first championship title. This is also because Visser has been dealing with health problems.

=== After Racing ===
After shutting down the team, Visser had to sell his NASCAR charter, as per NASCAR rules. Visser went to motorsports/entertainment agency, Spire Sports + Entertainment seeking to sell his charter, and suggested to Spire president Ty Norris to buy the charter (the most expensive one in NASCAR history) and start a new Cup Series team. The agency accepted, purchasing the #78 charter. The team would be partnered with Premium Motorsports and would later win a shocking victory in their first season at Daytona with Justin Haley.

In 2020, the No. 78 was brought back into NASCAR by the rise of B. J. McLeod Motorsports. Later, McLeod and Matt Tifft started their own Cup Series team.

== Media ==
He is the co-author of the book Vietnam: Fresh, Positive Insights for all who Suffered Loss in the Vietnam War (ISBN 978-0966404999) in November 2000.

Visser was the executive producer for the movie Uncle Nino.
