= 2017 Folds of Honor QuikTrip 500 =

Race details
- Race 2 of 36 in the 2017 Monster Energy NASCAR Cup Series
- Date: March 4, 2017
- Location: Atlanta Motor Speedway in Hampton, Georgia
- Course: Permanent racing facility
- Course length: 1.54 miles (2.48 km)
- Distance: 325 laps, 500.5 mi (806 km)
- Average speed: 140.898 mph (226.753 km/h)

Pole position
Driver	Kevin Harvick	Stewart–Haas Racing
- Time: 29.118

Most laps led
Driver	Kevin Harvick	Stewart–Haas Racing
- Laps: 293

Winner
No. 2	Brad Keselowski	Team Penske

Television in the United States
- Network: Fox
- Announcers: Mike Joy, Jeff Gordon and Darrell Waltrip
- Nielsen ratings: 3.6/7 (Overnight); 3.8/7 (Final); 6.6 million viewers

Radio in the United States
- Radio: PRN
- Booth announcers: Doug Rice, Mark Garrow and Wendy Venturini
- Turn announcers: Rob Albright (1 & 2) and Pat Patterson (3 & 4)

The 2017 Folds of Honor QuikTrip 500 was a Monster Energy NASCAR Cup Series race held on March 5, 2017, at Atlanta Motor Speedway in Hampton, Georgia. Contested over 325 laps on the 1.54-mile-long (2.48 km) asphalt quad-oval intermediate speedway, it was the second race of the 2017 Monster Energy NASCAR Cup Series season, and the 2,500th race in the history of the Cup Series. The race was won by the #2 Ford Fusion driven by Brad Keselowski for Team Penske.

== Entry list ==
No.	Driver	Team	Manufacturer
1	Jamie McMurray	Chip Ganassi Racing	Chevrolet
2	Brad Keselowski	Team Penske	Ford
3	Austin Dillon	Richard Childress Racing	Chevrolet
4	Kevin Harvick	Stewart–Haas Racing	Ford
5	Kasey Kahne	Hendrick Motorsports	Chevrolet
6	Trevor Bayne	Roush Fenway Racing	Ford
10	Danica Patrick	Stewart–Haas Racing	Ford
11	Denny Hamlin	Joe Gibbs Racing	Toyota
13	Ty Dillon (R)	Germain Racing	Chevrolet
14	Clint Bowyer	Stewart–Haas Racing	Ford
15	Reed Sorenson	Premium Motorsports	Chevrolet
17	Ricky Stenhouse Jr.	Roush Fenway Racing	Ford
18	Kyle Busch	Joe Gibbs Racing	Toyota
19	Daniel Suárez (R)	Joe Gibbs Racing	Toyota
20	Matt Kenseth	Joe Gibbs Racing	Toyota
21	Ryan Blaney	Wood Brothers Racing	Ford
22	Joey Logano	Team Penske	Ford
23	Gray Gaulding (R)	BK Racing	Toyota
24	Chase Elliott	Hendrick Motorsports	Chevrolet
27	Paul Menard	Richard Childress Racing	Chevrolet
31	Ryan Newman	Richard Childress Racing	Chevrolet
32	Matt DiBenedetto	Go Fas Racing	Ford
33	Jeffrey Earnhardt	Circle Sport – The Motorsports Group	Chevrolet
34	Landon Cassill	Front Row Motorsports	Ford
37	Chris Buescher	JTG Daugherty Racing	Chevrolet
38	David Ragan	Front Row Motorsports	Ford
41	Kurt Busch	Stewart–Haas Racing	Ford
42	Kyle Larson	Chip Ganassi Racing	Chevrolet
43	Aric Almirola	Richard Petty Motorsports	Ford
47	A. J. Allmendinger	JTG Daugherty Racing	Chevrolet
48	Jimmie Johnson	Hendrick Motorsports	Chevrolet
51	Cody Ware	Rick Ware Racing	Chevrolet
55	Derrike Cope	Premium Motorsports	Chevrolet
72	Cole Whitt	Tri-Star Motorsports	Chevrolet
77	Erik Jones (R)	Furniture Row Racing	Toyota
78	Martin Truex Jr.	Furniture Row Racing	Toyota
83	Corey LaJoie (R)	BK Racing	Toyota
88	Dale Earnhardt Jr.	Hendrick Motorsports	Chevrolet
95	Michael McDowell	Leavine Family Racing	Chevrolet
Official entry list

== Practice ==
=== First practice ===
Ryan Newman was the fastest in the first practice session with a time of 29.509 seconds and a speed of 187.875 mph (302.356 km/h).

Pos	No.	Driver	Team	Manufacturer	Time	Speed
1	31	Ryan Newman	Richard Childress Racing	Chevrolet	29.509	187.875
2	1	Jamie McMurray	Chip Ganassi Racing	Chevrolet	29.531	187.735
3	18	Kyle Busch	Joe Gibbs Racing	Toyota	29.553	187.595
Official first practice results

=== Final practice ===
Chase Elliott was the fastest in the final practice session with a time of 29.487 seconds and a speed of 188.015 mph (302.581 km/h).

Pos	No.	Driver	Team	Manufacturer	Time	Speed
1	24	Chase Elliott	Hendrick Motorsports	Chevrolet	29.487	188.015
2	2	Brad Keselowski	Team Penske	Ford	29.552	187.602
3	41	Kurt Busch	Stewart–Haas Racing	Ford	29.556	187.576
Official final practice results

== Qualifying ==
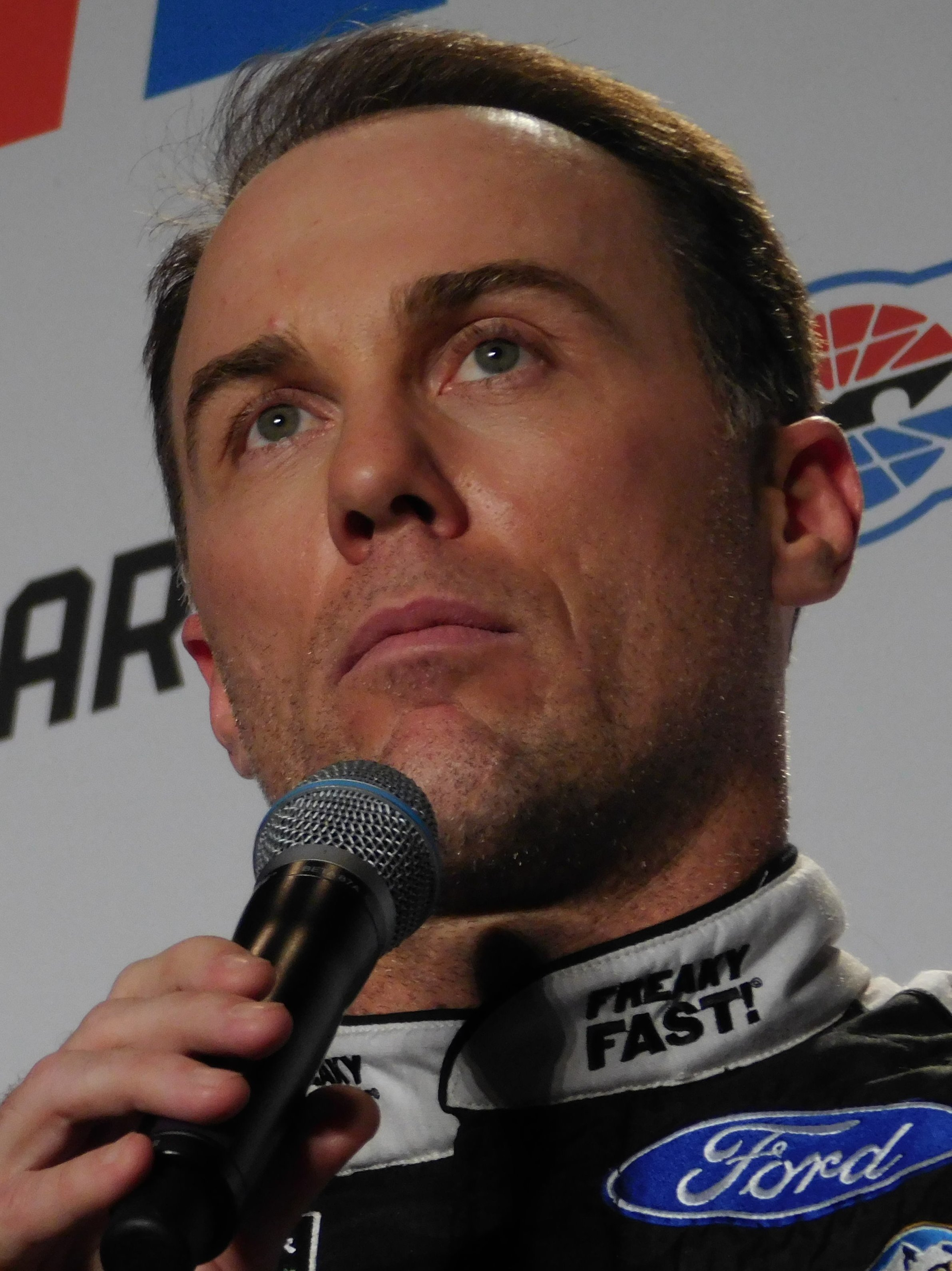
Kevin Harvick scored the pole position.

Kevin Harvick scored the pole for the race with a time of 29.118 and a speed of 190.398 mph (306.416 km/h). He said in his last qualifying run, he "was able to carry more speed and do some things with the car that I wasn't able to do in the first two runs. At that point I just didn't want to screw it up, because I felt like I'd gotten to the green, which I didn't do in the second round. I got to the green good, I got through (Turns) 1 and 2 good. I just needed to hit the bottom and get that left front on the line so that it would hook and get up off the corner. That was by far the best of the three laps, and we saved it perfectly for the end."

Derrike Cope, Jeffrey Earnhardt, Michael McDowell, Cody Ware and Cole Whitt failed to post a timed lap because their cars didn't pass pre-qualifying inspection in time. This was a result of new procedures that require cars that fail any station of inspection to return to the garage to make adjustments.

=== Qualifying results ===
Pos	No.	Driver	Team	Manufacturer	R1	R2	R3
1	4	Kevin Harvick	Stewart–Haas Racing	Ford	29.272	29.253	29.118
2	31	Ryan Newman	Richard Childress Racing	Chevrolet	29.202	29.214	29.199
3	18	Kyle Busch	Joe Gibbs Racing	Toyota	29.136	29.226	29.202
4	17	Ricky Stenhouse Jr.	Roush Fenway Racing	Ford	29.425	29.573	29.356
5	2	Brad Keselowski	Team Penske	Ford	29.548	29.345	29.367
6	22	Joey Logano	Team Penske	Ford	29.551	29.523	29.374
7	1	Jamie McMurray	Chip Ganassi Racing	Chevrolet	29.245	29.543	29.397
8	42	Kyle Larson	Chip Ganassi Racing	Chevrolet	29.458	29.372	29.533
9	78	Martin Truex Jr.	Furniture Row Racing	Toyota	29.511	29.411	29.534
10	11	Denny Hamlin	Joe Gibbs Racing	Toyota	29.252	29.390	29.544
11	24	Chase Elliott	Hendrick Motorsports	Chevrolet	29.403	29.450	29.554
12	88	Dale Earnhardt Jr.	Hendrick Motorsports	Chevrolet	29.621	29.623	29.633
13	41	Kurt Busch	Stewart–Haas Racing	Ford	29.305	29.649	—
14	21	Ryan Blaney	Wood Brothers Racing	Ford	29.509	29.707	—
15	6	Trevor Bayne	Roush Fenway Racing	Ford	29.341	29.710	—
16	20	Matt Kenseth	Joe Gibbs Racing	Toyota	29.558	29.738	—
17	27	Paul Menard	Richard Childress Racing	Chevrolet	29.545	29.743	—
18	48	Jimmie Johnson	Hendrick Motorsports	Chevrolet	29.571	29.757	—
19	3	Austin Dillon	Richard Childress Racing	Chevrolet	29.544	29.780	—
20	47	A. J. Allmendinger	JTG Daugherty Racing	Chevrolet	29.439	29.954	—
21	19	Daniel Suárez (R)	Joe Gibbs Racing	Toyota	29.468	29.963	—
22	32	Matt DiBenedetto	Go Fas Racing	Ford	29.499	29.964	—
23	77	Erik Jones (R)	Furniture Row Racing	Toyota	29.722	30.113	—
24	10	Danica Patrick	Stewart–Haas Racing	Ford	29.687	30.344	—
25	14	Clint Bowyer	Stewart–Haas Racing	Ford	29.723	—	—
26	13	Ty Dillon (R)	Germain Racing	Chevrolet	29.787	—	—
27	34	Landon Cassill	Front Row Motorsports	Ford	29.919	—	—
28	37	Chris Buescher	JTG Daugherty Racing	Chevrolet	29.928	—	—
29	5	Kasey Kahne	Hendrick Motorsports	Chevrolet	29.953	—	—
30	43	Aric Almirola	Richard Petty Motorsports	Ford	30.034	—	—
31	23	Gray Gaulding (R)	BK Racing	Toyota	30.401	—	—
32	83	Corey LaJoie (R)	BK Racing	Toyota	30.598	—	—
33	15	Reed Sorenson	Premium Motorsports	Chevrolet	30.697	—	—
34	38	David Ragan	Front Row Motorsports	Ford	422.357	—	—
35	33	Jeffrey Earnhardt	Circle Sport – The Motorsports Group	Chevrolet	0.000	—	—
36	95	Michael McDowell	Leavine Family Racing	Chevrolet	0.000	—	—
37	72	Cole Whitt	TriStar Motorsports	Chevrolet	0.000	—	—
38	55	Derrike Cope	Premium Motorsports	Chevrolet	0.000	—	—
39	51	Cody Ware	Rick Ware Racing	Chevrolet	0.000	—	—
Official qualifying results

== Race ==
=== Stage 1 ===
Kevin Harvick led the field to the green flag at 2:48 p.m. Joey Logano and Jamie McMurray made contact exiting Turn 2, but both saved themselves from spinning and continued racing. A number of cars started pitting on lap 32. Harvick pitted on lap 38 and Ryan Newman took the lead. He pitted on lap 40 and the lead cycled back to Harvick. Dale Earnhardt Jr. and Matt Kenseth were given pass through penalty's for speeding on pit road.

Ryan Blaney made an unscheduled stop for a loose right-front wheel on lap 48. Earnhardt made an unscheduled stop on lap 71 for a shredded right-rear tire. Harvick won the first stage and the first caution of the race flew for the completion of the stage.

=== Stage 2 ===
The race restarted on lap 94. Brad Keselowski made an unscheduled stop for a tire issue on lap 117. Two laps later, teammate Logano pitted. He was cited for speeding and served a pass through penalty. Keselowski un-lapped himself on lap 125 by passing Harvick on the high side in Turn 4. The next lap, another wave of green flag stops commenced. When Harvick pitted on lap 130, the lead cycled to Keselowski. Jimmie Johnson was given a pass through penalty for speeding on pit road.

Harvick powered by Keselowski on the backstretch to retake the lead on lap 143. Denny Hamlin made an unscheduled stop on lap 161 for a vibration. After pitting, he failed to get up to speed and reported that “something is broken.” He took his car to the garage and retired from the race with a track bar issue. Harvick won the second stage and the second caution flew on lap 171 for the end of the stage.

=== Final stage ===
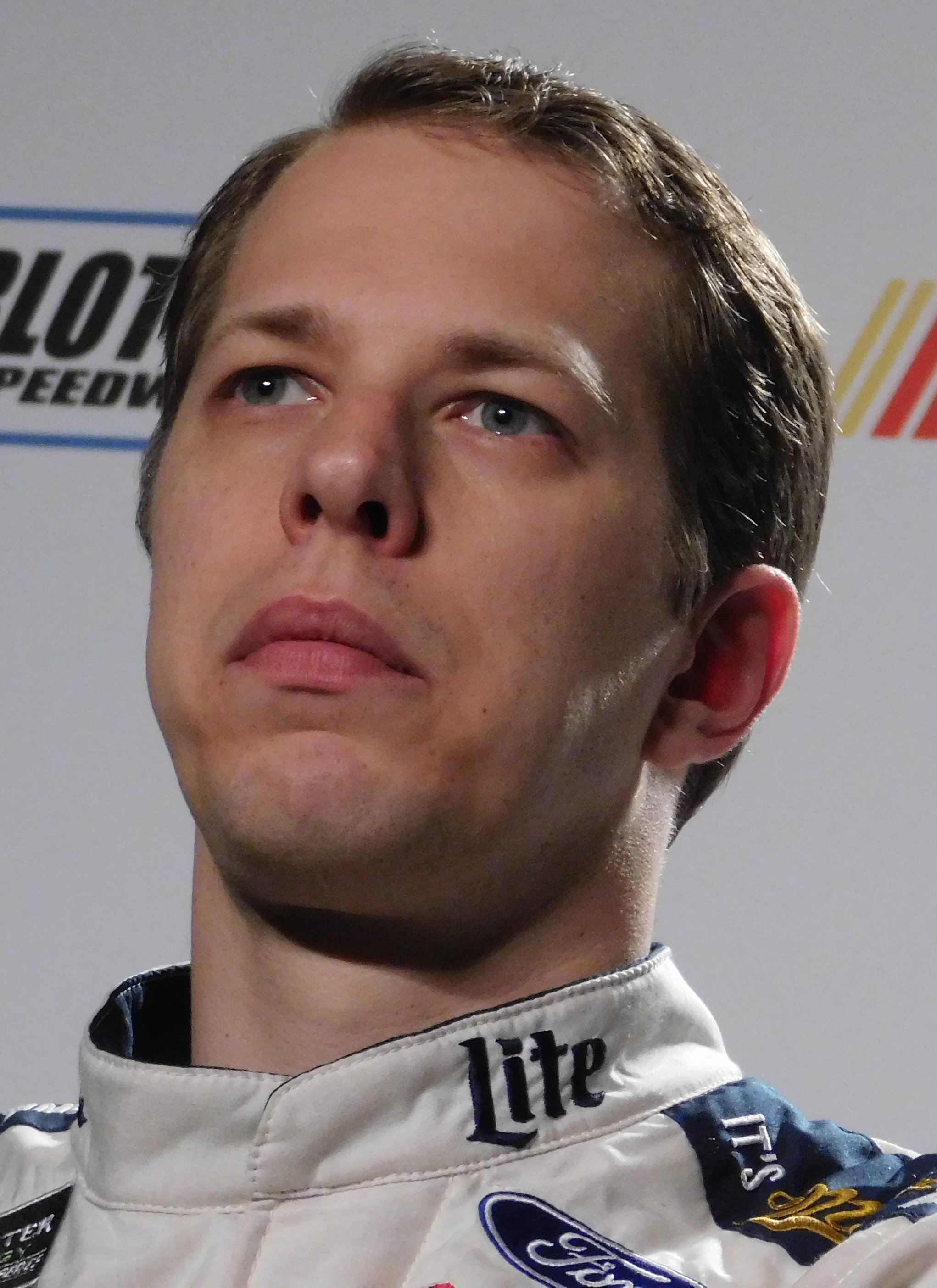
Brad Keselowski won the race.

The race restarted on lap 178. The next round of green flag pit stops started with 118 laps to go. Chase Elliott and Martin Truex Jr. were given pass through penalties for speeding.

Debris in Turn 4 brought out the third caution with 86 to go.

The race restarted with 80 to go. Gray Gaulding lost an engine in Turn 4, bringing out the fourth caution with 63 to go. Keselowski exited pit road first, but came back down pit road for a loose wheel, related to unsecure lug nuts, and Harvick assumed the lead once more.

The race restarted with 56 to go. Austin Dillon, restarting on the outside line, spun his tires and backed up the cars lined up on the outside. Clint Bowyer tagged the wall in Turn 1 and made contact with Erik Jones. With 47 to go, Bowyer suffered a left-front tire blowout and slammed the wall in Turn 1, bringing out the fifth caution. Newman, who was running fourth, was sent to the tail end of the field on the restart for a crew member being over the wall too soon when he pitted.

The race restarted with 42 to go. Two laps later, Newman came back down pit road, and subsequently went to the garage, for a battery issue. He returned to the race with 19 to go, but the same issue befell teammate Dillon with 17 to go. He was told not to pit and his car stalled on the apron in Turn 2, bringing out the sixth caution with 16 to go. Harvick exited pit road as the race leader, but was cited for speeding and sent to the tail end of the field on the restart. He said after the race that he "just made a mistake that I preach all the time that you don’t need to make – (don’t) beat yourself. Then you go out and make it yourself instead of following all the things you preach. That part is hard for me to swallow.” Kyle Larson inherited the lead.

The race restarted with 11 to go. Keselowski took second from Elliott on the restart and set his sights on Larson. With seven to go, they were side-by-side for the lead, with Keselowski emerging with the lead and scoring the victory.

== Post-race ==
=== Driver comments ===
Keselowski said in victory lane that this victory "kind of fell in our lap at the end, and my team put it all together when it counted. They gave me a great Autotrader Ford Fusion, and we were able to get by Kyle there at the end. I knew that he wasn't going to be easy to pass. His car was great, and I was able to make the right moves to get by him."

After finishing fourth despite a poor handling car early on, Kasey Kahne said he thought in the first 50 laps '"[Oh] my god, this feels just like last year.' But then suddenly we figured out how to fix [the handling problems] and that was awesome."

=== Infractions ===
Post-race inspection revealed that A. J. Allmendinger's car had three insecure lug nuts. On the Wednesday after the race, he was docked 35 points, fined $65,000 and his crew chief Randall Burnett was suspended three races.

== Race results ==
=== Stage results ===
Stage 1 Laps: 85

Pos	No	Driver	Team	Manufacturer	Points
1	4	Kevin Harvick	Stewart–Haas Racing	Ford	10
2	2	Brad Keselowski	Team Penske	Ford	9
3	24	Chase Elliott	Hendrick Motorsports	Chevrolet	8
4	78	Martin Truex Jr.	Furniture Row Racing	Toyota	7
5	22	Joey Logano	Team Penske	Ford	6
6	31	Ryan Newman	Richard Childress Racing	Chevrolet	5
7	17	Ricky Stenhouse Jr.	Roush Fenway Racing	Ford	4
8	11	Denny Hamlin	Joe Gibbs Racing	Toyota	3
9	42	Kyle Larson	Chip Ganassi Racing	Chevrolet	2
10	48	Jimmie Johnson	Hendrick Motorsports	Chevrolet	1
Official stage one results

Stage 2 Laps: 85

Pos	No	Driver	Team	Manufacturer	Points
1	4	Kevin Harvick	Stewart–Haas Racing	Ford	10
2	24	Chase Elliott	Hendrick Motorsports	Chevrolet	9
3	31	Ryan Newman	Richard Childress Racing	Chevrolet	8
4	78	Martin Truex Jr.	Furniture Row Racing	Toyota	7
5	42	Kyle Larson	Chip Ganassi Racing	Chevrolet	6
6	3	Austin Dillon	Richard Childress Racing	Chevrolet	5
7	2	Brad Keselowski	Team Penske	Ford	4
8	77	Erik Jones (R)	Furniture Row Racing	Toyota	3
9	14	Clint Bowyer	Stewart–Haas Racing	Ford	2
10	6	Trevor Bayne	Roush Fenway Racing	Ford	1
Official stage two results

=== Final stage results ===
Stage 3 Laps: 155

Pos	No	Driver	Team	Manufacturer	Laps	Points
1	2	Brad Keselowski	Team Penske	Ford	325	53
2	42	Kyle Larson	Chip Ganassi Racing	Chevrolet	325	43
3	20	Matt Kenseth	Joe Gibbs Racing	Toyota	325	34
4	5	Kasey Kahne	Hendrick Motorsports	Chevrolet	325	33
5	24	Chase Elliott	Hendrick Motorsports	Chevrolet	325	49
6	22	Joey Logano	Team Penske	Ford	325	37
7	41	Kurt Busch	Stewart–Haas Racing	Ford	325	30
8	78	Martin Truex Jr.	Furniture Row Racing	Toyota	325	43
9	4	Kevin Harvick	Stewart–Haas Racing	Ford	325	48
10	1	Jamie McMurray	Chip Ganassi Racing	Chevrolet	325	27
11	14	Clint Bowyer	Stewart–Haas Racing	Ford	325	28
12	6	Trevor Bayne	Roush Fenway Racing	Ford	325	26
13	17	Ricky Stenhouse Jr.	Roush Fenway Racing	Ford	325	28
14	77	Erik Jones (R)	Furniture Row Racing	Toyota	325	26
15	13	Ty Dillon (R)	Germain Racing	Chevrolet	325	22
16	18	Kyle Busch	Joe Gibbs Racing	Toyota	325	21
17	10	Danica Patrick	Stewart–Haas Racing	Ford	325	20
18	21	Ryan Blaney	Wood Brothers Racing	Ford	324	19
19	48	Jimmie Johnson	Hendrick Motorsports	Chevrolet	324	19
20	72	Cole Whitt	TriStar Motorsports	Chevrolet	324	17
21	19	Daniel Suárez (R)	Joe Gibbs Racing	Toyota	323	16
22	34	Landon Cassill	Front Row Motorsports	Ford	323	15
23	38	David Ragan	Front Row Motorsports	Ford	323	14
24	37	Chris Buescher	JTG Daugherty Racing	Chevrolet	323	13
25	27	Paul Menard	Richard Childress Racing	Chevrolet	322	12
26	47	A. J. Allmendinger	JTG Daugherty Racing	Chevrolet	322	11
27	43	Aric Almirola	Richard Petty Motorsports	Ford	321	10
28	32	Matt DiBenedetto	Go Fas Racing	Ford	321	9
29	95	Michael McDowell	Leavine Family Racing	Chevrolet	320	8
30	88	Dale Earnhardt Jr.	Hendrick Motorsports	Chevrolet	320	7
31	15	Reed Sorenson	Premium Motorsports	Chevrolet	320	6
32	3	Austin Dillon	Richard Childress Racing	Chevrolet	319	10
33	33	Jeffrey Earnhardt	Circle Sport – The Motorsports Group	Chevrolet	317	4
34	83	Corey LaJoie (R)	BK Racing	Toyota	313	3
35	31	Ryan Newman	Richard Childress Racing	Chevrolet	309	15
36	55	Derrike Cope	Premium Motorsports	Chevrolet	298	1
37	23	Gray Gaulding (R)	BK Racing	Toyota	253	1
38	11	Denny Hamlin	Joe Gibbs Racing	Toyota	182	4
39	51	Cody Ware	Rick Ware Racing	Chevrolet	74	1
Official race results

=== Race statistics ===
- Lead changes: 5 among different drivers
- Cautions/Laps: 6 for 32
- Red flags: 0
- Time of race: 3 hours, 33 minutes and 8 seconds
- Average speed: 140.898 miles per hour (226.753 km/h)

== Media ==
=== Television ===
The Folds of Honor QuikTrip 500 was carried by Fox in the United States. Mike Joy, five-time Atlanta winner Jeff Gordon and three-time Atlanta winner Darrell Waltrip worked the race from the booth. Pit road was manned by Jamie Little, Vince Welch and Matt Yocum.

Fox
Booth announcers	Pit reporters
Lap-by-lap: Mike Joy; Color-commentator: Jeff Gordon; Color commentator: Darrell Waltrip	Jamie Little; Vince Welch; Matt Yocum

=== Radio ===
The race was broadcast on radio by the Performance Racing Network and simulcast on Sirius XM NASCAR Radio. Doug Rice, Mark Garrow and Wendy Venturini called the race from the booth when the field raced down the front stretch. Rob Albright called the race from atop a billboard outside of turn 2 when the field raced through turns 1 and 2. Pat Patterson called the race from a billboard outside of turn 3 when the field raced through turns 3 and 4. On pit road, PRN was manned by Brad Gillie, Brett McMillan, Jim Noble and Doug Turnbull.

PRN
Booth announcers	Turn announcers	Pit reporters
Lead announcer: Doug Rice; Announcer: Mark Garrow; Announcer: Wendy Venturini	Turns 1 & 2: Rob Albright; Turns 3 & 4: Pat Patterson	Brad Gillie; Brett McMillan; Jim Noble; Doug Turnbull

== Standings after the race ==
Drivers' Championship standings

	Pos	Driver	Points
3	1	Kevin Harvick	90
1	2	Kurt Busch	86 (–4)
9	3	Brad Keselowski	84 (–6)
4	4	Chase Elliott	82 (–8)
2	5	Joey Logano	80 (–10)
1	6	Kyle Larson	79 (–11)
10	7	Martin Truex Jr.	67 (–23)
6	8	Ryan Blaney	63 (–27)
4	9	Kasey Kahne	63 (–27)
1	10	Trevor Bayne	58 (–32)
6	11	A. J. Allmendinger	50 (–40)
8	12	Jamie McMurray	49 (–41)
7	13	Aric Almirola	47 (–43)
9	14	Clint Bowyer	46 (–44)
5	15	Paul Menard	44 (–46)
16	16	Matt Kenseth	41 (–49)
Official driver's standings

Manufacturers' Championship standings

Pos	Manufacturer	Points
1	Ford	80
2	Chevrolet	69 (–11)
3	Toyota	63 (–17)
Official manufacturers' standings

- Note: Only the first 16 positions are included for the driver standings.

Previous race: 2017 Daytona 500	Monster Energy NASCAR Cup Series; 2017 season	Next race: 2017 Kobalt 400
