= Furniture Row Racing =

Former NASCAR team

- Owner: Barney Visser
- Base: Denver, Colorado
- Series: Cup Series; Busch Series
- Manufacturer: Toyota
- Opened: 2005
- Closed: 2018

Career
- Debut: Cup Series: 2005 MBNA NASCAR RacePoints 400 (Dover); Busch Series: 2005 Pepsi 300 (Nashville)
- Latest race: Cup Series: 2018 Ford EcoBoost 400 (Homestead); Busch Series: 2006 Arizona.Travel 200 (Phoenix)
- Races competed: Total: 326; Cup Series: 307; Busch Series: 19
- Drivers' Championships: Total: 1 Cup Series: 1; 2017; Busch Series: 0
- Race victories: Total: 18; Cup Series: 18; Busch Series: 0
- Pole positions: Total: 14; Cup Series: 14; Busch Series: 0

Furniture Row Racing (FRR) was an American professional stock car racing team that competed in the NASCAR Cup Series from 2005 to 2018. The team was owned and sponsored by Furniture Row, a U.S. furniture store chain, and was based in Furniture Row's home city of Denver, Colorado, being the only NASCAR team headquartered west of the Mississippi River. FRR most recently fielded the No. 78 Toyota Camry full-time for Martin Truex Jr. FRR won their first and only championship in 2017 with Truex, becoming the first winner of the Cup Series under Monster Energy sponsorship. The team was also the first single-car team ever to make the Chase for the Sprint Cup, which it did in 2013 with Kurt Busch and again in 2015, 2016, 2017, and 2018 with Truex.

From 2016 to 2018 Furniture Row Racing had a technical alliance with fellow Toyota team Joe Gibbs Racing; previously, from 2010 until the end of 2015, the team had an alliance with Richard Childress Racing under the Chevrolet banner.

Following the 2018 season, Furniture Row Racing closed its doors and sold its charter to Spire Sports + Entertainment, which is currently competing as Spire Motorsports. Much of the former FRR team currently operates under Falci Adaptive Motorsports, a nonprofit organization dedicated to providing adaptive motor racing to people with physical disabilities.

== Busch Series ==
=== Car No. 78 history ===
Furniture Row Racing made its NASCAR debut in the Busch Series at Nashville Superspeedway in 2005 with Jerry Robertson driving, starting 24th and finishing 33rd. Robertson ran ten races with the team in 2005 and nine in 2006, with his best finish being a 22nd at California Speedway in 2005.

==== Car No. 78 results ====
Year	Driver	No.	Make	1	2	3	4	5	6	7	8	9	10	11	12	13	14	15	16	17	18	19	20	21	22	23	24	25	26	27	28	29	30	31	32	33	34	35	Owners	Pts
2005	Jerry Robertson	78	Chevy	DAY	CAL	MXC	LVS; DNQ	ATL	NSH; 33	BRI	TEX; 25	PHO; 23	TAL	DAR	RCH; 40	CLT	DOV	NSH; 37	KEN; DNQ	MLW	DAY	CHI; 34	NHA	PPR; 29	GTY	IRP	GLN	MCH; DNQ	BRI	CAL; 22	RCH; DNQ	DOV	KAN; 39	CLT	MEM	TEX; 35	PHO	HOM; DNQ	50th	710
2006	Jerry Robertson	78	Chevy	DAY	CAL	MXC	LVS	ATL	BRI	TEX	NSH	PHO; 40	TAL	RCH; 29	DAR	CLT	DOV	NSH; DNQ	KEN	MLW	DAY	CHI; 36	NHA	MAR; 32	GTY	IRP	GLN	MCH; DNQ	BRI	CAL; 39	RCH; 29	DOV	KAN; 42	CLT	MEM; 42	TEX; DNQ	PHO; 41	HOM	52nd	564

== Cup Series ==
=== Car No. 77/87 history ===
2008

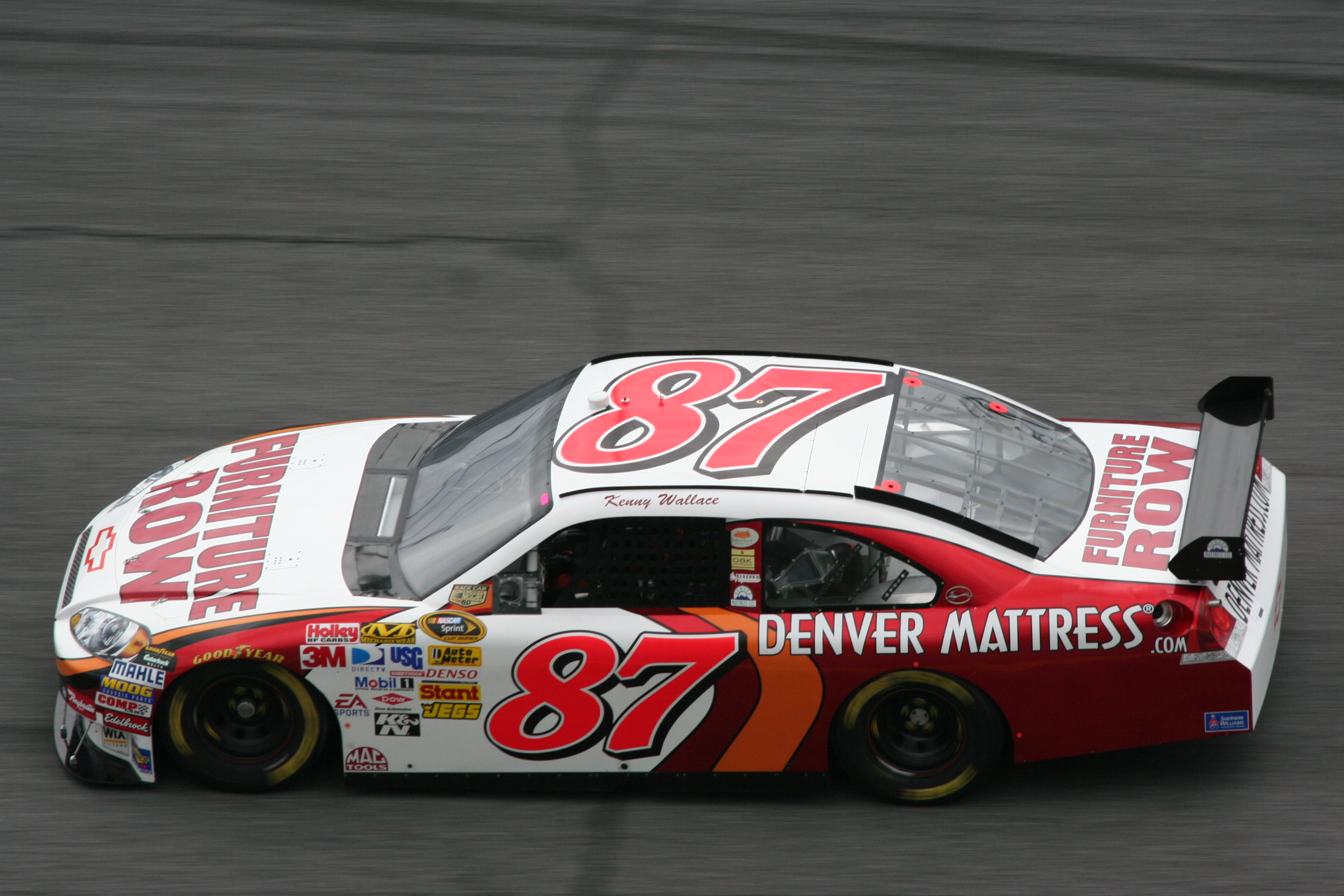
Kenny Wallace's 2008 No. 87 car at Daytona

Furniture Row Racing entered a second car for the first time in 2008, entering the No. 87 car for Kenny Wallace for the Daytona 500. In early 2008, Wallace returned to Furniture Row to drive in the Daytona 500 in a car that was supposed to serve as a safety net for Nemechek in case his team didn't make the field. Instead, Nemechek locked himself into the field with a third place qualifying run, and Wallace secured a spot in the race in the Gatorade Duels.

==== Car No. 87 results ====
Year	Driver	No.	Make	1	2	3	4	5	6	7	8	9	10	11	12	13	14	15	16	17	18	19	20	21	22	23	24	25	26	27	28	29	30	31	32	33	34	35	36	Owners	Pts
2008	Kenny Wallace	87	Chevy	DAY; 43	CAL	LVS	ATL	BRI	MAR	TEX	PHO	TAL	RCH	DAR	CLT	DOV	POC	MCH	SON	NHA	DAY	CHI	IND	POC	GLN	MCH	BRI	CAL	RCH	NHA	DOV	KAN	TAL	CLT	MAR	ATL	TEX	PHO	HOM	58th	134

Erik Jones (2017)

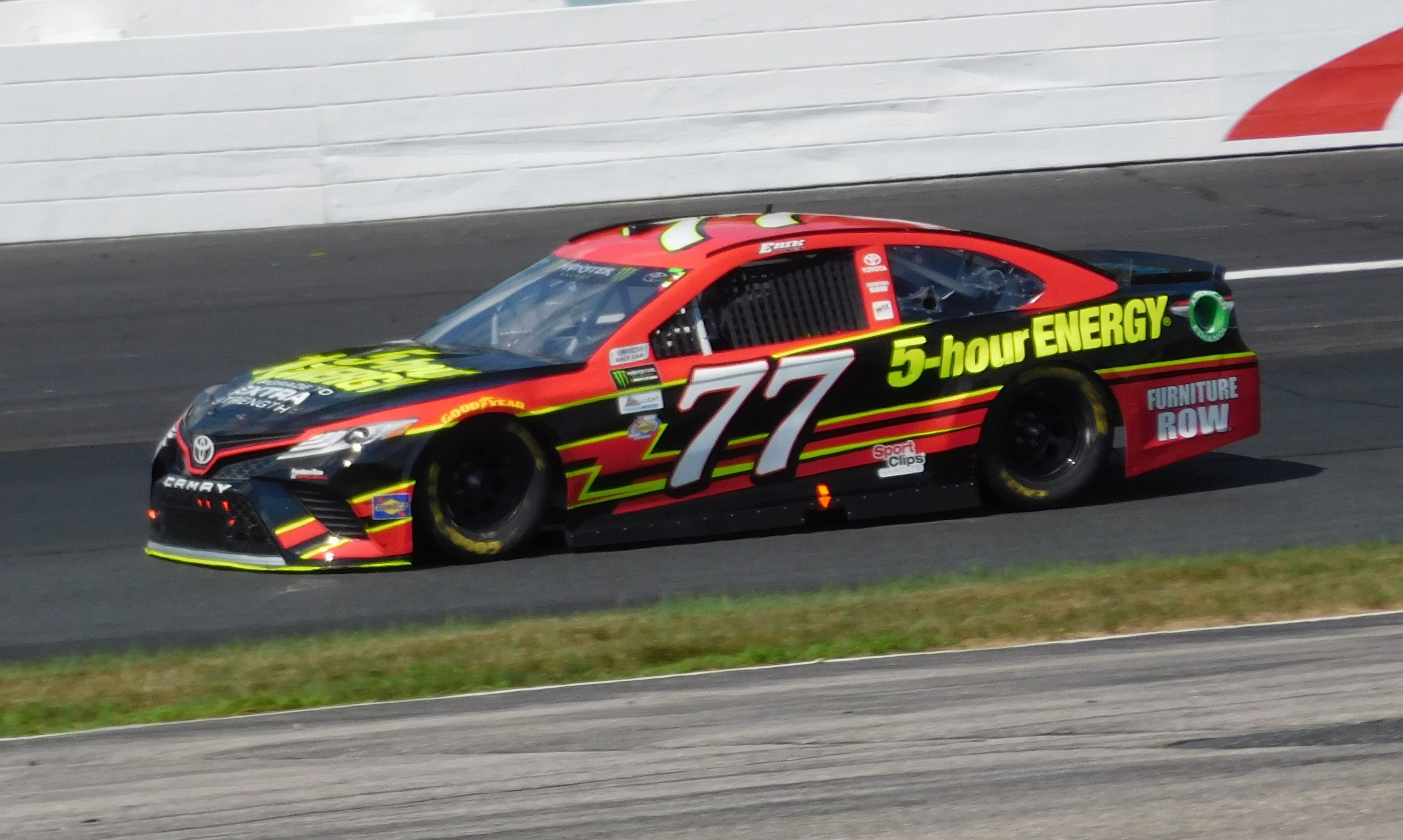
Erik Jones driving the FRR No. 77 car at New Hampshire Motor Speedway in 2017.

On August 7, 2016, Furniture Row Racing announced that Erik Jones would compete full-time in the Cup Series with backing from 5 Hour Energy. It marked the return of the No. 77 for the first time since Charlotte fall in 2014, then operated by Randy Humphrey Racing. In December 2016, Furniture Row Racing purchased the charter of the No. 62 owned by Jay Robinson and used it for the No. 77, guaranteeing the team a spot in every race of the 2017 season. Jones was on loan from Joe Gibbs Racing. In the Coca-Cola 600, Jones had a career best finish in 7th place, but Austin Dillon would go onto win the race. At Pocono Jones improved his best career finish and collected his first top 5 finish by finishing 3rd. At Kentucky, Jones took a 6th-place finish for his fifth top ten of the season.

On July 11, it was announced that Jones would leave the team after the 2017 season for his long anticipated move to the JGR No. 20 car in 2018, but 5 Hour Energy will have to stay with the team due to the viceroy rule and Monster Energy being the series sponsor. Following Jones' announced departure, Furniture Row Racing sold their No. 77 charter to JTG Daugherty Racing for the No. 37 team and announced that they would indefinitely close the No. 77 team at the end of the season, while also saying that the 77 was not just a one-year thing.

==== Car No. 77 results ====
Year	Driver	No.	Make	1	2	3	4	5	6	7	8	9	10	11	12	13	14	15	16	17	18	19	20	21	22	23	24	25	26	27	28	29	30	31	32	33	34	35	36	Owners	Pts
2017	Erik Jones	77	Toyota	DAY; 39	ATL; 14	LVS; 15	PHO; 8	CAL; 12	MAR; 12	TEX; 22	BRI; 17	RCH; 38	TAL; 33	KAN; 22	CLT; 7	DOV; 15	POC; 3	MCH; 13	SON; 25	DAY; 9	KEN; 6	NHA; 39	IND; 31	POC; 8	GLN; 10	MCH; 3	BRI; 2*	DAR; 5	RCH; 6	CHI; 33	NHA; 6	DOV; 12	CLT; 17	TAL; 36	KAN; 35	MAR; 26	TEX; 10	PHO; 4	HOM; 21	19th	863

=== Car No. 78 history ===
Early years (2005–2008)

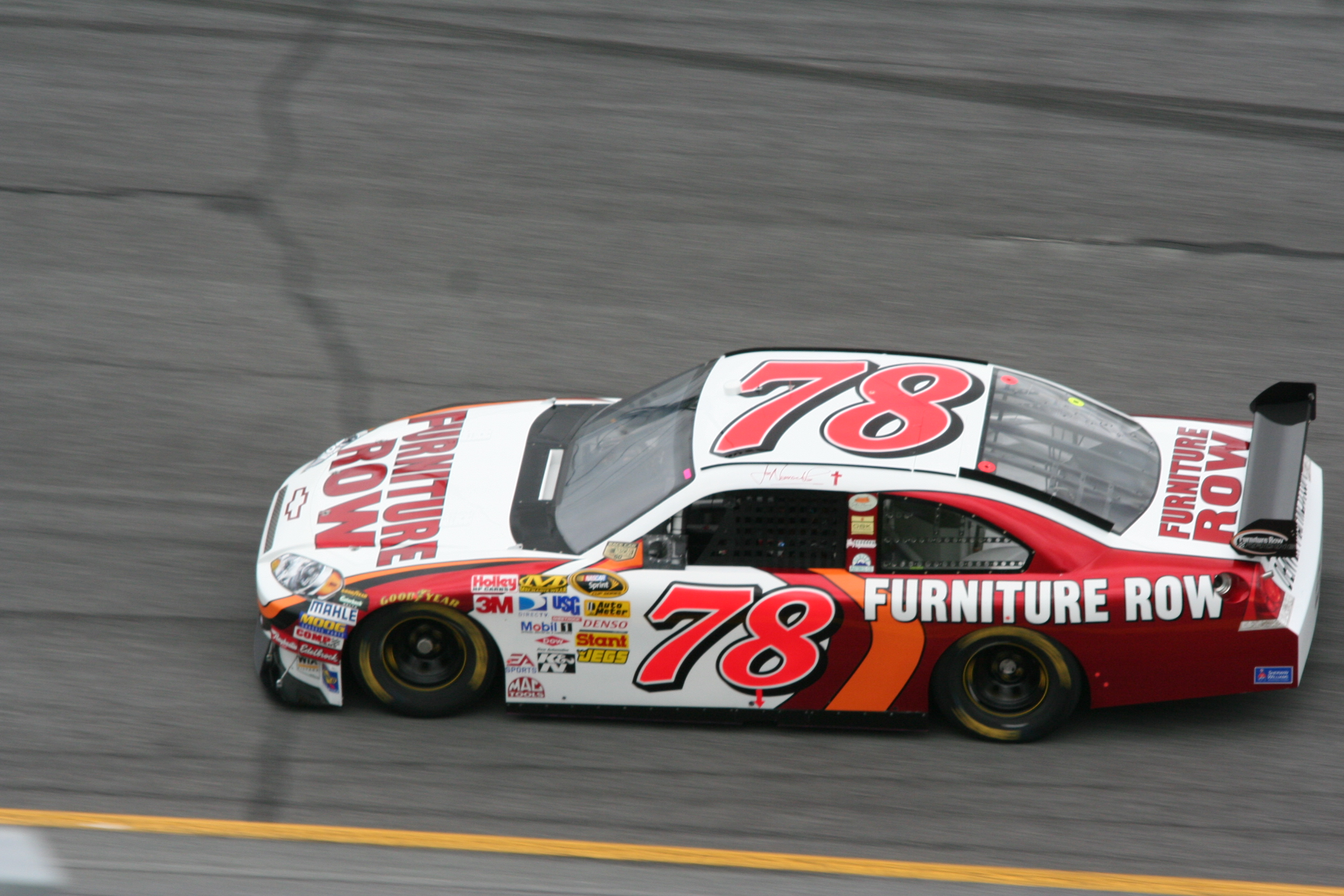
Joe Nemechek in the No. 78 at Daytona in 2008.

In 2005, the team made two NEXTEL Cup appearances with Kenny Wallace debuting the team at Dover International Speedway, and Robertson running at Phoenix International Raceway.

Wallace was scheduled to drive the first five races in 2006, with Robertson filling out the rest of the schedule. At the 2006 Daytona 500, Wallace failed to put the No. 78 Furniture Row car in the field. Wallace qualified for the next two races, at California Speedway and Las Vegas Motor Speedway, finishing 41st and 38th, respectively. However, the performance of the team was not good enough to make the top 35 in points, and the team ran with various drivers for the rest of the year; Jimmy Spencer (both Pocono races) and Travis Kvapil (at road courses) also drove the car. FRR also teamed up with PPI Motorsports to share equipment and resources throughout the season. Robertson competed in select Busch Series events in 2006, his best finish being 29th.

Wallace was hired to continue to be the full-time driver in 2007. He had two sixth-place starts that season, but was released in August 2007. After Scott Wimmer and Sterling Marlin failed to qualify in the following weeks, Joe Nemechek was named the permanent driver. FRR completed a three-year contract with Nemechek (2008–2010) towards the end of the season. Nemechek locked himself into the field with a third place qualifying run in the 2008 Daytona 500. At the spring Talladega race, he gave the team their first pole. In the fall race at that track, Nemechek gave FRR its then-best finish ever of 11th.

Regan Smith (2009–2012)

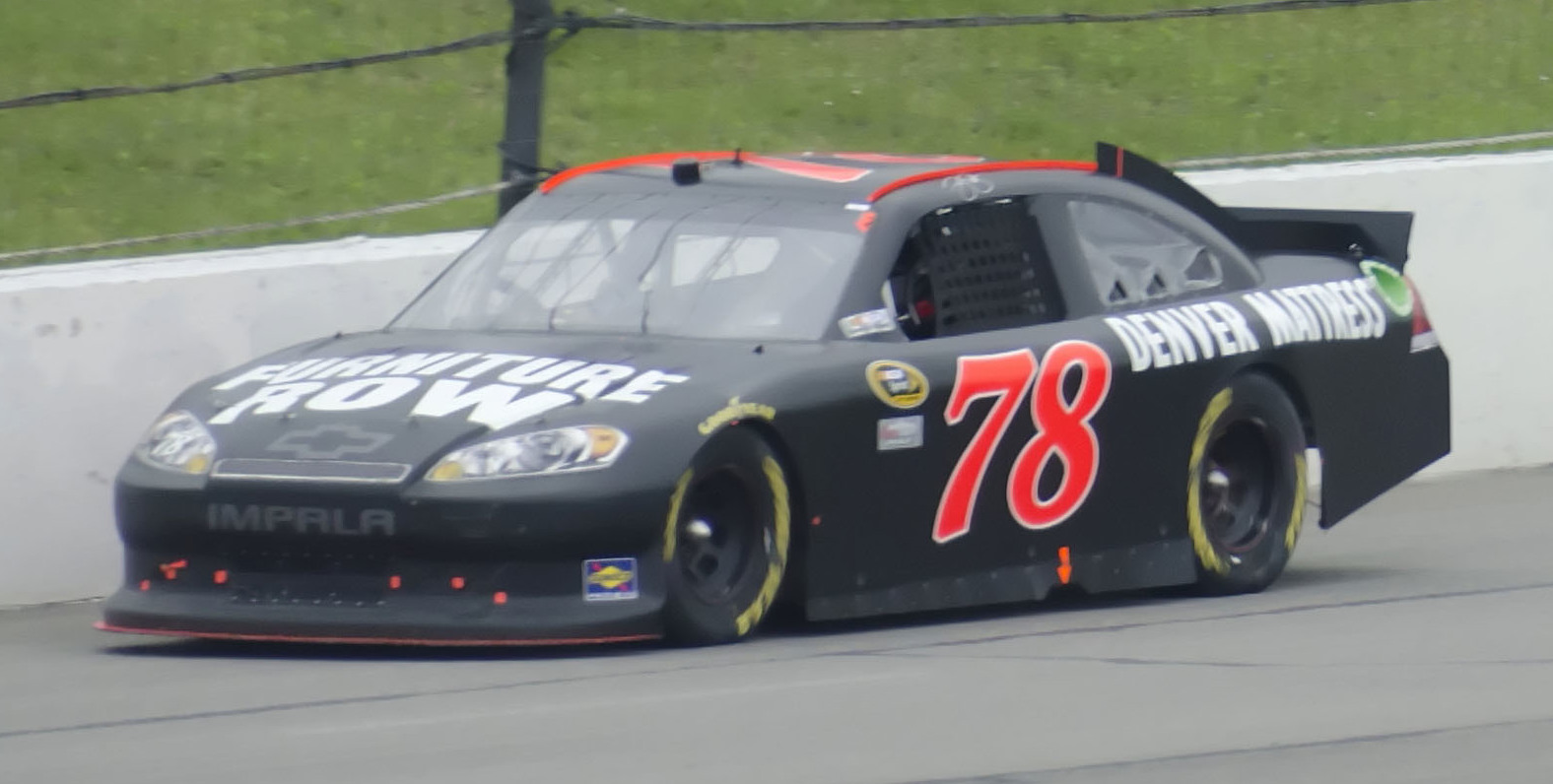
Regan Smith in the No. 78 at Pocono Raceway in 2011

For 2009, the team announced it would cut back to a part-time schedule due to financial constraints. Nemechek was to remain as the driver, but the team bought out the rest of his contract after he refused to run a partial schedule. Regan Smith ran 18 races in the No. 78 car in 2009.

FRR resumed full-time duties in 2010. The team aligned with Richard Childress Racing and earned top 35 status for the first five races of 2010 by purchasing the owner points from RCR's No. 07 car. Childress was listed as the official owner of the No. 78.

On November 15, 2010, the Furniture Row Racing transporter and motorcoach were destroyed in an accident on Interstate 25 about forty miles from the team's Denver headquarters. Richard Childress Racing provided the team a fully equipped transporter for Furniture Row's use at Homestead.

At the 2011 Daytona 500, Smith gave Furniture Row its first top ten, with a seventh-place finish. On May 7, 2011, Smith gave Furniture Row its first top five finish, and first victory, at Darlington Raceway in the Southern 500, holding off Carl Edwards. In 2012, the team struggled mightily, and Pete Rondeau was replaced as crew chief by former RCR crew chief Todd Berrier before Indy. The addition of Berrier resulted in the first back to back top-10 finishes (both 9th places) for FRR and Smith.

Kurt Busch (2012–2013)

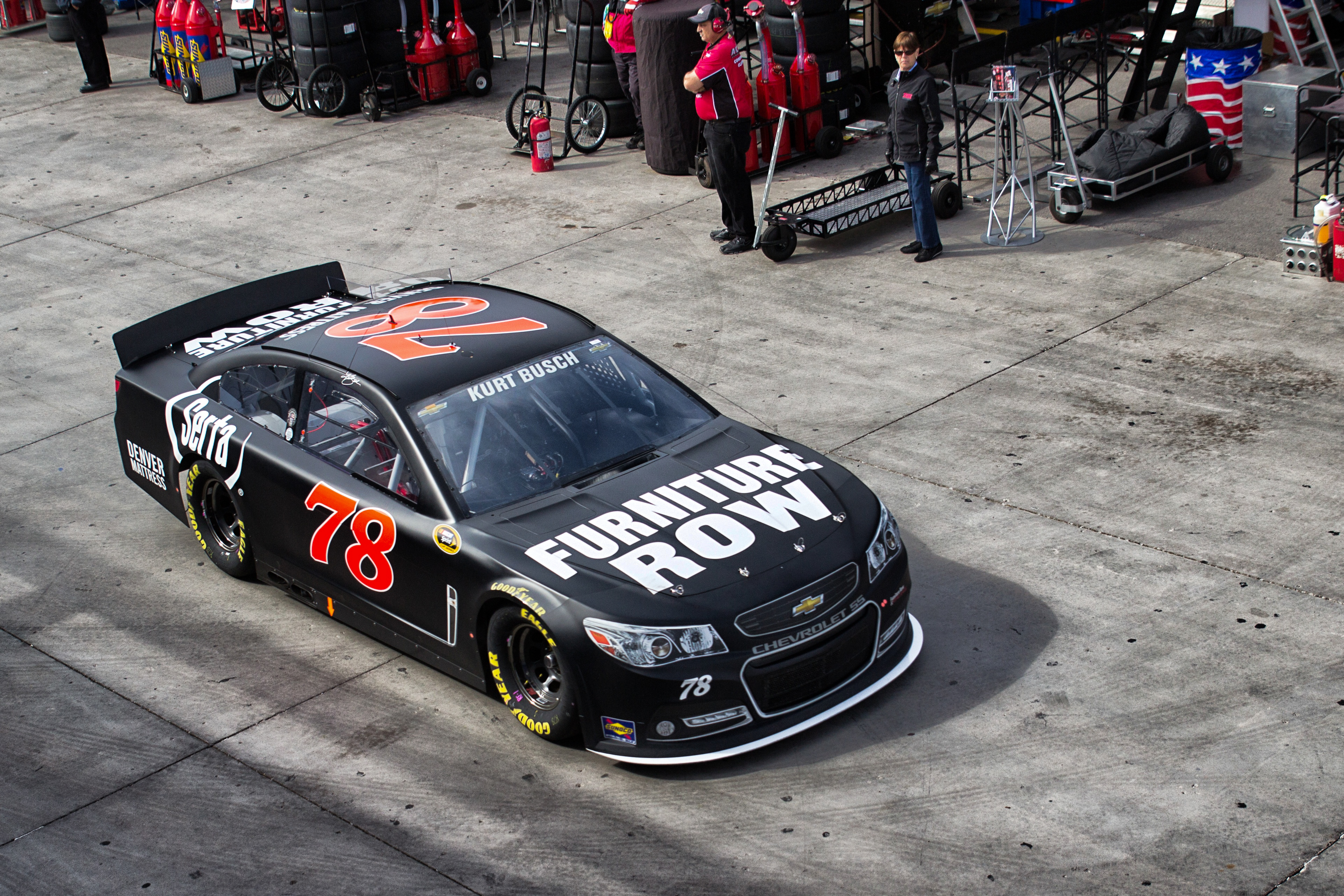
Kurt Busch at Las Vegas Motor Speedway in 2013

Despite Berrier bringing Smith two top ten finishes and one top-five finish, manager Joe Garone announced that Smith would be replaced by Kurt Busch beginning with the 2012 Bank of America 500 at Charlotte.

In the 2013 season, Busch improved the status of Furniture Row as a team, with the car becoming more competitive and running in contention more frequently than not. In the first 26 races, Busch recorded 8 top five and 13 top ten finishes, and one pole position (at Darlington in May). These were statistics easily comparable to drivers who were running with the powerhouse teams. The team also had low points, such as a scary wreck in the May race at Talladega that saw Busch flip over and land on top of Ryan Newman in turn 3 with six laps to go. A number of poor finishes, and errors like crashes at New Hampshire and Martinsville, plus a dead battery while leading under a red flag at the Coca-Cola 600, kept the team hovering on the Chase bubble. A streak of top ten finishes by Busch in August, combined with a second-place finish at Richmond, secured the team a Chase berth entry. This marked Busch's eighth season making the Chase. This also made Furniture Row Racing the first ever single car team to race into the Chase.

The car was sponsored by Furniture Row for most of the season, except at Talladega that October, when the car was sponsored by Wonder Bread, in tribute to Talladega Nights: The Ballad of Ricky Bobby. This was the second time Busch has driven a car with a Talladega Nights-based paint job at Talladega, with the other time being a car based on the "ME" paint job in May 2012 during his tenure with Phoenix Racing.

Martin Truex Jr. (2014–2018)

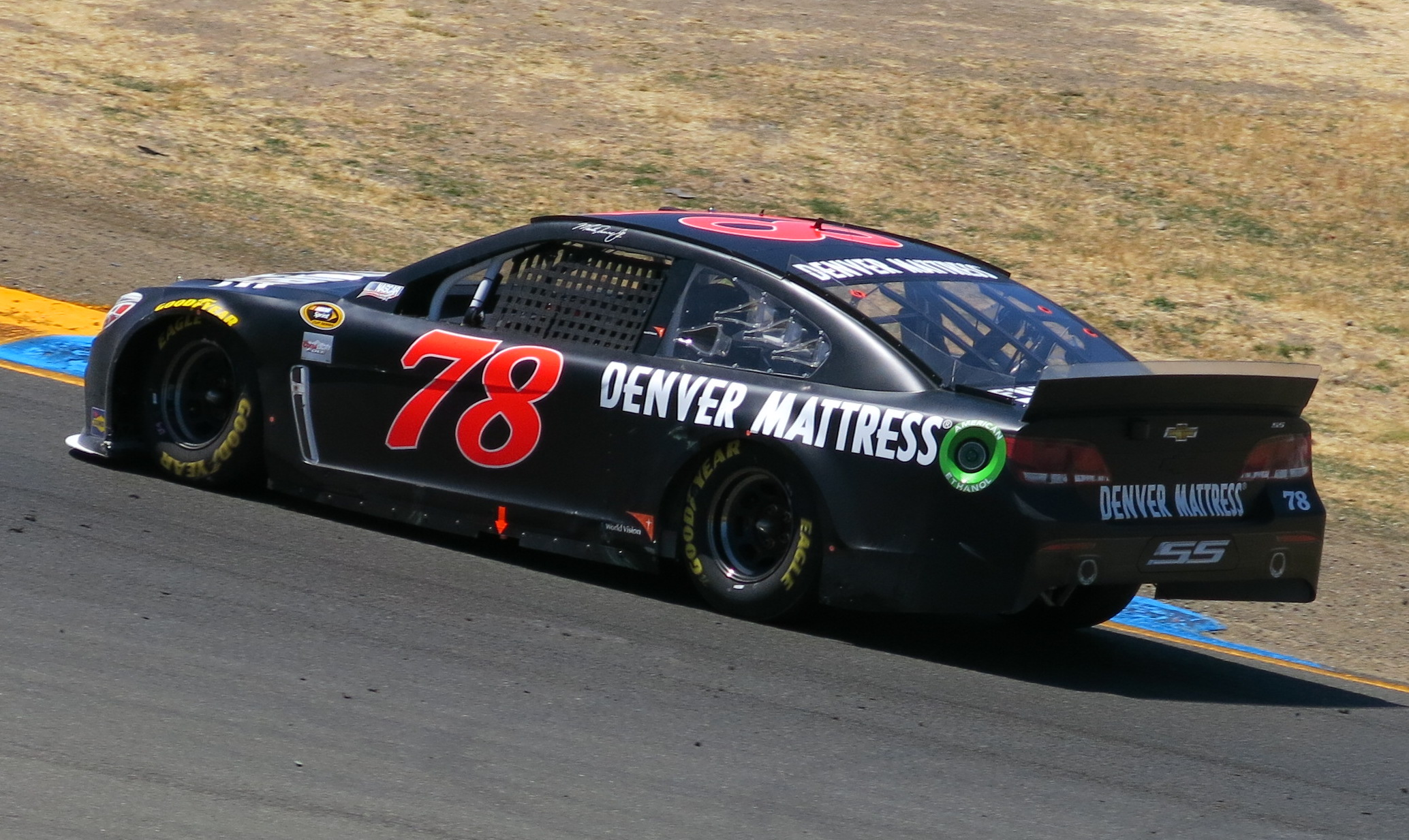
Martin Truex Jr. in the No. 78 at Sonoma Raceway in 2014

In August 2013, it was announced that Busch would not be returning to FRR for 2014, as he had signed with Gene Haas to drive with Stewart–Haas Racing starting at the 2014 Daytona 500. The team also announced that they had extended their alliance with RCR. For close to two months, speculation over who would replace Busch at Furniture Row had suggested Juan Pablo Montoya to be the most likely candidate, as Montoya was to be replaced in the No. 42 at Chip Ganassi Racing by Kyle Larson. Other potential candidates being Jeff Burton and Bobby Labonte, veterans who had not yet secured rides for 2014. However, Montoya eventually announced that he would join Team Penske in the IndyCar Series. In early October, after Michael Waltrip Racing announced that their No. 56 team was being cut to a part-time team due to the loss of NAPA Auto Parts as a sponsor in the fallout from the Spingate scandal at Richmond, it was reported that Furniture Row was in talks with Martin Truex Jr. to potentially sign him.

Prior to the November race at Texas, it was announced and confirmed that Truex had signed a multi-year deal to drive for FRR beginning at the 2014 Daytona 500. The announcement also added that FRR had hired all of the crewmen from Truex's MWR team as well.

The team's performance declined slightly in 2014, with Truex scoring only five top tens, leading only one lap and finishing 24th in the standings. At the end of the season, the team released crew chief Todd Berrier, hiring rookie crew chief Cole Pearn.

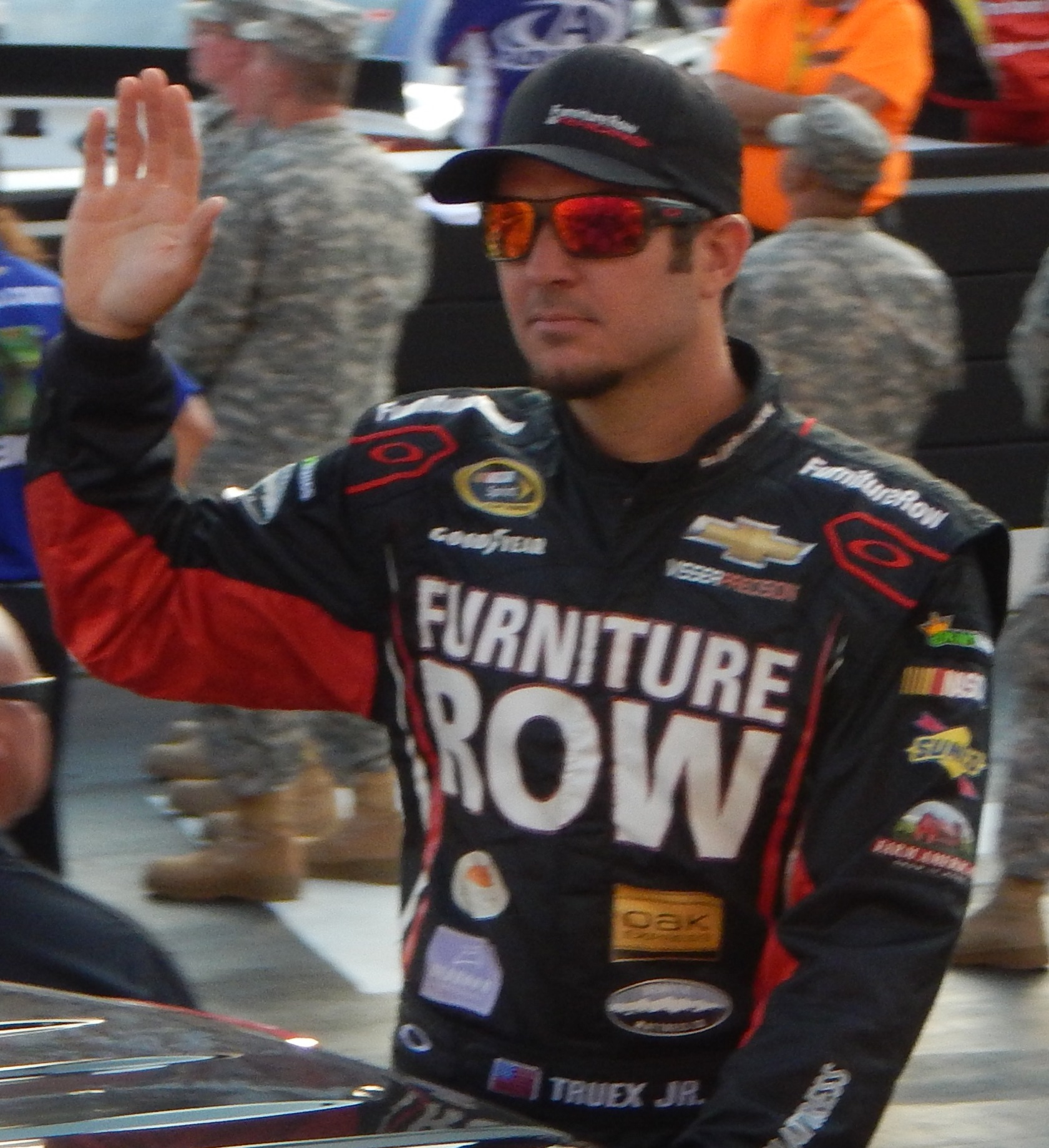
Martin Truex Jr. scored the team's second win and second Chase berth in 2015.

Truex's performance dramatically improved during the 2015 season, largely due to the new driver-crew chief relationship between Truex and Cole Pearn. During the Daytona 500, Truex led one lap and finished 8th. Truex earned nine top tens throughout the first 10 races, finishing second at Las Vegas. He led the most laps at Kansas and appeared on his way to a win, when a poor pit stop shuffled him to a ninth-place finish. After leading the most laps for four-consecutive races, Truex and Furniture Row finally broke into victory lane, winning the Axalta "We Paint Winners" 400 at Pocono Raceway in June getting Furniture Row Racing its 1st Sprint Cup victory since the Southern 500 in 2011 and breaking a 69 race winless streak for Truex. The win locked Truex and the team into the Chase for the Sprint Cup for 2015 and put him second in the standings. The next week, Truex would finish 3rd in a rain shortened race at Michigan International Speedway becoming the first driver since Richard Petty in 1969 to score 14 top 10s in the first 15 races of the season. Truex would not visit victory lane for the rest of the year but did score a total of 22 top 10s, including 8 top 5s, and finished 4th in the championship standings after racing his way to the championship 4 at Homestead.

On September 27, 2015, it was confirmed that Truex had re-signed with Furniture Row for 2016 and beyond. The team also announced a switch to Toyota in 2016, receiving a technical alliance with Joe Gibbs Racing and engines from Toyota Racing Development. Truex would win his second race with Furniture Row on May 29, 2016 after leading a record-breaking 392 of 400 laps of the Coca-Cola 600 at Charlotte. Truex was able to score his first multi-win season as he won the Southern 500 at Darlington and then scored off a victory at Chicagoland passing leader Ryan Blaney with 4 laps to go. Truex scored his fourth win of the season two races later at Dover, However, for the 78, the car lost the engine at Talladega, cutting the car from the Chase.

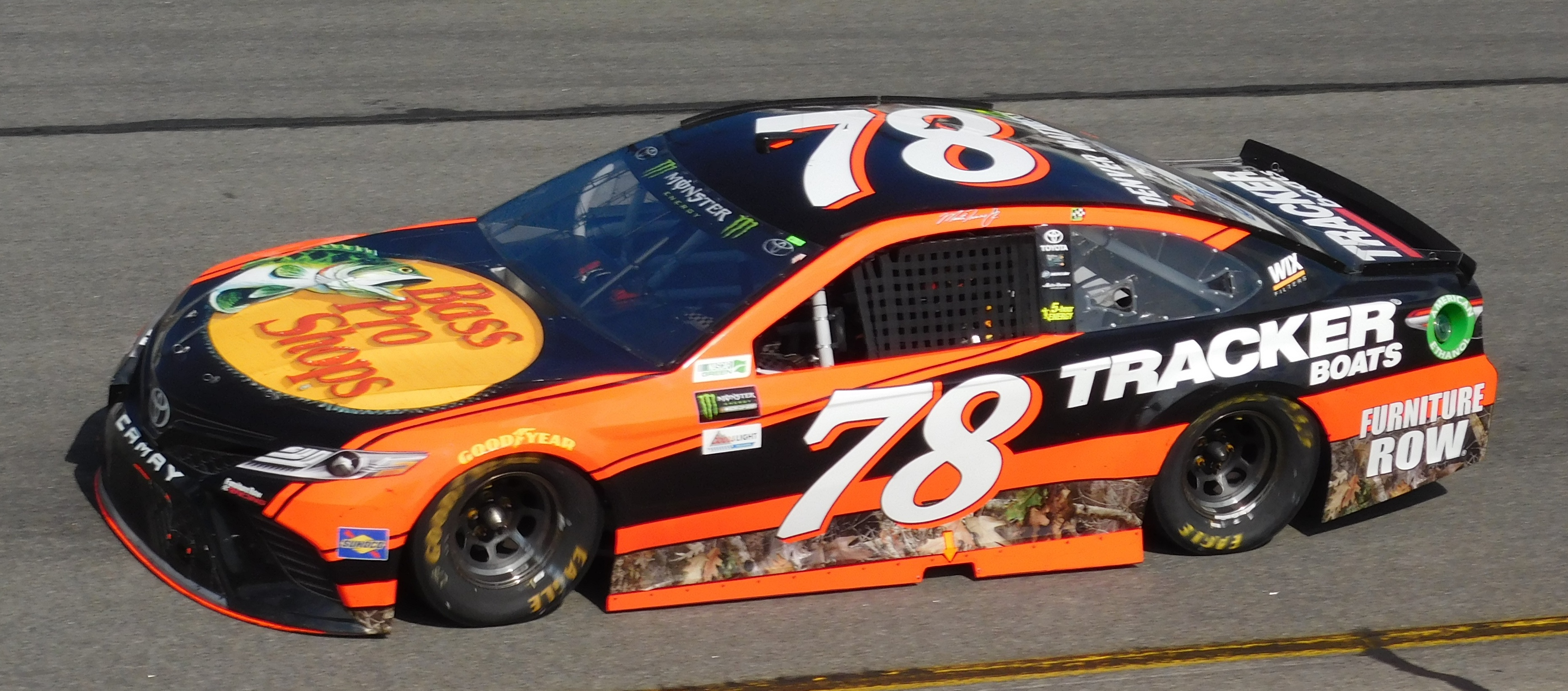
Truex's No. 78 car during the 2017 Toyota Owners 400

At the 2017 Daytona 500, Truex was the race leader with two laps to go, but Kyle Larson passed him in the second turn and Truex ended up finishing 13th. At Las Vegas, Truex led the most laps (150) and became the first NASCAR driver to win all three stages. Truex and Brad Keselowski battled for the win late and with two to go, Keselowski had engine trouble and Truex scored his first victory of the season. At Kansas, Truex battled with Ryan Blaney all night and led the most laps with 104, beating out Blaney. At the Coca-Cola 600, Truex dominated, leading 273 laps while Erik Jones had a career best finish in seventh place, but Austin Dillon eventually won the race. Truex dominated again at Kentucky, winning all three stages and leading the most laps, battling Kyle Busch on several restarts throughout the race for the win.

At the 2017 Brickyard 400, Truex battled Busch for the lead late in the race, but accidentally wrecked Busch, taking both himself and Busch out of the race and foiling Busch from being the first driver in the history of the speedway to three-peat. The wreck caused a lot of controversy in the Toyota operation. Following the incident, Furniture Row Racing and Joe Gibbs Racing suspended three No. 78 crew members for confronting Busch's crew chief Adam Stevens.

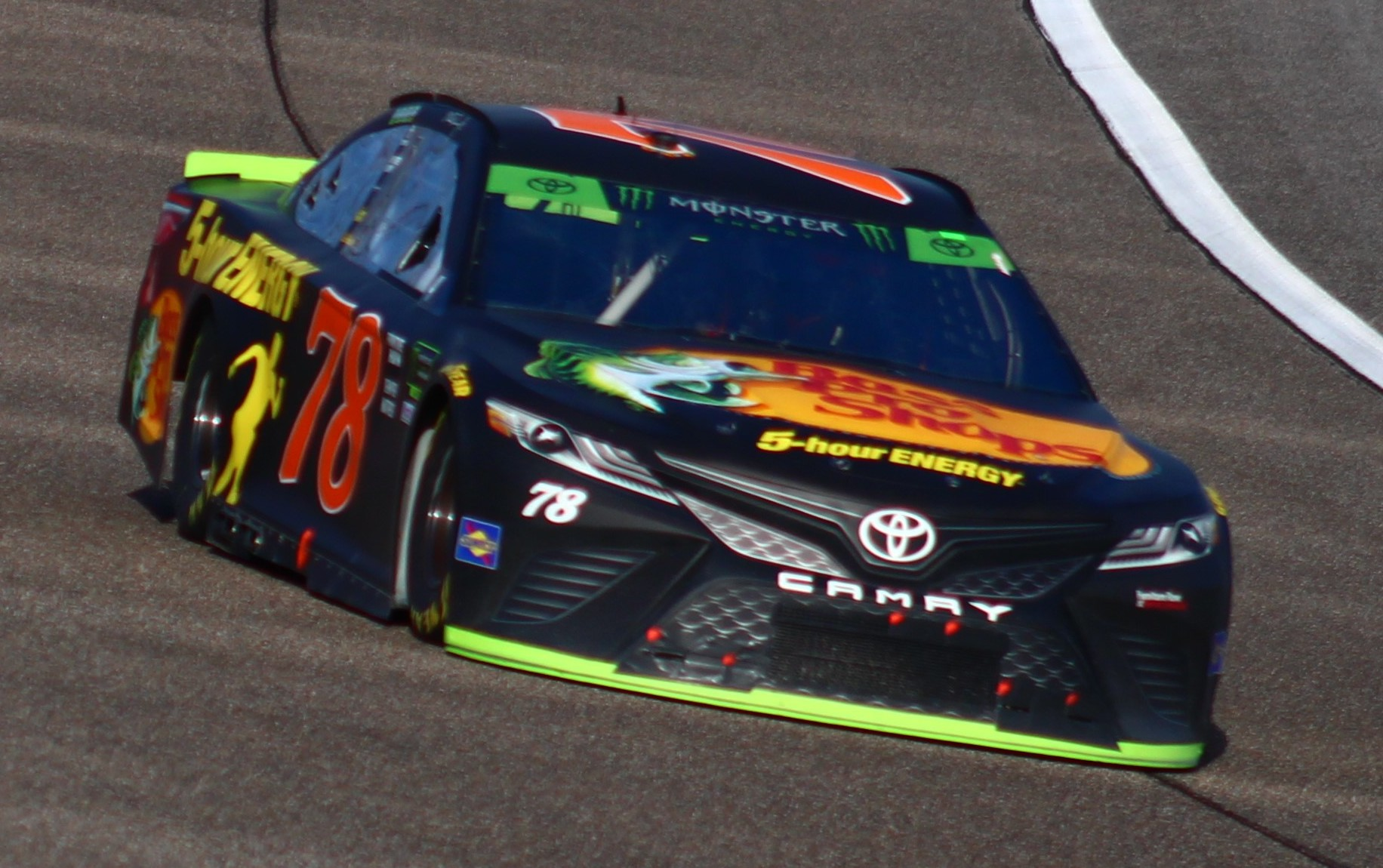
Truex's No. 78 during the team's final race at Homestead–Miami Speedway in 2018

Following all of their success throughout the playoffs and regular season, the No. 78 team won the 2017 Monster Energy NASCAR Cup Series at Homestead after leading a fitting 78 laps.

Truex started off the season with an 18th-place finish in the Daytona 500, after being caught up in a late race wreck. For the next few weeks, he picked up top five finishes in five straight races, including two poles, and a win at California. Truex scored three additional wins at Pocono, Sonoma, and Kentucky. He stayed consistent enough to make it to the Championship 4. Truex finished second at Homestead and in the points standings.

On September 4, 2018, Barney Visser announced that with the loss of major sponsor 5-hour Energy, he had no choice but to announce that the team would cease operation at the end of the 2018 season, one year after winning their first championship title. On November 7, 2018, it was announced that Truex and Pearn would move to the No. 19 team of Joe Gibbs Racing replacing Daniel Suárez (who moved to the no. 41 car of Stewart–Haas Racing). The No. 78's charter was eventually sold to Spire Sports + Entertainment on December 4, 2018, and currently runs in the Cup Series as Spire Motorsports No. 77.

==== Car No. 78 results ====
Year	Driver	No.	Make	1	2	3	4	5	6	7	8	9	10	11	12	13	14	15	16	17	18	19	20	21	22	23	24	25	26	27	28	29	30	31	32	33	34	35	36	Owners	Pts
2005	Kenny Wallace	78	Chevy	DAY	CAL	LVS	ATL	BRI	MAR	TEX	PHO	TAL	DAR	RCH	CLT	DOV	POC	MCH	SON	DAY	CHI	NHA	POC	IND	GLN	MCH	BRI	CAL	RCH	NHA	DOV; 34	TAL	KAN	CLT	MAR	ATL	TEX			64th	101
2005	Jerry Robertson	78	Chevy																																			PHO; 43	HOM	64th	101
2006	Kenny Wallace	78	Chevy	DAY; DNQ	CAL; 41	LVS; 38	ATL; DNQ	BRI; DNQ	MAR; DNQ	TEX; DNQ	PHO; 25	TAL; DNQ	RCH; 25	DAR; DNQ	CLT; 29	DOV; 38				DAY; DNQ	CHI; 38	NHA; 42		IND; 32		MCH; DNQ	BRI; 30	CAL; 39	RCH; 37	NHA; DNQ	DOV; DNQ	KAN; 31	TAL; 42	CLT; DNQ	MAR; 29	ATL; 35	TEX; 30	PHO; DNQ	HOM; DNQ	41st	1495
2006	Jimmy Spencer	78	Chevy														POC; 32	MCH; DNQ					POC; 36																	41st	1495
2006	Travis Kvapil	78	Chevy																SON; DNQ																					41st	1495
2006	Max Papis	78	Chevy																						GLN; DNQ															41st	1495
2007	Kenny Wallace	78	Chevy	DAY; DNQ	CAL; DNQ	LVS; 24	ATL; DNQ	BRI; 21	MAR; DNQ	TEX; 42	PHO; 40	TAL; 26	RCH; 39	DAR; 24	CLT; 34	DOV; DNQ	POC; DNQ	MCH; DNQ	SON; DNQ	NHA; DNQ	DAY; 25	CHI; DNQ	IND; DNQ	POC; DNQ	GLN; 31															42nd	1654
2007	Scott Wimmer	78	Chevy																							MCH; DNQ														42nd	1654
2007	Sterling Marlin	78	Chevy																								BRI; DNQ													42nd	1654
2007	Joe Nemechek	78	Chevy																									CAL; 43	RCH; 43	NHA; 29	DOV; 22	KAN; 25	TAL; 32	CLT; DNQ	MAR; DNQ	ATL; 36	TEX; 35	PHO; 38	HOM; DNQ	42nd	1654
2008	Joe Nemechek	78	Chevy	DAY; 41	CAL; 34	LVS; DNQ	ATL; 36	BRI; 35	MAR; DNQ	TEX; 37	PHO; 40	TAL; 25	RCH; 29	DAR; 31	CLT; DNQ	DOV; 34	POC; 29	MCH; 28	SON; 26	NHA; 20	DAY; 18	CHI; 39	IND; 29	POC; 41	GLN; 38	MCH; 34	BRI; 29	CAL; 43	RCH; 40	NHA; 43	DOV; 35	KAN; 38	TAL; 11	CLT; 37	MAR; 43	ATL; 42	TEX; 38	PHO; DNQ	HOM; 36	42nd	2092
2009	Regan Smith	78	Chevy	DAY; 21	CAL	LVS; 19	ATL	BRI	MAR	TEX; 31	PHO; 28	TAL; 15	RCH	DAR; 21	CLT	DOV; 22	POC; 33	MCH	SON	NHA; 27	DAY; 12	CHI	IND; 39	POC	GLN	MCH	BRI; 27	ATL; DNQ	RCH; 40	NHA	DOV; 32	KAN	CAL; 28	CLT	MAR	TAL; 39	TEX; 32	PHO; DNQ	HOM; 32	40th	1502
2010	Regan Smith	78	Chevy	DAY; 39	CAL; 19	LVS; 21	ATL; 19	BRI; 36	MAR; 32	PHO; 26	TEX; 21	TAL; 38	RCH; 30	DAR; 17	DOV; 24	CLT; 19	POC; 18	MCH; 23	SON; 38	NHA; 33	DAY; 33	CHI; 20	IND; 33	POC; 21	GLN; 34	MCH; 21	BRI; 30	ATL; 17	RCH; 25	NHA; 19	DOV; 26	KAN; 26	CAL; 12	CLT; 13	MAR; 31	TAL; 12	TEX; 22	PHO; 23	HOM; 17	29th	3229
2011	Regan Smith	78	Chevy	DAY; 7	PHO; 34	LVS; 39	BRI; 22	CAL; 27	MAR; 31	TEX; 37	TAL; 15	RCH; 17	DAR; 1	DOV; 34	CLT; 8	KAN; 24	POC; 15	MCH; 33	SON; 16	DAY; 24	KEN; 17	NHA; 33	IND; 3	POC; 21	GLN; 23	MCH; 13	BRI; 18	ATL; 33	RCH; 18	CHI; 17	NHA; 10	DOV; 17	KAN; 24	CLT; 25	TAL; 30	MAR; 13	TEX; 23	PHO; 38	HOM; 13	26th	820
2012	Regan Smith	78	Chevy	DAY; 24	PHO; 20	LVS; 15	BRI; 24	CAL; 20	MAR; 16	TEX; 23	KAN; 24	RCH; 27	TAL; 40	DAR; 14	CLT; 17	DOV; 27	POC; 16	MCH; 28	SON; 32	KEN; 33	DAY; 34	NHA; 26	IND; 18	POC; 9	GLN; 9	MCH; 29	BRI; 16	ATL; 14	RCH; 24	CHI; 34	NHA; 16	DOV; 17	TAL; 5							24th	848
2012	Kurt Busch	78	Chevy																															CLT; 21	KAN; 25	MAR; 15	TEX; 8	PHO; 8	HOM; 9	24th	848
2013	Kurt Busch	78	Chevy	DAY; 28	PHO; 27	LVS; 20	BRI; 4	CAL; 5	MAR; 37	TEX; 37	KAN; 15	RCH; 9	TAL; 30	DAR; 14	CLT; 3	DOV; 12	POC; 7	MCH; 35	SON; 4	KEN; 6	DAY; 6	NHA; 31	IND; 14	POC; 3	GLN; 9	MCH; 3	BRI; 31	ATL; 4	RCH; 2	CHI; 4	NHA; 13	DOV; 21	KAN; 2	CLT; 14	TAL; 18	MAR; 18	TEX; 17	PHO; 5	HOM; 21	10th	2309
2014	Martin Truex Jr.	78	Chevy	DAY; 43	PHO; 22	LVS; 14	BRI; 36	CAL; 23	MAR; 21	TEX; 18	DAR; 27	RCH; 10	TAL; 17	KAN; 21	CLT; 25	DOV; 6	POC; 9	MCH; 37	SON; 15	KEN; 19	DAY; 15	NHA; 12	IND; 25	POC; 32	GLN; 13	MCH; 36	BRI; 20	ATL; 23	RCH; 25	CHI; 14	NHA; 12	DOV; 7	KAN; 4	CLT; 14	TAL; 27	MAR; 38	TEX; 19	PHO; 12	HOM; 17	24th	857
2015	Martin Truex Jr.	78	Chevy	DAY; 8	ATL; 6	LVS; 2	PHO; 7	CAL; 8	MAR; 6	TEX; 9	BRI; 29	RCH; 10	TAL; 5	KAN; 9*	CLT; 5*	DOV; 6*	POC; 1*	MCH; 3	SON; 42	DAY; 38	KEN; 17	NHA; 12	IND; 4	POC; 19	GLN; 25	MCH; 3	BRI; 28	DAR; 9	RCH; 32	CHI; 13	NHA; 8	DOV; 11	CLT; 3	KAN; 15	TAL; 7	MAR; 6	TEX; 8	PHO; 14	HOM; 12	4th	5032
2016	Martin Truex Jr.	78	Toyota	DAY; 2	ATL; 7	LVS; 11	PHO; 14	CAL; 32	MAR; 18	TEX; 6*	BRI; 14	RCH; 9	TAL; 13	KAN; 14*	DOV; 9	CLT; 1*	POC; 19	MCH; 12	SON; 5	DAY; 29	KEN; 10	NHA; 16	IND; 8	POC; 38	GLN; 7	BRI; 23	MCH; 20	DAR; 1	RCH; 3*	CHI; 1	NHA; 7*	DOV; 1*	CLT; 13	KAN; 11	TAL; 40	MAR; 7	TEX; 3	PHO; 40	HOM; 36	11th	2271
2017	Martin Truex Jr.	78	Toyota	DAY; 13	ATL; 8	LVS; 1*	PHO; 11	CAL; 4	MAR; 16	TEX; 8	BRI; 8	RCH; 10	TAL; 35	KAN; 1*	CLT; 3*	DOV; 3	POC; 6	MCH; 6	SON; 37*	DAY; 34	KEN; 1*	NHA; 3*	IND; 33	POC; 3	GLN; 1*	MCH; 2	BRI; 21	DAR; 8	RCH; 20*	CHI; 1	NHA; 5	DOV; 4	CLT; 1	TAL; 23	KAN; 1	MAR; 2	TEX; 2*	PHO; 3	HOM; 1	1st	5040
2018	Martin Truex Jr.	78	Toyota	DAY; 18	ATL; 5	LVS; 4	PHO; 5	CAL; 1*	MAR; 4	TEX; 37	BRI; 30	RCH; 14*	TAL; 26	DOV; 4	KAN; 2	CLT; 2	POC; 1	MCH; 18	SON; 1*	CHI; 4	DAY; 2	KEN; 1*	NHA; 4	POC; 15	GLN; 2	MCH; 14	BRI; 30	DAR; 11	IND; 40	LVS; 3*	RCH; 3*	CLT; 14	DOV; 15	TAL; 23	KAN; 5	MAR; 3	TEX; 9	PHO; 14	HOM; 2	2nd	5035

== Wins ==
=== NASCAR Cup Series ===
No.	Year	Event	Track	Driver
1	2011	Showtime Southern 500	Darlington Raceway	Regan Smith
2	2015	Axalta "We Paint Winners" 400	Pocono Raceway	Martin Truex Jr.
3	2016	Coca-Cola 600	Charlotte Motor Speedway	Martin Truex Jr.
4	2016	Bojangles' Southern 500	Darlington Raceway	Martin Truex Jr.
5	2016	Teenage Mutant Ninja Turtles 400	Chicagoland Speedway	Martin Truex Jr.
6	2016	Citizen Soldier 400	Dover International Speedway	Martin Truex Jr.
7	2017	Kobalt 400	Las Vegas Motor Speedway	Martin Truex Jr.
8	2017	Go Bowling 400	Kansas Speedway	Martin Truex Jr.
9	2017	Quaker State 400	Kentucky Speedway	Martin Truex Jr.
10	2017	I Love NY 355	Watkins Glen International	Martin Truex Jr.
11	2017	Tales of the Turtles 400	Chicagoland Speedway	Martin Truex Jr.
12	2017	Bank of America 500	Charlotte Motor Speedway	Martin Truex Jr.
13	2017	Hollywood Casino 400	Kansas Speedway	Martin Truex Jr.
14	2017	Ford EcoBoost 400	Homestead–Miami Speedway	Martin Truex Jr.
15	2018	Auto Club 400	Auto Club Speedway	Martin Truex Jr.
16	2018	Pocono 400	Pocono Raceway	Martin Truex Jr.
17	2018	Toyota/Save Mart 350	Sonoma Raceway	Martin Truex Jr.
18	2018	Quaker State 400	Kentucky Speedway	Martin Truex Jr.
