= 2017 Kobalt 400 =

Race details
- Race 3 of 36 in the 2017 Monster Energy NASCAR Cup Series
- Date: March 12, 2017
- Location: Las Vegas Motor Speedway in Las Vegas
- Course: Permanent racing facility
- Course length: 1.5 miles (2.4 km)
- Distance: 267 laps, 400.5 mi (640.8 km)
- Average speed: 136.032 miles per hour (218.922 km/h)

Pole position
Driver	Brad Keselowski	Team Penske
- Time: 27.881

Most laps led
Driver	Martin Truex Jr.	Furniture Row Racing
- Laps: 150

Winner
No. 78	Martin Truex Jr.	Furniture Row Racing

Television in the United States
- Network: Fox
- Announcers: Mike Joy, Jeff Gordon and Darrell Waltrip

Radio in the United States
- Radio: PRN
- Booth announcers: Doug Rice, Mark Garrow and Wendy Venturini
- Turn announcers: Rob Albright (1 & 2) and Pat Patterson (3 & 4)

The 2017 Kobalt 400 was a Monster Energy NASCAR Cup Series race that was held on March 12, 2017, at Las Vegas Motor Speedway in Las Vegas. Contested over 267 laps on the 1.5 mi (2.4 km) asphalt intermediate speedway, it was the third race of the 2017 Monster Energy NASCAR Cup Series season.

== Entry list ==
No.	Driver	Team	Manufacturer
1	Jamie McMurray	Chip Ganassi Racing	Chevrolet
2	Brad Keselowski	Team Penske	Ford
3	Austin Dillon	Richard Childress Racing	Chevrolet
4	Kevin Harvick	Stewart–Haas Racing	Ford
5	Kasey Kahne	Hendrick Motorsports	Chevrolet
6	Trevor Bayne	Roush Fenway Racing	Ford
10	Danica Patrick	Stewart–Haas Racing	Ford
11	Denny Hamlin	Joe Gibbs Racing	Toyota
13	Ty Dillon (R)	Germain Racing	Chevrolet
14	Clint Bowyer	Stewart–Haas Racing	Ford
15	Reed Sorenson	Premium Motorsports	Toyota
17	Ricky Stenhouse Jr.	Roush Fenway Racing	Ford
18	Kyle Busch	Joe Gibbs Racing	Toyota
19	Daniel Suárez (R)	Joe Gibbs Racing	Toyota
20	Matt Kenseth	Joe Gibbs Racing	Toyota
21	Ryan Blaney	Wood Brothers Racing	Ford
22	Joey Logano	Team Penske	Ford
23	Gray Gaulding (R)	BK Racing	Toyota
24	Chase Elliott	Hendrick Motorsports	Chevrolet
27	Paul Menard	Richard Childress Racing	Chevrolet
31	Ryan Newman	Richard Childress Racing	Chevrolet
32	Matt DiBenedetto	Go Fas Racing	Ford
33	Jeffrey Earnhardt	Circle Sport – The Motorsports Group	Chevrolet
34	Landon Cassill	Front Row Motorsports	Ford
37	Chris Buescher	JTG Daugherty Racing	Chevrolet
38	David Ragan	Front Row Motorsports	Ford
41	Kurt Busch	Stewart–Haas Racing	Ford
42	Kyle Larson	Chip Ganassi Racing	Chevrolet
43	Aric Almirola	Richard Petty Motorsports	Ford
47	A. J. Allmendinger	JTG Daugherty Racing	Chevrolet
48	Jimmie Johnson	Hendrick Motorsports	Chevrolet
51	Timmy Hill (i)	Rick Ware Racing	Chevrolet
55	Derrike Cope	Premium Motorsports	Chevrolet
72	Cole Whitt	Tri-Star Motorsports	Chevrolet
77	Erik Jones (R)	Furniture Row Racing	Toyota
78	Martin Truex Jr.	Furniture Row Racing	Toyota
83	Corey LaJoie (R)	BK Racing	Toyota
88	Dale Earnhardt Jr.	Hendrick Motorsports	Chevrolet
95	Michael McDowell	Leavine Family Racing	Chevrolet
Official entry list

== Practice ==
=== First practice ===
Martin Truex Jr. was the fastest in the first practice session with a time of 27.907 seconds and a speed of 193.500 mph (311.408 km/h).

Pos	No.	Driver	Team	Manufacturer	Time	Speed
1	78	Martin Truex Jr.	Furniture Row Racing	Toyota	27.907	193.500
2	2	Brad Keselowski	Team Penske	Ford	27.980	192.995
3	48	Jimmie Johnson	Hendrick Motorsports	Chevrolet	27.981	192.988
Official first practice results

=== Second practice ===
Chase Elliott was the fastest in the second practice session with a time of 28.197 seconds and a speed of 191.510 mph (308.205 km/h).

Pos	No.	Driver	Team	Manufacturer	Time	Speed
1	24	Chase Elliott	Hendrick Motorsports	Chevrolet	28.197	191.510
2	42	Kyle Larson	Chip Ganassi Racing	Chevrolet	28.599	188.818
3	20	Matt Kenseth	Joe Gibbs Racing	Toyota	28.633	188.594
Official second practice results

=== Final practice ===
Martin Truex Jr. was the fastest in the final practice session with a time of 28.630 seconds and a speed of 188.613 mph (303.543 km/h).

Pos	No.	Driver	Team	Manufacturer	Time	Speed
1	78	Martin Truex Jr.	Furniture Row Racing	Toyota	28.630	188.613
2	24	Chase Elliott	Hendrick Motorsports	Chevrolet	28.636	188.574
3	88	Dale Earnhardt Jr.	Hendrick Motorsports	Chevrolet	28.657	188.436
Official final practice results

== Qualifying ==
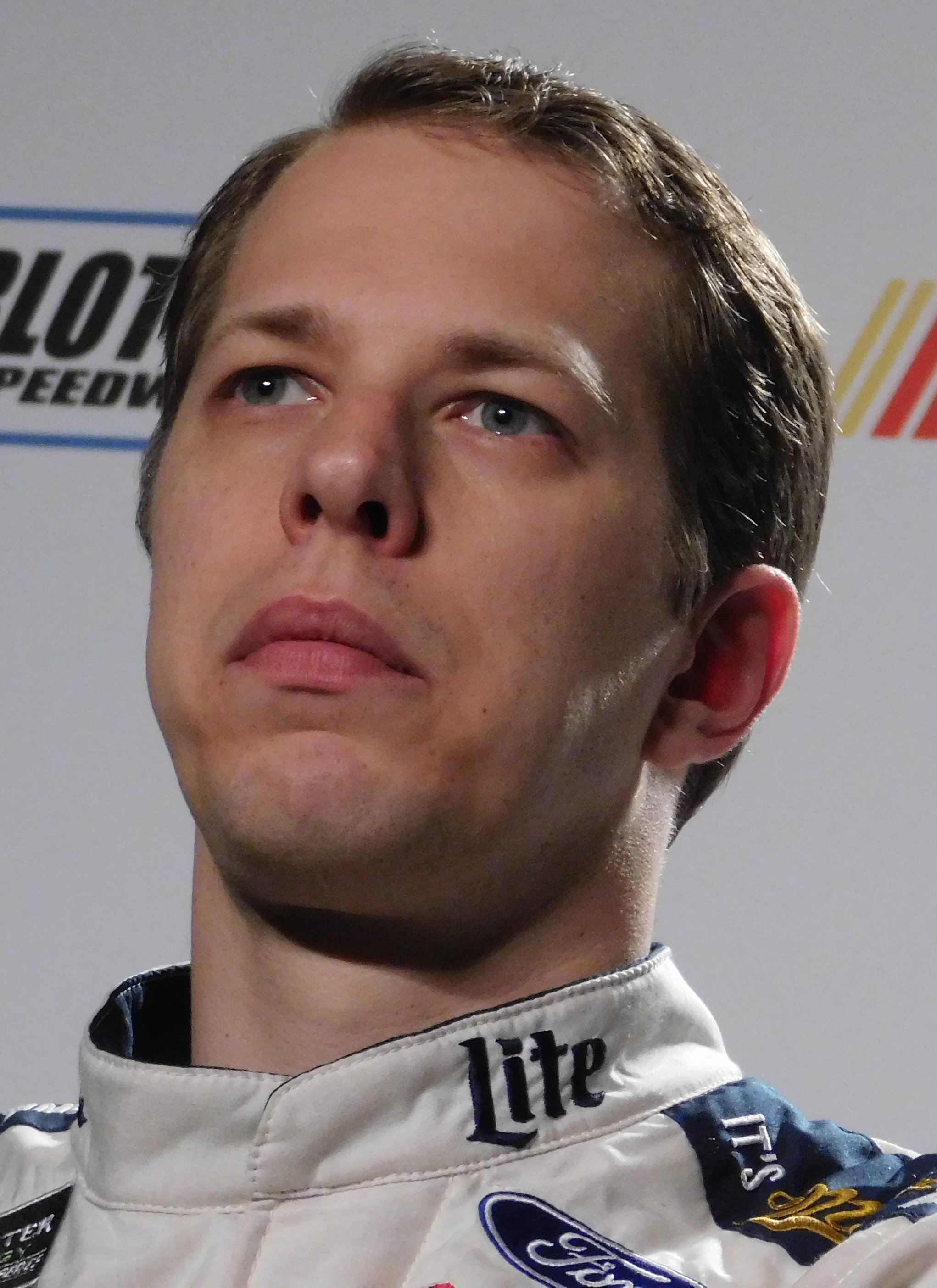
Brad Keselowski scored the pole position.

Brad Keselowski scored the pole for the race with a time of 27.881 and a speed of 193.680 mph (311.698 km/h). When asked how he accomplished this despite missing his mark in Turns 1 and 2 on his pole lap, he said he didn't "know what the answer is. I'll have to look through a bunch of data, and the smart guys -- the engineers and crew chiefs -- will probably point some of that stuff out to me. But, yeah, every time I looked at the tracker, the cars that were fast in 1 and 2 weren't in 3 and 4, and we were the opposite. We were really good in 3 and 4... but we'll take it either way."

=== Qualifying results ===
Pos	No.	Driver	Team	Manufacturer	R1	R2	R3
1	2	Brad Keselowski	Team Penske	Ford	27.923	27.961	27.881
2	78	Martin Truex Jr.	Furniture Row Racing	Toyota	28.000	27.921	27.913
3	21	Ryan Blaney	Wood Brothers Racing	Ford	28.084	27.814	27.920
4	20	Matt Kenseth	Joe Gibbs Racing	Toyota	28.039	27.883	27.923
5	42	Kyle Larson	Chip Ganassi Racing	Chevrolet	28.018	27.907	27.956
6	22	Joey Logano	Team Penske	Ford	27.975	28.033	27.959
7	5	Kasey Kahne	Hendrick Motorsports	Chevrolet	28.120	27.924	27.960
8	77	Erik Jones (R)	Furniture Row Racing	Toyota	27.934	28.032	28.071
9	18	Kyle Busch	Joe Gibbs Racing	Toyota	27.831	27.982	28.072
10	1	Jamie McMurray	Chip Ganassi Racing	Chevrolet	28.123	28.032	28.072
11	19	Daniel Suárez (R)	Joe Gibbs Racing	Toyota	27.963	28.033	28.130
12	24	Chase Elliott	Hendrick Motorsports	Chevrolet	28.007	27.890	28.266
13	14	Clint Bowyer	Stewart–Haas Racing	Ford	28.268	28.034	—
14	27	Paul Menard	Richard Childress Racing	Chevrolet	28.288	28.062	—
15	11	Denny Hamlin	Joe Gibbs Racing	Toyota	28.078	28.073	—
16	48	Jimmie Johnson	Hendrick Motorsports	Chevrolet	27.963	28.086	—
17	41	Kurt Busch	Stewart–Haas Racing	Ford	28.043	28.112	—
18	88	Dale Earnhardt Jr.	Hendrick Motorsports	Chevrolet	28.001	28.115	—
19	4	Kevin Harvick	Stewart–Haas Racing	Ford	28.052	28.169	—
20	6	Trevor Bayne	Roush Fenway Racing	Ford	28.192	28.178	—
21	31	Ryan Newman	Richard Childress Racing	Chevrolet	28.180	28.195	—
22	3	Austin Dillon	Richard Childress Racing	Chevrolet	28.155	28.268	—
23	47	A. J. Allmendinger	JTG Daugherty Racing	Chevrolet	28.316	28.326	—
24	13	Ty Dillon (R)	Germain Racing	Chevrolet	28.306	28.592	—
25	37	Chris Buescher	JTG Daugherty Racing	Chevrolet	28.336	—	—
26	95	Michael McDowell	Leavine Family Racing	Chevrolet	28.361	—	—
27	34	Landon Cassill	Front Row Motorsports	Ford	28.390	—	—
28	10	Danica Patrick	Stewart–Haas Racing	Ford	28.428	—	—
29	17	Ricky Stenhouse Jr.	Roush Fenway Racing	Ford	28.488	—	—
30	43	Aric Almirola	Richard Petty Motorsports	Ford	28.511	—	—
31	32	Matt DiBenedetto	Go Fas Racing	Ford	28.752	—	—
32	38	David Ragan	Front Row Motorsports	Ford	28.921	—	—
33	72	Cole Whitt	TriStar Motorsports	Chevrolet	29.071	—	—
34	83	Corey LaJoie (R)	BK Racing	Toyota	29.102	—	—
35	23	Gray Gaulding (R)	BK Racing	Toyota	29.188	—	—
36	33	Jeffrey Earnhardt	Circle Sport – The Motorsports Group	Chevrolet	29.569	—	—
37	15	Reed Sorenson	Premium Motorsports	Toyota	29.950	—	—
38	55	Derrike Cope	Premium Motorsports	Chevrolet	30.428	—	—
39	51	Timmy Hill (i)	Rick Ware Racing	Chevrolet	30.879	—	—
Official qualifying results

== Race ==
=== Stage 1 ===
Brad Keselowski led the field to the green flag at 3:48 p.m. He pulled away from Martin Truex Jr. in the opening laps, but Truex started reeling him back in around lap 12. The first caution of the race flew on lap 18 when Corey LaJoie slammed the wall in Turn 2. He went on to finish last. Truex exited pit road with the race lead.

The race restarted on lap 25. Keselowski, restarting on the outside lane, powered by Truex on the backstretch to take back the lead on the restart. Exiting the tri-oval, Kevin Harvick suffered a right-front tire blowout and slammed the wall, bringing out the second caution on lap 68. After leaving the infield care center, he said that the tire "started vibrating about four or five laps there before it blew out, and I was just trying to ride it to the end of the stage there. Obviously, it didn’t make it.” Joey Logano opted not to pit and took the lead.

The race restarted on lap 75. Truex, on four new tires, passed Logano with ease on the backstretch to retake the lead. He won the first stage and the third caution flew for the conclusion of the stage. Truex decided to stay out, having pitted under the previous caution.

=== Stage 2 ===
The race restarted on lap 88. It settled into a green run that was interrupted by a cycle of green flag stops beginning on lap 125. Truex pitted from the lead the following lap. Keselowski pitted from the lead the next lap. Ty Dillon pitted from the lead on lap 129 and handed the lead to Michael McDowell. Truex passed McDowell in Turn 1 to cycle back to the lead on lap 131. Kyle Busch was handed a pass through penalty for speeding on pit road.

The fourth caution flew on lap 152 when Derrike Cope spun out in Turn 2. Jimmie Johnson inherited the lead after electing not to pit.

The race restarted on lap 156. Truex, on four new tires, passed Johnson with ease exiting Turn 2 on the restart to retake the lead. He won the second stage and the fifth caution flew for the conclusion of the stage.

=== Final stage ===
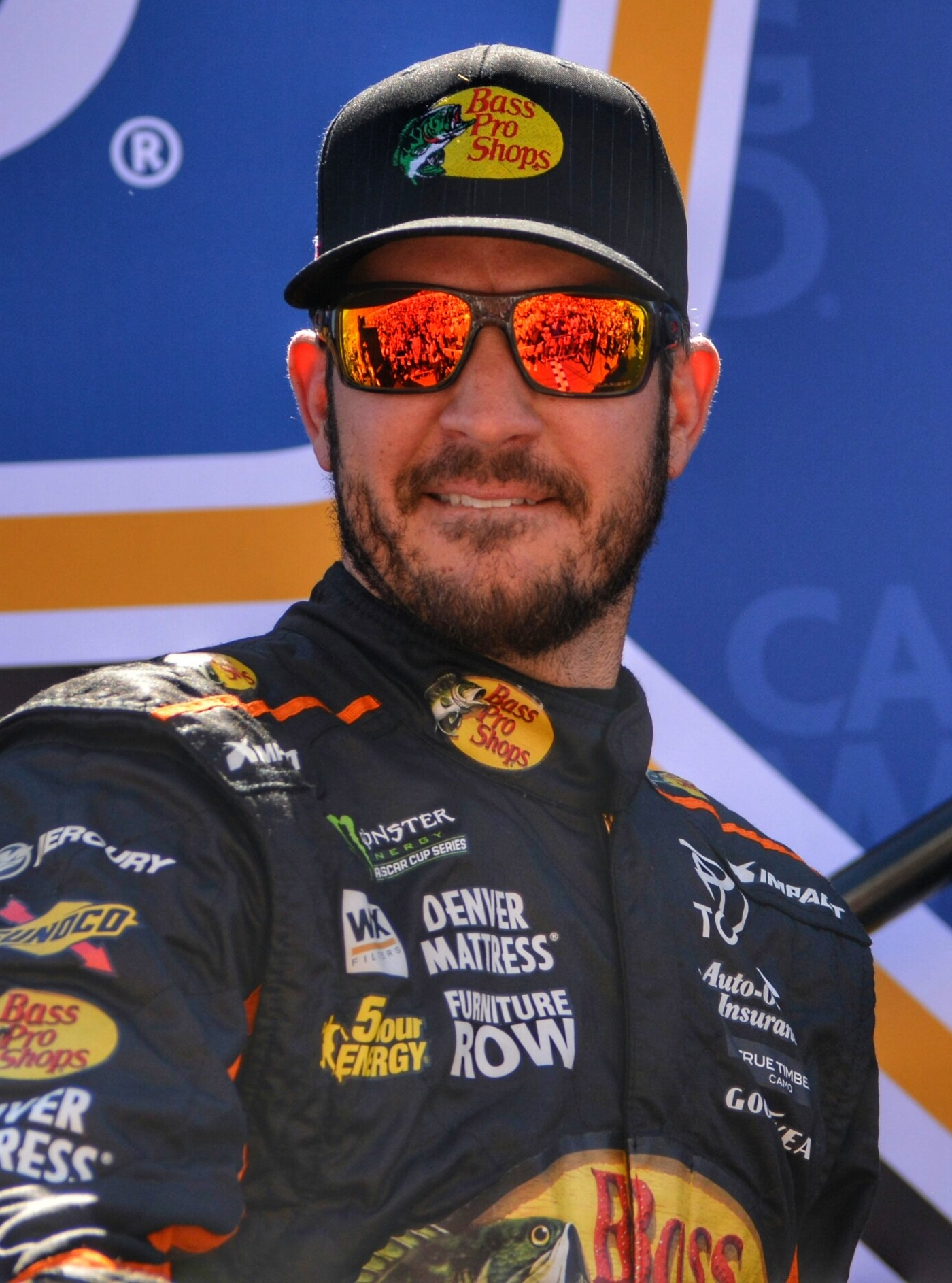
Martin Truex Jr. swept all three stages and won the race.

The race restarted with 100 laps to go. Kurt Busch made an unscheduled stop with 66 to go to make a battery change. Truex pitted with 57 to go and Johnson took the lead. He stayed out for 17 laps hoping for a caution, but didn't get one, pitted with 40 to go and Truex regained the lead. Keselowski passed Chase Elliott for second with 34 to go and set his sights on Truex. He passed Truex in Turn 3 to retake the lead with 23 to go. The sixth caution flew with 16 to go when Danica Patrick's engine expired on the frontstretch. She said her team "got the car to a place where I [thought] we could have got a little more racy with it, especially if we would have caught some breaks, but then it just flattened out. I just rode around the top in case I blew up, but having a teammate behind me was not ideal for the timing of it, but unfortunately it happened. We'll just move on.” The leaders all pitted under the caution and Keselowski remained the leader.

The race restarted with nine to go. Keselowski pulled away on the restart and had the win in check, but suffered a part failure with two to go and dropped off pace. Truex passed him on the backstretch and scored the victory.

== Post-race ==
=== Final lap and brawl ===
On the final lap, Keselowski's car fell back through the field. Kyle Busch veered to the bottom to avoid him and made contact with Logano. In Turn 3, Logano got loose, hit Busch and sent him spinning through Turn 4 and down onto pit road. Busch got out of his car, proceeded to the staging area where the top-five cars are captured after the race, usually at the entrance of pit road, threw a punch at Logano and a brawl broke out on pit road. It lasted roughly 18 seconds before officials broke it up.

Logano said after everything settled down that there wasn't much talking as "swinging", and that he was just "racing hard there at the end with our Pennzoil Ford. Kyle and I usually race really well together. We usually never have any issues, and he tried to pin me down into the corner underneath Brad and we about crashed on entry, and then I was still trying to gather it up by the center and I was gonna spin out, so I’m trying to chase it up and he was there. It obviously wasn’t anything intentional, but obviously he thinks that, so, I don’t know, we’ll get by.”

Busch saw it differently, telling Vince Welch of Fox Sports that he "got dumped. (Logano) flat-out just drove straight in the corner and wrecked me. That's how Joey races, so he's going to get it."

=== Driver comments ===
Truex said in victory lane that his team "definitely had [their] share of races where we've dominated and gave one away, and it looked like today was going to be another one of those. The runs just didn't work out the way we needed them. We were struggling on the really long runs. We had to run that last set of tires on that last caution longer than we did all race long. From Lap 211 until caution for Danica Patrick's blown engine on Lap 252, I was out of control and Brad was really good on the long run. I hate that he had problems. He was strong and we weren't going to do anything with him, but then he lost the brakes or something. A little bit of a gift, but we've given some away, so it feels good to come out on the good end for once."

Keselowski, who finished fifth, said his team will "have to take [the car] apart (to discover the source of the part failure), it has to go through inspection. I just know it was something major. It wouldn't turn, and I lost the brakes, so it's a pretty good indicator.”

== Race results ==
=== Stage results ===
Stage 1 Laps: 80

Pos	No	Driver	Team	Manufacturer	Points
1	78	Martin Truex Jr.	Furniture Row Racing	Toyota	10
2	42	Kyle Larson	Chip Ganassi Racing	Chevrolet	9
3	21	Ryan Blaney	Wood Brothers Racing	Ford	8
4	2	Brad Keselowski	Team Penske	Ford	7
5	24	Chase Elliott	Hendrick Motorsports	Chevrolet	6
6	1	Jamie McMurray	Chip Ganassi Racing	Chevrolet	5
7	48	Jimmie Johnson	Hendrick Motorsports	Chevrolet	4
8	18	Kyle Busch	Joe Gibbs Racing	Toyota	3
9	20	Matt Kenseth	Joe Gibbs Racing	Toyota	2
10	88	Dale Earnhardt Jr.	Hendrick Motorsports	Chevrolet	1
Official stage one results

Stage 2 Laps: 80

Pos	No	Driver	Team	Manufacturer	Points
1	78	Martin Truex Jr.	Furniture Row Racing	Toyota	10
2	2	Brad Keselowski	Team Penske	Ford	9
3	42	Kyle Larson	Chip Ganassi Racing	Chevrolet	8
4	24	Chase Elliott	Hendrick Motorsports	Chevrolet	7
5	22	Joey Logano	Team Penske	Ford	6
6	21	Ryan Blaney	Wood Brothers Racing	Ford	5
7	88	Dale Earnhardt Jr.	Hendrick Motorsports	Chevrolet	4
8	1	Jamie McMurray	Chip Ganassi Racing	Chevrolet	3
9	31	Ryan Newman	Richard Childress Racing	Chevrolet	2
10	48	Jimmie Johnson	Hendrick Motorsports	Chevrolet	1
Official stage two results

=== Final stage results ===
Stage 3 Laps: 107

Pos	No	Driver	Team	Manufacturer	Laps	Points
1	78	Martin Truex Jr.	Furniture Row Racing	Toyota	267	60
2	42	Kyle Larson	Chip Ganassi Racing	Chevrolet	267	52
3	24	Chase Elliott	Hendrick Motorsports	Chevrolet	267	47
4	22	Joey Logano	Team Penske	Ford	267	39
5	2	Brad Keselowski	Team Penske	Ford	267	48
6	11	Denny Hamlin	Joe Gibbs Racing	Toyota	267	31
7	21	Ryan Blaney	Wood Brothers Racing	Ford	267	43
8	1	Jamie McMurray	Chip Ganassi Racing	Chevrolet	267	37
9	20	Matt Kenseth	Joe Gibbs Racing	Toyota	267	30
10	14	Clint Bowyer	Stewart–Haas Racing	Ford	267	27
11	48	Jimmie Johnson	Hendrick Motorsports	Chevrolet	267	31
12	5	Kasey Kahne	Hendrick Motorsports	Chevrolet	267	25
13	6	Trevor Bayne	Roush Fenway Racing	Ford	267	24
14	43	Aric Almirola	Richard Petty Motorsports	Ford	267	23
15	77	Erik Jones (R)	Furniture Row Racing	Toyota	267	22
16	88	Dale Earnhardt Jr.	Hendrick Motorsports	Chevrolet	267	26
17	31	Ryan Newman	Richard Childress Racing	Chevrolet	267	22
18	95	Michael McDowell	Leavine Family Racing	Chevrolet	267	19
19	27	Paul Menard	Richard Childress Racing	Chevrolet	267	18
20	19	Daniel Suárez (R)	Joe Gibbs Racing	Toyota	267	17
21	13	Ty Dillon (R)	Germain Racing	Chevrolet	267	16
22	18	Kyle Busch	Joe Gibbs Racing	Toyota	267	18
23	37	Chris Buescher	JTG Daugherty Racing	Chevrolet	266	14
24	47	A. J. Allmendinger	JTG Daugherty Racing	Chevrolet	266	13
25	3	Austin Dillon	Richard Childress Racing	Chevrolet	265	12
26	32	Matt DiBenedetto	Fas Lane Racing	Ford	265	11
27	34	Landon Cassill	Front Row Motorsports	Ford	264	10
28	72	Cole Whitt	TriStar Motorsports	Chevrolet	264	9
29	38	David Ragan	Front Row Motorsports	Ford	264	8
30	41	Kurt Busch	Stewart–Haas Racing	Ford	263	7
31	15	Reed Sorenson	Premium Motorsports	Toyota	262	6
32	33	Jeffrey Earnhardt	Circle Sport – The Motorsports Group	Chevrolet	261	5
33	17	Ricky Stenhouse Jr.	Roush Fenway Racing	Ford	261	4
34	23	Gray Gaulding (R)	BK Racing	Toyota	260	3
35	55	Derrike Cope	Premium Motorsports	Chevrolet	254	2
36	10	Danica Patrick	Stewart–Haas Racing	Ford	246	1
37	51	Timmy Hill (i)	Rick Ware Racing	Chevrolet	135	0
38	4	Kevin Harvick	Stewart–Haas Racing	Ford	68	1
39	83	Corey LaJoie (R)	BK Racing	Toyota	16	1
Official race results

=== Race statistics ===
- Lead changes: 6 among different drivers
- Cautions/Laps: 6 for 34
- Red flags: 0
- Time of race: 2 hours, 56 minutes and 39 seconds
- Average speed: 136.032 miles per hour (218.922 km/h)

== Media ==
=== Television ===
Fox Sports covered their 17th race at the Las Vegas Motor Speedway. Mike Joy, 2001 race winner Jeff Gordon and Darrell Waltrip had the call in the booth for the race. Jamie Little, Vince Welch and Matt Yocum handled the pit road duties for the television side.

Fox
Booth announcers	Pit reporters
Lap-by-lap: Mike Joy; Color-commentator: Jeff Gordon; Color commentator: Darrell Waltrip	Jamie Little; Vince Welch; Matt Yocum

=== Radio ===
PRN had the radio call for the race which was also simulcasted on Sirius XM NASCAR Radio. Doug Rice, Mark Garrow and Wendy Venturini called the race in the booth when the field raced through the tri-oval. Rob Albright called the race from a billboard in turn 2 when the field raced through turns 1 and 2. Pat Patterson called the race from a billboard outside of turn 3 when the field raced through turns 3 and 4. Brad Gillie, Brett McMillan, Jim Noble and Steve Richards worked pit road for the radio side.

PRN
Booth announcers	Turn announcers	Pit reporters
Lead announcer: Doug Rice; Announcer: Mark Garrow; Announcer: Wendy Venturini	Turns 1 & 2: Rob Albright; Turns 3 & 4: Pat Patterson	Brad Gillie; Brett McMillan; Jim Noble; Steve Richards

== Standings after the race ==
Drivers' Championship standings

	Pos	Driver	Points
2	1	Brad Keselowski	132
4	2	Kyle Larson	131 (–1)
1	3	Chase Elliott	129 (–3)
3	4	Martin Truex Jr.	127 (–5)
	5	Joey Logano	119 (–13)
2	6	Ryan Blaney	106 (–26)
5	7	Kurt Busch	93 (–39)
7	8	Kevin Harvick	91 (–41)
	9	Kasey Kahne	88 (–44)
2	10	Jamie McMurray	86 (–46)
1	11	Trevor Bayne	82 (–50)
2	12	Clint Bowyer	73 (–59)
3	13	Matt Kenseth	71 (–61)
1	14	Aric Almirola	70 (–62)
4	15	Denny Hamlin	68 (–64)
1	16	Paul Menard	62 (–70)
Official driver's standings

Manufacturers' Championship standings

Pos	Manufacturer	Points
1	Ford	113
2	Chevrolet	104 (–9)
3	Toyota	103 (–10)
Official manufacturers' standings

- Note: Only the first 16 positions are included for the driver standings.

Previous race: 2017 Folds of Honor QuikTrip 500	Monster Energy NASCAR Cup Series; 2017 season	Next race: 2017 Camping World 500
