= Jerry Robertson (racing driver) =

American racing driver (born 1962)

- Born: Gerald Robertson; January 27, 1962 (age 64); Denver, Colorado, U.S.

NASCAR Cup Series career
- 1 race run over 1 year
- Best finish: 83rd (2005)
- First race: 2005 Checker Auto Parts 500 (Phoenix)
Wins	Top tens	Poles
0	0	0

NASCAR O'Reilly Auto Parts Series career
- 24 races run over 5 years
- Best finish: 62nd (2005)
- First race: 1997 Las Vegas 300 (Las Vegas)
- Last race: 2006 Arizona.Travel 200 (Phoenix)
Wins	Top tens	Poles
0	0	0

NASCAR FedEx Freight Truck Series career
- 8 races run over 5 years
- Best finish: 59th (1999)
- First race: 1996 Colorado 250 (Colorado)
- Last race: 2001 Jelly Belly 200 (Pikes Peak)
Wins	Top tens	Poles
0	0	0
- Statistics up to date as of July 27, 2020.

Jerry Robertson (born January 27, 1962) is an American former professional stock car racing driver. He competed part-time in NASCAR from 1996 to 2006 (as well as one ARCA race in 1987). He primarily drove for underfunded teams in the Cup, O'Reilly and Truck Series as well as in NASCAR's Southwest and Midwest Series, winning twice in the Southwest Series. He is notable for being the first ever driver for Furniture Row Racing, a team based out of Denver (also where Robertson is from) that would go on to win multiple races in the NASCAR Cup Series and the 2017 NASCAR Cup Series championship after starting out as an underfunded team in the series.

== Racing career ==
=== Early career ===
Robertson began his racing career as a high school senior at Colorado National Speedway and won eight races, garnering the Rookie of the Year title. Over the next twelve years, he was a fixture on the national dirt-track racing scene, winning 126 times. In 1994, he switched to paved racing, and was named Rookie of the Year and champion in the NASCAR Grand American Modified Division. After being named "Oval Track Driver of the Year", he ran in the NASCAR Northwest Regional Championship Series, winning titles in 2003 and 2004.

=== NASCAR ===
Robertson ran eight races in the Craftsman Truck Series between 1996 and 2001.

In 2005, Robertson joined the upstart Furniture Row Racing team and ran ten races in their No. 78 car. His best race finish came that year when he finished 22nd in the Ameriquest 300 at Auto Club Speedway. He also made his Nextel Cup Series debut that year for Furniture Row at Phoenix, finishing 41st after suffering an engine failure. Robertson was expected to run more Cup races for Furniture Row in 2006. However, without a guarantee of qualifying for races, the inexperienced Robertson was scaled back to run mostly Busch Series races for the team, which were his last NASCAR starts, while Cup Series veteran driver Kenny Wallace drove the team's Cup car.

Although Robertson did not find a NASCAR ride for the 2007 and 2008 seasons, he continued to race locally.

== Motorsports career results ==
=== NASCAR ===
(key) (Bold – Pole position awarded by qualifying time. Italics – Pole position earned by points standings or practice time. * – Most laps led.)

==== Nextel Cup Series ====
NASCAR Nextel Cup Series results
Year	Team	No.	Make	1	2	3	4	5	6	7	8	9	10	11	12	13	14	15	16	17	18	19	20	21	22	23	24	25	26	27	28	29	30	31	32	33	34	35	36	NNCC	Pts	Ref
2002	Ware Racing Enterprises	51	Dodge	DAY	CAR	LVS	ATL	DAR	BRI	TEX	MAR	TAL	CAL	RCH	CLT	DOV	POC	MCH	SON	DAY	CHI	NHA	POC	IND	GLN	MCH	BRI	DAR	RCH	NHA	DOV	KAN	TAL	CLT	MAR	ATL	CAR	PHO; DNQ	HOM	N/A	0	
2005	Furniture Row Racing	78	Chevy	DAY	CAL	LVS	ATL	BRI	MAR	TEX	PHO	TAL	DAR	RCH	CLT	DOV	POC	MCH	SON	DAY	CHI	NHA	POC	IND	GLN	MCH	BRI	CAL	RCH	NHA	DOV	TAL	KAN	CLT	MAR	ATL	TEX	PHO; 41	HOM	83rd	40	

==== Busch Series ====
NASCAR Busch Series results
Year	Team	No.	Make	1	2	3	4	5	6	7	8	9	10	11	12	13	14	15	16	17	18	19	20	21	22	23	24	25	26	27	28	29	30	31	32	33	34	35	NBSC	Pts	Ref
1997	Taylor Motorsports	40	Ford	DAY	CAR	RCH	ATL	LVS; 22	DAR	HCY; 29	TEX; 31	BRI	NSV	TAL; DNQ	NHA	NZH	CLT	DOV	SBO	GLN	MLW	MYB	GTY	IRP	MCH	BRI	DAR	RCH	DOV	CLT	CAL	CAR	HOM						74th	243	
2001	PRW Racing	77	Ford	DAY	CAR	LVS	ATL	DAR	BRI	TEX	NSH	TAL	CAL	RCH	NHA	NZH	CLT	DOV	KEN	MLW	GLN	CHI	GTY	PPR; 27	IRP	MCH	BRI	DAR	RCH	DOV	KAN	CLT	MEM	PHO	CAR	HOM			111th	82	
2003	PF2 Motorsports	94	Ford	DAY	CAR	LVS	DAR	BRI	TEX	TAL	NSH	CAL	RCH	GTY	NZH	CLT	DOV	NSH	KEN	MLW	DAY	CHI	NHA	PPR; 41	IRP	MCH	BRI	DAR	RCH	DOV	KAN	CLT	MEM	ATL	PHO	CAR	HOM		156th		
2005	Furniture Row Racing	78	Chevy	DAY	CAL	MXC	LVS; DNQ	ATL	NSH; 33	BRI	TEX; 25	PHO; 23	TAL	DAR	RCH; 40	CLT	DOV	NSH; 37	KEN; DNQ	MLW	DAY	CHI; 34	NHA	PPR; 29	GTY	IRP	GLN	MCH; DNQ	BRI	CAL; 22	RCH; DNQ	DOV	KAN; 39	CLT	MEM	TEX; 35	PHO	HOM; DNQ	62nd	603	
2006	MacDonald Motorsports	72	Chevy	DAY	CAL	MXC	LVS	ATL	BRI; DNQ	TEX	NSH																												66th	477	
2006	Furniture Row Racing	78	Chevy									PHO; 40	TAL	RCH; 29	DAR	CLT	DOV	NSH; DNQ	KEN	MLW	DAY	CHI; 36	NHA	MAR; 32	GTY	IRP	GLN	MCH; DNQ	BRI	CAL; 39	RCH; 29	DOV	KAN; 42	CLT	MEM; 42	TEX; DNQ	PHO; 41	HOM	66th	477	

==== Craftsman Truck Series ====
NASCAR Craftsman Truck Series results
Year	Team	No.	Make	1	2	3	4	5	6	7	8	9	10	11	12	13	14	15	16	17	18	19	20	21	22	23	24	25	26	27	NCTC	Pts	Ref
1996	Rudy Proctor	5	Ford	HOM	PHO	POR	EVG	TUS	CNS; 20	HPT	BRI	NZH	MLW	LVL	I70	IRP	FLM	GLN	NSV	RCH	NHA	MAR	NWS	SON							85th	158	
1996	Gary Miller	34	Chevy																						MMR	PHO	LVS; 36				85th	158	
1997	MB Motorsports	26	Ford	WDW	TUS	HOM	PHO	POR	EVG	I70	NHA	TEX	BRI	NZH	MLW; 26	LVL	CNS; 30	HPT	IRP; DNQ	FLM	NSV	GLN	RCH	MAR; DNQ	SON	MMR	CAL	PHO			64th	291	
1997	Larry Carnes	36	Chevy																										LVS; DNQ		64th	291	
1998	Joe Ambrose	12	Chevy	WDW	HOM	PHO	POR	EVG	I70	GLN	TEX	BRI	MLW	NZH	CAL	PPR	IRP	NHA	FLM	NSV	HPT	LVL	RCH	MEM	GTY	MAR	SON	MMR	PHO	LVS; DNQ	N/A	0	
1999	MB Motorsports	26	Ford	HOM	PHO	EVG	MMR	MAR	MEM	PPR	I70	BRI	TEX; 25	PIR	GLN	MLW; 25	NSV; 33	NZH	MCH	NHA	IRP	GTY	HPT	RCH	LVS	LVL	TEX	CAL			59th	240	
2001	Ware Racing Enterprises	51	Chevy	DAY	HOM	MMR	MAR	GTY	DAR	PPR; 21	DOV	TEX	MEM	MLW	KAN	KEN	NHA	IRP	NSH	CIC	NZH	RCH	SBO	TEX	LVS	PHO	CAL				98th	100	

=== ARCA Permatex SuperCar Series ===
(key) (Bold – Pole position awarded by qualifying time. Italics – Pole position earned by points standings or practice time. * – Most laps led.)

ARCA Permatex SuperCar Series results
Year	Team	No.	Make	1	2	3	4	5	6	7	8	9	10	11	12	13	14	15	16	17	APSCSC	Pts	Ref
1987	Info not available	96	Pontiac	DAY	ATL	TAL	DEL	ACS	TOL	ROC	POC; 26	FRS	KIL	TAL	FRS	ISF	IND	DSF	SLM	ATL			
