= 2017 Toyota/Save Mart 350 =

Race details
- Race 16 of 36 in the 2017 Monster Energy NASCAR Cup Series
- Date: June 25, 2017
- Location: Sonoma Raceway in Sonoma, California
- Course: Permanent racing facility
- Course length: 1.99 miles (3.2 km)
- Distance: 110 laps, 218.9 mi (352 km)
- Average speed: 78.710 miles per hour (126.671 km/h)

Pole position
Driver	Kyle Larson	Chip Ganassi Racing
- Time: 75.177

Most laps led
Driver	Martin Truex Jr.	Furniture Row Racing
- Laps: 25

Winner
No. 4	Kevin Harvick	Stewart–Haas Racing

Television in the United States
- Network: FS1
- Announcers: Mike Joy, Jeff Gordon and Darrell Waltrip

Radio in the United States
- Radio: PRN
- Booth announcers: Doug Rice and Mark Garrow
- Turn announcers: Pat Patterson (2, 3 & 3a), Brad Gillie (4a & 7a) and Rob Albright (10 & 11)

The 2017 Toyota/Save Mart 350 was a Monster Energy NASCAR Cup Series race held on June 25, 2017, at Sonoma Raceway in Sonoma, California. Contested over 110 laps on the 1.99-mile (3.20 km) road course, it was the 16th race of the 2017 Monster Energy NASCAR Cup Series season.

== Entry list ==
No.	Driver	Team	Manufacturer
1	Jamie McMurray	Chip Ganassi Racing	Chevrolet
2	Brad Keselowski	Team Penske	Ford
3	Austin Dillon	Richard Childress Racing	Chevrolet
4	Kevin Harvick	Stewart–Haas Racing	Ford
5	Kasey Kahne	Hendrick Motorsports	Chevrolet
6	Trevor Bayne	Roush Fenway Racing	Ford
10	Danica Patrick	Stewart–Haas Racing	Ford
11	Denny Hamlin	Joe Gibbs Racing	Toyota
13	Ty Dillon (R)	Germain Racing	Chevrolet
14	Clint Bowyer	Stewart–Haas Racing	Ford
15	Kevin O'Connell	Premium Motorsports	Chevrolet
17	Ricky Stenhouse Jr.	Roush Fenway Racing	Ford
18	Kyle Busch	Joe Gibbs Racing	Toyota
19	Daniel Suárez (R)	Joe Gibbs Racing	Toyota
20	Matt Kenseth	Joe Gibbs Racing	Toyota
21	Ryan Blaney	Wood Brothers Racing	Ford
22	Joey Logano	Team Penske	Ford
23	Alon Day	BK Racing	Toyota
24	Chase Elliott	Hendrick Motorsports	Chevrolet
27	Paul Menard	Richard Childress Racing	Chevrolet
31	Ryan Newman	Richard Childress Racing	Chevrolet
32	Matt DiBenedetto	Go Fas Racing	Ford
33	Boris Said	Circle Sport – The Motorsports Group	Chevrolet
34	Landon Cassill	Front Row Motorsports	Ford
37	Chris Buescher	JTG Daugherty Racing	Chevrolet
38	David Ragan	Front Row Motorsports	Ford
41	Kurt Busch	Stewart–Haas Racing	Ford
42	Kyle Larson	Chip Ganassi Racing	Chevrolet
43	Billy Johnson	Richard Petty Motorsports	Ford
47	A. J. Allmendinger	JTG Daugherty Racing	Chevrolet
48	Jimmie Johnson	Hendrick Motorsports	Chevrolet
51	Josh Bilicki (i)	Rick Ware Racing	Chevrolet
55	Tommy Regan	Premium Motorsports	Chevrolet
72	Cole Whitt	TriStar Motorsports	Chevrolet
77	Erik Jones (R)	Furniture Row Racing	Toyota
78	Martin Truex Jr.	Furniture Row Racing	Toyota
88	Dale Earnhardt Jr.	Hendrick Motorsports	Chevrolet
95	Michael McDowell	Leavine Family Racing	Chevrolet
Official entry list

== Practice ==
=== First practice ===
Martin Truex Jr. was the fastest in the first practice session with a time of 75.740 seconds and a speed of 94.587 mph (152.223 km/h).

Pos	No.	Driver	Team	Manufacturer	Time	Speed
1	78	Martin Truex Jr.	Furniture Row Racing	Toyota	75.740	94.587
2	11	Denny Hamlin	Joe Gibbs Racing	Toyota	76.158	94.068
3	17	Ricky Stenhouse Jr.	Roush Fenway Racing	Ford	76.470	93.684
Official first practice results

=== Final practice ===
Kyle Larson was the fastest in the final practice session with a time of 75.899 seconds and a speed of 94.389 mph (151.904 km/h).

Pos	No.	Driver	Team	Manufacturer	Time	Speed
1	42	Kyle Larson	Chip Ganassi Racing	Chevrolet	75.899	94.389
2	18	Kyle Busch	Joe Gibbs Racing	Toyota	75.935	94.344
3	88	Dale Earnhardt Jr.	Hendrick Motorsports	Chevrolet	76.017	94.242
Official final practice results

== Qualifying ==
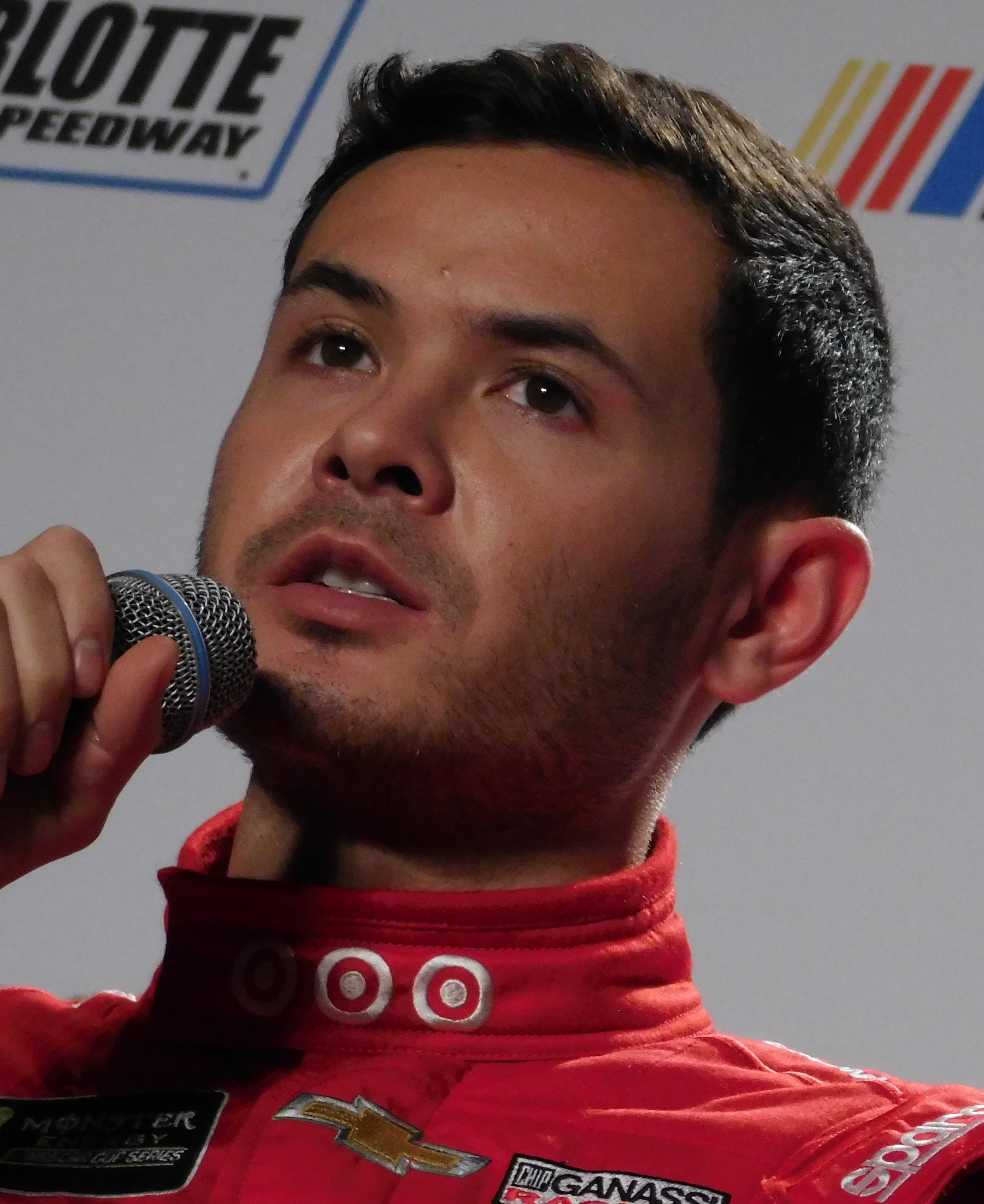
Kyle Larson scored the pole position.

Kyle Larson scored the pole for the race with a time of 75.177 and a speed of 95.295 mph (153.362 km/h).

=== Qualifying results ===
Pos	No.	Driver	Team	Manufacturer	R1	R2
1	42	Kyle Larson	Chip Ganassi Racing	Chevrolet	75.645	75.177
2	1	Jamie McMurray	Chip Ganassi Racing	Chevrolet	75.366	75.249
3	78	Martin Truex Jr.	Furniture Row Racing	Toyota	75.201	75.453
4	18	Kyle Busch	Joe Gibbs Racing	Toyota	75.229	75.459
5	47	A. J. Allmendinger	JTG Daugherty Racing	Chevrolet	75.587	75.553
6	10	Danica Patrick	Stewart–Haas Racing	Ford	75.515	75.591
7	21	Ryan Blaney	Wood Brothers Racing	Ford	75.646	75.637
8	24	Chase Elliott	Hendrick Motorsports	Chevrolet	75.117	75.781
9	37	Chris Buescher	JTG Daugherty Racing	Chevrolet	75.370	75.904
10	88	Dale Earnhardt Jr.	Hendrick Motorsports	Chevrolet	75.696	75.914
11	19	Daniel Suárez (R)	Joe Gibbs Racing	Toyota	75.686	75.961
12	4	Kevin Harvick	Stewart–Haas Racing	Ford	75.508	76.098
13	14	Clint Bowyer	Stewart–Haas Racing	Ford	75.698	—
14	11	Denny Hamlin	Joe Gibbs Racing	Toyota	75.946	—
15	27	Paul Menard	Richard Childress Racing	Chevrolet	76.000	—
16	95	Michael McDowell	Leavine Family Racing	Chevrolet	76.009	—
17	41	Kurt Busch	Stewart–Haas Racing	Ford	76.040	—
18	22	Joey Logano	Team Penske	Ford	76.104	—
19	3	Austin Dillon	Richard Childress Racing	Chevrolet	76.126	—
20	31	Ryan Newman	Richard Childress Racing	Chevrolet	76.140	—
21	5	Kasey Kahne	Hendrick Motorsports	Chevrolet	76.167	—
22	17	Ricky Stenhouse Jr.	Roush Fenway Racing	Ford	76.189	—
23	2	Brad Keselowski	Team Penske	Ford	76.219	—
24	48	Jimmie Johnson	Hendrick Motorsports	Chevrolet	76.248	—
25	6	Trevor Bayne	Roush Fenway Racing	Ford	76.278	—
26	43	Billy Johnson	Richard Petty Motorsports	Ford	76.308	—
27	32	Matt DiBenedetto	Go Fas Racing	Ford	76.509	—
28	38	David Ragan	Front Row Motorsports	Ford	76.511	—
29	72	Cole Whitt	TriStar Motorsports	Chevrolet	76.605	—
30	77	Erik Jones (R)	Furniture Row Racing	Toyota	76.647	—
31	34	Landon Cassill	Front Row Motorsports	Ford	76.781	—
32	23	Alon Day	BK Racing	Toyota	77.007	—
33	51	Josh Bilicki (i)	Rick Ware Racing	Chevrolet	77.102	—
34	33	Boris Said	Circle Sport – The Motorsports Group	Chevrolet	77.109	—
35	13	Ty Dillon (R)	Germain Racing	Chevrolet	77.394	—
36	15	Kevin O'Connell	Premium Motorsports	Chevrolet	79.980	—
37	55	Tommy Regan	Premium Motorsports	Chevrolet	81.826	—
38	20	Matt Kenseth	Joe Gibbs Racing	Toyota	0.000	—
Official qualifying results

== Race ==
=== First stage ===
Kyle Larson led the field to the green flag at 3:22 p.m. With Sonoma Raceway being a more technical (rhythm) road course, brake usage is rather heavy, especially going into the 90° hairpin Turn 11. A few drivers locked up the brakes going into the turn in the early laps, including Daniel Suárez, who was making his first ever start at Sonoma. He flat-spotted his tires on the second lap and made an unscheduled stop the following lap to replace them. Two laps later, teammate Kyle Busch did the same. By the ninth lap, Martin Truex Jr. caught Larson and set him up for a pass heading into Turn 11 to take the race lead. Caution flew for the first time on lap 14 when Dale Earnhardt Jr. locked up his brakes and his car spun counter-clockwise, sending him through the hairpin and into the path of cars ahead, causing slight damage to Danica Patrick. Larson also suffered minor damage when he clipped Earnhardt. Chris Buescher took over the race lead because he opted not to pit under the caution.

The race restarted on lap 17 and Buescher led for another lap before teammate A. J. Allmendinger, on fresher tires, out-braked him going into Turn 10 to take the lead. Truex worked his way up to him, passed him entering Turn 11 to retake the lead and drove on to win the first stage on lap 25. Caution flew moments later for the completion of the stage.

=== Second stage ===
A lap after the ensuing restart on lap 30, Patrick (outside), Earnhardt (middle) and Larson (inside) tried to round Turn 4a three-wide, sending Earnhardt into the right-rear corner of Patrick and spinning her out into the path of Ricky Stenhouse Jr., who t-boned the drivers-side of her car. This brought out the third caution.

The race resumed on lap 33. Going into Turn 11 on the same lap, Allmendinger was clipped by Larson and spun in the hairpin. He was clipped by Clint Bowyer, but the race remained green. A caution did fly five laps later, however, for a piece of sheet metal in Turn 11.

Returning to green on lap 40, a number of cars – including race leader Truex – opted to short-pit the end of the second stage to set them up for the end of the race and because they didn't pit under the first stage break. This handed the race lead to Jimmie Johnson, who drove on to win the second stage. Caution flew moments later for the completion of the stage. Denny Hamlin assumed the race lead by electing not to pit.

=== Final stage ===
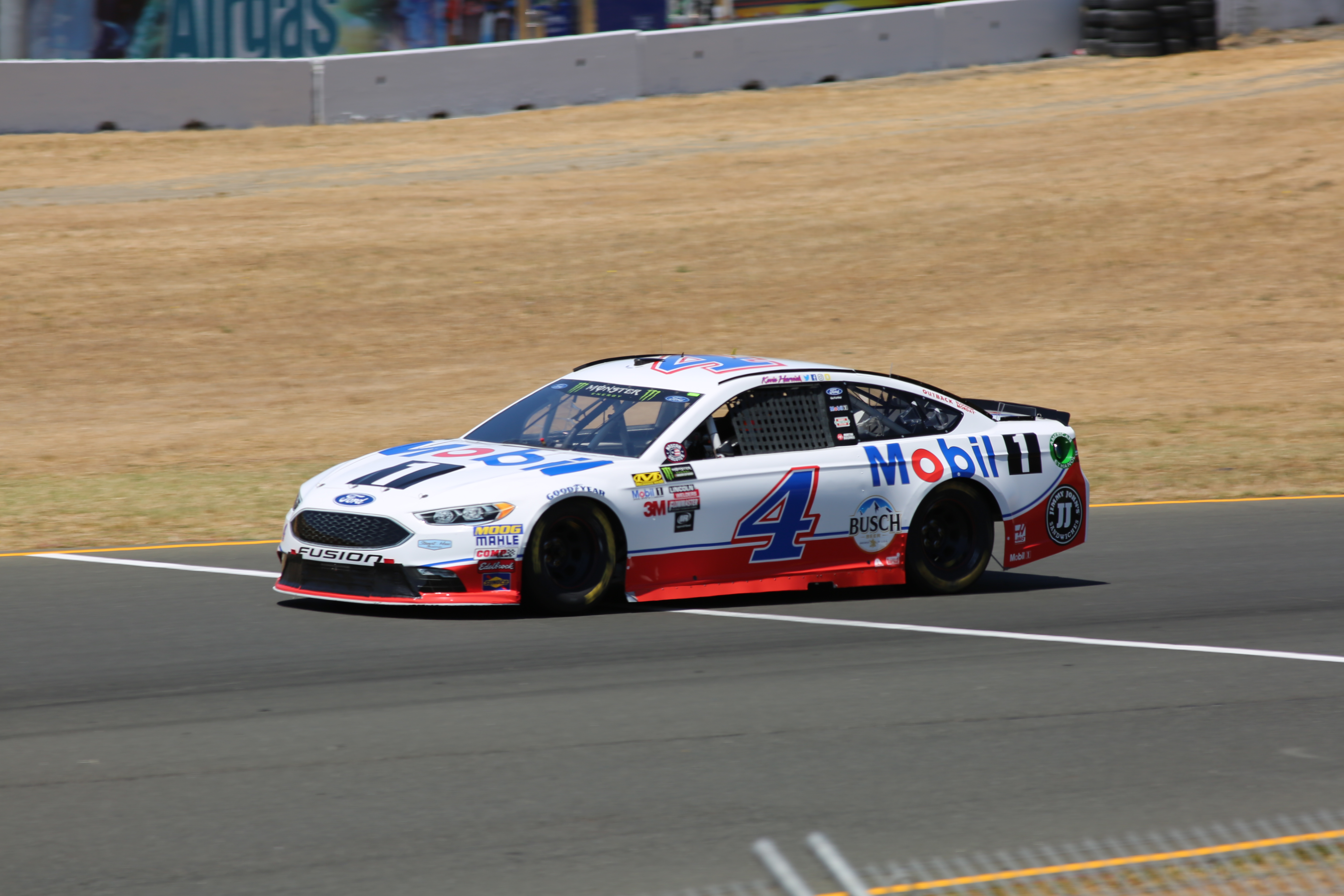
Kevin Harvick won the race.

The race restarted with 56 laps to go. With 47 to go, Busch took advantage of Hamlin's slip into Turn 11 to take the lead, only to allow Kevin Harvick to pass him unchallenged on the frontstretch two laps later. With 43 to go, Truex caught Harvick and out-braked him entering Turn 11 to retake the lead. On the following lap, cars were hitting pit road to make their final stop of the race. Truex did so with 40 to go, and a slow stop shuffled him behind Harvick in the running order. Jamie McMurray assumed the lead with 39 to go before pitting the next time around, handing the lead to Brad Keselowski, who was hoping for a caution.

Shortly after his slow stop, Truex reported he was losing a cylinder (engine was failing). He was fading at first, but then reported the problem had subsided. He worked his way up to third before making an unscheduled stop with 24 to go and subsequently to the garage for an engine failure.

With 24 to go, Harvick had closed the gap to Keselowski to 1.3 seconds. Two laps later, Harvick made the race-winning pass on Keselowski rounding Turn 7a and set sail. On the final lap, Kasey Kahne slammed the barriers on the frontstretch as Harvick was coming to the line. This ended the race under caution and Harvick, who had a nine-second lead over second-place Bowyer, drove on to victory.

== Race results ==
=== Stage results ===
Stage 1 Laps: 25

Pos	No	Driver	Team	Manufacturer	Points
1	78	Martin Truex Jr.	Furniture Row Racing	Toyota	10
2	47	A. J. Allmendinger	JTG Daugherty Racing	Chevrolet	9
3	42	Kyle Larson	Chip Ganassi Racing	Chevrolet	8
4	21	Ryan Blaney	Wood Brothers Racing	Ford	7
5	11	Denny Hamlin	Joe Gibbs Racing	Toyota	6
6	22	Joey Logano	Team Penske	Ford	5
7	6	Trevor Bayne	Roush Fenway Racing	Ford	4
8	3	Austin Dillon	Richard Childress Racing	Chevrolet	3
9	5	Kasey Kahne	Hendrick Motorsports	Chevrolet	2
10	14	Clint Bowyer	Stewart–Haas Racing	Ford	1
Official stage one results

Stage 2 Laps: 25

Pos	No	Driver	Team	Manufacturer	Points
1	48	Jimmie Johnson	Hendrick Motorsports	Chevrolet	10
2	2	Brad Keselowski	Team Penske	Ford	9
3	20	Matt Kenseth	Joe Gibbs Racing	Toyota	8
4	11	Denny Hamlin	Joe Gibbs Racing	Toyota	7
5	22	Joey Logano	Team Penske	Ford	6
6	88	Dale Earnhardt Jr.	Hendrick Motorsports	Chevrolet	5
7	21	Ryan Blaney	Wood Brothers Racing	Ford	4
8	3	Austin Dillon	Richard Childress Racing	Chevrolet	3
9	24	Chase Elliott	Hendrick Motorsports	Chevrolet	2
10	31	Ryan Newman	Richard Childress Racing	Chevrolet	1
Official stage two results

=== Final stage results ===
Stage 3 Laps: 60

Pos	Grid	No	Driver	Team	Manufacturer	Laps	Points
1	12	4	Kevin Harvick	Stewart–Haas Racing	Ford	110	40
2	13	14	Clint Bowyer	Stewart–Haas Racing	Ford	110	36
3	23	2	Brad Keselowski	Team Penske	Ford	110	43
4	14	11	Denny Hamlin	Joe Gibbs Racing	Toyota	110	46
5	4	18	Kyle Busch	Joe Gibbs Racing	Toyota	110	32
6	10	88	Dale Earnhardt Jr.	Hendrick Motorsports	Chevrolet	110	36
7	17	41	Kurt Busch	Stewart–Haas Racing	Ford	110	30
8	8	24	Chase Elliott	Hendrick Motorsports	Chevrolet	110	31
9	7	21	Ryan Blaney	Wood Brothers Racing	Ford	110	39
10	2	1	Jamie McMurray	Chip Ganassi Racing	Chevrolet	110	27
11	15	27	Paul Menard	Richard Childress Racing	Chevrolet	110	26
12	18	22	Joey Logano	Team Penske	Ford	110	36
13	24	48	Jimmie Johnson	Hendrick Motorsports	Chevrolet	110	34
14	16	95	Michael McDowell	Leavine Family Racing	Chevrolet	110	23
15	20	31	Ryan Newman	Richard Childress Racing	Chevrolet	110	23
16	11	19	Daniel Suárez (R)	Joe Gibbs Racing	Toyota	110	21
17	6	10	Danica Patrick	Stewart–Haas Racing	Ford	110	20
18	19	3	Austin Dillon	Richard Childress Racing	Chevrolet	110	25
19	9	37	Chris Buescher	JTG Daugherty Racing	Chevrolet	110	18
20	38	20	Matt Kenseth	Joe Gibbs Racing	Toyota	110	25
21	29	72	Cole Whitt	TriStar Motorsports	Chevrolet	110	16
22	26	43	Billy Johnson	Richard Petty Motorsports	Ford	110	15
23	27	32	Matt DiBenedetto	Go Fas Racing	Ford	110	14
24	21	5	Kasey Kahne	Hendrick Motorsports	Chevrolet	109	15
25	30	77	Erik Jones (R)	Furniture Row Racing	Toyota	109	12
26	1	42	Kyle Larson	Chip Ganassi Racing	Chevrolet	109	19
27	25	6	Trevor Bayne	Roush Fenway Racing	Ford	109	14
28	35	13	Ty Dillon (R)	Germain Racing	Chevrolet	109	9
29	34	33	Boris Said	Circle Sport – The Motorsports Group	Chevrolet	109	8
30	31	34	Landon Cassill	Front Row Motorsports	Ford	109	7
31	28	38	David Ragan	Front Row Motorsports	Ford	109	6
32	32	23	Alon Day	BK Racing	Toyota	108	5
33	36	15	Kevin O'Connell	Premium Motorsports	Chevrolet	108	4
34	37	55	Tommy Regan	Premium Motorsports	Chevrolet	107	3
35	5	47	A. J. Allmendinger	JTG Daugherty Racing	Chevrolet	104	11
36	33	51	Josh Bilicki (i)	Rick Ware Racing	Chevrolet	100	0
37	3	78	Martin Truex Jr.	Furniture Row Racing	Toyota	86	11
38	22	17	Ricky Stenhouse Jr.	Roush Fenway Racing	Ford	30	1
Official race results

=== Race statistics ===
- Lead changes: 10 among different drivers
- Cautions/Laps: 6 for 12
- Red flags: 0
- Time of race: 2 hours, 46 minutes and 52 seconds
- Average speed: 78.710 miles per hour (126.671 km/h)

== Media ==
=== Television ===
Fox NASCAR televised the race in the United States on FS1 for the third consecutive year. Mike Joy was the lap-by-lap announcer, while six-time Sonoma winner Jeff Gordon and Darrell Waltrip were the color commentators. Jamie Little, Chris Neville and Matt Yocum reported from pit lane during the race.

FS1 Television
Booth announcers	Pit reporters
Lap-by-lap: Mike Joy; Color-commentator: Jeff Gordon; Color commentator: Darrell Waltrip	Jamie Little; Chris Neville; Matt Yocum

=== Radio ===
Radio coverage of the race was broadcast by Performance Racing Network. PRN's broadcast of the race was simulcasted on Sirius XM NASCAR Radio. Doug Rice and Mark Garrow announced the race in the booth while the field was racing on the pit straight. Pat Patterson called the race from a stand outside of turn 2 when the field was racing up turns 2, 3 and 3a. Brad Gillie called the race from a stand outside of turn 7a when the field was racing through turns 4a and 7a. The field came back into the view of the booth in turns 8 and 9. Rob Albright called the race from a billboard outside turn 11 when the field was racing through turns 10 and 11. Jeff Hammond, Brett McMillan, Jim Noble and Wendy Venturini reported from pit lane during the race.

PRN
Booth announcers	Turn announcers	Pit reporters
Lead announcer: Doug Rice; Announcer: Mark Garrow	Turns 2, 3 & 3a: Pat Patterson; Turns 4a & 7a: Brad Gillie; Turns 10 & 11: Rob Albright	Jeff Hammond; Brett McMillan; Jim Noble; Wendy Venturini

== Standings after the race ==
Drivers' Championship standings

	Pos	Driver	Points
	1	Kyle Larson	659
	2	Martin Truex Jr.	646 (–13)
1	3	Kevin Harvick	548 (–111)
1	4	Kyle Busch	542 (–117)
1	5	Brad Keselowski	519 (–140)
1	6	Chase Elliott	509 (–150)
1	7	Jimmie Johnson	483 (–176)
1	8	Jamie McMurray	477 (–182)
	9	Denny Hamlin	476 (–183)
	10	Joey Logano	434 (–225)
1	11	Clint Bowyer	427 (–232)
1	12	Matt Kenseth	423 (–236)
	13	Ryan Blaney	415 (–244)
	14	Kurt Busch	389 (–270)
2	15	Ryan Newman	367 (–292)
	16	Erik Jones	358 (–301)
Official driver's standings

Manufacturers' Championship standings

Pos	Manufacturer	Points
1	Chevrolet	576
2	Ford	573 (–3)
3	Toyota	544 (–32)
Official manufacturers' standings

- Note: Only the first 16 positions are included for the driver standings.
- . – Driver has clinched a position in the Monster Energy NASCAR Cup Series playoffs.

Previous race: 2017 FireKeepers Casino 400	Monster Energy NASCAR Cup Series; 2017 season	Next race: 2017 Coke Zero 400
