= 2017 FireKeepers Casino 400 =

Race details
- Race 15 of 36 in the 2017 Monster Energy NASCAR Cup Series
- Date: June 18, 2017
- Location: Michigan International Speedway in Brooklyn, Michigan
- Course: Permanent racing facility
- Course length: 2.0 miles (3.2 km)
- Distance: 200 laps, 400 mi (640 km)
- Average speed: 143.369 miles per hour (230.730 km/h)

Pole position
| Driver | Kyle Larson | Chip Ganassi Racing |
- Time: 35.616

Most laps led
| Driver | Kyle Larson | Chip Ganassi Racing |
- Laps: 96

Winner
| No. 42 | Kyle Larson | Chip Ganassi Racing |

Television in the United States
- Network: FS1
- Announcers: Mike Joy, Jeff Gordon and Darrell Waltrip

Radio in the United States
- Radio: MRN
- Booth announcers: Joe Moore, Jeff Striegle and Rusty Wallace
- Turn announcers: Dave Moody (1–2) and Buddy Long (3–4)

The 2017 FireKeepers Casino 400 was a Monster Energy NASCAR Cup Series race held on June 18, 2017 at Michigan International Speedway in Brooklyn, Michigan. Contested over 200 laps on the two-mile (3.2 km) D-shaped oval, it was the 15th race of the 2017 Monster Energy NASCAR Cup Series season.

== Entry list ==
| No. | Driver | Team | Manufacturer |
|---|---|---|---|
| 1 | Jamie McMurray | Chip Ganassi Racing | Chevrolet |
| 2 | Brad Keselowski | Team Penske | Ford |
| 3 | Austin Dillon | Richard Childress Racing | Chevrolet |
| 4 | Kevin Harvick | Stewart–Haas Racing | Ford |
| 5 | Kasey Kahne | Hendrick Motorsports | Chevrolet |
| 6 | Trevor Bayne* | Roush Fenway Racing | Ford |
| 10 | Danica Patrick | Stewart–Haas Racing | Ford |
| 11 | Denny Hamlin | Joe Gibbs Racing | Toyota |
| 13 | Ty Dillon (R) | Germain Racing | Chevrolet |
| 14 | Clint Bowyer | Stewart–Haas Racing | Ford |
| 15 | Reed Sorenson | Premium Motorsports | Chevrolet |
| 17 | Ricky Stenhouse Jr. | Roush Fenway Racing | Ford |
| 18 | Kyle Busch | Joe Gibbs Racing | Toyota |
| 19 | Daniel Suárez (R) | Joe Gibbs Racing | Toyota |
| 20 | Matt Kenseth | Joe Gibbs Racing | Toyota |
| 21 | Ryan Blaney | Wood Brothers Racing | Ford |
| 22 | Joey Logano | Team Penske | Ford |
| 23 | Ryan Sieg (i) | BK Racing | Toyota |
| 24 | Chase Elliott | Hendrick Motorsports | Chevrolet |
| 27 | Paul Menard | Richard Childress Racing | Chevrolet |
| 31 | Ryan Newman | Richard Childress Racing | Chevrolet |
| 32 | Matt DiBenedetto | Go Fas Racing | Ford |
| 33 | Jeffrey Earnhardt | Circle Sport – The Motorsports Group | Chevrolet |
| 34 | Landon Cassill | Front Row Motorsports | Ford |
| 37 | Chris Buescher | JTG Daugherty Racing | Chevrolet |
| 38 | David Ragan | Front Row Motorsports | Ford |
| 41 | Kurt Busch | Stewart–Haas Racing | Ford |
| 42 | Kyle Larson | Chip Ganassi Racing | Chevrolet |
| 43 | Bubba Wallace (i) | Richard Petty Motorsports | Ford |
| 47 | A. J. Allmendinger | JTG Daugherty Racing | Chevrolet |
| 48 | Jimmie Johnson | Hendrick Motorsports | Chevrolet |
| 72 | Cole Whitt | TriStar Motorsports | Chevrolet |
| 77 | Erik Jones (R) | Furniture Row Racing | Toyota |
| 78 | Martin Truex Jr. | Furniture Row Racing | Toyota |
| 83 | Corey LaJoie (R) | BK Racing | Toyota |
| 88 | Dale Earnhardt Jr. | Hendrick Motorsports | Chevrolet |
| 95 | Michael McDowell | Leavine Family Racing | Chevrolet |
Official entry list

- Ryan Reed on standby if Bayne is unable to race due to the birth of Ashton and Trevor's second child.

== First practice ==
Kyle Larson was the fastest in the first practice session with a time of 35.857 seconds and a speed of 200.798 mph (323.153 km/h).

| Pos | No. | Driver | Team | Manufacturer | Time | Speed |
|---|---|---|---|---|---|---|
| 1 | 42 | Kyle Larson | Chip Ganassi Racing | Chevrolet | 35.857 | 200.798 |
| 2 | 18 | Kyle Busch | Joe Gibbs Racing | Toyota | 35.889 | 200.619 |
| 3 | 22 | Joey Logano | Team Penske | Ford | 35.914 | 200.479 |
Official first practice results

== Qualifying ==
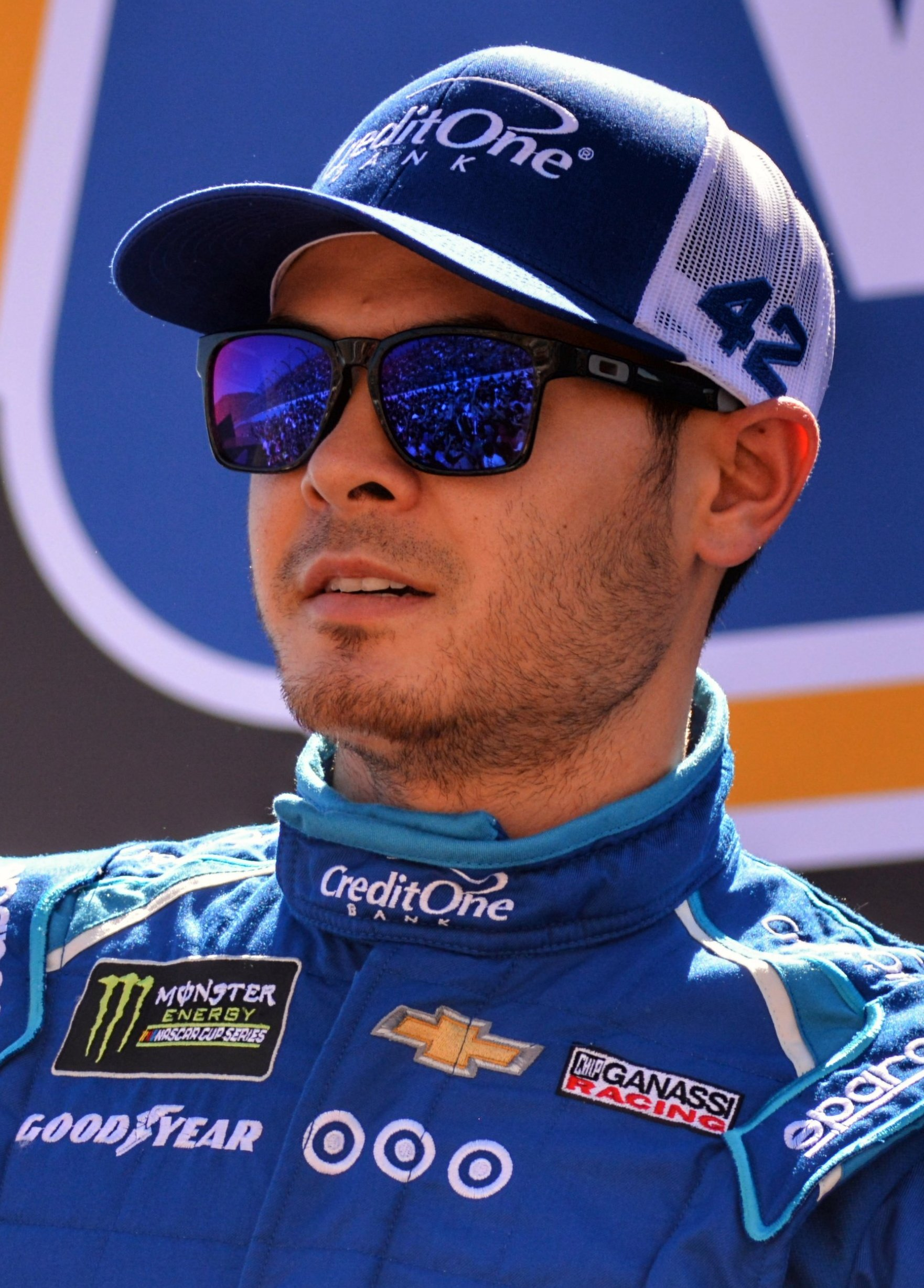
Kyle Larson won the pole.

Kyle Larson scored the pole for the race with a time of 35.616 and a speed of 202.156 mph (325.339 km/h).

=== Qualifying results ===
| Pos | No. | Driver | Team | Manufacturer | R1 | R2 | R3 |
|---|---|---|---|---|---|---|---|
| 1 | 42 | Kyle Larson | Chip Ganassi Racing | Chevrolet | 35.790 | 35.757 | 35.616 |
| 2 | 78 | Martin Truex Jr. | Furniture Row Racing | Toyota | 35.966 | 35.703 | 35.623 |
| 3 | 14 | Clint Bowyer | Stewart–Haas Racing | Ford | 36.277 | 35.823 | 35.703 |
| 4 | 18 | Kyle Busch | Joe Gibbs Racing | Toyota | 35.829 | 35.727 | 35.728 |
| 5 | 11 | Denny Hamlin | Joe Gibbs Racing | Toyota | 35.992 | 35.819 | 35.761 |
| 6 | 21 | Ryan Blaney | Wood Brothers Racing | Ford | 36.044 | 35.881 | 35.847 |
| 7 | 22 | Joey Logano | Team Penske | Ford | 36.205 | 35.855 | 35.862 |
| 8 | 1 | Jamie McMurray | Chip Ganassi Racing | Chevrolet | 35.992 | 35.887 | 35.867 |
| 9 | 20 | Matt Kenseth | Joe Gibbs Racing | Toyota | 36.206 | 35.911 | 35.869 |
| 10 | 24 | Chase Elliott | Hendrick Motorsports | Chevrolet | 36.200 | 35.888 | 35.932 |
| 11 | 4 | Kevin Harvick | Stewart–Haas Racing | Ford | 35.756 | 35.667 | 35.963 |
| 12 | 2 | Brad Keselowski | Team Penske | Ford | 35.984 | 35.905 | 35.991 |
| 13 | 48 | Jimmie Johnson | Hendrick Motorsports | Chevrolet | 35.938 | 35.945 | — |
| 14 | 77 | Erik Jones (R) | Furniture Row Racing | Toyota | 36.158 | 35.968 | — |
| 15 | 41 | Kurt Busch | Stewart–Haas Racing | Ford | 36.096 | 36.052 | — |
| 16 | 5 | Kasey Kahne | Hendrick Motorsports | Chevrolet | 36.286 | 36.114 | — |
| 17 | 88 | Dale Earnhardt Jr. | Hendrick Motorsports | Chevrolet | 36.150 | 36.140 | — |
| 18 | 3 | Austin Dillon | Richard Childress Racing | Chevrolet | 36.391 | 36.188 | — |
| 19 | 31 | Ryan Newman | Richard Childress Racing | Chevrolet | 36.196 | 36.234 | — |
| 20 | 19 | Daniel Suárez (R) | Joe Gibbs Racing | Toyota | 36.165 | 36.266 | — |
| 21 | 17 | Ricky Stenhouse Jr. | Roush Fenway Racing | Ford | 36.273 | 36.268 | — |
| 22 | 95 | Michael McDowell | Leavine Family Racing | Chevrolet | 36.271 | 36.325 | — |
| 23 | 10 | Danica Patrick | Stewart–Haas Racing | Ford | 36.291 | 36.405 | — |
| 24 | 13 | Ty Dillon (R) | Germain Racing | Chevrolet | 36.344 | 36.492 | — |
| 25 | 37 | Chris Buescher | JTG Daugherty Racing | Chevrolet | 36.451 | — | — |
| 26 | 47 | A. J. Allmendinger | JTG Daugherty Racing | Chevrolet | 36.459 | — | — |
| 27 | 43 | Bubba Wallace (i) | Richard Petty Motorsports | Ford | 36.474 | — | — |
| 28 | 6 | Trevor Bayne | Roush Fenway Racing | Ford | 36.519 | — | — |
| 29 | 32 | Matt DiBenedetto | Go Fas Racing | Ford | 36.693 | — | — |
| 30 | 38 | David Ragan | Front Row Motorsports | Ford | 36.776 | — | — |
| 31 | 27 | Paul Menard | Richard Childress Racing | Chevrolet | 36.807 | — | — |
| 32 | 23 | Ryan Sieg (i) | BK Racing | Toyota | 37.177 | — | — |
| 33 | 83 | Corey LaJoie (R) | BK Racing | Toyota | 37.408 | — | — |
| 34 | 72 | Cole Whitt | TriStar Motorsports | Chevrolet | 37.594 | — | — |
| 35 | 15 | Reed Sorenson | Premium Motorsports | Chevrolet | 37.834 | — | — |
| 36 | 33 | Jeffrey Earnhardt | Circle Sport – The Motorsports Group | Chevrolet | 37.895 | — | — |
| 37 | 34 | Landon Cassill | Front Row Motorsports | Ford | 0.000 | — | — |
Official qualifying results

== Practice (post-qualifying) ==
=== Second practice ===
Martin Truex Jr. was the fastest in the second practice session with a time of 36.293 seconds and a speed of 198.385 mph (319.270 km/h).

| Pos | No. | Driver | Team | Manufacturer | Time | Speed |
|---|---|---|---|---|---|---|
| 1 | 78 | Martin Truex Jr. | Furniture Row Racing | Toyota | 36.293 | 198.385 |
| 2 | 18 | Kyle Busch | Joe Gibbs Racing | Toyota | 36.375 | 197.938 |
| 3 | 48 | Jimmie Johnson | Hendrick Motorsports | Chevrolet | 36.485 | 197.341 |
Official second practice results

=== Final practice ===
Brad Keselowski was the fastest in the final practice session with a time of 36.474 seconds and a speed of 197.401 mph (317.686 km/h).

| Pos | No. | Driver | Team | Manufacturer | Time | Speed |
|---|---|---|---|---|---|---|
| 1 | 2 | Brad Keselowski | Team Penske | Ford | 36.474 | 197.401 |
| 2 | 18 | Kyle Busch | Joe Gibbs Racing | Toyota | 36.512 | 197.195 |
| 3 | 42 | Kyle Larson | Chip Ganassi Racing | Chevrolet | 36.537 | 197.061 |
Official final practice results

== Race ==
=== First stage ===
Kyle Larson led the field to the green flag at 3:20 p.m. There were reports early on of trash bags circulating in the air, with one landing on the front stretch and bringing out a caution on the seventh lap. Due to the timing of the early caution, NASCAR decided to move the scheduled competition caution back five laps from it would've originally flown on lap 20.

Back to green on lap 11, this run was a short 14-lap burst that concluded with the competition caution on lap 25.

Four laps after the lap 30 restart, Martin Truex Jr. passed Larson going into Turn 3 to take the lead and drove on to win the stage on lap 60. Caution flew moments later for the conclusion of the stage. Larson returned to the lead under the caution when he exited pit road first. During this run, Erik Jones was running in the top-10 when he made an unscheduled stop for a loose wheel on lap 41.

=== Second stage ===
After going back to green on lap 68, the race settled into a green flag run that lasted the entire length of the stage that was only broken up by green flag stops starting on lap 107. Larson pitted from the lead the following lap, followed by Kyle Busch three laps later, giving the lead to Brad Keselowski. He pitted on lap 113 and the lead cycled back to Larson.

As was the case in the first stage, Truex passed Larson exiting Turn 4 to retake the lead on lap 116, drove on to win the second stage on lap 120 and caution flew for the end of the stage. Unlike the first stage, Truex beat Larson off pit road to maintain the lead.

=== Final stage ===
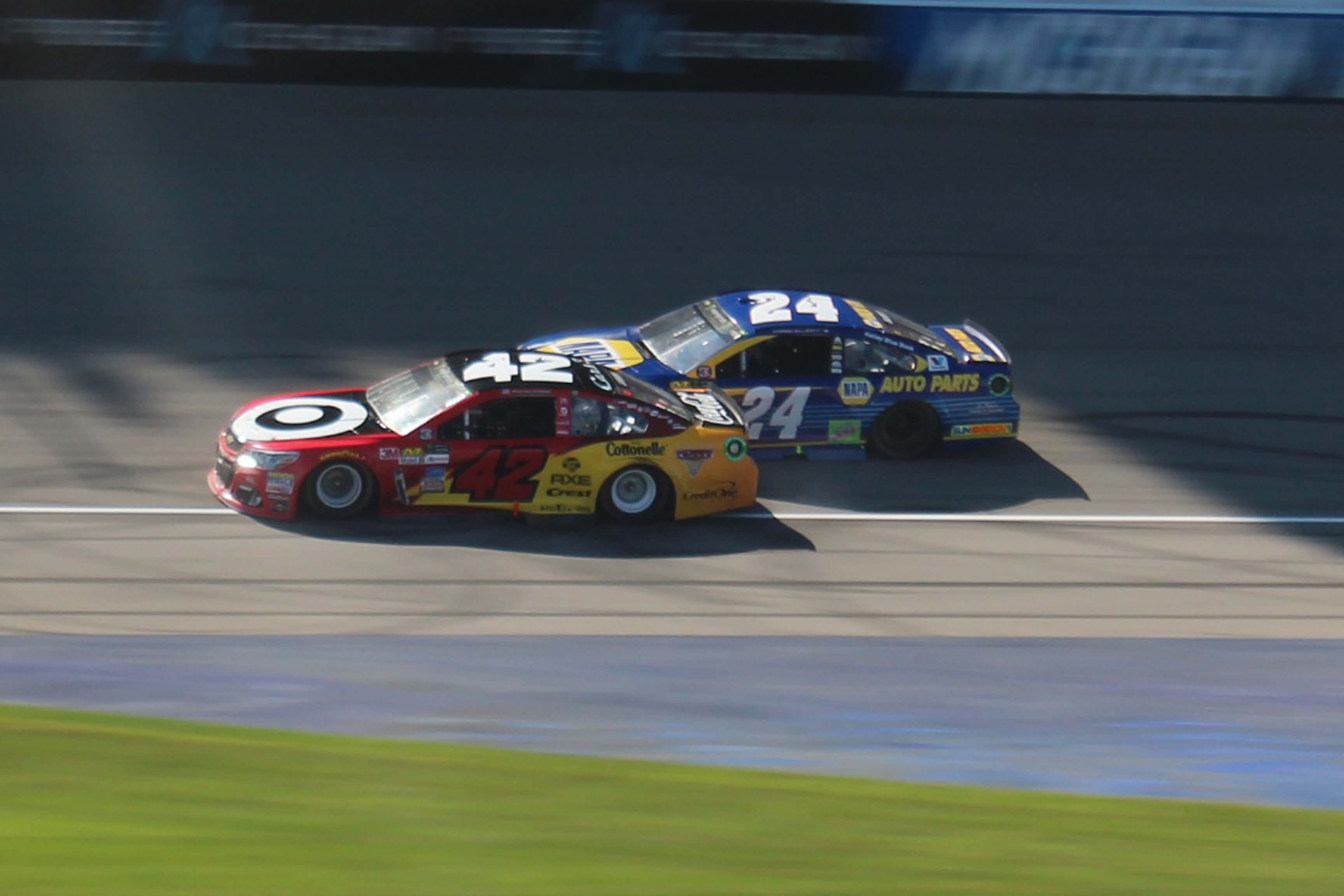
Kyle Larson and Chase Elliott battle for the lead in the later stages of the race

The race settled into another green flag run after the restart on lap 128, which was disrupted by Ryan Sieg spinning out, in front of race leader Truex, in Turn 4 with 50 laps to go, bringing out the fifth caution. Busch exited pit road with the race lead. Ricky Stenhouse Jr. restarted from the tail-end of the field for speeding on pit road.

Back to green with 46 to go, everyone was on the razor's edge of making it to the end on fuel (with a fuel run at Michigan falling roughly between 40 and 45 laps). That dilemma went out the window, however, when debris in Turn 2 brought out the sixth caution with 21 to go. Tony Stewart, co-owner of Stewart–Haas Racing, tweeted after the race it was "a shame that so many drivers and teams day was ruined by the results of another 'debris' caution towards the end of the race today."

Busch failed to fend off Larson on the restart with 15 to go and lost the lead to him going into Turn 1. Caution flew the following lap when Clint Bowyer tagged the wall in Turn 2. After the race, Bowyer said he was "sitting there seventh with 20 laps to go reeling them in thinking this was our day, and then a debris caution forces a restart (referencing the proceeding debris caution)." He added that restarts are realistically "the only times you can pass, so everyone was racing hard, and I got into the wall. It killed our day.”

On the following restart with 10 to go, a domino-effect stack-up rounding Turns 1 and 2 resulted in Danica Patrick being hit exiting Turn 2, sliding down the apron and slamming the inside wall on the backstretch, therefore bringing out the eighth and final caution.

Restarting with five to go, Denny Hamlin, who restarted aside Larson, lost the spot to Chase Elliott and third to Joey Logano. Larson held off Elliott in the closing laps to score the victory.

== Race results ==
=== Stage results ===
Stage 1 Laps: 60

| Pos | No | Driver | Team | Manufacturer | Points |
|---|---|---|---|---|---|
| 1 | 78 | Martin Truex Jr. | Furniture Row Racing | Toyota | 10 |
| 2 | 42 | Kyle Larson | Chip Ganassi Racing | Chevrolet | 9 |
| 3 | 18 | Kyle Busch | Joe Gibbs Racing | Toyota | 8 |
| 4 | 11 | Denny Hamlin | Joe Gibbs Racing | Toyota | 7 |
| 5 | 20 | Matt Kenseth | Joe Gibbs Racing | Toyota | 6 |
| 6 | 14 | Clint Bowyer | Stewart–Haas Racing | Ford | 5 |
| 7 | 21 | Ryan Blaney | Wood Brothers Racing | Ford | 4 |
| 8 | 24 | Chase Elliott | Hendrick Motorsports | Chevrolet | 3 |
| 9 | 22 | Joey Logano | Team Penske | Ford | 2 |
| 10 | 48 | Jimmie Johnson | Hendrick Motorsports | Chevrolet | 1 |
Official stage one results

Stage 2 Laps: 60

| Pos | No | Driver | Team | Manufacturer | Points |
|---|---|---|---|---|---|
| 1 | 78 | Martin Truex Jr. | Furniture Row Racing | Toyota | 10 |
| 2 | 18 | Kyle Busch | Joe Gibbs Racing | Toyota | 9 |
| 3 | 42 | Kyle Larson | Chip Ganassi Racing | Chevrolet | 8 |
| 4 | 20 | Matt Kenseth | Joe Gibbs Racing | Toyota | 7 |
| 5 | 14 | Clint Bowyer | Stewart–Haas Racing | Ford | 6 |
| 6 | 4 | Kevin Harvick | Stewart–Haas Racing | Ford | 5 |
| 7 | 11 | Denny Hamlin | Joe Gibbs Racing | Toyota | 4 |
| 8 | 41 | Kurt Busch | Stewart–Haas Racing | Ford | 3 |
| 9 | 24 | Chase Elliott | Hendrick Motorsports | Chevrolet | 2 |
| 10 | 2 | Brad Keselowski | Team Penske | Ford | 1 |
Official stage two results

=== Final stage results ===
Stage 3 Laps: 80

| Pos | Grid | No | Driver | Team | Manufacturer | Laps | Points |
|---|---|---|---|---|---|---|---|
| 1 | 1 | 42 | Kyle Larson | Chip Ganassi Racing | Chevrolet | 200 | 57 |
| 2 | 10 | 24 | Chase Elliott | Hendrick Motorsports | Chevrolet | 200 | 40 |
| 3 | 7 | 22 | Joey Logano | Team Penske | Ford | 200 | 36 |
| 4 | 5 | 11 | Denny Hamlin | Joe Gibbs Racing | Toyota | 200 | 44 |
| 5 | 8 | 1 | Jamie McMurray | Chip Ganassi Racing | Chevrolet | 200 | 32 |
| 6 | 2 | 78 | Martin Truex Jr. | Furniture Row Racing | Toyota | 200 | 51 |
| 7 | 4 | 18 | Kyle Busch | Joe Gibbs Racing | Toyota | 200 | 47 |
| 8 | 21 | 17 | Ricky Stenhouse Jr. | Roush Fenway Racing | Ford | 200 | 29 |
| 9 | 17 | 88 | Dale Earnhardt Jr. | Hendrick Motorsports | Chevrolet | 200 | 28 |
| 10 | 13 | 48 | Jimmie Johnson | Hendrick Motorsports | Chevrolet | 200 | 28 |
| 11 | 9 | 20 | Matt Kenseth | Joe Gibbs Racing | Toyota | 200 | 39 |
| 12 | 15 | 41 | Kurt Busch | Stewart–Haas Racing | Ford | 200 | 28 |
| 13 | 14 | 77 | Erik Jones (R) | Furniture Row Racing | Toyota | 200 | 24 |
| 14 | 11 | 4 | Kevin Harvick | Stewart–Haas Racing | Ford | 200 | 28 |
| 15 | 19 | 31 | Ryan Newman | Richard Childress Racing | Chevrolet | 200 | 22 |
| 16 | 12 | 2 | Brad Keselowski | Team Penske | Ford | 200 | 22 |
| 17 | 27 | 6 | Trevor Bayne | Roush Fenway Racing | Ford | 200 | 20 |
| 18 | 25 | 47 | A. J. Allmendinger | JTG Daugherty Racing | Chevrolet | 200 | 19 |
| 19 | 26 | 43 | Bubba Wallace (i) | Richard Petty Motorsports | Ford | 200 | 0 |
| 20 | 37 | 13 | Ty Dillon (R) | Germain Racing | Chevrolet | 200 | 17 |
| 21 | 16 | 5 | Kasey Kahne | Hendrick Motorsports | Chevrolet | 200 | 16 |
| 22 | 30 | 27 | Paul Menard | Richard Childress Racing | Chevrolet | 200 | 15 |
| 23 | 22 | 95 | Michael McDowell | Leavine Family Racing | Chevrolet | 200 | 14 |
| 24 | 20 | 19 | Daniel Suárez (R) | Joe Gibbs Racing | Toyota | 200 | 13 |
| 25 | 6 | 21 | Ryan Blaney | Wood Brothers Racing | Ford | 200 | 16 |
| 26 | 3 | 14 | Clint Bowyer | Stewart–Haas Racing | Ford | 200 | 22 |
| 27 | 18 | 3 | Austin Dillon | Richard Childress Racing | Chevrolet | 199 | 10 |
| 28 | 28 | 32 | Matt DiBenedetto | Go Fas Racing | Ford | 199 | 9 |
| 29 | 29 | 38 | David Ragan | Front Row Motorsports | Ford | 198 | 8 |
| 30 | 32 | 83 | Corey LaJoie (R) | BK Racing | Toyota | 197 | 7 |
| 31 | 33 | 72 | Cole Whitt | TriStar Motorsports | Chevrolet | 197 | 6 |
| 32 | 36 | 34 | Landon Cassill | Front Row Motorsports | Ford | 196 | 5 |
| 33 | 31 | 23 | Ryan Sieg (i) | BK Racing | Toyota | 196 | 0 |
| 34 | 34 | 15 | Reed Sorenson | Premium Motorsports | Chevrolet | 195 | 3 |
| 35 | 35 | 33 | Jeffrey Earnhardt | Circle Sport – The Motorsports Group | Chevrolet | 195 | 2 |
| 36 | 24 | 37 | Chris Buescher | JTG Daugherty Racing | Chevrolet | 194 | 1 |
| 37 | 23 | 10 | Danica Patrick | Stewart–Haas Racing | Ford | 190 | 1 |
Official race results

=== Race statistics ===
- Lead changes: 4 among different drivers
- Cautions/Laps: 8 for 34
- Red flags: 0
- Time of race: 2 hours, 47 minutes and 24 seconds
- Average speed: 143.369 miles per hour (230.730 km/h)

== Media ==
=== Television ===
Fox NASCAR televised the race in the United States on FS1 for the third consecutive year. Mike Joy was the lap-by-lap announcer, while three-time Michigan winner, Jeff Gordon and two-time winner Darrell Waltrip were the color commentators. Jamie Little, Chris Neville and Matt Yocum reported from pit lane during the race.

FS1 Television
| Booth announcers | Pit reporters |
|---|---|
| Lap-by-lap: Mike Joy; Color-commentator: Jeff Gordon; Color commentator: Darrell Waltrip | Jamie Little; Chris Neville; Matt Yocum |

=== Radio ===
Radio coverage of the race was broadcast by Motor Racing Network (MRN) and simulcasted on Sirius XM NASCAR Radio. Joe Moore, Jeff Striegle and five-time Michigan winner Rusty Wallace announced the race in the booth while the field is racing on the front stretch. Dave Moody called the race from a billboard outside of turn 2 when the field was racing through turns 1 and 2. Mike Bagley called the race from a platform outside of turn 3 when the field was racing through turns 3 and 4. Alex Hayden, Winston Kelley and Steve Post reported from pit lane during the race.

MRN
| Booth announcers | Turn announcers | Pit reporters |
|---|---|---|
| Lead announcer: Joe Moore; Announcer: Jeff Striegle; Announcer: Rusty Wallace | Turns 1 & 2: Dave Moody; Turns 3 & 4: Buddy Long | Alex Hayden; Winston Kelley; Steve Post |

== Standings after the race ==
Drivers' Championship standings

| | Pos | Driver | Points |
|---|---|---|---|
| 1 | 1 | Kyle Larson | 640 |
| 1 | 2 | Martin Truex Jr. | 635 (–5) |
| 1 | 3 | Kyle Busch | 510 (–130) |
| 1 | 4 | Kevin Harvick | 508 (–132) |
| 1 | 5 | Chase Elliott | 478 (–162) |
| 1 | 6 | Brad Keselowski | 476 (–164) |
| 1 | 7 | Jamie McMurray | 450 (–190) |
| 1 | 8 | Jimmie Johnson | 449 (–191) |
| | 9 | Denny Hamlin | 430 (–210) |
| 1 | 10 | Joey Logano | 398 (–242) |
| 2 | 11 | Matt Kenseth | 398 (–242) |
| 2 | 12 | Clint Bowyer | 391 (–249) |
| 1 | 13 | Ryan Blaney | 376 (–264) |
| | 14 | Kurt Busch | 359 (–281) |
| | 15 | Ricky Stenhouse Jr. | 354 (–286) |
| 1 | 16 | Erik Jones | 346 (–294) |
Official driver's standings

Manufacturers' Championship standings

| Pos | Manufacturer | Points |
|---|---|---|
| 1 | Chevrolet | 545 |
| 2 | Ford | 533 (–12) |
| 3 | Toyota | 511 (–34) |
Official manufacturers' standings

- Note: Only the first 16 positions are included for the driver standings.
- . – Driver has clinched a position in the Monster Energy NASCAR Cup Series playoffs.

| Previous race: 2017 Axalta presents the Pocono 400 | Monster Energy NASCAR Cup Series; 2017 season | Next race: 2017 Toyota/Save Mart 350 |
