= 2017 AAA 400 Drive for Autism =

Race details
- Race 13 of 36 in the 2017 Monster Energy NASCAR Cup Series
- Date: June 4, 2017
- Location: Dover International Speedway in Dover, Delaware
- Course: Permanent racing facility
- Course length: 1 miles (1.609 km)
- Distance: 406 laps, 406 mi (653.394 km)
- Scheduled distance: 400 laps, 400 mi (643.738 km)
- Weather: Sunny with a temperature of 85 °F (29 °C); wind out of the south at 6 mph (9.7 km/h)
- Average speed: 104.955 miles per hour (168.909 km/h)

Pole position
Driver	Kyle Busch	Joe Gibbs Racing
- Time: 22.648

Most laps led
Driver	Kyle Larson	Chip Ganassi Racing
- Laps: 241

Winner
No. 48	Jimmie Johnson	Hendrick Motorsports

Television in the United States
- Network: FS1
- Announcers: Mike Joy, Jeff Gordon and Darrell Waltrip
- Nielsen ratings: 2.1/4 (Final); 3.4 million viewers

Radio in the United States
- Radio: MRN
- Booth announcers: Joe Moore, Jeff Striegle and Rusty Wallace
- Turn announcers: Mike Bagley (Backstretch)

The 2017 AAA 400 Drive for Autism was a Monster Energy NASCAR Cup Series race held on June 4, 2017, at Dover International Speedway in Dover, Delaware. Contested over 406 laps, extended from 400 laps due to overtime, on the 1-mile (1.6-kilometre) concrete speedway, it was the 13th race of the 2017 Monster Energy NASCAR Cup Series season.

As of 2025, this race was the most recent career win (his 83rd) for seven-time NASCAR Cup Series champion Jimmie Johnson, who retired from full time competition after the 2020 season, but returned on a part-time basis at the 2023 Daytona 500.

Ross Chastain and Ryan Sieg both made their first Cup Series start at the event, finishing 20th and 26th respectively.

== Entry list ==
No.	Driver	Team	Manufacturer
1	Jamie McMurray	Chip Ganassi Racing	Chevrolet
2	Brad Keselowski	Team Penske	Ford
3	Austin Dillon	Richard Childress Racing	Chevrolet
4	Kevin Harvick	Stewart–Haas Racing	Ford
5	Kasey Kahne	Hendrick Motorsports	Chevrolet
6	Trevor Bayne	Roush Fenway Racing	Ford
10	Danica Patrick	Stewart–Haas Racing	Ford
11	Denny Hamlin	Joe Gibbs Racing	Toyota
13	Ty Dillon (R)	Germain Racing	Chevrolet
14	Clint Bowyer	Stewart–Haas Racing	Ford
15	Ross Chastain (i)	Premium Motorsports	Chevrolet
17	Ricky Stenhouse Jr.	Roush Fenway Racing	Ford
18	Kyle Busch	Joe Gibbs Racing	Toyota
19	Daniel Suárez (R)	Joe Gibbs Racing	Toyota
20	Matt Kenseth	Joe Gibbs Racing	Toyota
21	Ryan Blaney	Wood Brothers Racing	Ford
22	Joey Logano	Team Penske	Ford
23	Gray Gaulding (R)	BK Racing	Toyota
24	Chase Elliott	Hendrick Motorsports	Chevrolet
27	Paul Menard	Richard Childress Racing	Chevrolet
31	Ryan Newman	Richard Childress Racing	Chevrolet
32	Matt DiBenedetto	Go Fas Racing	Ford
33	Jeffrey Earnhardt	Circle Sport – The Motorsports Group	Chevrolet
34	Landon Cassill	Front Row Motorsports	Ford
37	Chris Buescher	JTG Daugherty Racing	Chevrolet
38	David Ragan	Front Row Motorsports	Ford
41	Kurt Busch	Stewart–Haas Racing	Ford
42	Kyle Larson	Chip Ganassi Racing	Chevrolet
43	Regan Smith (i)	Richard Petty Motorsports	Ford
47	A. J. Allmendinger	JTG Daugherty Racing	Chevrolet
48	Jimmie Johnson	Hendrick Motorsports	Chevrolet
51	Cody Ware	Rick Ware Racing	Chevrolet
66	Timmy Hill (i)	MBM Motorsports	Chevrolet
72	Cole Whitt	TriStar Motorsports	Chevrolet
77	Erik Jones (R)	Furniture Row Racing	Toyota
78	Martin Truex Jr.	Furniture Row Racing	Toyota
83	Ryan Sieg (i)	BK Racing	Toyota
88	Dale Earnhardt Jr.	Hendrick Motorsports	Chevrolet
95	Michael McDowell	Leavine Family Racing	Chevrolet
Official entry list

== First practice ==
Kyle Larson was the fastest in the first practice session with a time of 22.512 seconds and a speed of 159.915 mph (257.358 km/h).

Pos	No.	Driver	Team	Manufacturer	Time	Speed
1	42	Kyle Larson	Chip Ganassi Racing	Chevrolet	22.512	159.915
2	20	Matt Kenseth	Joe Gibbs Racing	Toyota	22.556	159.603
3	18	Kyle Busch	Joe Gibbs Racing	Toyota	22.585	159.398
Official first practice results

== Qualifying ==
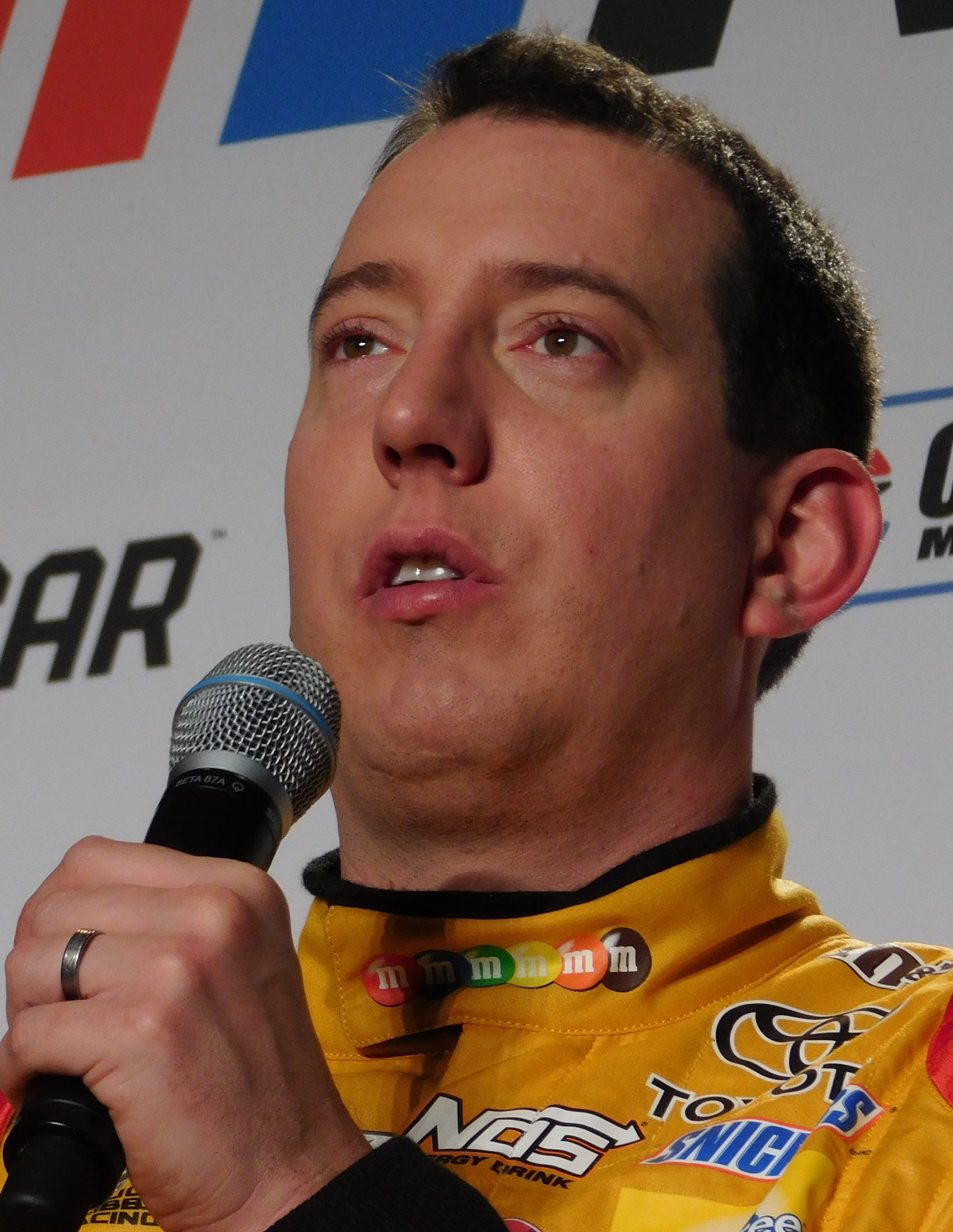
Kyle Busch won the pole.

Kyle Busch scored the pole for the race with a time of 22.648 and a speed of 158.954 mph (255.812 km/h). He said afterwards that it means "a little bit for us (his team)" to go "sit on the pole here" because it grants "a really good pit selection for Sunday" and to boot, "gives us the track position. We know the 78 car (Truex said) is going to be fast – they always are – and one of the guys we're going to have to race against", Busch added. "There's going to be many others that are starting farther back that we'll be racing against, too, before the end of the day, but we'll work on our Dogs Rule Pedigree Camry tomorrow in practice and make sure we get a good race setup underneath us, so we can hopefully stay up front."

=== Qualifying results ===
Pos	No.	Driver	Team	Manufacturer	R1	R2	R3
1	18	Kyle Busch	Joe Gibbs Racing	Toyota	22.892	22.554	22.648
2	78	Martin Truex Jr.	Furniture Row Racing	Toyota	22.665	22.748	22.659
3	19	Daniel Suárez (R)	Joe Gibbs Racing	Toyota	22.731	22.789	22.735
4	20	Matt Kenseth	Joe Gibbs Racing	Toyota	22.760	22.764	22.753
5	42	Kyle Larson	Chip Ganassi Racing	Chevrolet	22.644	22.756	22.759
6	41	Kurt Busch	Stewart–Haas Racing	Ford	22.692	22.627	22.764
7	77	Erik Jones (R)	Furniture Row Racing	Toyota	22.766	22.738	22.831
8	2	Brad Keselowski	Team Penske	Ford	22.877	22.829	22.874
9	3	Austin Dillon	Richard Childress Racing	Chevrolet	22.927	22.782	22.914
10	11	Denny Hamlin	Joe Gibbs Racing	Toyota	22.916	22.828	22.925
11	88	Dale Earnhardt Jr.	Hendrick Motorsports	Chevrolet	22.889	22.830	23.037
12	17	Ricky Stenhouse Jr.	Roush Fenway Racing	Ford	22.762	22.634	23.077
13	31	Ryan Newman	Richard Childress Racing	Chevrolet	22.989	22.836	—
14	48	Jimmie Johnson	Hendrick Motorsports	Chevrolet	22.955	22.851	—
15	21	Ryan Blaney	Wood Brothers Racing	Ford	22.930	22.865	—
16	24	Chase Elliott	Hendrick Motorsports	Chevrolet	22.831	22.881	—
17	6	Trevor Bayne	Roush Fenway Racing	Ford	22.958	22.887	—
18	4	Kevin Harvick	Stewart–Haas Racing	Ford	22.921	22.892	—
19	1	Jamie McMurray	Chip Ganassi Racing	Chevrolet	22.751	22.907	—
20	5	Kasey Kahne	Hendrick Motorsports	Chevrolet	22.945	22.928	—
21	13	Ty Dillon (R)	Germain Racing	Chevrolet	22.955	22.968	—
22	14	Clint Bowyer	Stewart–Haas Racing	Ford	22.910	22.978	—
23	27	Paul Menard	Richard Childress Racing	Chevrolet	22.966	23.011	—
24	47	A. J. Allmendinger	JTG Daugherty Racing	Chevrolet	22.956	23.015	—
25	32	Matt DiBenedetto	Go Fas Racing	Ford	23.017	—	—
26	22	Joey Logano	Team Penske	Ford	23.042	—	—
27	34	Landon Cassill	Front Row Motorsports	Ford	23.047	—	—
28	95	Michael McDowell	Leavine Family Racing	Chevrolet	23.067	—	—
29	37	Chris Buescher	JTG Daugherty Racing	Chevrolet	23.120	—	—
30	43	Regan Smith (i)	Richard Petty Motorsports	Ford	23.136	—	—
31	10	Danica Patrick	Stewart–Haas Racing	Ford	23.162	—	—
32	23	Gray Gaulding (R)	BK Racing	Toyota	23.269	—	—
33	38	David Ragan	Front Row Motorsports	Ford	23.288	—	—
34	83	Ryan Sieg (i)	BK Racing	Toyota	23.514	—	—
35	72	Cole Whitt	TriStar Motorsports	Chevrolet	23.696	—	—
36	15	Ross Chastain (i)	Premium Motorsports	Chevrolet	23.738	—	—
37	66	Timmy Hill (i)	MBM Motorsports	Chevrolet	23.864	—	—
38	51	Cody Ware	Rick Ware Racing	Chevrolet	23.988	—	—
39	33	Jeffrey Earnhardt	Circle Sport – The Motorsports Group	Chevrolet	24.036	—	—
Official qualifying results

== Practice (post-qualifying) ==
=== Second practice ===
Kyle Busch was the fastest in the second practice session with a time of 22.779 seconds and a speed of 158.040 mph (254.341 km/h).

Pos	No.	Driver	Team	Manufacturer	Time	Speed
1	18	Kyle Busch	Joe Gibbs Racing	Toyota	22.779	158.040
2	21	Ryan Blaney	Wood Brothers Racing	Ford	22.795	157.929
3	78	Martin Truex Jr.	Furniture Row Racing	Toyota	22.803	157.874
Official second practice results

=== Final practice ===
Kyle Larson was the fastest in the final practice session with a time of 22.870 seconds and a speed of 157.411 mph (253.328 km/h).

Pos	No.	Driver	Team	Manufacturer	Time	Speed
1	42	Kyle Larson	Chip Ganassi Racing	Chevrolet	22.870	157.411
2	48	Jimmie Johnson	Hendrick Motorsports	Chevrolet	22.886	157.301
3	18	Kyle Busch	Joe Gibbs Racing	Toyota	22.894	157.246
Official final practice results

== Race ==
=== First stage ===
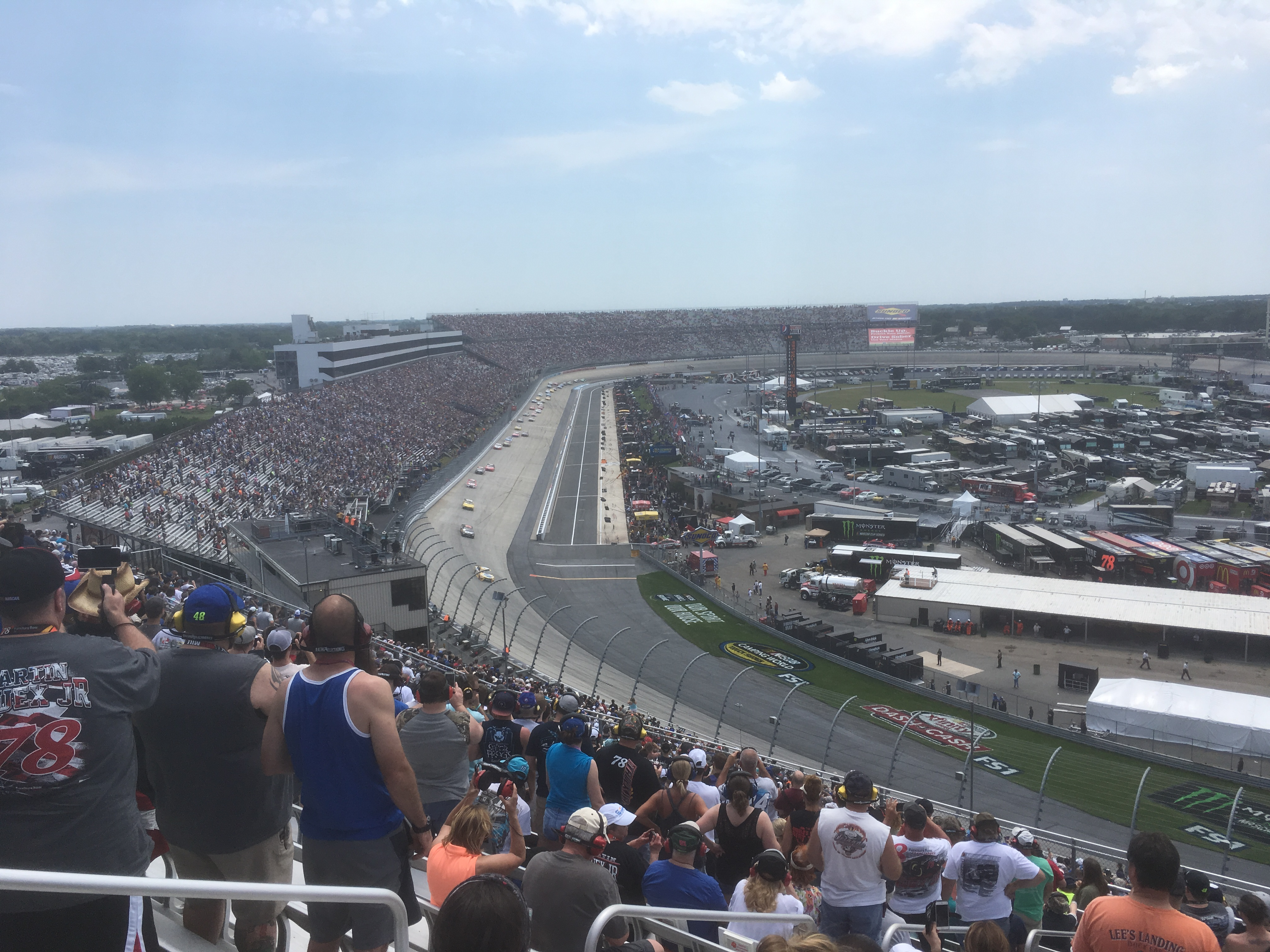
Polesitter Kyle Busch leads early in the race

Kyle Busch led the field to the green flag at 1:19 p.m. The first run of green flag racing lasted just 17 laps before Ryan Sieg went for a solo spin in Turn 2, bringing out the first caution of the race. Ricky Stenhouse Jr. opted not to pit under the caution and assumed the race lead. Exiting pit road, Busch's left-rear tire detached from the car. It was found that one of the airguns the 18 team used to change the tires didn't switch to the setting required to tighten the lug nuts.

Back to green on lap 22, Martin Truex Jr. achieved a better restart and took the lead. Staying out proved costly for Stenhouse on lap 47 when his right-front tire went flat and his car slammed the wall in Turn 3, bringing out a second caution. Kyle Larson took just right-side tires and exited pit road with the race lead. Chase Elliott (speeding) and Denny Hamlin (uncontrolled tire) restarted from the tail-end of the field on the ensuing restart for pit road infractions.

Restarting on lap 52, the race remained green for the next 10 laps before Stenhouse slammed the wall a second time in Turn 4, bringing out the third caution.

On the lap 65 restart, Kurt Busch got loose underneath Larson in Turn 1, overcorrected, turned up the track and slammed into Brad Keselowski, sending him into the wall, bringing out the fourth caution. Keselowski called the incident "one of them racing deals" and the field just "[lined] up double file and somebody got loose and just took us out. What a bummer. Just one of them racing deals."

The race restarted on lap 70. Truex caught Larson five laps later and the two ran side-by-side for four laps. Truex gave Larson a shove heading down the backstretch on lap 80, making Larson loose going into Turn 3 and allowing Truex to take the lead. Busch suffered a left-rear tire blowout, spun out and rear-ended the wall in Turn 1 on lap 96, bringing out the fifth caution. Busch said he "got loose on a restart" and it was his "bad as a driver. We had good speed in our car and just couldn't finish. You can't make mistakes out here and we did."

The race returned to green on lap 104 and Truex won the first stage, bringing out the sixth caution on lap 120 for the end of the stage. Larson opted not to pit and took the lead. Trevor Bayne restarted from the tail-end of the field on the following restart for speeding on pit road.

=== Second stage ===
When the race resumed on lap 128, Larson started pulling away from the field. By lap 134, he was two seconds ahead of Matt Kenseth in second. By lap 140, that lead grew to 3.6 seconds. Danica Patrick brought out the seventh caution on lap 144 when she spun out in Turn 4. Michael McDowell took the lead after opting not to pit.

Larson retook the lead with ease on the lap 150 restart. Unlike the short-run, caution-filled first stage, the second stage settled into a green flag lull with 43 straight laps of green flag racing. Larson pulled to a lead of roughly three seconds and held there until caution flew for the eighth time on lap 193 when Joey Logano's right-front tire went flat and he slammed the wall in Turn 3.

Larson spun the tires on the lap 198 restart, but maintained the lead over Truex. As opposed to the last run, Larson drove away from the field, Truex caught Larson on lap 209 and passed him in Turn 1 to take the lead on lap 212. Caution flew for the ninth time on lap 219 when Landon Cassill's right-front tire went flat and his car slammed the wall in Turn 2. Truex exited pit road with the race lead, while Larson exited 19th.

The race resumed on lap 222 and Truex won the second stage, and caution flew for the 10th time for the conclusion of the stage. Larson took just right-side tires and exited pit road with the race lead. Ryan Blaney broke a rear axle on the pit stop and took his car to the garage. He returned to the race two laps down.

=== Final stage ===
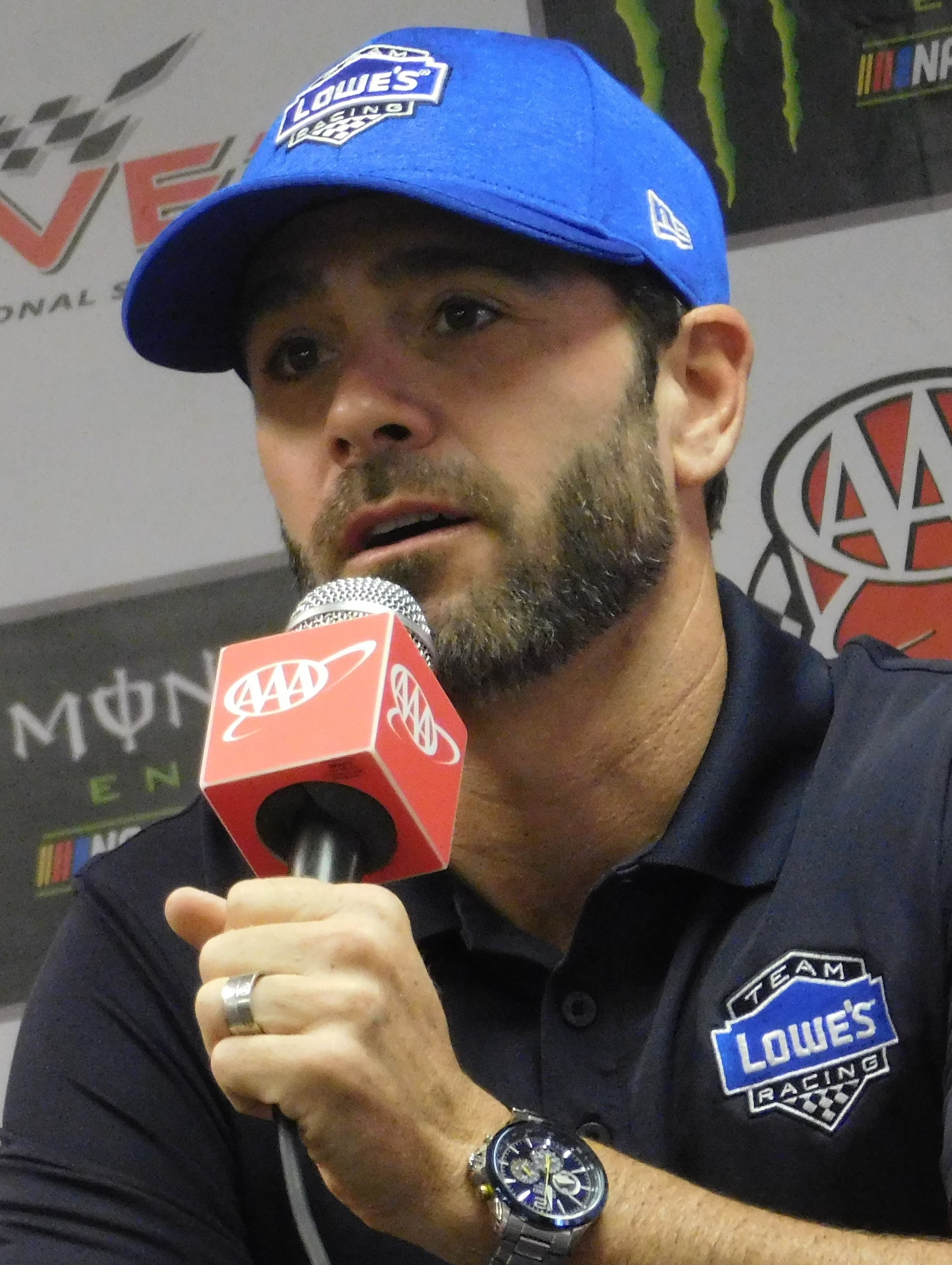
Jimmie Johnson won the race.

Two laps after the lap 248 restart, Truex got loose and lost second to Jimmie Johnson. Debris on the frontstretch brought out the 11th caution on lap 263.

Resuming green flag conditions with 132 laps to go, the race remained green long enough for a cycle of green flag pit stops with 75 to go. Larson pitted from the lead the following lap, handing it to Johnson. Regan Smith, driving in place of the injured Aric Almirola, slammed the wall in Turn 2 after his right-front tire went flat bringing out the 12th caution. Ty Dillon exited pit road with the race lead.

The race returned to green with 65 to go. Exiting Turn 2 with 58 to go, Chris Buescher got loose and into Paul Menard, sending him into the inside wall on the backstretch, bringing out the 13th caution.

The race restarted with 52 to go. Larson powered by Johnson on his outside in Turn 1 to take second with 42 to go, and passed Dillon on the high-side to take the lead with 39 to go. Johnson passed Dillon to take second and cut Larson's lead to just around a second. But as the laps started to wind down, Larson increased the gap and had the race in check. The lead he built up evaporated when David Ragan suffered a right-front tire blowout and slammed the wall in Turn 2 with four laps to go, bringing out the 14th caution and set up an overtime finish. Ragan's wreck laid oil all down the backstretch and NASCAR had to apply speedy-dry to clean it up.

==== Overtime ====
The race restarted in overtime with two to go. Johnson achieved a superior restart to Larson and took the lead. Dillon got loose exiting Turn 2 and came down across the nose of Ryan Newman. His car turned back up track and was t-boned by Erik Jones, triggering a multi-car wreck on the backstretch and bringing out the final caution. Johnson had crossed the overtime line, located on the backstretch at the R of Dover, and was in Turn 3 when the caution ended the race and was declared the winner.

== Race results ==
=== Stage results ===
Stage 1 Laps: 120

Pos	No	Driver	Team	Manufacturer	Points
1	78	Martin Truex Jr.	Furniture Row Racing	Toyota	10
2	42	Kyle Larson	Chip Ganassi Racing	Chevrolet	9
3	4	Kevin Harvick	Stewart–Haas Racing	Ford	8
4	20	Matt Kenseth	Joe Gibbs Racing	Toyota	7
5	48	Jimmie Johnson	Hendrick Motorsports	Chevrolet	6
6	5	Kasey Kahne	Hendrick Motorsports	Chevrolet	5
7	21	Ryan Blaney	Wood Brothers Racing	Ford	4
8	77	Erik Jones (R)	Furniture Row Racing	Toyota	3
9	18	Kyle Busch	Joe Gibbs Racing	Toyota	2
10	19	Daniel Suárez (R)	Joe Gibbs Racing	Toyota	1
Official stage one results

Stage 2 Laps: 120

Pos	No	Driver	Team	Manufacturer	Points
1	78	Martin Truex Jr.	Furniture Row Racing	Toyota	10
2	48	Jimmie Johnson	Hendrick Motorsports	Chevrolet	9
3	20	Matt Kenseth	Joe Gibbs Racing	Toyota	8
4	18	Kyle Busch	Joe Gibbs Racing	Toyota	7
5	42	Kyle Larson	Chip Ganassi Racing	Chevrolet	6
6	4	Kevin Harvick	Stewart–Haas Racing	Ford	5
7	24	Chase Elliott	Hendrick Motorsports	Chevrolet	4
8	21	Ryan Blaney	Wood Brothers Racing	Ford	3
9	77	Erik Jones (R)	Furniture Row Racing	Toyota	2
10	5	Kasey Kahne	Hendrick Motorsports	Chevrolet	1
Official stage two results

=== Final stage results ===
Stage 3 Laps: 166

Pos	Grid	No	Driver	Team	Manufacturer	Laps	Points
1	14	48	Jimmie Johnson	Hendrick Motorsports	Chevrolet	406	55
2	5	42	Kyle Larson	Chip Ganassi Racing	Chevrolet	406	50
3	2	78	Martin Truex Jr.	Furniture Row Racing	Toyota	406	54
4	13	31	Ryan Newman	Richard Childress Racing	Chevrolet	406	33
5	16	24	Chase Elliott	Hendrick Motorsports	Chevrolet	406	36
6	3	19	Daniel Suárez (R)	Joe Gibbs Racing	Toyota	406	32
7	19	1	Jamie McMurray	Chip Ganassi Racing	Chevrolet	406	30
8	10	11	Denny Hamlin	Joe Gibbs Racing	Toyota	406	29
9	18	4	Kevin Harvick	Stewart–Haas Racing	Ford	406	41
10	31	10	Danica Patrick	Stewart–Haas Racing	Ford	406	27
11	11	88	Dale Earnhardt Jr.	Hendrick Motorsports	Chevrolet	406	26
12	9	20	Matt Kenseth	Joe Gibbs Racing	Toyota	406	40
13	4	3	Austin Dillon	Richard Childress Racing	Chevrolet	406	24
14	21	13	Ty Dillon (R)	Germain Racing	Chevrolet	406	23
15	7	77	Erik Jones (R)	Furniture Row Racing	Toyota	405	27
16	1	18	Kyle Busch	Joe Gibbs Racing	Toyota	405	30
17	20	5	Kasey Kahne	Hendrick Motorsports	Chevrolet	404	26
18	24	47	A. J. Allmendinger	JTG Daugherty Racing	Chevrolet	404	19
19	28	95	Michael McDowell	Leavine Family Racing	Chevrolet	404	18
20	36	15	Ross Chastain (i)	Premium Motorsports	Chevrolet	403	0
21	17	6	Trevor Bayne	Roush Fenway Racing	Ford	402	16
22	35	72	Cole Whitt	TriStar Motorsports	Chevrolet	402	15
23	29	37	Chris Buescher	JTG Daugherty Racing	Chevrolet	402	14
24	32	23	Gray Gaulding (R)	BK Racing	Toyota	402	13
25	26	22	Joey Logano	Team Penske	Ford	402	12
26	34	83	Ryan Sieg (i)	BK Racing	Toyota	400	0
27	39	33	Jeffrey Earnhardt	Circle Sport – The Motorsports Group	Chevrolet	400	10
28	37	66	Timmy Hill (i)	MBM Motorsports	Chevrolet	398	0
29	25	32	Matt DiBenedetto	Go Fas Racing	Ford	397	8
30	33	38	David Ragan	Front Row Motorsports	Ford	393	7
31	22	14	Clint Bowyer	Stewart–Haas Racing	Ford	391	6
32	15	21	Ryan Blaney	Wood Brothers Racing	Ford	373	12
33	23	27	Paul Menard	Richard Childress Racing	Chevrolet	343	4
34	30	43	Regan Smith (i)	Richard Petty Motorsports	Ford	329	0
35	38	51	Cody Ware	Rick Ware Racing	Chevrolet	283	2
36	27	34	Landon Cassill	Front Row Motorsports	Ford	257	1
37	6	41	Kurt Busch	Stewart–Haas Racing	Ford	93	1
38	8	2	Brad Keselowski	Team Penske	Ford	66	1
39	12	17	Ricky Stenhouse Jr.	Roush Fenway Racing	Ford	62	1
Official race results

=== Race statistics ===
- Lead changes: 17 among 9 different drivers
- Cautions/Laps: 15 for 72 laps
- Red flags: 0
- Time of race: 3 hours, 52 minutes and 6 seconds
- Average speed: 104.955 miles per hour (168.909 km/h)

== Media ==
=== Television ===
Fox Sports covered their 17th race at Dover International Speedway. Mike Joy, five-time Dover winner Jeff Gordon and two-time Dover winner Darrell Waltrip had the call in the broadcast booth, while Jamie Little, Vince Welch and Matt Yocum handled the action on pit road.

FS1
Booth announcers	Pit reporters
Lap-by-lap: Mike Joy; Color commentator: Jeff Gordon; Color commentator: Darrell Waltrip	Jamie Little; Vince Welch; Matt Yocum

=== Radio ===
MRN had the radio call for the race which was also simulcasted on SiriusXM's NASCAR Radio channel.

MRN Radio
Booth announcers	Turn announcers	Pit reporters
Lead announcer: Joe Moore; Announcer: Jeff Striegle; Announcer: Rusty Wallace	Backstretch: Mike Bagley	Kim Coon; Alex Hayden; Glenn Jarrett; Woody Cain

== Standings after the race ==
Drivers' Championship standings

	Pos	Driver	Points
	1	Martin Truex Jr.	545
	2	Kyle Larson	536 (–9)
1	3	Kevin Harvick	429 (–116)
1	4	Kyle Busch	416 (–129)
1	5	Jamie McMurray	415 (–130)
2	6	Jimmie Johnson	414 (–131)
4	7	Brad Keselowski	410 (–135)
1	8	Chase Elliott	398 (–147)
2	9	Denny Hamlin	361 (–184)
1	10	Clint Bowyer	349 (–196)
1	11	Joey Logano	348 (–197)
3	12	Matt Kenseth	327 (–218)
1	13	Ryan Blaney	320 (–225)
1	14	Ricky Stenhouse Jr.	299 (–246)
2	15	Ryan Newman	299 (–246)
2	16	Kurt Busch	291 (–254)
Official driver's standings

Manufacturers' Championship standings

Pos	Manufacturer	Points
1	Chevrolet	475
2	Ford	459 (–16)
3	Toyota	444 (–41)
Official manufacturers' standings

- Note: Only the first 16 positions are included for the driver standings.
- . – Driver has clinched a position in the Monster Energy NASCAR Cup Series playoffs.

Previous race: 2017 Coca-Cola 600	Monster Energy NASCAR Cup Series; 2017 season	Next race: 2017 Axalta presents the Pocono 400
