= 2017 Axalta presents the Pocono 400 =

Race details
- Race 14 of 36 in the 2017 Monster Energy NASCAR Cup Series
- The 2017 Axalta presents the Pocono 400 program cover, featuring Kurt Busch.
- Date: June 11, 2017
- Location: Pocono Raceway in Long Pond, Pennsylvania
- Course: Permanent racing facility
- Course length: 2.5 miles (4 km)
- Distance: 160 laps, 400 mi (640 km)
- Average speed: 142.292 miles per hour (228.997 km/h)

Pole position
Driver	Kyle Busch	Joe Gibbs Racing
- Time: 50.237

Most laps led
Driver	Kyle Busch	Joe Gibbs Racing
- Laps: 100

Winner
No. 21	Ryan Blaney	Wood Brothers Racing

Television in the United States
- Network: FS1
- Announcers: Mike Joy, Jeff Gordon and Darrell Waltrip

Radio in the United States
- Radio: MRN
- Booth announcers: Joe Moore, Jeff Striegle and Rusty Wallace
- Turn announcers: Dave Moody (1), Mike Bagley (2) and Kyle Rickey (3)

The 2017 Axalta presents the Pocono 400 was a Monster Energy NASCAR Cup Series race held on June 11, 2017, at Pocono Raceway in Long Pond, Pennsylvania. The race was contested over 160 laps on the 2.5-mile (4.0 km) triangular superspeedway, and was the 14th race of the 2017 Monster Energy NASCAR Cup Series season.

== Entry list ==
No.	Driver	Team	Manufacturer
1	Jamie McMurray	Chip Ganassi Racing	Chevrolet
2	Brad Keselowski	Team Penske	Ford
3	Austin Dillon	Richard Childress Racing	Chevrolet
4	Kevin Harvick	Stewart–Haas Racing	Ford
5	Kasey Kahne	Hendrick Motorsports	Chevrolet
6	Trevor Bayne	Roush Fenway Racing	Ford
10	Danica Patrick	Stewart–Haas Racing	Ford
11	Denny Hamlin	Joe Gibbs Racing	Toyota
13	Ty Dillon (R)	Germain Racing	Chevrolet
14	Clint Bowyer	Stewart–Haas Racing	Ford
15	Reed Sorenson	Premium Motorsports	Toyota
17	Ricky Stenhouse Jr.	Roush Fenway Racing	Ford
18	Kyle Busch	Joe Gibbs Racing	Toyota
19	Daniel Suárez (R)	Joe Gibbs Racing	Toyota
20	Matt Kenseth	Joe Gibbs Racing	Toyota
21	Ryan Blaney	Wood Brothers Racing	Ford
22	Joey Logano	Team Penske	Ford
23	Gray Gaulding (R)	BK Racing	Toyota
24	Chase Elliott	Hendrick Motorsports	Chevrolet
27	Paul Menard	Richard Childress Racing	Chevrolet
31	Ryan Newman	Richard Childress Racing	Chevrolet
32	Matt DiBenedetto	Go Fas Racing	Ford
33	Jeffrey Earnhardt	Circle Sport – The Motorsports Group	Chevrolet
34	Landon Cassill	Front Row Motorsports	Ford
37	Chris Buescher	JTG Daugherty Racing	Chevrolet
38	David Ragan	Front Row Motorsports	Ford
41	Kurt Busch	Stewart–Haas Racing	Ford
42	Kyle Larson	Chip Ganassi Racing	Chevrolet
43	Bubba Wallace (i)	Richard Petty Motorsports	Ford
47	A. J. Allmendinger	JTG Daugherty Racing	Chevrolet
48	Jimmie Johnson	Hendrick Motorsports	Chevrolet
51	Cody Ware	Rick Ware Racing	Chevrolet
55	Derrike Cope	Premium Motorsports	Chevrolet
72	Cole Whitt	TriStar Motorsports	Chevrolet
77	Erik Jones (R)	Furniture Row Racing	Toyota
78	Martin Truex Jr.	Furniture Row Racing	Toyota
83	Corey LaJoie (R)	BK Racing	Toyota
88	Dale Earnhardt Jr.	Hendrick Motorsports	Chevrolet
95	Michael McDowell	Leavine Family Racing	Chevrolet
Official entry list

== First practice ==
Kyle Larson was the fastest in the first practice session with a time of 50.758 seconds and a speed of 177.312 mph (285.356 km/h).

Pos	No.	Driver	Team	Manufacturer	Time	Speed
1	42	Kyle Larson	Chip Ganassi Racing	Chevrolet	50.758	177.312
2	18	Kyle Busch	Joe Gibbs Racing	Toyota	50.780	177.235
3	20	Matt Kenseth	Joe Gibbs Racing	Toyota	50.865	176.939
Official first practice results

== Qualifying ==
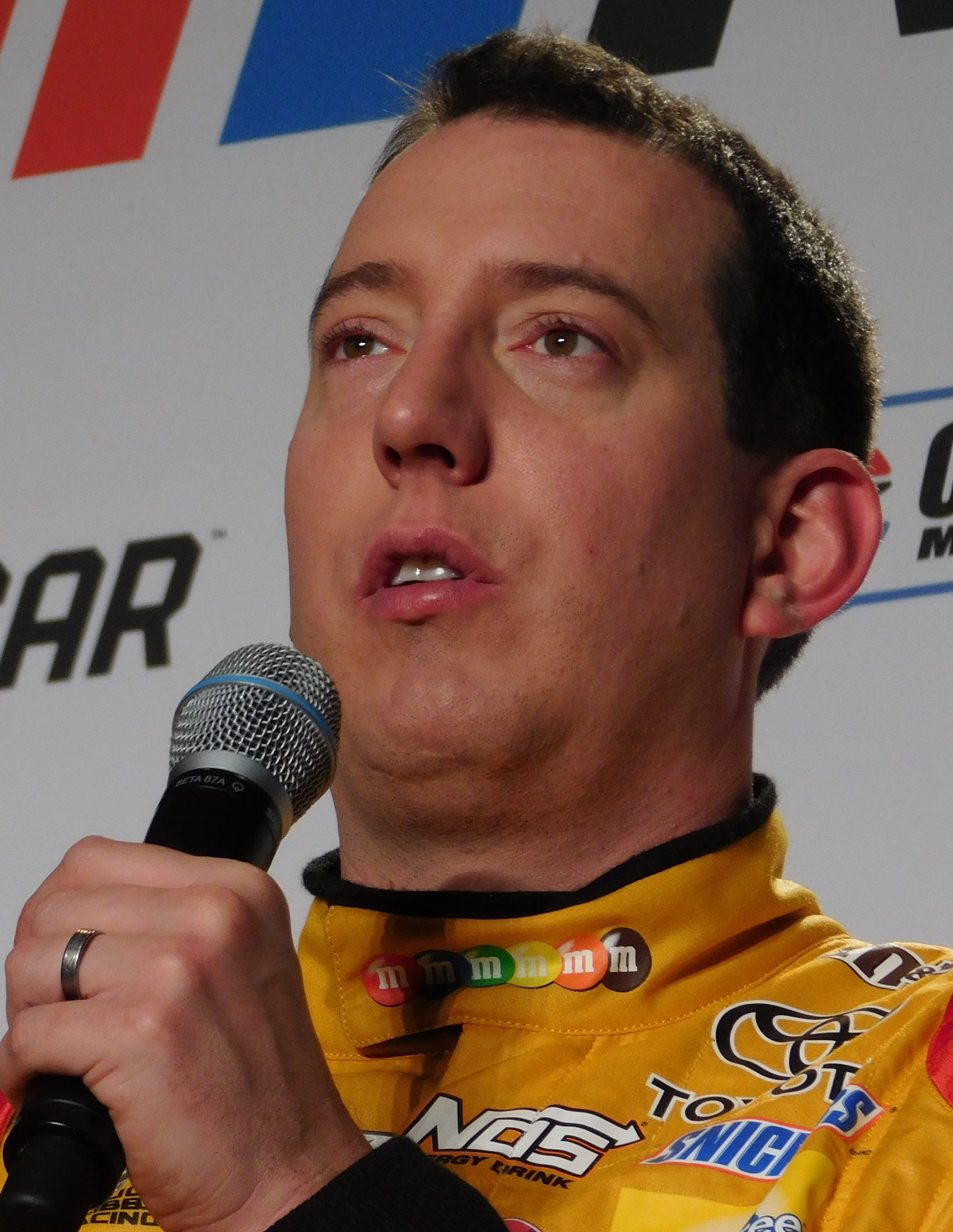
Kyle Busch scored the pole position.

Kyle Busch scored the pole for the race with a time of 50.237 and a speed of 179.151 mph (288.316 km/h).

=== Qualifying results ===
Pos	No.	Driver	Team	Manufacturer	R1	R2	R3
1	18	Kyle Busch	Joe Gibbs Racing	Toyota	50.546	50.425	50.237
2	78	Martin Truex Jr.	Furniture Row Racing	Toyota	50.980	50.578	50.408
3	20	Matt Kenseth	Joe Gibbs Racing	Toyota	51.220	50.537	50.531
4	21	Ryan Blaney	Wood Brothers Racing	Ford	51.023	50.478	50.591
5	41	Kurt Busch	Stewart–Haas Racing	Ford	50.952	50.895	50.619
6	2	Brad Keselowski	Team Penske	Ford	50.906	50.782	50.621
7	42	Kyle Larson	Chip Ganassi Racing	Chevrolet	50.385	50.903	50.688
8	1	Jamie McMurray	Chip Ganassi Racing	Chevrolet	51.119	50.866	50.742
9	22	Joey Logano	Team Penske	Ford	50.797	50.473	50.774
10	31	Ryan Newman	Richard Childress Racing	Chevrolet	50.952	50.936	50.840
11	95	Michael McDowell	Leavine Family Racing	Chevrolet	51.331	50.975	50.871
12	4	Kevin Harvick	Stewart–Haas Racing	Ford	50.737	50.560	50.974
13	27	Paul Menard	Richard Childress Racing	Chevrolet	50.949	50.982	—
14	19	Daniel Suárez (R)	Joe Gibbs Racing	Toyota	51.298	51.003	—
15	77	Erik Jones (R)	Furniture Row Racing	Toyota	51.151	51.075	—
16	43	Bubba Wallace (i)	Richard Petty Motorsports	Ford	51.176	51.094	—
17	3	Austin Dillon	Richard Childress Racing	Chevrolet	51.295	51.101	—
18	11	Denny Hamlin	Joe Gibbs Racing	Toyota	51.224	51.122	—
19	48	Jimmie Johnson	Hendrick Motorsports	Chevrolet	51.200	51.225	—
20	14	Clint Bowyer	Stewart–Haas Racing	Ford	51.354	51.257	—
21	47	A. J. Allmendinger	JTG Daugherty Racing	Chevrolet	51.276	51.258	—
22	6	Trevor Bayne	Roush Fenway Racing	Ford	51.225	51.291	—
23	17	Ricky Stenhouse Jr.	Roush Fenway Racing	Ford	51.298	51.502	—
24	10	Danica Patrick	Stewart–Haas Racing	Ford	51.357	52.124	—
25	24	Chase Elliott	Hendrick Motorsports	Chevrolet	51.363	—	—
26	5	Kasey Kahne	Hendrick Motorsports	Chevrolet	51.504	—	—
27	13	Ty Dillon (R)	Germain Racing	Chevrolet	51.669	—	—
28	88	Dale Earnhardt Jr.	Hendrick Motorsports	Chevrolet	51.774	—	—
29	37	Chris Buescher	JTG Daugherty Racing	Chevrolet	51.830	—	—
30	32	Matt DiBenedetto	Go Fas Racing	Ford	51.898	—	—
31	38	David Ragan	Front Row Motorsports	Ford	52.046	—	—
32	72	Cole Whitt	TriStar Motorsports	Chevrolet	52.114	—	—
33	23	Gray Gaulding (R)	BK Racing	Toyota	52.229	—	—
34	34	Landon Cassill	Front Row Motorsports	Ford	52.248	—	—
35	83	Corey LaJoie (R)	BK Racing	Toyota	52.738	—	—
36	15	Reed Sorenson	Premium Motorsports	Toyota	53.494	—	—
37	33	Jeffrey Earnhardt	Circle Sport – The Motorsports Group	Chevrolet	53.770	—	—
38	51	Cody Ware	Rick Ware Racing	Chevrolet	54.108	—	—
39	55	Derrike Cope	Premium Motorsports	Chevrolet	55.825	—	—
Official qualifying results

== Final practice ==
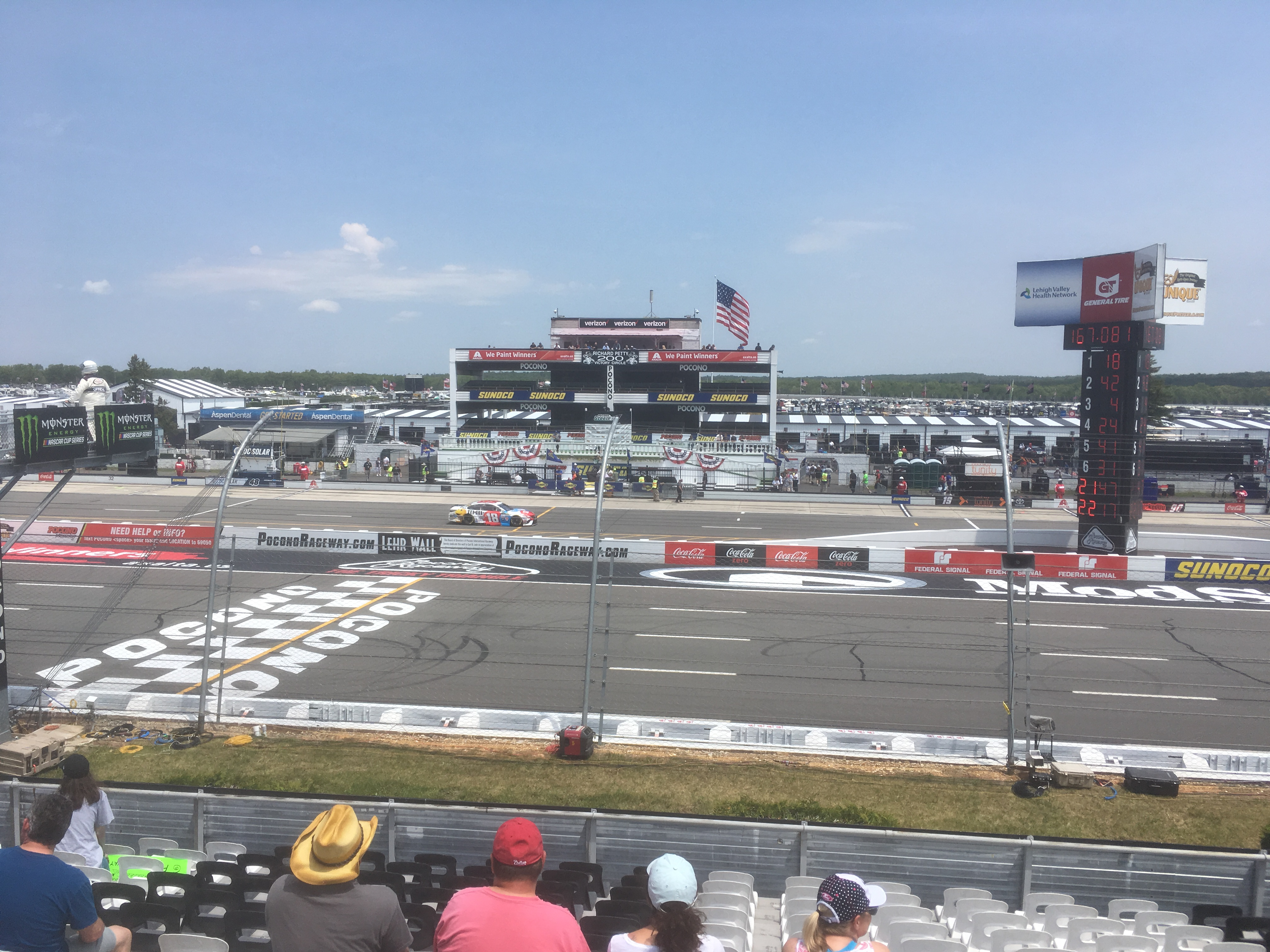
Final practice

Kyle Busch was the fastest in the final practice session with a time of 51.305 seconds and a speed of 175.421 mph (282.313 km/h).

Pos	No.	Driver	Team	Manufacturer	Time	Speed
1	18	Kyle Busch	Joe Gibbs Racing	Toyota	51.305	175.421
2	2	Brad Keselowski	Team Penske	Ford	51.345	175.285
3	42	Kyle Larson	Chip Ganassi Racing	Chevrolet	51.367	175.210
Official final practice results

== Race ==
=== First stage ===
Kyle Busch led the field to the green flag at 3:22 p.m. Aside from an unscheduled pit stop by Joey Logano for a flat left-rear tire on the sixth lap, nothing unusual happened in the early stage of the race. It proceeded in an orderly fashion, only interrupted by a cycle of green flag stops on lap 14. Busch pitted from the lead on lap 18, followed by Kyle Larson pitted the next lap, and the lead moved to Erik Jones. He pitted on lap 36 and the lead cycled back to Busch. During the pit cycle, Ryan Newman and Bubba Wallace were handed pass through penalties for speeding on pit road. Both served them, but Wallace was hit with a second penalty – a stop and go – for speeding while completing his pass through.

Busch drove on to win the first stage and caution flew for the first time in the race on lap 50 for the culmination of the stage. Ricky Stenhouse Jr. took the lead under the caution by opting not to pit when the leaders did.

=== Second stage ===
When the race returned to green on lap 57, Jones – on fresher tires – took the lead from Stenhouse driving down the Long Pond Straightaway. At the start/finish line the following lap, Dale Earnhardt Jr.'s engine blew up as a result of a mis-shift and transmission failure. Moments later, Clint Bowyer tagged the wall with his right-rear corner exiting Turn 1. After those two events and Busch retaking the lead on lap 62, however, the second stage continued just as the first did. It was only broken up by a cycle of green flag stops on lap 91 when Busch pitted from the lead. Teammate Denny Hamlin followed suite the subsequent lap, giving the lead to Larson. On the 96th lap, Jimmie Johnson – running seventh – suffered brake failure hurdling down the frontstretch. He turned his car down into the grass to bleed off speed, which then turned up the track and slammed the wall hard in Turn 1. Moments later, Jamie McMurray suffered a similar brake failure going into Turn 1 and also pounded the Turn 1 wall. His car continued rolling down the Long Pond Straightaway when it caught fire in the engine compartment, prompting McMurray to park it on the apron and quickly exit the burning vehicle. These two events brought out the second caution, as well as a 23-minute and 25-second red flag to facilitate cleanup.

Rather than run out the remaining four laps of the stage under caution, NASCAR decided to run a one-lap shootout to end it. It restarted on lap 99, Larson won the second stage and caution flew for the third time for the conclusion of the stage. Busch bypassed pit road under the caution, having just pitted a few laps prior, and took back the lead.

=== Final stage ===
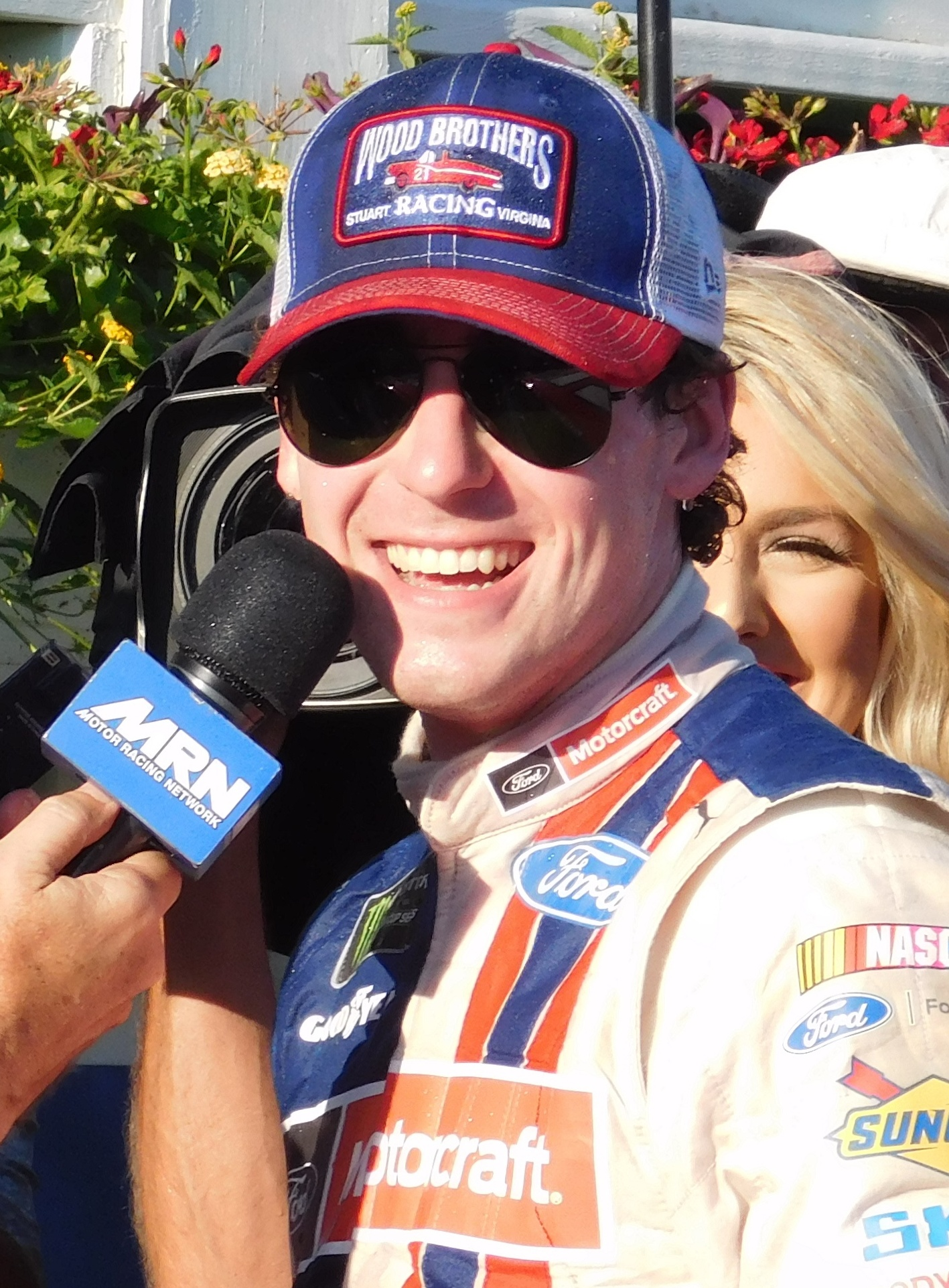
Ryan Blaney scored his first career win.

Back to green with 55 laps to go, the race settled into an orderly procession. As was the case in the first and second stage, the race was only broken up when race leader Busch commenced a cycle of green flag stops with 36 to go. Martin Truex Jr. did so as well four laps later, handing the lead to Brad Keselowski. He stayed out for 12 laps hoping to catch a caution, but didn't, pitted with 20 to go. Kasey Kahne suffered brake failure the following lap and belted the wall in Turn 1, bringing out the fourth caution. Busch opted not to pit and took the lead, as did Keselowski, while rest of the field pitted and Jones exited pit road first by taking two tires, followed by Ryan Blaney and everyone else taking 4 tires.

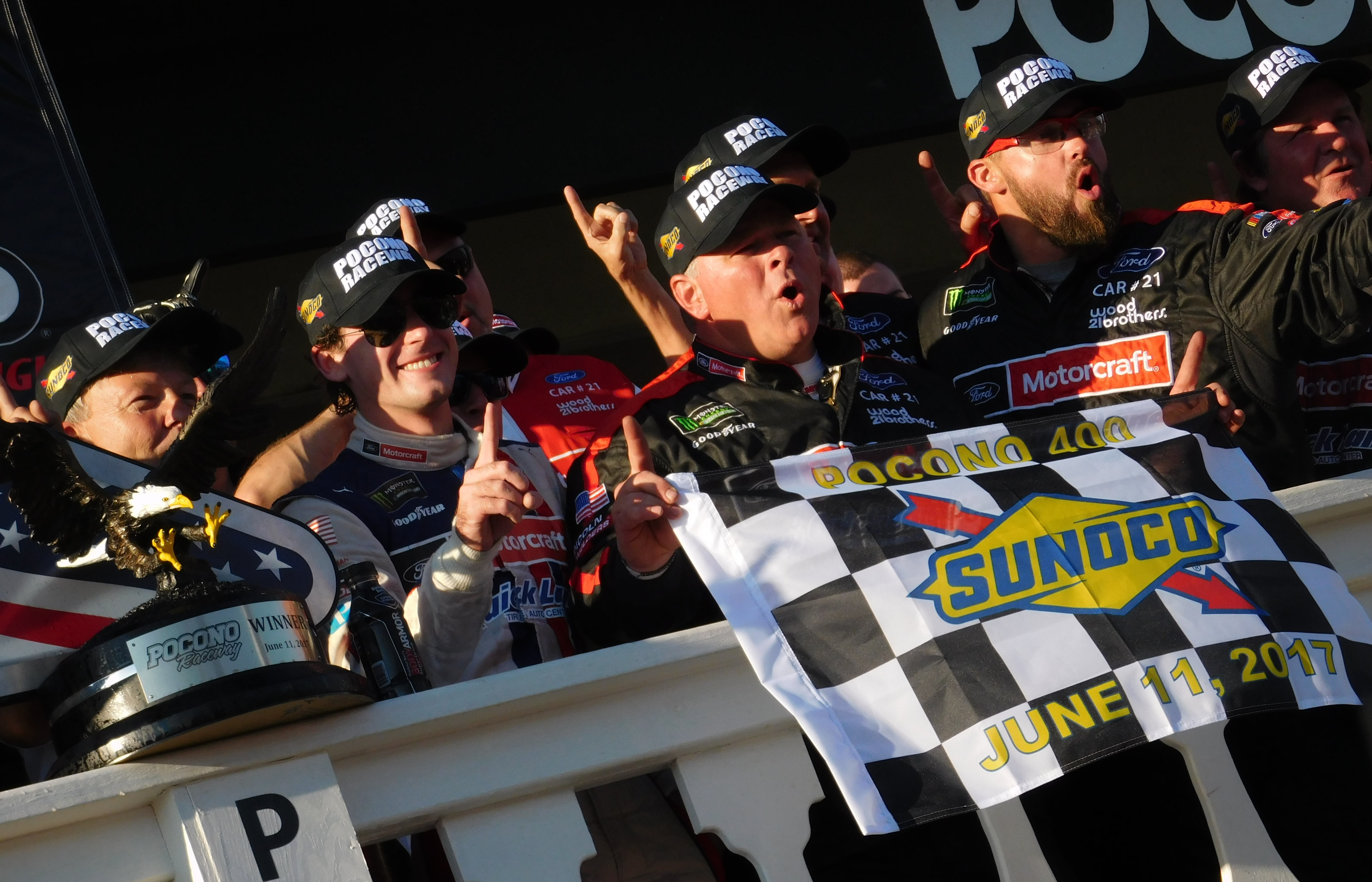
Ryan Blaney celebrating in Victory Lane after the race.

On the ensuing restart with 13 to go, Busch bolted ahead as Keselowski faltered. Blaney quickly pounced on and took second from Keselowski. Blaney on his fresher tires closed the gap to Busch on worn tires coming to 10 to go. After crossing the start/finish line, Blaney dropped down to the bottom of the track to pass to give himself the preferred groove going into Turn 1, but Busch blocked his move on the frontstretch and the battle continued. Blaney got to Busch's inside exiting Turn 1 and made contact going down the Long Pond Straightaway, even took the battle onto the apron. Blaney backed out going into Turn 2, but Busch left the bottom open, letting Blaney get back to his inside exiting Turn 2 and lost the lead to him on the Short Chute. Blaney spent the remaining nine laps holding off a charging Kevin Harvick to score his first ever victory and first for the Wood Brothers since Trevor Bayne winning the Daytona 500 in 2011.

== Race results ==
=== Stage results ===
Stage 1 Laps: 50

Pos	No	Driver	Team	Manufacturer	Points
1	18	Kyle Busch	Joe Gibbs Racing	Toyota	10
2	4	Kevin Harvick	Stewart–Haas Racing	Ford	9
3	2	Brad Keselowski	Team Penske	Ford	8
4	42	Kyle Larson	Chip Ganassi Racing	Chevrolet	7
5	48	Jimmie Johnson	Hendrick Motorsports	Chevrolet	6
6	24	Chase Elliott	Hendrick Motorsports	Chevrolet	5
7	41	Kurt Busch	Stewart–Haas Racing	Ford	4
8	20	Matt Kenseth	Joe Gibbs Racing	Toyota	3
9	1	Jamie McMurray	Chip Ganassi Racing	Chevrolet	2
10	3	Austin Dillon	Richard Childress Racing	Chevrolet	1
Official stage one results

Stage 2 Laps: 50

Pos	No	Driver	Team	Manufacturer	Points
1	42	Kyle Larson	Chip Ganassi Racing	Chevrolet	10
2	18	Kyle Busch	Joe Gibbs Racing	Toyota	9
3	78	Martin Truex Jr.	Furniture Row Racing	Toyota	8
4	4	Kevin Harvick	Stewart–Haas Racing	Ford	7
5	24	Chase Elliott	Hendrick Motorsports	Chevrolet	6
6	77	Erik Jones (R)	Furniture Row Racing	Toyota	5
7	2	Brad Keselowski	Team Penske	Ford	4
8	41	Kurt Busch	Stewart–Haas Racing	Ford	3
9	5	Kasey Kahne	Hendrick Motorsports	Chevrolet	2
10	20	Matt Kenseth	Joe Gibbs Racing	Toyota	1
Official stage two results

=== Final stage results ===
Stage 3 Laps: 60

Pos	Grid	No	Driver	Team	Manufacturer	Laps	Points
1	4	21	Ryan Blaney	Wood Brothers Racing	Ford	160	40
2	12	4	Kevin Harvick	Stewart–Haas Racing	Ford	160	51
3	15	77	Erik Jones (R)	Furniture Row Racing	Toyota	160	39
4	5	41	Kurt Busch	Stewart–Haas Racing	Ford	160	40
5	6	2	Brad Keselowski	Team Penske	Ford	160	44
6	2	78	Martin Truex Jr.	Furniture Row Racing	Toyota	160	39
7	7	42	Kyle Larson	Chip Ganassi Racing	Chevrolet	160	47
8	25	24	Chase Elliott	Hendrick Motorsports	Chevrolet	160	40
9	1	18	Kyle Busch	Joe Gibbs Racing	Toyota	160	47
10	3	20	Matt Kenseth	Joe Gibbs Racing	Toyota	160	31
11	23	17	Ricky Stenhouse Jr.	Roush Fenway Racing	Ford	160	26
12	18	11	Denny Hamlin	Joe Gibbs Racing	Toyota	160	25
13	17	3	Austin Dillon	Richard Childress Racing	Chevrolet	160	25
14	10	31	Ryan Newman	Richard Childress Racing	Chevrolet	160	23
15	14	19	Daniel Suárez (R)	Joe Gibbs Racing	Toyota	160	22
16	24	10	Danica Patrick	Stewart–Haas Racing	Ford	160	21
17	20	14	Clint Bowyer	Stewart–Haas Racing	Ford	160	20
18	27	13	Ty Dillon (R)	Germain Racing	Chevrolet	160	19
19	29	37	Chris Buescher	JTG Daugherty Racing	Chevrolet	160	18
20	13	27	Paul Menard	Richard Childress Racing	Chevrolet	160	17
21	22	6	Trevor Bayne	Roush Fenway Racing	Ford	160	16
22	21	47	A. J. Allmendinger	JTG Daugherty Racing	Chevrolet	160	15
23	9	22	Joey Logano	Team Penske	Ford	160	14
24	11	95	Michael McDowell	Leavine Family Racing	Chevrolet	160	13
25	31	38	David Ragan	Front Row Motorsports	Ford	159	12
26	16	43	Bubba Wallace (i)	Richard Petty Motorsports	Ford	159	0
27	34	34	Landon Cassill	Front Row Motorsports	Ford	158	10
28	35	83	Corey LaJoie (R)	BK Racing	Toyota	157	9
29	33	23	Gray Gaulding (R)	BK Racing	Toyota	156	8
30	32	72	Cole Whitt	TriStar Motorsports	Chevrolet	155	7
31	36	15	Reed Sorenson	Premium Motorsports	Toyota	154	6
32	30	32	Matt DiBenedetto	Go Fas Racing	Ford	153	5
33	39	55	Derrike Cope	Premium Motorsports	Chevrolet	153	4
34	37	33	Jeffrey Earnhardt	Circle Sport – The Motorsports Group	Chevrolet	146	3
35	26	5	Kasey Kahne	Hendrick Motorsports	Chevrolet	140	4
36	19	48	Jimmie Johnson	Hendrick Motorsports	Chevrolet	95	7
37	8	1	Jamie McMurray	Chip Ganassi Racing	Chevrolet	95	3
38	28	88	Dale Earnhardt Jr.	Hendrick Motorsports	Chevrolet	58	1
39	38	51	Cody Ware	Rick Ware Racing	Chevrolet	35	1
Official race results

=== Race statistics ===
- Lead changes: 9 among different drivers
- Cautions/Laps: 4 for 18
- Red flags: 1 for 23 minutes and 25 seconds
- Time of race: 2 hours, 48 minutes and 40 seconds
- Average speed: 142.292 miles per hour (228.997 km/h)

== Media ==
=== Television ===
Fox NASCAR televised the race in the United States on FS1 for the third consecutive year. Mike Joy was the lap-by-lap announcer, while six-time Pocono winner, Jeff Gordon and four-time winner Darrell Waltrip were the color commentators. Jamie Little, Chris Neville and Matt Yocum reported from pit lane during the race.

FS1 Television
Booth announcers	Pit reporters
Lap-by-lap: Mike Joy; Color-commentator: Jeff Gordon; Color commentator: Darrell Waltrip	Jamie Little; Chris Neville; Matt Yocum

=== Radio ===
Radio coverage of the race was broadcast by Motor Racing Network (MRN) and simulcasted on Sirius XM NASCAR Radio. Joe Moore, Jeff Striegle and four-time Pocono winner Rusty Wallace announced the race in the booth while the field was racing on the front stretch. Dave Moody called the race from atop a billboard outside of turn 1 when the field was racing through turn 1 while Mike Bagley called the race from a billboard outside turn 2 when the field was racing through turn 2. Kyle Rickey reported the race from a billboard outside turn 3 when the field was racing through turn 3. Alex Hayden, Winston Kelley and Steve Post reported from pit lane during the race.

MRN
Booth announcers	Turn announcers	Pit reporters
Lead announcer: Joe Moore; Announcer: Jeff Striegle; Announcer: Rusty Wallace	Turn 1: Dave Moody; Turn 2: Mike Bagley; Turn 3: Kyle Rickey	Alex Hayden; Winston Kelley; Steve Post

== Standings after the race ==
Drivers' Championship standings

	Pos	Driver	Points
	1	Martin Truex Jr.	584
	2	Kyle Larson	583 (–1)
	3	Kevin Harvick	480 (–104)
	4	Kyle Busch	463 (–121)
2	5	Brad Keselowski	454 (–130)
2	6	Chase Elliott	438 (–146)
1	7	Jimmie Johnson	421 (–163)
3	8	Jamie McMurray	418 (–166)
	9	Denny Hamlin	386 (–198)
	10	Clint Bowyer	369 (–215)
	11	Joey Logano	362 (–222)
1	12	Ryan Blaney	360 (–224)
1	13	Matt Kenseth	359 (–225)
2	14	Kurt Busch	331 (–253)
1	15	Ricky Stenhouse Jr.	325 (–259)
1	16	Ryan Newman	322 (–262)
Official driver's standings

Manufacturers' Championship standings

Pos	Manufacturer	Points
1	Chevrolet	505
2	Ford	499 (–6)
3	Toyota	478 (–27)
Official manufacturers' standings

- Note: Only the first 16 positions are included for the driver standings.
- . – Driver has clinched a position in the Monster Energy NASCAR Cup Series playoffs.

Previous race: 2017 AAA 400 Drive for Autism	Monster Energy NASCAR Cup Series; 2017 season	Next race: 2017 FireKeepers Casino 400
