= 2017 Federated Auto Parts 400 =

Race details
- Race 26 of 36 in the 2017 Monster Energy NASCAR Cup Series
- Date: September 9, 2017
- Location: Richmond Raceway in Richmond, Virginia
- Course: Permanent racing facility
- Course length: 0.750 miles (1.207 km)
- Distance: 404 laps, 303 mi (487.631 km)
- Scheduled distance: 400 laps, 300 mi (482.803 km)
- Average speed: 99.417 miles per hour (159.996 km/h)

Pole position
Driver	Matt Kenseth	Joe Gibbs Racing
- Time: 22.055

Most laps led
Driver	Martin Truex Jr.	Furniture Row Racing
- Laps: 198

Winner
No. 42	Kyle Larson	Chip Ganassi Racing

Television in the United States
- Network: NBCSN
- Announcers: Rick Allen, Jeff Burton and Steve Letarte

Radio in the United States
- Radio: MRN
- Booth announcers: Jeff Striegle, Kurt Becker and Rusty Wallace
- Turn announcers: Dave Moody (Backstretch)

The 2017 Federated Auto Parts 400, was a Monster Energy NASCAR Cup Series race held on September 9, 2017 at Richmond Raceway in Richmond, Virginia. Contested over 404 laps—extended from 400 laps due to an overtime finish, on the .75-mile (1.21 km) D-shaped short track, it was the 26th race of the 2017 Monster Energy NASCAR Cup Series season, and the final race of the regular season before the playoffs.

== Entry list ==
No.	Driver	Team	Manufacturer
1	Jamie McMurray	Chip Ganassi Racing	Chevrolet
2	Brad Keselowski	Team Penske	Ford
3	Austin Dillon	Richard Childress Racing	Chevrolet
4	Kevin Harvick	Stewart–Haas Racing	Ford
5	Kasey Kahne	Hendrick Motorsports	Chevrolet
6	Trevor Bayne	Roush Fenway Racing	Ford
10	Danica Patrick	Stewart–Haas Racing	Ford
11	Denny Hamlin	Joe Gibbs Racing	Toyota
13	Ty Dillon (R)	Germain Racing	Chevrolet
14	Clint Bowyer	Stewart–Haas Racing	Ford
15	Derrike Cope	Premium Motorsports	Chevrolet
17	Ricky Stenhouse Jr.	Roush Fenway Racing	Ford
18	Kyle Busch	Joe Gibbs Racing	Toyota
19	Daniel Suárez (R)	Joe Gibbs Racing	Toyota
20	Matt Kenseth	Joe Gibbs Racing	Toyota
21	Ryan Blaney	Wood Brothers Racing	Ford
22	Joey Logano	Team Penske	Ford
23	Gray Gaulding (R)	BK Racing	Toyota
24	Chase Elliott	Hendrick Motorsports	Chevrolet
27	Paul Menard	Richard Childress Racing	Chevrolet
31	Ryan Newman	Richard Childress Racing	Chevrolet
32	Matt DiBenedetto	Go Fas Racing	Ford
33	Jeffrey Earnhardt	Circle Sport – The Motorsports Group	Chevrolet
34	Landon Cassill	Front Row Motorsports	Ford
37	Chris Buescher	JTG Daugherty Racing	Chevrolet
38	David Ragan	Front Row Motorsports	Ford
41	Kurt Busch	Stewart–Haas Racing	Ford
42	Kyle Larson	Chip Ganassi Racing	Chevrolet
43	Aric Almirola	Richard Petty Motorsports	Ford
47	A. J. Allmendinger	JTG Daugherty Racing	Chevrolet
48	Jimmie Johnson	Hendrick Motorsports	Chevrolet
51	B. J. McLeod (i)	Rick Ware Racing	Chevrolet
55	Reed Sorenson	Premium Motorsports	Chevrolet
72	Cole Whitt	TriStar Motorsports	Chevrolet
77	Erik Jones (R)	Furniture Row Racing	Toyota
78	Martin Truex Jr.	Furniture Row Racing	Toyota
83	Corey LaJoie (R)	BK Racing	Toyota
88	Dale Earnhardt Jr.	Hendrick Motorsports	Chevrolet
95	Michael McDowell	Leavine Family Racing	Chevrolet
Official entry list

== Practice ==
=== First practice ===
Matt Kenseth was the fastest in the first practice session with a time of 22.333 seconds and a speed of 120.897 mph (194.565 km/h).

Pos	No.	Driver	Team	Manufacturer	Time	Speed
1	20	Matt Kenseth	Joe Gibbs Racing	Toyota	22.333	120.897
2	78	Martin Truex Jr.	Furniture Row Racing	Toyota	22.333	120.897
3	18	Kyle Busch	Joe Gibbs Racing	Toyota	22.421	120.423
Official first practice results

=== Final practice ===
Kyle Larson was the fastest in the final practice session with a time of 22.456 seconds and a speed of 120.235 mph (193.499 km/h).

Pos	No.	Driver	Team	Manufacturer	Time	Speed
1	42	Kyle Larson	Chip Ganassi Racing	Chevrolet	22.456	120.235
2	22	Joey Logano	Team Penske	Ford	22.461	120.208
3	19	Daniel Suárez (R)	Joe Gibbs Racing	Toyota	22.514	119.925
Official final practice results

== Qualifying ==
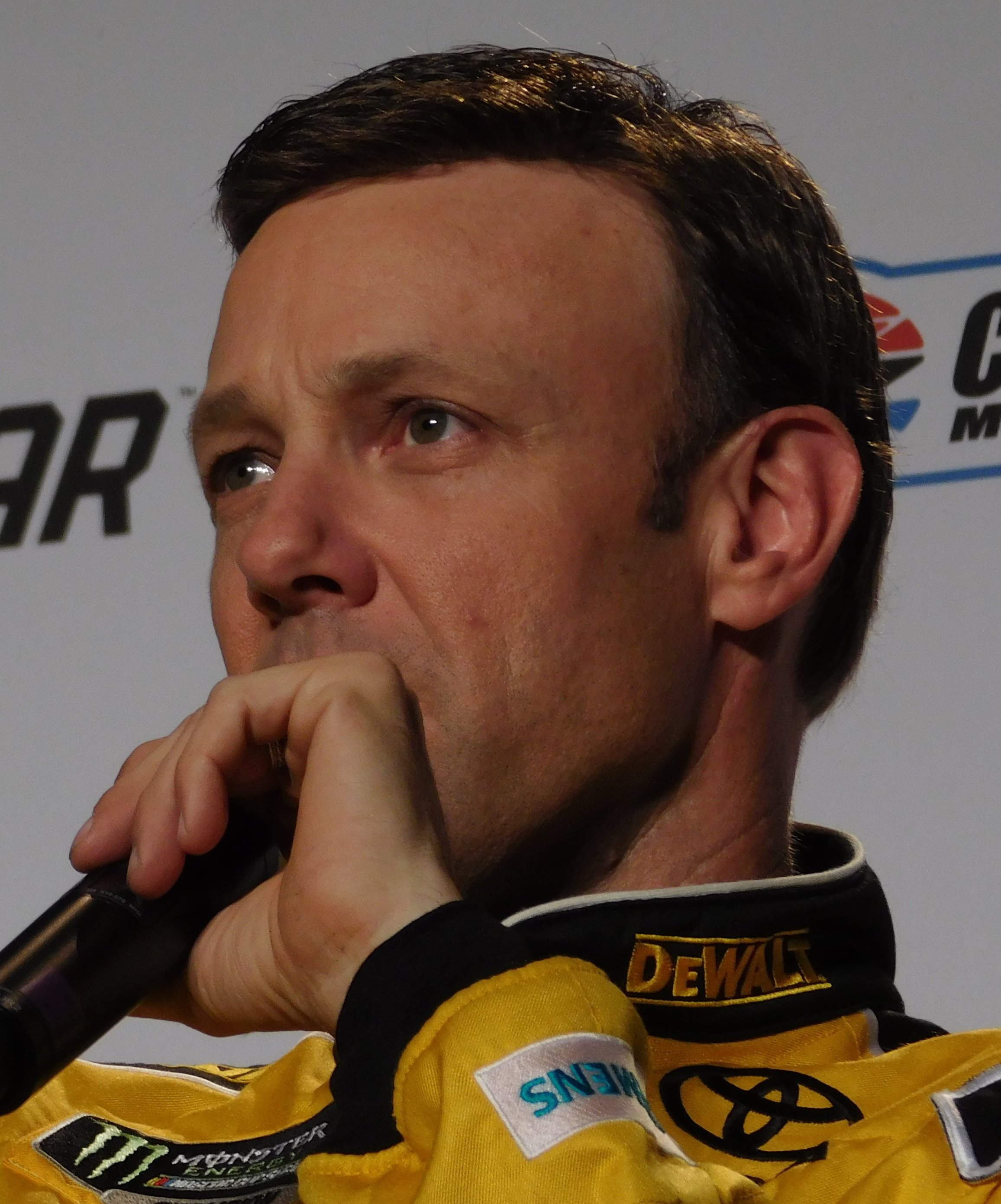
Matt Kenseth won the pole.

Matt Kenseth scored the pole for the race with a time of 22.055 and a speed of 122.421 mph (197.018 km/h).

=== Qualifying results ===
Pos	No.	Driver	Team	Manufacturer	R1	R2	R3
1	20	Matt Kenseth	Joe Gibbs Racing	Toyota	21.893	21.961	22.055
2	11	Denny Hamlin	Joe Gibbs Racing	Toyota	22.001	22.079	22.081
3	41	Kurt Busch	Stewart–Haas Racing	Ford	21.947	21.945	22.083
4	42	Kyle Larson	Chip Ganassi Racing	Chevrolet	21.884	22.043	22.130
5	78	Martin Truex Jr.	Furniture Row Racing	Toyota	22.030	21.943	22.134
6	4	Kevin Harvick	Stewart–Haas Racing	Ford	21.962	22.153	22.179
7	18	Kyle Busch	Joe Gibbs Racing	Toyota	21.946	22.070	22.217
8	17	Ricky Stenhouse Jr.	Roush Fenway Racing	Ford	21.937	22.138	22.221
9	24	Chase Elliott	Hendrick Motorsports	Chevrolet	22.151	22.125	22.227
10	77	Erik Jones (R)	Furniture Row Racing	Toyota	22.164	22.089	22.251
11	1	Jamie McMurray	Chip Ganassi Racing	Chevrolet	22.113	22.087	22.291
12	22	Joey Logano	Team Penske	Ford	21.909	22.128	22.325
13	14	Clint Bowyer	Stewart–Haas Racing	Ford	22.040	22.154	—
14	21	Ryan Blaney	Wood Brothers Racing	Ford	22.059	22.172	—
15	2	Brad Keselowski	Team Penske	Ford	22.141	22.181	—
16	19	Daniel Suárez (R)	Joe Gibbs Racing	Toyota	21.941	22.181	—
17	5	Kasey Kahne	Hendrick Motorsports	Chevrolet	22.153	22.209	—
18	6	Trevor Bayne	Roush Fenway Racing	Ford	21.989	22.212	—
19	10	Danica Patrick	Stewart–Haas Racing	Ford	22.046	22.277	—
20	48	Jimmie Johnson	Hendrick Motorsports	Chevrolet	21.944	22.287	—
21	88	Dale Earnhardt Jr.	Hendrick Motorsports	Chevrolet	22.171	22.302	—
22	47	A. J. Allmendinger	JTG Daugherty Racing	Chevrolet	22.143	22.352	—
23	43	Aric Almirola	Richard Petty Motorsports	Ford	22.139	22.424	—
24	37	Chris Buescher	JTG Daugherty Racing	Chevrolet	22.092	22.465	—
25	32	Matt DiBenedetto	Go Fas Racing	Ford	22.194	—	—
26	27	Paul Menard	Richard Childress Racing	Chevrolet	22.201	—	—
27	31	Ryan Newman	Richard Childress Racing	Chevrolet	22.204	—	—
28	95	Michael McDowell	Leavine Family Racing	Chevrolet	22.242	—	—
29	38	David Ragan	Front Row Motorsports	Ford	22.242	—	—
30	34	Landon Cassill	Front Row Motorsports	Ford	22.248	—	—
31	3	Austin Dillon	Richard Childress Racing	Chevrolet	22.266	—	—
32	13	Ty Dillon (R)	Germain Racing	Chevrolet	22.294	—	—
33	83	Corey LaJoie (R)	BK Racing	Toyota	22.363	—	—
34	23	Gray Gaulding (R)	BK Racing	Toyota	22.466	—	—
35	72	Cole Whitt	TriStar Motorsports	Chevrolet	22.468	—	—
36	55	Reed Sorenson	Premium Motorsports	Chevrolet	22.477	—	—
37	33	Jeffrey Earnhardt	Circle Sport – The Motorsports Group	Chevrolet	22.554	—	—
38	15	Derrike Cope	Premium Motorsports	Chevrolet	22.850	—	—
39	51	B. J. McLeod (i)	Rick Ware Racing	Chevrolet	23.090	—	—
Official qualifying results

== Race ==
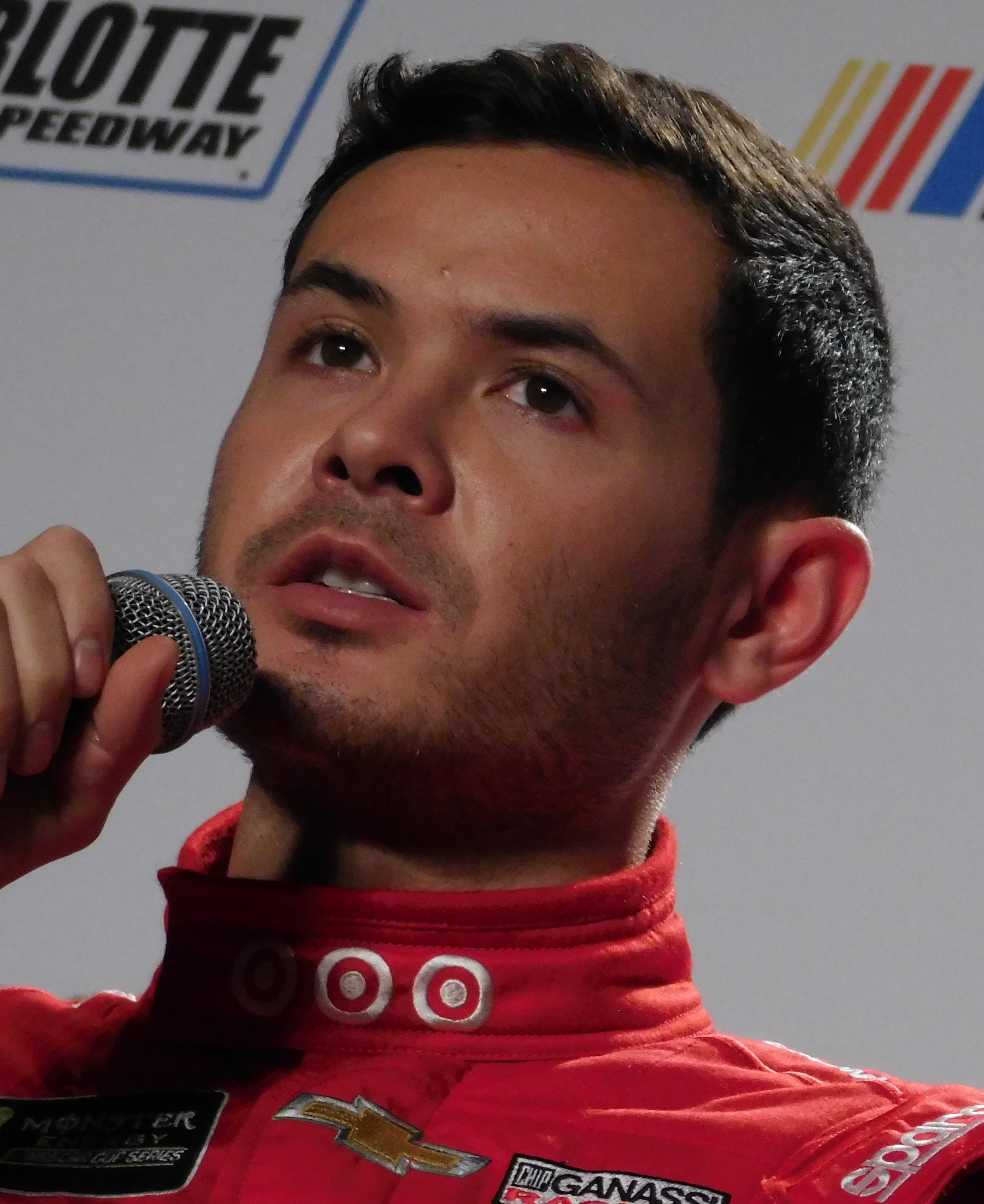
Kyle Larson won the race.

=== Race results ===
==== Stage results ====
Stage 1 Laps: 100

Pos	No	Driver	Team	Manufacturer	Points
1	18	Kyle Busch	Joe Gibbs Racing	Toyota	10
2	42	Kyle Larson	Chip Ganassi Racing	Chevrolet	9
3	14	Clint Bowyer	Stewart–Haas Racing	Ford	8
4	20	Matt Kenseth	Joe Gibbs Racing	Toyota	7
5	78	Martin Truex Jr.	Furniture Row Racing	Toyota	6
6	22	Joey Logano	Team Penske	Ford	5
7	77	Erik Jones (R)	Furniture Row Racing	Toyota	4
8	4	Kevin Harvick	Stewart–Haas Racing	Ford	3
9	24	Chase Elliott	Hendrick Motorsports	Chevrolet	2
10	41	Kurt Busch	Stewart–Haas Racing	Ford	1
Official stage one results

Stage 2 Laps: 100

Pos	No	Driver	Team	Manufacturer	Points
1	78	Martin Truex Jr.	Furniture Row Racing	Toyota	10
2	20	Matt Kenseth	Joe Gibbs Racing	Toyota	9
3	77	Erik Jones (R)	Furniture Row Racing	Toyota	8
4	22	Joey Logano	Team Penske	Ford	7
5	2	Brad Keselowski	Team Penske	Ford	6
6	42	Kyle Larson	Chip Ganassi Racing	Chevrolet	5
7	88	Dale Earnhardt Jr.	Hendrick Motorsports	Chevrolet	4
8	41	Kurt Busch	Stewart–Haas Racing	Ford	3
9	31	Ryan Newman	Richard Childress Racing	Chevrolet	2
10	18	Kyle Busch	Joe Gibbs Racing	Toyota	1
Official stage two results

=== Final stage results ===
Stage 3 Laps: 204

Pos	Grid	No	Driver	Team	Manufacturer	Laps	Points
1	4	42	Kyle Larson	Chip Ganassi Racing	Chevrolet	404	54
2	12	22	Joey Logano	Team Penske	Ford	404	47
3	27	31	Ryan Newman	Richard Childress Racing	Chevrolet	404	36
4	3	41	Kurt Busch	Stewart–Haas Racing	Ford	404	37
5	2	11	Denny Hamlin	Joe Gibbs Racing	Toyota	404	32
6	10	77	Erik Jones (R)	Furniture Row Racing	Toyota	404	43
7	16	19	Daniel Suárez (R)	Joe Gibbs Racing	Toyota	404	30
8	20	48	Jimmie Johnson	Hendrick Motorsports	Chevrolet	404	29
9	7	18	Kyle Busch	Joe Gibbs Racing	Toyota	404	39
10	9	24	Chase Elliott	Hendrick Motorsports	Chevrolet	404	29
11	15	2	Brad Keselowski	Team Penske	Ford	404	32
12	17	5	Kasey Kahne	Hendrick Motorsports	Chevrolet	404	25
13	21	88	Dale Earnhardt Jr.	Hendrick Motorsports	Chevrolet	404	28
14	11	1	Jamie McMurray	Chip Ganassi Racing	Chevrolet	404	23
15	6	4	Kevin Harvick	Stewart–Haas Racing	Ford	404	25
16	28	95	Michael McDowell	Leavine Family Racing	Chevrolet	404	21
17	23	43	Aric Almirola	Richard Petty Motorsports	Ford	404	20
18	14	21	Ryan Blaney	Wood Brothers Racing	Ford	404	19
19	8	17	Ricky Stenhouse Jr.	Roush Fenway Racing	Ford	404	18
20	5	78	Martin Truex Jr.	Furniture Row Racing	Toyota	403	33
21	31	3	Austin Dillon	Richard Childress Racing	Chevrolet	403	16
22	32	13	Ty Dillon (R)	Germain Racing	Chevrolet	403	15
23	19	10	Danica Patrick	Stewart–Haas Racing	Ford	403	14
24	13	14	Clint Bowyer	Stewart–Haas Racing	Ford	403	21
25	18	6	Trevor Bayne	Roush Fenway Racing	Ford	402	12
26	22	47	A. J. Allmendinger	JTG Daugherty Racing	Chevrolet	402	11
27	29	38	David Ragan	Front Row Motorsports	Ford	402	10
28	26	27	Paul Menard	Richard Childress Racing	Chevrolet	402	9
29	33	83	Corey LaJoie (R)	BK Racing	Toyota	400	8
30	36	55	Reed Sorenson	Premium Motorsports	Chevrolet	400	7
31	25	32	Matt DiBenedetto	Go Fas Racing	Ford	400	6
32	24	37	Chris Buescher	JTG Daugherty Racing	Chevrolet	400	5
33	35	72	Cole Whitt	TriStar Motorsports	Chevrolet	396	4
34	37	33	Jeffrey Earnhardt	Circle Sport – The Motorsports Group	Chevrolet	395	3
35	34	23	Gray Gaulding (R)	BK Racing	Toyota	393	2
36	38	15	Derrike Cope	Premium Motorsports	Chevrolet	388	1
37	39	51	B. J. McLeod (i)	Rick Ware Racing	Chevrolet	318	0
38	1	20	Matt Kenseth	Joe Gibbs Racing	Toyota	257	17
39	30	34	Landon Cassill	Front Row Motorsports	Ford	33	1
Official race results

=== Race statistics ===
- Lead changes: 7 among different drivers
- Cautions/Laps: 7 for 38
- Red flags: 0
- Time of race: 3 hours, 2 minutes and 52 seconds
- Average speed: 99.417 miles per hour (159.996 km/h)

== Media ==
=== Television ===
NBC Sports covered the race on the television side. Rick Allen, Jeff Burton and Steve Letarte had the call in the booth for the race. Dave Burns, Parker Kligerman, Marty Snider and Kelli Stavast reported from pit lane during the race.

NBCSN
Booth announcers	Pit reporters
Lap-by-lap: Rick Allen; Color-commentator: Jeff Burton; Color-commentator: Steve Letarte	Dave Burns; Parker Kligerman; Marty Snider; Kelli Stavast

=== Radio ===
The Motor Racing Network had the radio call for the race, which was simulcast on Sirius XM NASCAR Radio.

MRN
Booth announcers	Turn announcers	Pit reporters
Lead announcer: Jeff Striegle; Announcer: Kurt Becker; Announcer: Rusty Wallace	Backstretch: Dave Moody	Alex Hayden; Winston Kelley; Steve Post

== Standings after the race ==
Drivers' Championship standings after Playoffs reset

	Pos	Driver	Points
	1	Martin Truex Jr.	2,053
1	2	Kyle Larson	2,033 (–20)
1	3	Kyle Busch	2,029 (–24)
2	4	Brad Keselowski	2,019 (–34)
5	5	Jimmie Johnson	2,017 (–36)
2	6	Kevin Harvick	2,015 (–38)
2	7	Denny Hamlin	2,013 (–40)
10	8	Ricky Stenhouse Jr.	2,010 (–43)
3	9	Ryan Blaney	2,008 (–45)
3	10	Chase Elliott	2,006 (–47)
5	11	Ryan Newman	2,005 (–48)
1	12	Kurt Busch	2,005 (–48)
8	13	Kasey Kahne	2,005 (–48)
5	14	Austin Dillon	2,005 (–48)
7	15	Matt Kenseth	2,005 (–48)
7	16	Jamie McMurray	2,003 (–50)
Official driver's standings

Manufacturers' Championship standings

	Pos	Manufacturer	Points
1	1	Chevrolet	918
1	2	Toyota	911 (–7)
	3	Ford	909 (–9)
Official manufacturers' standings

- Note: Only the first 16 positions are included for the driver standings.

Previous race: 2017 Bojangles' Southern 500	Monster Energy NASCAR Cup Series; 2017 season	Next race: 2017 Tales of the Turtles 400
