= 2017 Tales of the Turtles 400 =

NASCAR auto race in Illinois, U.S., 2017

Race details
- Race 27 of 36 in the 2017 Monster Energy NASCAR Cup Series
- Date: September 17, 2017
- Location: Chicagoland Speedway in Joliet, Illinois
- Course: Permanent racing facility
- Course length: 1.5 miles (2.4 km)
- Distance: 267 laps, 400.5 mi (640.8 km)
- Average speed: 145.401 miles per hour (234.000 km/h)

Pole position
Driver	Kyle Busch	Joe Gibbs Racing
- Time: 28.729

Most laps led
Driver	Kyle Busch	Joe Gibbs Racing
- Laps: 85

Winner
No. 78	Martin Truex Jr.	Furniture Row Racing

Television in the United States
- Network: NBCSN
- Announcers: Rick Allen, Jeff Burton and Steve Letarte

Radio in the United States
- Radio: MRN
- Booth announcers: Joe Moore, Jeff Striegle and Rusty Wallace
- Turn announcers: Dave Moody (1 & 2) and Mike Bagley (3 & 4)

The 2017 Tales of the Turtles 400 was a Monster Energy NASCAR Cup Series race held on September 17, 2017, at Chicagoland Speedway in Joliet, Illinois. Contested over 267 laps on the 1.5-mile (2.4 km) intermediate speedway, it was the 27th race of the 2017 Monster Energy NASCAR Cup Series season, the first race of the Playoffs, and the first race of the Round of 16.

== Entry list ==
No.	Driver	Team	Manufacturer
1	Jamie McMurray	Chip Ganassi Racing	Chevrolet
2	Brad Keselowski	Team Penske	Ford
3	Austin Dillon	Richard Childress Racing	Chevrolet
4	Kevin Harvick	Stewart–Haas Racing	Ford
5	Kasey Kahne	Hendrick Motorsports	Chevrolet
6	Trevor Bayne	Roush Fenway Racing	Ford
10	Danica Patrick	Stewart–Haas Racing	Ford
11	Denny Hamlin	Joe Gibbs Racing	Toyota
13	Ty Dillon (R)	Germain Racing	Chevrolet
14	Clint Bowyer	Stewart–Haas Racing	Ford
15	Reed Sorenson	Premium Motorsports	Chevrolet
17	Ricky Stenhouse Jr.	Roush Fenway Racing	Ford
18	Kyle Busch	Joe Gibbs Racing	Toyota
19	Daniel Suárez (R)	Joe Gibbs Racing	Toyota
20	Matt Kenseth	Joe Gibbs Racing	Toyota
21	Ryan Blaney	Wood Brothers Racing	Ford
22	Joey Logano	Team Penske	Ford
23	Corey LaJoie (R)	BK Racing	Toyota
24	Chase Elliott	Hendrick Motorsports	Chevrolet
27	Paul Menard	Richard Childress Racing	Chevrolet
31	Ryan Newman	Richard Childress Racing	Chevrolet
32	Matt DiBenedetto	Go Fas Racing	Ford
33	Jeffrey Earnhardt	Circle Sport – The Motorsports Group	Chevrolet
34	Landon Cassill	Front Row Motorsports	Ford
37	Chris Buescher	JTG Daugherty Racing	Chevrolet
38	David Ragan	Front Row Motorsports	Ford
41	Kurt Busch	Stewart–Haas Racing	Ford
42	Kyle Larson	Chip Ganassi Racing	Chevrolet
43	Aric Almirola	Richard Petty Motorsports	Ford
47	A. J. Allmendinger	JTG Daugherty Racing	Chevrolet
48	Jimmie Johnson	Hendrick Motorsports	Chevrolet
51	Ray Black Jr. (i)	Rick Ware Racing	Chevrolet
55	Gray Gaulding (R)	Premium Motorsports	Toyota
66	Timmy Hill (i)	MBM Motorsports	Chevrolet
72	Cole Whitt	TriStar Motorsports	Chevrolet
77	Erik Jones (R)	Furniture Row Racing	Toyota
78	Martin Truex Jr.	Furniture Row Racing	Toyota
83	Brett Moffitt (i)	BK Racing	Toyota
88	Dale Earnhardt Jr.	Hendrick Motorsports	Chevrolet
95	Michael McDowell	Leavine Family Racing	Chevrolet
Official entry list

== Practice ==
=== First practice ===
Kyle Busch was the fastest in the first practice session with a time of 29.325 seconds and a speed of 184.143 mph (296.349 km/h).

Pos	No.	Driver	Team	Manufacturer	Time	Speed
1	18	Kyle Busch	Joe Gibbs Racing	Toyota	29.325	184.143
2	19	Daniel Suárez (R)	Joe Gibbs Racing	Toyota	29.441	183.418
3	11	Denny Hamlin	Joe Gibbs Racing	Toyota	29.521	182.921
Official first practice results

=== Second practice ===
Martin Truex Jr. was the fastest in the second practice session with a time of 29.892 seconds and a speed of 180.650 mph (290.728 km/h).

Pos	No.	Driver	Team	Manufacturer	Time	Speed
1	78	Martin Truex Jr.	Furniture Row Racing	Toyota	29.892	180.650
2	21	Ryan Blaney	Wood Brothers Racing	Ford	30.033	179.802
3	24	Chase Elliott	Hendrick Motorsports	Chevrolet	30.052	179.689
Official second practice results

=== Final practice ===
Kyle Busch was the fastest in the final practice session with a time of 29.958 seconds and a speed of 180.252 mph (290.087 km/h).

Pos	No.	Driver	Team	Manufacturer	Time	Speed
1	18	Kyle Busch	Joe Gibbs Racing	Toyota	29.958	180.252
2	3	Austin Dillon	Richard Childress Racing	Chevrolet	30.094	179.438
3	2	Brad Keselowski	Team Penske	Ford	30.119	179.289
Official final practice results

== Qualifying ==
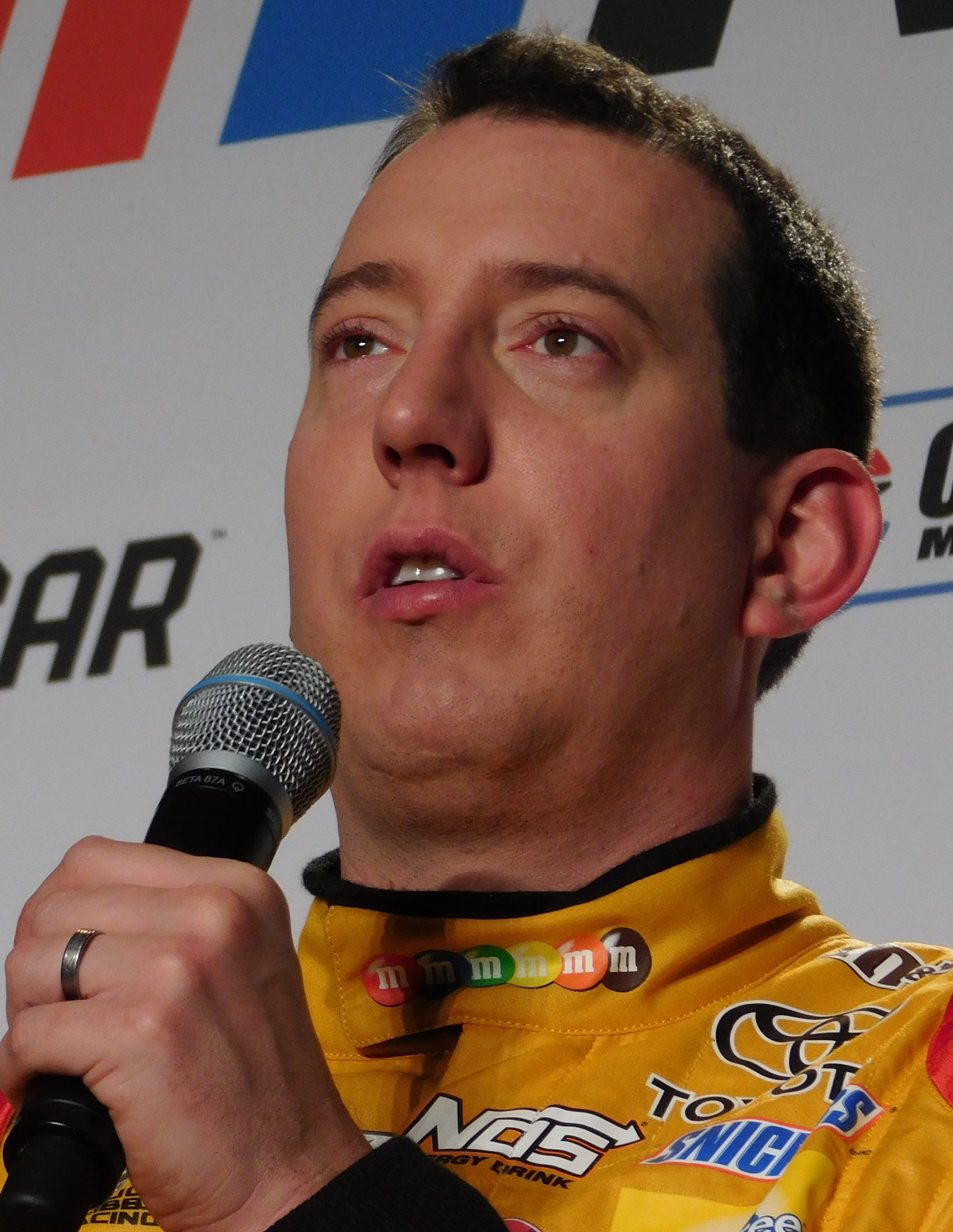
Kyle Busch scored the pole position.

Kyle Busch scored the pole for the race with a time of 28.729 and a speed of 187.963 mph (302.497 km/h).

=== Qualifying results ===
Pos	No.	Driver	Team	Manufacturer	R1	R2	R3
1	18	Kyle Busch	Joe Gibbs Racing	Toyota	29.052	29.071	28.729
2	11	Denny Hamlin	Joe Gibbs Racing	Toyota	29.457	29.191	29.006
3	78	Martin Truex Jr.	Furniture Row Racing	Toyota	29.474	29.092	29.049
4	4	Kevin Harvick	Stewart–Haas Racing	Ford	29.173	29.172	29.086
5	2	Brad Keselowski	Team Penske	Ford	29.339	29.190	29.152
6	42	Kyle Larson	Chip Ganassi Racing	Chevrolet	29.172	29.217	29.176
7	22	Joey Logano	Team Penske	Ford	29.370	29.136	29.177
8	24	Chase Elliott	Hendrick Motorsports	Chevrolet	29.235	29.184	29.179
9	3	Austin Dillon	Richard Childress Racing	Chevrolet	29.281	29.083	29.183
10	20	Matt Kenseth	Joe Gibbs Racing	Toyota	29.093	29.205	29.344
11	14	Clint Bowyer	Stewart–Haas Racing	Ford	29.418	29.163	29.356
12	21	Ryan Blaney	Wood Brothers Racing	Ford	29.204	29.166	0.000
13	19	Daniel Suárez (R)	Joe Gibbs Racing	Toyota	29.418	29.246	—
14	48	Jimmie Johnson	Hendrick Motorsports	Chevrolet	29.585	29.282	—
15	17	Ricky Stenhouse Jr.	Roush Fenway Racing	Ford	29.623	29.296	—
16	31	Ryan Newman	Richard Childress Racing	Chevrolet	29.369	29.303	—
17	41	Kurt Busch	Stewart–Haas Racing	Ford	29.524	29.368	—
18	37	Chris Buescher	JTG Daugherty Racing	Chevrolet	29.635	29.471	—
19	1	Jamie McMurray	Chip Ganassi Racing	Chevrolet	29.383	29.513	—
20	88	Dale Earnhardt Jr.	Hendrick Motorsports	Chevrolet	29.610	29.522	—
21	43	Aric Almirola	Richard Petty Motorsports	Ford	29.592	29.552	—
22	10	Danica Patrick	Stewart–Haas Racing	Ford	29.374	29.565	—
23	13	Ty Dillon (R)	Germain Racing	Chevrolet	29.627	29.716	—
24	77	Erik Jones (R)	Furniture Row Racing	Toyota	29.232	0.000	—
25	5	Kasey Kahne	Hendrick Motorsports	Chevrolet	29.686	—	—
26	6	Trevor Bayne	Roush Fenway Racing	Ford	29.724	—	—
27	34	Landon Cassill	Front Row Motorsports	Ford	29.726	—	—
28	27	Paul Menard	Richard Childress Racing	Chevrolet	29.766	—	—
29	47	A. J. Allmendinger	JTG Daugherty Racing	Chevrolet	29.774	—	—
30	95	Michael McDowell	Leavine Family Racing	Chevrolet	29.779	—	—
31	38	David Ragan	Front Row Motorsports	Ford	29.879	—	—
32	32	Matt DiBenedetto	Go Fas Racing	Ford	30.059	—	—
33	23	Corey LaJoie (R)	BK Racing	Toyota	30.128	—	—
34	15	Reed Sorenson	Premium Motorsports	Chevrolet	30.555	—	—
35	72	Cole Whitt	TriStar Motorsports	Chevrolet	30.586	—	—
36	55	Gray Gaulding (R)	Premium Motorsports	Toyota	30.608	—	—
37	33	Jeffrey Earnhardt	Circle Sport – The Motorsports Group	Chevrolet	30.818	—	—
38	66	Timmy Hill (i)	MBM Motorsports	Chevrolet	30.988	—	—
39	51	Ray Black Jr. (i)	Rick Ware Racing	Chevrolet	31.724	—	—
40	83	Brett Moffitt (i)	BK Racing	Toyota	0.000	—	—
Official qualifying results

== Race ==
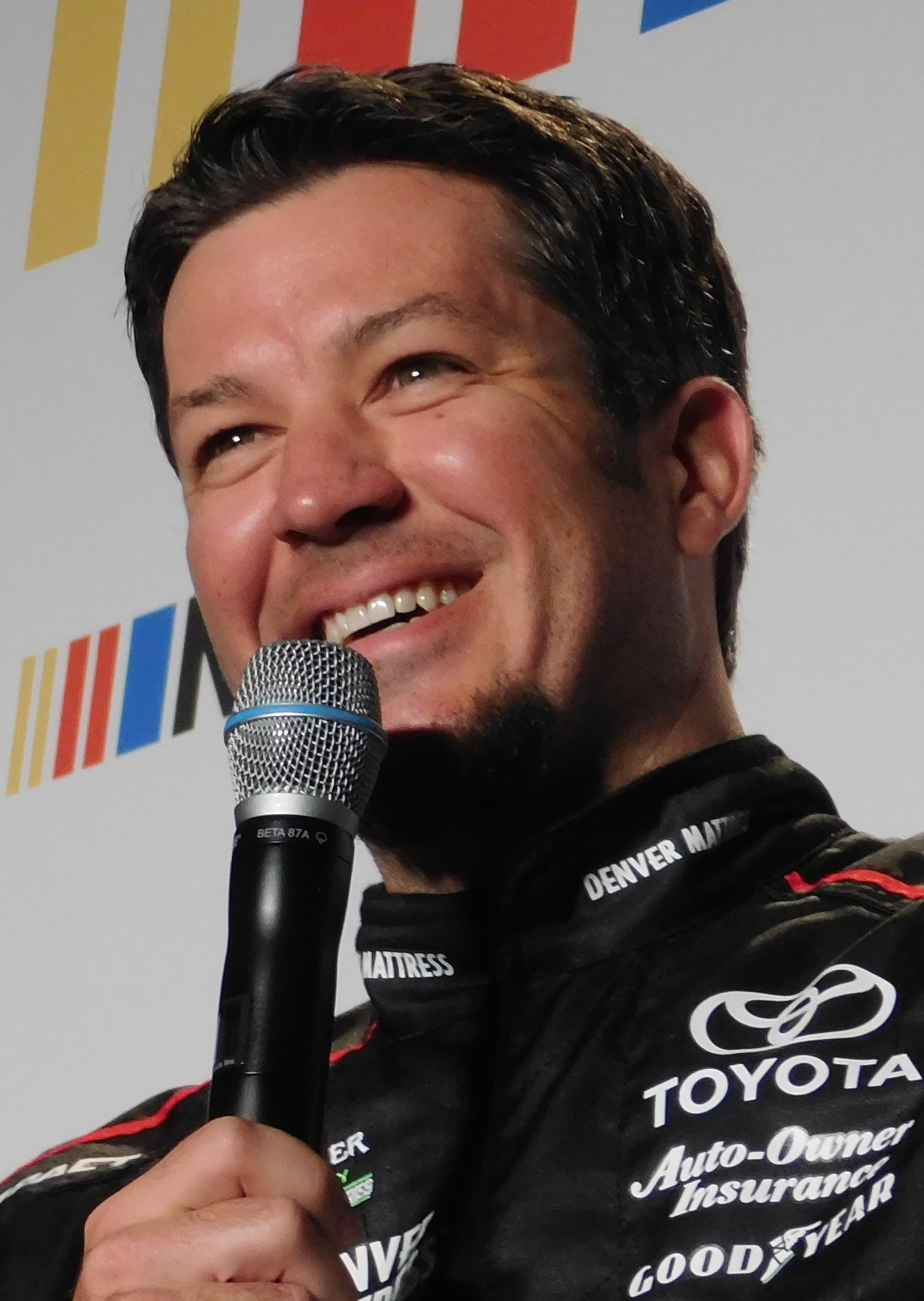
Martin Truex Jr. won the race.

=== Race results ===
==== Stage results ====
Stage 1 Laps: 80

Pos	No	Driver	Team	Manufacturer	Points
1	18	Kyle Busch	Joe Gibbs Racing	Toyota	10
2	4	Kevin Harvick	Stewart–Haas Racing	Ford	9
3	24	Chase Elliott	Hendrick Motorsports	Chevrolet	8
4	11	Denny Hamlin	Joe Gibbs Racing	Toyota	7
5	22	Joey Logano	Team Penske	Ford	6
6	2	Brad Keselowski	Team Penske	Ford	5
7	20	Matt Kenseth	Joe Gibbs Racing	Toyota	4
8	42	Kyle Larson	Chip Ganassi Racing	Chevrolet	3
9	19	Daniel Suárez (R)	Joe Gibbs Racing	Toyota	2
10	78	Martin Truex Jr.	Furniture Row Racing	Toyota	1
Official stage one results

Stage 2 Laps: 80

Pos	No	Driver	Team	Manufacturer	Points
1	24	Chase Elliott	Hendrick Motorsports	Chevrolet	10
2	4	Kevin Harvick	Stewart–Haas Racing	Ford	9
3	78	Martin Truex Jr.	Furniture Row Racing	Toyota	8
4	42	Kyle Larson	Chip Ganassi Racing	Chevrolet	7
5	2	Brad Keselowski	Team Penske	Ford	6
6	11	Denny Hamlin	Joe Gibbs Racing	Toyota	5
7	22	Joey Logano	Team Penske	Ford	4
8	41	Kurt Busch	Stewart–Haas Racing	Ford	3
9	20	Matt Kenseth	Joe Gibbs Racing	Toyota	2
10	1	Jamie McMurray	Chip Ganassi Racing	Chevrolet	1
Official stage two results

=== Final stage results ===
Stage 3 Laps: 107

Pos	Grid	No	Driver	Team	Manufacturer	Laps	Points
1	3	78	Martin Truex Jr.	Furniture Row Racing	Toyota	267	49
2	8	24	Chase Elliott	Hendrick Motorsports	Chevrolet	267	53
3	4	4	Kevin Harvick	Stewart–Haas Racing	Ford	267	52
4	2	11	Denny Hamlin	Joe Gibbs Racing	Toyota	267	45
5	6	42	Kyle Larson	Chip Ganassi Racing	Chevrolet	267	42
6	5	2	Brad Keselowski	Team Penske	Ford	267	42
7	7	22	Joey Logano	Team Penske	Ford	267	40
8	14	48	Jimmie Johnson	Hendrick Motorsports	Chevrolet	267	29
9	10	20	Matt Kenseth	Joe Gibbs Racing	Toyota	267	34
10	19	1	Jamie McMurray	Chip Ganassi Racing	Chevrolet	267	28
11	12	21	Ryan Blaney	Wood Brothers Racing	Ford	267	26
12	13	19	Daniel Suárez (R)	Joe Gibbs Racing	Toyota	267	27
13	11	14	Clint Bowyer	Stewart–Haas Racing	Ford	266	24
14	28	27	Paul Menard	Richard Childress Racing	Chevrolet	266	23
15	1	18	Kyle Busch	Joe Gibbs Racing	Toyota	266	32
16	9	3	Austin Dillon	Richard Childress Racing	Chevrolet	266	21
17	20	88	Dale Earnhardt Jr.	Hendrick Motorsports	Chevrolet	266	20
18	22	10	Danica Patrick	Stewart–Haas Racing	Ford	265	19
19	17	41	Kurt Busch	Stewart–Haas Racing	Ford	265	21
20	27	34	Landon Cassill	Front Row Motorsports	Ford	265	17
21	25	5	Kasey Kahne	Hendrick Motorsports	Chevrolet	264	16
22	26	6	Trevor Bayne	Roush Fenway Racing	Ford	264	15
23	16	31	Ryan Newman	Richard Childress Racing	Chevrolet	264	14
24	21	43	Aric Almirola	Richard Petty Motorsports	Ford	264	13
25	15	17	Ricky Stenhouse Jr.	Roush Fenway Racing	Ford	263	12
26	29	47	A. J. Allmendinger	JTG Daugherty Racing	Chevrolet	263	11
27	18	37	Chris Buescher	JTG Daugherty Racing	Chevrolet	263	10
28	23	13	Ty Dillon (R)	Germain Racing	Chevrolet	262	9
29	31	38	David Ragan	Front Row Motorsports	Ford	262	8
30	30	95	Michael McDowell	Leavine Family Racing	Chevrolet	262	7
31	32	32	Matt DiBenedetto	Go Fas Racing	Ford	261	6
32	34	15	Reed Sorenson	Premium Motorsports	Chevrolet	259	5
33	24	77	Erik Jones (R)	Furniture Row Racing	Toyota	259	4
34	37	33	Jeffrey Earnhardt	Circle Sport – The Motorsports Group	Chevrolet	258	3
35	35	72	Cole Whitt	TriStar Motorsports	Chevrolet	257	2
36	33	23	Corey LaJoie (R)	BK Racing	Toyota	256	1
37	40	83	Brett Moffitt (i)	BK Racing	Toyota	255	0
38	36	55	Gray Gaulding (R)	Premium Motorsports	Toyota	254	1
39	38	66	Timmy Hill (i)	MBM Motorsports	Chevrolet	254	0
40	39	51	Ray Black Jr. (i)	Rick Ware Racing	Chevrolet	251	0
Official race results

=== Race statistics ===
- Lead changes: 7 among different drivers
- Cautions/Laps: 4 for 21
- Red flags: 0
- Time of race: 2 hours, 45 minutes and 16 seconds
- Average speed: 145.401 miles per hour (234.000 km/h)

== Media ==
=== Television ===
NBC Sports covered the race on the television side. Rick Allen, Jeff Burton, and Steve Letarte called the race in the booth. Dave Burns, Parker Kligerman, Marty Snider, and Kelli Stavast reported from pit lane during the race.

NBCSN
Booth announcers	Pit reporters
Lap-by-lap: Rick Allen; Color-commentator: Jeff Burton; Color-commentator: Steve Letarte	Dave Burns; Parker Kligerman; Marty Snider; Kelli Stavast

=== Radio ===
The Motor Racing Network had the radio call for the race, which was simulcast on Sirius XM NASCAR Radio.

MRN
Booth announcers	Turn announcers	Pit reporters
Lead announcer: Jeff Striegle; Announcer: Dave Moody; Announcer: Rusty Wallace	Turns 1 & 2: Mike Bagley; Turns 3 & 4: Kyle Rickey	Alex Hayden; Pete Pistone; Steve Post; Kim Coon

== Standings after the race ==
Drivers' Championship standings

	Pos	Driver	Points
	1	Martin Truex Jr.	2,102
	2	Kyle Larson	2,075 (–27)
3	3	Kevin Harvick	2,067 (–35)
	4	Brad Keselowski	2,061 (–41)
2	5	Kyle Busch	2,061 (–41)
4	6	Chase Elliott	2,059 (–43)
	7	Denny Hamlin	2,058 (–44)
3	8	Jimmie Johnson	2,046 (–56)
6	9	Matt Kenseth	2,039 (–63)
1	10	Ryan Blaney	2,034 (–68)
5	11	Jamie McMurray	2,031 (–71)
2	12	Austin Dillon	2,026 (–76)
1	13	Kurt Busch	2,026 (–76)
6	14	Ricky Stenhouse Jr.	2,022 (–80)
2	15	Kasey Kahne	2,021 (–81)
5	16	Ryan Newman	2,019 (–83)
Official driver's standings

Manufacturers' Championship standings

Pos	Manufacturer	Points
1	Chevrolet	953
2	Toyota	946 (–7)
3	Ford	943 (–10)
Official manufacturers' standings

- Note: Only the first 16 positions are included for the driver standings.

Previous race: 2017 Federated Auto Parts 400	Monster Energy NASCAR Cup Series; 2017 season	Next race: 2017 ISM Connect 300
