= 2015 NASCAR Sprint Cup Series =

American motorsport season

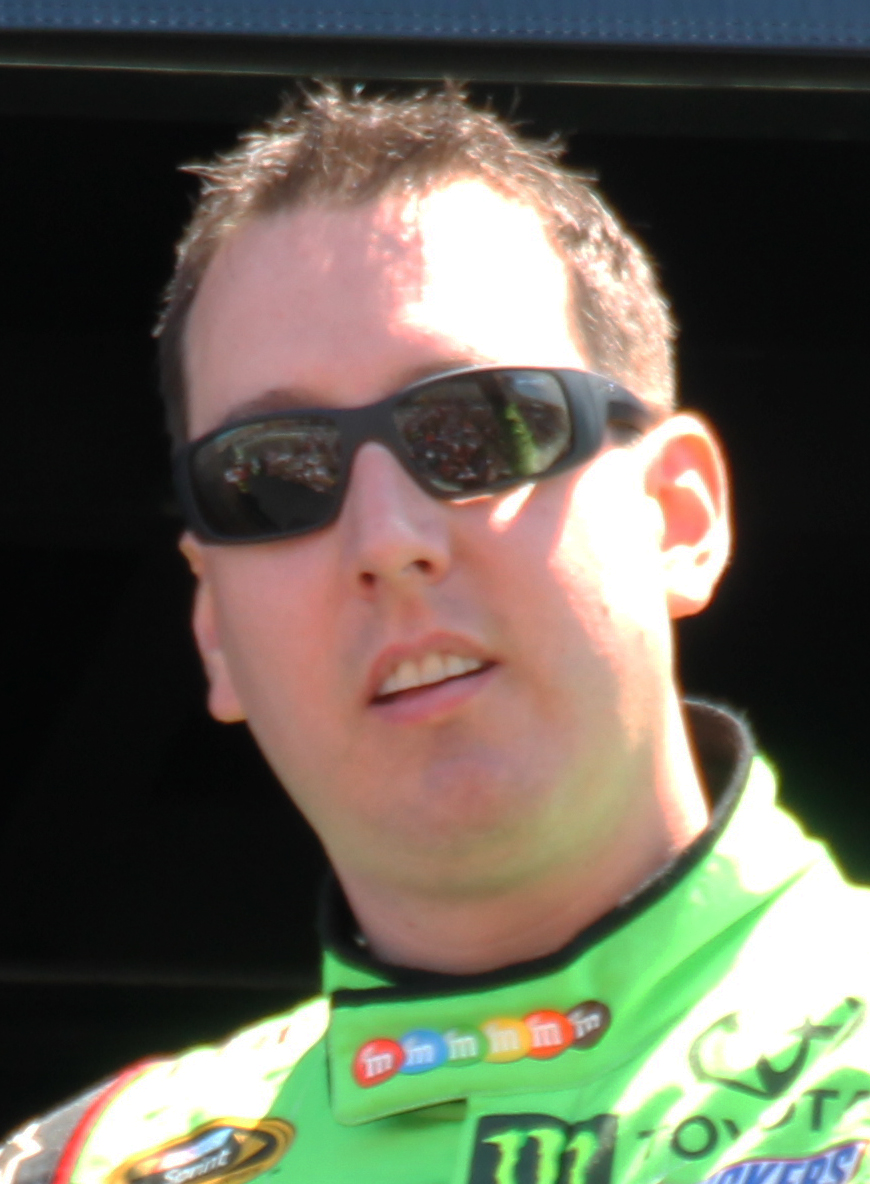
Kyle Busch, the 2015 Sprint Cup Series champion

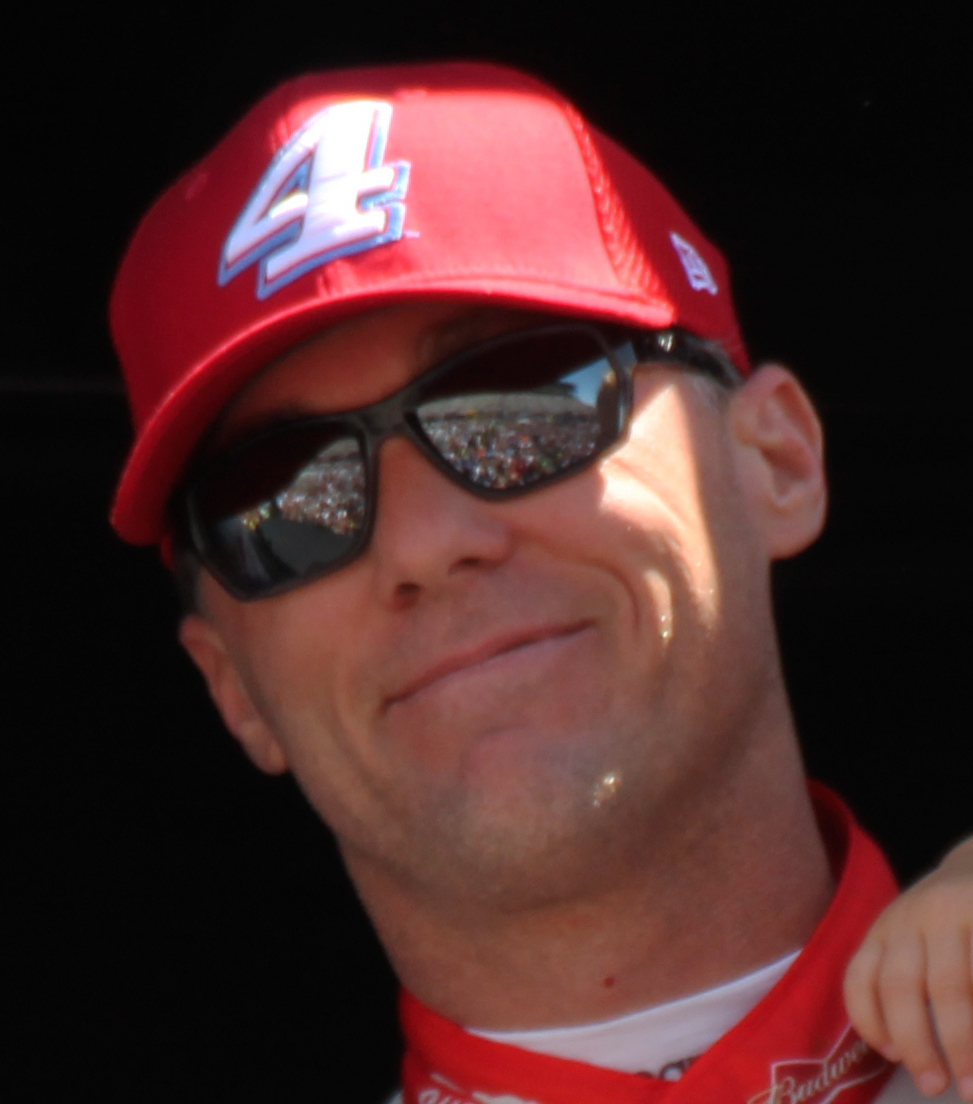
Kevin Harvick, the 2015 Sprint Cup Series runner-up

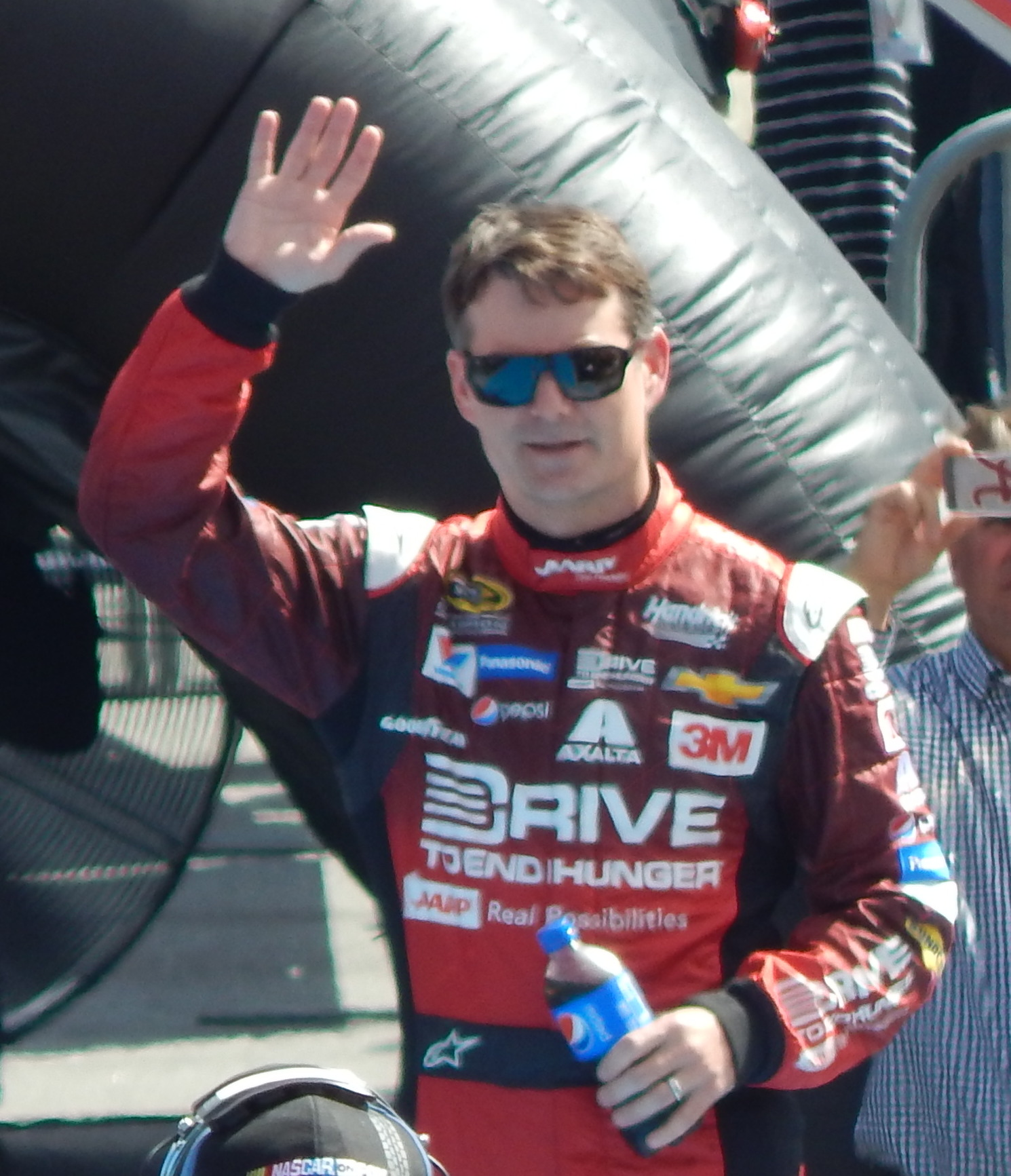
Jeff Gordon, who retired from full-time racing after the season, finished 5 points behind Kyle Busch in third place

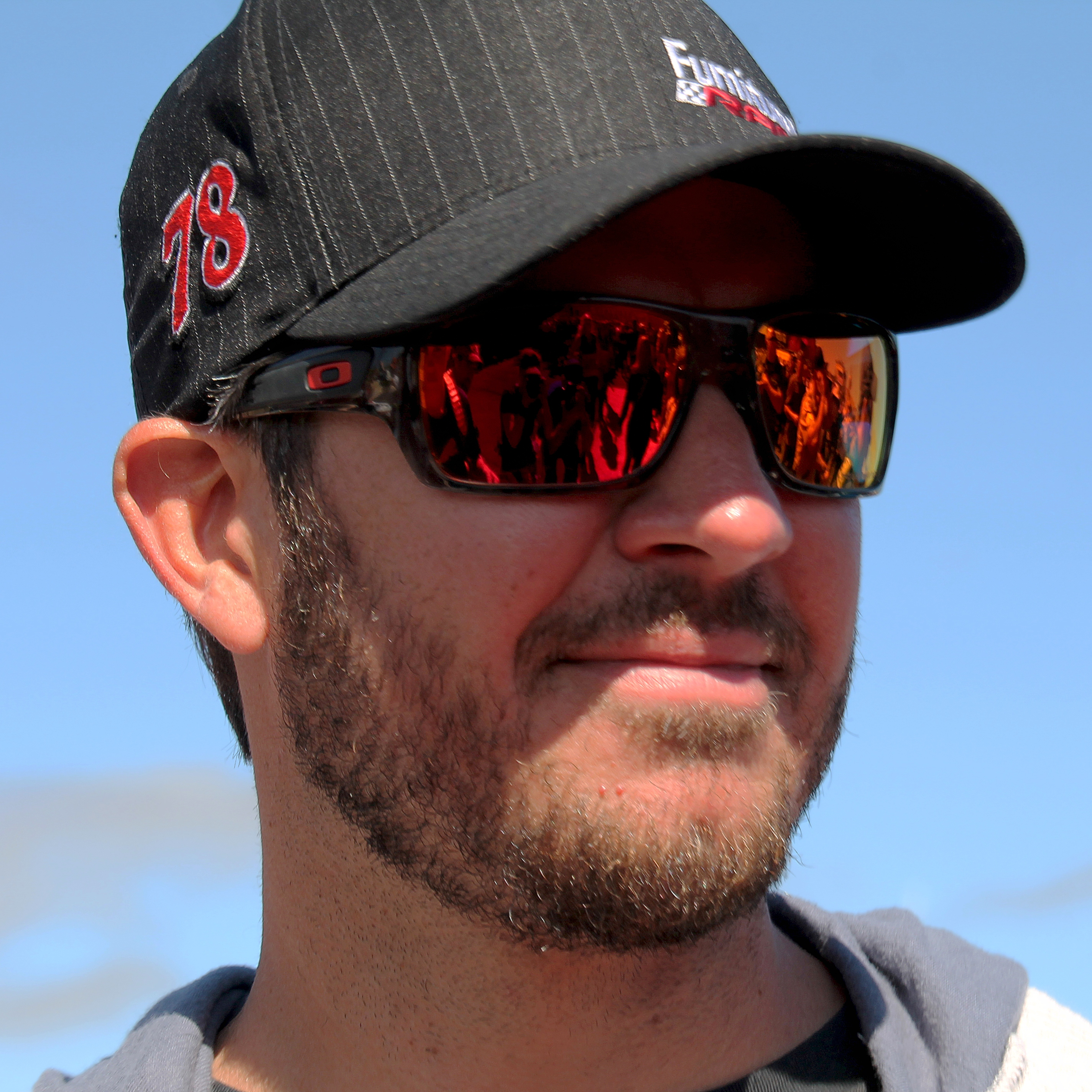
Martin Truex Jr., finished 11 points behind Kyle Busch in fourth place

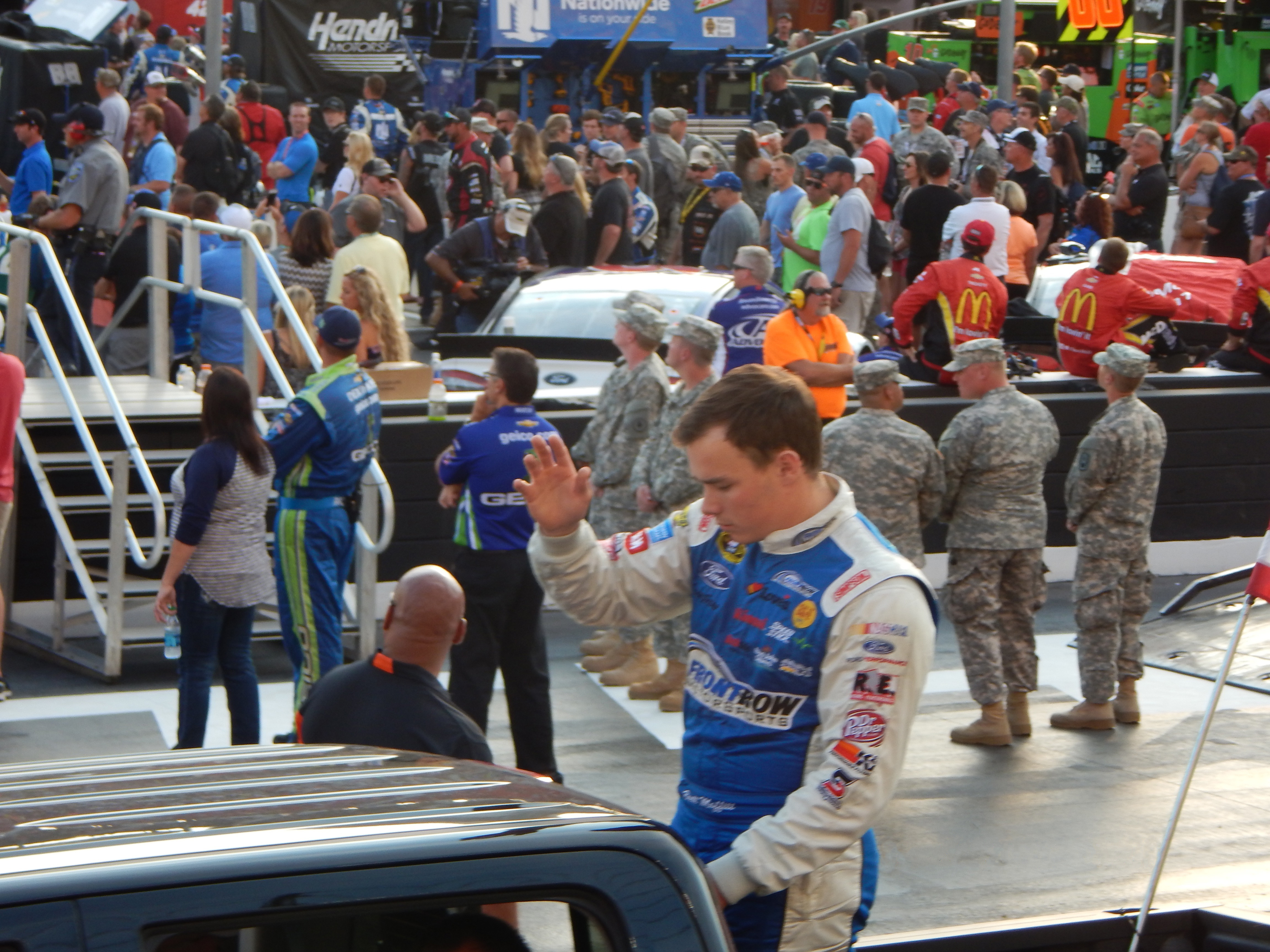
Brett Moffitt, rookie of the year.

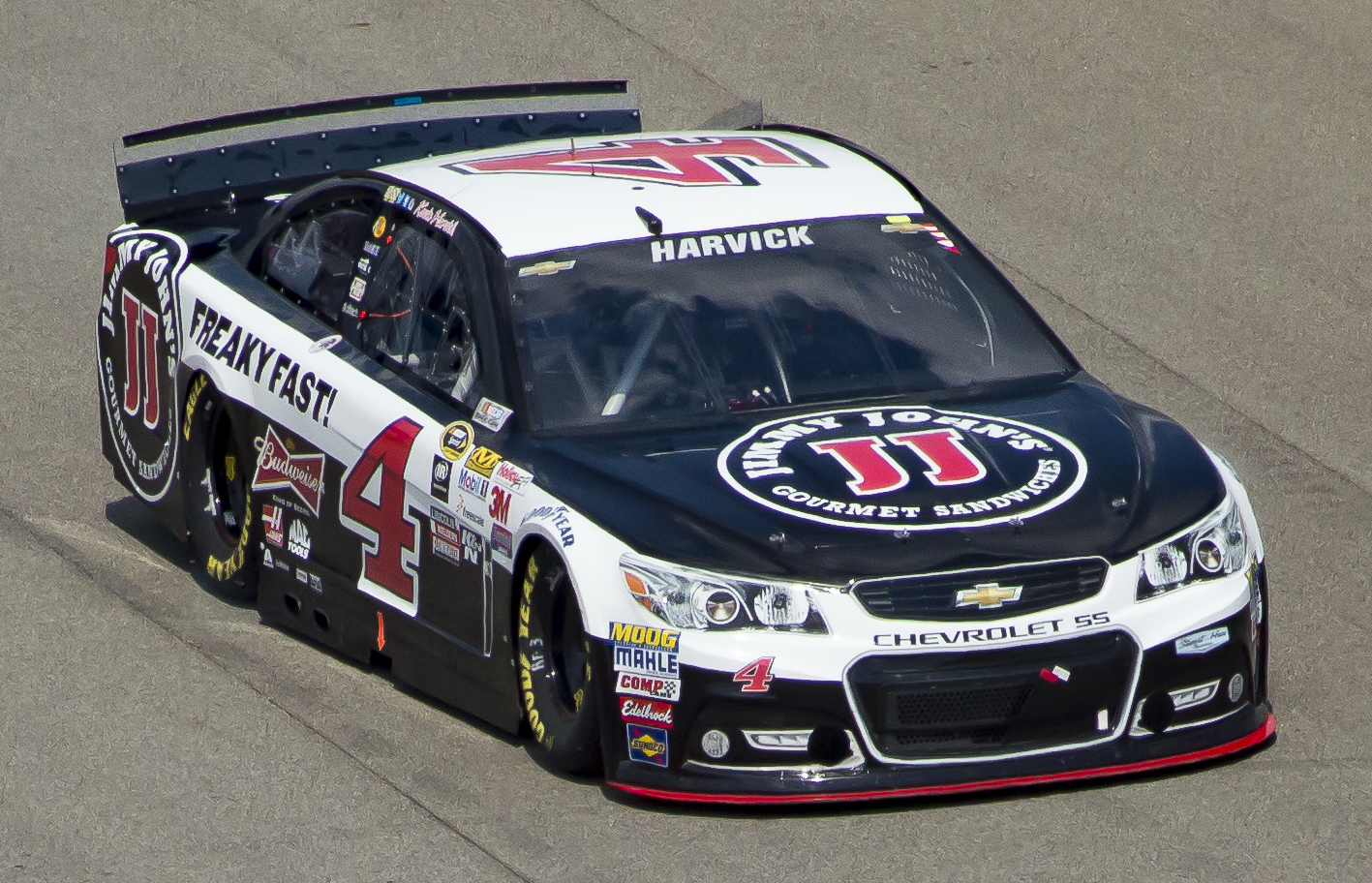
Chevrolet won the Manufacturer's championship with 15 wins & 1584 points, their 13th championship in a row. They wouldn't win again until 2021.

The 2015 NASCAR Sprint Cup Series was the 67th season of professional stock car racing in the United States and the 44th modern-era Cup season. The season began at Daytona International Speedway with the Sprint Unlimited exhibition race, the Budweiser Duels, and the Daytona 500. The season ended with the Ford EcoBoost 400 at Homestead-Miami Speedway. Kyle Busch won the championship, despite missing the first third of the season due to severe leg injuries suffered in an Xfinity Series race at Daytona. Busch also became the first Toyota driver to win a Cup championship. Brett Moffitt was named Rookie of the Year despite not running a full season.

The season also marked the first season of a new television contract. During the season, races were televised in the United States on Fox, Fox Sports 1, NBC, and NBCSN. ESPN and Turner Sports, who televised races from 2007 to 2014, did not seek to renew their contracts with NASCAR following the completion of the 2014 season; this marked the end of a 31-year relationship between NASCAR and Turner's primary stations, TBS and TNT. In addition, it was the first season on the newly rebranded Fox Sports Racing in Canada and the Caribbean.

On January 22, 2015, four-time champion Jeff Gordon announced that 2015 would be his final season as a full-time driver, but he did not rule out complete retirement. Chase Elliott replaced him in the No. 24 car for Hendrick Motorsports in 2016.

== Teams and drivers ==
=== Complete schedule ===
There were 43 full-time teams in 2015.

Manufacturer	Team	No.	Race driver	Crew chief
Chevrolet	Chip Ganassi Racing	1	Jamie McMurray	Matt McCall
Chevrolet	Chip Ganassi Racing	42	Kyle Larson 35	Chris Heroy
Chevrolet	Chip Ganassi Racing	42	Regan Smith 1	Chris Heroy
Chevrolet	Furniture Row Racing	78	Martin Truex Jr.	Cole Pearn
Chevrolet	Germain Racing	13	Casey Mears	Bootie Barker
Chevrolet	Hendrick Motorsports	5	Kasey Kahne	Keith Rodden
Chevrolet	Hendrick Motorsports	24	Jeff Gordon	Alan Gustafson
Chevrolet	Hendrick Motorsports	48	Jimmie Johnson	Chad Knaus
Chevrolet	Hendrick Motorsports	88	Dale Earnhardt Jr.	Greg Ives
Chevrolet	HScott Motorsports	46	Michael Annett	Jay Guy
Chevrolet	HScott Motorsports	51	Justin Allgaier	Steve Addington
Chevrolet	JTG Daugherty Racing	47	A. J. Allmendinger	Brian Burns
Chevrolet	Richard Childress Racing	3	Austin Dillon	Gil Martin 15; Slugger Labbe 21
Chevrolet	Richard Childress Racing	27	Paul Menard	Justin Alexander
Chevrolet	Richard Childress Racing	31	Ryan Newman	Luke Lambert 30; Todd Parrott 6
Chevrolet	Richard Childress Racing	33	Ty Dillon 5	Todd Parrott 9 Mike Chance 1 Slugger Labbe 6 Pat Tryson 6 Gil Martin 1 Paul Clapprood 13
Chevrolet	Richard Childress Racing	33	Brian Scott 10	Todd Parrott 9 Mike Chance 1 Slugger Labbe 6 Pat Tryson 6 Gil Martin 1 Paul Clapprood 13
Chevrolet	Hillman-Circle Sport LLC	33	Michael Annett 1 (Note: Annett & sponsor Pilot Flying J moved to the No. 33 at Atlanta after the No. 46 failed to qualify.)	Todd Parrott 9 Mike Chance 1 Slugger Labbe 6 Pat Tryson 6 Gil Martin 1 Paul Clapprood 13
Chevrolet	Hillman-Circle Sport LLC	33	Alex Kennedy (R) 13	Todd Parrott 9 Mike Chance 1 Slugger Labbe 6 Pat Tryson 6 Gil Martin 1 Paul Clapprood 13
Chevrolet	Hillman-Circle Sport LLC	33	Derek White 1	Todd Parrott 9 Mike Chance 1 Slugger Labbe 6 Pat Tryson 6 Gil Martin 1 Paul Clapprood 13
Chevrolet	Hillman-Circle Sport LLC	33	Travis Kvapil 2	Todd Parrott 9 Mike Chance 1 Slugger Labbe 6 Pat Tryson 6 Gil Martin 1 Paul Clapprood 13
Chevrolet	Hillman-Circle Sport LLC	33	Mike Bliss 2	Todd Parrott 9 Mike Chance 1 Slugger Labbe 6 Pat Tryson 6 Gil Martin 1 Paul Clapprood 13
Chevrolet	Hillman-Circle Sport LLC	33	B. J. McLeod 1	Todd Parrott 9 Mike Chance 1 Slugger Labbe 6 Pat Tryson 6 Gil Martin 1 Paul Clapprood 13
Chevrolet	Hillman-Circle Sport LLC	33	Ryan Ellis 1	Todd Parrott 9 Mike Chance 1 Slugger Labbe 6 Pat Tryson 6 Gil Martin 1 Paul Clapprood 13
Chevrolet	Hillman-Circle Sport LLC	40	Landon Cassill	Mark Hillman
Chevrolet	Stewart–Haas Racing	4	Kevin Harvick	Rodney Childers
Chevrolet	Stewart–Haas Racing	10	Danica Patrick	Daniel Knost
Chevrolet	Stewart–Haas Racing	14	Tony Stewart	Chad Johnston
Chevrolet	Stewart–Haas Racing	41	Regan Smith 3	Tony Gibson
Chevrolet	Stewart–Haas Racing	41	Kurt Busch 33	Tony Gibson
Chevrolet	Tommy Baldwin Racing	7	Alex Bowman	Kevin Manion 10; Tommy Baldwin Jr. 26
Ford	Front Row Motorsports	34	David Ragan 1	Derrick Finley
Ford	Front Row Motorsports	34	Joe Nemechek 1	Derrick Finley
Ford	Front Row Motorsports	34	Brett Moffitt (R) 25	Derrick Finley
Ford	Front Row Motorsports	34	Chris Buescher 6	Derrick Finley
Ford	Front Row Motorsports	34	Reed Sorenson 1	Derrick Finley
Ford	Front Row Motorsports	34	Justin Marks 1	Derrick Finley
Ford	Front Row Motorsports	34	Josh Wise 1	Derrick Finley
Ford	Front Row Motorsports	35	Cole Whitt	Randy Cox
Ford	Front Row Motorsports	38	David Gilliland	Donnie Wingo
Ford	Go FAS Racing	32	Bobby Labonte 4 (Note: Past Champions' provisional was used by Bobby Labonte at the Daytona 500)	Clinton Cram
Ford	Go FAS Racing	32	Mike Bliss 10	Clinton Cram
Ford	Go FAS Racing	32	Joey Gase 4	Clinton Cram
Ford	Go FAS Racing	32	Travis Kvapil 2	Clinton Cram
Ford	Go FAS Racing	32	Boris Said 2	Clinton Cram
Ford	Go FAS Racing	32	Will Kimmel 2	Clinton Cram
Ford	Go FAS Racing	32	Eddie MacDonald 1	Clinton Cram
Ford	Go FAS Racing	32	Josh Wise 8	Clinton Cram
Ford	Go FAS Racing	32	Jeffrey Earnhardt 2	Clinton Cram
Ford	Go FAS Racing	32	Kyle Fowler 1	Clinton Cram
Ford	Richard Petty Motorsports	9	Sam Hornish Jr.	Drew Blickensderfer 10; Kevin Manion 26
Ford	Richard Petty Motorsports	43	Aric Almirola	Trent Owens
Ford	Roush Fenway Racing	6	Trevor Bayne	Bob Osborne
Ford	Roush Fenway Racing	16	Greg Biffle	Matt Puccia
Ford	Roush Fenway Racing	17	Ricky Stenhouse Jr.	Nick Sandler
Ford	Team Penske	2	Brad Keselowski	Paul Wolfe
Ford	Team Penske	22	Joey Logano	Todd Gordon
Toyota	BK Racing	23	J. J. Yeley 24	Joe Williams 35; Patrick Donahue1
Toyota	BK Racing	23	Jeb Burton 12 (R)	Joe Williams 35; Patrick Donahue1
Toyota	BK Racing	26	Jeb Burton 24 (R)	Patrick Donahue 35; Joe Williams 1
Toyota	BK Racing	26	J. J. Yeley 11	Patrick Donahue 35; Joe Williams 1
Toyota	BK Racing	26	Josh Wise 1	Patrick Donahue 35; Joe Williams 1
Toyota	BK Racing	83	Johnny Sauter 1	Doug Richert 28; Gene Nead 8
Toyota	BK Racing	83	Matt DiBenedetto (R) 35	Doug Richert 28; Gene Nead 8
Toyota	Joe Gibbs Racing	11	Denny Hamlin	Dave Rogers
Toyota	Joe Gibbs Racing	18	Matt Crafton 1	Adam Stevens
Toyota	Joe Gibbs Racing	18	David Ragan 9	Adam Stevens
Toyota	Joe Gibbs Racing	18	Erik Jones 1	Adam Stevens
Toyota	Joe Gibbs Racing	18	Kyle Busch 25	Adam Stevens
Toyota	Joe Gibbs Racing	19	Carl Edwards	Darian Grubb
Toyota	Joe Gibbs Racing	20	Matt Kenseth 34	Jason Ratcliff
Toyota	Joe Gibbs Racing	20	Erik Jones 2	Jason Ratcliff
Toyota	Michael Waltrip Racing	15	Clint Bowyer	Brian Pattie 16; Billy Scott 18; Dax Gerringer 2
Toyota	Michael Waltrip Racing	55	Michael Waltrip 2	Billy Scott 15; Brian Pattie 20; Dax Gerringer 1
Toyota	Michael Waltrip Racing	55	Brett Moffitt (R) 6	Billy Scott 15; Brian Pattie 20; Dax Gerringer 1
Toyota	Michael Waltrip Racing	55	Brian Vickers 2	Billy Scott 15; Brian Pattie 20; Dax Gerringer 1
Toyota	Michael Waltrip Racing	55	David Ragan 26	Billy Scott 15; Brian Pattie 20; Dax Gerringer 1
Chevrolet 7 Ford 28 Toyota 1	Phil Parsons Racing 11; Premium Motorsports 24; Michael Waltrip Racing 1	98	Josh Wise 18	Gene Nead 20; Jay Robinson 1 Scott Eggleston 4 Zach McGowan10; Bobby Kennedy 1
Chevrolet 7 Ford 28 Toyota 1	Phil Parsons Racing 11; Premium Motorsports 24; Michael Waltrip Racing 1	98	Timmy Hill 6	Gene Nead 20; Jay Robinson 1 Scott Eggleston 4 Zach McGowan10; Bobby Kennedy 1
Chevrolet 7 Ford 28 Toyota 1	Phil Parsons Racing 11; Premium Motorsports 24; Michael Waltrip Racing 1	98	Reed Sorenson 5	Gene Nead 20; Jay Robinson 1 Scott Eggleston 4 Zach McGowan10; Bobby Kennedy 1
Chevrolet 7 Ford 28 Toyota 1	Phil Parsons Racing 11; Premium Motorsports 24; Michael Waltrip Racing 1	98	T. J. Bell 1	Gene Nead 20; Jay Robinson 1 Scott Eggleston 4 Zach McGowan10; Bobby Kennedy 1
Chevrolet 7 Ford 28 Toyota 1	Phil Parsons Racing 11; Premium Motorsports 24; Michael Waltrip Racing 1	98	Ryan Preece 5	Gene Nead 20; Jay Robinson 1 Scott Eggleston 4 Zach McGowan10; Bobby Kennedy 1
Chevrolet 7 Ford 28 Toyota 1	Phil Parsons Racing 11; Premium Motorsports 24; Michael Waltrip Racing 1	98	Michael Waltrip 1	Gene Nead 20; Jay Robinson 1 Scott Eggleston 4 Zach McGowan10; Bobby Kennedy 1
Chevrolet 30 Ford 4 Toyota 2	Premium Motorsports	62	Brian Scott 1 (Note: Scott's Daytona car prepared by Richard Childress Racing.)	Slugger Labbe 1 Zach McGowan 7 Scott Eggleston 14; Wayne Carroll 14
Chevrolet 30 Ford 4 Toyota 2	Premium Motorsports	62	Brendan Gaughan 16	Slugger Labbe 1 Zach McGowan 7 Scott Eggleston 14; Wayne Carroll 14
Chevrolet 30 Ford 4 Toyota 2	Premium Motorsports	62	Reed Sorenson 8	Slugger Labbe 1 Zach McGowan 7 Scott Eggleston 14; Wayne Carroll 14
Chevrolet 30 Ford 4 Toyota 2	Premium Motorsports	62	Timmy Hill 10	Slugger Labbe 1 Zach McGowan 7 Scott Eggleston 14; Wayne Carroll 14
Chevrolet 30 Ford 4 Toyota 2	Premium Motorsports	62	T. J. Bell 1	Slugger Labbe 1 Zach McGowan 7 Scott Eggleston 14; Wayne Carroll 14

=== Limited schedule ===
Manufacturer	Team	No.	Race driver	Crew chief	Round(s)
Chevrolet	Hendrick Motorsports	25	Chase Elliott	Kenny Francis	5
Chevrolet	Hillman-Circle Sport LLC	39	Travis Kvapil	Mike Chance	2
Chevrolet	Team XTREME Racing	44	Reed Sorenson	Peter Sospenzo	1
Chevrolet	Team XTREME Racing	44	Travis Kvapil	Peter Sospenzo	3
Chevrolet	The Motorsports Group	30	Ron Hornaday Jr.	Pat Tryson 2 Dave Fuge 11	4
Chevrolet	The Motorsports Group	30	Jeff Green	Pat Tryson 2 Dave Fuge 11	3
Chevrolet	The Motorsports Group	30	Travis Kvapil	Pat Tryson 2 Dave Fuge 11	5
Chevrolet	The Motorsports Group	30	Josh Wise	Pat Tryson 2 Dave Fuge 11	1
Ford	Leavine Family Racing	95	Michael McDowell	Wally Rogers 14; Kevin Walter 6	20
Ford	Wood Brothers Racing	21	Ryan Blaney	Jeremy Bullins	19
Toyota
Toyota	RAB Racing	29	Justin Marks	Matthew Lucas	1
Toyota	RAB Racing	29	Reed Sorenson	Matthew Lucas	3
Toyota	Premium Motorsports	66	Mike Wallace	Scott Eggleston	1
Chevrolet	Premium Motorsports	66	Mike Wallace	Scott Eggleston	2
Chevrolet	Premium Motorsports	66	Tanner Berryhill	Scott Eggleston	1

=== Changes ===
==== Teams ====
- Joe Gibbs Racing expanded to a four-car team with the addition of Carl Edwards in the No. 19, previously with Roush Fenway Racing in the No. 99 in 2014.
- HScott Motorsports expanded to a two-car team with the addition of Michael Annett in the No. 46, previously with Tommy Baldwin Racing in the No. 7 in 2014.
- Front Row Motorsports expanded to a three-car full-time team with the addition of Cole Whitt in the No. 35, previously with BK Racing in the No. 26 in 2014.
- Longtime NASCAR team owner and former Identity Ventures Racing partner Jay Robinson started Premium Motorsports. The team fielded the No. 62 Chevrolet for Brendan Gaughan while points and cars for the No. 62 came from the closed No. 36 team of Tommy Baldwin Racing after 2014. Gaughan left the team after Daytona in July with the season being finished with various drivers and various manufacturers. The team also fielded the No. 66 Toyota for Mike Wallace with owner points and cars for the No. 66 coming from the closed No. 66 Identity Ventures Racing team after 2014. However, Robinson shut the No. 66 team down due to lack of sponsorship and qualifying performance after 4 races, with Tanner Berryhill in a Chevrolet for the 4th race.
- After Talladega in May, Phil Parsons sold Phil Parsons Racing to Premium Motorsports due to sponsorship issues. Josh Wise left the team after Kentucky in July, with the season being finished with various drivers and various manufacturers.
- The Motorsports Group, a long-time Xfinity Series team, announces they would field a full-time Cup team, the No. 30 Chevrolet with Ron Hornaday Jr. as the primary driver. However, the team only ran part-time with Hornaday only attempting 4 races. 3 other drivers also attempted races in 2015.

==== Drivers ====
- Sam Hornish Jr. replaced Marcos Ambrose in the No. 9 car, when he left Richard Petty Motorsports to return to racing in V8 Supercars in Australia, a series in which he won in 2003 and 2004.
- Trevor Bayne began racing full-time in the No. 6 Roush Fenway Racing car as the team discontinued the No. 99 formerly driven by Carl Edwards. Although 2015 is the first season that Bayne declared his eligibility for the Sprint Cup series, NASCAR ruled that he is ineligible to run for Rookie of the Year consideration due to "too many accumulated starts". Bayne ran part-time for Wood Brothers Racing in the No. 21 from 2011 to 2014.
- Alex Bowman replaced Michael Annett in the Tommy Baldwin Racing No. 7. He drove the No. 23 for BK Racing in 2014.
- Matt DiBenedetto moved up to the NASCAR Sprint Cup Series in the No. 83 for BK Racing after running for The Motorsports Group in the NASCAR Nationwide Series in 2014. However Johnny Sauter ran the Daytona 500.
- J. J. Yeley replaced Alex Bowman in the BK Racing No. 23 after running part-time for various teams in 2014. After Bristol in August, BK Racing would swap drivers and Jeb Burton would switch to the No. 23 while Yeley moved to the No. 26
- Jeb Burton would run full-time in the No. 26 car for BK Racing after running in the Truck Series in 2014, replacing Cole Whitt. After Bristol in August, BK Racing would swap drivers and J. J. Yeley would switch to the No. 26 while Burton moved to the No. 23
- Bobby Labonte replaced his older brother Terry Labonte for Go FAS Racing's No. 32 in the four restrictor plate races.
- Ryan Blaney ran part-time for Wood Brothers Racing in the No. 21, replacing Trevor Bayne.
- Chase Elliott ran a limited 5 race schedule for Hendrick Motorsports, piloting the No. 25 NAPA Auto Parts sponsored Chevrolet.
- Kyle Busch, driver of the No. 18 for Joe Gibbs Racing, suffered a broken leg during the Xfinity Series race held the day before the Daytona 500 and missed the first 11 races of the season. Matt Crafton was named his replacement for the 500, and David Ragan was tapped to serve as the team's interim driver from Atlanta until Talladega. Erik Jones was his replacement in the No. 18 at Kansas.
- Brian Vickers missed the first two races of the season due to health issues. Michael Waltrip drove the car in the Daytona 500 and Brett Moffitt did in Atlanta. Vickers' return to NASCAR didn't last very long and he was sidelined again after competing in two races. He would be out the rest of the season. Moffitt took over the No. 55 and declared his candidacy for Rookie of the Year. Waltrip again drove the No. 55 at Talladega and David Ragan filled in for the rest of the season starting at Kansas, after he was no longer needed in the No. 18 with Kyle Busch returning from injury.
- After David Ragan was loaned to Joe Gibbs Racing and later Michael Waltrip Racing, Front Row Motorsports' No. 34 car was filled by Joe Nemechek, Brett Moffitt, Chris Buescher, and Reed Sorenson. Moffitt was named the team's primary driver starting at Charlotte, with Justin Marks driving the car at Sonoma and Chris Buescher driving it at Watkins Glen.
- Kurt Busch, driver of the No. 41 for Stewart–Haas Racing, was suspended indefinitely by NASCAR for his role in a domestic incident involving his former girlfriend. Regan Smith replaced him for the Daytona 500 and the races held in Atlanta and Las Vegas. Busch was reinstated and returned to the car in the Phoenix race.
- Kyle Larson missed the March Martinsville race after fainting in an autograph session the day before the race, requiring a stay in the hospital that night. Regan Smith replaced him in the No. 42.
- Matt Kenseth was suspended after he intentionally wrecked Joey Logano in the Chase race at Martinsville. Erik Jones ran in the No. 20 at Texas and Phoenix. Kenseth would return to the No. 20 at Homestead.

==== Crew chiefs ====
- Adam Stevens took over crew chief duties on the No. 18 Joe Gibbs Racing Toyota with Kyle Busch, replacing Dave Rogers. Stevens was the crew chief for the Joe Gibbs Racing No. 54 NASCAR Nationwide Series car in 2014.
- Darian Grubb took over crew chief duties on the new No. 19 Joe Gibbs Racing Toyota with Carl Edwards. Grubb was the crew chief for Denny Hamlin in 2014.
- Dave Rogers took over crew chief duties on the No. 11 Joe Gibbs Racing Toyota with Denny Hamlin, replacing Darian Grubb. Rogers was the crew chief for Kyle Busch in 2014.
- Greg Ives took over crew chief duties on the No. 88 Hendrick Motorsports Chevrolet with Dale Earnhardt Jr., replacing Steve Letarte, who retired. Ives was the crew chief for the JR Motorsports No. 9 NASCAR Nationwide Series Champion Chase Elliott in 2014.
- Keith Rodden took over crew chief duties on the No. 5 Hendrick Motorsports Chevrolet with Kasey Kahne, replacing Kenny Francis. Rodden was the crew chief for Jamie McMurray in 2014.
- Matt McCall took over crew chief duties on the No. 1 Chip Ganassi Racing Chevrolet with Jamie McMurray, replacing Keith Rodden. McCall was the team engineer on the No. 31, driven by Ryan Newman in 2014.
- Cole Pearn took over crew chief duties on the No. 78 Furniture Row Racing Chevrolet with Martin Truex Jr., replacing Todd Berrier. Pearn was the team's lead race engineer in 2014.
- Nick Sandler took over crew chief duties on the No. 17 Roush Fenway Racing Ford with Ricky Stenhouse Jr., replacing Mike Kelley. Sandler was the No. 99 team head engineer in 2014.
- Bob Osborne took over crew chief duties on the No. 6 Roush Fenway Racing Ford with Trevor Bayne, replacing Jimmy Fennig in the No. 99.
- Jay Guy was the crew chief of the new No. 46 HScott Motorsports Chevrolet with Michael Annett. Guy was the crew chief on the Front Row Motorsports No. 34 and No. 38 in 2014.
- Randy Cox was the crew chief of the new No. 35 Front Row Motorsports Ford with Cole Whitt. Cox was the crew chief for Whitt on the BK Racing No. 26 in 2014.
- Donnie Wingo took over the crew chief of the No. 38 Front Row Motorsports Ford with David Gilliland, replacing Jay Guy. Wingo was the crew chief for Trevor Bayne in the part-time Wood Brothers Racing No. 21 in 2014.
- BK Racing Director of Research and Development, Doug Richert, was temporarily the crew chief of the No. 83 BK Racing Toyota with Matt DiBenedetto, replacing Joe Williams. Gene Nead would later take over after leaving Premium Motorsports/Phil Parsons Racing midway through the 2015 season.
- Joe Williams took over the crew chief of the No. 23 BK Racing Toyota with J. J. Yeley (later Jeb Burton), replacing Dave Winston. Williams was the No. 83 crew chief in 2014.
- Patrick Donahue took over the crew chief of the No. 26 BK Racing Toyota with Jeb Burton (later J. J. Yeley), replacing Randy Cox.
- The No. 33 Circle Sport Chevrolet had various crew chiefs throughout 2015.
- The No. 62 and 98 Premium Motorsports cars had various crew chiefs throughout 2015.
- Jeremy Bullins took over the crew chief of the No. 21 Wood Brothers Racing Ford with Ryan Blaney, replacing Donnie Wingo. Bullins was the crew chief of the Team Penske No. 22 NASCAR Nationwide Series car in 2014.
- Kenny Francis was the crew chief of part-time Hendrick Motorsports Chevrolet with Chase Elliott. Francis was Kasey Kahne's crew chief in 2014.
- Kevin Manion took over crew chief duties on the No. 9 Richard Petty Motorsports Ford with Sam Hornish Jr. after Talladega in May, replacing Drew Blickensderfer. Manion was the crew chief on the No. 7 up until that point in the season.
- Tommy Baldwin Jr. took over crew chief duties on the No. 7 Tommy Baldwin Racing Chevrolet with Alex Bowman after Talladagea in May, replacing Kevin Manion after he left to take over the No. 9.
- After Pocono in June, Michael Waltrip Racing swapped its two crew chiefs, with Billy Scott moving from the No. 55 to the No. 15 and Brian Pattie moving from the No. 15 to the No. 55
- Slugger Labbe took over crew chief duties on the No. 3 Richard Childress Racing Chevrolet with Austin Dillon after Michigan in June, replacing Gil Martin.
- Kevin Walter took over crew chief duties of the part-time No. 95 Leavine Family Racing Ford with Michael McDowell after Darlington in September, replacing Wally Rogers.

== Rule changes ==
=== Pre-season ===
Sources:

- Private testing is banned starting at the conclusion of the 2014 season. Testing will only be permitted during NASCAR and Goodyear sanctioned tests. Further, there was not a pre-season test at Daytona in 2015. A violation of this rule will be a P6 penalty.
- Only drivers licensed and approved for Sprint Cup competition will be permitted to participate in tire testing.
- At road courses, it is now permissible to run qualifying and race sessions under wet-weather conditions. Goodyear will supply wet-weather tires for use in Sprint Cup competition and teams will be required to bring cars with windshield wipers, defoggers, and wet-weather racing capabilities.
- Tapered spacers will be installed in the engines to reduce horsepower from 850 to 725.
- Flat valve lifters will be replaced with roller valve lifters.
- Lower differential gear ratios (higher gears) will also be mandated targeting a reduction from a 9,500 rpm max to a 9,000 rpm max.
- Rear spoiler height will be reduced from 8 inches to 6 inches.
- Teams will have the option of installing a driver adjustable track bar.
- The radiator pan will be decreased from 43 inches to 38 inches.
- The minimum weight of the car has been reduced by 50 lb to 3,250 lb.
- NASCAR has approved a new brake caliper system for 2015 and issued a new parts approval process.
- Teams are not allowed to alter the side skirts of their cars during the race. At tracks where aerodynamics were important in 2014, many teams would pull the side bodywork of the car during early pit stops. The practice, officially known as vertical rocker panel extensions, was used to limit airflow underneath the vehicle.
- An automated electronic pit road officiating system will be implemented after extensive testing during the 2014 Chase, eliminating the need for human officials to stand in the pit lane.
- If a vehicle has to pit outside its assigned pit box and the crew starts removing tire(s), the team can reinstall the tire(s) before moving the car back into its assigned pit stall to avoid penalties.
- Additional crew member(s) assisting from an adjacent pit box may be counted towards the limit of seven over the wall.
- Crew member interference with other teams' pit stops may lead to a penalty.
- Rules with refueling have been clarified. Refueling can begin once the car comes to a complete stop and can continue when it starts leaving provided equipment and/or the fueler does not leave the pit box. Further, no equipment may be tossed or thrown over the wall at any time.
- Weight ballasts must be in block form with a five-pound minimum for each block.
- NASCAR no longer will penalize or monitor missing lug nuts during pit stops, leaving the teams to self-police lug nuts.
- Qualifying session length times will be shortened. At short tracks and intermediates, the three sessions will be 15 minutes, 10 minutes, and 5 minutes in length. Road courses will consist of a 25-minute and a 10-minute session. Restrictor plate qualifying will consist of three 5-minute sessions as was used at the fall 2014 Talladega race.
- NASCAR will use an electronic data log and capture system to increase efficiency of pre-race inspections.

=== In-season changes ===
- Following disastrous crashes at Daytona 500 qualifying, NASCAR implemented a single-car two round qualifying system for restrictor plate races. In round 1, each car goes out one at a time for one warm-up, one timed, and one cool down lap. NASCAR will release the next car to begin their lap while the current car is finishing their timed lap with the goal to have the next car start their timed lap no more than 20 seconds after the previous car finishes. The top 12 cars from round 1 will make a second run in the same format to determine the starting lineup for positions 1–12, with positions 13–43 (as well as any DNQs) determined by round 1 result.
- In an effort to increase competition, NASCAR made rule changes specific to the races at Kentucky, Darlington, Indianapolis, and the August Michigan race.
  - Kentucky and Darlington ran a lower downforce package, featuring a shorter spoiler (reduced from 6 inches to 3.5 inches in height for Kentucky, reduced further to 3 in for Darlington), a shorter splitter (reduced by 1.25 inches at Kentucky and 0.25 inches at Darlington), and a shorter radiator pan (reduced from 38 in to 25 in for both races).
  - Indianapolis and the August Michigan race ran a high drag package, featuring a taller spoiler (9 in. height vertically with a 1 in wicker bill on the top of the spoiler), a 43 in radiator pan, and a 2 in spoiler extension. After complaints of overheating at the Indianapolis event, NASCAR mandated additional cooling holes in the right side window for the Michigan event. Due to concerns about drafting at these events, NASCAR also implemented the single-car qualifying system used at restrictor plate events for these two events.
  - Goodyear was unable to change their tire compounds in time for Kentucky, Indianapolis, and Michigan, but was able to bring a softer tire to complement the package to the Darlington event. After the Darlington event, NASCAR and its teams suggested a similar package to that used at Darlington would be used for the majority of 2016 races.
- Starting at Watkins Glen, teams have the option of using a digital dashboard. The dashboards will be heavily regulated by NASCAR as to what can and cannot be displayed. The first team to use the digital dashboard was Kurt Busch at Darlington. The digital dashboards will be mandated in 2016.
- Starting at the fall Richmond race, NASCAR began to closely review restarts due to drivers jumping the restart.
- On October 20, 2015, NASCAR announced that they will reduce the number of green-white-checkered attempts from 3 attempts to 1 starting at the Chase race at Talladega. This rule will only be used for races at Daytona and Talladega. This led to the addition of the "overtime line" starting in 2016 at all tracks.

== Schedule ==
The final calendar was released on August 26, 2014, comprising 36 races, as well as two exhibition races. The schedule also includes two Budweiser Duels, which are the qualifying races for the Daytona 500.

Key changes from 2014 include:

- The Bojangles' Southern 500 at Darlington Raceway, which traditionally ran on Labor Day Weekend until 2003, returned to its traditional spot in the schedule in 2015.
- The race at Atlanta Motor Speedway moved to the second race of the season, while the spring race at Bristol Motor Speedway (often plagued by bad weather) moved from March to April. This created a three-race "west coast swing" for the third through fifth races of the season, wherein the events at Las Vegas, Phoenix and Auto Club (Fontana) now happened consecutively (as opposed to being broken up by a trip back east to Bristol).
- The Coke Zero 400 at Daytona International Speedway moved to Sunday night at the request of NBC for the re-launch of its coverage. This also removed a conflict with an Independence Day fireworks special traditionally aired by the network.
- A third off-week is added in between the Irwin Tools Night Race at Bristol and the Bojangles' Southern 500 due to the calendar.
- The second off-week has been moved to late-June between the Michigan and Sonoma races instead of the usual late-July break between New Hampshire and Indianapolis. This is to accommodate a Fox scheduling conflict where the U.S. Open and the FIFA Women's World Cup Round of 16 are on the same weekend.
- Charlotte and Kansas swap Chase race dates.
- The mandate of standardized start times was quietly abolished, with some races (especially in the second half of the season) occurring later in the afternoon than normal.

No.	Race title	Track	Date	Time (ET)
	Sprint Unlimited	Daytona International Speedway, Daytona Beach	February 14	8:00 PM
	Budweiser Duels	Daytona International Speedway, Daytona Beach	February 19	7:00 PM
1	Daytona 500	Daytona International Speedway, Daytona Beach	February 22	1:00 PM
2	Folds of Honor QuikTrip 500	Atlanta Motor Speedway, Hampton	March 1	1:00 PM
3	Kobalt 400	Las Vegas Motor Speedway, Las Vegas	March 8	3:30 PM
4	CampingWorld.com 500	Phoenix International Raceway, Avondale	March 15	3:30 PM
5	Auto Club 400	Auto Club Speedway, Fontana	March 22	3:30 PM
6	STP 500	Martinsville Speedway, Ridgeway	March 29	1:00 PM
7	Duck Commander 500	Texas Motor Speedway, Fort Worth	April 11	7:30 PM
8	Food City 500	Bristol Motor Speedway, Bristol	April 19	1:00 PM
9	Toyota Owners 400	Richmond International Raceway, Richmond	April 26†	1:00 PM
10	GEICO 500	Talladega Superspeedway, Lincoln	May 3	1:00 PM
11	SpongeBob SquarePants 400	Kansas Speedway, Kansas City	May 9–10	7:30 PM
	Sprint Showdown	Charlotte Motor Speedway, Concord	May 15	7:00 PM
	NASCAR Sprint All-Star Race	Charlotte Motor Speedway, Concord	May 16	9:00 PM
12	Coca-Cola 600	Charlotte Motor Speedway, Concord	May 24	6:00 PM
13	FedEx 400 benefiting Autism Speaks	Dover International Speedway, Dover	May 31	1:00 PM
14	Axalta "We Paint Winners" 400	Pocono Raceway, Long Pond	June 7	1:00 PM
15	Quicken Loans 400	Michigan International Speedway, Brooklyn	June 14	1:00 PM
16	Toyota/Save Mart 350	Sonoma Raceway, Sonoma	June 28	3:00 PM
17	Coke Zero 400	Daytona International Speedway, Daytona Beach	July 5	7:45 PM
18	Quaker State 400	Kentucky Speedway, Sparta	July 11	7:30 PM
19	5-hour Energy 301	New Hampshire Motor Speedway, Loudon	July 19	1:30 PM
20	Crown Royal presents the Jeff Kyle 400	Indianapolis Motor Speedway, Speedway	July 26	3:30 PM
21	Windows 10 400	Pocono Raceway, Long Pond	August 2	1:30 PM
22	Cheez-It 355 at The Glen	Watkins Glen International, Watkins Glen	August 9	2:00 PM
23	Pure Michigan 400	Michigan International Speedway, Brooklyn	August 16	2:30 PM
24	Irwin Tools Night Race	Bristol Motor Speedway, Bristol	August 22	7:30 PM
25	Bojangles' Southern 500	Darlington Raceway, Darlington	September 6	7:00 PM
26	Federated Auto Parts 400	Richmond International Raceway, Richmond	September 12	7:30 PM
Chase for the Sprint Cup
Round of 16
27	myAFibRisk.com 400	Chicagoland Speedway, Joliet	September 20	3:00 PM
28	Sylvania 300	New Hampshire Motor Speedway, Loudon	September 27	2:00 PM
29	AAA 400	Dover International Speedway, Dover	October 4	2:30 PM
Round of 12
30	Bank of America 500	Charlotte Motor Speedway, Concord	October 11†	12:30 PM
31	Hollywood Casino 400	Kansas Speedway, Kansas City	October 18	2:15 PM
32	CampingWorld.com 500	Talladega Superspeedway, Lincoln	October 25	2:10 PM
Round of 8
33	Goody's Headache Relief Shot 500	Martinsville Speedway, Ridgeway	November 1	1:15 PM
34	AAA Texas 500	Texas Motor Speedway, Fort Worth	November 8	2:00 PM
35	Quicken Loans Race for Heroes 500	Phoenix International Raceway, Avondale	November 15	2:30 PM
Championship 4
36	Ford EcoBoost 400	Homestead-Miami Speedway, Homestead	November 22	3:00 PM
†: The Toyota Owners 400 and Bank of America 500 were postponed a day because of persistent rain.

== Season summary ==
=== Race reports ===
Speedweeks 2015

Speedweeks 2015 started with the Sprint Unlimited. Matt Kenseth won the Sprint Unlimited ahead of Martin Truex Jr. and Carl Edwards in a crash-filled race that saw only 12 of 25 cars finish the race. Following the race, tension arose between Kevin Harvick and Joey Logano over how Logano was racing Harvick in the later part of the race.

Top ten results (Unlimited):

1. #20 - Matt Kenseth
2. #78 - Martin Truex Jr.
3. #19 - Carl Edwards
4. #13 - Casey Mears
5. #42 - Kyle Larson
6. #22 - Joey Logano
7. #24 - Jeff Gordon
8. #18 - Kyle Busch
9. #88 - Dale Earnhardt Jr.
10. #10 - Danica Patrick

Qualifying for the front row of the Daytona 500 took place the following day. Jeff Gordon won the pole for his 23rd and final Daytona 500. His teammate Jimmie Johnson joined him on the front row by qualifying second. Group qualifying was used for the first time, and a multicar crash occurred from Reed Sorenson and Clint Bowyer making contact, which also involved Bobby Labonte, J. J. Yeley, and Denny Hamlin.

The following Thursday, the Budweiser Duels took place to set the remainder of the starting lineup for the Daytona 500. The first duel race was won by Dale Earnhardt Jr., who held off pole-sitter Gordon to take the win. The second duel race was won by Johnson from the pole. During the race, an incident occurred between Hamlin and Danica Patrick which resulted in a confrontation between the two following the race.

Top ten results (Duel 1):

1. #88 - Dale Earnhardt Jr.
2. #24 - Jeff Gordon
3. #22 - Joey Logano
4. #14 - Tony Stewart
5. #15 - Clint Bowyer
6. #4 - Kevin Harvick
7. #5 - Kasey Kahne
8. #1 - Jamie McMurray
9. #40 - Landon Cassill
10. #35 - Cole Whitt

Top ten results (Duel 2):

1. #48 - Jimmie Johnson
2. #18 - Kyle Busch
3. #19 - Carl Edwards
4. #16 - Greg Biffle
5. #78 - Martin Truex Jr.
6. #21 - Ryan Blaney
7. #44 - Reed Sorenson
8. #66 - Mike Wallace
9. #51 - Justin Allgaier
10. #10 - Danica Patrick

The Friday before the Daytona 500, Kurt Busch was indefinitely suspended by NASCAR following possible charges of domestic violence against his former girlfriend Patricia Driscoll. Regan Smith would replace Kurt Busch in the Daytona 500. The day before the race, Kurt's younger brother Kyle Busch broke his right leg and fractured his left foot in an accident in the Alert Today Florida 300 Xfinity Series race where he hit a wall without a SAFER barrier. Matt Crafton replaced Kyle Busch for the Daytona 500, making his Cup debut.

Round 1 - Daytona: Daytona 500

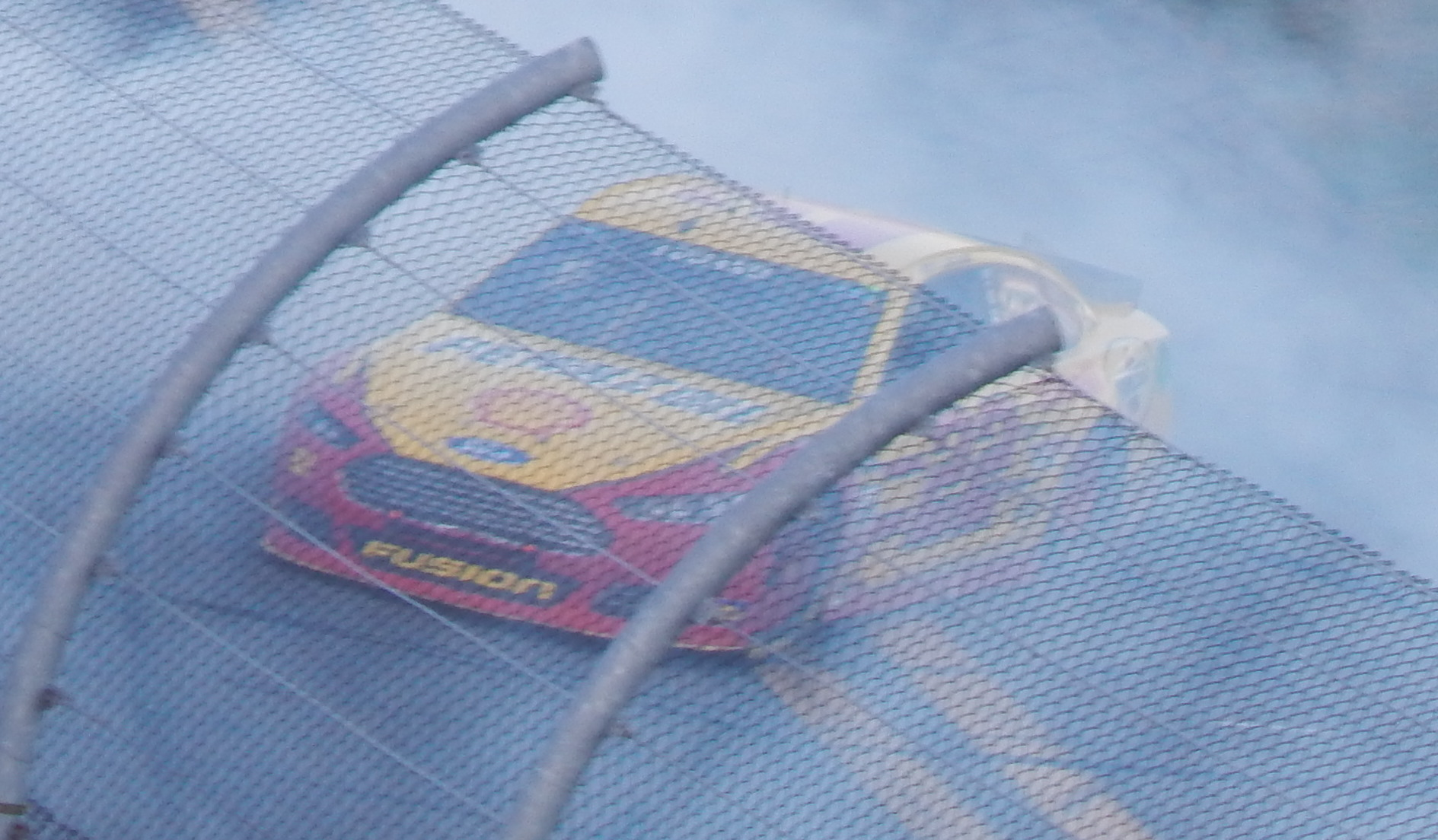
Joey Logano celebrates winning the Daytona 500.

Jeff Gordon started on the pole and led the most laps, but was involved in a late wreck. Another wreck occurred on lap 41 involving Tony Stewart and Matt Kenseth. Brad Keselowski lost an engine with 40 laps to go and caused Jamie McMurray and Ryan Newman to collide with each other. Joey Logano would score his first Daytona 500 win on a two lap dash to the finish.

Top ten results:

1. #22 - Joey Logano
2. #4 - Kevin Harvick
3. #88 - Dale Earnhardt Jr.
4. #11 - Denny Hamlin
5. #48 - Jimmie Johnson
6. #13 - Casey Mears
7. #15 - Clint Bowyer
8. #78 - Martin Truex Jr.
9. #5 - Kasey Kahne
10. #16 - Greg Biffle

Round 2 - Atlanta: Folds of Honor QuikTrip 500

After a delayed start due to rain, Joey Logano led the field to green. Kevin Harvick dominated the first half of the race but would end up finishing second. Jeff Gordon was involved in a multicar accident with Denny Hamlin, Jamie McMurray, and Ryan Newman. Gordon had hit a wall without a SAFER barrier and pointed the issue out to NASCAR. Jimmie Johnson would go on to win the race.

Top ten results:

1. #48 - Jimmie Johnson
2. #4 - Kevin Harvick
3. #88 - Dale Earnhardt Jr.
4. #22 - Joey Logano
5. #20 - Matt Kenseth
6. #78 - Martin Truex Jr.
7. #47 - A. J. Allmendinger
8. #55 - Brett Moffitt
9. #2 - Brad Keselowski
10. #31 - Ryan Newman

Round 3 - Las Vegas: Kobalt 400

Jeff Gordon won the pole but started from the rear in a backup car. Gordon drove to the front but was collected in a wreck with Jeb Burton after Jimmie Johnson got into the wall. Late in the race, Dale Earnhardt Jr. took 2 tires on pit road while Kevin Harvick would take 4 tires. Harvick was able to get around Earnhardt Jr. and score the win.

Top ten results:

1. #4 - Kevin Harvick
2. #78 - Martin Truex Jr.
3. #31 - Ryan Newman
4. #88 - Dale Earnhardt Jr.
5. #11 - Denny Hamlin
6. #47 - A. J. Allmendinger
7. #2 - Brad Keselowski
8. #42 - Kyle Larson
9. #20 - Matt Kenseth
10. #22 - Joey Logano

Round 4 - Phoenix: CampingWorld.com 500

Kevin Harvick started on the pole and dominated the race to score his second straight victory and his fourth straight win at Phoenix. Harvick was followed by Jamie McMurray, Ryan Newman, Kasey Kahne, and Kurt Busch. Kurt Busch made his return to NASCAR following a three-race suspension.

Top ten results:

1. #4 - Kevin Harvick
2. #1 - Jamie McMurray
3. #31 - Ryan Newman
4. #5 - Kasey Kahne
5. #41 - Kurt Busch
6. #2 - Brad Keselowski
7. #78 - Martin Truex Jr.
8. #22 - Joey Logano
9. #24 - Jeff Gordon
10. #42 - Kyle Larson

Round 5 - Fontana: Auto Club 400

Kurt Busch was on the pole and dominated the race. During a green-white-checker finish, Brad Keselowski was able to get around Kurt Busch on the last lap and score the win. Kurt Busch finished third, having been passed by Kevin Harvick for second. Harvick brought his streak of finishing first or second up to eight races dating back to the previous season.

Top ten results:

1. #2 - Brad Keselowski
2. #4 - Kevin Harvick
3. #41 - Kurt Busch
4. #27 - Paul Menard
5. #31 - Ryan Newman
6. #88 - Dale Earnhardt Jr.
7. #22 - Joey Logano
8. #78 - Martin Truex Jr.
9. #48 - Jimmie Johnson
10. #24 - Jeff Gordon

Round 6 - Martinsville: STP 500

Joey Logano started from the pole. Denny Hamlin would come back from a pit road penalty for an uncontrolled tire and score his fifth win at Martinsville, finishing ahead of Brad Keselowski, Logano, Matt Kenseth, and David Ragan. Kevin Harvick finished eighth, ending his streak of top-two finishes. Chase Elliott made his Cup debut, finishing 38th after being involved in a wreck. Kyle Larson missed the race after fainting during an autograph signing the day prior and was replaced by Regan Smith.

Top ten results:

1. #11 - Denny Hamlin
2. #2 - Brad Keselowski
3. #22 - Joey Logano
4. #20 - Matt Kenseth
5. #18 - David Ragan
6. #78 - Martin Truex Jr.
7. #10 - Danica Patrick
8. #4 - Kevin Harvick
9. #24 - Jeff Gordon
10. #1 - Jamie McMurray

Round 7 - Texas: Duck Commander 500

Kurt Busch sat on the pole. Jimmie Johnson would pass Jamie McMurray and Kevin Harvick on the final restart with 20 laps to go to score his second win of the season and his fifth win at Texas. Johnson was followed by Harvick, Dale Earnhardt Jr., Joey Logano, and Brad Keselowski.

Top ten results:

1. #48 - Jimmie Johnson
2. #4 - Kevin Harvick
3. #88 - Dale Earnhardt Jr.
4. #22 - Joey Logano
5. #2 - Brad Keselowski
6. #1 - Jamie McMurray
7. #24 - Jeff Gordon
8. #5 - Kasey Kahne
9. #78 - Martin Truex Jr.
10. #19 - Carl Edwards

Round 8 - Bristol: Food City 500

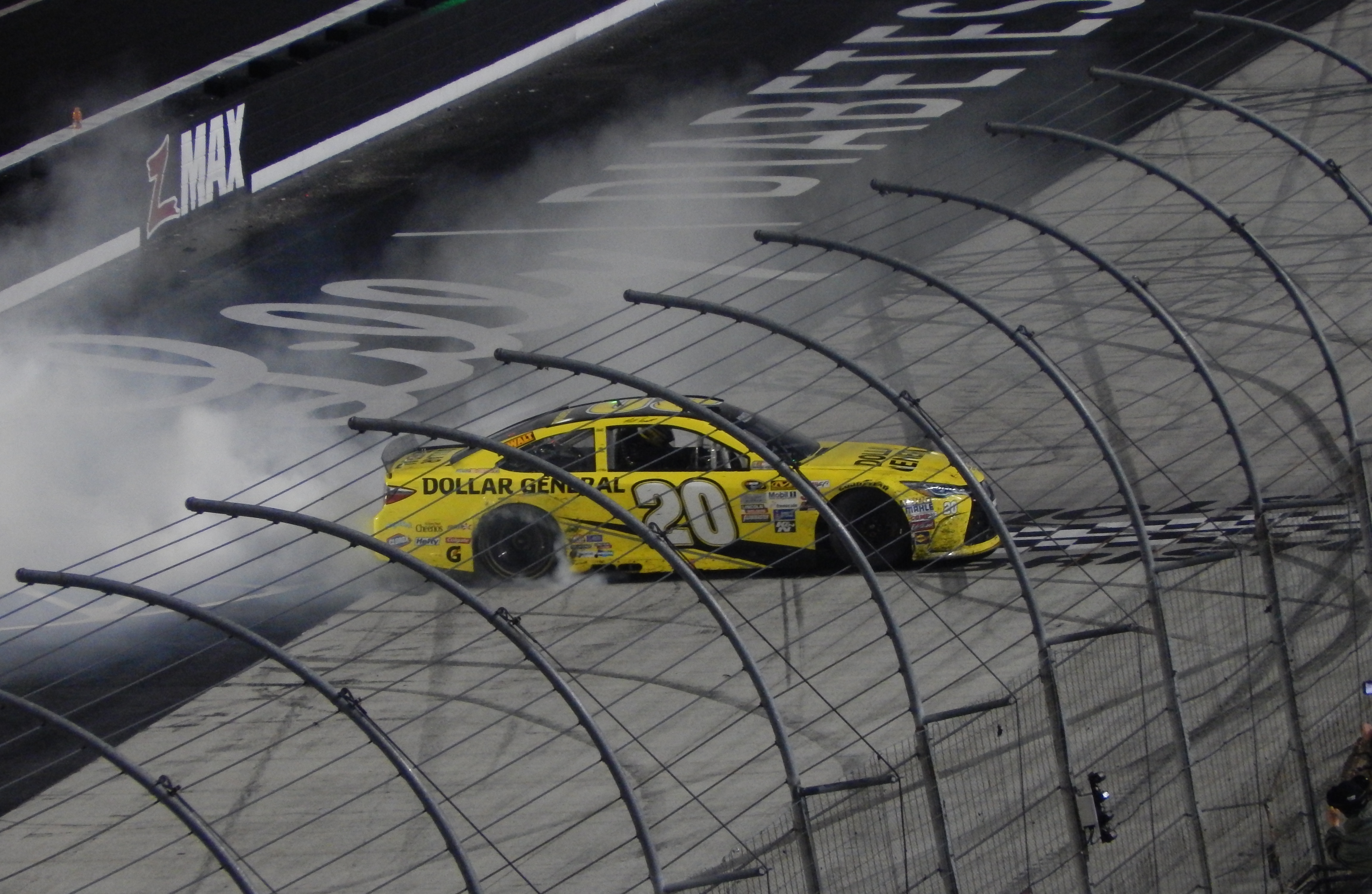
Matt Kenseth celebrating his win in the Food City 500

Matt Kenseth started the race on the pole. The race was red flagged 22 laps in due to rain. During the red flag, Denny Hamlin would be unable to continue in the race due to neck spasms and would be replaced by Erik Jones, who made his unofficial Cup debut. After the race resumed, Kevin Harvick would go on and lead the most laps but would be collected in a wreck with David Ragan that was triggered after Jimmie Johnson and Jeb Burton got into each other. Kenseth would win the race in a green-white-checker finish following a red flag from more rain.

Top ten results:

1. #20 - Matt Kenseth
2. #48 - Jimmie Johnson
3. #24 - Jeff Gordon
4. #17 - Ricky Stenhouse Jr.
5. #31 - Ryan Newman
6. #14 - Tony Stewart
7. #42 - Kyle Larson
8. #51 - Justin Allgaier
9. #10 - Danica Patrick
10. #3 - Austin Dillon

Round 9 - Richmond: Toyota Owners 400

The race was supposed to be held Saturday night but was postponed until Sunday afternoon due to rain. Joey Logano started from the pole position. Kurt Busch took the lead from Logano after a competition caution and dominated the race, scoring the win. Kurt Busch was followed by Kevin Harvick, Jimmie Johnson, Jamie McMurray, and Logano.

Top ten results:

1. #41 - Kurt Busch
2. #4 - Kevin Harvick
3. #48 - Jimmie Johnson
4. #1 - Jamie McMurray
5. #22 - Joey Logano
6. #5 - Kasey Kahne
7. #20 - Matt Kenseth
8. #24 - Jeff Gordon
9. #15 - Clint Bowyer
10. #78 - Martin Truex Jr.

Round 10 - Talladega: GEICO 500

Jeff Gordon won the pole for the race, with qualifying using single car runs instead of group qualifying. The race saw multicar accidents including one on lap 47 that collected 15 cars and a spin by Carl Edwards on the final lap. Dale Earnhardt Jr. would win the race ahead of Jimmie Johnson, scoring his sixth win at Talladega.

Top ten results:

1. #88 - Dale Earnhardt Jr.
2. #48 - Jimmie Johnson
3. #27 - Paul Menard
4. #21 - Ryan Blaney
5. #78 - Martin Truex Jr.
6. #9 - Sam Hornish Jr.
7. #31 - Ryan Newman
8. #4 - Kevin Harvick
9. #11 - Denny Hamlin
10. #98 - Josh Wise

Round 11 - Kansas: SpongeBob SquarePants 400

Joey Logano started the race from the pole. The race was red flagged on lap 98 due to rain. Martin Truex Jr. led the most laps but had to make a late pit stop for fuel, which gave the lead to Jimmie Johnson. Johnson would go on to score his third victory of the season, finishing ahead of Kevin Harvick and Dale Earnhardt Jr., making it the third time this season that the three of them finished 1-2-3. Erik Jones made his official Cup debut and ran up front until he hit the wall with 73 laps to go.

Top ten results:

1. #48 - Jimmie Johnson
2. #4 - Kevin Harvick
3. #88 - Dale Earnhardt Jr.
4. #24 - Jeff Gordon
5. #22 - Joey Logano
6. #20 - Matt Kenseth
7. #2 - Brad Keselowski
8. #41 - Kurt Busch
9. #78 - Martin Truex Jr.
10. #31 - Ryan Newman

Exhibition - Charlotte: NASCAR Sprint All-Star Race

In the Sprint Showdown held the day prior, Greg Biffle won the first segment while Clint Bowyer won the second segment in order to advance to the Sprint All-Star Race. Danica Patrick would win the fan vote in order to participate in the Sprint All-Star Race.

Top ten results (Showdown):

1. #15 - Clint Bowyer
2. #16 - Greg Biffle
3. #27 - Paul Menard
4. #78 - Martin Truex Jr.
5. #9 - Sam Hornish Jr.
6. #25 - Chase Elliott
7. #3 - Austin Dillon
8. #6 - Trevor Bayne
9. #51 - Justin Allgaier
10. #10 - Danica Patrick

Denny Hamlin started the race on the pole. Kasey Kahne would pass Hamlin for the lead and win the first segment. Brad Keselowski would hold the lead throughout the second and third segments. Kurt Busch would take the lead in the fourth segment. After mandatory pit stops, Hamlin would lead the final 10 laps in the fifth segment and win the Sprint All-Star Race. Kyle Busch made his return to NASCAR following the injuries he sustained in the Xfinity Series race at Daytona.

Top ten results:

1. #11 - Denny Hamlin
2. #4 - Kevin Harvick
3. #41 - Kurt Busch
4. #24 - Jeff Gordon
5. #20 - Matt Kenseth
6. #18 - Kyle Busch
7. #5 - Kasey Kahne
8. #22 - Joey Logano
9. #2 - Brad Keselowski
10. #88 - Dale Earnhardt Jr.

Round 12 - Charlotte: Coca-Cola 600

Matt Kenseth started the race from the pole. Jimmie Johnson spun twice during the race, with the second occurrence involving him hitting the pit wall and ending his race. Kurt Busch and Martin Truex Jr. had the strongest cars, but Carl Edwards was able to stretch his fuel mileage at the end of the race and score his first win with Joe Gibbs Racing. Edwards was followed by Greg Biffle, Dale Earnhardt Jr., Kenseth, and Truex Jr.

Top ten results:

1. #19 - Carl Edwards
2. #16 - Greg Biffle
3. #88 - Dale Earnhardt Jr.
4. #20 - Matt Kenseth
5. #78 - Martin Truex Jr.
6. #31 - Ryan Newman
7. #2 - Brad Keselowski
8. #11 - Denny Hamlin
9. #4 - Kevin Harvick
10. #41 - Kurt Busch

Round 13 - Dover: FedEx 400

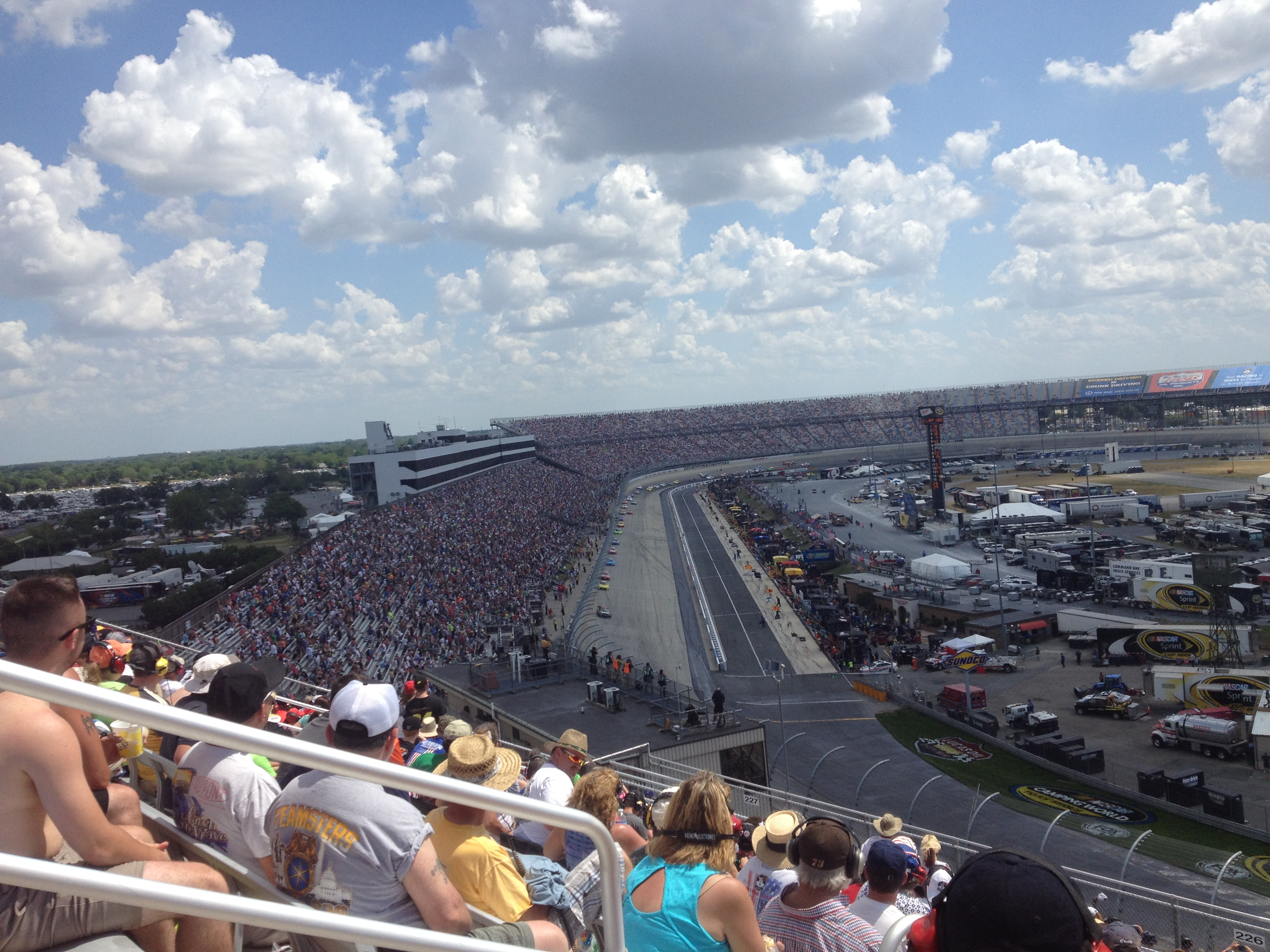
Martin Truex Jr. leads the FedEx 400 at Dover International Speedway in May

Denny Hamlin won the pole for the race. Martin Truex Jr. led the most laps, with Jimmie Johnson and Kevin Harvick also leading laps throughout the race. After multiple late cautions and a green-white-checker finish, Johnson was able to win the race, his fourth win of the season and tenth at Dover. Johnson became one of five drivers to have at least ten wins at a single track.

Top ten results:

1. #48 - Jimmie Johnson
2. #4 - Kevin Harvick
3. #42 - Kyle Larson
4. #5 - Kasey Kahne
5. #43 - Aric Almirola
6. #78 - Martin Truex Jr.
7. #1 - Jamie McMurray
8. #27 - Paul Menard
9. #15 - Clint Bowyer
10. #24 - Jeff Gordon

Round 14 - Pocono: Axalta "We Paint Winners" 400

Kurt Busch was on the pole position. Martin Truex Jr. led the most laps for the fourth straight race and went on to score his first win of the season and his first victory since 2013. Truex Jr. was followed by Kevin Harvick, Jimmie Johnson, Joey Logano, and Kurt Busch.

Top ten results:

1. #78 - Martin Truex Jr.
2. #4 - Kevin Harvick
3. #48 - Jimmie Johnson
4. #22 - Joey Logano
5. #41 - Kurt Busch
6. #20 - Matt Kenseth
7. #1 - Jamie McMurray
8. #42 - Kyle Larson
9. #18 - Kyle Busch
10. #11 - Denny Hamlin

Round 15 - Michigan: Quicken Loans 400

Kasey Kahne started the race from the pole. The race saw four red flags due to rain. During the race, Kevin Harvick fell two laps down after a flat tire and Kyle Busch finished last after hitting the wall. After the fourth red flag, the race was called and Kurt Busch was awarded the win, his second of the season. The remainder of the top five included Dale Earnhardt Jr., Martin Truex Jr., Matt Kenseth, and Joey Logano.

Top ten results:

1. #41 - Kurt Busch
2. #88 - Dale Earnhardt Jr.
3. #78 - Martin Truex Jr.
4. #20 - Matt Kenseth
5. #22 - Joey Logano
6. #2 - Brad Keselowski
7. #1 - Jamie McMurray
8. #27 - Paul Menard
9. #6 - Trevor Bayne
10. #15 - Clint Bowyer

Round 16 - Sonoma: Toyota/Save Mart 350

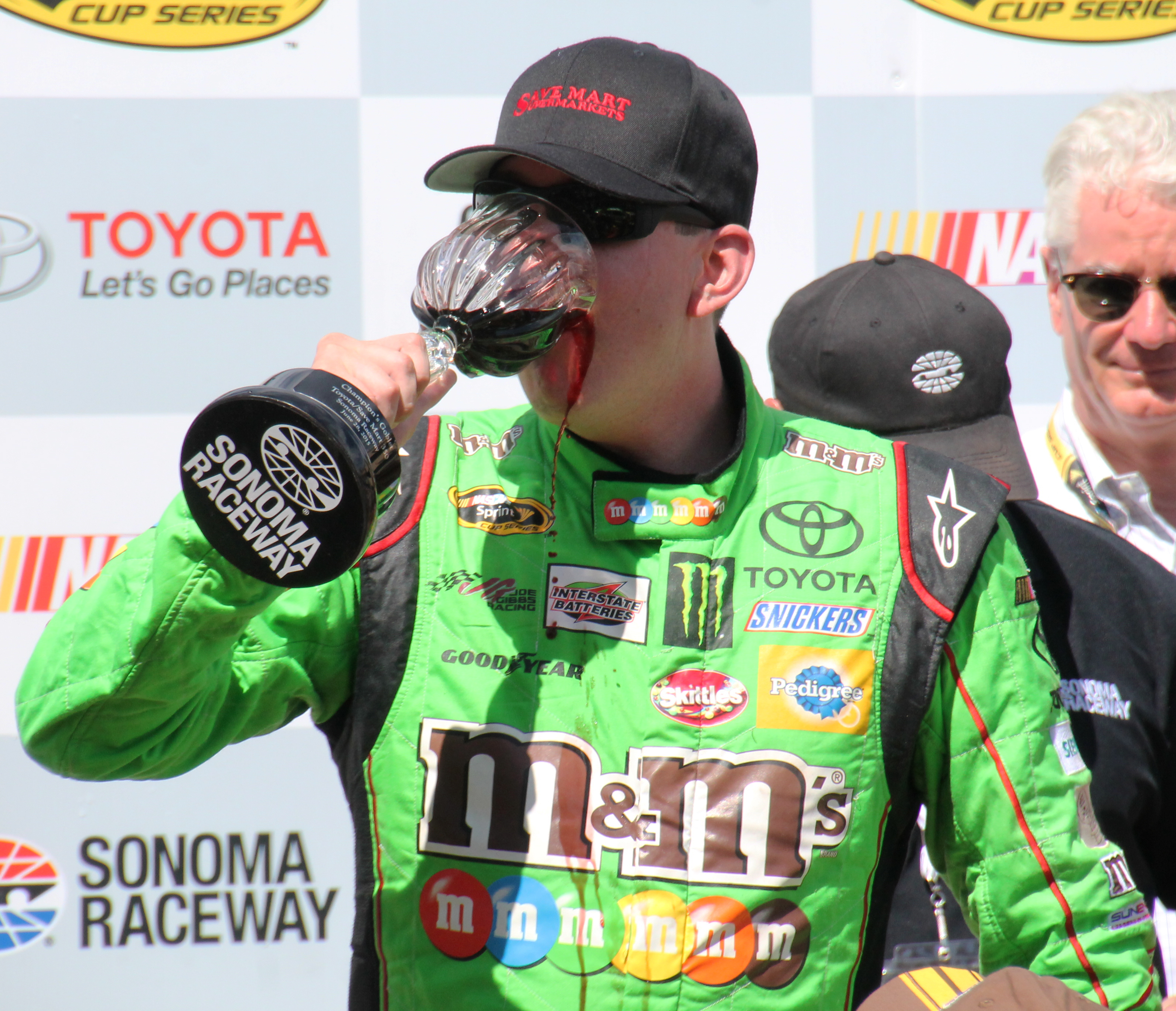
Kyle Busch celebrates his victory in the Toyota/Save Mart 350

A. J. Allmendinger started on the pole but would finish 37th after an issue with the fuel system on his car. Jimmie Johnson led the most laps in the race. On a late caution on lap 100, Kyle Busch pitted for four tires while Johnson stayed out. Kyle Busch was able to get around Johnson and score his first win of the season. Kurt Busch finished the race in second, making it the first time the Busch brothers both finished in the top two in a race.

Top ten results:

1. #18 - Kyle Busch
2. #41 - Kurt Busch
3. #15 - Clint Bowyer
4. #4 - Kevin Harvick
5. #22 - Joey Logano
6. #48 - Jimmie Johnson
7. #88 - Dale Earnhardt Jr.
8. #5 - Kasey Kahne
9. #31 - Ryan Newman
10. #9 - Sam Hornish Jr.

Round 17 - Daytona: Coke Zero 400

Dale Earnhardt Jr. started the race from pole after qualifying was rained out and the field set by practice speeds. The start of the race was delayed four hours by rain, running early into the following Monday. Several multicar accidents occurred throughout the race. Earnhardt Jr. dominated the race and took the win in a green-white-checker finish as "The Big One" happened at the finish line, resulting in Austin Dillon flying into the catchfence. Dillon was uninjured in the wreck save for some bruises.

- This was Jimmie Johnson's last second-place finish.

Top ten results:

1. #88 - Dale Earnhardt Jr.
2. #48 - Jimmie Johnson
3. #11 - Denny Hamlin
4. #4 - Kevin Harvick
5. #41 - Kurt Busch
6. #24 - Jeff Gordon
7. #3 - Austin Dillon
8. #31 - Ryan Newman
9. #6 - Trevor Bayne
10. #15 - Clint Bowyer

Round 18 - Kentucky: Quaker State 400

Kyle Larson was on the pole after qualifying was rained out. The race saw the debut of a new rules package that reduced the downforce of the cars, which allowed for more side-by-side racing and passing. Kyle Busch dominated the race and got by Joey Logano with 19 laps remaining to score his second win of the season. Logano finished second, followed by Joe Gibbs Racing drivers Denny Hamlin, Carl Edwards, and Matt Kenseth. All four Joe Gibbs Racing drivers finished the race in the top five led by Kyle Busch.

Top ten results:

1. #18 - Kyle Busch
2. #22 - Joey Logano
3. #11 - Denny Hamlin
4. #19 - Carl Edwards
5. #20 - Matt Kenseth
6. #2 - Brad Keselowski
7. #24 - Jeff Gordon
8. #4 - Kevin Harvick
9. #48 - Jimmie Johnson
10. #41 - Kurt Busch

Round 19 - Loudon: 5-hour Energy 301

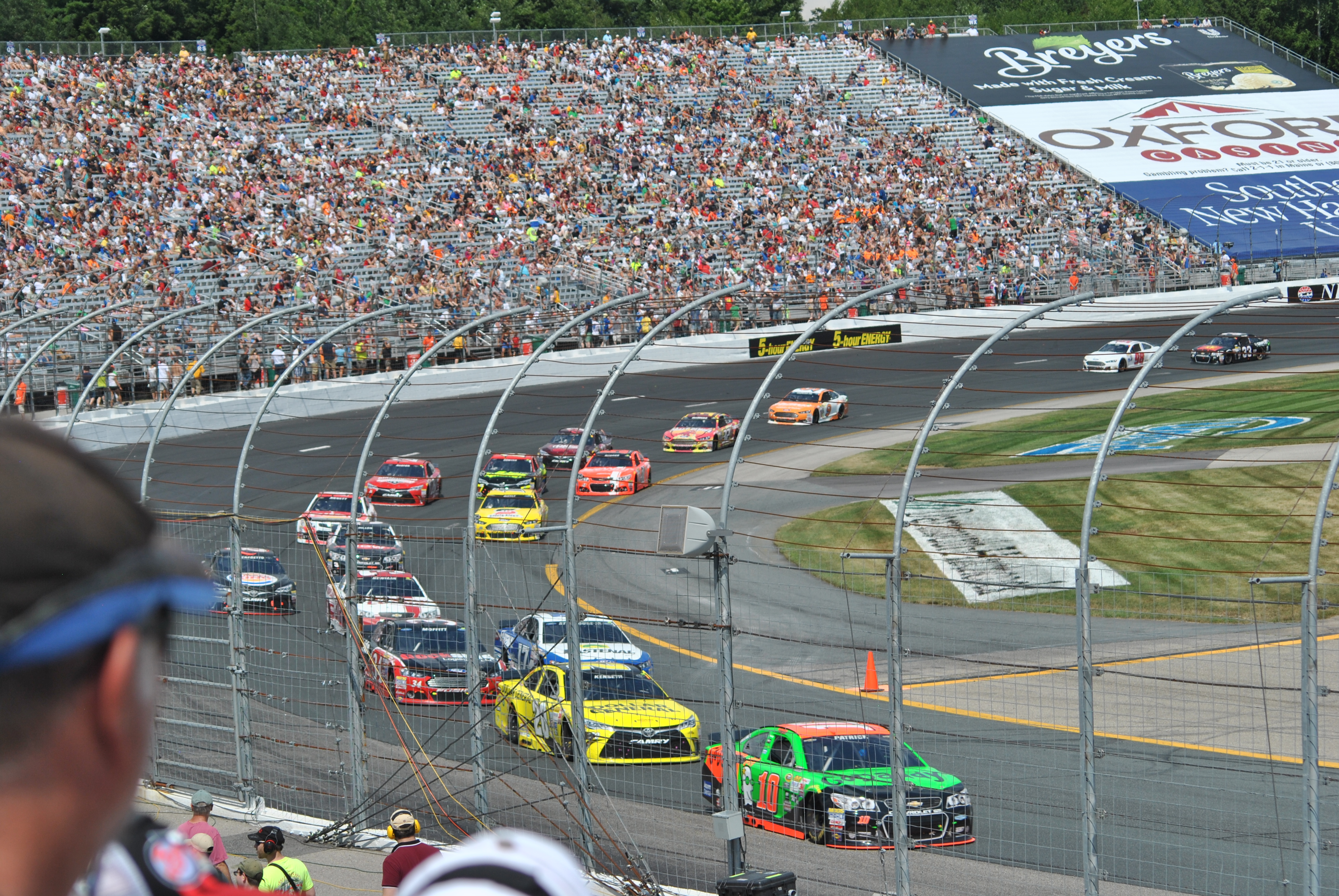
The 5-hour Energy 301 at New Hampshire Motor Speedway in July

Carl Edwards started the race on the pole. Brad Keselowski went on to lead the most laps in the race. Kyle Busch made a pit stop under green flag conditions shortly before a caution came out. The leaders pitted, while Kyle Busch took over the race lead and went on for his second straight win and third of the season. Kyle Busch was followed by Keselowski, Kevin Harvick, Joey Logano, and Dale Earnhardt Jr.

Top ten results:

1. #18 - Kyle Busch
2. #2 - Brad Keselowski
3. #4 - Kevin Harvick
4. #22 - Joey Logano
5. #88 - Dale Earnhardt Jr.
6. #20 - Matt Kenseth
7. #19 - Carl Edwards
8. #3 - Austin Dillon
9. #24 - Jeff Gordon
10. #41 - Kurt Busch

Round 20 - Indianapolis: Brickyard 400

Carl Edwards won the pole for the race. The race featured a higher drag rules package intended to increase passing and drafting. Jeff Gordon was caught up in a wreck with Clint Bowyer, ending his chance to win his final Brickyard 400. Kyle Busch passed Kevin Harvick on a restart with 8 laps left in the race and was able to survive two restarts, including a green-white-checker finish, to win the race. This was Kyle Busch's third straight win and fourth in the past five races, moving him closer to the top 30 in points, which he needed to be in to be eligible for the Chase. Kyle Busch also completed a weekend sweep as he won the Xfinity Series race the day before. Joey Logano finished in second, followed by Harvick, Martin Truex Jr., and Denny Hamlin.

Top ten results:

1. #18 - Kyle Busch
2. #22 - Joey Logano
3. #4 - Kevin Harvick
4. #78 - Martin Truex Jr.
5. #11 - Denny Hamlin
6. #15 - Clint Bowyer
7. #20 - Matt Kenseth
8. #41 - Kurt Busch
9. #42 - Kyle Larson
10. #2 - Brad Keselowski

Round 21 - Pocono: Windows 10 400

Kyle Busch started the race from the pole position. Early in the race, Kasey Kahne hit the pit road wall and Kevin Harvick blew an engine. Toward the end of the race, several drivers gambled on fuel mileage. Joey Logano was leading but ran out of fuel with two laps to go. Kyle Busch took the lead and came to the white flag, but ran out of fuel on the final lap. Matt Kenseth was able to pass Kyle Busch and take the win, his second win of the season.

Top ten results:

1. #20 - Matt Kenseth
2. #2 - Brad Keselowski
3. #24 - Jeff Gordon
4. #88 - Dale Earnhardt Jr.
5. #16 - Greg Biffle
6. #48 - Jimmie Johnson
7. #47 - A. J. Allmendinger
8. #15 - Clint Bowyer
9. #14 - Tony Stewart
10. #19 - Carl Edwards

Round 22 - Watkins Glen: Cheez-It 355 at The Glen

A. J. Allmendinger started on the pole, but his day was plagued with a poor-handling car and his engine shutting off and not refiring on lap 51. Several wrecks and incidents happened throughout the race. Toward the end of the race, Kevin Harvick was leading but stretching his fuel mileage. Harvick ran out of fuel on the final turn and was passed by Joey Logano for the win. Logano completed a weekend sweep as he won the preceding day's Xfinity Series race. Kyle Busch passed Harvick for second and cracked the top 30 in points. Harvick ended up finishing the race in third.

Top ten results:

1. #22 - Joey Logano
2. #18 - Kyle Busch
3. #4 - Kevin Harvick
4. #20 - Matt Kenseth
5. #41 - Kurt Busch
6. #15 - Clint Bowyer
7. #2 - Brad Keselowski
8. #19 - Carl Edwards
9. #9 - Sam Hornish Jr.
10. #48 - Jimmie Johnson

Round 23 - Michigan: Pure Michigan 400

Matt Kenseth dominated the race by winning the pole, leading the most laps, and scoring his third win of the season. Kenseth was followed by Kevin Harvick, Martin Truex Jr., Austin Dillon (who had a career-best finish), and Denny Hamlin. During the race, Clint Bowyer was spun by Ryan Newman and hit the walls while Jimmie Johnson cut a tire and had multiple pit road issues.

Top ten results:

1. #20 - Matt Kenseth
2. #4 - Kevin Harvick
3. #78 - Martin Truex Jr.
4. #3 - Austin Dillon
5. #11 - Denny Hamlin
6. #19 - Carl Edwards
7. #22 - Joey Logano
8. #31 - Ryan Newman
9. #2 - Brad Keselowski
10. #88 - Dale Earnhardt Jr.

Round 24 - Bristol: Irwin Tools Night Race

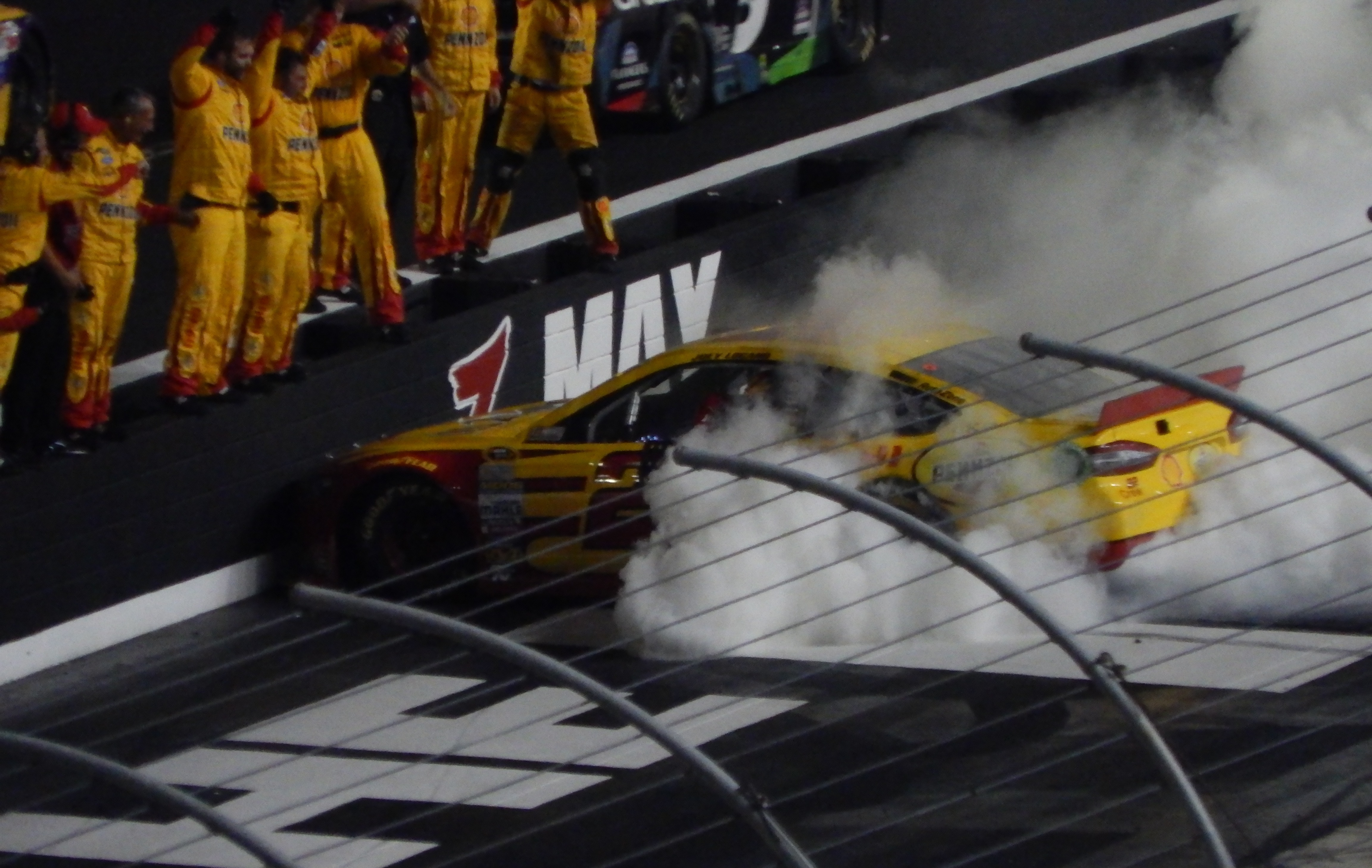
Joey Logano celebrates winning the Irwin Tools Night Race.

Denny Hamlin started from the pole position. During the race, several incidents occurred, such as Matt Kenseth losing an engine and Kyle Larson hitting the wall. Drivers also had issues on pit road throughout the race. Joey Logano held off Kevin Harvick in the closing laps and won the race, his third of the season and second consecutive in the summer Bristol race.

Top ten results:

1. #22 - Joey Logano
2. #4 - Kevin Harvick
3. #11 - Denny Hamlin
4. #48 - Jimmie Johnson
5. #15 - Clint Bowyer
6. #2 - Brad Keselowski
7. #19 - Carl Edwards
8. #18 - Kyle Busch
9. #88 - Dale Earnhardt Jr.
10. #31 - Ryan Newman

Round 25 - Darlington: Bojangles' Southern 500

Brad Keselowski began the race from the pole. The race utilized the low downforce package. In addition, to celebrate the return of Darlington to Labor Day weekend, several drivers ran throwback paint schemes. The race saw a record of 18 cautions, including several single car spins, and saw a lot of battles for position. Carl Edwards came back from two laps down to battle Keselowski and Kevin Harvick for the lead. After a late caution, Edwards got the lead on pit road and went on to win his second race of the season. The top five was rounded out by Keselowski, Denny Hamlin, Joey Logano, and Harvick.

Top ten results:

1. #19 - Carl Edwards
2. #2 - Brad Keselowski
3. #11 - Denny Hamlin
4. #22 - Joey Logano
5. #4 - Kevin Harvick
6. #41 - Kurt Busch
7. #18 - Kyle Busch
8. #88 - Dale Earnhardt Jr.
9. #78 - Martin Truex Jr.
10. #42 - Kyle Larson

Round 26 - Richmond: Federated Auto Parts 400

In the last race before the Chase for the Sprint Cup, Joey Logano started from the pole. The four Joe Gibbs Racing cars ran strong throughout the race, with all four cars in the top four spots at one point. Matt Kenseth led the most laps and went on to his fourth win of the season. Kenseth was followed by Kyle Busch, Logano, Aric Almirola, and Dale Earnhardt Jr. Despite the fourth-place finish, Almirola was the first driver below the cutoff line for the Chase.

Top ten results:

1. #20 - Matt Kenseth
2. #18 - Kyle Busch
3. #22 - Joey Logano
4. #43 - Aric Almirola
5. #88 - Dale Earnhardt Jr.
6. #11 - Denny Hamlin
7. #24 - Jeff Gordon
8. #2 - Brad Keselowski
9. #48 - Jimmie Johnson
10. #15 - Clint Bowyer

Round 27 Joliet: myAFibRisk.com 400

For the first race in the Challenger Round of the Chase for the Sprint Cup, Kevin Harvick was awarded the pole after qualifying was rained out. Denny Hamlin was involved in a spin on lap 2 but worked his way back to the front. On a restart, Chase contenders Jimmie Johnson and Kevin Harvick made contact, with Harvick cutting a tire and hitting the wall to finish 42nd. On a late caution, Hamlin opted to stay out while most of the leaders came to pit road. Hamlin was able to get the lead on the restart and win the race, his second of the season and securing a spot in the next round of the Chase. After the race, Harvick confronted Johnson and attempted to shove him before he was restrained.

Top ten results:

1. #11 - Denny Hamlin
2. #19 - Carl Edwards
3. #41 - Kurt Busch
4. #31 - Ryan Newman
5. #20 - Matt Kenseth
6. #22 - Joey Logano
7. #42 - Kyle Larson
8. #2 - Brad Keselowski
9. #18 - Kyle Busch
10. #43 - Aric Almirola

Round 28 - Loudon: Sylvania 300

Carl Edwards was on the pole position. During the race, Chase contenders had trouble including Kyle Busch, who hit the wall after cutting a tire, and Brad Keselowski, who was black flagged for jumping a restart. Kevin Harvick dominated the race and led the most laps but was trying to save fuel to make it to the finish. Harvick ran out of fuel with 3 laps to go and Matt Kenseth passed him to win the race, his fifth win of the season that would advance him to the next round of the Chase.

Top ten results:

1. #20 - Matt Kenseth
2. #11 - Denny Hamlin
3. #22 - Joey Logano
4. #16 - Greg Biffle
5. #19 - Carl Edwards
6. #48 - Jimmie Johnson
7. #24 - Jeff Gordon
8. #78 - Martin Truex Jr.
9. #5 - Kasey Kahne
10. #31 - Ryan Newman

Round 29 - Dover: AAA 400

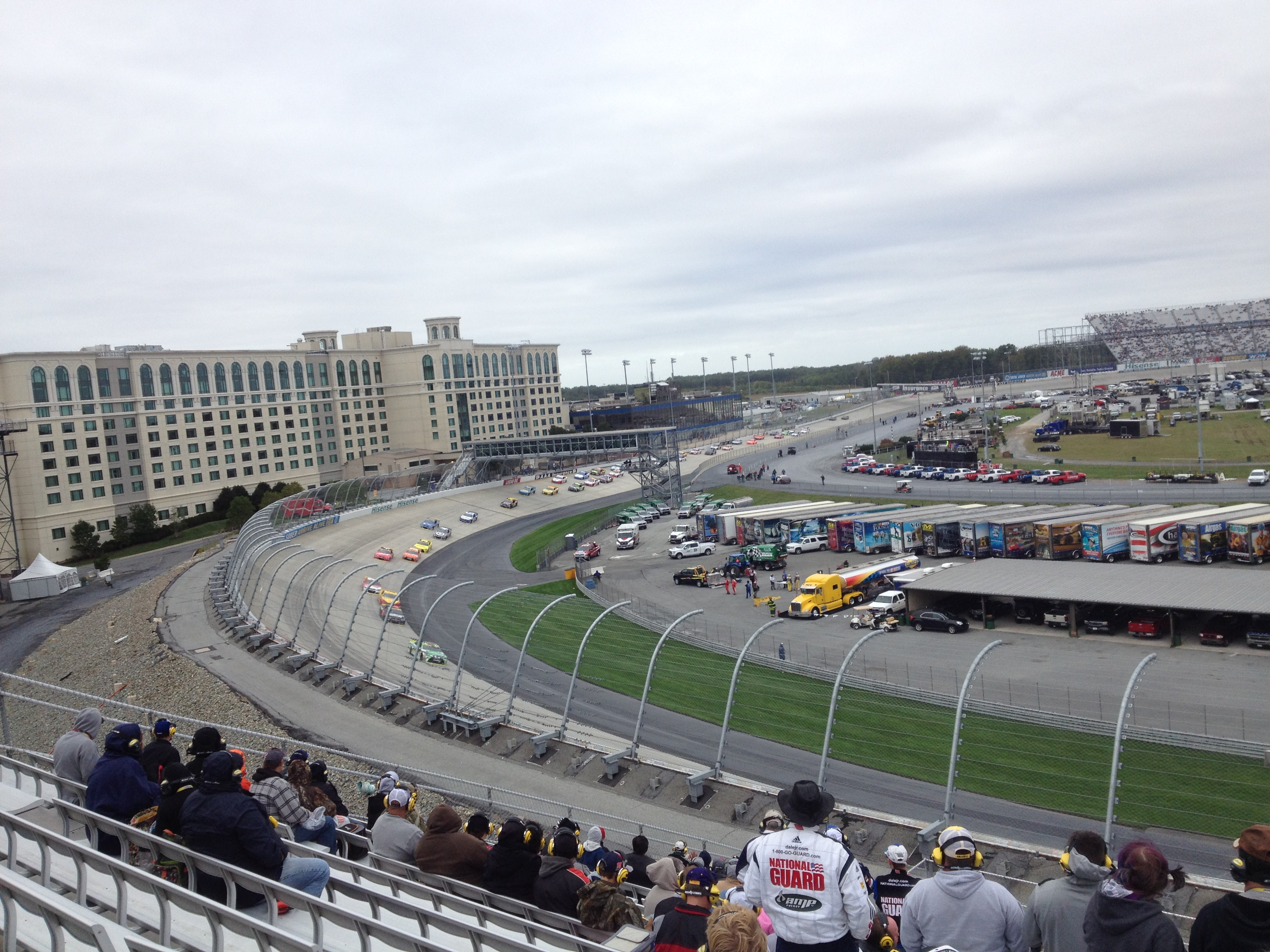
Kyle Busch leads the AAA 400 at Dover International Speedway in October

For the final race in the Challenger Round, Matt Kenseth started the race on the pole as both practice and qualifying were rained out and he was the points leader. Kevin Harvick dominated the race and went on to win his third race of the season. With the win, Harvick was able to advance to the next round of the Chase as he was in a must-win situation following his poor finishes at Chicagoland and New Hampshire. Jimmie Johnson broke a rear axle on lap 100 and spent time in the garage for repairs, finishing 41st. Following the race, Jamie McMurray, Johnson, Paul Menard, and Clint Bowyer were eliminated from the Chase.

Top ten results:

1. #4 - Kevin Harvick
2. #18 - Kyle Busch
3. #88 - Dale Earnhardt Jr.
4. #1 - Jamie McMurray
5. #43 - Aric Almirola
6. #5 - Kasey Kahne
7. #20 - Matt Kenseth
8. #17 - Ricky Stenhouse Jr.
9. #42 - Kyle Larson
10. #22 - Joey Logano

Round 30 - Charlotte: Bank of America 500

This race marked the beginning of the Contender Round of the Chase. The race was planned to be run on Saturday night but was postponed to Sunday afternoon because of rain. Matt Kenseth led the field to the green flag and was strong in the early part of the race. Kenseth would later fall back and hit the wall multiple times, ending the race in 42nd. Kyle Busch and Kyle Larson had a collision coming to pit road under caution. Dale Earnhardt Jr. got into the wall and fell off the lead lap. Joey Logano dominated the later part of the race and went on to score the win, advancing to the Eliminator Round.

Top ten results:

1. #22 - Joey Logano
2. #4 - Kevin Harvick
3. #78 - Martin Truex Jr.
4. #11 - Denny Hamlin
5. #41 - Kurt Busch
6. #19 - Carl Edwards
7. #3 - Austin Dillon
8. #24 - Jeff Gordon
9. #2 - Brad Keselowski
10. #43 - Aric Almirola

Round 31 - Kansas: Hollywood Casino 400

Brad Keselowski started the race from the pole. During the race, Dale Earnhardt Jr. struggled with a loose wheel. Matt Kenseth led the most laps in the race. In the closing laps, Joey Logano caught up to Kenseth and battled him for the win. With 4 laps to go, Logano spun Kenseth, setting up a green-white-checker finish. Logano continued on and won his second straight race, putting Kenseth into a must-win situation at Talladega to advance. Kenseth felt that Logano was wrong for spinning him.

Top ten results:

1. #22 - Joey Logano
2. #11 - Denny Hamlin
3. #48 - Jimmie Johnson
4. #5 - Kasey Kahne
5. #18 - Kyle Busch
6. #41 - Kurt Busch
7. #21 - Ryan Blaney
8. #19 - Carl Edwards
9. #2 - Brad Keselowski
10. #24 - Jeff Gordon

Round 32 - Talladega: CampingWorld.com 500 at Talladega

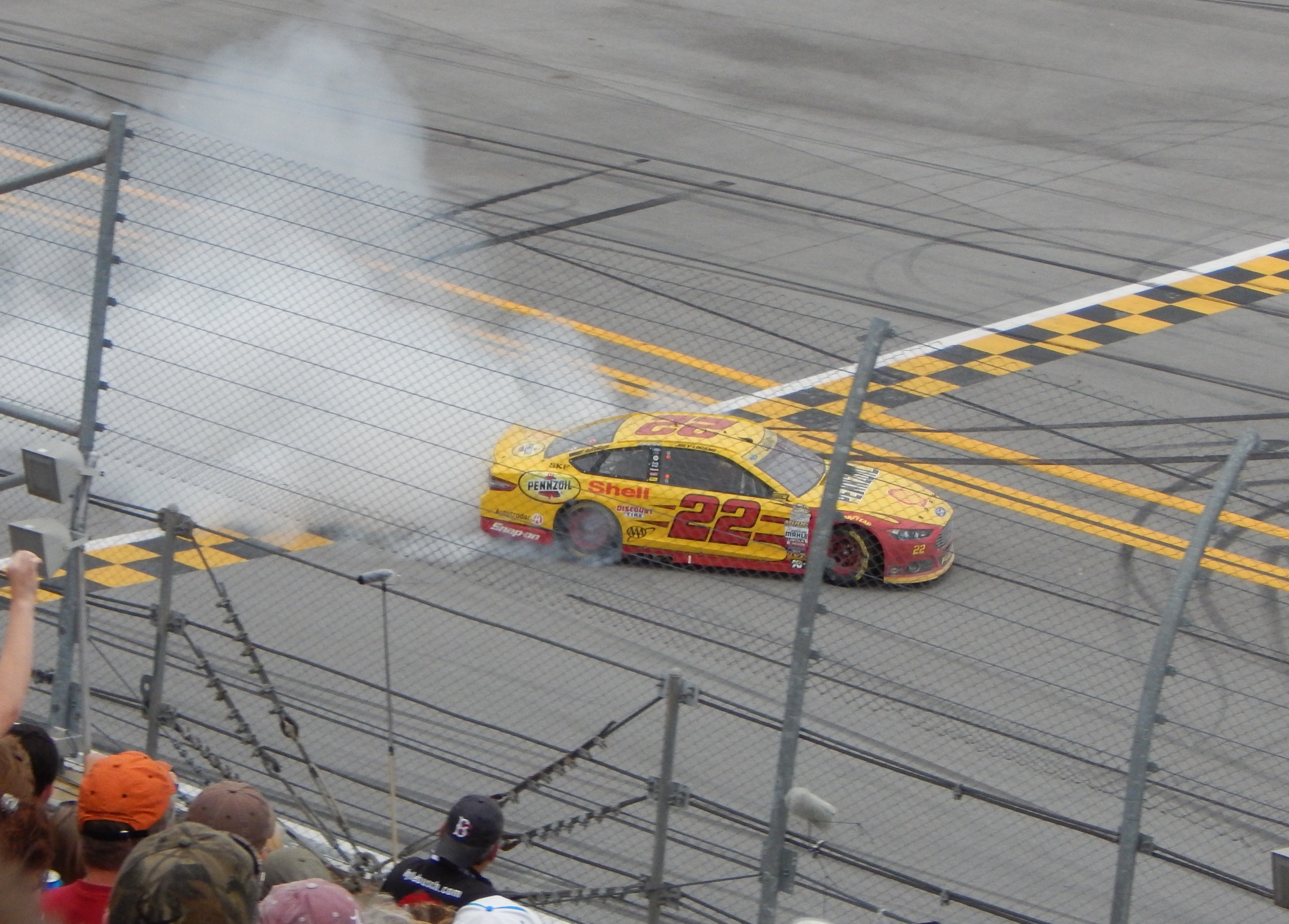
Joey Logano celebrates winning the CampingWorld.com 500 at Talladega

For the final race in the Contender Round, Jeff Gordon won the pole position. For this race, NASCAR announced that there would only be one attempt at a green-white-checker finish instead of the usual three. During the race, Denny Hamlin had a loose roof escape hatch door and was forced to make repairs, putting him off the lead lap. Dale Earnhardt Jr. had a strong car and was contending with Joey Logano for the win late in the race. The race went to a green-white-checker finish after Jamie McMurray blew an engine. On the attempted restart, Jimmie Johnson and Kyle Larson wrecked and the restart was waved off. On the restart, Kevin Harvick was losing an engine and caused a large wreck, resulting in the race to end under caution. NASCAR had determined that Logano was ahead of Earnhardt Jr. at the moment the caution came out, and Logano was declared the winner, sweeping all three races in the Contender Round. Hamlin, Ryan Newman, Earnhardt Jr., and Matt Kenseth were the four drivers eliminated from the Chase.

Top ten results:

1. #22 - Joey Logano
2. #88 - Dale Earnhardt Jr.
3. #24 - Jeff Gordon
4. #2 - Brad Keselowski
5. #19 - Carl Edwards
6. #27 - Paul Menard
7. #78 - Martin Truex Jr.
8. #15 - Clint Bowyer
9. #17 - Ricky Stenhouse Jr.
10. #41 - Kurt Busch

Round 33 - Martinsville: Goody's Headache Relief Shot 500

This race kicked off the Eliminator Round of the Chase. Joey Logano started the race from the pole and would dominate most of the race. With 66 laps to go, Chase contenders Brad Keselowski and Kurt Busch along with Matt Kenseth were involved in a wreck. Following this, Kenseth, who was laps down, intentionally wrecked race leader Logano on lap 454 as revenge for the incident at Kansas two weeks prior. After Logano was wrecked, Jeff Gordon would take the lead and continue on to win his 93rd and final career victory ahead of Jamie McMurray. With the win, Jeff Gordon would become one of the four drivers to race for the championship at Homestead, doing so in the final race of his full-time race. Following the race, Kenseth would be suspended for two races for intentionally wrecking Logano, with Erik Jones replacing Kenseth for those two races.

Top ten results:

1. #24 - Jeff Gordon
2. #1 - Jamie McMurray
3. #11 - Denny Hamlin
4. #88 - Dale Earnhardt Jr.
5. #18 - Kyle Busch
6. #78 - Martin Truex Jr.
7. #31 - Ryan Newman
8. #4 - Kevin Harvick
9. #5 - Kasey Kahne
10. #14 - Tony Stewart

Round 34 - Texas: AAA Texas 500

Brad Keselowski started on pole and led 312 of the 334 laps in the race. Chase contender Joey Logano spun from a cut tire 10 laps into the race and suffered major damage to his car, forcing him into a must-win situation at Phoenix. A number of other drivers suffered tire issues in the race including Chase contender Kevin Harvick. In the final laps of the race, Jimmie Johnson battled Keselowski for the lead, passing him with 3 laps to go. Johnson went on to win the race, his sixth win at Texas. Keselowski finished in second, followed by Harvick, Kyle Busch, and Carl Edwards.

Top ten results:

1. #48 - Jimmie Johnson
2. #2 - Brad Keselowski
3. #4 - Kevin Harvick
4. #18 - Kyle Busch
5. #19 - Carl Edwards
6. #88 - Dale Earnhardt Jr.
7. #41 - Kurt Busch
8. #78 - Martin Truex Jr.
9. #24 - Jeff Gordon
10. #1 - Jamie McMurray

Round 35 - Phoenix: Quicken Loans Race for Heroes 500

In the final race of the Eliminator Round, Jimmie Johnson started from the pole. The start of the race was delayed by rain. Kevin Harvick dominated most of the race. During a round of green flag pit stops, the caution came out for a wreck involving Joey Gase. At the moment of caution, Dale Earnhardt Jr. was determined to be the leader. During the caution, it started to rain and the race was eventually red flagged. The race never resumed and Earnhardt Jr. was declared the winner, the 26th and final victory of his Cup Series career. Following the race, Jeff Gordon, Kyle Busch, Harvick, and Martin Truex Jr. advanced to race for a championship at Homestead while Carl Edwards, Joey Logano, Brad Keselowski, and Kurt Busch were eliminated from the Chase.

Top ten results:

1. #88 - Dale Earnhardt Jr.
2. #4 - Kevin Harvick
3. #22 - Joey Logano
4. #18 - Kyle Busch
5. #48 - Jimmie Johnson
6. #24 - Jeff Gordon
7. #41 - Kurt Busch
8. #11 - Denny Hamlin
9. #2 - Brad Keselowski
10. #43 - Aric Almirola

Round 36 - Homestead: Ford EcoBoost 400

Denny Hamlin started the race from the pole position, while championship contenders Kyle Busch started 3rd, Jeff Gordon 5th, Martin Truex Jr. 11th, and Kevin Harvick 13th. Through most of the race, Kyle Busch ran ahead of the other three championship contenders. Brad Keselowski led the most laps and held the lead going toward the end of the race when a debris caution came out, with the leaders coming to pit road. On the restart, Kyle Busch and Harvick got around Keselowski. Kyle Busch held off Harvick to win both the race and the 2015 NASCAR Sprint Cup championship.

Top ten results:

1. #18 - Kyle Busch
2. #4 - Kevin Harvick
3. #2 - Brad Keselowski
4. #22 - Joey Logano
5. #42 - Kyle Larson
6. #24 - Jeff Gordon
7. #20 - Matt Kenseth
8. #41 - Kurt Busch
9. #48 - Jimmie Johnson
10. #11 - Denny Hamlin

== Results and standings ==
=== Races ===
No.	Race	Pole position	Most laps led	Winning driver	Manufacturer	Report
	Sprint Unlimited	Paul Menard	Martin Truex Jr.	Matt Kenseth	Toyota	Report
	Budweiser Duel 1	Jeff Gordon	Matt Kenseth	Dale Earnhardt Jr.	Chevrolet	Report
	Budweiser Duel 2	Jimmie Johnson	Jimmie Johnson	Jimmie Johnson	Chevrolet	Report
1	Daytona 500	Jeff Gordon	Jeff Gordon	Joey Logano	Ford	Report
2	Folds of Honor QuikTrip 500	Joey Logano	Kevin Harvick	Jimmie Johnson	Chevrolet	Report
3	Kobalt 400	Jeff Gordon	Kevin Harvick	Kevin Harvick	Chevrolet	Report
4	CampingWorld.com 500	Kevin Harvick	Kevin Harvick	Kevin Harvick	Chevrolet	Report
5	Auto Club 400	Kurt Busch	Kurt Busch	Brad Keselowski	Ford	Report
6	STP 500	Joey Logano	Kevin Harvick	Denny Hamlin	Toyota	Report
7	Duck Commander 500	Kurt Busch	Jimmie Johnson	Jimmie Johnson	Chevrolet	Report
8	Food City 500	Matt Kenseth	Kevin Harvick	Matt Kenseth	Toyota	Report
9	Toyota Owners 400	Joey Logano	Kurt Busch	Kurt Busch	Chevrolet	Report
10	GEICO 500	Jeff Gordon	Dale Earnhardt Jr.	Dale Earnhardt Jr.	Chevrolet	Report
11	SpongeBob SquarePants 400	Joey Logano	Martin Truex Jr.	Jimmie Johnson	Chevrolet	Report
	NASCAR Sprint All-Star Race	Denny Hamlin	Brad Keselowski	Denny Hamlin	Toyota	Report
12	Coca-Cola 600	Matt Kenseth	Martin Truex Jr.	Carl Edwards	Toyota	Report
13	FedEx 400	Denny Hamlin	Martin Truex Jr.	Jimmie Johnson	Chevrolet	Report
14	Axalta "We Paint Winners" 400	Kurt Busch	Martin Truex Jr.	Martin Truex Jr.	Chevrolet	Report
15	Quicken Loans 400	Kasey Kahne	Kevin Harvick	Kurt Busch	Chevrolet	Report
16	Toyota/Save Mart 350	A. J. Allmendinger	Jimmie Johnson	Kyle Busch	Toyota	Report
17	Coke Zero 400	Dale Earnhardt Jr.	Dale Earnhardt Jr.	Dale Earnhardt Jr.	Chevrolet	Report
18	Quaker State 400	Kyle Larson	Kyle Busch	Kyle Busch	Toyota	Report
19	5-hour Energy 301	Carl Edwards	Brad Keselowski	Kyle Busch	Toyota	Report
20	Brickyard 400	Carl Edwards	Kevin Harvick	Kyle Busch	Toyota	Report
21	Windows 10 400	Kyle Busch	Joey Logano	Matt Kenseth	Toyota	Report
22	Cheez-It 355 at The Glen	A. J. Allmendinger	Kevin Harvick	Joey Logano	Ford	Report
23	Pure Michigan 400	Matt Kenseth	Matt Kenseth	Matt Kenseth	Toyota	Report
24	Irwin Tools Night Race	Denny Hamlin	Kyle Busch	Joey Logano	Ford	Report
25	Bojangles' Southern 500	Brad Keselowski	Brad Keselowski	Carl Edwards	Toyota	Report
26	Federated Auto Parts 400	Joey Logano	Matt Kenseth	Matt Kenseth	Toyota	Report
Chase for the Sprint Cup
Challenger Round
27	myAFibRisk.com 400	Kevin Harvick	Kyle Busch	Denny Hamlin	Toyota	Report
28	Sylvania 300	Carl Edwards	Kevin Harvick	Matt Kenseth	Toyota	Report
29	AAA 400	Matt Kenseth	Kevin Harvick	Kevin Harvick	Chevrolet	Report
Contender Round
30	Bank of America 500	Matt Kenseth	Joey Logano	Joey Logano	Ford	Report
31	Hollywood Casino 400	Brad Keselowski	Matt Kenseth	Joey Logano	Ford	Report
32	CampingWorld.com 500	Jeff Gordon	Dale Earnhardt Jr.	Joey Logano	Ford	Report
Eliminator Round
33	Goody's Headache Relief Shot 500	Joey Logano	Joey Logano	Jeff Gordon	Chevrolet	Report
34	AAA Texas 500	Brad Keselowski	Brad Keselowski	Jimmie Johnson	Chevrolet	Report
35	Quicken Loans Race for Heroes 500	Jimmie Johnson	Kevin Harvick	Dale Earnhardt Jr.	Chevrolet	Report
Championship
36	Ford EcoBoost 400	Denny Hamlin	Brad Keselowski	Kyle Busch	Toyota	Report

=== Drivers' Championship ===
(key) Bold – Pole position awarded by time. Italics – Pole position set by final practice results or owner's points. * – Most laps led.
. – Eliminated after Round of 16 . – Eliminated after Round of 12 . – Eliminated after Round of 8

Pos.	Driver	DAY	ATL	LVS	PHO	CAL	MAR	TEX	BRI	RCH	TAL	KAN	CLT	DOV	POC	MCH	SON	DAY	KEN	NHA	IND	POC	GLN	MCH	BRI	DAR	RCH	CHI	NHA	DOV	CLT	KAN	TAL	MAR	TEX	PHO	HOM	Pts
1	Kyle Busch	INQ											11	36	9	43	1	17	1*	1	1	**21**	2	11	8*	7	2	9*	37	2	20	5	11	5	4	4	1	5043
2	Kevin Harvick	2	2*	1*	**1***	2	8*	2	38*	2	8	2	9	2	2	29*	4	4	8	3	3*	42	3*	2	2	5	14	42	21*	1*	2	16	15	8	3	2*	2	5042
3	Jeff Gordon	**33***	41	**18**	9	10	9	7	3	8	**31**	4	15	10	14	21	16	6	7	9	42	3	41	17	20	16	7	14	7	12	8	10	**3**	1	9	6	6	5038
4	Martin Truex Jr.	8	6	2	7	8	6	9	29	10	5	9*	5*	6*	1*	3	42	38	17	12	4	19	25	3	28	9	32	13	8	11	3	15	7	6	8	14	12	5032
Chase for the Sprint Cup cut-off
Pos.	Driver	DAY	ATL	LVS	PHO	CAL	MAR	TEX	BRI	RCH	TAL	KAN	CLT	DOV	POC	MCH	SON	DAY	KEN	NHA	IND	POC	GLN	MCH	BRI	DAR	RCH	CHI	NHA	DOV	CLT	KAN	TAL	MAR	TEX	PHO	HOM	Pts
5	Carl Edwards	23	12	42	13	13	17	10	24	19	32	20	1	19	15	12	40	41	4	**7**	**13**	10	8	6	7	1	11	2	**5**	15	6	8	5	14	5	12	11	2368
6	Joey Logano	1	**4**	10	8	7	**3**	4	40	**5**	33	**5**	13	11	4	5	5	22	2	4	2	20*	1	7	1	4	**3**	6	3	10	1*	1	1	**37***	40	3	4	2360
7	Brad Keselowski	41	9	7	6	1	2	5	35	17	22	7	7	12	17	6	19	29	6	2*	10	2	7	9	6	**2***	8	8	12	16	9	**9**	4	32	**2***	9	3*	2347
8	Kurt Busch	QL			5	**3***	14	**14**	15	1*	12	8	10	31	**5**	1	2	5	10	10	8	37	5	20	14	6	15	3	19	17	5	6	10	34	7	7	8	2333
9	Denny Hamlin	4	38	5	23	28	1	11	26^{1}	22	9	41	8	**21**	10	11	18	3	3	14	5	22	27	5	**3**	3	6	1	2	18	4	2	37	3	38	8	**10**	2327
10	Jimmie Johnson	5	1	41	11	9	35	1*	2	3	2	1	40	1	3	19	6*	2	9	22	15	6	10	39	4	19	9	11	6	41	39	3	18	12	1	**5**	9	2315
11	Ryan Newman	38	10	3	3	5	27	12	5	11	7	10	6	18	39	18	9	8	20	11	11	23	15	8	10	13	20	4	10	19	15	11	12	7	22	11	16	2314
12	Dale Earnhardt Jr.	3	3	4	43	6	36	3	16	14	1*	3	3	14	11	2	7	1*	21	5	22	4	11	10	9	8	5	12	25	3	28	21	2*	4	6	1	40	2310
13	Jamie McMurray	27	40	11	2	21	10	6	14	4	11	13	19	7	7	7	11	15	14	26	16	15	40	16	11	14	13	16	14	4	12	24	39	2	10	15	13	2295
14	Paul Menard	25	13	12	14	4	23	41	11	15	3	18	14	8	31	8	13	16	15	25	14	11	13	12	24	26	26	17	15	25	36	19	6	15	13	13	21	2262
15	Matt Kenseth	35	5	9	16	31	4	23	**1**	7	25	6	**4**	39	6	4	21	23	5	6	7	1	4	**1***	42	21	1*	5	1	7	**42**	14*	26	38			7	2234
16	Clint Bowyer	7	24	21	24	30	13	22	12	9	30	21	20	9	22	10	3	10	19	34	6	8	6	41	5	17	10	19	26	14	11	40	8	43	15	23	43	2175
17	Aric Almirola	15	11	26	19	11	12	19	13	20	15	11	17	5	43	22	14	34	12	15	38	18	16	14	17	11	4	10	43	5	10	24	16	16	18	10	41	940
18	Kasey Kahne	9	14	17	4	17	11	8	37	6	34	17	12	4	13	**15**	8	32	27	19	24	43	42	15	16	12	18	24	9	6	43	4	19	9	20	26	19	939
19	Kyle Larson	34	26	8	10	26	QL	25	7	12	42	15	25	3	8	17	15	39	35	31	9	12	12	13	41	10	12	7	17	9	21	29	24	19	37	21	5	872
20	Greg Biffle	10	25	14	27	32	19	17	30	21	37	12	2	17	12	36	27	20	16	27	19	5	14	23	25	18	31	21	4	13	24	17	20	26	19	25	15	869
21	Austin Dillon	14	39	20	15	16	41	20	10	27	35	22	16	33	19	20	17	7	25	8	25	13	36	4	13	22	27	43	22	23	7	41	14	18	11	20	14	832
22	A. J. Allmendinger	20	7	6	17	34	43	21	34	13	17	14	29	24	38	23	**37**	21	26	13	23	7	**24**	28	26	23	24	36	23	30	16	27	36	11	17	24	20	758
23	Casey Mears	6	15	25	20	23	15	27	36	30	28	19	23	27	16	13	38	11	23	16	20	28	18	42	23	29	21	20	18	24	18	23	31	17	26	22	42	754
24	Danica Patrick	21	16	27	26	19	7	16	9	25	21	27	22	15	37	16	24	35	34	24	27	16	17	25	27	42	19	26	40	21	19	22	27	40	16	16	24	716
25	Ricky Stenhouse Jr.	29	36	29	12	15	40	15	4	28	26	24	37	37	42	25	20	19	11	17	35	41	34	26	21	38	16	18	13	8	13	13	9	39	21	41	22	712
26	Sam Hornish Jr.	12	21	24	40	43	32	26	19	35	6	16	24	22	41	26	10	30	22	29	17	39	9	18	18	28	28	30	20	20	17	28	17	28	24	31	25	709
27	David Ragan	17	18	22	21	18	5	13	41	23	38	33	41	13	23	35	39	12	18	18	21	17	23	18	40	40	17	15	41	22	37	25	30	25	23	18	27	701
28	Tony Stewart	42	30	33	39	14	20	24	6	41	19	39	21	16	21	28	12	14	33	20	28	9	43	21	19	15	29	25	11	26	26	35	25	10	42	27	29	695
29	Trevor Bayne	30	19	28	28	29	18	18	28	24	41	31	27	43	24	9	23	9	13	32	40	40	22	22	15	35	23	28	16	31	22	18	21	31	39	34	18	655
30	Justin Allgaier	37	20	31	18	12	42	39	8	18	23	30	43	42	20	27	35	18	24	40	37	24	19	29	12	33	25	23	39	27	40	26	42	13	28	17	36	588
31	Cole Whitt	22	37	32	25	24	22	35	27	36	13	35	28	26	28	32	22	25	37	28	33	27	21	27	29	43	38	29	24	28	38	33	22	20	27	33	28	553
32	David Gilliland	11	22	23	29	35	25	28	18	31	20	32	33	25	27	42	43	40	29	21	29	33	33	32	36	27	33	32	28	30	27	36	32	24	29	30	32	533
33	Alex Bowman	DNQ	23	43	30	33	37	33	20	32	16	43	26	20	26	41	31	24	31	42	43	25	29	31	32	24	37	37	42	32	32	31	33	22	41	38	26	437
34	Brett Moffitt **(R)**		8	37	32	22	28	29	17	29		34	31	28	30	33		27	32	33	34	31		34	30	36	35	31	27	42	30	32		35	30	36	31	422
35	Matt DiBenedetto **(R)**		DNQ	DNQ	35	42	31	34	21	37	18	25	34	32	32	39	29	26	42	35	32	29	26	30	33	25	36	39	30	34	29	30	40	30	35	28	37	399
36	Michael Annett	13	29	39	42	38	39	40	23	33	29	23	32	41	34	30	33	37	30	36	30	26	31	35	43	39	43	34	29	37	25	34	DNQ	23	31	32	30	398
37	Josh Wise	DNQ	32	34	36	36	30	38	39	42	10	28	35	40	29	34	28	31	43		DNQ			37	35	DNQ	DNQ	33	31	36	DNQ		29				39	254
38	Jeb Burton **(R)**	DNQ	35	40	34	39	29	DNQ	42	38	DNQ	42	DNQ	30	33	37	32	36	41	41	DNQ	35	39	33	DNQ	31	39	38	33	43	41	37	DNQ	27	32	39	DNQ	216
39	Michael McDowell	31	27	30				31	22		DNQ	36	30				34	DNQ	DNQ		31		20		31		42	DNQ			31		28		34		33	213
40	Alex Kennedy **(R)**				38		33	37	33	39			36				25		40			38	28							38	34			33				120
41	Reed Sorenson	32	DNQ	DNQ	Wth	DNQ				34									36	DNQ	DNQ	34		DNQ	DNQ		41	40		33	35	38			DNQ		DNQ	74
42	Bobby Labonte	24									27							43															23					60
43	Michael Waltrip	26									36																						13					58
44	Ryan Preece																												32					42	36	37	38	35
45	Brian Vickers			15	41																																	32
46	Will Kimmel																		38													39						11
47	Mike Wallace	36	DNQ	DNQ		Wth																																8
48	T. J. Bell																						DNQ			37												7
49	Eddie MacDonald																			37																		7
50	Kyle Fowler																																	41				3
51	Ron Hornaday Jr.	DNQ	42		Wth		DNQ		DNQ																													2
	Tanner Berryhill **(R)**				DNQ																																	0
Ineligible for Sprint Cup driver points
Pos.	Driver	DAY	ATL	LVS	PHO	CAL	MAR	TEX	BRI	RCH	TAL	KAN	CLT	DOV	POC	MCH	SON	DAY	KEN	NHA	IND	POC	GLN	MCH	BRI	DAR	RCH	CHI	NHA	DOV	CLT	KAN	TAL	MAR	TEX	PHO	HOM	Pts
	Ryan Blaney	39		19				42			4		42			24		DNQ	DNQ	23	12			24	22	30		DNQ			14	7	43		43		17	
	Brian Scott	DNQ	QL	13		27					43			38				42			36						22	22				12			14			
	Erik Jones											40																							12	19		
	Landon Cassill	43	43	35	22	25	21	32	43	26	39	29	39	23	25	31	36	13	28	30	26	14	35	36	38	20	30	27	38	40	23	43	34	21	25	35	35	
	Ty Dillon	28										26			18	14																					23	
	J. J. Yeley	40	34	36	31	37	26	43	32	QL	14	37	38	29	36	38	41	33	39	43	39	30	30	38	34	34	34	35		35	33	42	38	29	33	29	34	
	Regan Smith	16	17	16			16																															
	Chase Elliott						38			16			18								18					41												
	Matt Crafton	18																																				
	Johnny Sauter	19																																				
	Chris Buescher					20	24	30	25		24												37															
	Boris Said																26						32															
	Brendan Gaughan		28	38	37	41	DNQ	DNQ	DNQ	DNQ	40	DNQ	DNQ	34	40	DNQ	DNQ	28																				
	Justin Marks	DNQ															30																					
	Mike Bliss		31	DNQ	33	40	34	36	31				DNQ	35		40									37	32												
	Travis Kvapil			DNQ	DNQ	DNQ							DNQ	DNQ	35				DNQ			32		40	DNQ	DNQ		DNQ	DNQ				35					
	Joe Nemechek		33																																			
	B. J. McLeod																												34									
	Joey Gase									43		38																							DNQ	42		
	Jeffrey Earnhardt																										40		35									
	Timmy Hill																			38	41	36	38	43	39	DNQ	DNQ	41	36	39	DNQ	DNQ	41	36		43		
	Derek White																			39																		
	Jeff Green									40			DNQ	DNQ																								
	Ryan Ellis																																			40		
Pos.	Driver	DAY	ATL	LVS	PHO	CAL	MAR	TEX	BRI	RCH	TAL	KAN	CLT	DOV	POC	MCH	SON	DAY	KEN	NHA	IND	POC	GLN	MCH	BRI	DAR	RCH	CHI	NHA	DOV	CLT	KAN	TAL	MAR	TEX	PHO	HOM	Pts
^{1} Due to neck spasms Denny Hamlin was not able to contest all 500 laps, during the first early red flag he got out of his car and was replaced by Cup debutant Erik Jones. Since Hamlin started the race, he is officially credited with the 26th-place finish.

=== Manufacturers' Championship ===
Pos	Manufacturer	Wins	Points
1	Chevrolet	15	1584
2	Toyota	14	1516
3	Ford	7	1498

== Media coverage ==
In the United States, NBC Sports returned to covering NASCAR for the first time since the end of the 2006 season. Fox Sports returned for their coverage of NASCAR for the 15th-year in a row and as the lone incumbent from 2014. As in their prior arrangement, Fox covered the first half of the season while NBC covered the second half, which includes the Chase for the Sprint Cup. While still dividing the coverage of the Daytona races between the two networks, the nature of the split was changed. Fox retained its exclusive rights to the Daytona 500 while NBC gained exclusive rights to the Coke Zero 400. Under the previous Fox/NBC contract, Fox televised the Daytona 500 in odd numbered years (2001, 2003, 2005) while NBC did so in even numbered years (2002, 2004, 2006). Under the old arrangement, the network that did not air the Daytona 500 would air the Coke Zero 400.

== See also ==
- 2015 NASCAR Xfinity Series
- 2015 NASCAR Camping World Truck Series
- 2015 NASCAR K&N Pro Series East
- 2015 NASCAR K&N Pro Series West
- 2015 NASCAR Whelen Modified Tour
- 2015 NASCAR Whelen Southern Modified Tour
- 2015 NASCAR Canadian Tire Series
- 2015 NASCAR Mexico Series
- 2015 NASCAR Whelen Euro Series
