= Bob Osborne =

NASCAR crew chief

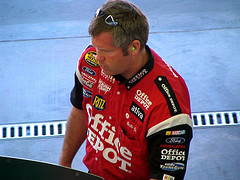

Personal information
- Born: June 5, 1974 (age 51) Chester, Pennsylvania, U.S.

Sport
- Country: United States
- Sport: NASCAR Sprint Cup Series
- Team: Front Row Motorsports

Bob Osborne (born June 5, 1974) is an American former NASCAR Sprint Cup Series crew chief. His last position at Roush Fenway Racing was as a senior member of the organization's management team and steering committee. He won 19 races during his nine-year tenure as a crew chief, 18 of them with Carl Edwards, and one with Chris Buescher. [1]

== Rise into racing ==
It was not until late in his junior year of college at Penn State University that Osborne got the itch to go racing. While working on a Formula SAE project, Osborne became friends with the gentleman who ran the shop where Osborne's project car was being built. Carson Baird is a retired IMSA driver and crew chief that spent time talking to Osborne about racing and told Osborne that if he had to do it over again, he would get involved with NASCAR as the racing was much more interesting. Osborne took that advice to heart and from there made the decision to get started in NASCAR.

For six months after he graduated, Osborne spent day and night knocking on doors trying to land a job with a NASCAR team. Finally in January 1998, Osborne was given the opportunity to work for the No. 96 Sprint Cup team as the tire specialist. Osborne worked for the team for one year, never relying on his engineering degree but knowing that his time and patience would eventually pay off.

At the end of the 1998 season the No. 96 team closed its doors and Osborne went on to work for owner Jack Roush, at then Roush Racing, where he has been working his way up the ladder ever since. Osborne started out as a general R&D data acquisition engineer where he worked at the shop traveling only to tests for the first two years of his Roush Racing career. After two years, Roush Racing decided to employ an engineer with each Cup team. Osborne was assigned to the No. 6 team driven by Mark Martin where he spent the following two years as the team engineer traveling to each race and becoming the right-hand man to the crew chief.

In his second year with Mark Martin and the No. 6 team, Osborne also took on R&D wind tunnel projects that took him across the Atlantic Ocean to Germany on several occasions. During the 2003 season Osborne also assumed the title of Director of Engineering for Roush Racing which saw him manage the other Roush engineers.

== Crew chief career ==
2004

All of Osborne's experience with the No. 6 team lead to him getting promoted to crew chief of the No. 99. Osborne's first race as crew chief came during the spring Darlington race in 2004 with veteran driver Jeff Burton. In the following 31 races, Osborne accrued two top-five and eight top-10 finishes. In August 2004, Osborne received word that rookie Carl Edwards would be taking over the driving duties of the No. 99 Ford. Although both were rookies, the team never missed a beat and Osborne coached Edwards to a 10th-place finish in his first career Cup start at Michigan. The team closed out 2004 posting one top-five and five top-10 finishes in just 13 starts.

2005

Osborne and Edwards picked up in 2005 where they left off in 2004, breaking into the win column in just the fourth race of the year in Atlanta. The team would go on to post three more wins, taking checkered flags at Pocono, repeating at Atlanta and winning the inaugural night race at Texas Motor Speedway, while earning two poles and running to 13 top-five and 18 top 10 finishes. The duo also gave the competition a run for their money in the Chase finishing third in the 2005 NASCAR Nextel Cup Series points standings.

2006

Osborne’s team entered the 2006 season as championship favorites but got off to a slow start. Ultimately the team chalked up three top-five and four top-10 finishes in nine starts together. In April, owner Jack Roush made the decision to move Osborne to the No. 26 Ford driven by Jamie McMurray. The move was in an effort to strengthen the overall racing operations. By the second Phoenix race in November, Osborne was back with Edwards and the No. 99 team and looking ahead to 2007.

2007

In 2007 Osborne’s No. 99 team remained inside the top 12 in point standings for 31 of 36 weeks. Led by Osborne, Edwards also broke a 52-race winless streak at Michigan International Speedway. Osborne led Edward and the No. 99 team to two more victories in 2007 at Bristol and Dover in the newly introduced Car of Tomorrow.

2008

Osborne and Edwards kicked off the 2008 season by taking home the checkered flag in two of the first three races, and continued their winning ways throughout the season. The duo paired to record the most wins, top-five and top-10 finishes of all Cup drivers. Their quest for the championship came up just short, finishing just 69 points behind champion Jimmie Johnson.

2009

In 2009, Edwards entered the season as one of the teams to beat. In a disappointment, Edwards and Osborne did not win a race for the second time in a season together making the chase but finishing 11th in points.

2010

The 2010 season wasn't much different from 2009 although the team managed to win the final two races of the year at Phoenix and Homestead-Miami finishing the season with huge momentum and finishing 4th in the chase standings.

2011

The No. 99 team got another win at Las Vegas Motor Speedway as well as the NASCAR Sprint All-Star Race XXVII. Although having the most top 5s, top 10s, and best average finish than anyone else in 2011, the team fell short again in the championship to surging Tony Stewart, who won five of the ten chase races that year. Although in a virtual tie in the points, Stewart owned the tie-breaker with more wins giving him the title.

At the end of the 2011 season, Carl Edwards's contract with Roush-Fenway Racing would be up leaving both Edwards's and Osborne's futures in question. On August 4, Edwards announced he had signed a multi-year deal keeping him at Roush with Osborne as his crew chief.

2012

On July 17, 2012, Osborne announced he would step down as crew chief from the No. 99 team, citing "health reasons" as his concern. At the time, Edwards was running 11th in the Sprint Cup points. It was announced that Chad Norris would take over as crew chief for Edwards.

2015

On January 6, 2015, Roush Fenway Racing announced that Bob Osborne would be returning to the top of the pit box to be crew chief for 2011 Daytona 500 champion Trevor Bayne in his first full-time season with the organization in the No. 6 Ford Fusion.

2016

In 2016, Osborne joined Front Row Motorsports to be the crew chief of Roush development driver and 2015 Xfinity Champion Chris Buescher.
