= Donnie Wingo =

NASCAR crew chief

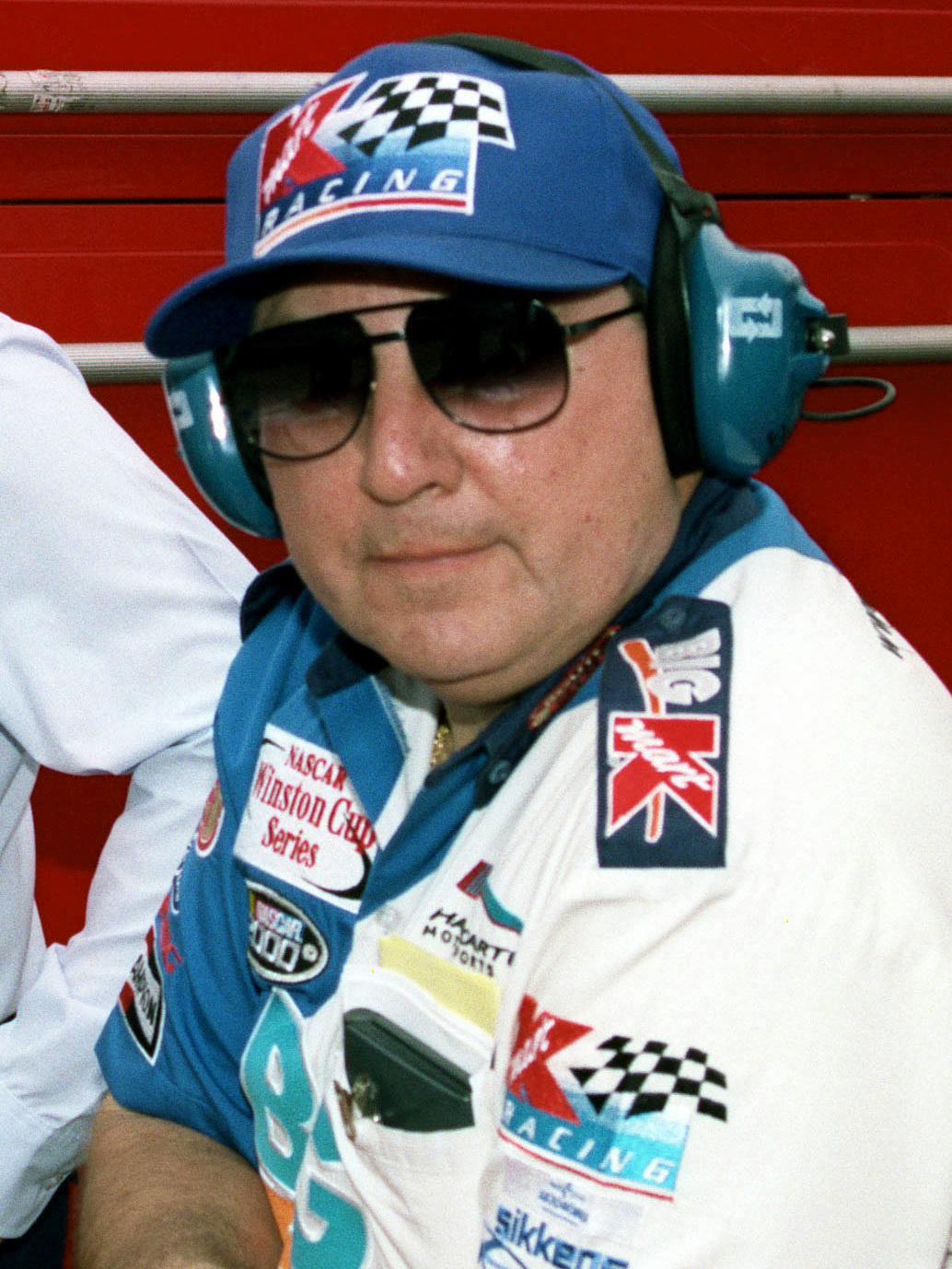
- Wingo in 2000

Personal information
- Nationality: American
- Born: February 13, 1960 (age 66) Mooresville, North Carolina, U.S.
- Occupation: Crew chief
- Years active: 1978-present

Sport
- Country: United States
- Sport: Motor racing
- League: NASCAR
- Team: Front Row Motorsports

Donnie Wingo (born February 13, 1960) is a crew chief in NASCAR who last worked on the No. 34 team of Landon Cassill for Front Row Motorsports. Wingo has seven career Sprint Cup victories as a crew chief.

== Biography ==
Wingo began as a crew member and mechanic for Jimmy Means in 1978. Wingo first served as a crew chief with Bud Moore Engineering's #15 Ford in 1990. He first worked with driver Morgan Shepherd, earning a victory at the season-ending race at Atlanta Motor Speedway. Over the next five seasons, he worked with Geoff Bodine, Lake Speed, and Dick Trickle, amassing three more wins (all with Bodine). In 1996, he moved to Travis Carter Enterprises (later Haas-Carter Motorsports), working with driver Jimmy Spencer until the end of the 2001 season, then primarily with Todd Bodine in 2002. From 2003 to 2008, he served as crew chief on Chip Ganassi Racing's 42 car, working with Jamie McMurray for three seasons, Casey Mears for two seasons, and Juan Pablo Montoya for his rookie season including Montoya's first win at Sonoma Raceway. After eight races in 2008, Wingo was moved to the 41 team of Reed Sorenson.

In 2009, Wingo joined Roush Fenway Racing, reuniting with McMurray on the team's 26 car including a win at Talladega Superspeedway in November. He was moved to David Ragan's 6 team for 2010, replacing Jimmy Fennig. Wingo moved to the No. 21 Wood Brothers Racing car near the end of the year to serve as crew chief for Roush development driver Trevor Bayne. With Bayne moving to Roush's 6 car for 2015, Wingo was replaced by Team Penske crew chief Jeremy Bullins for driver Ryan Blaney.
