= 2015 Coke Zero 400 =

2015 Coke Zero 400 powered by Coca-Cola
Race details
- Race 17 of 36 in the 2015 NASCAR Sprint Cup Series
- 2015 Coke Zero 400 program cover, featuring Aric Almirola, the 2014 winner
- Date: July 5–6, 2015
- Location: Daytona International Speedway in Daytona Beach, Florida
- Course: Permanent racing facility
- Course length: 2.5 miles (4.023 km)
- Distance: 161 laps, 402.5 mi (647.761 km)
- Scheduled distance: 160 laps, 400 mi (643.738 km)
- Weather: Rain with a temperature of 81 °F (27 °C); wind out of the southwest at 5 mph (8.0 km/h)
- Average speed: 134.941 mph (217.166 km/h)

Pole position
Driver	Dale Earnhardt Jr.	Hendrick Motorsports
- Time: 44.492 (Note: Qualifying was rained out, and the starting lineup was determined by the opening practice session.)

Most laps led
Driver	Dale Earnhardt Jr.	Hendrick Motorsports
- Laps: 96

Winner
No. 88	Dale Earnhardt Jr.	Hendrick Motorsports

Television in the United States
- Network: NBC
- Announcers: Rick Allen, Jeff Burton and Steve Letarte
- Nielsen ratings: 2.6/7 (Overnight); 2.7/7 (Final); 4.0 Million viewers

Radio in the United States
- Radio: MRN
- Booth announcers: Joe Moore, Jeff Striegle and Rusty Wallace
- Turn announcers: Dave Moody (1 & 2), Mike Bagley (Backstretch) and Kurt Becker (3 & 4)

The 2015 Coke Zero 400 powered by Coca-Cola was a NASCAR Sprint Cup Series race that was held between July 5 and 6, 2015 at Daytona International Speedway in Daytona Beach, Florida. Contested over 161 laps – extended from the scheduled 160 laps – on the 2.5-mile (4.0-kilometre) superspeedway, it was the 17th race of the 2015 NASCAR Sprint Cup Series season. Dale Earnhardt Jr. won the race, his second win of the season. His teammate Jimmie Johnson finished second while Denny Hamlin, Kevin Harvick, and Kurt Busch rounded out the top five.

With qualifying rained out, the field was set by first practice speeds and Earnhardt Jr. was given the first starting spot as a result. Further rain delays pushed the race's green flag back to 11:42 p.m., with the race concluding at 2:40 a.m. ET the following morning. Earnhardt Jr. led a race high of 96 laps on his way to winning the race. The race had 22 lead changes among twelve different drivers, as well as nine caution flag periods for 43 laps. The race was marred by a violent crash at the finish, most notably featuring Austin Dillon's car flipping into the outside catch fence.

It was Earnhardt Jr.'s 25th career victory, tenth career restrictor plate race win (in points competition), fourth at Daytona, and 14th at the track for Hendrick Motorsports. The win moved him up to second in the points standings. Chevrolet left Daytona with an 83-point lead over Ford in the manufacturer standings.

The event was also the first NASCAR Sprint Cup Series event to air on NBC since 2006 as part of a ten-year deal signed in 2013 in which NBCUniversal and its networks would broadcast the final half of the NASCAR Sprint Cup and Xfinity Series season.

== Report ==
=== Background ===
Daytona International Speedway, the track where the race was held.

Kevin Harvick entered Daytona with a 53-point lead over Martin Truex Jr., Joey Logano entered 57 back, Jimmie Johnson entered 70 back, and Dale Earnhardt Jr. entered 71 back.

==== Changes ====
During the Xfinity Series' Alert Today Florida 300 earlier in the year, a crash occurred in which Kyle Busch slammed into a concrete wall just past the exit to pit road, breaking his leg and sidelining him for the first eleven races of the Sprint Cup season. In response to the accident, the entire outer wall of the race track was fitted with SAFER barriers. The grass near the entrance of turn 1 and towards the exit of the tri-oval, where Busch's accident occurred, were paved over.

At the request of the race's broadcaster, NBC, the 2015 Coke Zero 400 was moved from its traditional Saturday night scheduling to Sunday night. Track president Joie Chitwood III explained that NBC wanted to treat the race as a special event to launch its revived coverage, similarly to NBC's Sunday Night Football. The move also removed a potential conflict with NBC's annual Macy's 4th of July Fireworks Spectacular special.

==== Entry list ====
The entry list for the Coke Zero 400 was released on Monday, June 29 at 11:41 a.m. EDT. Forty-five cars were entered for the race. All but the No. 21 Wood Brothers Racing Ford driven by Ryan Blaney were entered for the previous race at Sonoma Raceway. Driver changes for this race include Bobby Labonte in the No. 32 Go FAS Racing Ford normally driven by Mike Bliss, Brian Scott in the No. 33 Hillman-Circle Sport LLC Chevrolet normally driven by Alex Kennedy, and Brett Moffitt returning to the No. 34 Front Row Motorsports Ford.

No.	Driver	Team	Manufacturer
1	Jamie McMurray	Chip Ganassi Racing	Chevrolet
2	Brad Keselowski (PC3)	Team Penske	Ford
3	Austin Dillon	Richard Childress Racing	Chevrolet
4	Kevin Harvick (PC1)	Stewart–Haas Racing	Chevrolet
5	Kasey Kahne	Hendrick Motorsports	Chevrolet
6	Trevor Bayne	Roush Fenway Racing	Ford
7	Alex Bowman	Tommy Baldwin Racing	Chevrolet
9	Sam Hornish Jr.	Richard Petty Motorsports	Ford
10	Danica Patrick	Stewart–Haas Racing	Chevrolet
11	Denny Hamlin	Joe Gibbs Racing	Toyota
13	Casey Mears	Germain Racing	Chevrolet
14	Tony Stewart (PC4)	Stewart–Haas Racing	Chevrolet
15	Clint Bowyer	Michael Waltrip Racing	Toyota
16	Greg Biffle	Roush Fenway Racing	Ford
17	Ricky Stenhouse Jr.	Roush Fenway Racing	Ford
18	Kyle Busch	Joe Gibbs Racing	Toyota
19	Carl Edwards	Joe Gibbs Racing	Toyota
20	Matt Kenseth (PC6)	Joe Gibbs Racing	Toyota
21	Ryan Blaney (i)	Wood Brothers Racing	Ford
22	Joey Logano	Team Penske	Ford
23	J. J. Yeley (i)	BK Racing	Toyota
24	Jeff Gordon (PC7)	Hendrick Motorsports	Chevrolet
26	Jeb Burton (R)	BK Racing	Toyota
27	Paul Menard	Richard Childress Racing	Chevrolet
31	Ryan Newman	Richard Childress Racing	Chevrolet
32	Bobby Labonte (PC8)	Go FAS Racing	Ford
33	Brian Scott (i)	Hillman-Circle Sport LLC	Chevrolet
34	Brett Moffitt (R)	Front Row Motorsports	Ford
35	Cole Whitt	Front Row Motorsports	Ford
38	David Gilliland	Front Row Motorsports	Ford
40	Landon Cassill (i)	Hillman-Circle Sport LLC	Chevrolet
41	Kurt Busch (PC5)	Stewart–Haas Racing	Chevrolet
42	Kyle Larson	Chip Ganassi Racing	Chevrolet
43	Aric Almirola	Richard Petty Motorsports	Ford
46	Michael Annett	HScott Motorsports	Chevrolet
47	A. J. Allmendinger	JTG Daugherty Racing	Chevrolet
48	Jimmie Johnson (PC2)	Hendrick Motorsports	Chevrolet
51	Justin Allgaier	HScott Motorsports	Chevrolet
55	David Ragan	Michael Waltrip Racing	Toyota
62	Brendan Gaughan (i)	Premium Motorsports	Chevrolet
78	Martin Truex Jr.	Furniture Row Racing	Chevrolet
83	Matt DiBenedetto (R)	BK Racing	Toyota
88	Dale Earnhardt Jr.	Hendrick Motorsports	Chevrolet
95	Michael McDowell	Leavine Family Racing	Ford
98	Josh Wise	Phil Parsons Racing	Ford
Official initial entry list
Official final entry list

Key	Meaning
(R)	Rookie
(i)	Ineligible for points
(PC#)	Past champions provisional

== Practice ==
=== First practice ===
Dale Earnhardt Jr. was the fastest in the first practice session with a time of 44.492 and a speed of 202.284 mph (325.545 km/h). Ten minutes into the session, Brad Keselowski made contact with Kyle Busch and sent him spinning in the middle of the pack. Michael Annett, Trevor Bayne, Greg Biffle, Carl Edwards, Denny Hamlin, Sam Hornish Jr., Jamie McMurray, Ryan Newman and Martin Truex Jr. were all collected in the wreck. “The 2 car got on my back rear and just spun us around,” Busch said. “There’s room to lift and sometimes you don’t.” “A couple of guys got in front of me right there,” Truex said. “They started checking up in front of me and the 18 went sideways, a lot of damage. We’re going to a backup car.”

Pos	No.	Driver	Team	Manufacturer	Time	Speed
1	88	Dale Earnhardt Jr.	Hendrick Motorsports	Chevrolet	44.492	202.284
2	3	Austin Dillon	Richard Childress Racing	Chevrolet	44.540	202.066
3	15	Clint Bowyer	Michael Waltrip Racing	Toyota	44.556	201.993
Official first practice results

=== Final practice ===
Danica Patrick was the fastest in the final practice session with a time of 45.424 and a speed of 198.133 mph (318.864 km/h).

Pos	No.	Driver	Team	Manufacturer	Time	Speed
1	10	Danica Patrick	Stewart–Haas Racing	Chevrolet	45.424	198.133
2	41	Kurt Busch	Stewart–Haas Racing	Chevrolet	45.466	197.950
3	4	Kevin Harvick	Stewart–Haas Racing	Chevrolet	45.467	197.946
Official final practice results

== Qualifying ==
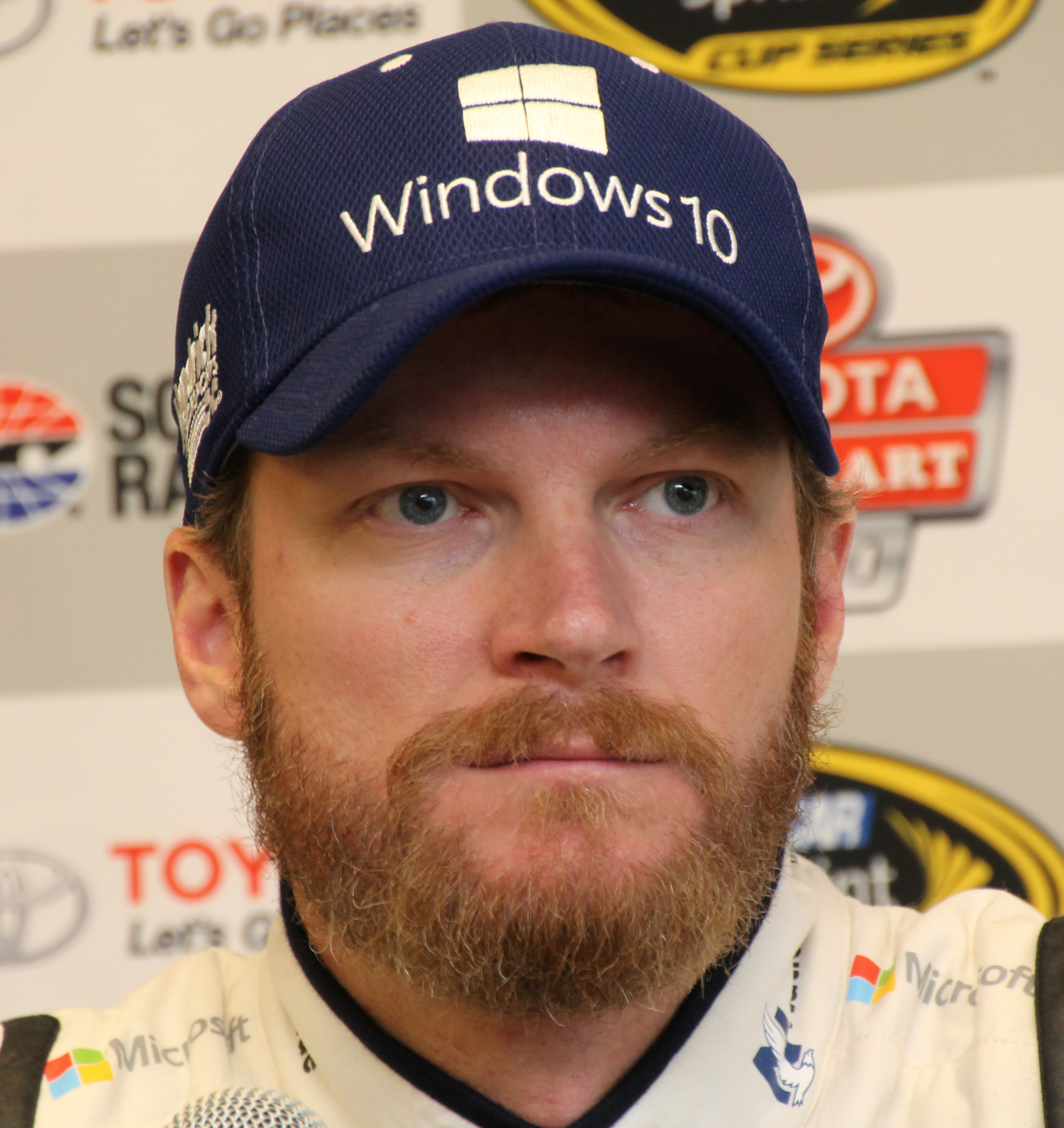
Dale Earnhardt Jr., seen here the week before at Sonoma Raceway, was awarded the first starting spot as a result of qualifying being canceled.

Two rounds of single-car qualifying were scheduled to take place on Saturday at 4:35 p.m. Eastern Daylight Time, but were cancelled due to rain. The lineup was set by first practice results. So Dale Earnhardt Jr. was declared as the polesitter per the NASCAR rulebook. “I asked Greg (Ives, crew chief) before we went out to practice what we were trying to accomplish in that first practice and that was the first thing he mentioned was to go out that first run and try to put a lap down because the weather wasn’t looking real good for today," Earnhardt said. "That was his decision. It ended up working out for us.” "This track has been very special to me, we know how important is to the sport," said Jeff Gordon, who'll start 23rd in his 46th and final career race at Daytona. "I'm kind of bummed out that it was rained out." Despite posting the 22nd fastest lap in first practice, Ryan Blaney failed to make the race. When qualifying is rained out, NASCAR's rules state that the number of attempts a race team has made determines the starting lineup before practice times. As a result, the No. 21 Wood Brothers Racing Ford failed to qualify for the first time in seven years. “I really hate this for Motorcraft/Quick Lane and all of our guests,” team co-owner Eddie Wood said in a release. “We’ve been lucky. This is the first time this has happened since we started part-time in 2009. We’ve dodged a lot of bullets, including last time in Michigan. This one got us, but if it has to happen, I’d rather it be for something we can’t control instead of for a lack of performance on our part.”

=== Starting lineup ===
Pos	No.	Driver	Team	Manufacturer	Time	Speed
1	88	Dale Earnhardt Jr.	Hendrick Motorsports	Chevrolet	44.492	202.284
2	3	Austin Dillon	Richard Childress Racing	Chevrolet	44.540	202.066
3	15	Clint Bowyer	Michael Waltrip Racing	Toyota	44.556	201.993
4	27	Paul Menard	Richard Childress Racing	Chevrolet	44.561	201.970
5	6	Trevor Bayne	Roush Fenway Racing	Ford	44.582	201.875
6	38	David Gilliland	Front Row Motorsports	Ford	44.597	201.807
7	47	A. J. Allmendinger	JTG Daugherty Racing	Chevrolet	44.612	201.739
8	55	David Ragan	Michael Waltrip Racing	Toyota	44.676	201.450
9	1	Jamie McMurray	Chip Ganassi Racing	Chevrolet	44.818	200.812
10	5	Kasey Kahne	Hendrick Motorsports	Chevrolet	44.822	200.794
11	9	Sam Hornish Jr.	Richard Petty Motorsports	Ford	44.857	200.638
12	48	Jimmie Johnson	Hendrick Motorsports	Chevrolet	44.866	200.597
13	18	Kyle Busch	Joe Gibbs Racing	Toyota	44.873	200.566
14	34	Brett Moffitt (R)	Front Row Motorsports	Ford	44.969	200.138
15	13	Casey Mears	Germain Racing	Chevrolet	45.021	199.907
16	42	Kyle Larson	Chip Ganassi Racing	Chevrolet	45.027	199.880
17	31	Ryan Newman	Richard Childress Racing	Chevrolet	45.043	199.809
18	46	Michael Annett	HScott Motorsports	Chevrolet	45.057	199.747
19	20	Matt Kenseth	Joe Gibbs Racing	Toyota	45.063	199.720
20	78	Martin Truex Jr.	Furniture Row Racing	Chevrolet	45.063	199.720
21	51	Justin Allgaier	HScott Motorsports	Chevrolet	45.088	199.610
22	40	Landon Cassill (i)	Hillman-Circle Sport LLC	Chevrolet	45.135	199.402
23	24	Jeff Gordon	Hendrick Motorsports	Chevrolet	45.199	199.119
24	19	Carl Edwards	Joe Gibbs Racing	Toyota	45.238	198.948
25	16	Greg Biffle (Note: Greg Biffle changed engines after crashing in the first practice session. As a result, he started the race from the rear of the field.)	Roush Fenway Racing	Ford	45.242	198.930
26	33	Brian Scott (i)	Hillman-Circle Sport LLC	Chevrolet	45.255	198.873
27	10	Danica Patrick	Stewart–Haas Racing	Chevrolet	45.264	198.834
28	41	Kurt Busch	Stewart–Haas Racing	Chevrolet	45.271	198.803
29	35	Cole Whitt	Front Row Motorsports	Ford	45.292	198.711
30	17	Ricky Stenhouse Jr.	Roush Fenway Racing	Ford	45.349	198.461
31	14	Tony Stewart	Stewart–Haas Racing	Chevrolet	45.353	198.443
32	2	Brad Keselowski	Team Penske	Ford	45.360	198.413
33	22	Joey Logano	Team Penske	Ford	45.389	198.286
34	4	Kevin Harvick	Stewart–Haas Racing	Chevrolet	45.467	198.111
35	11	Denny Hamlin	Joe Gibbs Racing	Toyota	45.477	197.902
36	43	Aric Almirola	Richard Petty Motorsports	Ford	45.024	195.550
37	7	Alex Bowman	Tommy Baldwin Racing	Chevrolet	47.428	189.761
38	32	Bobby Labonte	Go FAS Racing	Ford	47.572	189.187
39	23	J. J. Yeley (i)	BK Racing	Toyota	47.707	188.652
40	26	Jeb Burton (R)	BK Racing	Toyota	47.939	187.739
41	83	Matt DiBenedetto (R)	BK Racing	Toyota	48.039	187.348
42	98	Josh Wise	Phil Parsons Racing	Ford	0.000	0.000
43	62	Brendan Gaughan (i)	Premium Motorsports	Chevrolet	0.000	0.000
Failed to qualify
44	21	Ryan Blaney (i)	Wood Brothers Racing	Ford	45.117	199.481
45	95	Michael McDowell	Leavine Family Racing	Ford	46.937	191.746
First practice results
Official starting lineup

== Race ==
The race was scheduled to begin at 8:04 p.m. EDT on Sunday, but was delayed by rain that had been falling all afternoon. The green flag eventually fell at 11:42 p.m, marking the longest start delay of the race since the 2005 race. Race finished at 2:40 am EDT on Monday

=== First half ===
==== Start ====
Dale Earnhardt Jr. led the field to the green flag at 11:42 p.m. Austin Dillon drove to Earnhardt's outside on the backstretch to lead the first eight laps. The first caution of the race flew on lap 3 for a multi-car wreck exiting turn 4. It started when David Gilliland tried to drop in behind Earnhardt on the inside line, failing to see Clint Bowyer, and got turned around by Bowyer, and ten cars piled in. Michael Annett, Greg Biffle, Sam Hornish Jr., Bobby Labonte, reigning Daytona 500 winner Joey Logano, and Danica Patrick were also collected in the melee. A. J. Allmendinger, Annett, Biffle, Jeb Burton, Brendan Gaughan, Gilliland, Hornish Jr., Logano, and Patrick were tagged for pitting before pit road was open and restarted the race from the tail-end of the field, although this was moot as they were going to restart at the rear of the field anyway as they had all taken on crash damage. Annett and Logano were held a lap on pit road for running the stop/go sign at pit exit.

The race restarted on lap 9. Earnhardt passed Dillon going into three to take the lead on lap 10. While trying to pass Jamie McMurray, Kyle Busch got loose and pounded the wall in turn 2 on lap 17. To make matters worse for Busch, the race remained green. The second caution of the race, a scheduled competition caution to allow teams to check tire wear, flew on lap 26. Jimmie Johnson exited pit road with the race lead. Biffle and Kyle Busch were tagged for having too many crew members over the wall to service the car and restarted the race from the tail-end of the field. Gaughan was busted for both speeding on pit road and running the stop/go sign on pit exit. He was held a lap on pit road and restarted the race from the tail-end of the field.

The race restarted on lap 31. Earnhardt took back the lead on lap 32. Johnson got a run on him going into turn 2 to retake the lead on lap 34. The third caution of the race flew on lap 53, when exiting turn 4, Carl Edwards snapped loose and turned down the apron. The culprit was a flat tire. “This is really frustrating,” said Edwards. “I never have flat tires. Goodyear does a pretty job. We got it back together, and then this happened.” Johnson swapped the lead with Earnhardt on pit road with the latter exiting with the lead. Biffle, Edwards, and Gaughan were tagged for pitting before pit road was open and restarted the race from the tail-end of the field. Casey Mears was tagged for driving through more than three pit boxes getting to his stall and restarted the race from the tail-end of the field.

==== Second quarter ====
The race restarted on lap 58. The fourth caution of the race flew on the same lap when, out of turn 4, Gilliland spun and then stalled on the track. Biffle, Burton, Kyle Busch, and Logano were tagged for pitting before pit road was open and restarted the race from the tail-end of the field. Annett was tagged for having too many crew members over the wall to service the car and restarted the race from the tail-end of the field.

The race restarted on lap 64. After riding single file for the first few laps, Kevin Harvick got a second line moving to the front of the pack. Johnson drove to Earnhardt's outside to take back the lead. Matt Kenseth used the outside line to briefly take the lead on lap 80. Johnson used the inside line to take back the lead on lap 81. The fifth caution of the race flew on lap 86 for a multi-car wreck in turn 2, when Kyle Larson spun, and Edwards spun trying to avoid him, then was hit from behind by Brian Scott, submarining under Edwards' car. Ricky Stenhouse Jr. also spun, but was able to save his car. Denny Hamlin exited pit road with the lead. Allmendinger, Edwards, and Larson were tagged for pitting before pit road was open and restarted the race from the tail-end of the field. Larson was also held a lap on pit road for running the stop/go sign at pit exit. Kyle Busch and Dillon were tagged for too many crew members over the wall to service the car and restarted the race from the tail-end of the field.

=== Second half ===
==== Halfway ====
The race restarted on lap 93. Kasey Kahne used a push from Harvick to take the lead. Hamlin used the outside line to take back the lead on lap 95. Earnhardt Jr. drove under Hamlin to retake the lead on lap 104. The sixth caution of the race flew on lap 105 for a multi-car wreck on the front stretch. This one started when, out of turn 4, Kenseth got turned by Kasey Kahne. Kenseth's car then washed up the track, collecting nine additional cars: those of Aric Almirola, Larson, Martin Truex Jr., Jamie McMurray, Brad Keselowski, Logano, Sam Hornish Jr., David Ragan and Trevor Bayne. "I was following Jeff Gordon up through there and he got shuffled out and I kind of committed to him and we started moving back up there pretty good," Almirola said. "I was happy about the momentum we had and next thing I know some cars got together on the inside, and I heard the noise and heard them start to spin. ... It is a game of inches here sometimes, and I think a couple feet more forward and we wouldn't be in this. It stinks. I am certainly disappointed."

The race restarted with 46 laps to go. Johnson retook the lead. Earnhardt Jr. dove underneath his teammate to retake the lead with 43 laps to go. The seventh caution of the race flew with 33 laps to go when Patrick cut a right front tire in turn 2 and hit the outside wall. Michael Annett was tagged for speeding on pit road and restarted the race from the tail-end of the field.

The race restarted with 28 laps to go. The eighth caution of the race flew with twelve laps to go when Ragan got loose and turned down into the backstretch grass. Ragan did not suffer major damage, and stayed on the lead lap. He would manage to get back up to twelfth place at the checkered flag.

==== Final laps ====
The race restarted on lap 151. The ninth and final caution of the race flew three laps later when Hornish Jr. spun out on the backstretch in the same place that Ragan had spun in, and slid through the grass, getting airborne and almost flipping.

===== Green-white-checker =====
====== Attempt #1 and the "Big One" ======
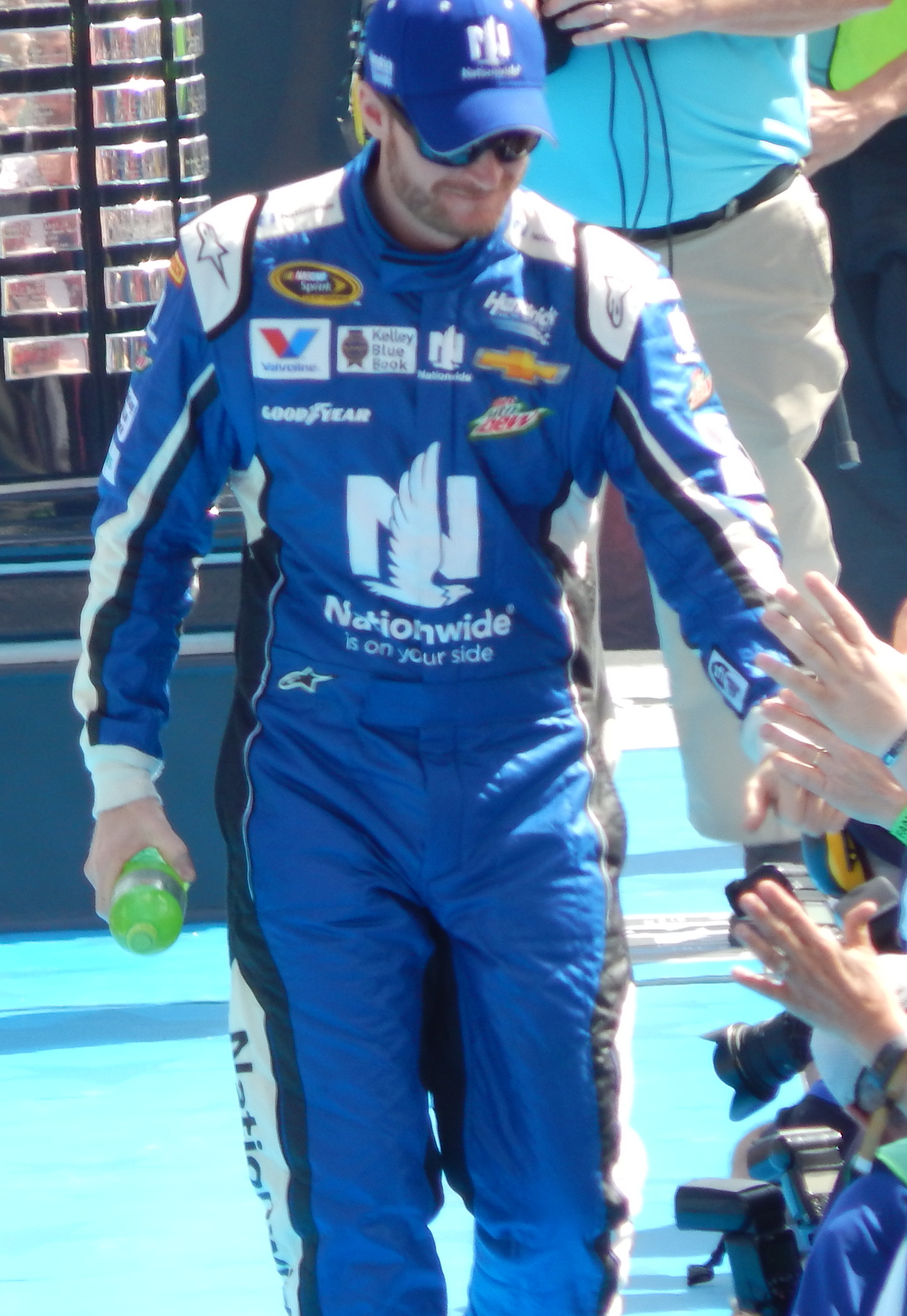
Dale Earnhardt Jr., seen here at the 2015 Daytona 500, scored the 25th victory of his career at Daytona International Speedway.

The race restarted with two laps to go. Earnhardt Jr. held off the field to take the victory. "I had a lot of fun tonight," said Earnhardt, who led a race-high 96 laps. "Our car was fast. I had to block a lot and you’ve got to run real, real hard to win here." As the field raced to the checkered flag, Harvick tapped Hamlin from behind, instigating a massive wreck involving at least 24 cars. In the resulting chaos, Hamlin struck Dillon's car at such an angle that it flipped and flew over two lanes in the air into the catch fence, ripping out the engine. The car hit one of the fence poles at about 190 miles per hour and came to an almost complete stop. The crash left a 60 foot gaping hole and a bent post in the catchfence. Dillon's car landed back on the track upside down, coming to a rest at the exit to the pit road, and was then hit again by Keselowski, who spun in oil while trying to avoid the crash. The impact was similar to Bobby Allison's 1987 Winston 500, Geoff Bodine's 2000 Daytona 250, Carl Edwards 2009 Aaron's 499, and Kyle Larson's 2013 DRIVE4COPD 300 wrecks. Five fans were injured by debris, with one taken to Halifax Medical Center and later released, while the other four were treated and released from the infield care center. Upon coming to a stop, Dillon was helped out of his car by Earnhardt's and Mears's pit crews to loud cheers, and walked away. He was treated and released from the infield care center with a bruised tailbone and forearm.

== Post-race ==
=== Driver comments ===
"It was very vicious," Dillon said of the crash. "It's twisting you around in there, and the belts are loosening with each hit, so the hits are getting more and more violent. By the fourth hit, you've separated enough so that the fourth one is going to hurt more than others. I held on to the steering wheel as hard as I could. I'm sure I'm going to find more bumps and bruises during the week, but right now I feel all right. It was just crazy. It's part of this racing. Everybody is pushing as hard as they can — pushing in a tight pack. I was pushing the 24 (Jeff Gordon) and the people behind are pushing me, It was just a wad right there at the end. At these speedway races, you're just praying and hoping that you get through it. I thought the wreck was over and I was sliding on the roof. I thought, 'We made it. We made it.' And then there was a big bang. I think it was the 2 car (Keselowski) that ran into me. Literally I had just got done stopping and crew members were everywhere. I thought that was really cool and special. It was comforting to me. They got to me pretty quick. I just wanted to get out of there and let the fans know I was OK."

Dillon also spoke about the safety of the fans. "It's not really acceptable, I don't think," Dillon told reporters after exiting the care center. "We've got to figure out something. Our speeds are too high, I think. I think everybody could get good racing with slower speeds. We can work at that, and then figure out a way to keep the cars on the ground. That's the next thing. We're fighting hard to make the racing good. I hope the fans appreciate that. We don't, but it's our job. You go out there and hold it wide open to the end and hope you make it through."

Other drivers commented on Dillon's wreck after the race. "You are just on the verge of tears," Earnhardt said in victory lane. "I saw everything in the mirror pretty clearly ... I just was very scared for whoever that car was. I didn't care about anything except figuring out who was OK. The racing doesn't matter anymore." Audio of Earnhardt's radio chatter with his crew chief was later released revealing Earnhardt's horrified reaction to the crash in the moment, with him too concerned over Dillon's status to celebrate his win. "I'm shocked that Austin Dillon is even alive," said Jimmie Johnson after finishing runner-up. "I expected the worst when I came back around."

== Race results ==
Pos	No.	Driver	Team	Manufacturer	Laps	Points
1	88	Dale Earnhardt Jr.	Hendrick Motorsports	Chevrolet	161	48
2	48	Jimmie Johnson	Hendrick Motorsports	Chevrolet	161	43
3	11	Denny Hamlin	Joe Gibbs Racing	Toyota	161	42
4	4	Kevin Harvick	Stewart–Haas Racing	Chevrolet	161	40
5	41	Kurt Busch	Stewart–Haas Racing	Chevrolet	161	39
6	24	Jeff Gordon	Hendrick Motorsports	Chevrolet	161	38
7	3	Austin Dillon	Richard Childress Racing	Chevrolet	161	38
8	31	Ryan Newman	Richard Childress Racing	Chevrolet	161	37
9	6	Trevor Bayne	Roush Fenway Racing	Ford	161	35
10	15	Clint Bowyer	Michael Waltrip Racing	Toyota	161	35
11	13	Casey Mears	Germain Racing	Chevrolet	161	33
12	55	David Ragan	Michael Waltrip Racing	Toyota	161	32
13	40	Landon Cassill (i)	Hillman-Circle Sport LLC	Chevrolet	161	0
14	14	Tony Stewart	Stewart–Haas Racing	Chevrolet	161	30
15	1	Jamie McMurray	Chip Ganassi Racing	Chevrolet	161	29
16	27	Paul Menard	Richard Childress Racing	Chevrolet	161	28
17	18	Kyle Busch	Joe Gibbs Racing	Toyota	161	27
18	51	Justin Allgaier	HScott Motorsports	Chevrolet	161	26
19	17	Ricky Stenhouse Jr.	Roush Fenway Racing	Ford	161	25
20	16	Greg Biffle	Roush Fenway Racing	Ford	161	24
21	47	A. J. Allmendinger	JTG Daugherty Racing	Chevrolet	161	23
22	22	Joey Logano	Team Penske	Ford	161	22
23	20	Matt Kenseth	Joe Gibbs Racing	Toyota	161	22
24	7	Alex Bowman	Tommy Baldwin Racing	Chevrolet	161	20
25	35	Cole Whitt	Front Row Motorsports	Ford	161	19
26	83	Matt DiBenedetto (R)	BK Racing	Toyota	161	19
27	34	Brett Moffitt (R)	Front Row Motorsports	Ford	161	18
28	62	Brendan Gaughan (i)	Premium Motorsports	Chevrolet	161	0
29	2	Brad Keselowski	Team Penske	Ford	159	15
30	9	Sam Hornish Jr.	Richard Petty Motorsports	Ford	154	14
31	98	Josh Wise	Phil Parsons Racing	Ford	154	14
32	5	Kasey Kahne	Hendrick Motorsports	Chevrolet	149	13
33	23	J. J. Yeley (i)	BK Racing	Toyota	139	0
34	43	Aric Almirola	Richard Petty Motorsports	Ford	137	10
35	10	Danica Patrick	Stewart–Haas Racing	Chevrolet	126	9
36	26	Jeb Burton (R)	BK Racing	Toyota	121	8
37	46	Michael Annett	HScott Motorsports	Chevrolet	110	7
38	78	Martin Truex Jr.	Furniture Row Racing	Chevrolet	105	6
39	42	Kyle Larson	Chip Ganassi Racing	Chevrolet	103	5
40	38	David Gilliland	Front Row Motorsports	Ford	96	4
41	19	Carl Edwards	Joe Gibbs Racing	Toyota	85	3
42	33	Brian Scott (i)	Hillman-Circle Sport LLC	Chevrolet	85	0
43	32	Bobby Labonte	Go FAS Racing	Ford	2	1
Official Coke Zero 400 race results

=== Race statistics ===
- 22 lead changes among 12 different drivers
- 9 cautions for 43 laps
- Time of race: 2 hours, 58 minutes, 58 seconds
- Average speed: 134.941 mph (217.166 km/h)
- Dale Earnhardt Jr. took home $300,040 in winnings

Lap Leaders
Laps	Leader
1-8	Austin Dillon
9-26	Dale Earnhardt Jr.
27	Clint Bowyer
28	Ryan Newman
29	Jimmie Johnson
30-32	Dale Earnhardt Jr.
33-54	Jimmie Johnson
55	Denny Hamlin
56	J. J. Yeley (i)
57-75	Dale Earnhardt Jr.
76-78	Jimmie Johnson
79	Matt Kenseth
80-86	Jimmie Johnson
87	Matt DiBenedetto (R)
88	Josh Wise
89-93	Kasey Kahne
94-102	Denny Hamlin
103-111	Dale Earnhardt Jr.
112	Brett Moffitt (R)
113-114	Dale Earnhardt Jr.
115-116	Jimmie Johnson
117-161	Dale Earnhardt Jr.

Total laps led
Leader	Laps
Dale Earnhardt Jr.	96
Jimmie Johnson	35
Denny Hamlin	10
Austin Dillon	8
Kasey Kahne	5
Ryan Newman	1
Clint Bowyer	1
Matt Kenseth	1
Matt DiBenedetto (R)	1
Brett Moffitt (R)	1
Josh Wise	1
J. J. Yeley (i)	1

==== Race awards ====
- Coors Light Pole Award: None
- 3M Lap Leader: Dale Earnhardt Jr. (96 laps)
- American Ethanol Green Flag Restart Award: Carl Edwards
- Duralast Brakes "Bake In The Race" Award: Austin Dillon
- Freescale "Wide Open": Jimmie Johnson
- Ingersoll Rand Power Move: Kurt Busch (10 positions)
- MAHLE Clevite Engine Builder of the Race: Hendrick Engines, #88
- Mobil 1 Driver of the Race: Dale Earnhardt Jr. (131.9 driver rating)
- Moog Steering and Suspension Problem Solver of The Race: Austin Dillon (crew chief Richard Labbe (0.022 seconds))
- NASCAR Sprint Cup Leader Bonus: No winner: rolls over to $140,000 at next event
- Sherwin-Williams Fastest Lap: Casey Mears (Lap 78, 44.490, 202.297 mph (325.565 km/h))
- Sunoco Rookie of The Race: Matt DiBenedetto

== Media ==
=== Television ===
The 2015 Coke Zero 400 marked the return of NBC Sports to NASCAR, as part of a new ten-year deal replacing TNT and ESPN as broadcaster of the second half of the season; it was the first race broadcast by NBC since the 2006 Ford 400. Rick Allen, 2000 race winner Jeff Burton and Steve Letarte had the call in the booth for the race. Dave Burns, Mike Massaro, Marty Snider and Kelli Stavast handled pit road for the television side.

NBC
Booth announcers	Pit reporters
Lap-by-lap: Rick Allen; Color-commentator: Jeff Burton; Color-commentator: Steve Letarte	Dave Burns; Mike Massaro; Marty Snider; Kelli Stavast

=== Radio ===
MRN had the radio call for the race, which was simulcast on Sirius XM NASCAR Radio. Joe Moore, Jeff Striegle and Rusty Wallace called the race from the booth when the field was racing through the tri-oval. Dave Moody called the race from the Sunoco tower outside turn 2 when the field was racing through turns 1 & 2. Mike Bagley called the race from a platform on the inside of the track towards turn 3 when the field was racing down the backstretch. Kurt Becker called the race from the Sunoco tower outside turn 4 when the field was racing through turns 3 & 4. Alex Hayden, Winston Kelley and Steve Post worked pit road for the radio side.

MRN
Booth announcers	Turn announcers	Pit reporters
Lead announcer: Joe Moore; Announcer: Jeff Striegle; Announcer: Rusty Wallace	Turns 1 & 2: Dave Moody; Backstretch: Mike Bagley; Turns 3 & 4: Kurt Becker	Alex Hayden; Winston Kelley; Steve Post

== Standings after the race ==
Drivers' Championship standings

	Pos	Driver	Points
	1	Kevin Harvick	656
3	2	Dale Earnhardt Jr.	593 (–63)
1	3	Jimmie Johnson	589 (–67)
1	4	Joey Logano	581 (–75)
3	5	Martin Truex Jr.	569 (–87)
1	6	Jamie McMurray	526 (–130)
1	7	Brad Keselowski	520 (–120)
2	8	Kurt Busch	508 (–148)
	9	Matt Kenseth	501 (–155)
1	10	Jeff Gordon	500 (–156)
3	11	Kasey Kahne	496 (–160)
1	12	Denny Hamlin	480 (–176)
1	13	Paul Menard	480 (–176)
	14	Ryan Newman	472 (–184)
1	15	Clint Bowyer	465 (–191)
1	16	Aric Almirola	441 (–215)

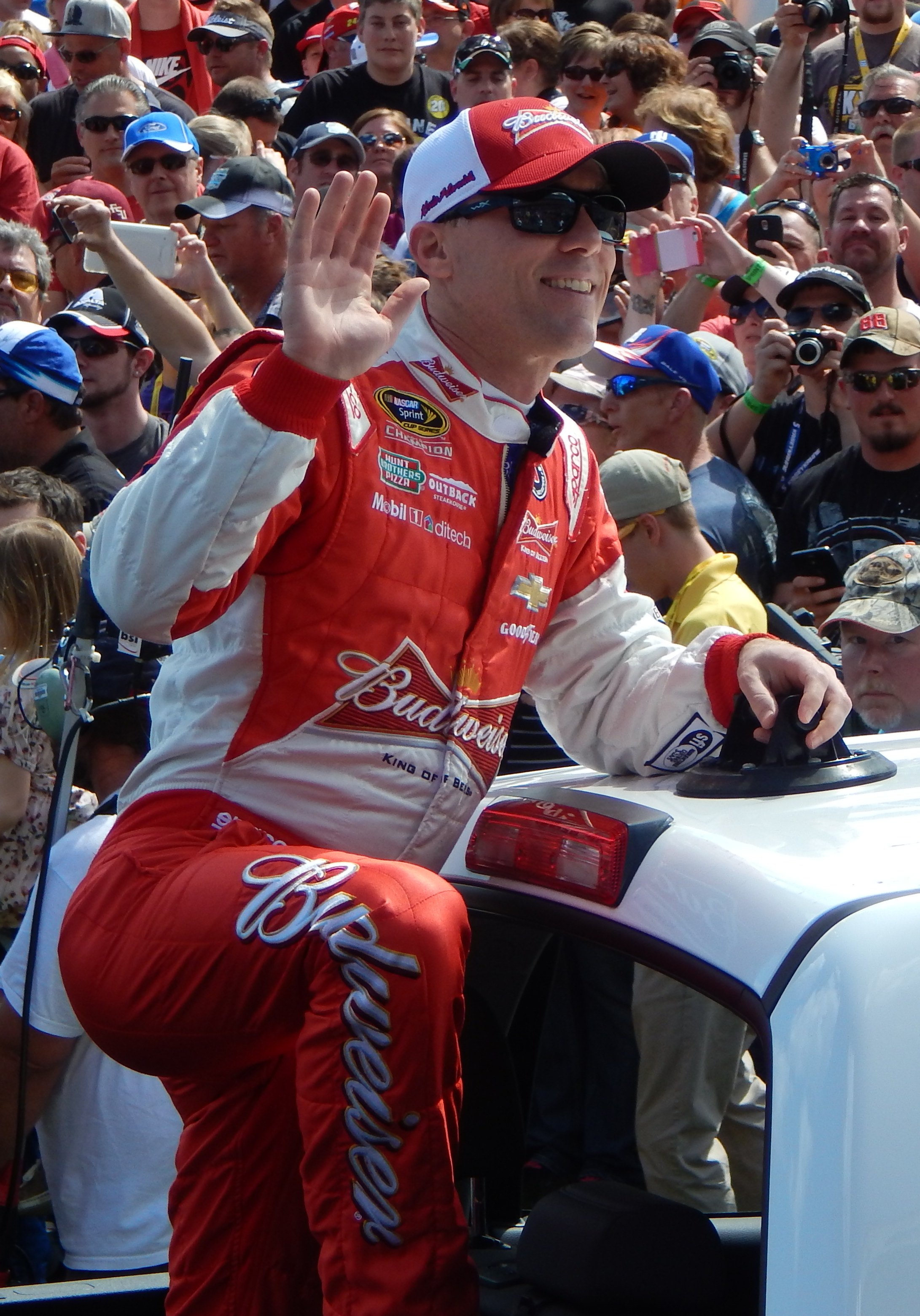
Kevin Harvick left Daytona with a 63-point lead over Dale Earnhardt Jr.

Manufacturers' Championship standings

Pos	Manufacturer	Points
1	Chevrolet	774
2	Ford	691 (–83)
3	Toyota	674 (–100)

- Note: Only the first sixteen positions are included for the driver standings.

== Note ==
Previous race: 2015 Toyota/Save Mart 350	Sprint Cup Series; 2015 season	Next race: 2015 Quaker State 400
