= 2015 Toyota/Save Mart 350 =

Race details
- Race 16 of 36 in the 2015 NASCAR Sprint Cup Series
- Date: June 28, 2015
- Location: Sonoma Raceway, Sonoma, California, U.S.
- Course: Permanent racing facility
- Course length: 1.99 miles (3.2 km)
- Distance: 110 laps, 218.9 mi (352 km)
- Weather: Clear blue skies with a temperature of 75 °F (24 °C); wind out of the west/southwest at 12 mph (19 km/h)
- Average speed: 74.774 mph (120.337 km/h)

Pole position
Driver	A. J. Allmendinger	JTG Daugherty Racing
- Time: 74.385

Most laps led
Driver	Jimmie Johnson	Hendrick Motorsports
- Laps: 45

Winner
No. 18	Kyle Busch	Joe Gibbs Racing

Television in the United States
- Network: Fox Sports 1
- Announcers: Mike Joy, Larry McReynolds, and Darrell Waltrip
- Nielsen ratings: 2.4/5 (Overnight); 2.4/5 (Final); 3.7 Million viewers

Radio in the United States
- Radio: PRN
- Booth announcers: Doug Rice, Mark Garrow and Wendy Venturini
- Turn announcers: Pat Patterson (2, 3 & 3a), Brad Gillie (4a, 7a & 8) and Rob Albright (9, 10 & 11)

The 2015 Toyota/Save Mart 350 was a NASCAR Sprint Cup Series race held on June 28, 2015, at Sonoma Raceway in Sonoma, California. Contested over 110 laps on the 1.99 mile (3.2 km) road course, it was the 16th race of the 2015 NASCAR Sprint Cup Series season. Kyle Busch won the race, first of the season and first since the 2014 Auto Club 400. Brother Kurt Busch finished runner-up and Clint Bowyer finished third. Kevin Harvick and Joey Logano rounded out the top five.

A. J. Allmendinger won the pole for the race and led one lap before engine issues took him out of contention and finished 37th. Jimmie Johnson led a race high of 45 laps before getting passed for the lead with a few laps to go and finished sixth. The race had nine lead changes among five different drivers, as well as five caution flag periods for 21 laps. There was one red flag period for ten minutes and 30 seconds.

This was the 30th career victory for Kyle Busch, second at Sonoma Raceway and fourth at the track for Joe Gibbs Racing. This win moved Busch up to 37th in the points standings. Despite being the winning manufacturer, Toyota left Sonoma trailing Chevrolet by 94 points in the manufacturer standings.

The Toyota/Save Mart 350 was carried by Fox Sports on the cable/satellite Fox Sports 1 network for the American television audience. The radio broadcast for the race was carried by the Performance Racing Network and Sirius XM NASCAR Radio.

== Report ==
=== Background ===
Sonoma Raceway, the track where the race was held.

Sonoma Raceway, is a 2.52-mile (4.06 km) road course and drag strip located on the landform known as Sears Point in the southern Sonoma Mountains in Sonoma, California, USA. The road course features 12 turns on a hilly course with 160 feet (49 m) of total elevation change.

Kevin Harvick entered Sonoma with a 15-point lead over Martin Truex Jr. Joey Logano entered 56 back. Dale Earnhardt Jr. entered 68 back. Jimmie Johnson entered 70 back.

==== New pit road policy ====
Following a miscommunication in the Xfinity race at Chicagoland Speedway that resulted in 19 cars pitting before pit road was officially opened, NASCAR announced that the indicator light at the entrance of pit road would be controlled by the officials in race control instead of an official at pit entrance.

==== Entry list ====
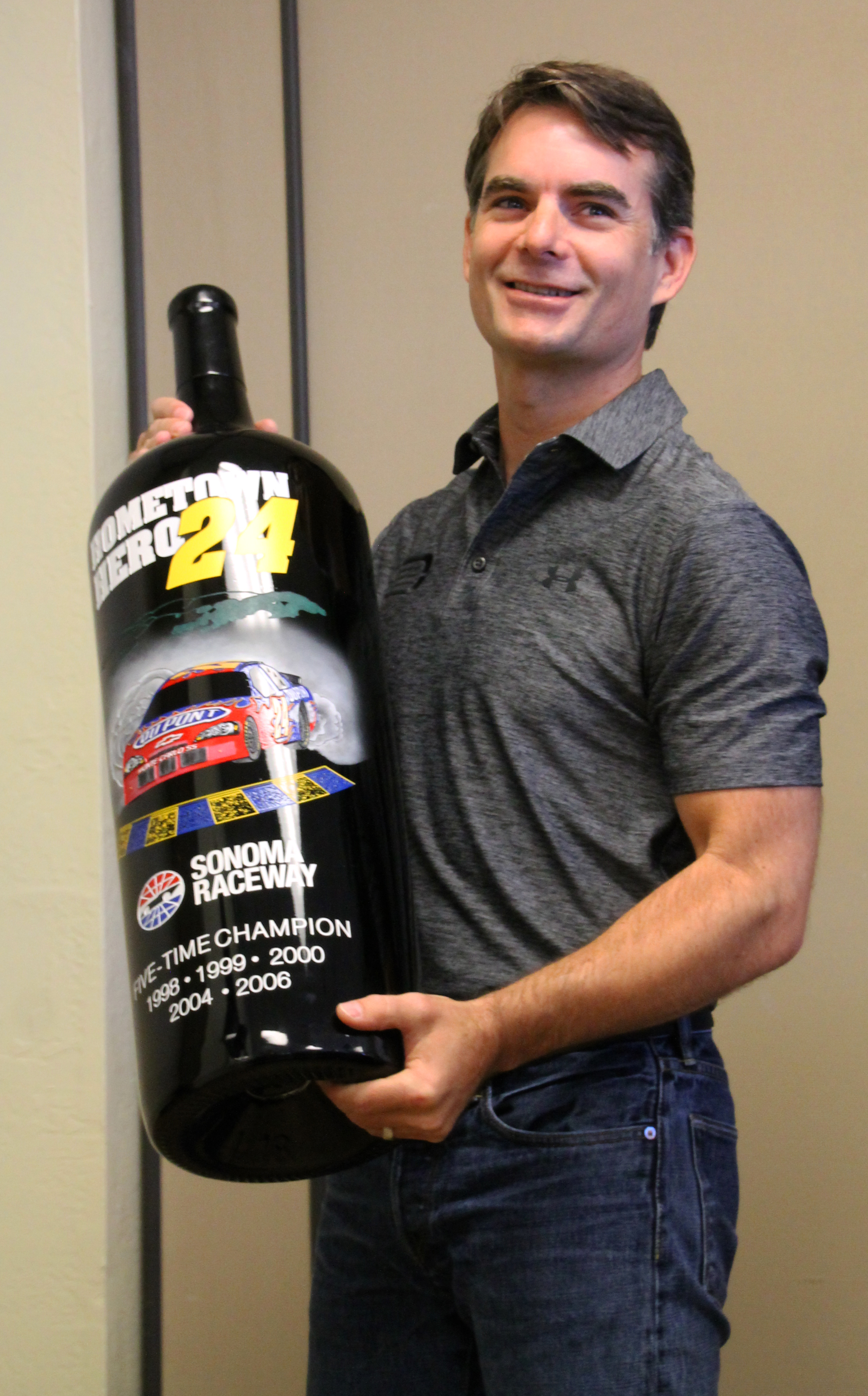
Jeff Gordon received a commemorative wine bottle celebrating his record holding wins and final race at Sonoma Raceway, 2015

The entry list for the Toyota/Save Mart 350 was released on Friday, June 19 at 2:32 p.m. Eastern time. Forty-four cars were entered for the race. All but the No. 95 Leavine Family Racing Ford driven by Michael McDowell were entered for the previous race at Michigan. Three driver changes took place for this weekend. Boris Said drove the No. 32 Go FAS Racing Ford in place of Mike Bliss. Alex Kennedy drove the No. 33 Hillman-Circle Sport LLC Chevrolet for Ty Dillon. Justin Marks attempted to make his first start of the season in the No. 34 Front Row Motorsports Ford for Brett Moffitt. The No. 98 Phil Parsons Racing entry, driven by Josh Wise, switched from Ford to Chevrolet for this race. Jeff Gordon, the all-time winningest driver at Sonoma Raceway, made his 23rd and final start at the track.

No.	Driver	Team	Manufacturer
1	Jamie McMurray	Chip Ganassi Racing	Chevrolet
2	Brad Keselowski (PC3)	Team Penske	Ford
3	Austin Dillon	Richard Childress Racing	Chevrolet
4	Kevin Harvick (PC1)	Stewart–Haas Racing	Chevrolet
5	Kasey Kahne	Hendrick Motorsports	Chevrolet
6	Trevor Bayne	Roush Fenway Racing	Ford
7	Alex Bowman	Tommy Baldwin Racing	Chevrolet
9	Sam Hornish Jr.	Richard Petty Motorsports	Ford
10	Danica Patrick	Stewart–Haas Racing	Chevrolet
11	Denny Hamlin	Joe Gibbs Racing	Toyota
13	Casey Mears	Germain Racing	Chevrolet
14	Tony Stewart (PC4)	Stewart–Haas Racing	Chevrolet
15	Clint Bowyer	Michael Waltrip Racing	Toyota
16	Greg Biffle	Roush Fenway Racing	Ford
17	Ricky Stenhouse Jr.	Roush Fenway Racing	Ford
18	Kyle Busch	Joe Gibbs Racing	Toyota
19	Carl Edwards	Joe Gibbs Racing	Toyota
20	Matt Kenseth (PC6)	Joe Gibbs Racing	Toyota
22	Joey Logano	Team Penske	Ford
23	J. J. Yeley (i)	BK Racing	Toyota
24	Jeff Gordon (PC7)	Hendrick Motorsports	Chevrolet
26	Jeb Burton (R)	BK Racing	Toyota
27	Paul Menard	Richard Childress Racing	Chevrolet
31	Ryan Newman	Richard Childress Racing	Chevrolet
32	Boris Said (i)	Go FAS Racing	Ford
33	Alex Kennedy (R)	Hillman-Circle Sport LLC	Chevrolet
34	Justin Marks (i)	Front Row Motorsports	Ford
35	Cole Whitt	Front Row Motorsports	Ford
38	David Gilliland	Front Row Motorsports	Ford
40	Landon Cassill (i)	Hillman-Circle Sport LLC	Chevrolet
41	Kurt Busch (PC5)	Stewart–Haas Racing	Chevrolet
42	Kyle Larson	Chip Ganassi Racing	Chevrolet
43	Aric Almirola	Richard Petty Motorsports	Ford
46	Michael Annett	HScott Motorsports	Chevrolet
47	A. J. Allmendinger	JTG Daugherty Racing	Chevrolet
48	Jimmie Johnson (PC2)	Hendrick Motorsports	Chevrolet
51	Justin Allgaier	HScott Motorsports	Chevrolet
55	David Ragan	Michael Waltrip Racing	Toyota
62	Brendan Gaughan (i)	Premium Motorsports	Chevrolet
78	Martin Truex Jr.	Furniture Row Racing	Chevrolet
83	Matt DiBenedetto (R)	BK Racing	Toyota
88	Dale Earnhardt Jr.	Hendrick Motorsports	Chevrolet
95	Michael McDowell	Leavine Family Racing	Ford
98	Josh Wise	Phil Parsons Racing	Chevrolet
Official initial entry list
Official final entry list

Key	Meaning
(R)	Rookie
(i)	Ineligible for points
(PC#)	Past champions provisional

== Practice ==
=== First practice ===
Clint Bowyer was the fastest in the first practice session with a time of 74.979 and a speed of 95.547 mph (153.768 km/h).

Pos	No.	Driver	Team	Manufacturer	Time	Speed
1	15	Clint Bowyer	Michael Waltrip Racing	Toyota	74.979	95.547
2	47	A. J. Allmendinger	JTG Daugherty Racing	Chevrolet	75.159	95.318
3	9	Sam Hornish Jr.	Richard Petty Motorsports	Ford	75.338	95.092
Official first practice results

=== Final practice ===
Kyle Busch was the fastest in the final practice session with a time of 74.489 and a speed of 96.175 mph (154.779 km/h).

Pos	No.	Driver	Team	Manufacturer	Time	Speed
1	18	Kyle Busch	Joe Gibbs Racing	Toyota	74.489	96.175
2	19	Carl Edwards	Joe Gibbs Racing	Toyota	74.602	96.030
3	41	Kurt Busch	Stewart–Haas Racing	Chevrolet	74.631	95.992
Official final practice results

== Qualifying ==
A. J. Allmendinger scored the pole for the race

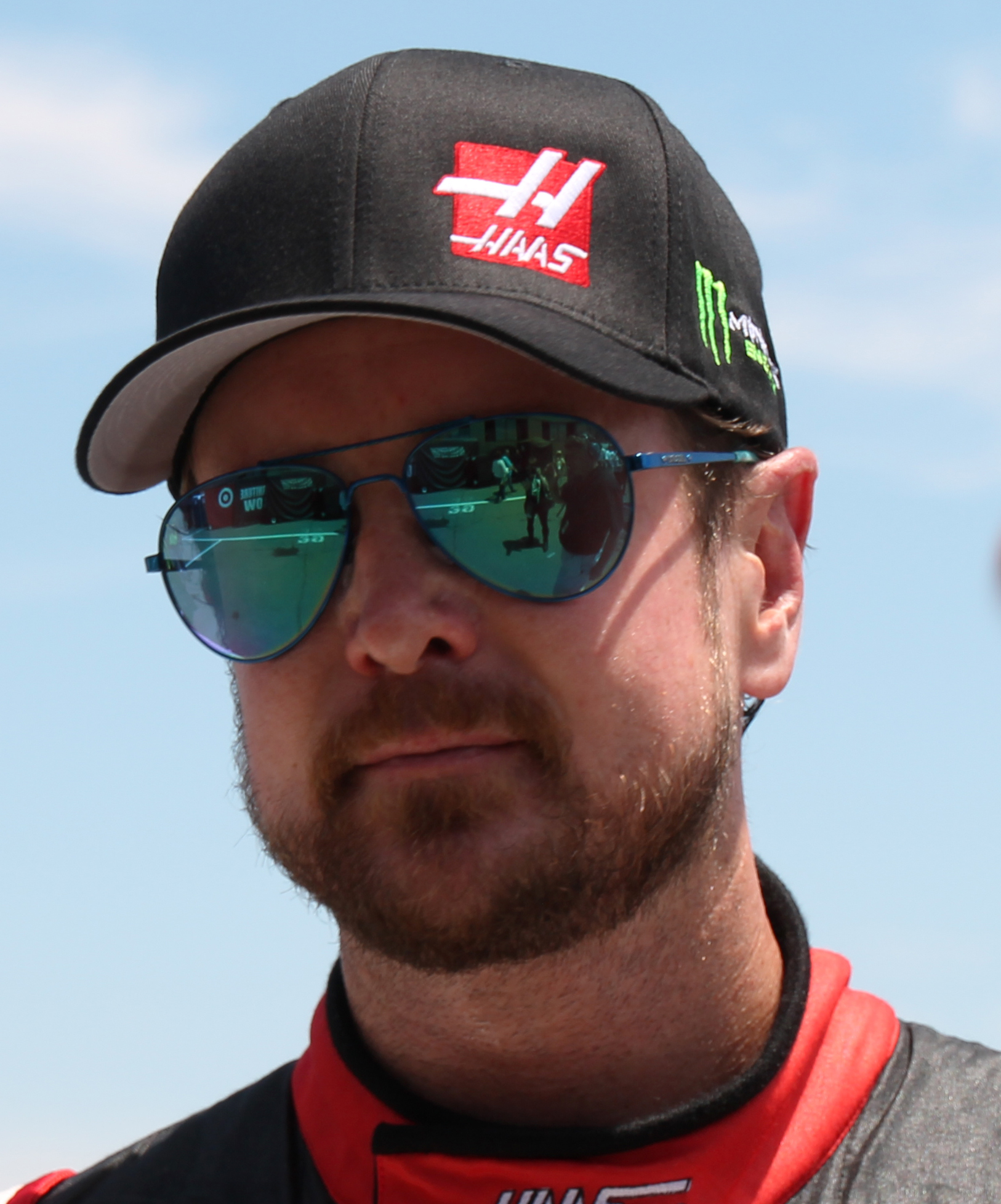
Kurt Busch took second during qualifications

A. J. Allmendinger won the pole with a time of 74.385 and a speed of 96.310 mph (154.996 km/h). "I’ve really got to thank all my guys that are here and especially back at the shop," Allmendinger said. "They’ve worked on this car so much to do everything that we need to get as much speed out of it as possible. So, it’s a good day, but we’ve got to focus on tomorrow.” “It has a nice balance all the way through, the braking and transmission gears, and the overall corner speed," Kurt Busch said after qualifying second. "It’s a nice package that (crew chief) Tony Gibson gave me, and all the guys back at the shop." “Yeah, we kind of overachieved today," Matt Kenseth said after qualifying third. "We were really bad yesterday, we were really bad the first round. I’m pleasantly surprised and kind of confused as far as we’ve been off, but we’ll take that.” "I think the car was capable of being at least first or second," Jeff Gordon said after qualifying fifth. "I missed one corner there on that last run and I don’t know how much that cost me, but overall it was a really solid effort." Brendan Gaughan was the lone driver that failed to make the race.

=== Qualifying results ===
Pos	No.	Driver	Team	Manufacturer	R1	R2
1	47	A. J. Allmendinger	JTG Daugherty Racing	Chevrolet	74.220	74.385
2	41	Kurt Busch	Stewart–Haas Racing	Chevrolet	74.672	74.551
3	20	Matt Kenseth	Joe Gibbs Racing	Toyota	74.661	74.624
4	42	Kyle Larson	Chip Ganassi Racing	Chevrolet	74.186	74.678
5	24	Jeff Gordon	Hendrick Motorsports	Chevrolet	74.501	74.699
6	15	Clint Bowyer	Michael Waltrip Racing	Toyota	74.679	74.715
7	14	Tony Stewart	Stewart–Haas Racing	Chevrolet	74.326	74.888
8	13	Casey Mears	Germain Racing	Chevrolet	74.624	74.966
9	55	David Ragan	Michael Waltrip Racing	Toyota	74.797	75.018
10	2	Brad Keselowski	Team Penske	Ford	74.598	75.175
11	18	Kyle Busch	Joe Gibbs Racing	Toyota	74.598	75.179
12	78	Martin Truex Jr.	Furniture Row Racing	Chevrolet	74.701	75.270
13	48	Jimmie Johnson	Hendrick Motorsports	Chevrolet	74.815	—
14	19	Carl Edwards	Joe Gibbs Racing	Toyota	74.833	—
15	11	Denny Hamlin	Joe Gibbs Racing	Toyota	74.973	—
16	31	Ryan Newman	Richard Childress Racing	Chevrolet	74.991	—
17	4	Kevin Harvick	Stewart–Haas Racing	Chevrolet	75.034	—
18	1	Jamie McMurray	Chip Ganassi Racing	Chevrolet	75.066	—
19	22	Joey Logano	Team Penske	Ford	75.081	—
20	88	Dale Earnhardt Jr.	Hendrick Motorsports	Chevrolet	75.102	—
21	10	Danica Patrick	Stewart–Haas Racing	Chevrolet	75.121	—
22	16	Greg Biffle	Roush Fenway Racing	Ford	75.138	—
23	95	Michael McDowell	Leavine Family Racing	Ford	75.145	—
24	9	Sam Hornish Jr.	Richard Petty Motorsports	Ford	75.246	—
25	43	Aric Almirola	Richard Petty Motorsports	Ford	75.344	—
26	5	Kasey Kahne	Hendrick Motorsports	Chevrolet	75.406	—
27	51	Justin Allgaier	HScott Motorsports	Chevrolet	75.474	—
28	38	David Gilliland	Front Row Motorsports	Ford	75.537	—
29	35	Cole Whitt	Front Row Motorsports	Ford	75.566	—
30	83	Matt DiBenedetto (R)	BK Racing	Toyota	75.638	—
31	6	Trevor Bayne	Roush Fenway Racing	Ford	75.782	—
32	27	Paul Menard (Note: Paul Menard started from the rear of the field for an engine change.)	Richard Childress Racing	Chevrolet	75.788	—
33	32	Boris Said (i)	Go FAS Racing	Ford	75.828	—
34	23	J. J. Yeley (i)	BK Racing	Toyota	75.857	—
35	34	Justin Marks (i)	Front Row Motorsports	Ford	75.954	—
36	33	Alex Kennedy (R)	Hillman-Circle Sport LLC	Chevrolet	76.106	—
37	3	Austin Dillon	Richard Childress Racing	Chevrolet	76.174	—
38	98	Josh Wise	Phil Parsons Racing	Chevrolet	76.216	—
39	40	Landon Cassill (i)	Hillman-Circle Sport LLC	Chevrolet	77.057	—
40	17	Ricky Stenhouse Jr.	Roush Fenway Racing	Ford	77.067	—
41	7	Alex Bowman	Tommy Baldwin Racing	Chevrolet	77.128	—
42	46	Michael Annett (Note: Michael Annett also started from the rear of the field for an engine change.)	HScott Motorsports	Chevrolet	77.551	—
43	26	Jeb Burton (R)	BK Racing	Toyota	77.658	—
Failed to qualify
44	62	Brendan Gaughan (i)	Premium Motorsports	Chevrolet	77.931	—
Official qualifying results

== Race ==
=== First half ===
==== Start ====
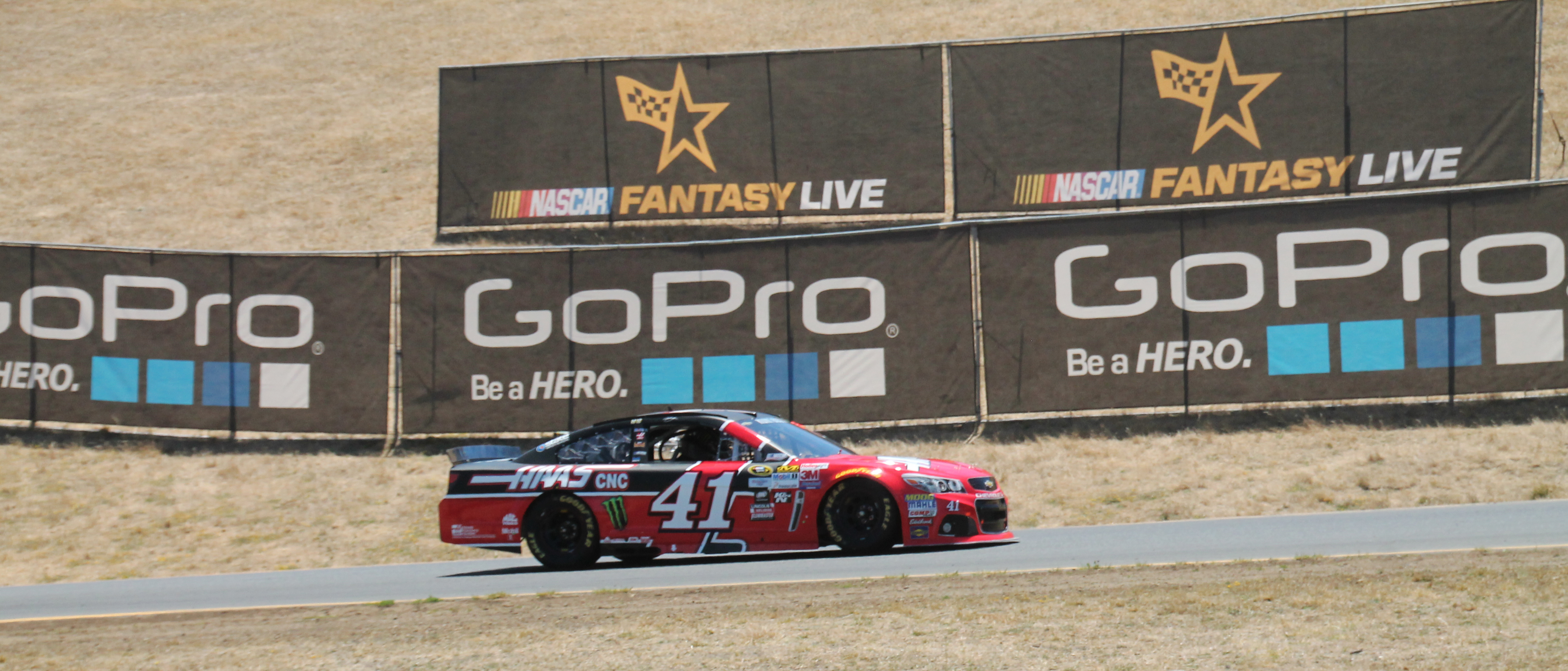
Kurt Busch dominated the early stages of the race.

The race was scheduled to start at 3:19 p.m. but started three minutes later when A. J. Allmendinger led the field to the green flag. Kurt Busch jumped ahead of Allmendinger in turn 2 and led the first lap. The field settled into a single file rhythm. Jamie McMurray made an unscheduled pit stop on lap 10 for a flat right side tire. Denny Hamlin also made an unscheduled pit stop on that lap for a loose right-rear tire. The first caution of the race flew on lap 22 when David Gilliland slid off the track and slammed into the tire barrier in turn 10 due to a flat left-front tire. “That was a bad deal," Gilliland said. "I just passed Sam Hornish Jr. up in seven and went through the esses and I just told Donnie (crew chief Wingo), ‘I think I’ve got a left-front going down. It’s soft.’ We were gonna come in and pit that lap and I eased up a little bit going through 10, but it never turned and once you get off in the dirt there that's a bad place to get off. "It was a big hit, but I’m OK. I’m just bummed out for the situation. This is a great race track. We really love racing out here and I’ve had some great finishes here, but we’ll have to wait until next year to try again.” Under caution, Clint Bowyer opted not to pit and assumed the lead.

==== Second quarter ====
The race restarted on lap 27. Kyle Busch passed Bowyer in turn 7a to take the lead one lap later. The second caution flew on lap 29 when David Ragan made contact with Martin Truex Jr. and turned him into the wall in turn 8. “When you’re mid-pack, it’s not a good place to be,” Truex Jr. told Fox. “It’s just really congested. We were a lot faster than a couple of guys around us and you’re trying not to get run over and you’re trying to make moves. Every time I passed the 55, he would just keep staying on the side of me and not giving me three or four inches to get clear so we could all get going. I guess he turned me on purpose. I ran into the side of him first, so I kind of had it coming. But that was an accident. I thought I gave him enough room there coming out of the esses.” Ragan gave his take on the incident after exiting the race on lap 79. “I didn’t get together with the '78', the '78' ran me off the race track, just body slammed me," said Ragan, who finished 39th. "I was just trying to get back on the race track. That’s a great instance where the '78' just absolutely did me wrong and I’m trying to get back on the race track. That’s unfortunate for him, it’s never good to see anybody tear up their race car. Martin would probably not do that again if he had an opportunity.” The damage to the concrete wall was severe enough that NASCAR red flagged the race on lap 32 for 10 minutes and 30 seconds.

The race restarted on lap 34. Kurt Busch passed brother Kyle Busch in turn 11 to take back the lead on lap 40. Matt Kenseth blew out a left-rear tire in turn 4a and had to make an unscheduled pit stop on lap 45. A number of drivers, including Jeff Gordon, began hitting pit road on lap 52. Kurt Busch gave up the lead on lap 53 to make his pit stop and gave it to Jimmie Johnson.

=== Second half ===
==== Halfway ====
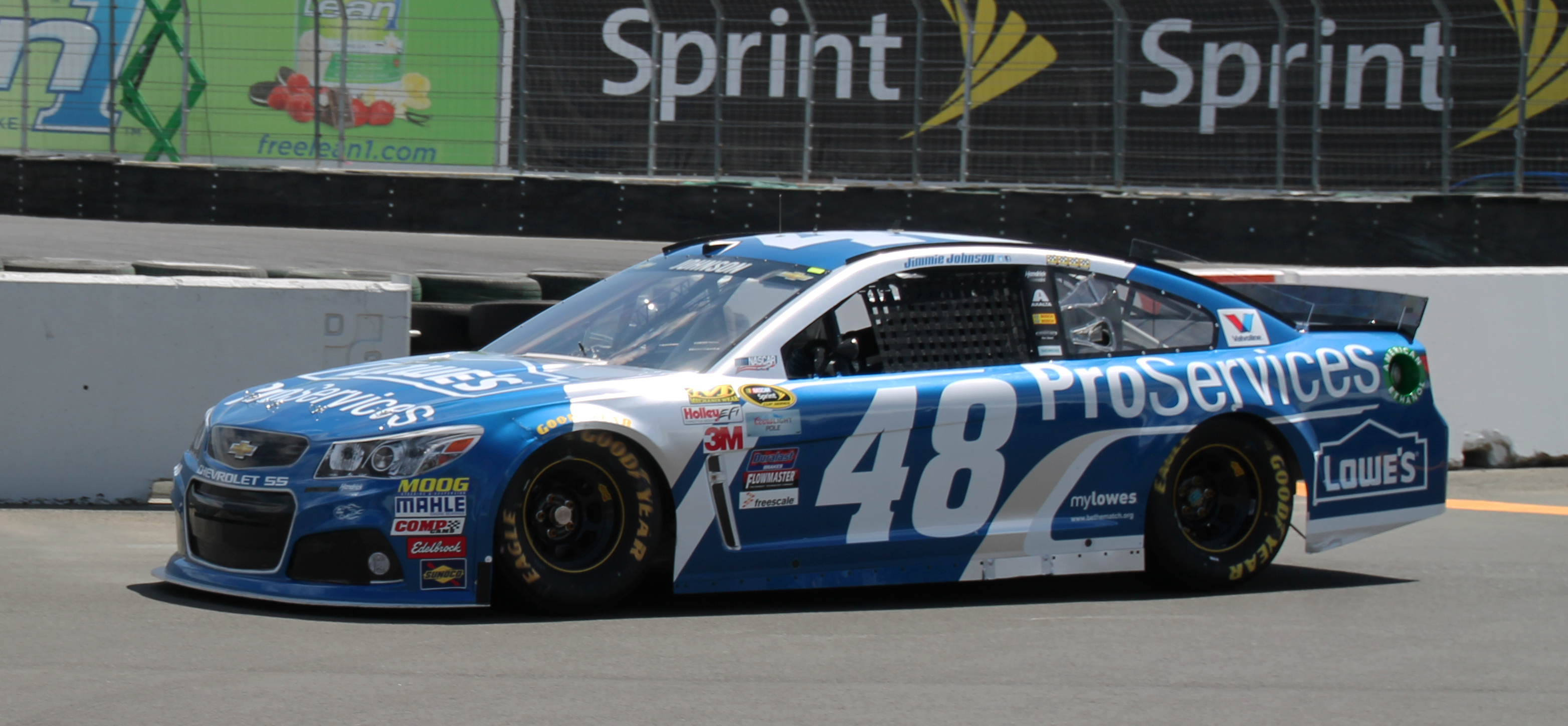
Jimmie Johnson led the most laps in the race.

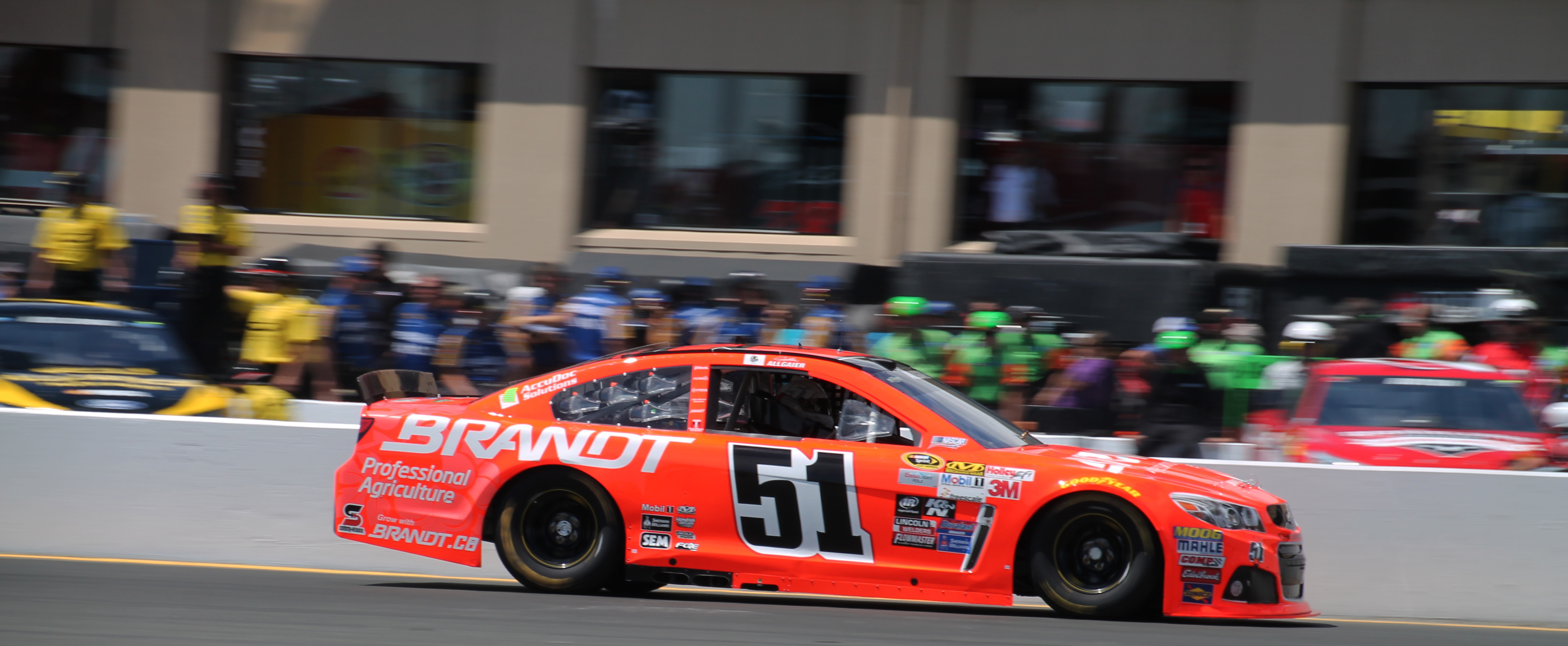
Justin Allgaier ran out of fuel halfway through the race.

Allmendinger began reporting fuel pickup issues on lap 57. He made an unscheduled pit stop on lap 60. Justin Allgaier ran out of fuel on lap 65, but coasted the car back to pit road and the race stayed green. Johnson hit pit road on lap 67 and the lead was given back to Kurt Busch. The third caution of the race flew on lap 74 when J. J. Yeley, exiting turn 10, got loose and hit the inside wall. Johnson opted not to pit and reassumed the lead.

The race restarted with 32 laps to go. The fourth caution of the race flew on the same lap when Carl Edwards, entering the esses, hit Ragan and spun down into the wall.

==== Fourth quarter ====
The race restarted with 26 laps to go. Kurt Busch went off track in turn 10 with 14 laps to go. The air intake became covered with grass. Debris on the front stretch brought out the fifth caution of the race with twelve laps to go. Exiting turn 11, the left-rear wheel house of Casey Mears's car came off. While Johnson opted to stay out, almost every other driver opted to pit for tires. Coming into his pit box, Matt DiBenedetto got clipped and turned by one of the track's cleanup trucks.

The race restarted with seven laps to go. Kyle Busch passed Johnson climbing up turn 3 to take the lead with five laps to go. Michael McDowell went off track in turn 7a with three to go, but got the car going and the race remained green. Kyle Busch drove away to score his 30th career win. And it is also the first time that the Busch brothers had a 1–2 with Kyle in first and his brother, Kurt, in second.

== Post-race ==
=== Driver comments ===
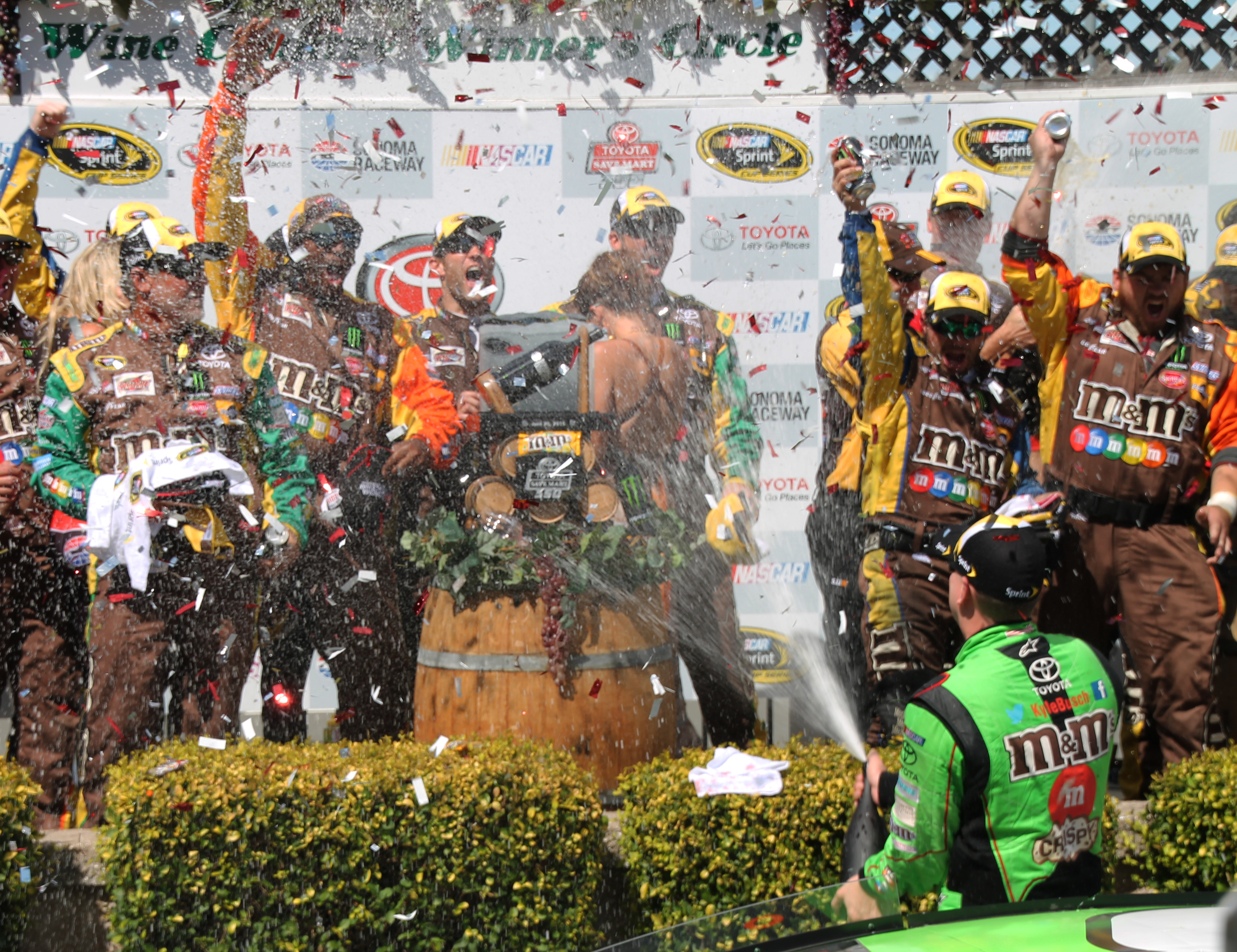
Kyle Busch celebrating winning the 2015 Toyota/Save Mart 350.

“This is awesome – it’s unbelievable," said Busch. "Can’t say enough about my team, everyone at Joe Gibbs Racing. I can’t say enough about my medical team that got me back in shape and ready to go behind the wheel. We have our work cut out for us, we knew we did in the beginning and I knew we put us in the hole in points. It’s unfortunate that we’ve had a couple crashes. I hate it for my guys, they don’t deserve to be in that spot. They have certainly worked hard all year long." "Just a lot of things went wrong. We had probably the fastest car on the racetrack it just took us all day to overcome all the stuff we had going on," said Harvick after finishing fourth. "Just want to thank Budweiser, Outback, Folds of Honor, everybody from Jimmy John's and Chevrolet for everything they do for our team." "I saw there were a bunch of cars between myself and the first guy on (new) tires," Johnson said after finishing sixth. "I felt pretty good about things. And then after about a lap and a half, I wasn't feeling so good about things. They were there quickly. But if we came back tomorrow, we'd still run the same strategy. We played it perfectly." "They dropped the green and we were moving forward," Gordon said after finishing 16th in his final start at Sonoma Raceway. "I was pretty happy with it. I felt that rear starting to go off pretty early on and saw some guys coming from further back. And so we tried to make a couple of adjustments. It just seemed as the track continued to lay rubber, our set-up, which we were taking a little bit of a gamble and risk with, but it looked good in practice; but it just didn’t pay off for us. The car was really, really good there at the end. Nothing’s going to take away from this weekend for me. I know it wasn’t the finish we all wanted, but it was a very memorable weekend. It’s still a little bit more fun to go to hang out with some of my friends and family here. But, I hate that we weren’t a little bit better. And that last thing, I was just taking some risk on that last pit stop. We didn’t have anything to lose at that point.”

== Race results ==
Pos	No.	Driver	Team	Manufacturer	Laps	Points
1	18	Kyle Busch	Joe Gibbs Racing	Toyota	110	47
2	41	Kurt Busch	Stewart–Haas Racing	Chevrolet	110	43
3	15	Clint Bowyer	Michael Waltrip Racing	Toyota	110	42
4	4	Kevin Harvick	Stewart–Haas Racing	Chevrolet	110	40
5	22	Joey Logano	Team Penske	Ford	110	39
6	48	Jimmie Johnson	Hendrick Motorsports	Chevrolet	110	40
7	88	Dale Earnhardt Jr.	Hendrick Motorsports	Chevrolet	110	37
8	5	Kasey Kahne	Hendrick Motorsports	Chevrolet	110	36
9	31	Ryan Newman	Richard Childress Racing	Chevrolet	110	35
10	9	Sam Hornish Jr.	Richard Petty Motorsports	Ford	110	34
11	1	Jamie McMurray	Chip Ganassi Racing	Chevrolet	110	33
12	14	Tony Stewart	Stewart–Haas Racing	Chevrolet	110	32
13	27	Paul Menard	Richard Childress Racing	Chevrolet	110	31
14	43	Aric Almirola	Richard Petty Motorsports	Ford	110	30
15	42	Kyle Larson	Chip Ganassi Racing	Chevrolet	110	29
16	24	Jeff Gordon	Hendrick Motorsports	Chevrolet	110	28
17	3	Austin Dillon	Richard Childress Racing	Chevrolet	110	27
18	11	Denny Hamlin	Joe Gibbs Racing	Toyota	110	26
19	2	Brad Keselowski	Team Penske	Ford	110	25
20	17	Ricky Stenhouse Jr.	Roush Fenway Racing	Ford	110	24
21	20	Matt Kenseth	Joe Gibbs Racing	Toyota	110	23
22	35	Cole Whitt	Front Row Motorsports	Ford	110	22
23	6	Trevor Bayne	Roush Fenway Racing	Ford	110	21
24	10	Danica Patrick	Stewart–Haas Racing	Chevrolet	110	20
25	33	Alex Kennedy (R)	Hillman-Circle Sport LLC	Chevrolet	110	19
26	32	Boris Said (i)	Go FAS Racing	Ford	110	0
27	16	Greg Biffle	Roush Fenway Racing	Ford	110	17
28	98	Josh Wise	Phil Parsons Racing	Chevrolet	109	16
29	83	Matt DiBenedetto (R)	BK Racing	Toyota	109	15
30	34	Justin Marks (i)	Front Row Motorsports	Ford	109	0
31	7	Alex Bowman	Tommy Baldwin Racing	Chevrolet	109	13
32	26	Jeb Burton (R)	BK Racing	Toyota	109	12
33	46	Michael Annett	HScott Motorsports	Chevrolet	109	11
34	95	Michael McDowell	Leavine Family Racing	Ford	109	10
35	51	Justin Allgaier	HScott Motorsports	Chevrolet	107	9
36	40	Landon Cassill (i)	Hillman-Circle Sport LLC	Chevrolet	99	0
37	47	A. J. Allmendinger	JTG Daugherty Racing	Chevrolet	98	8
38	13	Casey Mears	Germain Racing	Chevrolet	97	6
39	55	David Ragan	Michael Waltrip Racing	Toyota	78	5
40	19	Carl Edwards	Joe Gibbs Racing	Toyota	78	4
41	23	J. J. Yeley (i)	BK Racing	Toyota	71	0
42	78	Martin Truex Jr.	Furniture Row Racing	Chevrolet	31	2
43	38	David Gilliland	Front Row Motorsports	Ford	20	1
Official Toyota/Save Mart 350 results

=== Race statistics ===
- 9 lead changes among 5 different drivers
- 5 cautions for 21 laps; 1 red flag for 10 minutes, 30 seconds
- Time of race: 2 hours, 55 minutes, 39 seconds
- Average speed: 74.774 mph (120.337 km/h)
- Kyle Busch took home $315,481 in winnings

Lap Leaders
Laps	Leader
1-22	Kurt Busch
23	A. J. Allmendinger
24-27	Clint Bowyer
28-39	Kyle Busch
40-52	Kurt Busch
53-66	Jimmie Johnson
67-74	Kurt Busch
75-105	Jimmie Johnson
106-110	Kyle Busch

Total laps led
Leader	Laps
Jimmie Johnson	45
Kurt Busch	43
Kyle Busch	17
Clint Bowyer	4
A. J. Allmendinger	1

==== Race awards ====
- Coors Light Pole Award: A. J. Allmendinger (1:14.385, 96.310 mph (154.996 km/h))
- 3M Lap Leader: Jimmie Johnson (45 laps)
- American Ethanol Green Flag Restart Award: Kyle Busch
- Duralast Brakes "Bake In The Race" Award: Kurt Busch
- Freescale "Wide Open": Kurt Busch
- Ingersoll Rand Power Move: Sam Hornish Jr. (8 positions)
- MAHLE Clevite Engine Builder of the Race: Hendrick Engines, #41
- Mobil 1 Driver of the Race: Kurt Busch (137.7 driver rating)
- Moog Steering and Suspension Problem Solver of The Race: Joey Logano (crew chief Todd Gordon (0.570))
- NASCAR Sprint Cup Leader Bonus: No winner: rolls over to $130,000 at next event
- Sherwin-Williams Fastest Lap: A. J. Allmendinger (Lap, 1:15.570, 94.802 mph (152.569 km/h))
- Sunoco Rookie of The Race: Alex Kennedy

== Media ==
=== Television ===
Fox Sports covered their seventh race at Sonoma Raceway and their first since 2006. Mike Joy, Larry McReynolds and Darrell Waltrip had the call in the booth for the race. Jamie Little, Chris Neville, Vince Welch and Matt Yocum handled the pit road duties for the television side.

Fox Sports 1
Booth announcers	Pit reporters
Lap-by-lap: Mike Joy; Color-commentator: Larry McReynolds; Color-commentator: Darrell Waltrip	Jamie Little; Chris Neville; Vince Welch; Matt Yocum

=== Radio ===
PRN had the radio call for the race, which was simulcast on Sirius XM NASCAR Radio. Doug Rice and Mark Garrow called the race in the booth when the field was racing past the pit straight. Pat Patterson called the race from atop turn 3a when the field was racing up turns 2, 3 and 3a. Brad Gillie called the race from a platform outside turn 7a when the field was racing through turns 4a, 7a and 8. Rob Albright called the race from a billboard outside turn 10 when the field was racing down turns 8a, 9 and 10. Heather DuBoise, Brett McMillan, Jim Noble and Steve Richards worked pit road for PRN.

PRN
Booth announcers	Turn announcers	Pit reporters
Lead announcer: Doug Rice; Announcer: Mark Garrow; Announcer: Wendy Venturini	Turns 2, 3 & 3a: Pat Patterson; Turns 4a, 7a & 8: Brad Gillie; Turns 8a, 9 & 10: Rob Albright	Heather DuBoise; Brett McMillan; Jim Noble; Steve Richards

== Standings after the race ==
Drivers' Championship standings

	Pos	Driver	Points
	1	Kevin Harvick	616
	2	Martin Truex Jr.	563 (–53)
	3	Joey Logano	559 (–57)
1	4	Jimmie Johnson	546 (–70)
1	5	Dale Earnhardt Jr.	545 (–71)
	6	Brad Keselowski	505 (–111)
	7	Jamie McMurray	497 (–119)
1	8	Kasey Kahne	483 (–133)
1	9	Matt Kenseth	479 (–137)
1	10	Kurt Busch	469 (–147)
1	11	Jeff Gordon	462 (–154)
	12	Paul Menard	452 (–164)
	13	Denny Hamlin	438 (–178)
2	14	Ryan Newman	435 (–181)
	15	Aric Almirola	431 (–185)
1	16	Clint Bowyer	430 (–186)

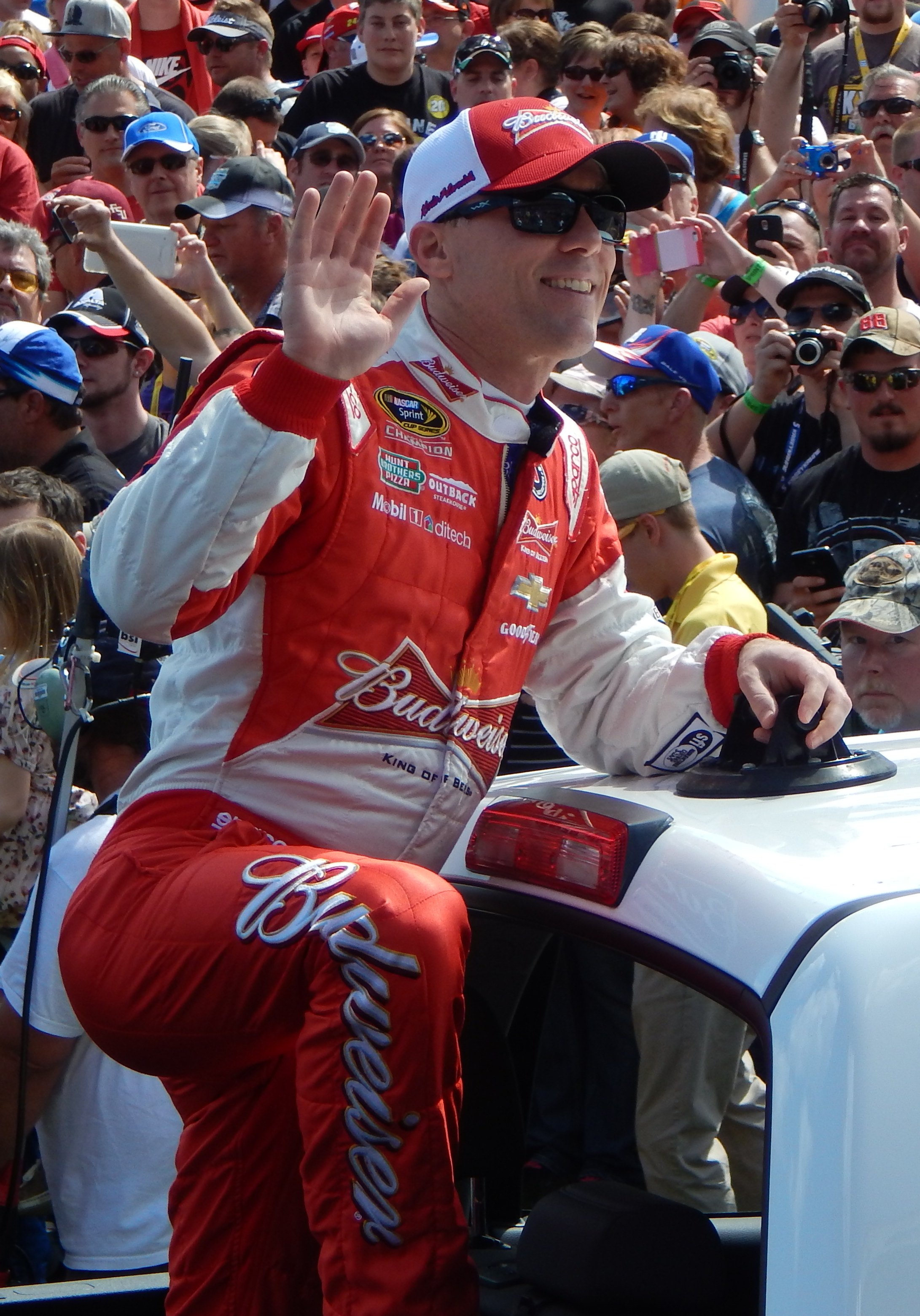
Kevin Harvick left Sonoma with 53 point lead over Martin Truex Jr.

Manufacturers' Championship standings

Pos	Manufacturer	Points
1	Chevrolet	726
2	Ford	656 (–70)
3	Toyota	632 (–94)

- Note: Only the first sixteen positions are included for the driver standings.

== Notes ==
Previous race: 2015 Quicken Loans 400	Sprint Cup Series; 2015 season	Next race: 2015 Coke Zero 400
