= 2015 Quaker State 400 =

Race details
- Race 18 of 36 in the 2015 NASCAR Sprint Cup Series
- Date: July 11, 2015
- Location: Kentucky Speedway in Sparta, Kentucky
- Course: Permanent racing facility
- Course length: 1.5 miles (2.414 km)
- Distance: 267 laps, 400.5 mi (644.542 km)
- Weather: Mostly clear night skies with a temperature of 80 °F (27 °C); wind out of the northeast at 1 mph (1.6 km/h)
- Average speed: 129.402 mph (208.252 km/h)

Pole position
Driver	Kyle Larson	Chip Ganassi Racing
- Time: 29.583 (Note: Qualifying was canceled and the starting lineup was determined by the first practice session.)

Most laps led
Driver	Kyle Busch	Joe Gibbs Racing
- Laps: 163

Winner
No. 18	Kyle Busch	Joe Gibbs Racing

Television in the United States
- Network: NBCSN
- Announcers: Rick Allen, Jeff Burton and Steve Letarte
- Nielsen ratings: 2.0/3 (Overnight); 2.0/3 (Final); 3.2 Million viewers

Radio in the United States
- Radio: PRN
- Booth announcers: Doug Rice, Mar Garrow and Wendy Venturini
- Turn announcers: Rob Albright (1 & 2) and Pat Patterson (3 & 4)

The 2015 Quaker State 400 was a NASCAR Sprint Cup Series race held on July 11, 2015, at Kentucky Speedway in Sparta, Kentucky. Contested over 267 laps on the 1.5-mile (2.4-kilometre) speedway, it was the 18th race of the 2015 NASCAR Sprint Cup Series season. Kyle Busch won the race, his second of the season. Joey Logano finished second. Denny Hamlin finished third. Carl Edwards and Matt Kenseth rounded out the top five.

With qualifying canceled for bad weather, Kyle Larson was awarded the first starting spot. He failed to lead a single lap and finished a disappointing 35th after cutting down a tire and crashing out late in the race. Busch led a race high of 163 laps on his way to winning the race. The race had 13 lead changes among eight different drivers, as well as a new track record of eleven caution flag periods for 49 laps.

This was the 31st career victory for Kyle Busch, second at Kentucky Speedway, and third at the track for Joe Gibbs Racing. This win moved Busch up to 35th in the points, 87 points behind Cole Whitt for the 30th place Chase for the Sprint Cup cutoff, and 492 behind points leader Kevin Harvick. Despite being the winning manufacturer, Toyota left Kentucky trailing Chevrolet by 83 points in the manufacturer standings.

The Quaker State 400 was carried by NBC Sports on the cable/satellite NBCSN station for the American television audience. The radio broadcast for the race was carried by the Performance Racing Network and Sirius XM NASCAR Radio.

== Report ==
=== Background ===
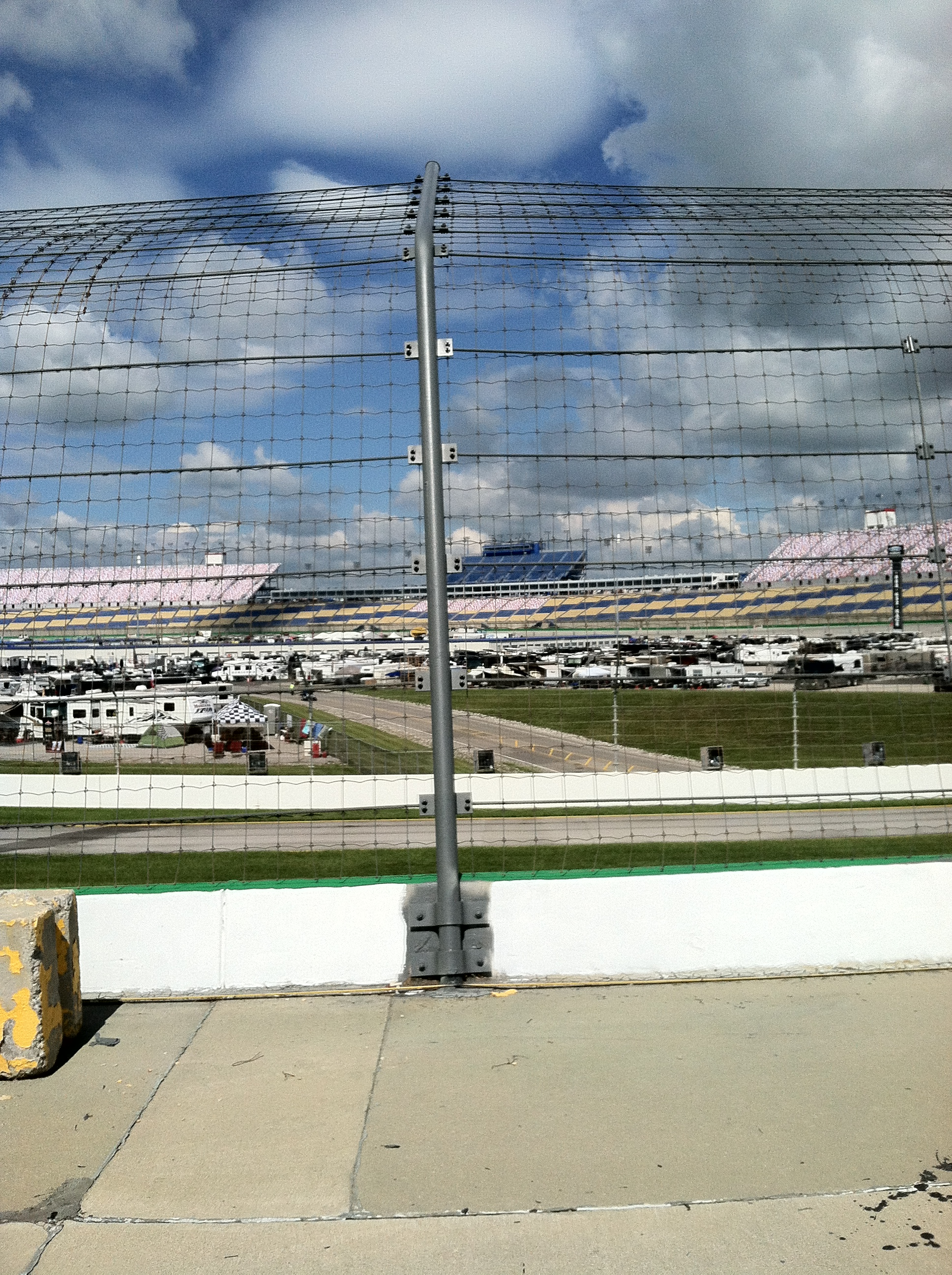
Kentucky Speedway, the track where the race was held.

Kentucky Speedway is a 1.5-mile (2.4-kilometre) tri-oval speedway in Sparta, Kentucky.

Kevin Harvick entered Kentucky with a 63-point lead over Dale Earnhardt Jr. Jimmie Johnson entered 67 back, Joey Logano entered 75 back, and Martin Truex Jr. entered 87 back.

==== New aero package ====
On June 16, NASCAR announced that a new aero package would be used for this weekend's race at Kentucky Speedway. The changes included a smaller rear spoiler and other adjustments that significantly reduced aerodynamic downforce. The spoiler was 3.5 inches (8.9 centimetres) tall. There was also a 25-inch (64-centimetre) wide splitter extension. In addition, tires supplied by Goodyear provided drivers with more grip. "We want to see more lead changes on the racetrack," NASCAR Executive Vice-president and Chief Racing Development Officer Steve O'Donnell said in a media teleconference. "We'll evaluate that and a number of different factors coming out of Kentucky, see what we can learn and implement down the road." Originally, the package was to be used at this year's All-Star Race, but the plan was scrubbed and NASCAR opted to use the package for a points race. "Let me be clear. This is not a test, this is a race," O'Donnell said of the rules package that was in effect for the 18th round of the 2015 Sprint Cup Series. "We've had an extensive testing plan with the industry over the last 18 months. We wouldn't implement this if we didn't feel confident as an industry to implement it at Kentucky."

==== Tire allotment ====
For this weekend's race, teams were given nine sets of Goodyear tires versus the normal allotment of eleven.

==== Entry list ====
The entry list for the Quaker State 400 was released on Monday, July 6 at 2:19 p.m. Eastern time. Forty-six drivers were entered for the race. All but the No. 30 Chevrolet of The Motorsports Group were entered for the previous week's Coke Zero 400. The three driver changes for this week were Will Kimmel in the No. 32 Go FAS Racing Ford, Alex Kennedy in the No. 33 Hillman-Circle Sport LLC Chevrolet, and Reed Sorenson in the No. 62 Premium Motorsports Chevrolet.

No.	Driver	Team	Manufacturer
1	Jamie McMurray	Chip Ganassi Racing	Chevrolet
2	Brad Keselowski (PC3)	Team Penske	Ford
3	Austin Dillon	Richard Childress Racing	Chevrolet
4	Kevin Harvick (PC1)	Stewart–Haas Racing	Chevrolet
5	Kasey Kahne	Hendrick Motorsports	Chevrolet
6	Trevor Bayne	Roush Fenway Racing	Ford
7	Alex Bowman	Tommy Baldwin Racing	Chevrolet
9	Sam Hornish Jr.	Richard Petty Motorsports	Ford
10	Danica Patrick	Stewart–Haas Racing	Chevrolet
11	Denny Hamlin	Joe Gibbs Racing	Toyota
13	Casey Mears	Germain Racing	Chevrolet
14	Tony Stewart (PC4)	Stewart–Haas Racing	Chevrolet
15	Clint Bowyer	Michael Waltrip Racing	Toyota
16	Greg Biffle	Roush Fenway Racing	Ford
17	Ricky Stenhouse Jr.	Roush Fenway Racing	Ford
18	Kyle Busch	Joe Gibbs Racing	Toyota
19	Carl Edwards	Joe Gibbs Racing	Toyota
20	Matt Kenseth (PC6)	Joe Gibbs Racing	Toyota
21	Ryan Blaney (i)	Wood Brothers Racing	Ford
22	Joey Logano	Team Penske	Ford
23	J. J. Yeley (i)	BK Racing	Toyota
24	Jeff Gordon (PC7)	Hendrick Motorsports	Chevrolet
26	Jeb Burton (R)	BK Racing	Toyota
27	Paul Menard	Richard Childress Racing	Chevrolet
30	Travis Kvapil (i)	The Motorsports Group	Chevrolet
31	Ryan Newman	Richard Childress Racing	Chevrolet
32	Will Kimmel	Go FAS Racing	Ford
33	Alex Kennedy (R)	Hillman-Circle Sport LLC	Chevrolet
34	Brett Moffitt (R)	Front Row Motorsports	Ford
35	Cole Whitt	Front Row Motorsports	Ford
38	David Gilliland	Front Row Motorsports	Ford
40	Landon Cassill (i)	Hillman-Circle Sport LLC	Chevrolet
41	Kurt Busch (PC5)	Stewart–Haas Racing	Chevrolet
42	Kyle Larson	Chip Ganassi Racing	Chevrolet
43	Aric Almirola	Richard Petty Motorsports	Ford
46	Michael Annett	HScott Motorsports	Chevrolet
47	A. J. Allmendinger	JTG Daugherty Racing	Chevrolet
48	Jimmie Johnson (PC2)	Hendrick Motorsports	Chevrolet
51	Justin Allgaier	HScott Motorsports	Chevrolet
55	David Ragan	Michael Waltrip Racing	Toyota
62	Reed Sorenson	Premium Motorsports	Chevrolet
78	Martin Truex Jr.	Furniture Row Racing	Chevrolet
83	Matt DiBenedetto (R)	BK Racing	Toyota
88	Dale Earnhardt Jr.	Hendrick Motorsports	Chevrolet
95	Michael McDowell	Leavine Family Racing	Ford
98	Josh Wise	Phil Parsons Racing	Ford
Official initial entry list
Official final entry list

Key	Meaning
(R)	Rookie
(i)	Ineligible for points
(PC#)	Past champions provisional

== First practice ==
Kyle Larson was the fastest in the first practice session with a time of 29.583 and a speed of 182.537 mph (293.765 km/h).

Pos	No.	Driver	Team	Manufacturer	Time	Speed
1	42	Kyle Larson	Chip Ganassi Racing	Chevrolet	29.583	182.537
2	2	Brad Keselowski	Team Penske	Ford	29.729	181.641
3	24	Jeff Gordon	Hendrick Motorsports	Chevrolet	29.938	180.373
Official first practice results

== Qualifying ==
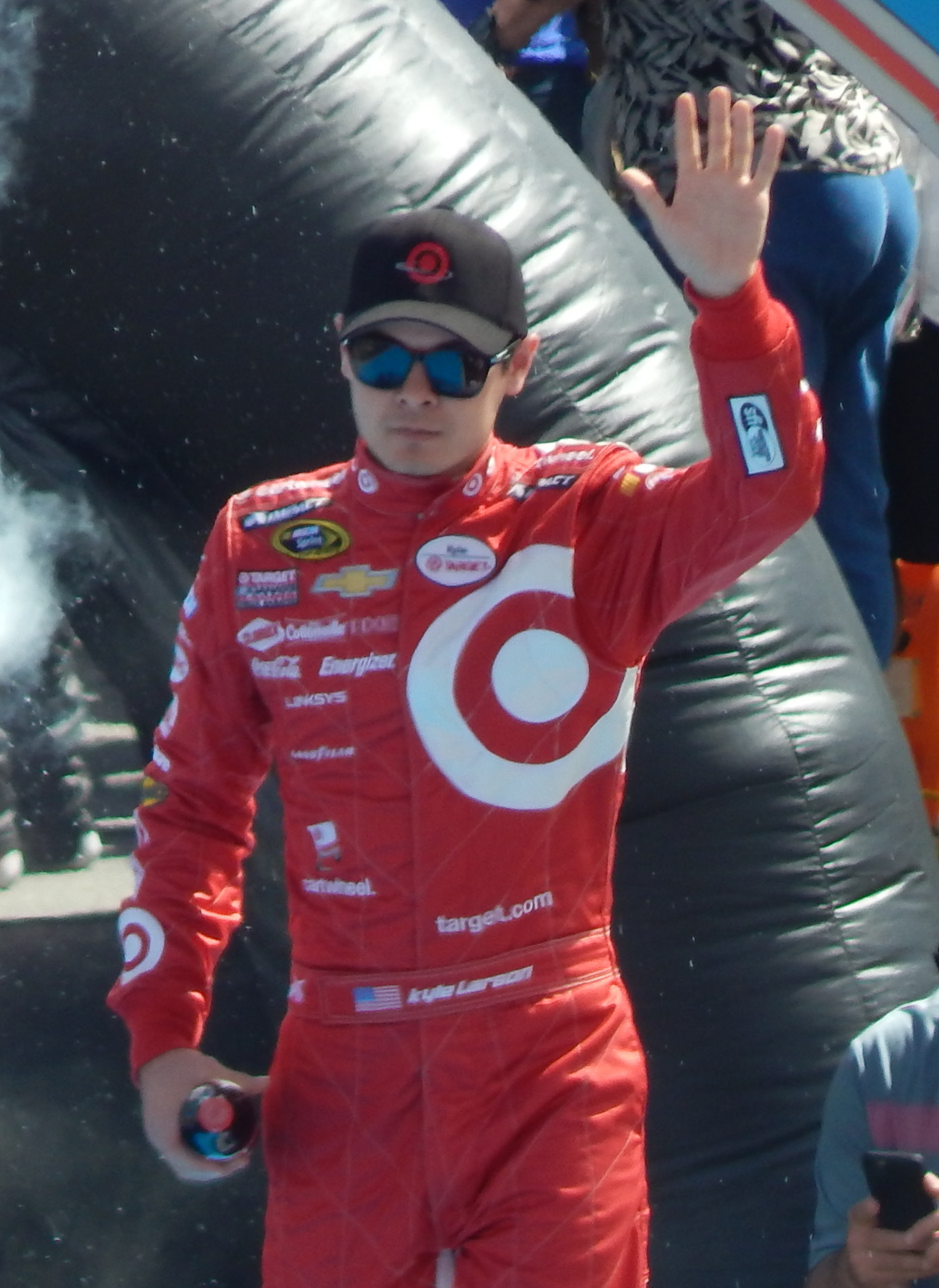
Kyle Larson, seen here at the 2015 Daytona 500, was awarded the first starting spot as a result of qualifying being canceled.

"Under all the circumstances we were faced with (at Kentucky) … the desire from the majority of the garage to get some more time on the track prior to the race became our priority at that point. And then the challenges we had drying the track. We didn't know if we'd even get to a point where we could get cars on the track, so we elected to go early and have everybody focus on setting up for the race. One of the challenges for the teams is it's a three-hour transition going to qualifying trim vs. going back. It also helped the teams that were there to really prepare everything for the race vs. qualifying. Certainly, we can be challenged for that, but it was something that that race and the circumstances dictated for us, and, ultimately, the decision we made wanting to put the best possible race on Saturday night."

— NASCAR Executive Vice-President Steve O'Donnell speaking on Sirius XM NASCAR Radio.

Three rounds of knockout qualifying were to take place at 5:45 p.m., but the threat of rain forced NASCAR to cancel qualifying. The field was set by first practice speeds. As a result, Kyle Larson earned the first starting spot. "I was glad we got a little track time there," Larson said. "I was quick off of the truck, which I was proud of the team for...I was able to lay down a real fast lap, went back to race trim and was fast there, too." Along with Travis Kvapil and Michael McDowell, Ryan Blaney and the Wood Brothers Racing team failed to qualify for the second week in a row. "We've gone a long time and not missed a race with weather," said co-owner Eddie Wood. "Now, the numbers seem to be leveling out. If you're slow and you miss a race because you're not fast enough, it's a bad deal. That kills your soul, but you can't do anything about the weather. We're gonna run next week at Loudon (N.H.), so we'll head up that way and hope we don't get rained out. I'm going to stop looking at weather apps, I can tell you that."

In his weekly appearance on the Sirius XM NASCAR Radio program The Morning Drive the Monday after the race, NASCAR Executive Vice-president and Chief Racing Officer Steve O'Donnell explained to Mike Bagley and Pete Pistone NASCAR's decision to cancel qualifying despite the final practice session being held at the time qualifying was scheduled to be held. He told them that NASCAR "could probably have done a better job of explaining it."

=== Starting lineup ===
Pos	No.	Driver	Team	Manufacturer	Time	Speed
1	42	Kyle Larson	Chip Ganassi Racing	Chevrolet	29.583	182.537
2	2	Brad Keselowski	Team Penske	Ford	29.729	181.641
3	24	Jeff Gordon	Hendrick Motorsports	Chevrolet	29.938	180.373
4	22	Joey Logano	Team Penske	Ford	29.983	180.102
5	78	Martin Truex Jr.	Furniture Row Racing	Chevrolet	30.007	179.958
6	48	Jimmie Johnson	Hendrick Motorsports	Chevrolet	30.035	179.790
7	1	Jamie McMurray	Chip Ganassi Racing	Chevrolet	30.044	179.736
8	11	Denny Hamlin	Joe Gibbs Racing	Toyota	30.073	179.563
9	18	Kyle Busch	Joe Gibbs Racing	Toyota	30.075	179.551
10	88	Dale Earnhardt Jr.	Hendrick Motorsports	Chevrolet	30.097	179.420
11	3	Austin Dillon	Richard Childress Racing	Chevrolet	30.143	179.146
12	43	Aric Almirola	Richard Petty Motorsports	Ford	30.167	179.004
13	41	Kurt Busch	Stewart–Haas Racing	Chevrolet	30.173	178.968
14	27	Paul Menard	Richard Childress Racing	Chevrolet	30.226	178.654
15	4	Kevin Harvick	Stewart–Haas Racing	Chevrolet	30.234	178.607
16	20	Matt Kenseth	Joe Gibbs Racing	Toyota	30.404	177.608
17	17	Ricky Stenhouse Jr.	Roush Fenway Racing	Ford	30.483	177.148
18	9	Sam Hornish Jr.	Richard Petty Motorsports	Ford	30.524	176.910
19	5	Kasey Kahne	Hendrick Motorsports	Chevrolet	30.530	176.875
20	19	Carl Edwards	Joe Gibbs Racing	Toyota	30.554	176.736
21	13	Casey Mears	Germain Racing	Chevrolet	30.584	176.563
22	14	Tony Stewart	Stewart–Haas Racing	Chevrolet	30.655	176.154
23	10	Danica Patrick	Stewart–Haas Racing	Chevrolet	30.668	176.079
24	47	A. J. Allmendinger	JTG Daugherty Racing	Chevrolet	30.679	176.016
25	55	David Ragan	Michael Waltrip Racing	Toyota	30.772	175.484
26	31	Ryan Newman	Richard Childress Racing	Chevrolet	30.777	175.456
27	16	Greg Biffle	Roush Fenway Racing	Ford	30.840	175.097
28	6	Trevor Bayne	Roush Fenway Racing	Ford	30.872	174.916
29	46	Michael Annett	HScott Motorsports	Chevrolet	30.908	174.712
30	15	Clint Bowyer	Michael Waltrip Racing	Toyota	30.921	174.639
31	7	Alex Bowman	Tommy Baldwin Racing	Chevrolet	30.921	174.639
32	51	Justin Allgaier	HScott Motorsports	Chevrolet	30.950	174.475
33	35	Cole Whitt	Front Row Motorsports	Ford	31.043	173.952
34	38	David Gilliland	Front Row Motorsports	Ford	31.139	173.416
35	26	Jeb Burton (R)	BK Racing	Toyota	31.142	173.399
36	40	Landon Cassill (i)	Hillman-Circle Sport LLC	Chevrolet	31.187	173.149
37	98	Josh Wise	Phil Parsons Racing	Ford	31.372	172.128
38	34	Brett Moffitt (R)	Front Row Motorsports	Ford	31.427	171.827
39	83	Matt DiBenedetto (R)	BK Racing	Toyota	31.450	171.701
40	32	Will Kimmel	Go FAS Racing	Ford	31.536	171.233
41	23	J. J. Yeley (i)	BK Racing	Toyota	31.711	170.288
42	62	Reed Sorenson	Premium Motorsports	Chevrolet	31.791	169.589
43	33	Alex Kennedy (R)	Hillman-Circle Sport LLC	Chevrolet	32.133	168.052
Failed to qualify
44	21	Ryan Blaney (i)	Wood Brothers Racing	Ford	30.352	177.912
45	95	Michael McDowell	Leavine Family Racing	Ford	31.046	173.935
46	30	Travis Kvapil (i)	The Motorsports Group	Chevrolet	31.462	171.636
Official first practice results
Official starting lineup

== Final practice ==
Kyle Larson was the fastest in the final practice session with a time of 30.267 and a speed of 178.412 mph (287.126 km/h).

Pos	No.	Driver	Team	Manufacturer	Time	Speed
1	42	Kyle Larson	Chip Ganassi Racing	Chevrolet	30.267	178.412
2	2	Brad Keselowski	Team Penske	Ford	30.316	178.124
3	22	Joey Logano	Team Penske	Ford	30.330	178.042
Official final practice results

== Race ==
=== First half ===
==== Start ====
The race was scheduled to start at 7:45 p.m. EDT but started two minutes later when Kyle Larson led the field to the green flag. He lost the lead to Brad Keselowski, who would lead the first lap. This would drop him to third place. The first caution of the race flew on lap 19 when J. J. Yeley, running on the outside, got loose and made contact with Josh Wise in turn 3, sending him into the wall. None of the leaders would pit under this caution, as they all stayed out.

The race restarted on lap 24. The second caution of the race flew on lap 31 as a scheduled competition caution. Kyle Busch exited pit road with the lead after taking both right-side tires while Keselowski took four.

The race restarted on lap 36. After 26 laps, Keselowski, who restarted in eleventh, drove his way up to second. Denny Hamlin was running eighth when he made an unscheduled stop on lap 72. The reason for this was a flat right-front tire. To add insult to injury, he was tagged for speeding on pit road and was forced to serve a drive-through penalty. He rejoined the race in 40th two laps down. Debris in turn 4 brought out the third caution of the race on lap 80.

==== Second quarter ====
The race restarted on lap 89. Keselowski put pressure on Kyle Busch on lap 93. Busch just edged him out for the lead by eight one-thousandths of a second. Finally, Keselowski passed him in turn 3 and took back the lead on lap 96. The fourth caution of the race flew on lap 99 for a single car spin on the front stretch. Exiting turn 4, Kurt Busch got loose and spun down the track, through the grass, and came to a stop a few yards from the start/finish line.

The race restarted on lap 105. The fifth caution of the race flew on lap 122 for a single car wreck in turn 4. Riding the high line, Yeley made contact with the wall. Kyle Busch exited pit road with the lead after taking right-side tires. Keselowski exited tenth after about hitting one of his tire carriers who tripped carrying one of his old tires.

The race restarted on lap 129. Justin Allgaier was tagged for passing before crossing the start/finish line and was forced to serve a drive-through penalty. The sixth caution of the race flew for a single car wreck in turn 3. Going into the turn, Dale Earnhardt Jr. blew out his left-front tire and rode the wall through 3 and 4.

=== Second half ===
==== Halfway ====
The race restarted on lap 141. The seventh caution of the race flew on lap 143 for a three car wreck in turn 2. While trying to avoid Tony Stewart going into turn 1, Ricky Stenhouse Jr. got loose, tapped Jeb Burton, and sent him spinning. Stenhouse also made contact with the wall.

The race restarted on lap 147. Debris in turn 4 brought out the eighth caution of the race. Keselowski gave up second to pit under caution.

The race restarted on lap 157. Debris in turn 2 brought out the ninth caution of the race on lap 187. Ryan Newman opted not to put under the caution and assumed the lead. Keselowski lost time on pit road following a malfunction with one of his crew's airguns. "Yeah. It's easy to play the Saturday evening quarterback, but it just didn't come together for us," Keselowski said. "There are certainly some things I could have done better and we didn't have the best day on pit road. It's something to build off of, but I thought Kyle and I both had pretty good cars and we just didn't put it all together when it counted. We'll keep working on it."

The race restarted on lap 192. On old tires, Newman stood little chance and lost the lead to Kyle Busch on lap 193. The tenth caution of the race flew with 61 laps to go for a single car spin in turn 3. Going into 3, Earnhardt Jr. bumped into the rear of Danica Patrick and sent her into the wall. She retaliated by cursing him on the radio and ramming him on pit road. He was perplexed at the situation. "I mean, what am I supposed to say other than the truth?" Earnhardt said. "We didn't have any brakes going into the corner. I know better than to run into her because it gets so much attention. There wasn't nothing I could do. I mean, as hard as I hit her, what the hell did she think I was doing? Trying to wreck her? We ain't got no problem. It's not like we were having a problem out on the racetrack with her. It's not like I just drew her name out of a hat and decided she was the one I was going to run into tonight." Denny Hamlin exited pit road with the lead.

==== Fourth quarter ====
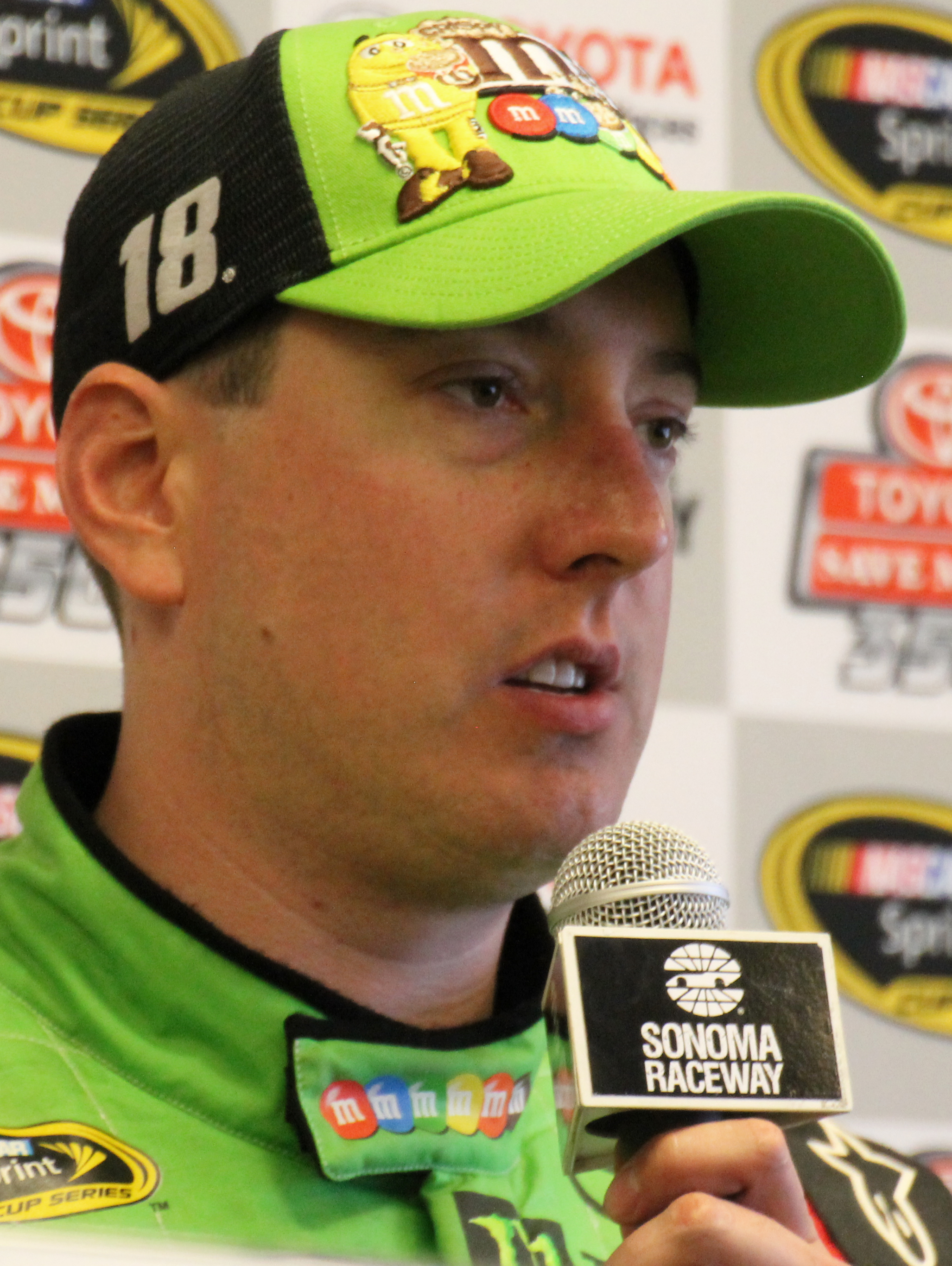
Kyle Busch, seen here at Sonoma Raceway, scored his 31st career victory at Kentucky Speedway.

The race restarted with 55 laps to go. Carl Edwards went three wide underneath his teammate to take the lead with 54 laps to go. He got loose in turn 1 and Hamlin took back the lead with 53 laps to go. Kyle Larson made an unscheduled stop for a tire rub with 51 laps to go. Kyle Busch took back the lead with 50 laps to go. The left-rear tire rub on Kyle Larson's car wasn't fixed. It went flat and sent the car into the wall in turn 1. This brought out the eleventh caution of the race with 48 laps to go. This also set a new track record for cautions in a Sprint Cup Series race.

The race restarted with 43 laps to go. Joey Logano shot past Hamlin on the restart and took the lead with 42 laps to go. After stalking and swapping positions for a few laps, Kyle Busch finally took the lead back from Logano with 18 laps to go. He drove away from Logano to score his 31st career victory.

== Post-race ==
=== Driver comments ===
"That right there is what we've got to do," Busch said. "Just to score as many points as we possibly can. To score those wins, that's what's going to get us to where we need to be. We led the most laps and we won the race, so that's all you can score. We'll just continue to push on and thrive." "Second just hurts, you know?" Logano said. "When you're that close to winning them, but we're still proud of what we did today. We had a fast car, we've improved our speed."

A number of drivers gave their thoughts on the success of the aero package. "They're close. The tire definitely could be a little softer. I wore one out just grinding on it, abusing it too much," said Denny Hamlin, who rallied from two laps down to finish third. "That's on me, but when you abuse a tire, you should not get rewarded for it. We've made our tires so dummy-proof over the last 10 years that anyone can just abuse them and abuse them with no consequence. I abused mine and I wore it out. That's what racing's all about. The drivers, our hands are uncuffed with this package. We're able to manhandle the cars and really be aggressive with it." Jeff Gordon, following his seventh-place finish in his final start at Kentucky Speedway, said that the tires aren't soft enough. "This is not the right tire," Gordon said. "It is still way too hard. It doesn't have near enough grip at the beginning of a run. It doesn't really fall off. The only way you can make a low-downforce package work is to have the proper tire on there. I'm glad we tried it, did a little more work, I'm looking forward to trying it again." "When the sun was out early when everybody's cars weren't dialed in yet, I mean that's the best racing we've had for a while, in my opinion," Carl Edwards said after finishing fourth. "It was when I started in this 10 or 12 years ago and it was really, really fun. Towards the end of the night, everybody got their cars working, the speeds picked up a little bit and you still got some of that spread-out, really hard to pass, but I'm telling you, this is the way we need to go. You let Goodyear, give them some time to build a tire for this, cut about half that spoiler off again, you're going to have some awesome racing."

=== Media reaction ===
"The first race with a new aerodynamic package featuring less down force provided plenty of reason for optimism. There appeared to be more passing for position mid-pack and drivers applauded the opportunity to race side-by-side and improve position. The battle between Kyle Busch and Joey Logano for the race lead and eventual win was as entertaining as anything seen all year. However, it's important to keep in mind this was simply the first step in creating an overall package for intermediate tracks. Goodyear will now have some time to produce a softer tire than what was used at Kentucky for the same rules package in place at Darlington on Labor Day weekend. While there was a race record 22 green flag passes for the lead once the lead car got in front many times they were able to check out. There's more work to be done but Saturday night was as good a first step as could be expected.

— Motor Racing Network lead writer and co-host of The Morning Drive on Sirius XM NASCAR Radio Pete Pistone giving his thoughts on the new aero package.

Members of the NASCAR media gave their thoughts on the first race with the new aero package. Pete Pistone, lead writer for the Motor Racing Network and co-host of the Sirius XM NASCAR Radio weekday program The Morning Drive, described the package as having "provided plenty of reason for optimism," that he saw "more passing for position mid-pack," and that the battle for the win between Kyle Busch and Joey Logano "was as entertaining as anything seen all year."

Jeff Gluck of USA Today said that "by every measurable category – including the eye test – the debut of NASCAR's low downforce rules package Saturday night at Kentucky Speedway was a whopping success," and that the package "sure kicked ass..."

Lee Spencer of Motorsport.com said that "while it's too early to grade the new low downforce Sprint Cup package, Saturday night's Quaker State 400 was one of the best shows NASCAR has put on at an intermediate track in a long, long time."

Nate Ryan of NBC Sports described it as "the best Sprint Cup race of a 2015 season lacking for the sort of indelible moments that ran on a continuous loop Saturday night at Kentucky Speedway," and that "there was enough compelling evidence for a strong case the package should get another shot beyond the Southern 500 at Darlington Raceway."

== Race results ==
Pos	No.	Driver	Team	Manufacturer	Laps	Points
1	18	Kyle Busch	Joe Gibbs Racing	Toyota	267	48
2	22	Joey Logano	Team Penske	Ford	267	43
3	11	Denny Hamlin	Joe Gibbs Racing	Toyota	267	42
4	19	Carl Edwards	Joe Gibbs Racing	Toyota	267	41
5	20	Matt Kenseth	Joe Gibbs Racing	Toyota	267	39
6	2	Brad Keselowski	Team Penske	Ford	267	39
7	24	Jeff Gordon	Hendrick Motorsports	Chevrolet	267	37
8	4	Kevin Harvick	Stewart–Haas Racing	Chevrolet	267	36
9	48	Jimmie Johnson	Hendrick Motorsports	Chevrolet	267	35
10	41	Kurt Busch	Stewart–Haas Racing	Chevrolet	267	34
11	17	Ricky Stenhouse Jr.	Roush Fenway Racing	Ford	267	33
12	43	Aric Almirola	Richard Petty Motorsports	Ford	267	32
13	6	Trevor Bayne	Roush Fenway Racing	Ford	267	31
14	1	Jamie McMurray	Chip Ganassi Racing	Chevrolet	267	30
15	27	Paul Menard	Richard Childress Racing	Chevrolet	267	29
16	16	Greg Biffle	Roush Fenway Racing	Ford	267	28
17	78	Martin Truex Jr.	Furniture Row Racing	Chevrolet	267	27
18	55	David Ragan	Michael Waltrip Racing	Toyota	267	26
19	15	Clint Bowyer	Michael Waltrip Racing	Toyota	267	25
20	31	Ryan Newman	Richard Childress Racing	Chevrolet	267	25
21	88	Dale Earnhardt Jr.	Hendrick Motorsports	Chevrolet	267	23
22	9	Sam Hornish Jr.	Richard Petty Motorsports	Ford	267	22
23	13	Casey Mears	Germain Racing	Chevrolet	267	21
24	51	Justin Allgaier	HScott Motorsports	Chevrolet	267	20
25	3	Austin Dillon	Richard Childress Racing	Chevrolet	267	19
26	47	A. J. Allmendinger	JTG Daugherty Racing	Chevrolet	267	18
27	5	Kasey Kahne	Hendrick Motorsports	Chevrolet	266	17
28	40	Landon Cassill (i)	Hillman-Circle Sport LLC	Chevrolet	266	0
29	38	David Gilliland	Front Row Motorsports	Ford	266	15
30	46	Michael Annett	HScott Motorsports	Chevrolet	266	14
31	7	Alex Bowman	Tommy Baldwin Racing	Chevrolet	266	14
32	34	Brett Moffitt (R)	Front Row Motorsports	Ford	266	12
33	14	Tony Stewart	Stewart–Haas Racing	Chevrolet	265	11
34	10	Danica Patrick	Stewart–Haas Racing	Chevrolet	265	10
35	42	Kyle Larson	Chip Ganassi Racing	Chevrolet	265	9
36	62	Reed Sorenson	Premium Motorsports	Chevrolet	264	9
37	35	Cole Whitt	Front Row Motorsports	Ford	264	7
38	32	Will Kimmel	Go FAS Racing	Ford	263	6
39	23	J. J. Yeley (i)	BK Racing	Toyota	260	0
40	33	Alex Kennedy (R)	Hillman-Circle Sport LLC	Chevrolet	247	4
41	26	Jeb Burton (R)	BK Racing	Toyota	175	3
42	83	Matt DiBenedetto (R)	BK Racing	Toyota	145	2
43	98	Josh Wise	Phil Parsons Racing	Ford	17	1
Official Quaker State 400 results

=== Race statistics ===
- 13 lead changes among 8 different drivers
- 11 cautions for 49 laps
- Time of race: 3 hours, 5 minutes, 42 seconds
- Average speed: 129.402 mph (208.252 km/h)
- Kyle Busch took home $214,316 in winnings

Lap Leaders
Laps	Leader
1-32	Brad Keselowski
33	Reed Sorenson
34-94	Kyle Busch
95-124	Brad Keselowski
125-188	Kyle Busch
189-190	Ryan Newman
191-208	Kyle Busch
209-210	Alex Bowman
211-212	Denny Hamlin
213	Carl Edwards
214-224	Denny Hamlin
225-247	Joey Logano
248-267	Kyle Busch

Total laps led
Leader	Laps
Kyle Busch	163
Brad Keselowski	62
Joey Logano	23
Denny Hamlin	13
Ryan Newman	2
Alex Bowman	2
Carl Edwards	1
Reed Sorenson	1

==== Race awards ====
- Coors Light Pole Award: None
- 3M Lap Leader: Kyle Busch (163 laps)
- American Ethanol Green Flag Restart Award: Kyle Busch
- Duralast Brakes "Bake In The Race" Award: Brad Keselowski
- Freescale "Wide Open": Matt Kenseth
- Ingersoll Rand Power Move: Ryan Newman (3 positions)
- MAHLE Clevite Engine Builder of the Race: Toyota Racing Development, #18
- Mobil 1 Driver of the Race: Kyle Busch (148.4 driver rating)
- Moog Steering and Suspension Problem Solver of The Race: Carl Edwards (crew chief Darian Grubb (0.302 seconds))
- NASCAR Sprint Cup Leader Bonus: No winner: rolls over to $150,000 at next event
- Sherwin-Williams Fastest Lap: Carl Edwards (Lap 148, 30.367, 177.825 mph (286.182 km/h))
- Sunoco Rookie of The Race: Brett Moffitt

== Media ==
=== Television ===
NBC Sports had the television call for the race. Rick Allen, Jeff Burton, and Steve Letarte had the call in the booth for the race. Dave Burns, Mike Massaro, Marty Snider, and Kelli Stavast handled pit road for the television side.

NBCSN
Booth announcers	Pit reporters
Lap-by-lap: Rick Allen; Color-commentator: Jeff Burton; Color-commentator: Steve Letarte	Dave Burns; Mike Massaro; Marty Snider; Kelli Stavast

=== Radio ===
PRN had the radio call for the race, which was simulcast on Sirius XM NASCAR Radio. Doug Rice, Mark Garrow, and Wendy Venturini called the race from the booth when the field went racing through the tri-oval. Rob Albright called the race from a billboard outside turn 1 when the field went racing through turns 1 & 2. Pat Patterson called the race from a billboard outside turn 4 when the field went racing through turns 3 & 4. Brad Gillie, Brett McMillan, Jim Noble, and Steve Richards worked pit road for the radio side.

PRN
Booth announcers	Turn announcers	Pit reporters
Lead announcer: Doug Rice; Announcer: Mark Garrow; Announcer: Wendy Venturini	Turns 1 & 2: Rob Albright; Turns 3 & 4: Pat Patterson	Brad Gillie; Brett McMillan; Jim Noble; Steve Richards

== Standings after the race ==
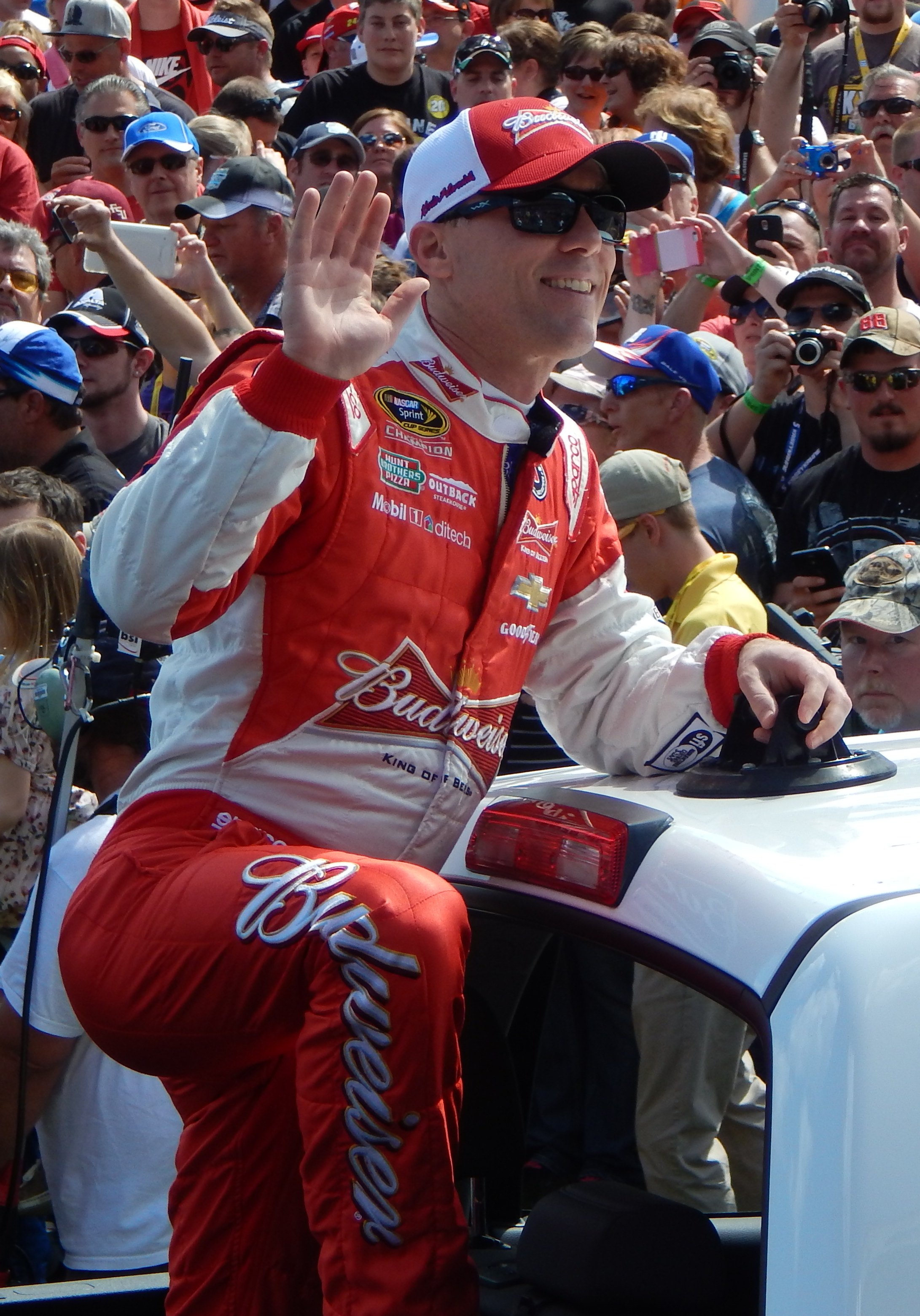
Kevin Harvick left Kentucky with a 68-point lead over Jimmie Johnson.

Drivers' Championship standings

	Pos	Driver	Points
	1	Kevin Harvick	792
1	2	Jimmie Johnson	724 (–68)
1	3	Joey Logano	724 (–68)
2	4	Dale Earnhardt Jr.	716 (–76)
	5	Martin Truex Jr.	696 (–96)
1	6	Brad Keselowski	599 (–133)
1	7	Jamie McMurray	596 (–136)
	8	Kurt Busch	542 (–150)
	9	Matt Kenseth	540 (–152)
	10	Jeff Gordon	537 (–155)
1	11	Denny Hamlin	522 (–170)
1	12	Kasey Kahne	513 (–179)
	13	Paul Menard	509 (–183)
	14	Ryan Newman	497 (–195)
	15	Clint Bowyer	490 (–202)
	16	Aric Almirola	473 (–219)

Manufacturers' Championship standings

Pos	Manufacturer	Points
1	Chevrolet	811
2	Ford	734 (–77)
3	Toyota	722 (–83)

- Note: Only the first sixteen positions are included for the driver standings.

== Notes ==
Previous race: 2015 Coke Zero 400	Sprint Cup Series; 2015 season	Next race: 2015 5-hour Energy 301
