= Iuppiter iratus ergo nefas =

The phrase "iuppiter iratus ergo nefas" is a proverb in Latin language that translates literally to "Jupiter is angry, therefore [he is] wrong." This proverb is not actually found in this form in any classical Latin texts. Despite that, it gained popularity, especially in Russia, where it appeared in the works of famous authors like Dostoevsky, Chekhov, and Pasternak as well as politicians like Lenin (also used by Russian-born Rosa Luxemburg). The maxim challenges an agitated person in a dispute, suggesting that their excess of emotions is caused by the lack of rational arguments.

== Origins ==
The origins of the adage are unclear, as the proverb cannot be found in the classical texts. Some authors attribute it to a satire by Lucian of Samosata, where Zeus, unable to convince Prometheus in a heated discussion, threatens him with a lightning bolt. Prometheus retorts, "You are using the thunderbolt instead of a reply, so you are wrong". However, this interpretation for Russian language can only be traced to Moritz Michelson (1904), who is short on the details, including the name of Lucian's work. Russian linguists Aschukin & Aschukina (1966) therefore suggest that the expression might have originated in some forgotten play of modern times.

Michelson also compares the proverb to "Never anger / Made good guard for itself" (Anthony and Cleopatra by Shakespeare) and French: Tu te fâches, tu as tort ("You're getting angry, you're wrong") that F. Antoine (1899) associates with Latin: irasceris; in te culpa est.

In France, d'Holbach (1770) also suggested Lucian as a source for tu as tort. In his version, Jupiter is arguing with Menippus: French: tu prens ton foudre? Tu as donc tort ("are you taking your thunderbolt? You're wrong then"). Few decades earlier, both Voltaire and Diderot were using the form "Tu prends ton tonnerre au lieu de répondre, dit Ménippe à Jupiter; tu as donc tort" ("You grab your thunder instead of answering," Menippus said to Jupiter; "so you are wrong"). Joseph-Victor Leclerc (1839) refers to Lucian, too, but suggests Prometheus as the Zeus' opponent. Konstantin Dushenko argues that the Russian expression had been borrowed from French in the second half of the 19th century.

Frederick the Great in 1764 used the variant French: Tu te fâches, tu dis des injures à ton prochain; tu as donc tort ("You get angry, you insult your neighbor; therefore you are wrong"). The commentator (most likely, Johann DE Preuss) referred to Lucian's Zeus Cross-Examined, chapter 15, where Cyniscus (a Cynic philosopher) supposedly says to Jupiter: French: Tu prends ton foudre, tu as donc tort ("You take your thunderbolt, therefore you are wrong"). The dialogue in the chapter 15 is actually Zeus saying, "why do I sit here listening to all this, with my thunder-bolt beneath my arm?" (Ancient Greek: καί μοι δοκεῖς εἰκότως μου καταφρονεῖν, ὅτε κεραυνόν, ὡς ὁρᾷς, διηγκυλημένος ἀνέχομαί σε τοσαῦτα καθ᾽ ἡμῶν διεξιόντα) and Cyniscus responding, "Nay, smite, if the thunder-bolt is my destiny" (Βάλλε, ὦ Ζεῦ, εἴ μοι. καὶ κεραυνῷ πληγῆναι εἵμαρται).

Dushenko suggests that the expression originated in another Lucian's work, "Tragic Zeus", where Zeus is angry with humans for doubting the existence of the gods and threatens to strike them with a thunderbolt, prompting a response from Hera, "A truce to your passion, Zeus".

== In Russian ==
Due to Russian version of the proverb (Юпитер, ты сердишься, значит, ты не прав) being well-known, it is frequently abbreviated to "Юпитер, ты сердишься" ("Jove, you are angry") or even to "кто сердится..." ("whoever is angry..."). These shortened references, coupled with near-total absence of the equivalents in other cultures, create significant problems for the translators:

In Act I of The Seagull, Arkadina has become upset with her son Kostya. This prompts Dorn, a family friend, to respond in this exchange:

Дорн. Юпитер, ты сердишься...
Аркадина. Я не Юпитер, а женщина.

Which can be literally translated:

Dorn: Jupiter, you're angry...
Arkadina: I'm not Jupiter, I'm a woman.

Wait... what?

— Justin Alexander

Michelson (1904) provides many more Russian variants in the works by Turgenev, Nikolai Leskov, Ivan Goncharov.

== Sources ==
- Alexander, Justin (2009). "Translation Notes: Jupiter is Angry".
- Antoine, F. (1899). "De la parataxe et de l'hypotaxe dans la langue latine" [On parataxis and hypotaxis in the Latin language]. Revue des Études Anciennes (in French). 1 (1): 27–46.
- Aschukin, Nikolai Sergeevitch; Aschukina, Maria Grigorievna (1966). "Юпитер" [Jupiter]. Крылатые слова: литературные цитаты, образные выражения [Catchphrases: literary quotes, figurative expressions] (in Russian). Khudozhestvennaya Literatura.
- Clerc, Joseph-Victor le (1839). Nouvelle rhétorique (in French). Société nationale.
- d'Holbach, Paul-Henri Thiry (1770). "Partie 2, Chapitre XI". Système de la nature (in French). Vol. 2. Londres. pp. 321–338. "Lucien suppose Jupiter qui, disputant avec Menippe, veut le foudroyer ; surquoi le philosophe lui dit, ah ! tu le fâches ; tu prens ton foudre ? Tu as donc tort."
- Diderot, Denis (1875). "Pensées philosophiques". In Assézat, Jules; Tourneux, Maurice (eds.). Œuvres complètes de Diderot (in French). Vol. 1. Paris: Garnier frères. pp. 127–155. "Tu prends ton tonnerre au lieu de répondre, dit Ménippe à Jupiter ; tu as donc tort ?"
- Dushenko, Konstantin (2004). "Юпитер, ты сердишься, значит, ты не прав.". Большой словарь цитат и крылатых выражений [Great dictionary of quotes and catchphrases] (in Russian).
- Frederick II, King of Prussia (1851). "Frédéric à la duchesse de Saxe-Gotha, (Potsdam), 18 mai 1764". In Preuss, Johann David Erdmann (ed.). Œuvres de Frédéric le Grand (in French). Vol. 18. Berlin: Imprimerie Royale (R. Decker).
- Lucian. "Zeus Cross-Examined (Jupiter Confutatus)". The Lucian of Samosata Project. Translated by Fowler, H. W.; Fowler, F. G.
- Lucian of Samosata (1905). "Zeus Tragoedus". The Works of Lucian of Samosata. Vol. 3. Translated by Fowler, Henry Watson; Fowler, Francis George. Oxford: Clarendon Press.
- Lucian (1913). "Juppiter confutatus". Poesia latina (in Ancient Greek).
- Luxemburg, Rosa (2023-08-08). The Complete Works of Rosa Luxemburg Volume IV: Political Writings 2, On Revolution (1906-1909). Verso Books. ISBN 978-1-80429-040-8.
- Michelson, Moritz Ilyich (1904). "Юпитер, ты сердишься: стало быть, ты виноват" [Jupiter, you are angry, thus you are at fault]. Русская мысль и речь: Своё и чужое: Опыт русской фразеологии: Сборник образных слов и иносказаний [Russian thought and Speech: Own and foreign: Experience of Russian phraseology. A Collection of Catchphrases and Aesopian expressions] (in Russian). Saint Peterburg: Imperial Academy of Science. Archived from the original on 10 August 2014.
- Pasternak, Boris (2010-11-23). Doctor Zhivago. Knopf Doubleday Publishing Group. ISBN 978-0-307-37996-2.
- Senelick, Laurence (2023-08-15). The Crooked Mirror: Plays from a Modernist Russian Cabaret. Northwestern University Press. ISBN 978-0-8101-4615-0.
- Serov, Vadim (2003). "Юпитер, ты сердишься, значит, ты не прав" [Jupiter, you are angry and therefore wrong]. Энциклопедический словарь крылатых слов и выражений [Encyclopedic dictionary of maxims and expressions] (in Russian). Локид-Пресс.
- Voltaire (1879). "Conseils à M. Racine sur son poëme de la Religion". Œuvres complètes de Voltaire (in French). Vol. 23. Paris: Garnier frères. p. 183. "Tu prends ton tonnerre au lieu de répondre, dit Ménippe à Jupiter ; tu as donc tort ?"
