= 2015 Quicken Loans 400 =

Race details
- Race 15 of 36 in the 2015 NASCAR Sprint Cup Series
- Layout of the track
- Date: June 14, 2015
- Location: Michigan International Speedway in Brooklyn, Michigan
- Course: Permanent racing facility
- Course length: 2 miles (3.219 km)
- Distance: 138 laps, 276 mi (444.179 km)
- Scheduled distance: 200 laps, 400 mi (643.738 km)
- Weather: Mostly cloudy with a temperature of 75 °F (24 °C); wind out of the southwest at 9 mph (14 km/h)
- Average speed: 116.688 mph (187.791 km/h)

Pole position
Driver	Kasey Kahne	Hendrick Motorsports
- Time: 35.645

Most laps led
Driver	Kevin Harvick	Stewart–Haas Racing
- Laps: 60

Winner
No. 41	Kurt Busch	Stewart–Haas Racing

Television in the United States
- Network: Fox Sports 1
- Announcers: Mike Joy, Larry McReynolds and Darrell Waltrip
- Nielsen ratings: 2.0/4 (Overnight); 2.3/5 (Final); 3.52 Million viewers

Radio in the United States
- Radio: MRN
- Booth announcers: Joe Moore, Jeff Striegle and Rusty Wallace
- Turn announcers: Dave Moody (1 & 2) and Mike Bagley (3 & 4)

The 2015 Quicken Loans 400 was a NASCAR Sprint Cup Series race held on June 14, 2015 at Michigan International Speedway in Brooklyn, Michigan. Contested over 138 of the scheduled 200 laps on the 2-mile (3.2-kilometre) D-shaped speedway, it was the 15th race of the 2015 NASCAR Sprint Cup Series season. Kurt Busch won the race, his second of the season, while Dale Earnhardt Jr. and Martin Truex Jr. finished second and third. Matt Kenseth and Joey Logano rounded out the top five.

Kasey Kahne won the pole for the race and led one lap on his way to a 15th-place finish. Kevin Harvick led a race high of 63 laps before a flat tire and rain relegated him to a 29th-place finish. The race had 17 lead changes among eleven different drivers, as well as five caution flag periods for 38 laps. There were three red flag periods for one hour, 33 minutes and 13 seconds.

This was the 27th career victory for Kurt Busch, third at Michigan International Speedway and first at the track for Stewart–Haas Racing. This win moved Busch to eleventh in the points standings. Chevrolet left Michigan with a 66-point lead over Ford in the manufacturer standings.

The Quicken Loans 400 was carried by Fox Sports on the cable/satellite Fox Sports 1 network for the American television audience. The radio broadcast for the race was carried by the Motor Racing Network and Sirius XM NASCAR Radio.

== Report ==
=== Background ===
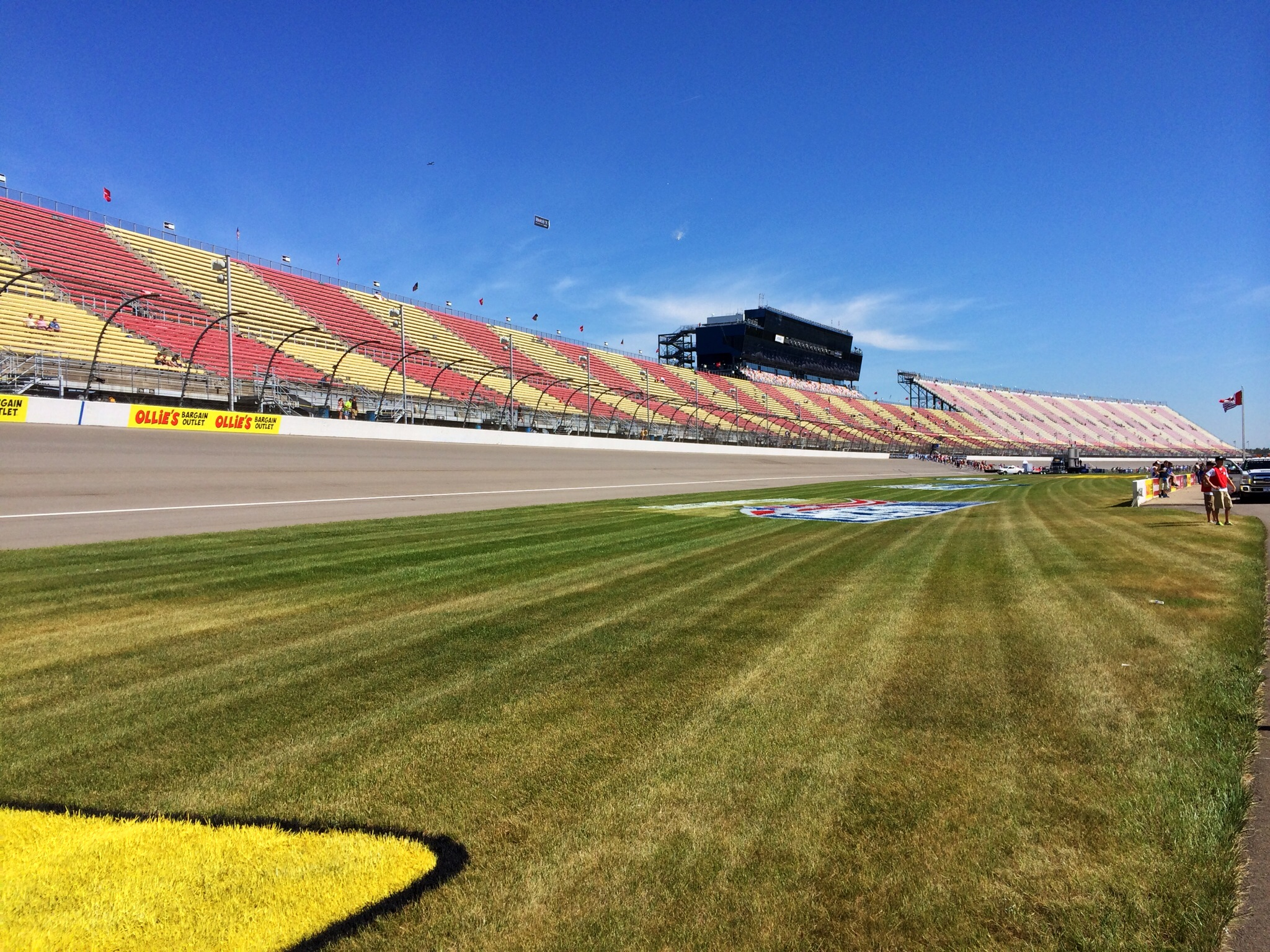
Michigan International Speedway, the track where the race was held.

Michigan International Speedway (MIS) is a two-mile (3.2-kilometre) moderate-banked D-shaped speedway located off U.S. Freeway 12 on more than 1,400 acres (5.7 km^{2}) approximately four-mile (6.4 km) south of the village of Brooklyn, in the scenic Irish Hills area of southeastern Michigan. The track is used primarily for NASCAR events. It is sometimes known as a "sister track" to Texas World Speedway, and was used as the basis of Auto Club Speedway. The track is owned by International Speedway Corporation (ISC). Michigan International Speedway is recognized as one of motorsports' premier facilities because of its wide racing surface and high banking (by open-wheel standards; the 18-degree banking is modest by stock car standards). Michigan is the fastest track in NASCAR due to its wide, sweeping corners and long straightaways; typical qualifying speeds are in excess of 200 mph (320 km/h) and corner entry speeds are anywhere from 215 to 220 mph (346 to 354 km/h) after the 2012 repaving of the track.

Kevin Harvick entered Michigan with a 39-point lead over Martin Truex Jr. following a runner-up finish at Pocono to Truex. Jimmie Johnson entered 78 back, Joey Logano entered 79 back and Dale Earnhardt Jr. entered 94 back.

==== Entry list ====
The entry list for the Quicken Loans 400 was released on Tuesday, June 9 at 9:09 a.m. Eastern time. Forty-four cars were entered for the race. All but the No. 21 Wood Brothers Racing Ford driven by Ryan Blaney were entered the week before at Pocono. The only driver swap for this race is the No. 32 Go FAS Racing Ford that was driven by Mike Bliss.

No.	Driver	Team	Manufacturer
1	Jamie McMurray	Chip Ganassi Racing	Chevrolet
2	Brad Keselowski (PC3)	Team Penske	Ford
3	Austin Dillon	Richard Childress Racing	Chevrolet
4	Kevin Harvick (PC1)	Stewart–Haas Racing	Chevrolet
5	Kasey Kahne	Hendrick Motorsports	Chevrolet
6	Trevor Bayne	Roush Fenway Racing	Ford
7	Alex Bowman	Tommy Baldwin Racing	Chevrolet
9	Sam Hornish Jr.	Richard Petty Motorsports	Ford
10	Danica Patrick	Stewart–Haas Racing	Chevrolet
11	Denny Hamlin	Joe Gibbs Racing	Toyota
13	Casey Mears	Germain Racing	Chevrolet
14	Tony Stewart (PC4)	Stewart–Haas Racing	Chevrolet
15	Clint Bowyer	Michael Waltrip Racing	Toyota
16	Greg Biffle	Roush Fenway Racing	Ford
17	Ricky Stenhouse Jr.	Roush Fenway Racing	Ford
18	Kyle Busch	Joe Gibbs Racing	Toyota
19	Carl Edwards	Joe Gibbs Racing	Toyota
20	Matt Kenseth (PC6)	Joe Gibbs Racing	Toyota
21	Ryan Blaney (i)	Wood Brothers Racing	Ford
22	Joey Logano	Team Penske	Ford
23	J. J. Yeley (i)	BK Racing	Toyota
24	Jeff Gordon (PC7)	Hendrick Motorsports	Chevrolet
26	Jeb Burton (R)	BK Racing	Toyota
27	Paul Menard	Richard Childress Racing	Chevrolet
31	Ryan Newman	Richard Childress Racing	Chevrolet
32	Mike Bliss (i)	Go FAS Racing	Ford
33	Ty Dillon (i)	Hillman-Circle Sport LLC	Chevrolet
34	Brett Moffitt (R)	Front Row Motorsports	Ford
35	Cole Whitt	Front Row Motorsports	Ford
38	David Gilliland	Front Row Motorsports	Ford
40	Landon Cassill (i)	Hillman-Circle Sport LLC	Chevrolet
41	Kurt Busch (PC5)	Stewart–Haas Racing	Chevrolet
42	Kyle Larson	Chip Ganassi Racing	Chevrolet
43	Aric Almirola	Richard Petty Motorsports	Ford
46	Michael Annett	HScott Motorsports	Chevrolet
47	A. J. Allmendinger	JTG Daugherty Racing	Chevrolet
48	Jimmie Johnson (PC2)	Hendrick Motorsports	Chevrolet
51	Justin Allgaier	HScott Motorsports	Chevrolet
55	David Ragan	Michael Waltrip Racing	Toyota
62	Brendan Gaughan (i)	Premium Motorsports	Chevrolet
78	Martin Truex Jr.	Furniture Row Racing	Chevrolet
83	Matt DiBenedetto (R)	BK Racing	Toyota
88	Dale Earnhardt Jr.	Hendrick Motorsports	Chevrolet
98	Josh Wise	Phil Parsons Racing	Ford
Official entry list

Key	Meaning
(R)	Rookie
(i)	Ineligible for points
(PC#)	Past champions provisional

== First practice ==
Kevin Harvick was the fastest in the first practice session with a time of 35.557 and a speed of 202.492 mph (325.879 km/h). His teammate Kurt Busch slapped the wall exiting turn 2 with 30 minutes remaining in the session and switched to his backup car. "Went down in there and was a little twitchier when it turned in and then it went full on left," Busch radioed to his team after the hit. "Sorry ... it's pretty much ruined." Because this change took place prior to qualifying, he was not required to start the race from the rear of the field. The session was shortened due to rain.

Pos	No.	Driver	Team	Manufacturer	Time	Speed
1	4	Kevin Harvick	Stewart–Haas Racing	Chevrolet	35.557	202.492
2	22	Joey Logano	Team Penske	Ford	35.713	201.607
3	78	Martin Truex Jr.	Furniture Row Racing	Chevrolet	35.793	201.157
Official first practice results

== Qualifying ==
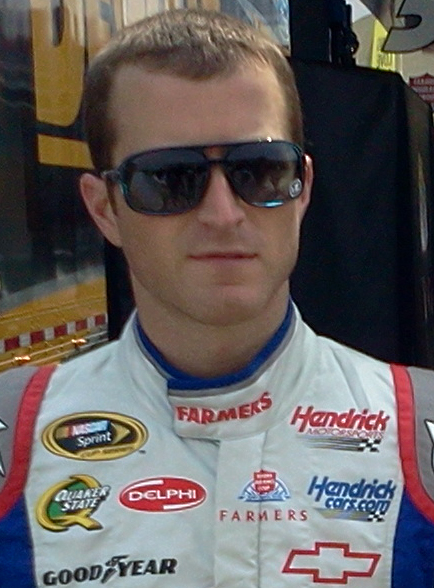
Kasey Kahne, seen here in 2012, scored the pole for the race.

Kasey Kahne won the pole with a time of 35.645 and a speed of 201.992 mph (325.075 km/h). “Our Great Clips Chevrolet has had speed all three runs, so I knew we’d have a shot today, so that was cool,” Kahne said. “It’s been a while since we’ve had a pole. It’s going to be really important. The track is going to change a lot, though, come Sunday, with all the racing going on this weekend and then our practices tomorrow. The track will be a lot different Sunday. So, there will be some passing for sure, but it’s not going to be easy. So, track position will play a big role in being there at the end of the race.” "Kasey [Kahne] put up a little better lap than I did, but it was still a solid run," Kevin Harvick said after qualifying second. “It was a good lap,” said Brad Keselowski after qualifying third. “This is one of our weakness tracks here at Michigan International Speedway. We are working on it and trying to get better. I honestly didn’t think we would qualify this well. We came with some new stuff on the car, which seems to be working. I am proud of everyone at Team Penske, Ford and Roush Yates engines for that.” Brendan Gaughan was the lone driver who failed to qualify for the race. Ryan Blaney qualified fifth for the race. “It's really all you can ask for to be better and better in the three rounds,” Blaney said of the team's qualifying effort. “Everyone did a great job. (Crew chief) Jeremy (Bullins) did a great job of getting us better. It was a good effort for us. We needed it. We're excited about Sunday."

=== Qualifying results ===
Pos	No.	Driver	Team	Manufacturer	R1	R2	R3
1	5	Kasey Kahne	Hendrick Motorsports	Chevrolet	35.909	35.703	35.645
2	4	Kevin Harvick	Stewart–Haas Racing	Chevrolet	35.748	35.645	35.712
3	2	Brad Keselowski	Team Penske	Ford	36.205	35.845	35.741
4	19	Carl Edwards	Joe Gibbs Racing	Toyota	36.064	35.812	35.809
5	21	Ryan Blaney (i)	Wood Brothers Racing	Ford	36.084	35.872	35.811
6	24	Jeff Gordon	Hendrick Motorsports	Chevrolet	36.526	35.799	35.823
7	3	Austin Dillon	Richard Childress Racing	Chevrolet	36.213	36.003	35.836
8	48	Jimmie Johnson	Hendrick Motorsports	Chevrolet	36.120	35.935	35.882
9	78	Martin Truex Jr.	Furniture Row Racing	Chevrolet	36.370	35.980	35.896
10	18	Kyle Busch	Joe Gibbs Racing	Toyota	36.537	35.839	35.916
11	22	Joey Logano	Team Penske	Ford	36.057	35.850	35.925
12	20	Matt Kenseth	Joe Gibbs Racing	Toyota	36.207	35.929	36.076
13	11	Denny Hamlin	Joe Gibbs Racing	Toyota	35.965	36.012	—
14	88	Dale Earnhardt Jr.	Hendrick Motorsports	Chevrolet	36.252	36.013	—
15	14	Tony Stewart	Stewart–Haas Racing	Chevrolet	36.092	36.061	—
16	42	Kyle Larson	Chip Ganassi Racing	Chevrolet	36.388	36.102	—
17	27	Paul Menard	Richard Childress Racing	Chevrolet	36.343	36.117	—
18	55	David Ragan	Michael Waltrip Racing	Toyota	36.337	36.184	—
19	10	Danica Patrick	Stewart–Haas Racing	Chevrolet	36.550	36.279	—
20	6	Trevor Bayne	Roush Fenway Racing	Ford	36.586	36.294	—
21	16	Greg Biffle	Roush Fenway Racing	Ford	36.544	36.324	—
22	33	Ty Dillon (i)	Hillman-Circle Sport LLC	Chevrolet	36.526	36.330	—
23	31	Ryan Newman	Richard Childress Racing	Chevrolet	36.343	36.340	—
24	41	Kurt Busch	Stewart–Haas Racing	Chevrolet	36.287	36.440	—
25	1	Jamie McMurray	Chip Ganassi Racing	Chevrolet	36.599	—	—
26	43	Aric Almirola	Richard Petty Motorsports	Ford	36.605	—	—
27	13	Casey Mears	Germain Racing	Ford	36.630	—	—
28	7	Alex Bowman	Tommy Baldwin Racing	Chevrolet	36.657	—	—
29	40	Landon Cassill (i)	Hillman-Circle Sport LLC	Chevrolet	36.660	—	—
30	9	Sam Hornish Jr.	Richard Petty Motorsports	Ford	36.788	—	—
31	47	A. J. Allmendinger	JTG Daugherty Racing	Chevrolet	36.812	—	—
32	15	Clint Bowyer	Michael Waltrip Racing	Toyota	36.814	—	—
33	17	Ricky Stenhouse Jr.	Roush Fenway Racing	Ford	36.814	—	—
34	38	David Gilliland	Front Row Motorsports	Ford	36.831	—	—
35	46	Michael Annett	HScott Motorsports	Chevrolet	36.984	—	—
36	51	Justin Allgaier	HScott Motorsports	Chevrolet	37.104	—	—
37	34	Brett Moffitt (R)	Front Row Motorsports	Ford	37.195	—	—
38	26	Jeb Burton (R) (Note: Jeb Burton changed engines after final practice and started the race from the rear of the field.)	BK Racing	Toyota	37.202	—	—
39	98	Josh Wise	Phil Parsons Racing	Ford	37.331	—	—
40	35	Cole Whitt	Front Row Motorsports	Ford	37.333	—	—
41	23	J. J. Yeley (i)	BK Racing	Toyota	37.654	—	—
42	32	Mike Bliss (i)	Go FAS Racing	Ford	37.797	—	—
43	83	Matt DiBenedetto (R)	BK Racing	Toyota	37.973	—	—
Failed to qualify
44	62	Brendan Gaughan (i)	Premium Motorsports	Chevrolet	38.431	—	—
Official qualifying results

== Practice (post-qualifying) ==
=== Second practice ===
Kevin Harvick was the fastest in the second practice session with a time of 35.806 and a speed of 201.084 mph (323.613 km/h).

Pos	No.	Driver	Team	Manufacturer	Time	Speed
1	4	Kevin Harvick	Stewart–Haas Racing	Chevrolet	35.806	201.084
2	5	Kasey Kahne	Hendrick Motorsports	Chevrolet	35.928	200.401
3	42	Kyle Larson	Chip Ganassi Racing	Chevrolet	36.002	199.989
Official second practice results

=== Final practice ===
Jeff Gordon was the fastest in the final practice session with a time of 36.253 and a speed of 198.604 mph (319.622 km/h). Halfway through the session, Denny Hamlin spun out on the front stretch and caused minor damage to the front splitter. The team initially decided to roll out the backup car, but chose to fix the primary car rather than starting from the rear of the race.

Pos	No.	Driver	Team	Manufacturer	Time	Speed
1	24	Jeff Gordon	Hendrick Motorsports	Chevrolet	36.253	198.604
2	18	Kyle Busch	Joe Gibbs Racing	Toyota	36.259	198.571
3	78	Martin Truex Jr.	Furniture Row Racing	Chevrolet	36.259	198.571
Official final practice results

== Race ==
=== First half ===
==== Start and rain delays ====
The race was scheduled to start at 1:16 p.m., but the threat of thunderstorms prompted NASCAR to move the start time up ten minutes. Eventually, the race started eight minutes after one. Kasey Kahne led the field to the green flag, but lost the lead to Carl Edwards on the first lap. He passed him to lead the second lap. Edwards went by him again to lead the third lap. The first caution of the race flew on lap 11 for rain in turns 1 and 2. The race was red flagged on lap 13 for rain. After 59 minutes, the red flag was lifted and the field was moved off pit road. After two laps under caution, rain began to fall again in turn 1. The rain started coming down harder all around the track and the field was brought back down pit road again. The race was red flagged a second time on lap 19. It was lifted after 34 minutes.

The race was set to restart on lap 25, but it was called off after Alex Bowman – who made contact with the wall early in the race – left debris on the backstretch. Eventually, the race restarted on lap 29. The second caution of the race flew on lap 41. It was a scheduled competition caution due to overnight rain. Josh Wise opted not to pit and took the lead. He drove down pit road the next lap and handed the lead to Kevin Harvick. Just as the field was lining up for the restart on lap 44, rain began to pour a third time. The field was brought back down pit road and the race was red flagged for the third time. After 36 minutes, the red flag was lifted and the field rolled off pit road.

==== Second quarter ====
The race restarted on lap 52. The third caution of the race flew on lap 53 for a single car wreck on the front stretch. Exiting turn 4, Kyle Busch's car snapped loose, turned up the track and pounded the wall. The SAFER barrier he hit was damaged and required repair.

The race restarted on lap 60. A number of cars began hitting pit road around lap 77. Kevin Harvick surrendered the lead to pit on lap 83 and handed the lead to Matt Kenseth. He pitted on lap 85 and handed the lead to Brad Keselowski. He ducked onto pit road the next lap and gave the lead to Kyle Larson. He pitted on lap 88 and handed the lead to Joey Logano. He ran out of fuel on lap 95 and hit pit road. This gave the lead to Danica Patrick. She pitted on lap 97 and the lead cycled back to teammate Harvick.

=== Second half ===
==== Halfway ====
Harvick gave up the lead to pit on lap 121 and handed it to Dale Earnhardt Jr. He pitted the next lap and it went to Kenseth. He pitted the next lap and handed it to Keselowski. Harvick stopped a second time for a flat right-front tire. Debris in turn 3 brought out the fourth caution of the race on lap 125. That debris came from Harvick's car. Edwards opted not to pit and assumed the lead with rain just three miles out. The gamble failed and he pitted before the restart.

==== Finish ====
Kyle Larson led the field to the restart on lap 130. He too failed on his gamble, pitted for gas three laps later and gave the lead to Kurt Busch. “Yeah, we could see weather coming there off of (Turn) 4 and just praying that it would get here in time for me to stay out and be in the lead when the rain did hit,” Larson said. “Hey, I applaud my guys for trying. We are pretty deep in points so we have to take risks like that to make the Chase. I’m happy with the call, just wish the rain would have come three laps sooner.” The fifth caution of the race flew with 64 laps to go for rain. The field was brought down pit road and the race was red flagged for the fourth time with 62 laps to go. Eventually, NASCAR called the race due to darkness being near and no sign of the weather letting up and Kurt Busch scored his 27th career win and third at Michigan, similar to the rain-shortened Coke Zero 400 last year when Aric Almirola scored his first career win at Daytona.

== Post-race ==
=== Post-race comments ===
“We’ve got some indicators around lighting, when it gets within a certain mileage we have to work with the track and the track is going to evacuate the grandstands. Even when the sun was shining, it was still raining at 6:30 but post that when the sun came out, there was still lightning in the area, it would have been really challenging to have put fans in that circumstance. We judge it on how much time do we have left – daylight – you don’t have lights in Michigan, and more importantly, what does the weather look like. It takes longer to dry a track as you get later in the afternoon. Once we had to evacuate the grandstands ... that put us in a really challenging situation. The fans had stuck it out for a long time and then when you looked at the radar and the possibility of continued lightning and rain, we thought it was the most prudent decision to make at that time to call it a day.’’

— NASCAR Executive Vice-President Steve O'Donnell speaking on Sirius XM NASCAR Radio.

“(Crew chief) Tony Gibson led these guys through a back-up car, the pit crew was there giving it its best,” Kurt Busch said. “It’s an unbelievable feeling to know what we went through, paced ourselves and found the lead towards the latter part of the race and then the rain came in.” “Yeah, I mean, you just had to wait on the weather to get moved out, wait on them to dry the track,” Earnhardt Jr. said after finishing second. “You know, it didn't give you a whole lot of opportunities to understand your car and know exactly how to adjust your car and what to work on, so we were still dealing with some issues that we wanted to improve when the final shower came.” “We were able to use the strategy to our benefit and come out of here with a top-10 effort and that feels great for this team,” Trevor Bayne said of his season-best finish of ninth. “We have been working hard to get up better results all season and to get this ninth place finish today is a confidence and momentum builder.”

In his weekly Monday appearance on the Sirius XM NASCAR Radio program The Morning Drive, NASCAR Executive Vice-President and Chief Racing Officer Steve O'Donnell explained to Mike Bagley and Pete Pistone the process and reasoning to why the race was called before its scheduled conclusion.

== Race results ==
Pos	No.	Driver	Team	Manufacturer	Laps	Points
1	41	Kurt Busch	Stewart–Haas Racing	Chevrolet	138	47
2	88	Dale Earnhardt Jr.	Hendrick Motorsports	Chevrolet	138	43
3	78	Martin Truex Jr.	Furniture Row Racing	Chevrolet	138	41
4	20	Matt Kenseth	Joe Gibbs Racing	Toyota	138	41
5	22	Joey Logano	Team Penske	Ford	138	40
6	2	Brad Keselowski	Team Penske	Ford	138	39
7	1	Jamie McMurray	Chip Ganassi Racing	Chevrolet	138	37
8	27	Paul Menard	Richard Childress Racing	Chevrolet	138	36
9	6	Trevor Bayne	Roush Fenway Racing	Ford	138	35
10	15	Clint Bowyer	Michael Waltrip Racing	Toyota	138	34
11	11	Denny Hamlin	Joe Gibbs Racing	Toyota	138	33
12	19	Carl Edwards	Joe Gibbs Racing	Toyota	138	33
13	13	Casey Mears	Germain Racing	Chevrolet	138	31
14	33	Ty Dillon (i)	Hillman-Circle Sport LLC	Chevrolet	138	0
15	5	Kasey Kahne	Hendrick Motorsports	Chevrolet	138	30
16	10	Danica Patrick	Stewart–Haas Racing	Chevrolet	138	29
17	42	Kyle Larson	Chip Ganassi Racing	Chevrolet	138	28
18	31	Ryan Newman	Richard Childress Racing	Chevrolet	138	26
19	48	Jimmie Johnson	Hendrick Motorsports	Chevrolet	137	25
20	3	Austin Dillon	Richard Childress Racing	Chevrolet	137	24
21	24	Jeff Gordon	Hendrick Motorsports	Chevrolet	137	23
22	43	Aric Almirola	Richard Petty Motorsports	Ford	137	22
23	47	A. J. Allmendinger	JTG Daugherty Racing	Chevrolet	137	21
24	21	Ryan Blaney (i)	Wood Brothers Racing	Ford	137	0
25	17	Ricky Stenhouse Jr.	Roush Fenway Racing	Ford	137	19
26	9	Sam Hornish Jr.	Richard Petty Motorsports	Ford	137	18
27	51	Justin Allgaier	HScott Motorsports	Chevrolet	137	17
28	14	Tony Stewart	Stewart–Haas Racing	Chevrolet	137	16
29	4	Kevin Harvick	Stewart–Haas Racing	Chevrolet	137	17
30	46	Michael Annett	HScott Motorsports	Chevrolet	137	14
31	40	Landon Cassill (i)	Hillman-Circle Sport LLC	Chevrolet	137	0
32	35	Cole Whitt	Front Row Motorsports	Ford	137	12
33	34	Brett Moffitt (R)	Front Row Motorsports	Ford	137	11
34	98	Josh Wise	Phil Parsons Racing	Ford	137	11
35	55	David Ragan	Michael Waltrip Racing	Toyota	136	9
36	16	Greg Biffle	Roush Fenway Racing	Ford	136	8
37	26	Jeb Burton (R)	BK Racing	Toyota	136	7
38	23	J. J. Yeley (i)	BK Racing	Toyota	136	0
39	83	Matt DiBenedetto (R)	BK Racing	Toyota	136	5
40	32	Mike Bliss (i)	Go FAS Racing	Ford	136	0
41	7	Alex Bowman	Tommy Baldwin Racing	Chevrolet	84	3
42	38	David Gilliland	Front Row Motorsports	Ford	64	2
43	18	Kyle Busch	Joe Gibbs Racing	Toyota	52	1
Official Quicken Loans 400 results

=== Race statistics ===
- 17 lead changes among 11 different drivers
- 5 cautions for 38 laps; 3 red flags for 1 hour, 33 minutes, 22 seconds
- Time of race: 2 hours, 21 minutes, 55 seconds
- Average speed: 116.688 mph (187.791 km/h)
- Kurt Busch took home $186,725 in winnings

Lap Leaders
Laps	Leader
1	Carl Edwards
2	Kasey Kahne
3-41	Carl Edwards
42	Josh Wise
43-82	Kevin Harvick
83-84	Matt Kenseth
85	Brad Keselowski
86-87	Kyle Larson
88-94	Joey Logano
95-96	Danica Patrick
97-119	Kevin Harvick
120	Dale Earnhardt Jr.
121	Matt Kenseth
122-126	Brad Keselowski
127	Carl Edwards
128-132	Kyle Larson
133-138	Kurt Busch

Total laps led
Leader	Laps
Kevin Harvick	63
Carl Edwards	41
Joey Logano	7
Kyle Larson	7
Kurt Busch	6
Brad Keselowski	6
Matt Kenseth	3
Danica Patrick	2
Dale Earnhardt Jr.	1
Kasey Kahne	1
Josh Wise	1

==== Race awards ====
- Coors Light Pole Award: Kasey Kahne (35.645, 201.992 mph (325.075 km/h))
- 3M Lap Leader: Kevin Harvick (63 laps)
- American Ethanol Green Flag Restart Award: Carl Edwards
- Duralast Brakes "Bake In The Race" Award: Carl Edwards
- Freescale "Wide Open": Kurt Busch
- Ingersoll Rand Power Move: Jamie McMurray (11 positions)
- MAHLE Clevite Engine Builder of the Race: Hendrick Engines, #41
- Mobil 1 Driver of the Race: Matt Kenseth (117.6 driver rating)
- Moog Steering and Suspension Problem Solver of The Race: Paul Menard (crew chief Justin Alexander (0.260))
- NASCAR Sprint Cup Leader Bonus: No winner: rolls over to $120,000 at next event
- Sherwin-Williams Fastest Lap: Carl Edwards (Lap 30, 36.649, 196.457 mph (316.167 km/h))
- Sunoco Rookie of The Race: Brett Moffitt

== Media ==
=== Television ===
Fox Sports covered their seventh race at Michigan International Speedway and their first since 2006. Mike Joy, Larry McReynolds and two time Michigan winner Darrell Waltrip had the booth to call the race. Jamie Little, Chris Neville and Matt Yocum handled the pit road duties for the television side.

Fox Sports 1
Booth announcers	Pit reporters
Lap-by-lap: Mike Joy; Color-commentator: Larry McReynolds; Color-commentator: Darrell Waltrip	Jamie Little; Chris Neville; Matt Yocum

=== Radio ===
MRN had the radio call for the race, which was simulcast on Sirius XM NASCAR Radio. Joe Moore, Jeff Striegle and five time Michigan winner Rusty Wallace called the race in the booth when the field was racing down the front stretch. Dave Moody called the race from atop a billboard outside of turn 2 when the field was racing through turns 1 and 2. Mike Bagley called the race from a platform outside turn 4 when the field was racing through turns 3 and 4. Alex Hayden, Winston Kelley and Steve Post worked pit road for MRN.

MRN
Booth announcers	Turn announcers	Pit reporters
Lead announcer: Joe Moore; Announcer: Jeff Striegle; Announcer: Rusty Wallace	Turns 1 & 2: Dave Moody; Turn 3 & 4: Mike Bagley	Alex Hayden; Winston Kelley; Steve Post

== Standings after the race ==
Drivers' Championship standings

	Pos	Driver	Points
	1	Kevin Harvick	576
	2	Martin Truex Jr.	561 (-15)
1	3	Joey Logano	520 (-56)
1	4	Dale Earnhardt Jr.	508 (-68)
2	5	Jimmie Johnson	506 (-70)
	6	Brad Keselowski	480 (-96)
	7	Jamie McMurray	464 (-112)
1	8	Matt Kenseth	456 (-120)
1	9	Kasey Kahne	447 (-129)
	10	Jeff Gordon	434 (-142)
1	11	Kurt Busch	426 (-150)
1	12	Paul Menard	421 (-155)
	13	Denny Hamlin	412 (-164)
2	14	Carl Edwards	401 (-175)
1	15	Aric Almirola	401 (-175)
1	16	Ryan Newman	400 (-176)

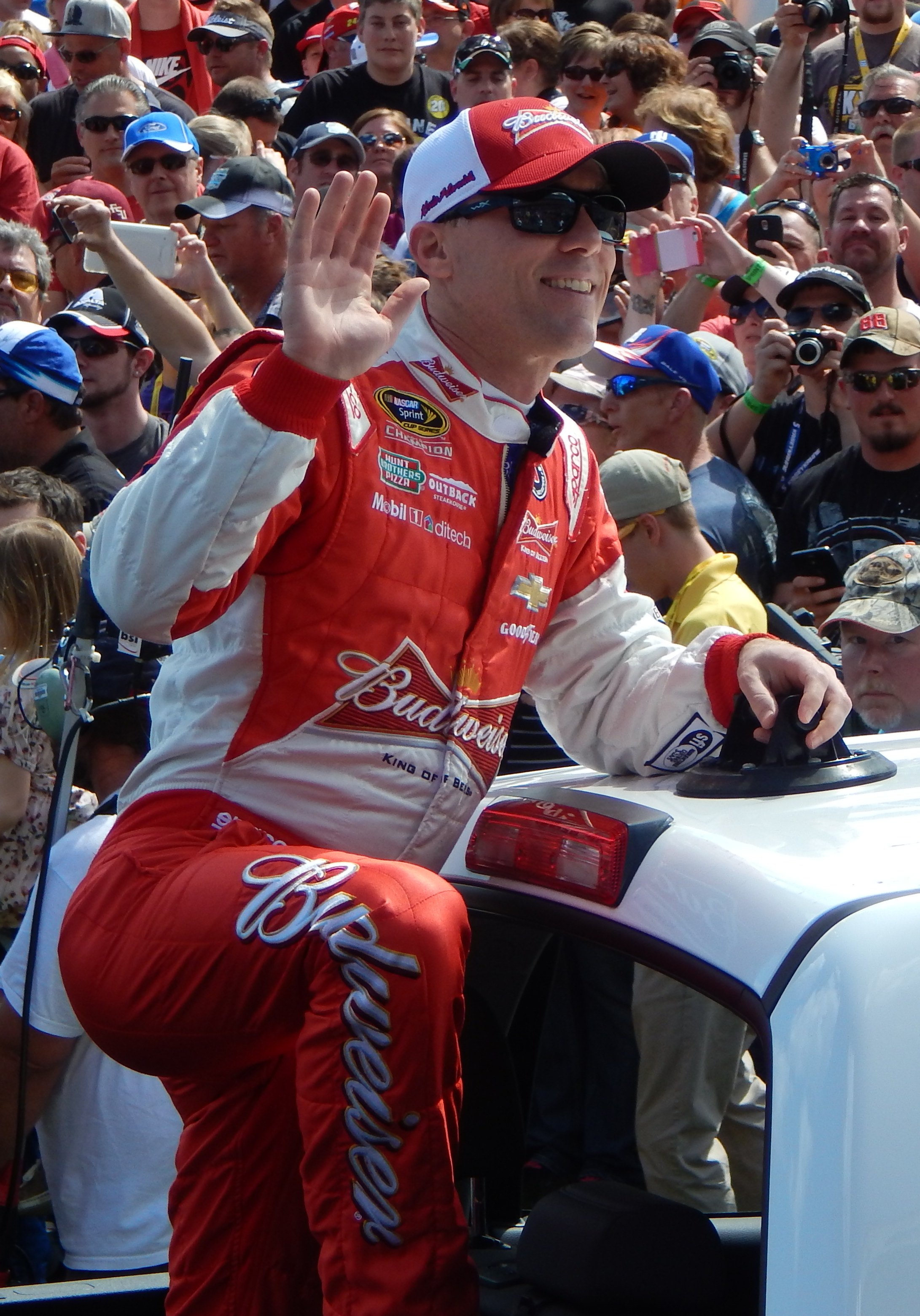
Kevin Harvick left Michigan with a 15-point lead over Martin Truex Jr.

Manufacturers' Championship standings

Pos	Manufacturer	Points
1	Chevrolet	683
2	Ford	617 (-66)
3	Toyota	585 (-98)

- Note: Only the first sixteen positions are included for the driver standings.

== Note ==
Previous race: 2015 Axalta "We Paint Winners" 400	Sprint Cup Series; 2015 season	Next race: 2015 Toyota/Save Mart 350
