= Dushenko =

Dushenko is a Ukrainian surname. Notable people with the surname include:

- Chrisi Karvonides-Dushenko, American costume designer
- Konstantin Dushenko (born 1946), Russian translator, culturologist, and historian
