= 2015 Auto Club 400 =

Race details
- Race 5 of 36 in the 2015 NASCAR Sprint Cup Series
- Date: March 22, 2015
- Location: Auto Club Speedway in Fontana, California
- Course: Permanent racing facility
- Course length: 2 miles (3.219 km)
- Distance: 209 laps, 418 mi (672.706 km)
- Scheduled distance: 200 laps, 400 mi (643.738 km)
- Weather: Partly cloudy with a temperature of 70 °F (21 °C); wind out of the west/southwest at 8 mph (13 km/h)
- Average speed: 140.662 mph (226.374 km/h)

Pole position
| Driver | Kurt Busch | Stewart–Haas Racing |
- Time: 38.889

Most laps led
| Driver | Kurt Busch | Stewart–Haas Racing |
- Laps: 65

Winner
| No. 2 | Brad Keselowski | Team Penske |

Television in the United States
- Network: Fox
- Announcers: Mike Joy, Larry McReynolds and Darrell Waltrip
- Nielsen ratings: 4.0/9 (Overnight); 4.3/10 (Final); 7.3 Million viewers

Radio in the United States
- Radio: MRN
- Booth announcers: Joe Moore and Jeff Striegle
- Turn announcers: Dan Hubbard (1 & 2) and Kyle Rickey (3 & 4)

The 2015 Auto Club 400 was a NASCAR Sprint Cup Series race held on March 22, 2015, at Auto Club Speedway in Fontana, California. Contested over 209 laps – extended from 200 laps, due to a green–white–checker finish – on the 2-mile (3.2-kilometre) D-shaped oval, it was the fifth race of the 2015 NASCAR Sprint Cup Series season. Brad Keselowski won the race – his 17th career victory – while Kevin Harvick extended his top two finish streak to eight races with a runner-up finish. Kurt Busch, Paul Menard and Ryan Newman rounded out the top five.

Busch won the pole for the race and led a race high of 65 laps; he lost the lead on the final lap and was passed by Keselowski and Harvick. The race had 19 lead changes among nine different drivers, as well as seven caution flag periods for 31 laps. Recording Team Penske's second NASCAR win at the track, Keselowski moved into fifth place in the points standings, which were led by Harvick; he left Fontana with a 28-point lead over Joey Logano. Chevrolet left with a 16-point lead over Ford in the manufacturers' standings.

The Auto Club 400 was carried by Fox Sports on the broadcast Fox network for the American television audience. The radio broadcast of the race was carried by the Motor Racing Network and Sirius XM NASCAR Radio.

== Report ==
=== Background ===
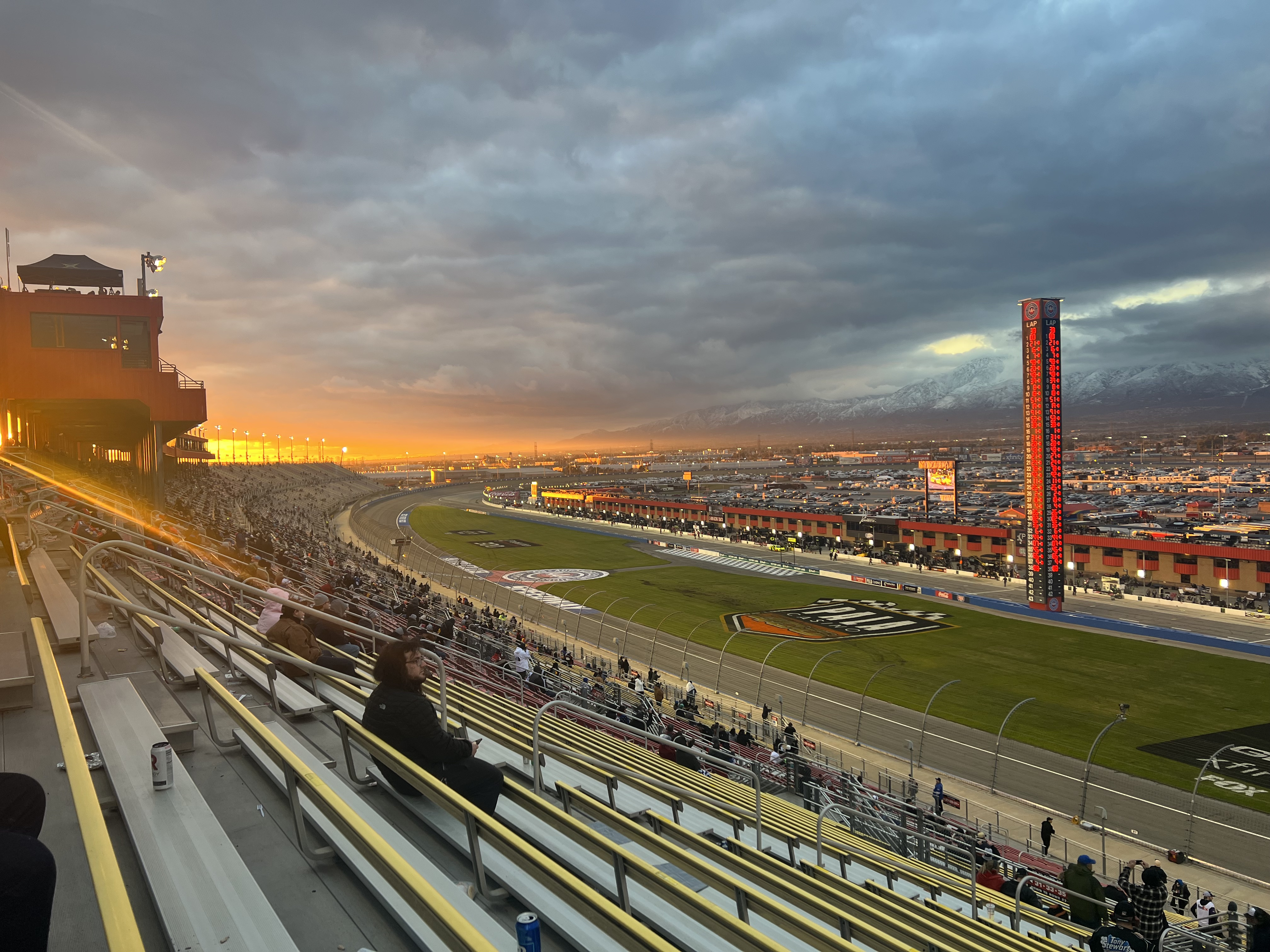
Auto Club Speedway, the track where the race was held.

Auto Club Speedway (previously California Speedway) was a two-mile (3.2-kilometre), low-banked, D-shaped oval superspeedway in Fontana, California which hosted NASCAR racing annually from 1997 to 2023. It was also used for open wheel racing events. The racetrack was located near the former locations of Ontario Motor Speedway and Riverside International Raceway. The track was owned and operated by International Speedway Corporation and was the only track owned by ISC to have its naming rights sold. The speedway was served by the nearby Interstate 10 and Interstate 15 freeways as well as a Metrolink station located behind the backstretch.

Kevin Harvick entered Auto Club with a 22-point lead over Joey Logano following his win the week before at Phoenix. Martin Truex Jr. entered 27 points back in third. Kasey Kahne entered 50 points back in fourth, with A. J. Allmendinger a further 5 points behind, in fifth.

==== Changes to qualifying ====
"We're looking at not backing in the cars any more. We did that initially working everybody, with you guys and TV partners in terms of access to the drivers. As we've gone through it we've learned some different things so we won't have the cars backed in. We'll send a memo out to the teams this week where we'll tweak it. As with anything you keep learning if we can make it better and we will and this is just another slight adjustment as we head into California".

— NASCAR executive vice-president Steve O'Donnell speaking on Sirius XM NASCAR Radio.

Starting at Auto Club Speedway – and taking effect in all three national touring series – drivers will no longer back out of their pit stalls when qualifying begins. Instead, they will now be parked with the nose of the car facing toward the track.

==== Entry list ====
| No. | Driver | Team | Manufacturer |
|---|---|---|---|
| 1 | Jamie McMurray | Chip Ganassi Racing | Chevrolet |
| 2 | Brad Keselowski (PC3) | Team Penske | Ford |
| 3 | Austin Dillon | Richard Childress Racing | Chevrolet |
| 4 | Kevin Harvick (PC1) | Stewart–Haas Racing | Chevrolet |
| 5 | Kasey Kahne | Hendrick Motorsports | Chevrolet |
| 6 | Trevor Bayne | Roush Fenway Racing | Ford |
| 7 | Alex Bowman | Tommy Baldwin Racing | Chevrolet |
| 9 | Sam Hornish Jr. | Richard Petty Motorsports | Ford |
| 10 | Danica Patrick | Stewart–Haas Racing | Chevrolet |
| 11 | Denny Hamlin | Joe Gibbs Racing | Toyota |
| 13 | Casey Mears | Germain Racing | Chevrolet |
| 14 | Tony Stewart (PC4) | Stewart–Haas Racing | Chevrolet |
| 15 | Clint Bowyer | Michael Waltrip Racing | Toyota |
| 16 | Greg Biffle | Roush Fenway Racing | Ford |
| 17 | Ricky Stenhouse Jr. | Roush Fenway Racing | Ford |
| 18 | David Ragan | Joe Gibbs Racing | Toyota |
| 19 | Carl Edwards | Joe Gibbs Racing | Toyota |
| 20 | Matt Kenseth (PC6) | Joe Gibbs Racing | Toyota |
| 22 | Joey Logano | Team Penske | Ford |
| 23 | J. J. Yeley (i) | BK Racing | Toyota |
| 24 | Jeff Gordon (PC7) | Hendrick Motorsports | Chevrolet |
| 26 | Jeb Burton (R) | BK Racing | Toyota |
| 27 | Paul Menard | Richard Childress Racing | Chevrolet |
| 29 | Reed Sorenson | RAB Racing | Toyota |
| 31 | Ryan Newman | Richard Childress Racing | Chevrolet |
| 32 | Mike Bliss (i) | Go FAS Racing | Ford |
| 33 | Brian Scott (i) | Hillman–Circle Sport | Chevrolet |
| 34 | Chris Buescher (i) | Front Row Motorsports | Ford |
| 35 | Cole Whitt | Front Row Motorsports | Ford |
| 38 | David Gilliland | Front Row Motorsports | Ford |
| 40 | Landon Cassill (i) | Hillman–Circle Sport | Chevrolet |
| 41 | Kurt Busch (PC5) | Stewart–Haas Racing | Chevrolet |
| 42 | Kyle Larson | Chip Ganassi Racing | Chevrolet |
| 43 | Aric Almirola | Richard Petty Motorsports | Ford |
| 44 | Travis Kvapil (i) | Team XTREME Racing | Chevrolet |
| 46 | Michael Annett | HScott Motorsports | Chevrolet |
| 47 | A. J. Allmendinger | JTG Daugherty Racing | Chevrolet |
| 48 | Jimmie Johnson (PC2) | Hendrick Motorsports | Chevrolet |
| 51 | Justin Allgaier | HScott Motorsports | Chevrolet |
| 55 | Brett Moffitt (R) | Michael Waltrip Racing | Toyota |
| 62 | Brendan Gaughan (i) | Premium Motorsports | Chevrolet |
| 78 | Martin Truex Jr. | Furniture Row Racing | Chevrolet |
| 83 | Matt DiBenedetto (R) | BK Racing | Toyota |
| 88 | Dale Earnhardt Jr. | Hendrick Motorsports | Chevrolet |
| 98 | Josh Wise | Phil Parsons Racing | Ford |
Official initial entry list
Official updated entry list

| Key | Meaning |
|---|---|
| (R) | Rookie |
| (i) | Ineligible for points |
| (PC#) | Past champions provisional |

== First practice ==
Kurt Busch was the fastest in the first practice session with a time of 38.556 seconds and a speed of 186.741 mph (300.531 km/h). Greg Biffle scraped the wall exiting turn 4 in the opening minutes of the session, causing cosmetic damage to his car. Carl Edwards, however, went to a backup car for the race after crashing his car on the exit of turn 4. Edwards joked that his car "went from a 12-inch to a six-inch sub real quick", referring to the sponsors of his car for the race, fast food franchise Subway. He also stated that he "tried to save it...that was not the right decision". Since the change took place prior to qualifying, Edwards is not mandated to start from the rear on Sunday, provided he does not change engines.

| Pos | No. | Driver | Team | Manufacturer | Time | Speed |
|---|---|---|---|---|---|---|
| 1 | 41 | Kurt Busch | Stewart–Haas Racing | Chevrolet | 38.556 | 186.741 |
| 2 | 11 | Denny Hamlin | Joe Gibbs Racing | Toyota | 38.838 | 185.385 |
| 3 | 78 | Martin Truex Jr. | Furniture Row Racing | Chevrolet | 38.881 | 185.180 |
Official first practice results

== Qualifying ==
"This is huge for Gene Haas. That is what I wanted to start the interview with is thank you Gene for believing in me. This is my job. Come to the track, drive the car and put it up on the pole and go for wins. That is what Gene has told me to do from the get go and I'm glad I have this chance to go back out there and live up to why he hired me. It feels good. The guys were just spot on all day with all the adjustments. The car started off so fast and it is all due to the work back at the shop."

— Kurt Busch, after taking his first pole position since 2013.

Kurt Busch won the pole with a time of 38.889 seconds and a speed of 185.142 mph (297.957 km/h), taking his first pole position since the 2013 Bojangles' Southern 500 at Darlington Raceway. His teammate Kevin Harvick started next to him on the front row. Harvick stated that "hopefully, [they] can keep it up this week", referring to his ongoing seven-race streak of Top 2 finishes, while also stating that he "didn't get to run where [he] wanted to run there were three cars on the apron down there where [he] wanted to be that had finished their lap". Reed Sorenson and Travis Kvapil both failed to qualify for the race. Brett Moffitt went to a backup car following damage sustained in qualifying and as a result, he started from the rear.

=== Qualifying results ===
| Pos | No. | Driver | Team | Manufacturer | R1 | R2 | R3 |
|---|---|---|---|---|---|---|---|
| 1 | 41 | Kurt Busch | Stewart–Haas Racing | Chevrolet | 38.979 | 38.911 | 38.889 |
| 2 | 4 | Kevin Harvick | Stewart–Haas Racing | Chevrolet | 38.905 | 39.080 | 38.909 |
| 3 | 20 | Matt Kenseth | Joe Gibbs Racing | Toyota | 38.791 | 39.104 | 38.926 |
| 4 | 18 | David Ragan | Joe Gibbs Racing | Toyota | 39.022 | 39.029 | 38.943 |
| 5 | 42 | Kyle Larson | Chip Ganassi Racing | Chevrolet | 39.033 | 39.197 | 39.059 |
| 6 | 11 | Denny Hamlin | Joe Gibbs Racing | Toyota | 39.048 | 39.000 | 39.081 |
| 7 | 24 | Jeff Gordon | Hendrick Motorsports | Chevrolet | 39.374 | 39.017 | 39.112 |
| 8 | 2 | Brad Keselowski | Team Penske | Ford | 39.131 | 39.084 | 39.117 |
| 9 | 31 | Ryan Newman | Richard Childress Racing | Chevrolet | 39.299 | 39.141 | 39.189 |
| 10 | 15 | Clint Bowyer | Michael Waltrip Racing | Toyota | 39.442 | 39.196 | 39.257 |
| 11 | 27 | Paul Menard | Richard Childress Racing | Chevrolet | 39.260 | 39.251 | 39.262 |
| 12 | 78 | Martin Truex Jr. | Furniture Row Racing | Chevrolet | 39.464 | 39.235 | 39.280 |
| 13 | 22 | Joey Logano | Team Penske | Ford | 39.344 | 39.275 | — |
| 14 | 48 | Jimmie Johnson | Hendrick Motorsports | Chevrolet | 39.097 | 39.289 | — |
| 15 | 19 | Carl Edwards | Joe Gibbs Racing | Toyota | 39.420 | 39.349 | — |
| 16 | 9 | Sam Hornish Jr. | Richard Petty Motorsports | Ford | 39.431 | 39.365 | — |
| 17 | 88 | Dale Earnhardt Jr. | Hendrick Motorsports | Chevrolet | 39.211 | 39.377 | — |
| 18 | 47 | A. J. Allmendinger | JTG Daugherty Racing | Chevrolet | 39.432 | 39.395 | — |
| 19 | 5 | Kasey Kahne | Hendrick Motorsports | Chevrolet | 39.375 | 39.399 | — |
| 20 | 14 | Tony Stewart | Stewart–Haas Racing | Chevrolet | 39.559 | 39.464 | — |
| 21 | 3 | Austin Dillon | Richard Childress Racing | Chevrolet | 39.377 | 39.486 | — |
| 22 | 10 | Danica Patrick | Stewart–Haas Racing | Chevrolet | 39.551 | 39.530 | — |
| 23 | 43 | Aric Almirola | Richard Petty Motorsports | Ford | 39.576 | 39.604 | — |
| 24 | 46 | Michael Annett | HScott Motorsports | Chevrolet | 39.586 | 39.912 | — |
| 25 | 33 | Brian Scott (i) | Hillman–Circle Sport | Chevrolet | 39.611 | — | — |
| 26 | 1 | Jamie McMurray | Chip Ganassi Racing | Chevrolet | 39.642 | — | — |
| 27 | 17 | Ricky Stenhouse Jr. | Roush Fenway Racing | Ford | 39.657 | — | — |
| 28 | 7 | Alex Bowman | Tommy Baldwin Racing | Chevrolet | 39.684 | — | — |
| 29 | 16 | Greg Biffle | Roush Fenway Racing | Ford | 39.693 | — | — |
| 30 | 55 | Brett Moffitt (R) (Note: Brett Moffitt started from the rear after switching to a backup car post-qualifying. He sustained damage to his primary car during qualifying.) | Michael Waltrip Racing | Toyota | 39.731 | — | — |
| 31 | 51 | Justin Allgaier | HScott Motorsports | Chevrolet | 39.780 | — | — |
| 32 | 35 | Cole Whitt | Front Row Motorsports | Ford | 39.876 | — | — |
| 33 | 34 | Chris Buescher (i) | Front Row Motorsports | Ford | 39.888 | — | — |
| 34 | 26 | Jeb Burton (R) | BK Racing | Toyota | 39.995 | — | — |
| 35 | 98 | Josh Wise | Phil Parsons Racing | Ford | 40.050 | — | — |
| 36 | 6 | Trevor Bayne | Roush Fenway Racing | Ford | 40.153 | — | — |
| 37 | 13 | Casey Mears | Germain Racing | Chevrolet | 40.212 | — | — |
| 38 | 62 | Brendan Gaughan (i) | Premium Motorsports | Chevrolet | 40.312 | — | — |
| 39 | 32 | Mike Bliss (i) | Go FAS Racing | Ford | 40.375 | — | — |
| 40 | 40 | Landon Cassill (i) | Hillman–Circle Sport | Chevrolet | 40.501 | — | — |
| 41 | 23 | J. J. Yeley (i) | BK Racing | Toyota | 40.798 | — | — |
| 42 | 83 | Matt DiBenedetto (R) | BK Racing | Toyota | 40.886 | — | — |
| 43 | 38 | David Gilliland | Front Row Motorsports | Ford | 41.041 | — | — |
Failed to qualify
| 44 | 44 | Travis Kvapil (i) | Team XTREME Racing | Chevrolet | 40.431 | — | — |
| 45 | 29 | Reed Sorenson | RAB Racing | Toyota | 40.706 | — | — |
Official qualifying results

== Practice (post-qualifying) ==
=== Second practice ===
Kurt Busch was the fastest in the second practice session with a time of 38.479 and a speed of 187.115 mph (301.132 km/h).

| Pos | No. | Driver | Team | Manufacturer | Time | Speed |
|---|---|---|---|---|---|---|
| 1 | 41 | Kurt Busch | Stewart–Haas Racing | Chevrolet | 38.479 | 187.115 |
| 2 | 48 | Jimmie Johnson | Hendrick Motorsports | Chevrolet | 39.078 | 184.247 |
| 3 | 18 | David Ragan | Joe Gibbs Racing | Toyota | 39.080 | 184.237 |
Official second practice results

=== Final practice ===
Kurt Busch was the fastest in the final practice session with a time of 38.925 and a speed of 184.971 mph (297.682 km/h), completing a sweep of the weekend's practice sessions and qualifying.

| Pos | No. | Driver | Team | Manufacturer | Time | Speed |
|---|---|---|---|---|---|---|
| 1 | 41 | Kurt Busch | Stewart–Haas Racing | Chevrolet | 38.925 | 184.971 |
| 2 | 27 | Paul Menard | Richard Childress Racing | Chevrolet | 39.155 | 183.885 |
| 3 | 4 | Kevin Harvick | Stewart–Haas Racing | Chevrolet | 39.297 | 183.220 |
Official final practice results

== Race ==
=== First-half ===
==== Start ====
As the cars were rolling off pit road, Jeff Gordon's crew swapped out something in his car, but rejoined the starting lineup with no issues. The race was scheduled to start at 3:46 p.m., but started six minutes later when Kurt Busch led the field to the green flag. The field spread out to use up about five lanes in the opening laps. Eventually, Kevin Harvick reeled in his teammate to take the lead on lap seven. Early in the race, A. J. Allmendinger began reporting that he was losing the engine of his car, while Martin Truex Jr. did likewise. Harvick was unable to pull away from Busch who began reeling him in until Busch was slowed down by the lapped car of Jeb Burton. The first caution of the race flew on lap 23 when David Ragan got turned by an aerodynamic push from Gordon's car in turn 4. Gordon had been saying on the radio that he would turn Ragan if he had to, stating over his in-car radio to "let him know it's the bumper". Alex Bowman stayed out to lead a lap before pitting and handed the lead to Matt Kenseth.

==== Restart from caution 1 and green flag stops ====
The race restarted on lap 28. Kenseth held the lead for five laps before yielding to teammate Denny Hamlin on lap 33. A cycle of green flag stops began on lap 60. Hamlin pitted on lap 62 and handed the lead to Jeff Gordon. He pitted on lap 63 and the lead cycled back to Hamlin. Ragan and Matt DiBenedetto served drive-through penalties for uncontrolled tires on pit road, while Alex Bowman also served a drive-through for speeding.

By lap 83, more than half the field were at least one lap down, before the second caution of the race flew on lap 86 for debris in turn 3. After the culmination of the next round of stops, Kenseth exited pit road with the lead.

=== Second-half ===
==== Caution at halfway ====
The race restarted on lap 93. Going beneath Kenseth in turn 4, Busch took back the lead on lap 96. Two laps later, the third caution of the race flew when Sam Hornish Jr. moved up the track exiting turn 2 and got turned into the wall by Trevor Bayne. Martin Truex Jr. exited pit road with the lead by taking two tires.

The race restarted on lap 105. Truex did not hold the lead for long as Kurt Busch took the lead back in turn 1. Busch, Harvick and a mess of cars hit pit road on lap 138. Paul Menard briefly took the lead, but did not lead a lap through it while Carl Edwards did and the lead cycled back to Kurt Busch following a brief drag race down the back stretch with teammate Kevin Harvick. Michael Annett served a drive-through penalty for an uncontrolled tire.

Harvick took the lead back with 56 laps to go, putting Busch in 2nd. The fourth caution of the race flew with 47 laps to go for debris on the front stretch. Matt Kenseth exited pit road with the lead. Joey Logano was forced to drop to the tail end of the line for an uncontrolled tire.

==== Restart from caution 4 and 5th caution ====
The race restarted with 42 laps to go, with Matt Kenseth still out in front. Debris in turn 1 brought out the fifth caution of the race with 16 laps to go. Kurt Busch took the lead on pit road from Matt Kenseth who was pitted behind the start/finish line and exited with the lead. Kenseth broke an axle exiting his pit stall, while Denny Hamlin was forced to drop to the tail end of the line for an uncontrolled tire.

==== Fifth restart and 6th caution ====
The race restarted with eleven laps to go and Harvick lost the lead to Kurt Busch. The two of them fought it out for the last few laps. The sixth caution of the race flew with two laps to go for debris in turn 4. Jeff Gordon stayed out to take the lead along with Tony Stewart and Greg Biffle.

==== Green–white–checker finish ====
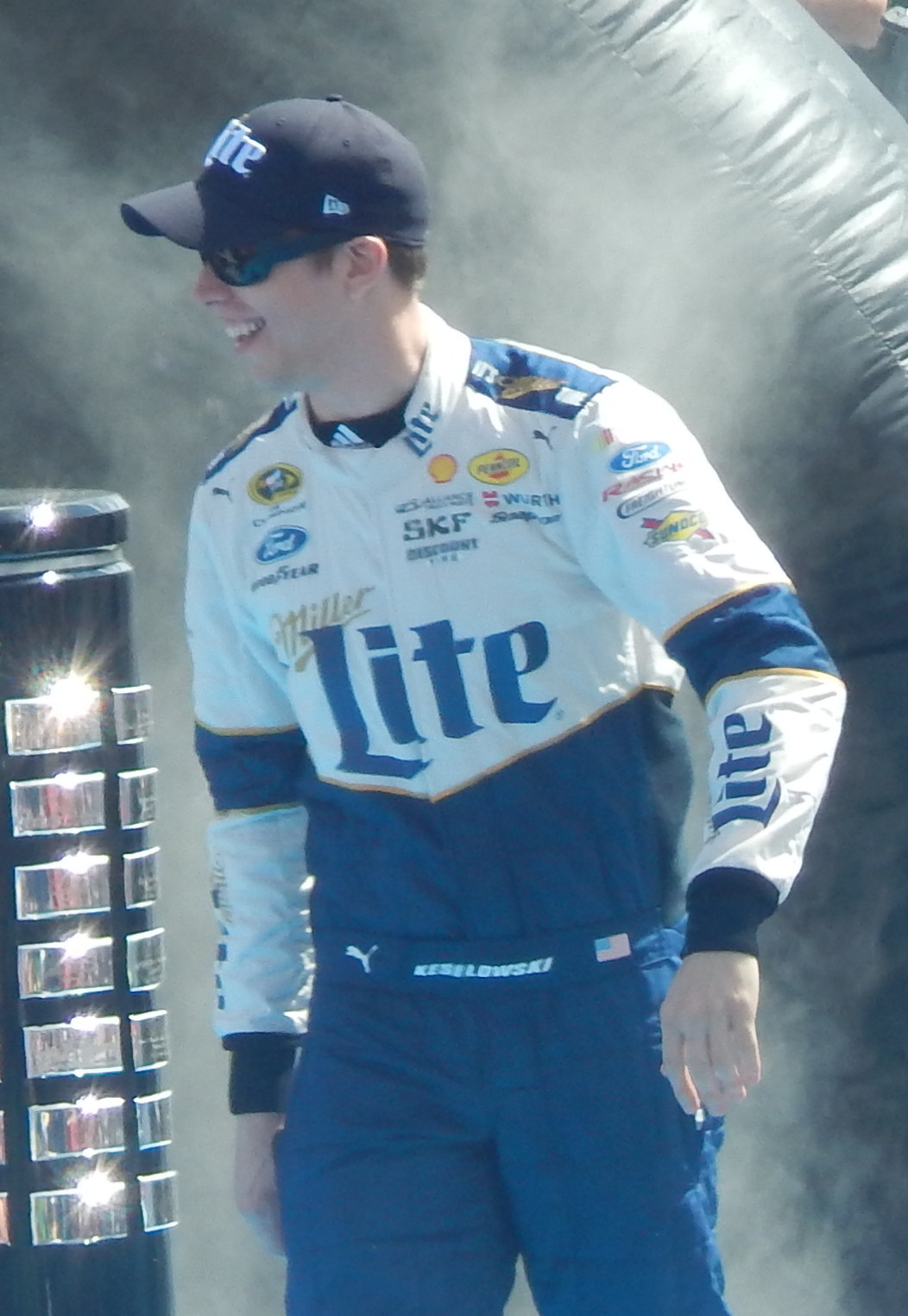
Brad Keselowski, seen here at the 2015 Daytona 500, scored his 17th career win at Auto Club.

On the first attempt at a green–white–checker finish, Kyle Larson slid into the wall exiting turn 2 and lost his rear bumper, causing another caution flag, the seventh of the race. On the second attempt, Kurt Busch led the field to the green. As the white flag was waving, Greg Biffle wrecked on the front stretch. Brad Keselowski took the lead in turn 2 and powered to the checkered flag. Keselowski praised the work of his team to beat Kevin Harvick and Kurt Busch, who Keselowski stated "had great cars the whole weekend and probably had the field covered on speed". Harvick, who recorded his eighth consecutive top-two finish, explained that he had "fought through a day of track position" but "that's what this team is made of". Busch, who completed the top three, bemoaned the latter cautions, expressing that his car "just got hung out" and that he "just didn't get the job done". All 43 cars were running at the race's conclusion, for the first time since the 2013 Brickyard 400 at Indianapolis Motor Speedway.

== Race results ==
| Pos | No. | Driver | Team | Manufacturer | Laps | Points |
|---|---|---|---|---|---|---|
| 1 | 2 | Brad Keselowski | Team Penske | Ford | 209 | 47 |
| 2 | 4 | Kevin Harvick | Stewart–Haas Racing | Chevrolet | 209 | 43 |
| 3 | 41 | Kurt Busch | Stewart–Haas Racing | Chevrolet | 209 | 43 |
| 4 | 27 | Paul Menard | Richard Childress Racing | Chevrolet | 209 | 40 |
| 5 | 31 | Ryan Newman | Richard Childress Racing | Chevrolet | 209 | (−36) |
| 6 | 88 | Dale Earnhardt Jr. | Hendrick Motorsports | Chevrolet | 209 | 38 |
| 7 | 22 | Joey Logano | Team Penske | Ford | 209 | 37 |
| 8 | 78 | Martin Truex Jr. | Furniture Row Racing | Chevrolet | 209 | 37 |
| 9 | 48 | Jimmie Johnson | Hendrick Motorsports | Chevrolet | 209 | 35 |
| 10 | 24 | Jeff Gordon | Hendrick Motorsports | Chevrolet | 209 | 35 |
| 11 | 43 | Aric Almirola | Richard Petty Motorsports | Ford | 209 | 33 |
| 12 | 51 | Justin Allgaier | HScott Motorsports | Chevrolet | 209 | 32 |
| 13 | 19 | Carl Edwards | Joe Gibbs Racing | Toyota | 209 | 32 |
| 14 | 14 | Tony Stewart | Stewart–Haas Racing | Chevrolet | 209 | 30 |
| 15 | 17 | Ricky Stenhouse Jr. | Roush Fenway Racing | Ford | 209 | 29 |
| 16 | 3 | Austin Dillon | Richard Childress Racing | Chevrolet | 209 | 28 |
| 17 | 5 | Kasey Kahne | Hendrick Motorsports | Chevrolet | 209 | 27 |
| 18 | 18 | David Ragan | Joe Gibbs Racing | Toyota | 209 | 26 |
| 19 | 10 | Danica Patrick | Stewart–Haas Racing | Chevrolet | 209 | 25 |
| 20 | 34 | Chris Buescher (i) | Front Row Motorsports | Ford | 209 | 0 |
| 21 | 1 | Jamie McMurray | Chip Ganassi Racing | Chevrolet | 209 | 23 |
| 22 | 55 | Brett Moffitt (R) | Michael Waltrip Racing | Toyota | 209 | 22 |
| 23 | 13 | Casey Mears | Germain Racing | Chevrolet | 209 | 21 |
| 24 | 35 | Cole Whitt | Front Row Motorsports | Ford | 209 | 20 |
| 25 | 40 | Landon Cassill (i) | Hillman–Circle Sport | Chevrolet | 209 | 0 |
| 26 | 42 | Kyle Larson | Chip Ganassi Racing | Chevrolet | 209 | 18 |
| 27 | 33 | Brian Scott (i) | Hillman–Circle Sport | Chevrolet | 209 | 0 |
| 28 | 11 | Denny Hamlin | Joe Gibbs Racing | Toyota | 209 | 17 |
| 29 | 6 | Trevor Bayne | Roush Fenway Racing | Ford | 209 | 15 |
| 30 | 15 | Clint Bowyer | Michael Waltrip Racing | Toyota | 209 | 14 |
| 31 | 20 | Matt Kenseth | Joe Gibbs Racing | Toyota | 209 | 14 |
| 32 | 16 | Greg Biffle | Roush Fenway Racing | Ford | 209 | 12 |
| 33 | 7 | Alex Bowman | Tommy Baldwin Racing | Chevrolet | 208 | 12 |
| 34 | 47 | A. J. Allmendinger | JTG Daugherty Racing | Chevrolet | 208 | 10 |
| 35 | 38 | David Gilliland | Front Row Motorsports | Ford | 208 | 9 |
| 36 | 98 | Josh Wise | Phil Parsons Racing | Ford | 207 | 8 |
| 37 | 23 | J. J. Yeley (i) | BK Racing | Toyota | 206 | 0 |
| 38 | 46 | Michael Annett | HScott Motorsports | Chevrolet | 206 | 6 |
| 39 | 26 | Jeb Burton (R) | BK Racing | Toyota | 205 | 5 |
| 40 | 32 | Mike Bliss (i) | Go FAS Racing | Ford | 205 | 0 |
| 41 | 62 | Brendan Gaughan (i) | Premium Motorsports | Chevrolet | 205 | 0 |
| 42 | 83 | Matt DiBenedetto (R) | BK Racing | Toyota | 203 | 2 |
| 43 | 9 | Sam Hornish Jr. | Richard Petty Motorsports | Ford | 155 | 1 |
Official Auto Club 400 results

=== Race statistics ===
- 19 lead changes among 9 different drivers
- 7 cautions for 31 laps
- Time of race: 2 hours, 58 minutes, 18 seconds
- Average speed: 140.662 mph (226.374 km/h)
- Brad Keselowski took home $357,871 in winnings

Lap Leaders
| Laps | Leader |
|---|---|
| 1–5 | Kurt Busch |
| 6–24 | Kevin Harvick |
| 25 | Alex Bowman |
| 26–31 | Matt Kenseth |
| 32–61 | Denny Hamlin |
| 62 | Jeff Gordon |
| 63–88 | Denny Hamlin |
| 89–94 | Matt Kenseth |
| 95–99 | Kurt Busch |
| 100–104 | Martin Truex Jr. |
| 105–137 | Kurt Busch |
| 138 | Carl Edwards |
| 139–143 | Kurt Busch |
| 144–154 | Kevin Harvick |
| 155–185 | Matt Kenseth |
| 186–189 | Kevin Harvick |
| 190–200 | Kurt Busch |
| 201–202 | Jeff Gordon |
| 203–208 | Kurt Busch |
| 209 | Brad Keselowski |

Total laps led
| Leader | Laps |
|---|---|
| Kurt Busch | 65 |
| Denny Hamlin | 56 |
| Matt Kenseth | 43 |
| Kevin Harvick | 34 |
| Martin Truex Jr. | 5 |
| Jeff Gordon | 3 |
| Brad Keselowski | 1 |
| Carl Edwards | 1 |
| Alex Bowman | 1 |

==== Race awards ====
- Coors Light Pole Award: Kurt Busch (38.889, 186.741 mph (300.531 km/h))
- 3M Lap Leader: Kurt Busch (65 laps)
- American Ethanol Green Flag Restart Award: Kurt Busch (40.426, 178.902 mph (287.915 km/h))
- Duralast Brakes "Bake In The Race" Award: Kevin Harvick
- Freescale "Wide Open": Kurt Busch
- Ingersoll Rand Power Move: Justin Allgaier, 5 positions
- MAHLE Clevite Engine Builder of the Race: Hendrick Engines, #41
- Mobil 1 Driver of the Race: Kurt Busch (135.4 driver rating)
- Moog Steering and Suspension Problem Solver of The Race: Paul Menard (crew chief Justin Alexander 0.092 seconds)
- NASCAR Sprint Cup Leader Bonus: No winner: rolls over to $20,000 at next event
- Sherwin-Williams Fastest Lap: David Ragan (Lap 2: 39.231, 183.528 mph (295.360 km/h))
- Sunoco Rookie of The Race: Brett Moffitt

== Post-race ==
=== Confrontation between Stewart and Truex ===
Following the race, Tony Stewart confronted Martin Truex Jr. on pit road. The issue stemmed from Truex trying to get down after Aric Almirola on the bottom of the track and almost collected Stewart in the process. Stewart told reporters that after the issue between Truex and Almirola, Truex "drove across the race track into us" and that the move was "just stupid".

=== Tire confiscation ===
Following the race, NASCAR took tires from the teams of Kevin Harvick, Kurt Busch, Paul Menard and Ryan Newman – all of whom finished in the top five – which were sent to an unnamed third party for further evaluation, instead of to NASCAR's R&D Center in Charlotte, North Carolina.

=== NASCAR explanation ===
"The process of calling any caution involves multiple people. We'll obviously scan the drivers and spotters, and if we hear anything, we've got corner workers, we've got folks on the flag stand. We'll survey all of those folks once we hear that there may be something on the track. If it's not moving, we'll confirm that that piece is not moving and we'll assume, candidly, that it's metal. If it's in the groove, obviously, that becomes a safety issue, we're going to throw the caution each and every time when that happens. If someone would have run over that and it affected a tire and that driver had an incident, we'd be hearing it on the other end as well. That's something we've got to deal with it. That's our job to make the call. We will always err on the side of safety if we see something out there and can't confirm that it's moving or not. When it's not moving, in most cases, it is a piece of metal or something heavy that is going to affect the race car."

— NASCAR executive vice-president Steve O'Donnell speaking on Sirius XM NASCAR Radio.

Following the race, Richard Buck, director of competition for the Sprint Cup Series, met with the media to address a few of the late race calls. The calls included a debris call with two laps to go, multiple reports of debris before the scheduled finish, and not calling a caution for Greg Biffle's spin on the final lap.

NASCAR executive vice-president Steve O'Donnell joined Mike Bagley and Pete Pistone on Sirius XM NASCAR Radio programme The Morning Drive the next day to further address the calls made late in the race. O'Donnell discussed how the previous day's situation was different from a similar situation with the previous month's Daytona 500, and concluded the interview with a reiteration of what Richard Buck had told the media after the race.

=== Penalties ===
On the Wednesday following the race, NASCAR penalized the No. 33 team of Brian Scott for a rules infraction discovered during opening day inspection on Friday. The infraction was a P4 level penalty and violated the following sections in the 2015 NASCAR rule book:

- 12.1: Actions detrimental to stock car racing;
- 20.14.2: Rear Suspension: Truck Trailing Arm

- E. The left and right side truck trailing arms must be mounted to the truck trailing arm mounting brackets using a one-piece, minimum ¾ inch diameter magnetic steel bolt.

- F. The horizontal centerline of the highest truck trailing arm mounting bolt must not be higher than the top surface of the truck trailing arm crossmember, at the respective truck trailing arm mounting bracket, when the vehicle is at inspection orientation.

INFRACTION: The ¾ inch diameter magnetic steel truck trailing arm mounting bolt was not installed horizontally.

- J. Truck trailing arm must conform to the following drawing as specified in the NASCAR rule book: Rear Suspension-Truck Trailing Arm: A-008-00183-14 Rev.C

INFRACTION: Truck trailing arm monoball sleeve does not meet the drawing specifications. Sleeve is required to be minimum .125 inch minimum thick x two inches wide sleeve machined for press fit of .750 I.D. or .875 I.D. monoball assembly.

- 20.3.3.2.1: Truck Trailing Arm Crossmember Assembly:Truck Trailing Arm Mounting Brackets

- B. Truck trailing arm mounting brackets must be constructed of magnetic steel flat plate with a minimum thickness of 0.169 inch.

INFRACTION: Truck trailing arm mounting bracket adapter was machined from Aluminum solid.

- 20.20: Assembled Vehicle Overall Rules
- A. Except in cases explicitly permitted in the NASCAR rules, installation of additional components and/or modifications of existing components to affect the aerodynamic properties of the vehicle will not be permitted, including but not limited to, safety systems, chassis and roll cage, suspension, steering systems, brake systems, heat shields, body fillers, body sealers, filler panels, drivetrain components and exhaust components.

The options for a P4 penalty are outlined the following sections of the NASCAR rule book:

- 12.5.3.4: P4 Penalty Options:

- A. Violations leading to P4 penalties, in general, are very serious. They include, but are not limited to, a broad range of infractions such as:

- B. Parts which do not meet specifications

- F. Measurement failures of significance

- G. These often involve primary component or system infractions not otherwise to the magnitude of P5 infractions, but could also include secondary component or system infractions, particularly if of a nature suggesting some of the characteristics described in P5 ... and/or involving safety implications.

- 12.5.3.4.2: Minimum P4 Penalty Options (includes all three points below):

- A. Loss of 25 championship driver and owner points, regardless of whether the violation occurred during a Championship race or not.

- B. $40,000–$75,000 fine

- C. Suspension for the next three series Championship Races, plus any non-championship races or special events which might occur during that time period, for the crew chief, plus probation through the end of the calendar year, or probation for a six month period following the issuance of the penalty notice if that period spans across two consecutive seasons.

As a result of this violation, crew chief Slugger Labbe was fined $50,000 and suspended for the next three NASCAR Sprint Cup Series Championship races, plus any non-championship races or special events which might occur during that time period. Labbe has also been placed on NASCAR probation through Dec. 31. In addition, car owner Joe Falk was docked 25 championship car owner points.

==== Appeal ====
On Tuesday, April 14, the penalties were reduced to a P2 level. The suspension of Slugger Labbe was upheld, but the fine was reduced to $20,000. The 25 point penalty handed to the team was reduced to a ten-point penalty. "The process was very fair," Falk said in a statement. "We agree the part should have been presented (beforehand) to the R&D Center. We're satisfied with the outcome and we won't appeal further."

=== Further penalties ===
"NASCAR takes very seriously its responsibility to govern and regulate the rules of the sport in order to ensure competitive balance. We've been very clear that any modifications to race vehicle tires is an unacceptable practice and will not be tolerated."

— Steve O'Donnell, NASCAR executive vice president, after the penalties were announced.

Later on, Ryan Newman's team was penalized for rules infractions discovered as a result of NASCAR's post-event tire audit conducted following the race. The infractions amounted to a P5 level penalty and violated numerous sections in the 2015 NASCAR rule book:

- 12.1: Actions detrimental to stock car racing
- 20.16: Wheels and tires

- A. Any device, modification, or procedure to the tire or wheel, including the valve stem hardware, that is used to release pressure, beyond normal pressure adjustments, from the tire and/or inner shield, will not be permitted.

- 20.16.2: Tires

- F. Modifications to the tires, by treatment or any other means, will not be permitted.

- Section 12.5.3.5.1 lists P5 Penalty Violation examples that could include but are not limited to:

- A. Effecting, modifying and/or altering the standard tires in any way, other than through authorized means such as tire pressure adjustments within the recommended range, permitted tire cooling when mounted on the race vehicle; or heat-cycling on the race vehicle on the race track earlier in the event.

- 12.5.3.5.2: Minimum P5 Penalty Options (includes all four points below):

- A. Loss of 50 championship driver and owner points, regardless of whether the violation occurred during a Championship race or not
- B. US$75,000–$125,000 fine
- C. Suspension for the next six series Championship Races, plus any non-championship races or special events which might occur during that time period, for the crew chief and any other team members as determined by NASCAR
- D. Probation through the end of the calendar year for all suspended members, or for a six-month period following the issuance of the penalty notice if that period spans across two consecutive seasons

- 12.5.3.5.3: P5 Level infractions detected during post-race inspection:

If the infraction is detected during post-race inspection, then the following penalty elements will be added to those listed previously in this section:

- A. Loss of an additional 25 Championship driver and owner points; regardless of whether it was a Championship Race or not
- B. Loss of an additional $50,000

As a result of the violations, crew chief Luke Lambert was fined $125,000, suspended from the next six Sprint Cup events, including any non-championship races or special events, and placed on NASCAR probation through December 31. James Bender, team tire technician, and Philip Surgen, team engineer, were also suspended for the same amount of time. Newman was penalized 75 driver and owner points.

==== Appeal ====
"I'm thankful for our opportunity to present our facts to the appeals panel and I appreciate their consideration of those facts and making the decision to reduce the fine and points penalty. However, I am disappointed in the decision not to completely overturn the penalty based on the facts that we presented today. At this point in time we are going to consider our options and discuss as a group what we are going to do moving forward."

— Luke Lambert's statement to the appeal's outcome.

On Thursday, April 16, the P5 penalty was upheld, but the fines and points loss were reduced. Instead of the 75 point maximum, Newman only lost the 50 point minimum and Luke Lambert's fine was reduced. Lambert's six race suspension was upheld. The three member National Motorsports Appeal Panel ruled that while the team had manipulated the tires (thus keeping it a P5 penalty), they amended the points and fines because "there is no written explanation of what constitutes post race inspection". This stemmed from the team's argument that the tires were not inspected post-race because they were confiscated during the race.

== Media ==
=== Television ===
Fox Sports covered their fifteenth race at Auto Club Speedway. Mike Joy, Larry McReynolds, and Darrell Waltrip had the call in the booth for the race. Jamie Little, Chris Neville, and Matt Yocum handled the pit road duties for the television side.

Fox
| Booth announcers | Pit reporters |
|---|---|
| Lap-by-lap: Mike Joy; Color-commentator: Larry McReynolds; Color commentator: Darrell Waltrip | Jamie Little; Chris Neville; Matt Yocum |

=== Radio ===
MRN had the radio call for the race which was also simulcast on Sirius XM NASCAR Radio. Joe Moore, Jeff Striegle and 2001 race winner Rusty Wallace called the race in the booth when the field was racing down the front stretch. Dan Hubbard called the race from atop a billboard outside turn 2 when the field was racing through turns 1 and 2. Kyle Rickey called the race from billboard outside turn 4 when the field was racing through turns 3 and 4. Alex Hayden, Glenn Jarrett and Winston Kelley worked pit road for MRN.

MRN
| Booth announcers | Turn announcers | Pit reporters |
|---|---|---|
| Lead announcer: Joe Moore; Announcer: Jeff Striegle; Announcer: Rusty Wallace | Turns 1 & 2: Dan Hubbard; Turns 3 & 4: Kyle Rickey | Alex Hayden; Glenn Jarrett; Winston Kelley |

== Standings after the race ==
Drivers' Championship standings

| | Pos | Driver | Points |
|---|---|---|---|
| | 1 | Kevin Harvick | 225 |
| | 2 | Joey Logano | 197 (−28) |
| | 3 | Martin Truex Jr. | 192 (−33) |
| 2 | 4 | Dale Earnhardt Jr. | 164 (−61) |
| 4 | 5 | Brad Keselowski | 163 (−62) |
| 1 | 6 | Jimmie Johnson | 159 (−66) |
| 3 | 7 | Kasey Kahne | 159 (−66) |
| 3 | 8 | Paul Menard | 152 (−73) |
| 5 | 9 | Aric Almirola | 138 (−87) |
| 5 | 10 | A. J. Allmendinger | 137 (−88) |
| 1 | 11 | Casey Mears | 132 (−93) |
| 2 | 12 | Matt Kenseth | 127 (−98) |
| | 13 | Denny Hamlin | 125 (−100) |
| 4 | 14 | David Ragan | 124 (−101) |
| 4 | 15 | Jamie McMurray | 120 (−105) |
| 5 | 16 | Carl Edwards | 120 (−105) |

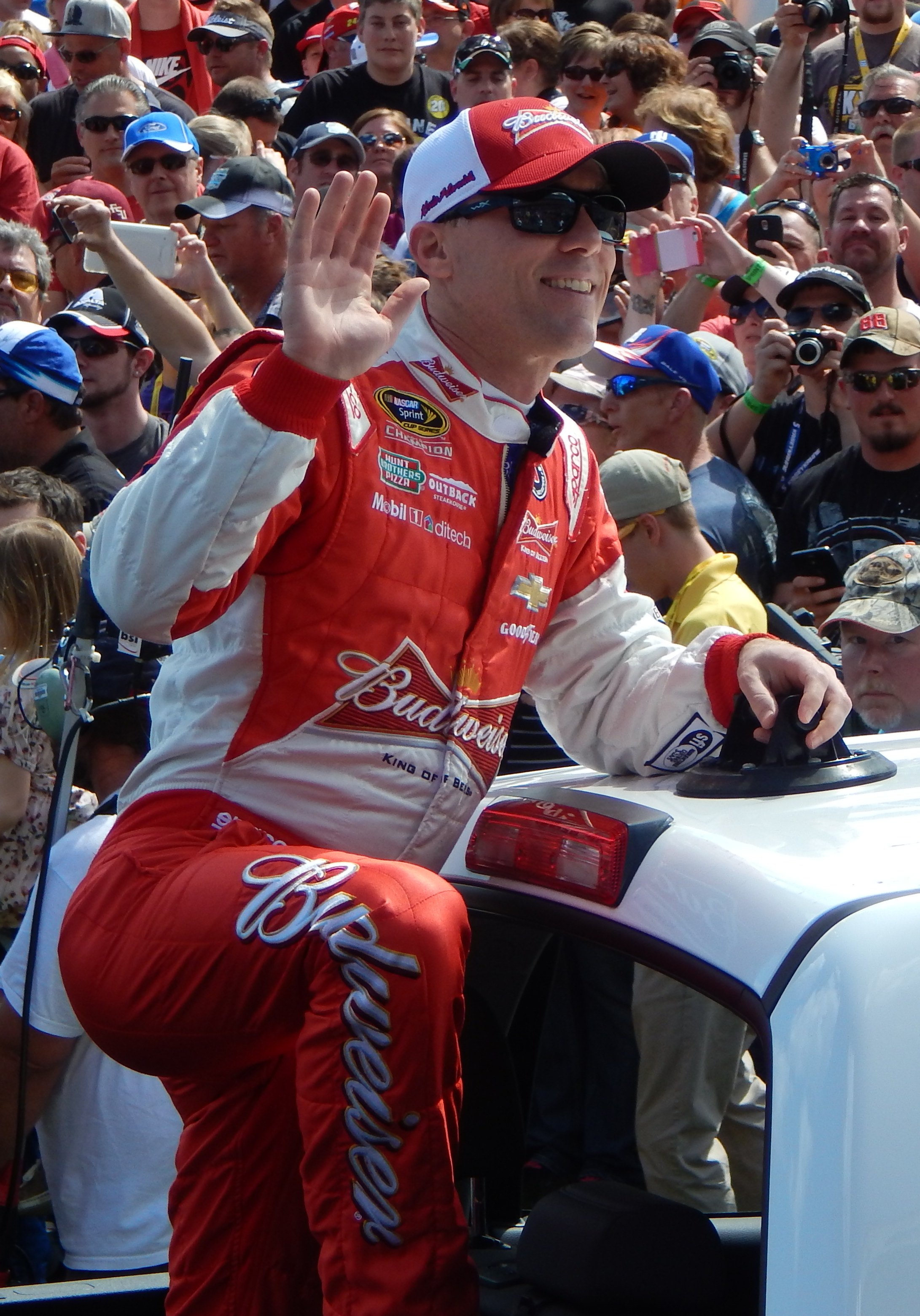
Kevin Harvick left Auto Club with a 28-point lead over Joey Logano.

Manufacturers' Championship standings

| Pos | Manufacturer | Points |
|---|---|---|
| 1 | Chevrolet | 228 |
| 2 | Ford | 212 (−16) |
| 3 | Toyota | 183 (−45) |

- Note: Only the first sixteen positions are included for the driver standings.

== Notes ==
| Previous race: 2015 CampingWorld.com 500 | Sprint Cup Series; 2015 season | Next race: 2015 STP 500 |
