= Moritz Michelson =

Moritz Ilyich Michelson
- Мориц Ильич Михельсон
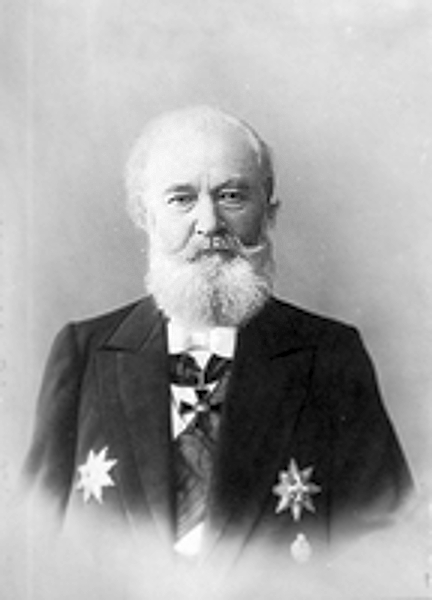
- Born: 28 December 1825; Saint Petersburg, Russian Empire
- Died: 2 May 1908 (aged 82); Saint Petersburg, Russian Empire
- Resting place: Smolensky Lutheran Cemetery
- Citizenship: Russian Empire
- Occupations: Philologist, literary scholar, writer
- Writing career
- Pen name: Rilingson
- Language: Russian, German
- Notable awards: Order of Saint Vladimir, 4th class

Moritz Ilyich Michelson (28 December [O.S. 16 December] 1825, Saint Petersburg – 2 May [O.S. 19 April] 1908, Saint Petersburg) was a Russian philologist, literary scholar, translator, teacher, and public figure of the 19th and 20th centuries; Active State Councillor.

== Biography ==
Moritz Michelson was born on 16 December 1825 into a Jewish family in Saint Petersburg.

He studied at the Main Pedagogical Institute; before completing the full course in 1845, he was sent to work at the Izyumsky Uyezd school.

In 1853–1857, he taught at the Larin Gymnasium. In 1868 he received the Order of Saint Vladimir, 4th class, and was elevated to noble status.

In 1896, together with his daughter Olga (1858–1942), he founded the Society for the Care of Homeless Children in St. Petersburg.

He was an inspector of schools of the Saint Petersburg Educational District and an elected councillor of the Saint Petersburg City Duma.

He died in Saint Petersburg on 19 April 1908. He was buried at the Smolensky Lutheran Cemetery in Saint Petersburg.

== Scientific activity ==
He spent 20 years studying Russian phraseology. In 1890, he closely translated Aleksey Koltsov into German, and later the fables of Ivan Krylov, Ivan Khemnitser and other writers. He wrote several textbooks on philology and linguistics. One of the largest works of his time was his dictionary Russian Thought and Speech (2 volumes, 1902–1903). It included over 11,000 articles containing quotations, proverbs, catchphrases and set expressions found in Russian oral and written speech, with explanations of their meaning, examples of use in classical Russian literature, and analogous expressions in foreign languages (Latin, French, English, German, Italian, Greek) with examples from foreign classical sources (indicating authors and works). The dictionary uses quotes from Shakespeare, Marlowe, Molière, Nicolas Boileau, Racine, Goethe, Heine, Ovid, the Bible, and many other sources. The dictionary allows one to understand the elusive meaning of many borrowed expressions and — unlike general explanatory dictionaries — considers a set of expressions similar in meaning simultaneously in several languages, which allows for a better understanding of their meaning, origin, and correct usage.

== Works ==
- Приготовительный курс русского языка [Preparatory course of the Russian language]. St. Petersburg, 1856.
- (under the pseudonym Rilingson) Практическое руководство для переводов с французского языка на русский и обратно. Для старших классов средних учебных заведений [Practical guide for translations from French into Russian and vice versa. For high school students]. St. Petersburg, 1865.
- Russische Gedichte von A. Kolzow / Deutsch von Moritz Michelsson. - St. Petersburg: Jablonsky & Perott, 1890. - VIII, 267 S. Collection of poems by A. V. Koltsov in German translation by M. Michelson, remarkable for its closeness to the original.
- Russischer Fabelschatz. Chemnitzer, Dmitriew, Ismailow, Fürst Wäsemsky, Krylow / Deutsch von Moritz Michelsson. St. Petersburg: Druck von H. Schroeder, 1890. XVI, 111 S. Translation of fables by I. I. Khemnitser, I. A. Krylov, Vladimir Izmaylov and others.
- Ходячие и меткие слова [Current and apt words]. St. Petersburg, 1894; 2nd revised and expanded ed. St. Petersburg, 1896 — a collection of phraseology, sayings, catchphrases, set phrases of the Russian language (about 4400 vocables) — with an appendix of comparisons in German, French, English, Italian, Latin and Greek.
- Русская мысль и речь. Своё и чужое. Опыт русской фразеологии [Russian thought and speech. One's own and others'. Experience of Russian phraseology]. St. Petersburg, 1902 (volume 1), 1903 (volume 2). Reprints: 1994, 1997 ("Terra" publishing house). Continuation and significant expansion of the dictionary Current and apt words. Articles (over 11000 in total) contain foreign analogues of Russian catchphrases, phraseology, proverbs, etc. The dictionary includes a powerful reference apparatus, including detailed alphabetical indexes (at the end of the book).
- Russian thought and speech: One's own and others'. Experience of Russian phraseology. Collection of figurative words and allegories. (1912)
  Русская мысль и речь: Свое и чужое. Опыт русской фразеологии. Сборник образных слов и иносказаний. [Russian thought and speech: One's own and others'. Experience of Russian phraseology. Collection of figurative words and allegories]. — St. Petersburg, 1912. Foreign material — quotes, proverbs, sayings in modern Western European, Latin and Greek — is omitted in this (posthumous) edition of the dictionary.

The Academy of Sciences awarded Michelson's dictionaries Current and apt words and Russian thought and speech. Experience of Russian phraseology the Metropolitan Macarius Prize.

== Michelson prize ==
Recognition — and with it royalties — came to Michelson late, in the last decade of his life. With the earnings from the two 1898 editions, Michelson established a prize in his name, awarded by the Department of Russian Language and Literature of the Academy of Sciences: "For works in the field of the science of the Russian language". Three prizes were awarded annually, in the amount of 1000, 500 and 300 rubles.

== Family ==
He was married first (10 February 1854) to the daughter of a collegiate secretary, Olga Feodosyevna Grigorieva (10 June 1837 – 9 October 1866). Their children:

- Zinaida (married Veselovskaya; 31 December 1851 – 1949, Nice)
- Olga (3 December 1857 – 1942)
- Nadezhda (Vera) Potapenko (25 June 1860, Saint Petersburg – 1924, Nice)
- Alexei (1 February 1861 – ?)
- Grigory (27 July 1864 – ?)
- Sergei (7 October 1865 – ?)

Second wife — Ottilia Pavlovna Holtzman (1849–1922), buried together with her husband at the Smolensky Lutheran Cemetery in Saint Petersburg.
