= Konstantin Dushenko =

Russian translator, culturologist and historian

Konstantin Vasilyevich Dushenko (Russian: Константин Васильевич Душенко; born 16 October 1946) is a Russian translator, culturologist and historian, with the Institute of Scientific Information on Social Sciences of the Russian Academy of Sciences. He authored over 30 books on the origins of various quotations, aphorisms, and bon mots.

He translated various literature from Polish, both works of fiction and scientific works. In particular, he translated many works of Stanisław Lem. For this was he was awarded with the Decoration of Honor Meritorious for Polish Culture.

Dushenko graduated first from the Moscow Tekhnikum of Automatics and Telemechanics and later from the Moscow State University, department of history. In 1977 he earned Ph.D. with the thesis about the ideology of Warsaw positivism ("Из истории польской буржуазной общественной мысли: Варшавский позитивизм в 1866—1886 гг.").

== Books ==
- Красное и белое: Из истории политического языка. — М.: ИНИОН РАН, 2018
- Цитата в пространстве культуры: Из истории цитат и крылатых слов. — М.: ИНИОН РАН, 2019.
- История знаменитых цитат. — М.: Азбука-Аттикус, 2018.
- Последние слова знаменитых людей: Легенды и факты. — М.: Эксмо, 2016.
- Большой словарь латинских цитат и выражений. / В соавторстве с Г. Ю. Багриновским. — 2-е изд., испр. и доп.— М.: Азбука-Аттикус, 2017.
- Большой словарь цитат и крылатых выражений. — М.: Эксмо, 2011.
- Всемирная история в изречениях и цитатах. — 2‑е изд., перераб. и доп. — М.: Эксмо, 2008.
- Русская история в изречениях и цитатах. — 2-е изд., перераб. и доп. — М.: Азбука-Аттикус, 2019. (В печати.)
- Мысли и изречения древних с указанием источника. — М.: Эксмо, 2003.
- Религия и этика в изречениях и цитатах. — М.: Эксмо, 2009.
- Словарь современных цитат. — 4-е изд., перераб. и доп. — М.: Эксмо, 2006.
- Цитаты из всемирной литературы от Гомера до наших дней. — М.: Эксмо, 2007.
- Цитаты из русской литературы от «Слова о полку…» до Пелевина. — 3‑е изд., испр. и доп. — М.: Азбука-Аттикус, 2019.
- «Большая книга афоризмов» (12-е изд.: М.: Эксмо, 2012; 13-е изд. под загл. "Большая книга мудрости и остроумия": М.: Эксмо, 2015).
- «Мастера афоризма от Возрождения до наших дней» (3-е изд.: М.: Эксмо, 2006),
- «Новая книга афоризмов» (М.: Эксмо, 2009)
- Оскар Уайльд. Мысли, афоризмы и фразы с указанием источника. (2-е изд.: М.: Эксмо, 2013).
