= Justin Alexander =

American author and game designer

Justin Alexander (born 1979) is an American role-playing game reviewer, critic, and designer who blogs and streams under the name The Alexandrian. He is known as the author of the book So You Want to Be a Game Master, for inventing the Three Clue Rule, and as a long time proponent of hexcrawl style adventures. He is the RPG Producer of Atlas Games, overseeing RPGs like Feng Shui, Unknown Armies, Ars Magica, Over the Edge, and Magical Kitties Save the Day.

== Biography ==
Justin grew up in Rochester Minnesota, raised by nationally bestselling novelist Gail Lynn "Margaret" Frazer. His first RPG writing job was for Heavy Gear, in 1998.

In 2015, he was hired as the Product Manager for Modiphius's Infinity RPG. Most recently, in 2018 he joined Atlas Games as their RPG Producer and Developer.

== Published works ==
His published works include more than 200 books, articles, and reviews including gaming supplements published by Modiphius Entertainment, Fantasy Flight Games, Dream Pod 9, Atlas Games, Troll Lord Games, and Dream Machine Productions. In November 2023, his book So You Want to Be a Game Master was released by Page Street Publishing and Macmillan, becoming a USA Today Bestselling Book.

== Recognition ==
Justin's website won a Silver Ennie Award in 2019.

In 2024, The Alexandrian won a Golden Ennie award for Best Online Content. Alexander's book So You Want to Be a Game Master won a Golden Ennie award for Best RPG Related Product.
