= 2015 Duck Commander 500 =

Race details
- Race 7 of 36 in the 2015 NASCAR Sprint Cup Series
- Date: April 11, 2015
- Location: Texas Motor Speedway in Fort Worth, Texas
- Course: Permanent racing facility
- Course length: 1.5 miles (2.4 km)
- Distance: 334 laps, 501 mi (801.6 km)
- Weather: Mostly cloudy with a temperature of 74 °F (23 °C); wind out of the south/southeast at 11 mph (18 km/h)
- Average speed: 140.500 mph (226.113 km/h)

Pole position
Driver	Kurt Busch	Stewart–Haas Racing
- Time: 27.857

Most laps led
Driver	Jimmie Johnson	Hendrick Motorsports
- Laps: 128

Winner
No. 48	Jimmie Johnson	Hendrick Motorsports

Television in the United States
- Network: Fox
- Announcers: Mike Joy, Larry McReynolds and Darrell Waltrip
- Nielsen ratings: 2.9/6 (Overnight); 2.9/6 (Final); 4.8 Million viewers

Radio in the United States
- Radio: PRN
- Booth announcers: Doug Rice, Mark Garrow and Wendy Venturini
- Turn announcers: Rob Albright (1 & 2) and Pat Patterson (3 & 4)

The 2015 Duck Commander 500 was a NASCAR Sprint Cup Series race held on April 11, 2015 at Texas Motor Speedway in Fort Worth, Texas. Contested over 334 laps on the 1.5 mi (2.4 km) quad-oval track, it was the seventh race of the 2015 NASCAR Sprint Cup Series. Jimmie Johnson won the race, his second win of the season and first in the Texas spring race, while Kevin Harvick finished second and Dale Earnhardt Jr. finished third. Joey Logano and Brad Keselowski rounded out the top five.

Kurt Busch won the pole and led 45 laps on his way to a 14th-place finish. Johnson led a race high of 128 laps, with 29 lead changes among nine different drivers, as well as eight caution flag periods for 40 laps.

This was the 72nd career victory for Johnson, his fifth at the track and the seventh for Hendrick Motorsports. This win moved Johnson up to sixth in the points standings, while Harvick left Texas with a 26-point lead over Logano. Chevrolet increased their lead in the manufacturers' championship to 19 points over Ford.

The Duck Commander 500 was by Fox Sports on the broadcast Fox network for the American television audience. The radio broadcast for the race was carried by the Performance Racing Network and Sirius XM NASCAR Radio.

== Report ==
=== Background ===
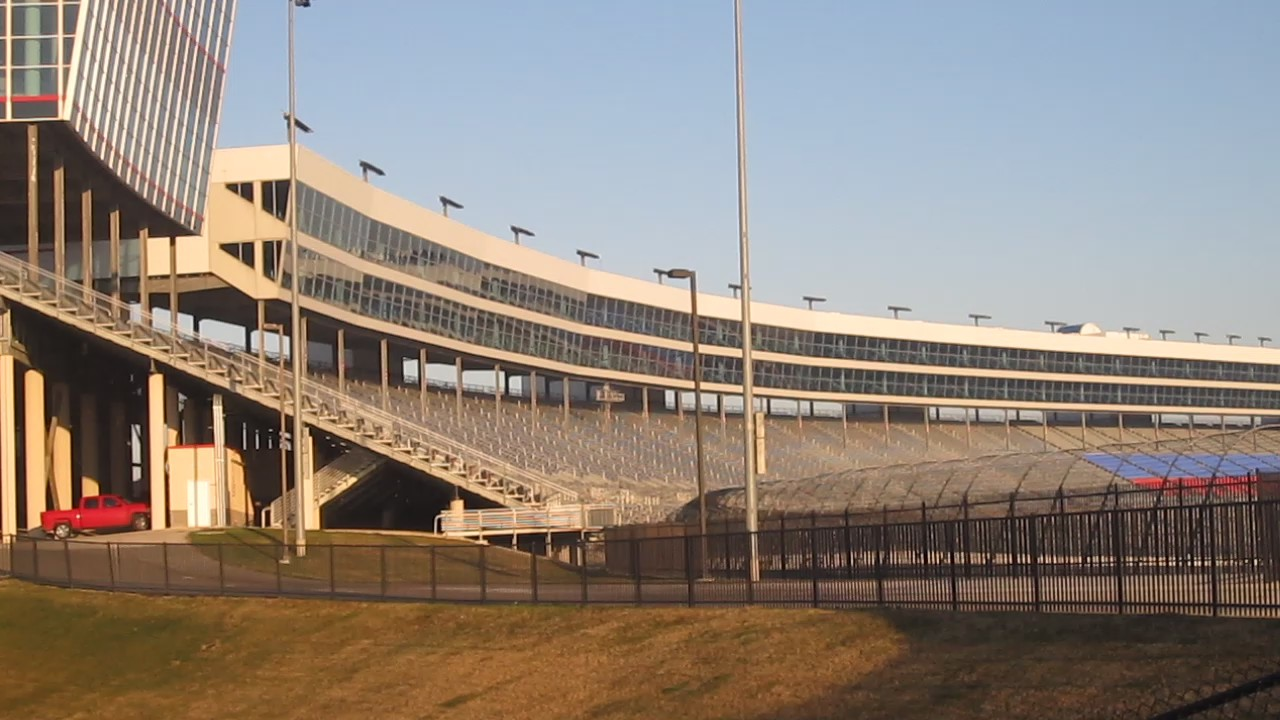
Texas Motor Speedway, the track where the race was held.

Texas Motor Speedway is a speedway located in the northernmost portion of the U.S. city of Fort Worth, Texas – the portion located in Denton County, Texas. The track measures 1.5 miles (2.4 km) around and is banked 24 degrees in the turns, and is of the oval design, where the front straightaway juts outward slightly. The track layout is similar to Atlanta Motor Speedway and Charlotte Motor Speedway, tracks also owned by Speedway Motorsports.

Kevin Harvick entered Texas with a 24-point lead over Joey Logano, while Martin Truex Jr. entered 32 points back in third. Brad Keselowski entered 57 points back in fourth, and Kasey Kahne entered 70 points back in fifth.

==== Entry list ====
No.	Driver	Team	Manufacturer
1	Jamie McMurray	Chip Ganassi Racing	Chevrolet
2	Brad Keselowski (PC3)	Team Penske	Ford
3	Austin Dillon	Richard Childress Racing	Chevrolet
4	Kevin Harvick (PC1)	Stewart–Haas Racing	Chevrolet
5	Kasey Kahne	Hendrick Motorsports	Chevrolet
6	Trevor Bayne	Roush Fenway Racing	Ford
7	Alex Bowman	Tommy Baldwin Racing	Chevrolet
9	Sam Hornish Jr.	Richard Petty Motorsports	Ford
10	Danica Patrick	Stewart–Haas Racing	Chevrolet
11	Denny Hamlin	Joe Gibbs Racing	Toyota
13	Casey Mears	Germain Racing	Chevrolet
14	Tony Stewart (PC4)	Stewart–Haas Racing	Chevrolet
15	Clint Bowyer	Michael Waltrip Racing	Toyota
16	Greg Biffle	Roush Fenway Racing	Ford
17	Ricky Stenhouse Jr.	Roush Fenway Racing	Ford
18	David Ragan	Joe Gibbs Racing	Toyota
19	Carl Edwards	Joe Gibbs Racing	Toyota
20	Matt Kenseth (PC6)	Joe Gibbs Racing	Toyota
21	Ryan Blaney (i)	Wood Brothers Racing	Ford
22	Joey Logano	Team Penske	Ford
23	J. J. Yeley (i)	BK Racing	Toyota
24	Jeff Gordon (PC7)	Hendrick Motorsports	Chevrolet
26	Jeb Burton (R)	BK Racing	Toyota
27	Paul Menard	Richard Childress Racing	Chevrolet
31	Ryan Newman	Richard Childress Racing	Chevrolet
32	Mike Bliss (i)	Go FAS Racing	Ford
33	Brian Scott (i)	Hillman–Circle Sport	Chevrolet
34	Chris Buescher (i)	Front Row Motorsports	Ford
35	Cole Whitt	Front Row Motorsports	Ford
38	David Gilliland	Front Row Motorsports	Ford
40	Landon Cassill (i)	Hillman–Circle Sport	Chevrolet
41	Kurt Busch (PC5)	Stewart–Haas Racing	Chevrolet
42	Kyle Larson	Chip Ganassi Racing	Chevrolet
43	Aric Almirola	Richard Petty Motorsports	Ford
46	Michael Annett	HScott Motorsports	Chevrolet
47	A. J. Allmendinger	JTG Daugherty Racing	Chevrolet
48	Jimmie Johnson (PC2)	Hendrick Motorsports	Chevrolet
51	Justin Allgaier	HScott Motorsports	Chevrolet
55	Brett Moffitt (R)	Michael Waltrip Racing	Toyota
62	Brendan Gaughan (i)	Premium Motorsports	Chevrolet
78	Martin Truex Jr.	Furniture Row Racing	Chevrolet
83	Matt DiBenedetto (R)	BK Racing	Toyota
88	Dale Earnhardt Jr.	Hendrick Motorsports	Chevrolet
95	Michael McDowell	Leavine Family Racing	Ford
98	Josh Wise	Phil Parsons Racing	Ford
Official initial entry list
Official updated entry list

Key	Meaning
(R)	Rookie
(i)	Ineligible for points
(PC#)	Past champions provisional

== Practice ==
=== First practice ===
Martin Truex Jr. was the fastest in the first practice session with a time of 28.258 and a speed of 191.096 mph (307.539 km/h).

Pos	No.	Driver	Team	Manufacturer	Time	Speed
1	78	Martin Truex Jr.	Furniture Row Racing	Chevrolet	28.258	191.096
2	5	Kasey Kahne	Hendrick Motorsports	Chevrolet	28.352	190.463
3	4	Kevin Harvick	Stewart–Haas Racing	Chevrolet	28.455	189.773
Official first practice results

=== Final practice ===
Kasey Kahne was the fastest in the final practice session with a time of 28.276 and a speed of 190.975 mph (307.344 km/h).

Pos	No.	Driver	Team	Manufacturer	Time	Speed
1	5	Kasey Kahne	Hendrick Motorsports	Chevrolet	28.276	190.975
2	48	Jimmie Johnson	Hendrick Motorsports	Chevrolet	28.343	190.523
3	1	Jamie McMurray	Chip Ganassi Racing	Chevrolet	28.473	189.653
Official final practice results

== Qualifying ==
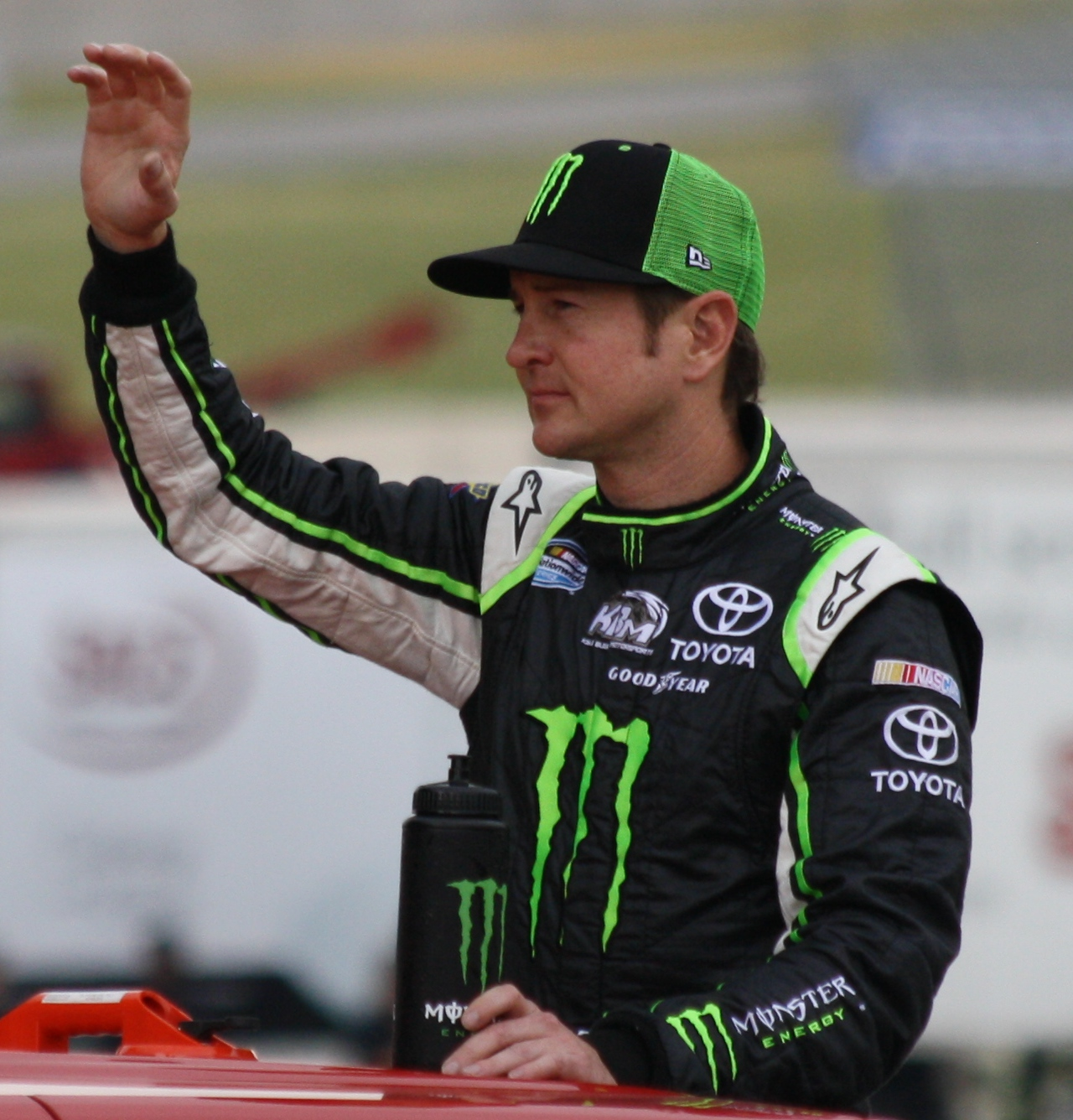
Kurt Busch, seen here in 2012 at Road America, won the pole for the race.

Kurt Busch won the pole with a time of 27.857 and a speed of 193.847 mph (311.967 km/h). After winning the pole, Busch thanked his entire team for the good result, stating that "everyone chipped in". Busch also stated that his second pole of the 2015 season felt good, and that he was looking "to dial it in and get that long-run speed out of the car". Championship leader and team-mate Kevin Harvick joined Busch on the front row, having been out-qualified by 0.018 seconds. Harvick felt that his team "stuck to our plan" and that "everything worked out good". In third place was Team Penske's Brad Keselowski, who stated that he was "being first in class", behind the cars of Busch and Harvick in the grid order. He also stated that "it never helps to have extra runs on the tires, but we made the most of it".

Keselowski's Penske team-mate Joey Logano qualified sixth, believing that his car was more suited to the race and that he "kind of finished as expected for qualifying". Logano also mentioned that his crew chief Todd Gordon had told him that he won from 10th last year, so that he was "improving". Dale Earnhardt Jr. failed to make it out of the first part of the qualifying session, and like Logano, he felt that his car would perform better in the race than in qualifying. In order to improve the car, Earnhardt stated that he and his team "will have to go home and work on it". With 45 entrants, Jeb Burton and Brendan Gaughan both failed to qualify.

=== Qualifying results ===
Pos	No.	Driver	Team	Manufacturer	R1	R2	R3
1	41	Kurt Busch	Stewart–Haas Racing	Chevrolet	27.879	27.885	27.857
2	4	Kevin Harvick	Stewart–Haas Racing	Chevrolet	27.752	27.832	27.875
3	2	Brad Keselowski	Team Penske	Ford	28.051	27.974	27.951
4	5	Kasey Kahne	Hendrick Motorsports	Chevrolet	28.005	28.024	27.989
5	48	Jimmie Johnson	Hendrick Motorsports	Chevrolet	28.099	28.071	28.063
6	22	Joey Logano	Team Penske	Ford	28.037	28.024	28.071
7	31	Ryan Newman (Note: Ryan Newman started from the rear after changing engines post-qualifying because of valve-train issues.)	Richard Childress Racing	Chevrolet	28.079	28.007	28.088
8	27	Paul Menard	Richard Childress Racing	Chevrolet	27.914	27.963	28.109
9	42	Kyle Larson	Chip Ganassi Racing	Chevrolet	27.837	27.924	28.118
10	1	Jamie McMurray	Chip Ganassi Racing	Chevrolet	28.033	28.002	28.166
11	14	Tony Stewart	Stewart–Haas Racing	Chevrolet	27.906	28.072	28.200
12	24	Jeff Gordon	Hendrick Motorsports	Chevrolet	27.695	28.052	28.489
13	21	Ryan Blaney (i)	Wood Brothers Racing	Ford	28.030	28.085	—
14	3	Austin Dillon	Richard Childress Racing	Chevrolet	28.100	28.086	—
15	78	Martin Truex Jr.	Furniture Row Racing	Chevrolet	28.042	28.091	—
16	19	Carl Edwards	Joe Gibbs Racing	Toyota	28.060	28.129	—
17	20	Matt Kenseth	Joe Gibbs Racing	Toyota	28.102	28.137	—
18	11	Denny Hamlin	Joe Gibbs Racing	Toyota	28.018	28.142	—
19	16	Greg Biffle	Roush Fenway Racing	Ford	28.002	28.159	—
20	13	Casey Mears	Germain Racing	Chevrolet	27.967	28.210	—
21	10	Danica Patrick	Stewart–Haas Racing	Chevrolet	28.049	28.258	—
22	17	Ricky Stenhouse Jr.	Roush Fenway Racing	Ford	28.054	28.290	—
23	6	Trevor Bayne	Roush Fenway Racing	Ford	28.012	28.343	—
24	51	Justin Allgaier	HScott Motorsports	Chevrolet	28.099	28.349	—
25	88	Dale Earnhardt Jr.	Hendrick Motorsports	Chevrolet	28.115	—	—
26	47	A. J. Allmendinger	JTG Daugherty Racing	Chevrolet	28.130	—	—
27	15	Clint Bowyer	Michael Waltrip Racing	Toyota	28.178	—	—
28	46	Michael Annett	HScott Motorsports	Chevrolet	28.194	—	—
29	9	Sam Hornish Jr.	Richard Petty Motorsports	Ford	28.201	—	—
30	18	David Ragan	Joe Gibbs Racing	Toyota	28.205	—	—
31	35	Cole Whitt	Front Row Motorsports	Ford	28.218	—	—
32	43	Aric Almirola	Richard Petty Motorsports	Ford	28.222	—	—
33	40	Landon Cassill (i)	Hillman–Circle Sport	Chevrolet	28.222	—	—
34	7	Alex Bowman	Tommy Baldwin Racing	Chevrolet	28.236	—	—
35	98	Josh Wise	Phil Parsons Racing	Ford	28.275	—	—
36	55	Brett Moffitt (R)	Michael Waltrip Racing	Toyota	28.288	—	—
37	32	Mike Bliss (i)	Go FAS Racing	Ford	28.367	—	—
38	38	David Gilliland	Front Row Motorsports	Ford	28.378	—	—
39	95	Michael McDowell	Leavine Family Racing	Ford	28.383	—	—
40	34	Chris Buescher (i)	Front Row Motorsports	Ford	28.517	—	—
41	23	J. J. Yeley (i)	BK Racing	Toyota	28.621	—	—
42	83	Matt DiBenedetto (R)	BK Racing	Toyota	28.758	—	—
43	33	Alex Kennedy (R)	Hillman–Circle Sport	Chevrolet	29.072	—	—
Failed to qualify
44	62	Brendan Gaughan (i)	Premium Motorsports	Chevrolet	28.417	—	—
45	26	Jeb Burton (R)	BK Racing	Toyota	28.495	—	—
Official qualifying results

== Race ==
=== First-half ===
==== Start ====
The race was scheduled to start at 7:46 p.m., but started a couple of minutes later when Kurt Busch led the field to the green flag. He would not maintain the lead, however, as his teammate Kevin Harvick passed him exiting turn 4 on the opening lap. Engine issues were prevalent in the opening stages of the race, as J. J. Yeley took his car to the garage on lap 13 because of engine issues, and Ryan Blaney also reported that his engine was sputtering. The first caution of the race flew on lap 32 when Alex Kennedy spun out in turn 4 after he got loose in turn 3. Kurt Busch exited pit road ahead of Harvick to take the lead, while Justin Allgaier was forced to restart from the tail end for a commitment line violation. Dale Earnhardt Jr. made a second stop under the caution to add lug nuts to the left-rear of his car – instead of the normal five, the tire had only two.

The race restarted on lap 37 with Busch out front. Harvick took the lead by the end of the lap, before Busch was able to get back to the front. Brad Keselowski, running fourth at the time, made an unscheduled stop on lap 67 and dropped to 30th. Blaney retired from the race on lap 71, as his engine issues continued. Kyle Larson kicked off a wave of green flag pit stops on lap 79. Busch surrendered the lead on lap 81 to make his stop and Jeff Gordon assumed the lead. Gordon pitted the next lap and the lead cycled to Keselowski, following his unscheduled pit stop. Ricky Stenhouse Jr. was forced to serve a drive-through penalty for speeding on pit road. Jimmie Johnson took the lead on lap 109, just as debris in turn 3 brought out the second caution of the race. Johnson and Harvick swapped the lead on pit road with Johnson maintaining the lead on exit. Denny Hamlin was forced to drop to the tail end of the field for driving through too many pit boxes exiting pit road.

==== Green flag run ====
The race restarted on lap 114 with Johnson in the lead. Kevin Harvick took back the lead on lap 125, and led the next portion of the race before Johnson took back the lead on lap 156, just as cars began hitting pit road for green flag pit stops. Johnson and Harvick swapped the lead over the next few laps, before Harvick ceded his position for a stop and Kasey Kahne assumed the position. Kahne spent two laps at the front of the race, before Johnson cycled back to the head of the field on lap 160. Landon Cassill made an unscheduled stop on lap 167 for a flat tire, almost hitting the wall in turn 4.

=== Second-half ===
==== Halfway ====
Debris in turn 3 brought out the third caution of the race on lap 169. Johnson and Harvick swapped the lead on pit road being pitted on opposite ends, but it was Johnson that exited with the lead. The race restarted on lap 177. Kahne, running eighth, made an unscheduled stop for a loose wheel on lap 198, and rejoined the race in 22nd position. Johnson gave up the lead on lap 220 to make his stop, handing the lead to Paul Menard. He led a lap before the lead went to Kahne, after his unscheduled pit stop. Johnson passed him on fresher tires on lap 226, and held the lead to the fourth caution of the race, which flew on lap 227 when Matt Kenseth just about spun out in turn 4. Johnson and Harvick again swapped the lead on pit road with Johnson again leaving with the lead for the restart, with 100 laps to go.

==== Bad night for HScott Motorsports ====
The fifth caution of the race flew with 86 laps to go when Michael Annett hit the wall in turn 2. Just as in the previous pit stop cycle, Johnson and Harvick swapped the lead on pit road with Johnson exiting with the lead. Trevor Bayne was forced to restart at the tail end for driving through too many pit boxes exiting pit road. The race restarted with 79 laps to go, but was soon back under yellow flag conditions – for the sixth time, with 75 laps to go – after Allgaier hit the wall in turn 2. After an extensive clean up of oil on pit road, a number of drivers stayed out – led by Joey Logano – while Johnson pitted. Keselowski was forced to drop to the tail end of the field for a commitment violation, while Stenhouse was forced to drop to the tail end of the field for his crew being over the wall too soon.

==== Final 100 miles ====
The race restarted with 65 laps to go with Logano in the lead. Kevin Harvick retook the lead with 49 laps to go, before debris in turn 3 brought out the seventh caution of the race as Kenseth hit the wall with 41 laps to go. The race restarted with 35 laps to go, before more debris brought out the eighth caution of the race as A. J. Allmendinger hit the wall with 25 laps to go. Jamie McMurray exited pit road with the lead by taking just two tires, while Kyle Larson and Casey Mears were forced to drop to the tail end of the field for driving through too many pit boxes.

===== Finish =====
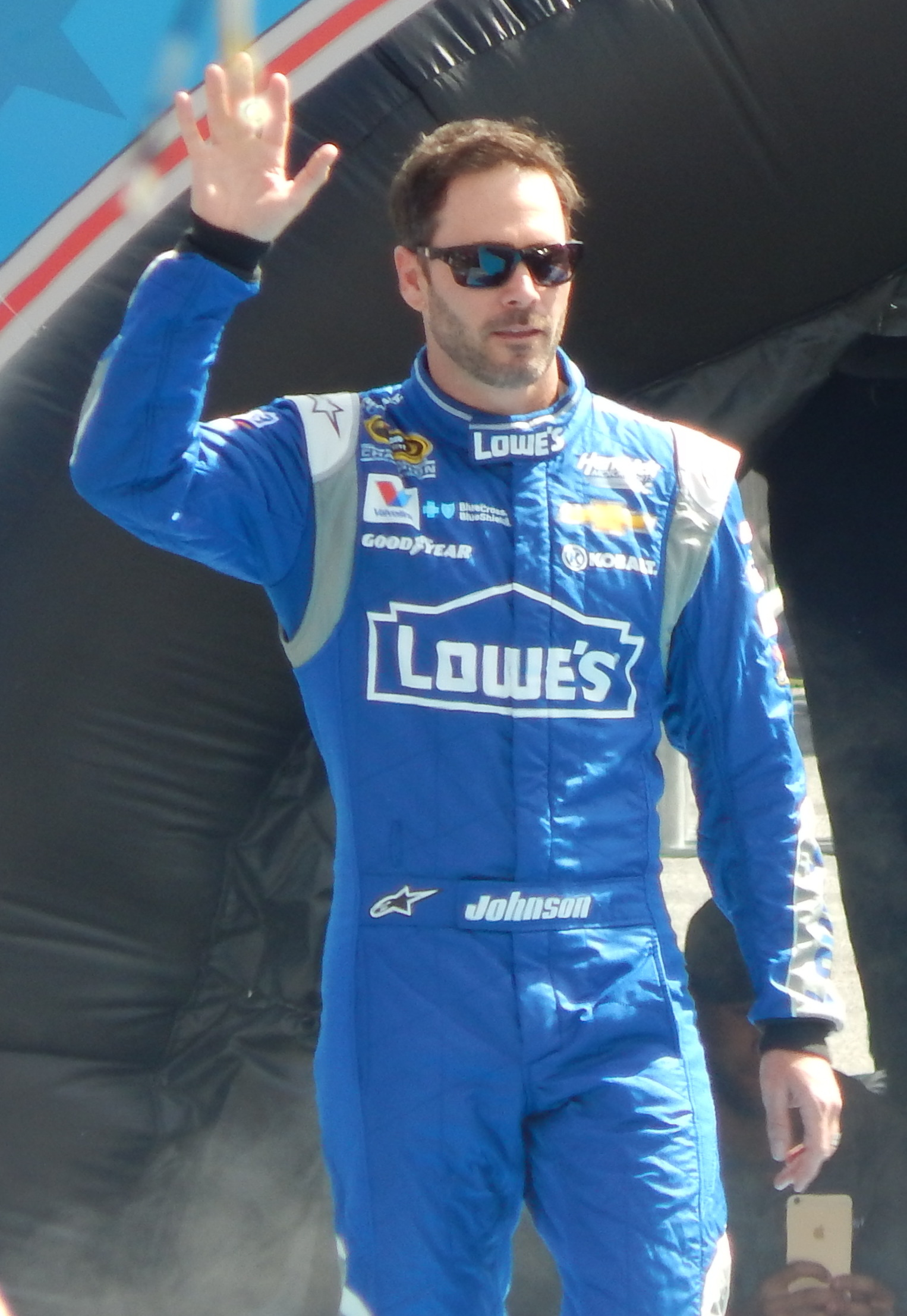
Jimmie Johnson, seen here at the 2015 Daytona 500, scored his 72nd career win at Texas Motor Speedway.

The race restarted with 21 laps to go. Joey Logano was bumped out of the way by Kevin Harvick in turn 1 and managed to avoid hitting the wall, but fell back to eighth in the running order. Harvick stated post-race that the incident was "the chance you take when you block" and that a driver would "just have to kind of knock them out of the way". Logano felt that the move was "understandable" and that he expected "to get raced the way I race people, and I would do the same thing". Johnson took the lead from McMurray with 14 laps to go, and was able to hold off Harvick – who had been closing in after the Logano incident – to score the victory.

== Post-race ==
=== Driver comments ===
In Victory Lane, Johnson reflected upon his 72nd win in the series, describing his Chevrolet as "a great, great racecar", and that it was the perfect result after the Easter break, stating that it "was good for us, gave us a chance to reboot, relax and get back in the swing of things". After his second-place finish, Harvick stated that he was "not disappointed at all", adding that "racing for wins is what we're here to do". Gordon, who gambled on the final pit stop by changing just two tires, restarted second and scored a seventh-place finish – his best of the season. Gordon felt that he "struggled" during the race, but also praised his crew chief Alan Gustafson for a "great gamble". Truex, who had only five top ten finishes in 2014, scored his seventh top ten finish of 2015 with a ninth-place finish. Truex described the evening as "a hard-fought night, for sure" but also stated the result was "still a top 10, so all in all, it was a good night for us".

== Race results ==
Pos	No.	Driver	Team	Manufacturer	Laps	Points
1	48	Jimmie Johnson	Hendrick Motorsports	Chevrolet	334	48
2	4	Kevin Harvick	Stewart–Haas Racing	Chevrolet	334	43
3	88	Dale Earnhardt Jr.	Hendrick Motorsports	Chevrolet	334	41
4	22	Joey Logano	Team Penske	Ford	334	41
5	2	Brad Keselowski	Team Penske	Ford	334	40
6	1	Jamie McMurray	Chip Ganassi Racing	Chevrolet	334	39
7	24	Jeff Gordon	Hendrick Motorsports	Chevrolet	334	38
8	5	Kasey Kahne	Hendrick Motorsports	Chevrolet	334	37
9	78	Martin Truex Jr.	Furniture Row Racing	Chevrolet	334	35
10	19	Carl Edwards	Joe Gibbs Racing	Toyota	334	34
11	11	Denny Hamlin	Joe Gibbs Racing	Toyota	334	33
12	31	Ryan Newman	Richard Childress Racing	Chevrolet	334	32
13	18	David Ragan	Joe Gibbs Racing	Toyota	334	31
14	41	Kurt Busch	Stewart–Haas Racing	Chevrolet	334	31
15	17	Ricky Stenhouse Jr.	Roush Fenway Racing	Ford	334	29
16	10	Danica Patrick	Stewart–Haas Racing	Chevrolet	334	28
17	16	Greg Biffle	Roush Fenway Racing	Ford	334	27
18	6	Trevor Bayne	Roush Fenway Racing	Ford	334	26
19	43	Aric Almirola	Richard Petty Motorsports	Ford	334	25
20	3	Austin Dillon	Richard Childress Racing	Chevrolet	334	24
21	47	A. J. Allmendinger	JTG Daugherty Racing	Chevrolet	334	23
22	15	Clint Bowyer	Michael Waltrip Racing	Toyota	334	22
23	20	Matt Kenseth	Joe Gibbs Racing	Toyota	334	21
24	14	Tony Stewart	Stewart–Haas Racing	Chevrolet	334	20
25	42	Kyle Larson	Chip Ganassi Racing	Chevrolet	334	19
26	9	Sam Hornish Jr.	Richard Petty Motorsports	Ford	334	18
27	13	Casey Mears	Germain Racing	Chevrolet	333	17
28	38	David Gilliland	Front Row Motorsports	Ford	333	16
29	55	Brett Moffitt (R)	Michael Waltrip Racing	Toyota	333	15
30	34	Chris Buescher (i)	Front Row Motorsports	Ford	332	0
31	95	Michael McDowell	Leavine Family Racing	Ford	332	13
32	40	Landon Cassill (i)	Hillman–Circle Sport	Chevrolet	332	0
33	7	Alex Bowman	Tommy Baldwin Racing	Chevrolet	330	11
34	83	Matt DiBenedetto (R)	BK Racing	Toyota	330	10
35	35	Cole Whitt	Front Row Motorsports	Ford	330	9
36	32	Mike Bliss (i)	Go FAS Racing	Ford	328	0
37	33	Alex Kennedy (R)	Hillman–Circle Sport	Chevrolet	325	7
38	98	Josh Wise	Phil Parsons Racing	Ford	284	6
39	51	Justin Allgaier	HScott Motorsports	Chevrolet	257	5
40	46	Michael Annett	HScott Motorsports	Chevrolet	246	4
41	27	Paul Menard	Richard Childress Racing	Chevrolet	222	4
42	21	Ryan Blaney (i)	Wood Brothers Racing	Ford	71	0
43	23	J. J. Yeley (i)	BK Racing	Toyota	13	0
Official Duck Commander 500 results

=== Race statistics ===
- 29 lead changes among 9 different drivers
- 8 cautions for 40 laps
- Time of race: 3 hours, 33 minutes, 57 seconds
- Average speed: 140.500 mph (226.113 km/h)
- Jimmie Johnson took home $523,501 in winnings

Lap Leaders
Laps	Leader
1–33	Kevin Harvick
34–36	Kurt Busch
37	Kevin Harvick
38–79	Kurt Busch
80–81	Jeff Gordon
82–108	Brad Keselowski
109	Jimmie Johnson
110	Kevin Harvick
111–124	Jimmie Johnson
125–155	Kevin Harvick
156	Jimmie Johnson
157	Kevin Harvick
158–159	Kasey Kahne
160–172	Jimmie Johnson
173	Kevin Harvick
174–220	Jimmie Johnson
221	Paul Menard
222–225	Kasey Kahne
226–228	Jimmie Johnson
229	Kevin Harvick
230–250	Jimmie Johnson
251	Kevin Harvick
252–265	Jimmie Johnson
266–284	Joey Logano
285–310	Kevin Harvick
311–312	Jamie McMurray
313	Jeff Gordon
314–320	Jamie McMurray
321–334	Jimmie Johnson

Total laps led
Leader	Laps
Jimmie Johnson	128
Kevin Harvick	96
Kurt Busch	45
Brad Keselowski	27
Joey Logano	19
Jamie McMurray	9
Kasey Kahne	6
Jeff Gordon	3
Paul Menard	1

==== Race awards ====
- Coors Light Pole Award: Kurt Busch (27.857, 193.847 mph (311.967 km/h))
- 3M Lap Leader: Jimmie Johnson (128 laps)
- American Ethanol Green Flag Restart Award: Kevin Harvick (29.877, 180.744 mph (290.879 km/h))
- Duralast Brakes "Bake In The Race" Award: Kevin Harvick
- Freescale "Wide Open": Kevin Harvick
- Ingersoll Rand Power Move: Ryan Newman, 10 positions
- MAHLE Clevite Engine Builder of the Race: Hendrick Engines, #48
- Mobil 1 Driver of the Race: Jimmie Johnson (137.5 driver rating)
- Moog Steering and Suspension Problem Solver of The Race: Dale Earnhardt Jr. (crew chief Greg Ives (0.431 seconds))
- NASCAR Sprint Cup Leader Bonus: No winner: rolls over to $40,000 at next event
- Sherwin-Williams Fastest Lap: Jamie McMurray (Lap 315, 28.889, 186.924 mph (300.825 km/h))
- Sunoco Rookie of The Race: Brett Moffitt

== Media ==
=== Television ===
Fox Sports covered their 15th race at Texas Motor Speedway. Mike Joy, Larry McReynolds and Darrell Waltrip had the call in the booth for the race. Jamie Little, Chris Neville, and Matt Yocum handled the pit road duties for the television side.

Fox
Booth announcers	Pit reporters
Lap-by-lap: Mike Joy; Color-commentator: Larry McReynolds; Color commentator: Darrell Waltrip	Jamie Little; Chris Neville; Matt Yocum

=== Radio ===
PRN had the radio call for the race, which was simulcast on Sirius XM NASCAR Radio. Doug Rice, Mark Garrow and Wendy Venturini called the race in the booth when the field was racing down the front stretch. Rob Albright called the race from atop the condo outside turn 2 when the field was racing through turns 1 and 2. Pat Patterson called the race from a billboard outside turn 3 when the field was racing through turns 3 and 4. Brad Gillie, Brett McMillan, Jim Noble and Steve Richards worked pit road for PRN.

PRN
Booth announcers	Turn announcers	Pit reporters
Lead announcer: Doug Rice; Announcer: Mark Garrow; Announcer: Wendy Venturini	Turns 1 & 2: Rob Albright; Turns 3 & 4: Pat Patterson	Brad Gillie; Brett McMillan; Jim Noble; Steve Richards

== Standings after the race ==
Drivers' Championship standings

	Pos	Driver	Points
	1	Kevin Harvick	306
	2	Joey Logano	280 (−26)
	3	Martin Truex Jr.	266 (−40)
	4	Brad Keselowski	246 (−60)
	5	Kasey Kahne	230 (−76)
4	6	Jimmie Johnson	216 (−90)
1	7	Dale Earnhardt Jr.	213 (−93)
1	8	Denny Hamlin	205 (−101)
	9	Aric Almirola	195 (−111)
2	10	David Ragan	194 (−112)
3	11	Jamie McMurray	193 (−113)
1	12	Matt Kenseth	189 (−117)
3	13	Jeff Gordon	186 (−120)
3	14	Carl Edwards	182 (−124)
2	15	Casey Mears	178 (−128)
10	16	Paul Menard	177 (−129)

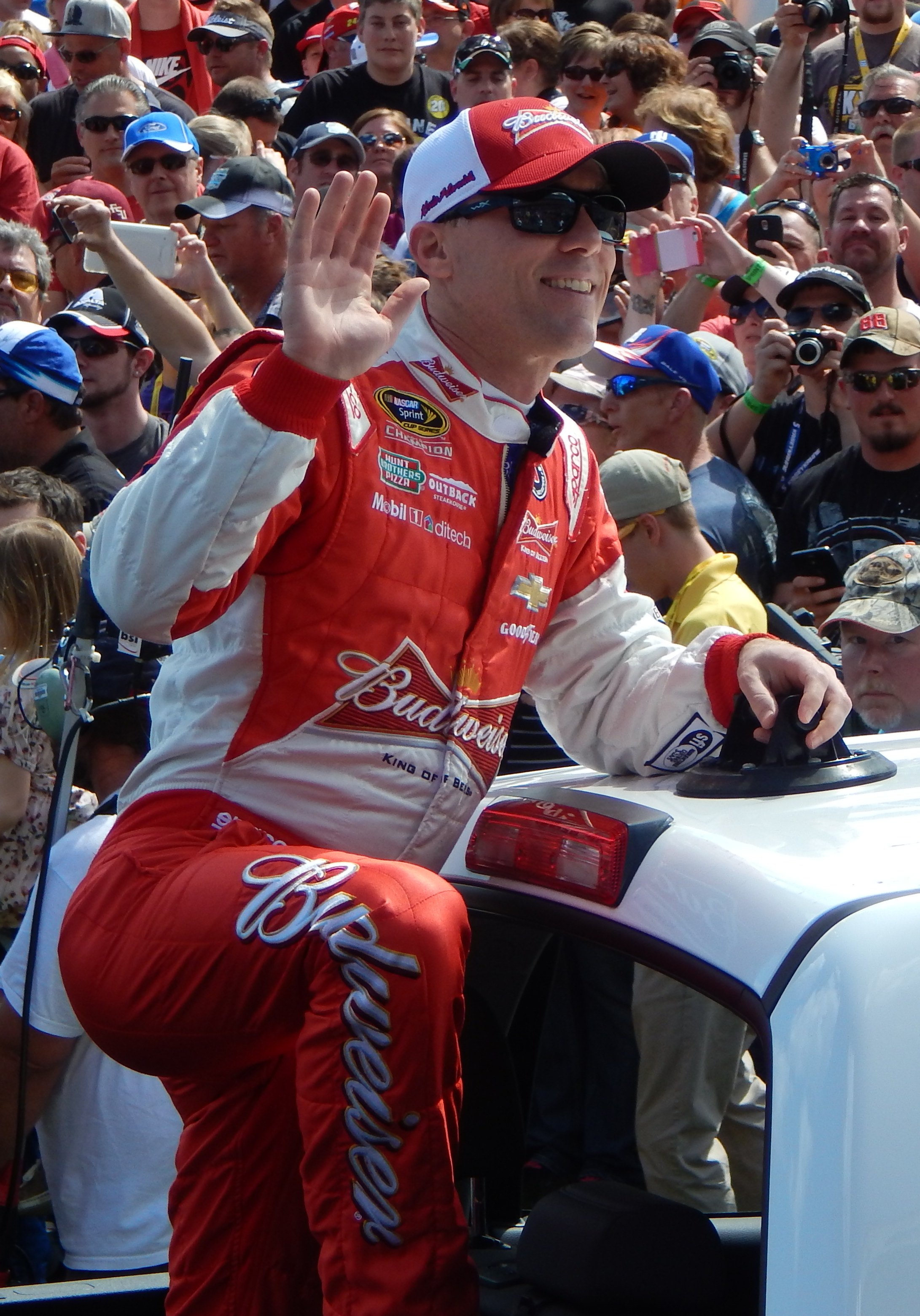
Kevin Harvick left Texas with a 26-point lead over Joey Logano.

Manufacturers' Championship standings

Pos	Manufacturer	Points
1	Chevrolet	315
2	Ford	296 (−19)
3	Toyota	264 (−51)

- Note: Only the first sixteen positions are included for the driver standings.

== Notes ==
Previous race: 2015 STP 500	Sprint Cup Series; 2015 season	Next race: 2015 Food City 500
