= 2015 STP 500 =

Race details
- Race 6 of 36 in the 2015 NASCAR Sprint Cup Series
- Layout of the track
- Date: March 29, 2015
- Location: Martinsville Speedway in Ridgeway, Virginia
- Course: Permanent racing facility
- Course length: 0.526 miles (0.847 km)
- Distance: 500 laps, 263 mi (423.257 km)
- Weather: Sunny, clear blue skies with a temperature of 45 °F (7 °C); wind out of the west/northwest at 1 mph (1.6 km/h)
- Average speed: 68.843 mph (110.792 km/h)

Pole position
Driver	Joey Logano	Team Penske
- Time: 19.232

Most laps led
Driver	Kevin Harvick	Stewart–Haas Racing
- Laps: 154

Winner
No. 11	Denny Hamlin	Joe Gibbs Racing

Television in the United States
- Network: Fox Sports 1
- Announcers: Mike Joy, Larry McReynolds and Darrell Waltrip
- Nielsen ratings: 2.5/4 (Overnight); 2.8/5 (Final); 4.061 Million viewers

Radio in the United States
- Radio: MRN
- Booth announcers: Joe Moore, Jeff Striegle and Rusty Wallace
- Turn announcers: Dave Moody (Backstretch)

The 2015 STP 500 was a NASCAR Sprint Cup Series race held on March 29, 2015, at Martinsville Speedway in Ridgeway, Virginia. Contested over 500 laps on the 0.526 miles (0.847 km) paperclip shaped short track, it was the sixth race of the 2015 NASCAR Sprint Cup Series season. Denny Hamlin won the race while Brad Keselowski finished runner-up. Joey Logano, Matt Kenseth and David Ragan rounded out the top five.

Joey Logano won the pole for the race and led 91 laps on his way to a third-place finish. Kevin Harvick led the most laps – leading 154 – on his way to an eighth-place finish, ending an eight consecutive race streak of finishing first or second. The race had 31 lead changes among 13 different drivers, as well as 16 caution flag periods for 112 laps.

Hamlin's 25th career victory was his fifth win at Martinsville Speedway and the eighth at the track for Joe Gibbs Racing. The win moved Hamlin up to eighth in the points standings, which were still headed by Harvick; he left Martinsville with a 24-point lead over Logano. Despite being the winning manufacturer, Toyota still trailed Chevrolet by 37 points in the manufacturers' standings, in third place.

The STP 500 was carried by Fox Sports on the cable/satellite Fox Sports 1 network for the American television audience – the first scheduled points race to air on the channel. The radio broadcast for the race was carried by the Motor Racing Network and Sirius XM NASCAR Radio.

This race marked the Cup Series debut of 2020 Series Champion Chase Elliott.

== Report ==
=== Background ===
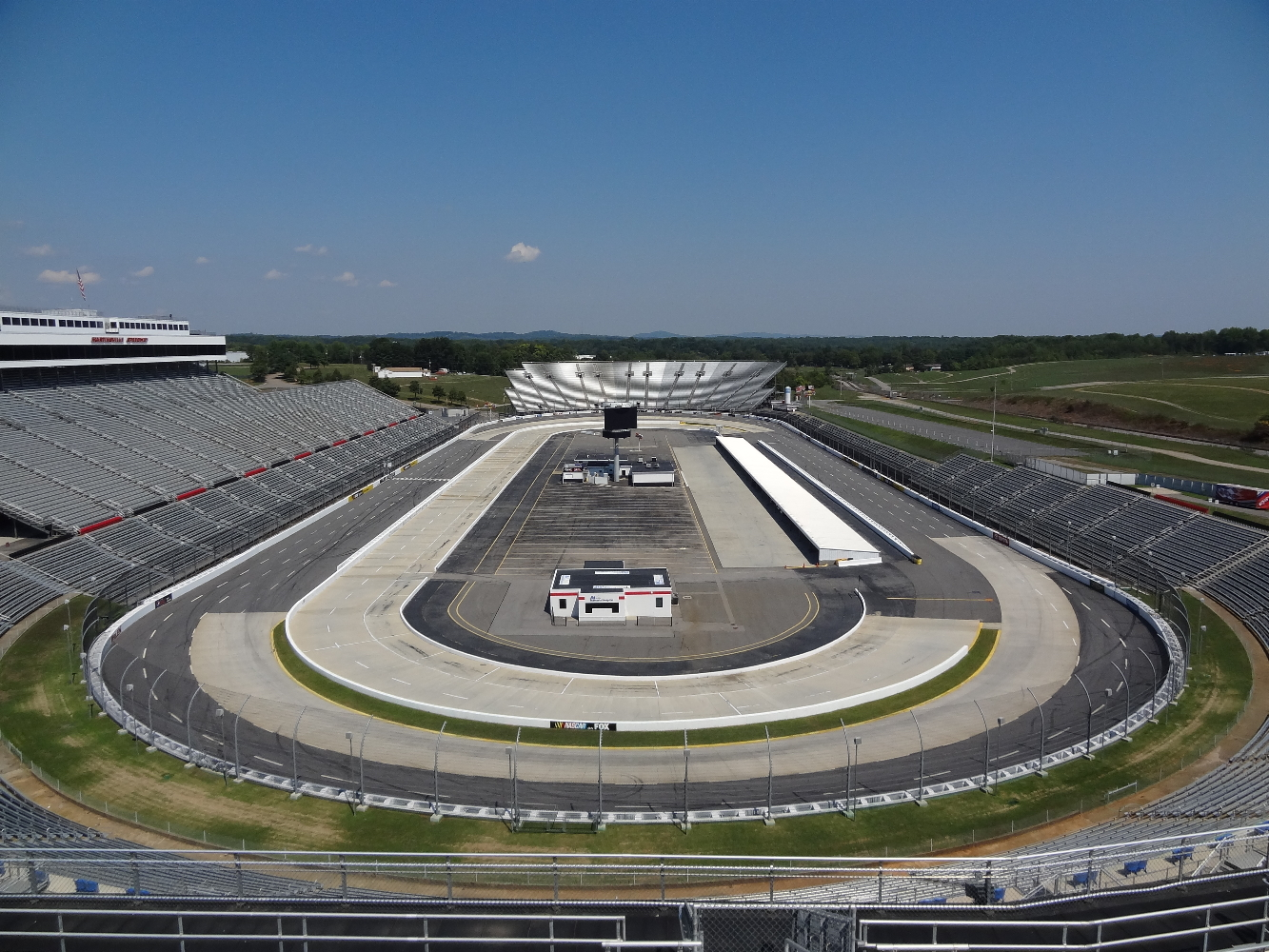
Martinsville Speedway, the race track where the race was held.

Martinsville Speedway is an International Speedway Corporation-owned NASCAR stock car racing track located in Henry County, in Ridgeway, Virginia, just to the south of Martinsville. At 0.526 miles (0.847 km) in length, it is the shortest track in the NASCAR Sprint Cup Series. The track was also one of the first paved oval tracks in NASCAR, being built in 1947 by H. Clay Earles. It is also the only remaining race track that has been on the NASCAR circuit from its beginning in 1948.

Kevin Harvick entered Martinsville with a 28-point lead over Joey Logano following his eighth consecutive top-two finish, while Martin Truex Jr. entered 33 points back in third. Dale Earnhardt Jr. entered 61 points back in fourth, a point ahead of Brad Keselowski in fifth.

==== Changes to the track ====
Following the lead of other tracks in the wake of Kyle Busch's wreck in the previous month's Xfinity Series Alert Today Florida 300 at Daytona International Speedway, Martinsville Speedway president Clay Campbell announced that tire barrier packs would be installed at the end of the backstretch inside wall prior to the entrance of pit road, for "the continued safety of the drivers and our fans".

==== Tire reduction ====
For the race weekend at Martinsville, NASCAR reduced the number of tire sets that Sprint Cup teams were allotted, from eleven to ten. Martinsville was the first of several races in 2015 to have a reduction in tire sets, as a cost-cutting measure, with tire sets costing teams up to two thousand dollars.

==== Entry list ====
No.	Driver	Team	Manufacturer
1	Jamie McMurray	Chip Ganassi Racing	Chevrolet
2	Brad Keselowski (PC3)	Team Penske	Ford
3	Austin Dillon	Richard Childress Racing	Chevrolet
4	Kevin Harvick (PC1)	Stewart–Haas Racing	Chevrolet
5	Kasey Kahne	Hendrick Motorsports	Chevrolet
6	Trevor Bayne	Roush Fenway Racing	Ford
7	Alex Bowman	Tommy Baldwin Racing	Chevrolet
9	Sam Hornish Jr.	Richard Petty Motorsports	Ford
10	Danica Patrick	Stewart–Haas Racing	Chevrolet
11	Denny Hamlin	Joe Gibbs Racing	Toyota
13	Casey Mears	Germain Racing	Chevrolet
14	Tony Stewart (PC4)	Stewart–Haas Racing	Chevrolet
15	Clint Bowyer	Michael Waltrip Racing	Toyota
16	Greg Biffle	Roush Fenway Racing	Ford
17	Ricky Stenhouse Jr.	Roush Fenway Racing	Ford
18	David Ragan	Joe Gibbs Racing	Toyota
19	Carl Edwards	Joe Gibbs Racing	Toyota
20	Matt Kenseth (PC6)	Joe Gibbs Racing	Toyota
22	Joey Logano	Team Penske	Ford
23	J. J. Yeley (i)	BK Racing	Toyota
24	Jeff Gordon (PC7)	Hendrick Motorsports	Chevrolet
25	Chase Elliott (i)	Hendrick Motorsports	Chevrolet
26	Jeb Burton (R)	BK Racing	Toyota
27	Paul Menard	Richard Childress Racing	Chevrolet
30	Ron Hornaday Jr.	The Motorsports Group	Chevrolet
31	Ryan Newman	Richard Childress Racing	Chevrolet
32	Mike Bliss (i)	Go FAS Racing	Ford
33	Alex Kennedy (R)	Hillman–Circle Sport	Chevrolet
34	Chris Buescher (i)	Front Row Motorsports	Ford
35	Cole Whitt	Front Row Motorsports	Ford
38	David Gilliland	Front Row Motorsports	Ford
40	Landon Cassill (i)	Hillman–Circle Sport	Chevrolet
41	Kurt Busch (PC5)	Stewart–Haas Racing	Chevrolet
42	Kyle Larson	Chip Ganassi Racing	Chevrolet
43	Aric Almirola	Richard Petty Motorsports	Ford
46	Michael Annett	HScott Motorsports	Chevrolet
47	A. J. Allmendinger	JTG Daugherty Racing	Chevrolet
48	Jimmie Johnson (PC2)	Hendrick Motorsports	Chevrolet
51	Justin Allgaier	HScott Motorsports	Chevrolet
55	Brett Moffitt (R)	Michael Waltrip Racing	Toyota
62	Brendan Gaughan (i)	Premium Motorsports	Chevrolet
78	Martin Truex Jr.	Furniture Row Racing	Chevrolet
83	Matt DiBenedetto (R)	BK Racing	Toyota
88	Dale Earnhardt Jr.	Hendrick Motorsports	Chevrolet
98	Josh Wise	Phil Parsons Racing	Ford
Official entry list

Key	Meaning
(R)	Rookie
(i)	Ineligible for points
(PC#)	Past champions provisional

== First practice ==
Ryan Newman was the fastest in the first practice session with a time of 19.355 and a speed of 97.835 mph (157.450 km/h). Chase Elliott, making his first ever Sprint Cup Series start, was 29th with a time of 19.656 and a speed of 96.337 mph (155.039 km/h). Elliott told reporters that the Sprint Cup Series "is a different world" and that "we're happy to be here". Late in the session, Austin Dillon's car went up in smoke, due to a fluid leak.

Pos	No.	Driver	Team	Manufacturer	Time	Speed
1	31	Ryan Newman	Richard Childress Racing	Chevrolet	19.355	97.835
2	47	A. J. Allmendinger	JTG Daugherty Racing	Chevrolet	19.386	97.679
3	24	Jeff Gordon	Hendrick Motorsports	Chevrolet	19.389	97.664
Official first practice results

== Qualifying ==
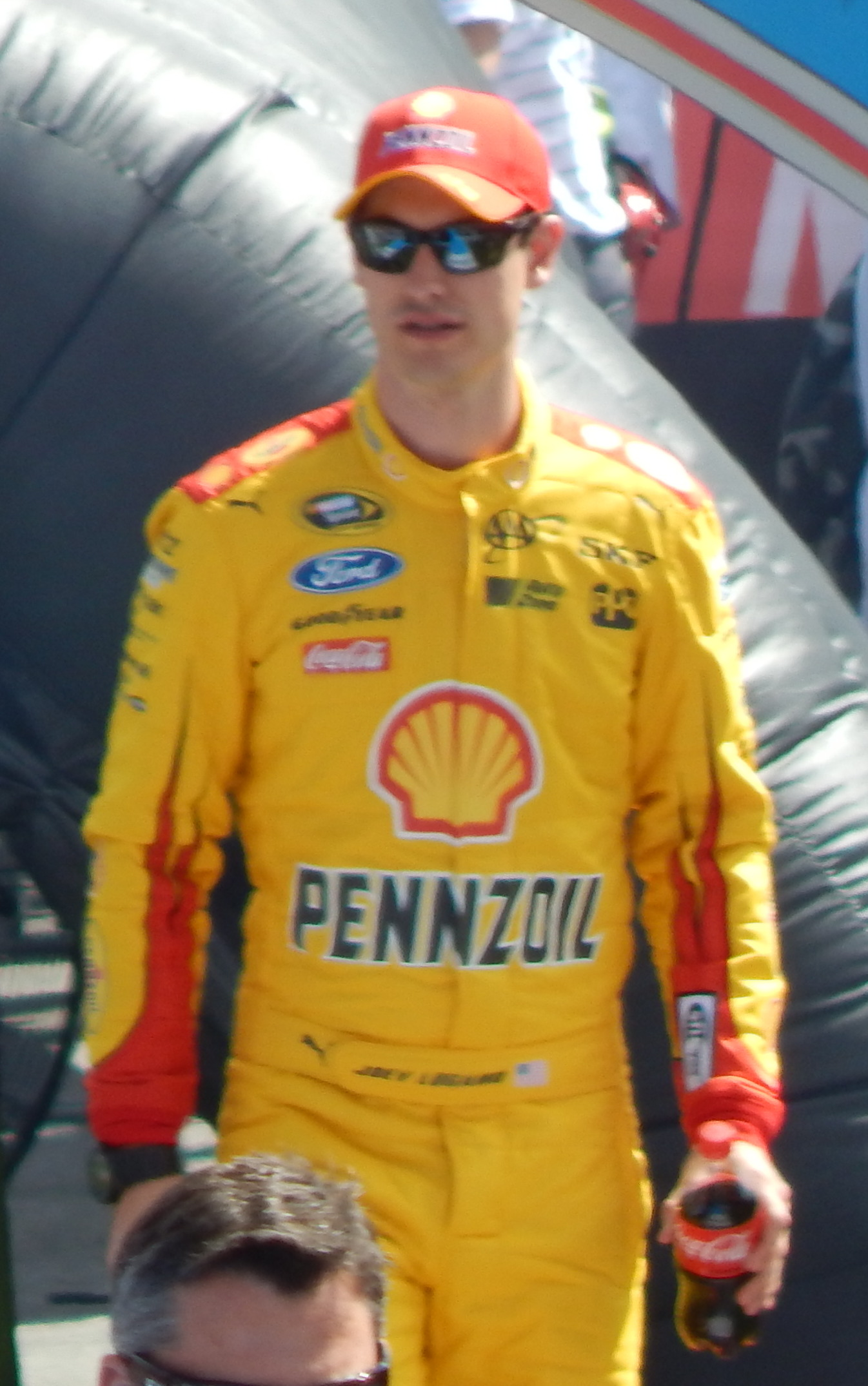
Joey Logano, seen here at the 2015 Daytona 500, won the pole for the STP 500.

Joey Logano won the pole with a time of 19.232 and a speed of 98.461 mph (158.458 km/h). Logano explained to reporters that he joked with his crew chief Todd Gordon about how many laps he could cover in the final session of qualifying; he stated that he "ran six and I told Todd I can't hold my breath any more than that so that's the fastest I can go", Ryan Newman joined Logano on the front row, but lamented the fact that he was not closer to Logano, stating that he "could have been just a tick quicker and gotten that pole", while also looking towards the race and the importance of pit stops during it.

Jimmie Johnson was also "excited" about his Hendrick Motorsports car, while qualifying fifth on the grid. He also elaborated that the car had "been real fast" and that "to have the car here starting in the top five with this much speed on Friday is awesome". Matt Kenseth qualified eighth, describing his first run as "okay", before further explaining that his car's "balance was pretty good and we were a little loose", and that "we just could never really get it any better on older tires". Chase Elliott qualified 27th on speed, and thus, ensured his place in the field for his maiden Sprint Cup Series start; he described the result as "definitely a big relief for us" and that he and his team were "excited for Sunday". Kurt Busch, the defending race winner, qualified just in front of Elliott, in 26th position. He described his car as "tight on corner exit" and that "it was like the rear end was planted too well". Brendan Gaughan and Ron Hornaday Jr. failed to qualify for the race.

=== Qualifying results ===
Pos	No.	Driver	Team	Manufacturer	R1	R2	R3
1	22	Joey Logano	Team Penske	Ford	19.345	19.395	19.232
2	31	Ryan Newman	Richard Childress Racing	Chevrolet	19.935	19.337	19.258
3	78	Martin Truex Jr.	Furniture Row Racing	Chevrolet	19.408	19.426	19.313
4	24	Jeff Gordon	Hendrick Motorsports	Chevrolet	19.453	19.369	19.399
5	48	Jimmie Johnson	Hendrick Motorsports	Chevrolet	19.377	19.384	19.405
6	14	Tony Stewart	Stewart–Haas Racing	Chevrolet	19.484	19.362	19.428
7	42	Kyle Larson (Note: Kyle Larson qualified the car, but after fainting the day before the race, he was not medically cleared to drive. Regan Smith drove in his place and started from the rear of the field for the driver change.)	Chip Ganassi Racing	Chevrolet	19.446	19.389	19.429
8	20	Matt Kenseth	Joe Gibbs Racing	Toyota	19.332	19.419	19.443
9	5	Kasey Kahne	Hendrick Motorsports	Chevrolet	19.411	19.418	19.465
10	47	A. J. Allmendinger	JTG Daugherty Racing	Chevrolet	19.424	19.381	19.469
11	19	Carl Edwards	Joe Gibbs Racing	Toyota	19.444	19.428	19.486
12	2	Brad Keselowski	Team Penske	Ford	19.447	19.394	19.514
13	27	Paul Menard	Richard Childress Racing	Chevrolet	19.458	19.444	—
14	88	Dale Earnhardt Jr.	Hendrick Motorsports	Chevrolet	19.464	19.461	—
15	11	Denny Hamlin	Joe Gibbs Racing	Toyota	19.443	19.468	—
16	10	Danica Patrick	Stewart–Haas Racing	Chevrolet	19.454	19.468	—
17	4	Kevin Harvick	Stewart–Haas Racing	Chevrolet	19.487	19.470	—
18	43	Aric Almirola	Richard Petty Motorsports	Ford	19.476	19.474	—
19	1	Jamie McMurray	Chip Ganassi Racing	Chevrolet	19.480	19.477	—
20	18	David Ragan	Joe Gibbs Racing	Toyota	19.484	19.562	—
21	51	Justin Allgaier (Note: Justin Allgaier started from the rear after switching to a backup car post-qualifying.)	HScott Motorsports	Chevrolet	19.473	19.564	—
22	3	Austin Dillon	Richard Childress Racing	Chevrolet	19.515	19.570	—
23	17	Ricky Stenhouse Jr.	Roush Fenway Racing	Ford	19.436	19.611	—
24	13	Casey Mears (Note: Casey Mears started from the rear for changing transmissions.)	Germain Racing	Chevrolet	19.459	0.000	—
25	16	Greg Biffle	Roush Fenway Racing	Ford	19.525	—	—
26	41	Kurt Busch	Stewart–Haas Racing	Chevrolet	19.533	—	—
27	25	Chase Elliott (i)	Hendrick Motorsports	Chevrolet	19.538	—	—
28	46	Michael Annett	HScott Motorsports	Chevrolet	19.542	—	—
29	38	David Gilliland	Front Row Motorsports	Ford	19.589	—	—
30	15	Clint Bowyer	Michael Waltrip Racing	Toyota	19.599	—	—
31	98	Josh Wise	Phil Parsons Racing	Ford	19.601	—	—
32	26	Jeb Burton (R)	BK Racing	Toyota	19.624	—	—
33	55	Brett Moffitt (R)	Michael Waltrip Racing	Toyota	19.652	—	—
34	40	Landon Cassill (i)	Hillman–Circle Sport	Chevrolet	19.664	—	—
35	34	Chris Buescher (i)	Front Row Motorsports	Ford	19.672	—	—
36	6	Trevor Bayne	Roush Fenway Racing	Ford	19.673	—	—
37	35	Cole Whitt	Front Row Motorsports	Ford	19.713	—	—
38	9	Sam Hornish Jr.	Richard Petty Motorsports	Ford	19.720	—	—
39	7	Alex Bowman	Tommy Baldwin Racing	Chevrolet	19.744	—	—
40	32	Mike Bliss (i)	Go FAS Racing	Ford	19.788	—	—
41	33	Alex Kennedy (R)	Hillman–Circle Sport	Chevrolet	19.871	—	—
42	23	J. J. Yeley (i)	BK Racing	Toyota	19.890	—	—
43	83	Matt DiBenedetto (R)	BK Racing	Toyota	20.025	—	—
Did not qualify
44	62	Brendan Gaughan (i)	Premium Motorsports	Chevrolet	19.801	—	—
45	30	Ron Hornaday Jr.	The Motorsports Group	Chevrolet	19.850	—	—
Official qualifying results

== Practice (post-qualifying) ==
=== Second practice ===
Denny Hamlin was the fastest in the second practice session with a time of 19.499 and a speed of 97.113 mph (156.288 km/h). Thirty minutes into the session, Jimmie Johnson started reporting that his car was having engine issues, but upon further inspection, it turned out to be a minor electrical issue. When he went back out, Johnson reported that there were "no issues".

Pos	No.	Driver	Team	Manufacturer	Time	Speed
1	11	Denny Hamlin	Joe Gibbs Racing	Toyota	19.499	97.113
2	48	Jimmie Johnson	Hendrick Motorsports	Chevrolet	19.524	96.988
3	24	Jeff Gordon	Hendrick Motorsports	Chevrolet	19.545	96.884
Official second practice results

=== Final practice ===
Kurt Busch was the fastest in the final practice session with a time of 19.502 and a speed of 97.098 mph (156.264 km/h). Greg Biffle made contact with the wall exiting turn 4 20 minutes into the session, causing cosmetic damage to his car; he returned to the track after minor repairs.

Pos	No.	Driver	Team	Manufacturer	Time	Speed
1	41	Kurt Busch	Stewart–Haas Racing	Chevrolet	19.502	97.098
2	48	Jimmie Johnson	Hendrick Motorsports	Chevrolet	19.560	96.810
3	24	Jeff Gordon	Hendrick Motorsports	Chevrolet	19.577	96.726
Official final practice results

== Prior to the race ==
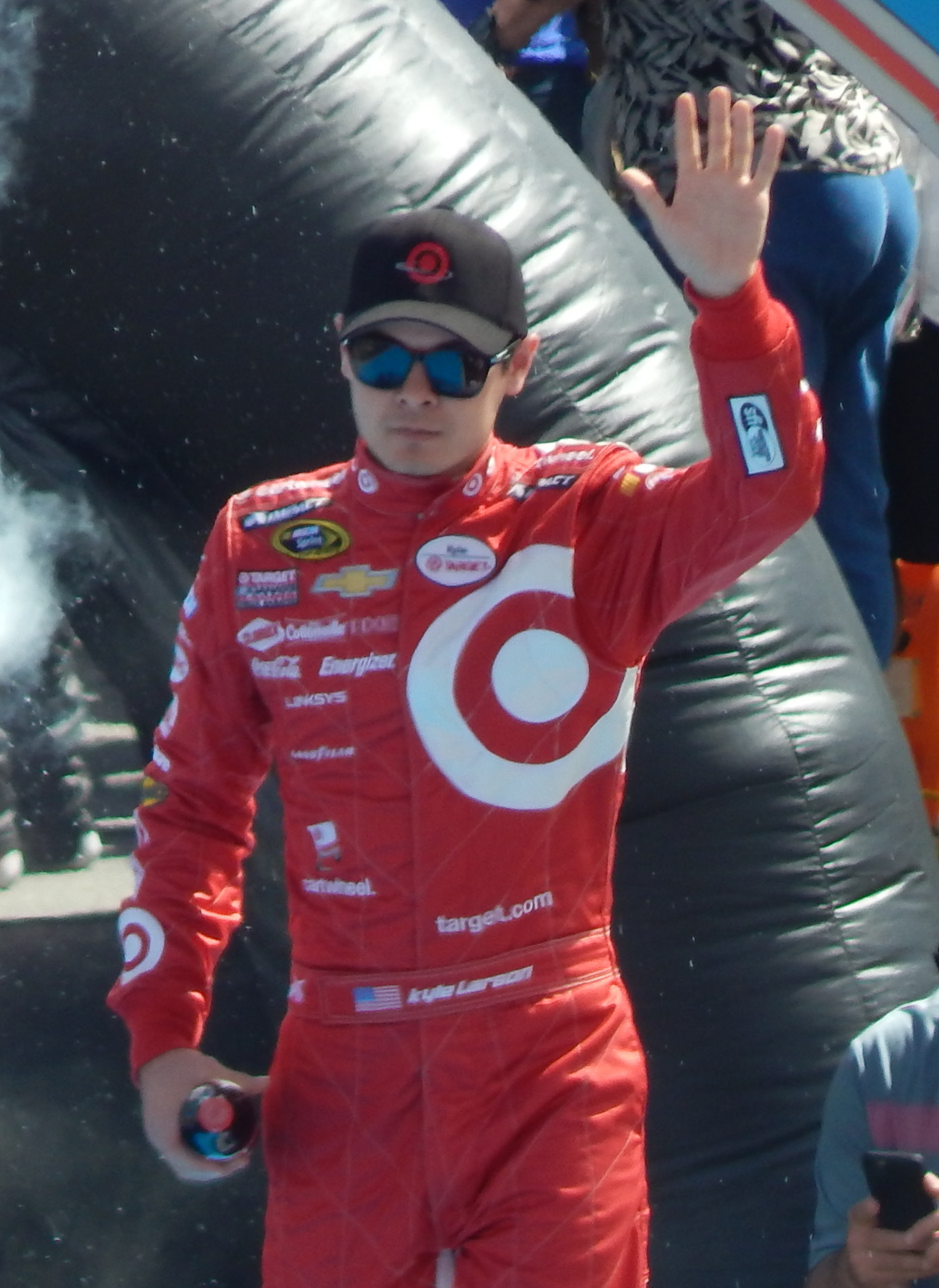
Kyle Larson, seen here at the 2015 Daytona 500, was sent to a hospital in Charlotte, North Carolina after fainting on Saturday.

On Saturday before the race, Kyle Larson was taken to a local hospital after fainting. John Olguin, vice-president of communications for Chip Ganassi Racing told Jim Utter of The Charlotte Observer that Larson suffered a fainting spell during an autograph session and was taken to the infield care center. Doctors at the care center advised that he go to a local hospital for further evaluation. While he checked out well by the hospital, Larson was sent to the Carolina Medical Center in Charlotte, North Carolina to be evaluated by a neurologist. On raceday morning, Chip Ganassi Racing announced that Larson was not medically cleared to race and that Regan Smith would drive in his place. As Larson qualified the car on Friday, his Chase eligibility was unaffected. With the driver change, Smith started from the rear of the field for the race.

== Race ==
=== First-half ===
==== Start ====
The race was scheduled to start at 1:13 p.m., but started five minutes later when Joey Logano led the field to the green flag. The first caution flew on lap 11 when Trevor Bayne spun out in turn 1. His left-rear tire got cut down after contact with Alex Bowman in turn 3. The race restarted on lap 17 with Logano still leading the field. On the following lap, Ryan Newman – in the outside lane – took the lead from Logano, but Logano eventually retook the lead on lap 20. The second caution flew on lap 22 when Ricky Stenhouse Jr. got loose in turn 3, spun out, and lightly rear-ended the wall.

The race restarted on lap 27 when Matt Kenseth, trapped on the outside line, nearly spun out in turn 3 trying to go underneath Jeff Gordon. The third caution flew on lap 54 when J. J. Yeley hit the wall in turn 1, after contact with Denny Hamlin caused his left-front tire to deflate. A. J. Allmendinger dropped to the tail end of the field for speeding on pit road as did Aric Almirola. The race restarted on lap 61. In a classic Martinsville accordion effect, Brett Moffitt crashed into the rear of Chase Elliott. Moffitt was forced to pit to remove the hood of his car, that was flapping. This brought out the fourth caution of the race. Elliott did not pit instantaneously, but took his car to the garage. Dale Earnhardt Jr. gave up fifth place to pit under the caution.

The race restarted on lap 82. The fifth caution flew on lap 94 when Alex Kennedy spun out in turn 4 after making contact with Matt DiBenedetto. Earnhardt Jr. came onto pit road before it was open apparently to fix something inside his car; he radioed to his team that he "lost the gear shifter". Martin Truex Jr. stayed out to take the lead with Danica Patrick and Landon Cassill doing likewise, while Mike Bliss dropped to the tail end for speeding on pit road.

==== Second quarter mark ====
The race restarted on lap 101. The field was log-jammed by Cassill and Patrick until Patrick got bumped by Cassill. This allowed Logano to get under Cassill and send him and Patrick backwards down the field. He caught Truex Jr. and passed him with ease to retake the lead on lap 121. By lap 128, Logano caught the tail end of the field to start the lapping process. Kevin Harvick jumped underneath Logano to take the lead on lap 135. Hamlin got under Harvick in turn 1 to retake the lead on lap 149. Around lap 150, Allmendinger's engine began smoking and there were reports that he was putting down oil on the track, but it ultimately turned out to be a left-front tire rub. Jimmie Johnson – an eight-time Martinsville winner – went a lap down on lap 161. This was compounded by the sixth caution on lap 163, which came out when Stenhouse Jr. spun in turn 4; so Casey Mears got the free pass as the first car a lap down, just ahead of Johnson.

Hamlin and Harvick swapped the lead on pit road and Harvick exited with the lead. Hamlin was forced to drop to the tail end of the field along with Allmendinger for an uncontrolled tire on pit road. Other pit penalties were levied to Kasey Kahne, who dropped to the rear for speeding, and Earnhardt, who dropped to the rear for having too many men over the wall. The race restarted on lap 172 and Brad Keselowski got the best restart to take the lead on lap 173. Eventually, Harvick powered by on the inside to take back the lead before losing it to his teammate Kurt Busch on lap 176. The seventh caution flew on lap 183 for debris in turn 4, which turned out to be a plastic grill plate from one of the Ford cars.

The race restarted on lap 189 with Busch in the lead, before Harvick retook the lead on lap 196. The eighth caution flew on lap 206 when Stenhouse Jr. hit the wall again in turn 3. Harvick and Logano swapped the lead on pit road and Harvick exited first. Justin Allgaier was held a lap for pitting outside his pit box, while Paul Menard dropped to the rear for speeding on pit road. For the second consecutive caution, Earnhardt Jr. dropped to the rear for too many men over the wall again. Kahne stayed out to take the lead, ahead of the restart on lap 216. The ninth caution flew on lap 219 when Michael Annett got loose in turn 2, and made contact with Logano, spinning both drivers out.

The race restarted on lap 225. The tenth caution of the race flew on lap 228 for a multi-car wreck in turn 1; it began with an accordion effect of Menard slowing down to avoid hitting someone, only for Earnhardt Jr. to rear-end him. Allgaier, Mears, David Ragan, and Cole Whitt were also caught in the incident. Drivers slowed down to try to avoid the initial contact between Ragan and Mears, but were unable to do so and the wreck followed. Earnhardt stated that he was unsure "why they stopped down there in the corner" and that he "knocked the radiator out" of his car.

=== Second-half ===
==== Halfway ====
The race restarted on lap 239 and as Kahne was on old tires, he was no match for Harvick's newer rubber as he took the lead on lap 240. The eleventh caution flew on lap 269 when Allgaier hit the wall. Carl Edwards took the lead under caution, ahead of the restart on lap 285. Harvick took the lead back just before the twelfth caution flew for a multi-car wreck in turn 3, which began when Busch turned into Regan Smith, caving in his car's nose. Annett cut down through the patch of grass after being bumped in the rear by Trevor Bayne and got into Ryan Newman.

The race restarted on lap 295 with Harvick in the lead. Keselowski took the lead back on lap 303 and led for the next few laps, before catching lapped cars at the wrong spot and lost the lead to Hamlin on lap 317. Harvick got underneath Hamlin to retake the lead on lap 328, and he maintained the lead until the thirteenth caution flew on lap 354 when Annett hit the wall in turn 1. With his pit stall being behind the start/finish line, Harvick swapped the lead with Kenseth on pit road, but Harvick returned to the track in the lead for the restart on lap 364. The fourteenth caution of the race flew on lap 367 when Menard got loose entering turn 3, and got turned around by Logano in turn 4. His spin delayed Almirola, Bayne, and Greg Biffle.

==== Fourth quarter ====
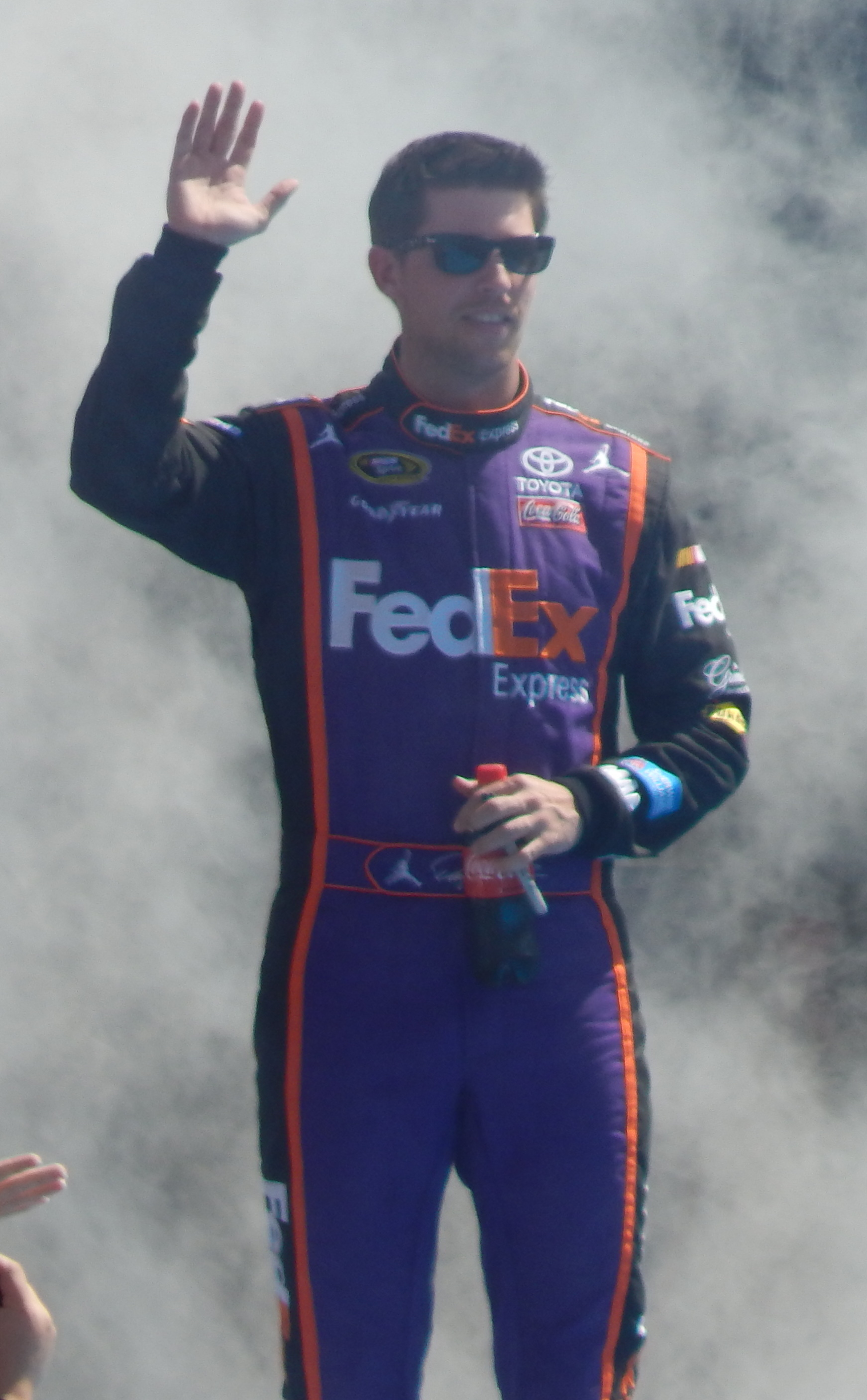
Denny Hamlin, seen here at the 2015 Daytona 500, scored his 25th career victory at Martinsville.

The race restarted with 127 laps to go. Busch changed lanes before the start/finish line and was ordered to serve a pass-through penalty. His crew chief Tony Gibson requested a review of the call and the penalty was rescinded. This was due to the fact that Busch was supposed to be lined up on the inside for the restart. Hamlin took back the lead with 101 laps to go. The fifteenth caution flew with 69 laps to go when Edwards spun out in turn 4 after a right-rear puncture. Kenseth led a lap with Hamlin pitting behind the start/finish line and maintained the lead at the culmination of the stops. Busch dropped to the rear for having too many men over the wall on pit road and Earnhardt Jr. dropped to the rear for speeding on pit road. The race restarted with 61 laps to go, and Gordon took the lead for the first time with 59 laps to go. Debris on the front stretch brought out the sixteenth caution of the race with 40 to go. Kenseth exited pit road first, but Tony Stewart stayed out to take the lead. Gordon was caught speeding on pit road and dropped to the rear of the field. After the race, Gordon was "disappointed" in regards to the speeding violation and that he "felt like [they] finally got the car, got [their]selves in a position to win that race".

The race restarted with 34 laps to go. Kenseth took the lead with 29 laps to go, before ceding the lead to Hamlin a couple of laps later. Hamlin retained the lead for the remainder of the race and despite a last turn bump by Keselowski, he achieved his fifth Martinsville win in the Sprint Cup Series.

== Post-race ==
=== Driver comments ===
In victory lane, Hamlin stated that he and his team "just weren't going to be denied today", while also praising Keselowski for not wrecking him coming off the final turn. Keselowski stated that he "just felt like [I] raced him the way [he] wanted to be raced", amid criticism for not pursuing the victory. An eighth-place finish ended Harvick's Top 2 finishing streak at eight races. Harvick expressed that he "just got hung on the outside and couldn't get back down" and that he "just lost track position at the wrong time". Patrick's seventh-place finish tied her with Janet Guthrie for the most top 10 finishes in the Sprint Cup Series by a female driver with five.

== Race results ==
Pos	No.	Driver	Team	Manufacturer	Laps	Points
1	11	Denny Hamlin	Joe Gibbs Racing	Toyota	500	47
2	2	Brad Keselowski	Team Penske	Ford	500	43
3	22	Joey Logano	Team Penske	Ford	500	42
4	20	Matt Kenseth	Joe Gibbs Racing	Toyota	500	41
5	18	David Ragan	Joe Gibbs Racing	Toyota	500	39
6	78	Martin Truex Jr.	Furniture Row Racing	Chevrolet	500	39
7	10	Danica Patrick	Stewart–Haas Racing	Chevrolet	500	37
8	4	Kevin Harvick	Stewart–Haas Racing	Chevrolet	500	38
9	24	Jeff Gordon	Hendrick Motorsports	Chevrolet	500	36
10	1	Jamie McMurray	Chip Ganassi Racing	Chevrolet	500	34
11	5	Kasey Kahne	Hendrick Motorsports	Chevrolet	500	34
12	43	Aric Almirola	Richard Petty Motorsports	Ford	500	32
13	15	Clint Bowyer	Michael Waltrip Racing	Toyota	500	31
14	41	Kurt Busch	Stewart–Haas Racing	Chevrolet	500	31
15	13	Casey Mears	Germain Racing	Chevrolet	500	29
16	42	Regan Smith (i)	Chip Ganassi Racing	Chevrolet	500	0
17	19	Carl Edwards	Joe Gibbs Racing	Toyota	500	28
18	6	Trevor Bayne	Roush Fenway Racing	Ford	500	26
19	16	Greg Biffle	Roush Fenway Racing	Ford	500	25
20	14	Tony Stewart	Stewart–Haas Racing	Chevrolet	500	25
21	40	Landon Cassill (i)	Hillman–Circle Sport	Chevrolet	500	0
22	35	Cole Whitt	Front Row Motorsports	Ford	499	22
23	27	Paul Menard	Richard Childress Racing	Chevrolet	499	21
24	34	Chris Buescher (i)	Front Row Motorsports	Ford	499	0
25	38	David Gilliland	Front Row Motorsports	Ford	499	19
26	23	J. J. Yeley (i)	BK Racing	Toyota	497	0
27	31	Ryan Newman	Richard Childress Racing	Chevrolet	496	18
28	55	Brett Moffitt (R)	Michael Waltrip Racing	Toyota	496	16
29	26	Jeb Burton (R)	BK Racing	Toyota	496	15
30	98	Josh Wise	Phil Parsons Racing	Ford	496	14
31	83	Matt DiBenedetto (R)	BK Racing	Toyota	494	13
32	9	Sam Hornish Jr.	Richard Petty Motorsports	Ford	493	12
33	33	Alex Kennedy (R)	Hillman–Circle Sport	Chevrolet	492	11
34	32	Mike Bliss (i)	Go FAS Racing	Ford	491	0
35	48	Jimmie Johnson	Hendrick Motorsports	Chevrolet	468	9
36	88	Dale Earnhardt Jr.	Hendrick Motorsports	Chevrolet	453	8
37	7	Alex Bowman	Tommy Baldwin Racing	Chevrolet	444	7
38	25	Chase Elliott (i)	Hendrick Motorsports	Chevrolet	427	0
39	46	Michael Annett	HScott Motorsports	Chevrolet	389	5
40	17	Ricky Stenhouse Jr.	Roush Fenway Racing	Ford	364	4
41	3	Austin Dillon	Richard Childress Racing	Chevrolet	330	3
42	51	Justin Allgaier	HScott Motorsports	Chevrolet	328	2
43	47	A. J. Allmendinger	JTG Daugherty Racing	Chevrolet	177	1
Official STP 500 results

=== Race statistics ===
- 31 lead changes among 13 different drivers
- 16 cautions for 112 laps
- Time of race: 3 hours, 49 minutes, 13 seconds
- Average speed: 68.843 mph (110.792 km/h)
- Denny Hamlin took home $172,260 in winnings

Lap Leaders
Laps	Leader
1–16	Joey Logano
17–18	Ryan Newman
19–56	Joey Logano
57	Mike Bliss
58–96	Joey Logano
97–119	Martin Truex Jr.
120–133	Joey Logano
134–147	Kevin Harvick
148–164	Denny Hamlin
165	Brad Keselowski
166–170	Kevin Harvick
171–172	Brad Keselowski
173	Kevin Harvick
174–194	Kurt Busch
195–207	Kevin Harvick
208	Joey Logano
209–237	Kasey Kahne
238–270	Kevin Harvick
271	Brad Keselowski
272–284	Carl Edwards
285–301	Kevin Harvick
302–315	Brad Keselowski
316–326	Denny Hamlin
327–357	Kevin Harvick
358	Matt Kenseth
359–398	Kevin Harvick
399–433	Denny Hamlin
434–441	Matt Kenseth
442–462	Jeff Gordon
463–470	Tony Stewart
471–472	Matt Kenseth
473–500	Denny Hamlin

Total laps led
Leader	Laps
Kevin Harvick	154
Joey Logano	108
Denny Hamlin	91
Kasey Kahne	29
Martin Truex Jr.	23
Jeff Gordon	21
Kurt Busch	21
Brad Keselowski	18
Carl Edwards	13
Matt Kenseth	11
Tony Stewart	8
Ryan Newman	2
Mike Bliss	1

==== Race awards ====
- Coors Light Pole Award: Joey Logano (19.232, 98.461 mph (158.458 km/h))
- 3M Lap Leader: Kevin Harvick (154 laps)
- Get Bioethanol Green Flag Restart Award: Kevin Harvick (20.519, 92.287 mph (148.522 km/h))
- Duralast Brakes "Bake In The Race" Award: Kevin Harvick
- Freescale "Wide Open": Joey Logano
- Ingersoll Rand Power Move: Kurt Busch, 5 positions
- MAHLE Clevite Engine Builder of the Race: Roush-Yates Engines, #22
- Mobil 1 Driver of the Race: Denny Hamlin (134.9 driver rating)
- Moog Steering and Suspension Problem Solver of The Race: David Ragan (crew chief Adam Stevens 0.129 seconds)
- NASCAR Sprint Cup Leader Bonus: No winner: rolls over to $30,000 at next event
- Sherwin-Williams Fastest Lap: Denny Hamlin (Lap 66: 19.662, 96.310 mph (154.996 km/h))
- Sunoco Rookie of The Race: Brett Moffitt

== Media ==
=== Television ===
Fox Sports covered their fifteenth race at Martinsville Speedway. This was also the first scheduled points race aired on Fox Sports 1. FS1 had previously carried the rain-delayed 2014 Food City 500 as well as the exhibition 2014 NASCAR Sprint All-Star Race. Mike Joy, Larry McReynolds and eleven-time Martinsville race winner Darrell Waltrip had the call in the booth for the race. Jamie Little, Chris Neville and Matt Yocum handled the pit road duties for the television side.

Fox Sports 1
Booth announcers	Pit reporters
Lap-by-lap: Mike Joy; Color-commentator: Larry McReynolds; Color commentator: Darrell Waltrip	Jamie Little; Chris Neville; Matt Yocum

=== Radio ===
MRN had the radio call for the race, which was also simulcasted on Sirius XM NASCAR Radio. Joe Moore, Jeff Striegle and seven time Martinsville winner Rusty Wallace called the race in the booth when the field was racing down the front stretch. Dave Moody called the race from the Bill France Tower stands in turn 3 when the field was racing down the backstretch. Alex Hayden, Winston Kelley and Steve Post worked pit road for MRN.

MRN
Booth announcers	Turn announcers	Pit reporters
Lead announcer: Joe Moore; Announcer: Jeff Striegle; Announcer: Rusty Wallace	Backstretch: Dave Moody	Alex Hayden; Winston Kelley; Steve Post

== Standings after the race ==
Drivers' Championship standings

	Pos	Driver	Points
	1	Kevin Harvick	263
	2	Joey Logano	239 (−24)
	3	Martin Truex Jr.	231 (−32)
1	4	Brad Keselowski	206 (−57)
3	5	Kasey Kahne	193 (−70)
3	6	Paul Menard	173 (−90)
7	7	Denny Hamlin	172 (−91)
4	8	Dale Earnhardt Jr.	172 (−91)
1	9	Aric Almirola	170 (−93)
3	10	Jimmie Johnson	168 (−95)
2	11	Matt Kenseth	168 (−95)
3	12	David Ragan	163 (−100)
1	13	Casey Mears	161 (−102)
2	14	Jamie McMurray	154 (−109)
8	15	Danica Patrick	148 (−115)
6	16	Jeff Gordon	148 (−115)

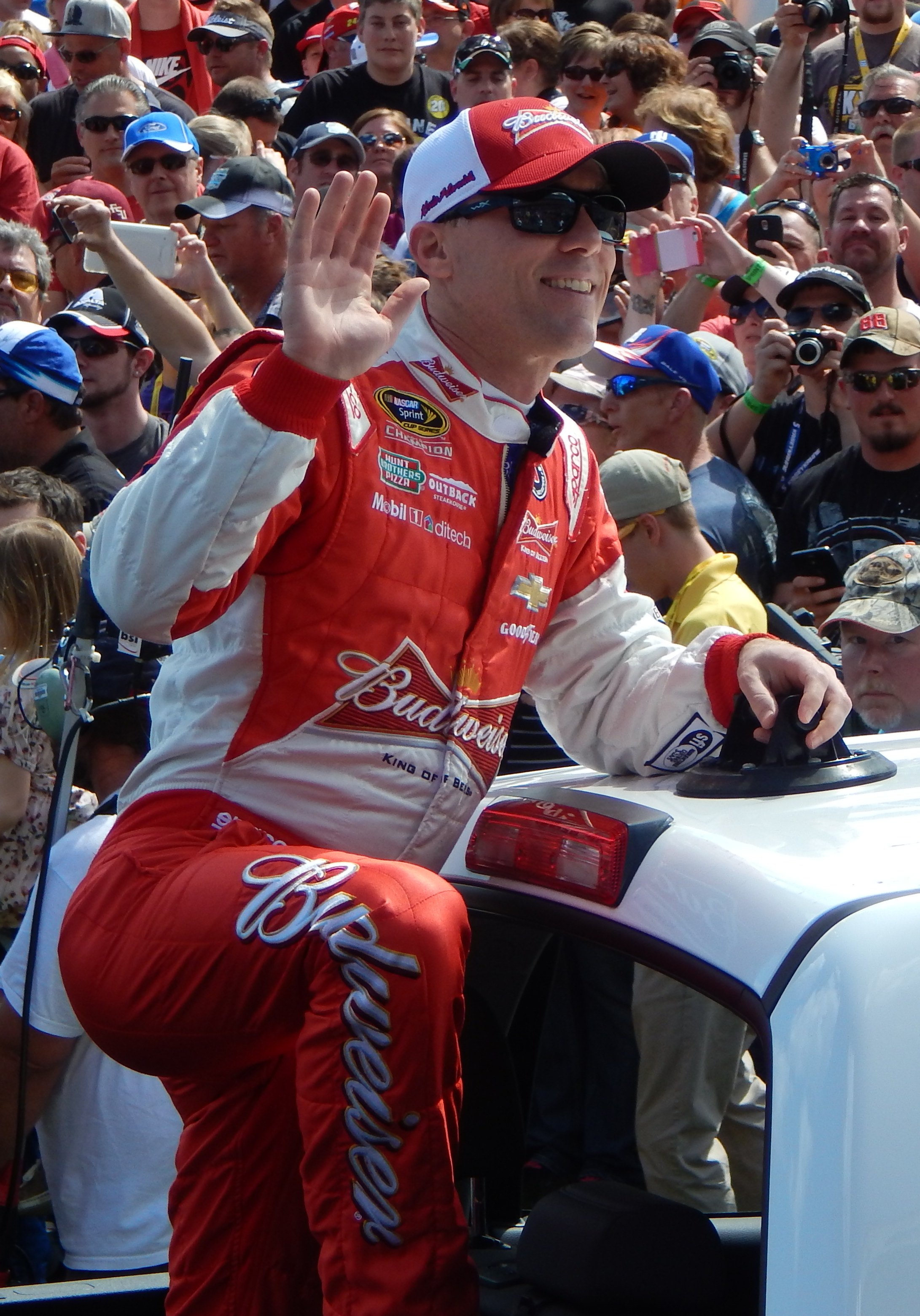
Kevin Harvick left Martinsville with a 24-point lead over Joey Logano.

Manufacturers' Championship standings

Pos	Manufacturer	Points
1	Chevrolet	267
2	Ford	255 (−12)
3	Toyota	230 (−37)

- Note: Only the first sixteen positions are included for the driver standings.

== Notes ==
Previous race: 2015 Auto Club 400	Sprint Cup Series; 2015 season	Next race: 2015 Duck Commander 500
