= 2015 Kobalt 400 =

Race details
- Race 3 of 36 in the 2015 NASCAR Sprint Cup Series
- Date: March 8, 2015
- Location: Las Vegas Motor Speedway in Las Vegas
- Course: Permanent racing facility
- Course length: 1.5 miles (2.41 km)
- Distance: 267 laps, 400.5 mi (644.542 km)
- Weather: Sunny skies with a temperature of 72 °F (22 °C); wind out of the south/southwest at 3.5 mph (5.6 km/h)
- Average speed: 143.667 mph (231.210 km/h)

Pole position
Driver	Jeff Gordon	Hendrick Motorsports
- Time: 27.738

Most laps led
Driver	Kevin Harvick	Stewart–Haas Racing
- Laps: 142

Winner
No. 4	Kevin Harvick	Stewart–Haas Racing

Television in the United States
- Network: Fox
- Announcers: Mike Joy, Larry McReynolds and Darrell Waltrip
- Nielsen ratings: 4.3/10 (Overnight); 4.6/10 (Final); 7.7 Million viewers

Radio in the United States
- Radio: PRN
- Booth announcers: Doug Rice, Mark Garrow and Wendy Venturini
- Turn announcers: Rob Albright (1 & 2) and Pat Patterson (3 & 4)

The 2015 Kobalt 400 was a NASCAR Sprint Cup Series race held on March 8, 2015, at Las Vegas Motor Speedway in Las Vegas. Contested over 267 laps on the 1.5 mi (2.4 km) asphalt tri-oval, it was the third race of the 2015 NASCAR Sprint Cup Series season. Kevin Harvick won the race, his first of the season, while Martin Truex Jr. finished second. Ryan Newman, Dale Earnhardt Jr. and Denny Hamlin rounded out the top five.

Jeff Gordon set a new track record time on his way to winning the pole for the race. He started the race from the rear of the field after an incident in practice and never led a single lap in his final race at the track. The race had 18 lead changes among nine different drivers, as well as six caution flag periods for 28 laps.

Harvick's 29th career victory was his first at Las Vegas Motor Speedway and the second at the track for Stewart–Haas Racing. With the win, he leapfrogged Joey Logano for the points lead and left the track with a nine-point lead over Earnhardt. Chevrolet increased their lead over Ford to eleven points in the manufacturers' standings.

The race was carried by Fox Sports on the broadcast Fox network for the American television audience. The radio broadcast of the race was carried by the Performance Racing Network and Sirius XM NASCAR Radio.

== Report ==
=== Background ===
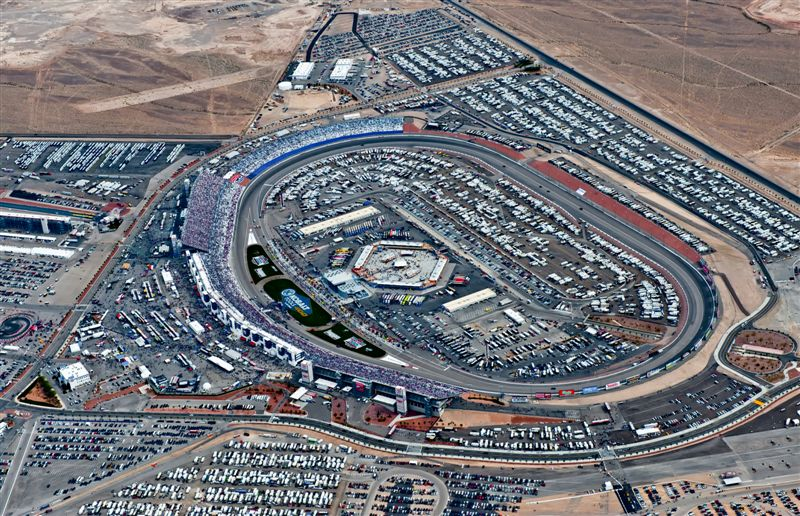
Overhead view of the track

Las Vegas Motor Speedway, located in Clark County, Nevada about 15 miles (24 km) northeast of the Las Vegas Strip, is a 1,200-acre (490 ha) complex of multiple tracks for motorsports racing. The complex is owned by Speedway Motorsports, Inc., which is headquartered in Charlotte, North Carolina.

Joey Logano entered Las Vegas with a one-point lead over Jimmie Johnson who scored his 71st career win the previous week at Atlanta Motor Speedway. Kevin Harvick came into Vegas third in the points two back of Logano, having led 116 of the 325 laps at Atlanta. Dale Earnhardt Jr. entered fourth in the points four back, while Martin Truex Jr. entered fifth in the points 13 back.

==== Entry list ====
The entry list for the Kobalt 400 was released on Monday, March 2, 2015, at 9:00 a.m. Eastern time. Forty-eight drivers are entered for the race. All 48, except Ryan Blaney and the No. 21 Wood Brothers Racing Ford and Ty Dillon, were entered to race the previous week in Atlanta. Dillon drove the No. 33 Hillman–Circle Sport Chevrolet. No driver was on the initial entry list to drive the No. 34 Front Row Motorsports Ford in place of David Ragan who drove in place of the injured Kyle Busch. On Wednesday, March 4, Brett Moffitt, coming off an 8th-place finish at Atlanta, was named to drive the No. 34 car. Moffitt stated that he was "excited about the opportunity to run some races for Front Row", and that he was "grateful to Bob Jenkins and his team for giving me the chance to do that". Brian Vickers, the driver who Moffitt was driving in place of – at Michael Waltrip Racing – was in the No. 55 Toyota, having missed the first two races while recovering from corrective heart surgery.

No.	Driver	Team	Manufacturer
1	Jamie McMurray	Chip Ganassi Racing	Chevrolet
2	Brad Keselowski (PC3)	Team Penske	Ford
3	Austin Dillon	Richard Childress Racing	Chevrolet
4	Kevin Harvick (PC1)	Stewart–Haas Racing	Chevrolet
5	Kasey Kahne	Hendrick Motorsports	Chevrolet
6	Trevor Bayne	Roush Fenway Racing	Ford
7	Alex Bowman	Tommy Baldwin Racing	Chevrolet
9	Sam Hornish Jr.	Richard Petty Motorsports	Ford
10	Danica Patrick	Stewart–Haas Racing	Chevrolet
11	Denny Hamlin	Joe Gibbs Racing	Toyota
13	Casey Mears	Germain Racing	Chevrolet
14	Tony Stewart (PC4)	Stewart–Haas Racing	Chevrolet
15	Clint Bowyer	Michael Waltrip Racing	Toyota
16	Greg Biffle	Roush Fenway Racing	Ford
17	Ricky Stenhouse Jr.	Roush Fenway Racing	Ford
18	David Ragan	Joe Gibbs Racing	Toyota
19	Carl Edwards	Joe Gibbs Racing	Toyota
20	Matt Kenseth (PC5)	Joe Gibbs Racing	Toyota
21	Ryan Blaney (i)	Wood Brothers Racing	Ford
22	Joey Logano	Team Penske	Ford
23	J. J. Yeley (i)	BK Racing	Toyota
24	Jeff Gordon (PC6)	Hendrick Motorsports	Chevrolet
26	Jeb Burton (R)	BK Racing	Toyota
27	Paul Menard	Richard Childress Racing	Chevrolet
29	Reed Sorenson	RAB Racing	Toyota
31	Ryan Newman	Richard Childress Racing	Chevrolet
32	Mike Bliss	Go FAS Racing	Ford
33	Ty Dillon (i)	Hillman–Circle Sport	Chevrolet
34	Brett Moffitt (R)	Front Row Motorsports	Ford
35	Cole Whitt	Front Row Motorsports	Ford
38	David Gilliland	Front Row Motorsports	Ford
40	Landon Cassill (i)	Hillman–Circle Sport	Chevrolet
41	Regan Smith (i)	Stewart–Haas Racing	Chevrolet
42	Kyle Larson	Chip Ganassi Racing	Chevrolet
43	Aric Almirola	Richard Petty Motorsports	Ford
44	Travis Kvapil (i)	Team XTREME Racing	Chevrolet
46	Michael Annett	HScott Motorsports	Chevrolet
47	A. J. Allmendinger	JTG Daugherty Racing	Chevrolet
48	Jimmie Johnson (PC2)	Hendrick Motorsports	Chevrolet
51	Justin Allgaier	HScott Motorsports	Chevrolet
55	Brian Vickers	Michael Waltrip Racing	Toyota
62	Brendan Gaughan (i)	Premium Motorsports	Chevrolet
66	Mike Wallace	Premium Motorsports	Chevrolet
78	Martin Truex Jr.	Furniture Row Racing	Chevrolet
83	Matt DiBenedetto (R)	BK Racing	Toyota
88	Dale Earnhardt Jr.	Hendrick Motorsports	Chevrolet
95	Michael McDowell	Leavine Family Racing	Ford
98	Josh Wise	Phil Parsons Racing	Ford
Official initial entry list
Official updated entry list

Key	Meaning
(R)	Rookie
(i)	Ineligible for points
(PC#)	Past champions provisional

== First practice ==
Kyle Larson was the fastest in the first practice session with a time of 28.177 and a speed of 191.646 mph (308.424 km/h). Brian Vickers, making his first start since undergoing heart surgery in December, was 33rd fastest in the session. Vickers described his return as "awesome" and that he was "really excited to be back".

Pos	No.	Driver	Team	Manufacturer	Time	Speed
1	42	Kyle Larson	Chip Ganassi Racing	Chevrolet	28.177	191.646
2	24	Jeff Gordon	Hendrick Motorsports	Chevrolet	28.239	191.225
3	2	Brad Keselowski	Team Penske	Ford	28.267	191.035
Official first practice results

== Qualifying ==
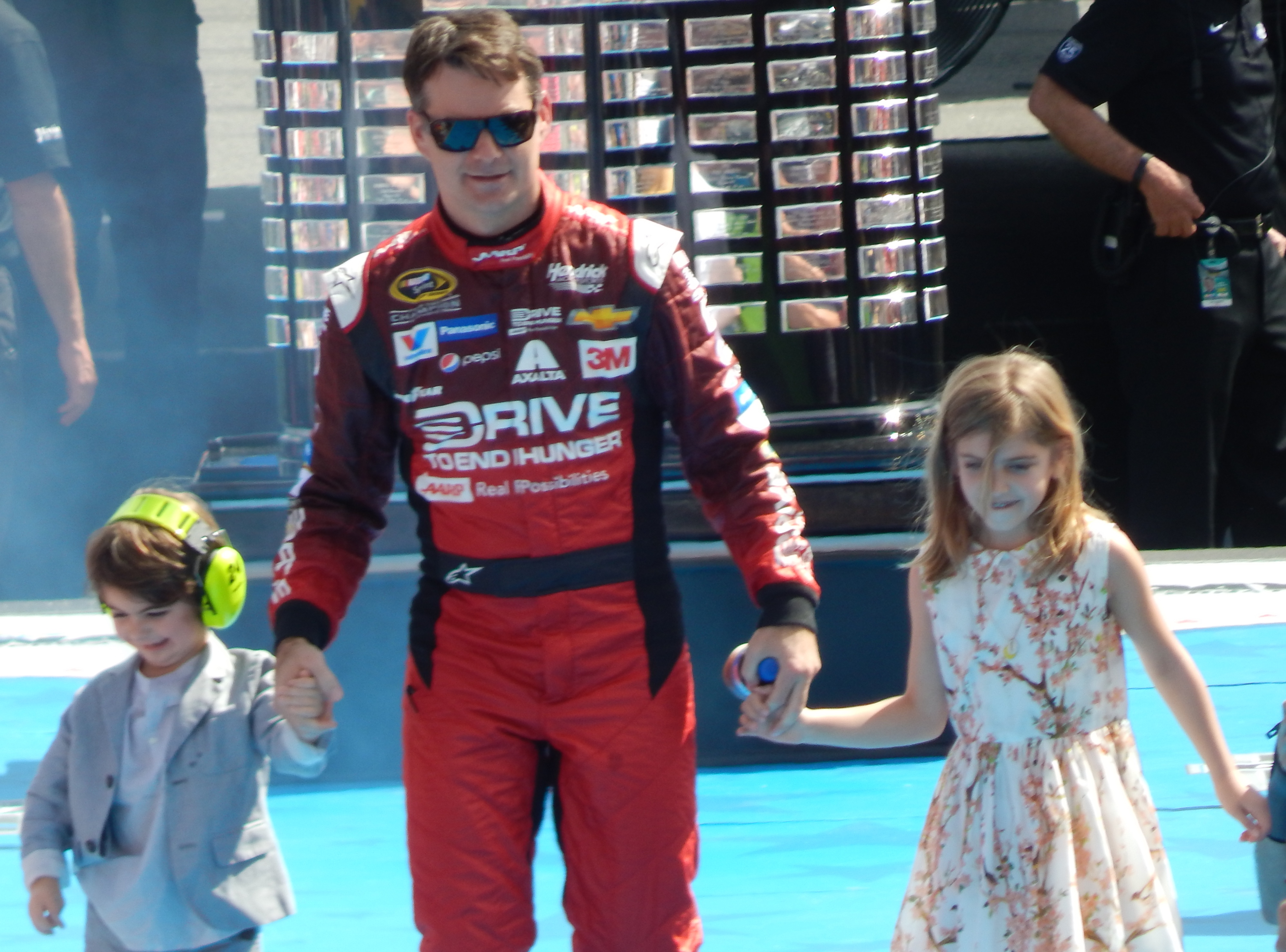
Jeff Gordon, seen here at the 2015 Daytona 500, won his 79th career pole in his final start at Las Vegas Motor Speedway.

Jeff Gordon won his 79th career pole with a new track record time of 27.738 and a speed of 194.679 mph (313.305 km/h). Gordon took pole by 0.052 seconds ahead of Joey Logano, and ultimately described the margin as "real close". Gordon added that he was "just so proud of this team and keeping their heads up". Logano himself repeated Gordon's point on the close margin, adding that his Ford "ha[d] some speed in it which is cool". Dale Earnhardt Jr. qualified fourth, which pleased him, stating that his recent performances on the intermediate tracks gave him "hope it is a sign of things to come". Following a multi-car crash in qualifying at Daytona and 13 cars not making it through inspection at Atlanta, the only hiccup in qualifying belonged to Brad Keselowski. Just as he was about to get in his car to qualify in round 1, a NASCAR official ordered his team to take the car back to the inspection line after witnessing the team pulled out the wheel wells which had been outlawed during the offseason. Reed Sorenson, Mike Bliss, Travis Kvapil, Mike Wallace, and Matt DiBenedetto all failed to qualify for the race.

=== Qualifying results ===
Pos	No.	Driver	Team	Manufacturer	R1	R2	R3
1	24	Jeff Gordon (Note: Jeff Gordon, David Ragan and Danica Patrick started from the rear after switching to a backup car post-qualifying.)	Hendrick Motorsports	Chevrolet	28.245	27.885	27.738
2	22	Joey Logano	Team Penske	Ford	27.966	27.908	27.790
3	5	Kasey Kahne	Hendrick Motorsports	Chevrolet	28.097	27.928	27.794
4	88	Dale Earnhardt Jr.	Hendrick Motorsports	Chevrolet	28.105	27.928	27.822
5	42	Kyle Larson	Chip Ganassi Racing	Chevrolet	27.994	27.880	27.841
6	20	Matt Kenseth	Joe Gibbs Racing	Toyota	28.057	27.937	27.888
7	31	Ryan Newman	Richard Childress Racing	Chevrolet	28.292	27.996	27.906
8	78	Martin Truex Jr.	Furniture Row Racing	Chevrolet	28.132	27.996	27.932
9	48	Jimmie Johnson	Hendrick Motorsports	Chevrolet	28.128	27.984	27.931
10	1	Jamie McMurray	Chip Ganassi Racing	Chevrolet	28.236	27.859	27.963
11	2	Brad Keselowski	Team Penske	Ford	28.124	28.005	28.044
12	14	Tony Stewart	Stewart–Haas Racing	Chevrolet	28.196	28.011	28.083
13	18	David Ragan	Joe Gibbs Racing	Toyota	28.236	28.025	—
14	19	Carl Edwards	Joe Gibbs Racing	Toyota	28.144	28.048	—
15	43	Aric Almirola	Richard Petty Motorsports	Ford	28.352	28.056	—
16	16	Greg Biffle	Roush Fenway Racing	Ford	28.326	28.063	—
17	13	Casey Mears	Germain Racing	Chevrolet	28.194	28.082	—
18	4	Kevin Harvick	Stewart–Haas Racing	Chevrolet	28.345	28.084	—
19	11	Denny Hamlin	Joe Gibbs Racing	Toyota	28.313	28.157	—
20	15	Clint Bowyer	Michael Waltrip Racing	Toyota	28.340	28.159	—
21	10	Danica Patrick	Stewart–Haas Racing	Chevrolet	28.274	28.195	—
22	47	A. J. Allmendinger	JTG Daugherty Racing	Chevrolet	28.350	28.222	—
23	33	Brian Scott (i)	Hillman–Circle Sport	Chevrolet	28.332	28.337	—
24	27	Paul Menard	Richard Childress Racing	Chevrolet	28.355	28.422	—
25	3	Austin Dillon	Richard Childress Racing	Chevrolet	28.368	—	—
26	51	Justin Allgaier	HScott Motorsports	Chevrolet	28.426	—	—
27	7	Alex Bowman	Tommy Baldwin Racing	Chevrolet	28.429	—	—
28	55	Brian Vickers	Michael Waltrip Racing	Toyota	28.448	—	—
29	9	Sam Hornish Jr.	Richard Petty Motorsports	Ford	28.462	—	—
30	21	Ryan Blaney (i)	Wood Brothers Racing	Ford	28.504	—	—
31	17	Ricky Stenhouse Jr.	Roush Fenway Racing	Ford	28.518	—	—
32	95	Michael McDowell	Leavine Family Racing	Ford	28.524	—	—
33	46	Michael Annett	HScott Motorsports	Chevrolet	28.537	—	—
34	41	Regan Smith (i)	Stewart–Haas Racing	Chevrolet	28.539	—	—
35	6	Trevor Bayne	Roush Fenway Racing	Ford	28.571	—	—
36	34	Brett Moffitt (R)	Front Row Motorsports	Ford	28.649	—	—
37	38	David Gilliland	Front Row Motorsports	Ford	28.865	—	—
38	35	Cole Whitt	Front Row Motorsports	Ford	28.948	—	—
39	98	Josh Wise	Phil Parsons Racing	Ford	28.970	—	—
40	23	J. J. Yeley (i)	BK Racing	Toyota	29.008	—	—
41	26	Jeb Burton (R)	BK Racing	Toyota	29.076	—	—
42	40	Landon Cassill (i)	Hillman–Circle Sport	Chevrolet	29.441	—	—
43	62	Brendan Gaughan (i)	Premium Motorsports	Chevrolet	29.518	—	—
Did not qualify
44	32	Mike Bliss (i)	Go FAS Racing	Ford	29.092	—	—
45	29	Reed Sorenson	RAB Racing	Toyota	29.201	—	—
46	44	Travis Kvapil (i)	Team XTREME Racing	Chevrolet	29.247	—	—
47	66	Mike Wallace	Premium Motorsports	Chevrolet	29.794	—	—
48	83	Matt DiBenedetto (R)	BK Racing	Toyota	29.889	—	—
Official qualifying results

== Practice (post-qualifying) ==
=== Second practice ===
Jimmie Johnson was the fastest in the second practice session with a time of 28.141 and a speed of 191.891 mph (308.819 km/h). Aric Almirola spun off of turn 2 and slid down the track with nine minutes remaining in the session. He stopped a few feet short of the inside wall on the backstretch and drove the car back to the garage.

Pos	No.	Driver	Team	Manufacturer	Time	Speed
1	48	Jimmie Johnson	Hendrick Motorsports	Chevrolet	28.141	191.891
2	31	Ryan Newman	Richard Childress Racing	Chevrolet	28.455	189.773
3	4	Kevin Harvick	Stewart–Haas Racing	Chevrolet	28.471	189.667
Official second practice results

=== Final practice ===
Jimmie Johnson was the fastest in the final practice session with a time of 28.779 and a speed of 187.637 mph (301.972 km/h). In the final minute of the session, Danica Patrick spun out exiting turn 2 and was hit by Jeff Gordon. The resultant damage from the collision forced Gordon's team to switch to their backup car, and as a result, Gordon started from the rear of the field. The collision came just seconds after David Ragan hit the wall in turn 1. He also switched to his backup car and also started from the rear.

Pos	No.	Driver	Team	Manufacturer	Time	Speed
1	48	Jimmie Johnson	Hendrick Motorsports	Chevrolet	28.779	187.637
2	22	Joey Logano	Team Penske	Ford	28.890	186.916
3	13	Casey Mears	Germain Racing	Chevrolet	28.961	186.458
Official final practice results

== Race ==
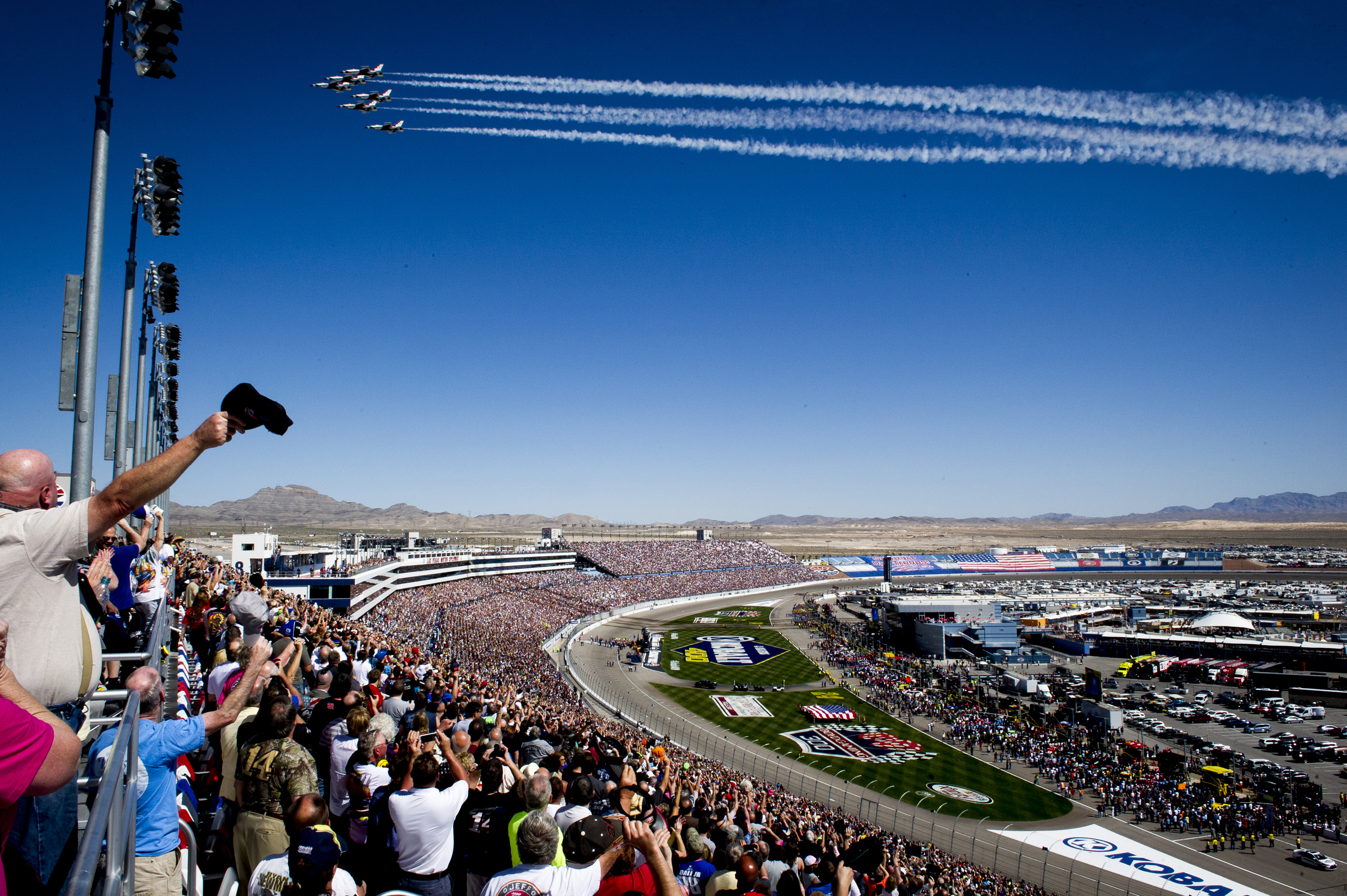
The United States Air Force Thunderbirds perform a flypast prior to the start of the race

=== First-half ===
==== Start ====
The race was scheduled to start at 3:46 p.m. Eastern time, but started a couple of minutes later when Kasey Kahne led the field to the green flag. He was immediately passed by Joey Logano who took the lead on the second lap. Jeff Gordon, who dropped to the rear of the field for switching to a backup car, moved up to 24th in the first 20 laps. He made it to 21st in the running order when the first caution of the race flew on lap 26. This was a scheduled competition caution, normally done when there has been overnight showers, to allow teams to check tire wear. As Logano was trying to exit pit road, Jeff Gordon, whose stall was right in front of his, blocked his exit momentarily and Dale Earnhardt Jr. exited pit road as the leader. Alex Bowman stayed out to lead a lap before pitting and giving the lead to Earnhardt. Unfortunately for Bowman, his engine started blowing up and he was forced to take his car to the garage.

The race restarted on lap 31 and it did not take long for Logano to find his way back to the lead. Jimmie Johnson reeled in Logano and took the lead on lap 44. Earnhardt Jr. had pulled up to him by lap 63, but had trouble getting around lapped traffic and Johnson pulled away. A number of cars began pitting on lap 75. Johnson gave up the lead on lap 77 to pit and handed the lead to Carl Edwards. He pitted on lap 79 and handed the lead to Matt Kenseth. He pitted the next lap and the lead cycled back to Johnson. Brendan Gaughan and Brian Scott were forced to serve a drive-through penalty for speeding on pit road.

==== Green flag stops ====
Debris in turn 1 brought out the second caution on lap 82. This was a saving grace for Brad Keselowski who was reporting a vibration. Aric Almirola was forced to drop to the end of the longest line for speeding on pit road, as did Tony Stewart, as a tire rolled out of his pit box. The race restarted on lap 87. Four laps later, Kevin Harvick powered his way around Johnson, who made an unscheduled stop for a loose wheel, to take the lead. He rejoined the race 33rd one lap down. The next set of green flag stops began on lap 129 when Martin Truex Jr. gave up tenth to pit. Harvick gave up the lead on lap 132 to hit pit road and Keselowski took the top spot. He held the lead for two laps before pitting on lap 134. This allowed his teammate Joey Logano to retake the lead. Keselowski was forced to serve a drive-through penalty for an uncontrolled tire rolling out onto the tri-oval grass area, which brought out the third caution of the race on lap 139.

=== Second-half ===
The race restarted on lap 145 and Harvick would lose the lead to Martin Truex Jr. He eventually lost the lead to Harvick on lap 149. The fourth caution of the race flew on lap 172 when Jimmie Johnson blew a right-front tire and his car hit the wall in the tri-oval. Jeb Burton, slowing down to avoid Johnson, got turned into the wall by Jeff Gordon. Joey Logano was forced to drop to the end of the longest line for speeding on pit road. He was joined by David Ragan for an uncontrolled tire.

==== Trouble for Johnson ====
"Yeah, the first one, they said the bead blew on it. We don't have any brake temp here, so I don't know what could have caused that. That's kind of a freak deal. The second one, it went soft. So there could have been some damage that caused it or some rub or something like that, and it went soft going into Turn 3 and I hit the wall, unfortunately. I'm disappointed. We certainly had an awesome race car. I wish we could have won this Kobalt race in this Kobalt car, but we'll come back next week."

— Jimmie Johnson, commenting on his crash.

The race restarted on lap 178. The fifth caution flew with 82 laps to go when Jimmie Johnson blew another right-front tire and again hit the wall again in turn 4. Upon exiting his car, Johnson explained that on the first puncture, his team believed that "the bead blew on it", while on the second puncture, the tire "went soft going into Turn 3 and I hit the wall, unfortunately". Joey Logano was again sent to the back of the line, for speeding on pit road. The race restarted with 75 laps to go. Carl Edwards pushed Kasey Kahne into the wall exiting turn 4. Kahne, in retaliation, turned down on Edwards in turn 1 and sent him spinning, bringing out the sixth caution of the race with 74 to go. During the period, Aric Almirola was again caught speeding on pit road.

==== Final stops ====
The race restarted with 69 laps to go and Dale Earnhardt Jr. took back the lead. He would lose it two laps later to Harvick. He made his final stop with 37 laps to go and handed the lead to Ryan Newman. He went until 25 laps to go before pitting and handing the lead to Brad Keselowski. He pitted with 17 laps to go and Kevin Harvick cycled back to the lead and coasted to his 29th career victory.

== Post-race ==
=== Driver comments ===
Harvick felt that it was "so cool to win here in Las Vegas and start this West Coast swing off this way is pretty awesome" and that he was "glad the race is over at that particular point for our own good".

=== Post-race penalties ===
The No. 51 team was penalized for a rules infraction discovered during post-race inspection March 8 at Las Vegas Motor Speedway. This infraction is a P3 level penalty and violates the following Sections in the 2015 NASCAR rule book:

- 12.1: Actions detrimental to stock car racing;
- 20.3.5: Added ballast containers:
  - a. Any and all ballast added to the vehicle must be bolted inside an added ballast container, inside the main frame rails, and/or inside the front sway bar.
  - b. Added ballast must be secured in a manner that will prevent movement of the ballast during an event.
- 20.17.2.2: Overall vehicle weight after competition:
  - b. After a vehicle has raced, only water in the radiator, oil in the engine reservoir tank, and fuel in the fuel cell may be added. Wheels and tires may not be changed, unless otherwise authorized by NASCAR Officials.
  - c. After a vehicle has raced, the minimum overall vehicle weight of all vehicles must be within 0.5% of the minimum overall vehicle weight required at the start of the race.

Ballast was observed falling off the No. 51 car during the race and the No. 51 car did not meet post-race minimum weight requirements. As a result of the violation, crew chief Steve Addington was fined $25,000.

The No. 2 team was penalized for a rules infraction committed when it was discovered that the right and left rear quarter panel wheel openings were modified after qualifying inspection on March 6. This infraction is a P2 level penalty and violates the following Sections in the 2015 NASCAR rule book:

- 12.1: Actions detrimental to stock car racing;
- 20.4.b: Body – All approved OEM-manufactured body components must be used as supplied except as required to stiffen, or to attach to other vehicle components. Tolerances from CAD surfaces and template tolerances are provided to allow for manufacturing, fabrication, and installation variability;
- 20.4.2: Surface Conformance – Coordinate measuring machines, scanning equipment, and templates, among other tools, will be used to inspect body surfaces for conformance to the approved OEM and NASCAR CAD files.

As a result of this violation, crew chief Paul Wolfe was placed on NASCAR probation through December 31.

== Race results ==
Pos	No.	Driver	Team	Manufacturer	Laps	Points
1	4	Kevin Harvick	Stewart–Haas Racing	Chevrolet	267	48
2	78	Martin Truex Jr.	Furniture Row Racing	Chevrolet	267	43
3	31	Ryan Newman	Richard Childress Racing	Chevrolet	267	42
4	88	Dale Earnhardt Jr.	Hendrick Motorsports	Chevrolet	267	41
5	11	Denny Hamlin	Joe Gibbs Racing	Toyota	267	39
6	47	A. J. Allmendinger	JTG Daugherty Racing	Chevrolet	267	38
7	2	Brad Keselowski	Team Penske	Ford	267	38
8	42	Kyle Larson	Chip Ganassi Racing	Chevrolet	267	36
9	20	Matt Kenseth	Joe Gibbs Racing	Toyota	267	36
10	22	Joey Logano	Team Penske	Ford	267	35
11	1	Jamie McMurray	Chip Ganassi Racing	Chevrolet	267	33
12	27	Paul Menard	Richard Childress Racing	Chevrolet	267	32
13	33	Brian Scott	Richard Childress Racing	Chevrolet	267	0
14	16	Greg Biffle	Roush Fenway Racing	Ford	266	30
15	55	Brian Vickers	Michael Waltrip Racing	Toyota	266	29
16	41	Regan Smith	Stewart–Haas Racing	Chevrolet	266	0
17	5	Kasey Kahne	Hendrick Motorsports	Chevrolet	266	27
18	24	Jeff Gordon	Hendrick Motorsports	Chevrolet	266	26
19	21	Ryan Blaney	Wood Brothers Racing	Ford	266	0
20	3	Austin Dillon	Richard Childress Racing	Chevrolet	265	24
21	15	Clint Bowyer	Michael Waltrip Racing	Toyota	265	23
22	18	David Ragan	Joe Gibbs Racing	Toyota	265	22
23	38	David Gilliland	Front Row Motorsports	Ford	265	21
24	9	Sam Hornish Jr.	Richard Petty Motorsports	Ford	265	20
25	13	Casey Mears	Germain Racing	Chevrolet	264	19
26	43	Aric Almirola	Richard Petty Motorsports	Ford	264	18
27	10	Danica Patrick	Stewart–Haas Racing	Chevrolet	264	17
28	6	Trevor Bayne	Roush Fenway Racing	Ford	264	16
29	17	Ricky Stenhouse Jr.	Roush Fenway Racing	Ford	264	15
30	95	Michael McDowell	Leavine Family Racing	Ford	264	14
31	51	Justin Allgaier	HScott Motorsports	Chevrolet	263	13
32	35	Cole Whitt	Front Row Motorsports	Ford	262	12
33	14	Tony Stewart	Stewart–Haas Racing	Chevrolet	262	11
34	98	Josh Wise	Phil Parsons Racing	Ford	261	10
35	40	Landon Cassill	Hillman Smith Motorsports	Chevrolet	261	0
36	23	J. J. Yeley	BK Racing	Toyota	260	0
37	34	Brett Moffitt (R)	Front Row Motorsports	Ford	260	7
38	62	Brendan Gaughan	Premium Motorsports	Chevrolet	258	0
39	46	Michael Annett	HScott Motorsports	Chevrolet	257	5
40	26	Jeb Burton (R)	BK Racing	Toyota	254	4
41	48	Jimmie Johnson	Hendrick Motorsports	Chevrolet	236	4
42	19	Carl Edwards	Joe Gibbs Racing	Toyota	227	3
43	7	Alex Bowman	Tommy Baldwin Racing	Chevrolet	29	1
Official Kobalt 400 results

=== Race statistics ===
- 18 lead changes among 9 different drivers
- 6 cautions for 28 laps
- Time of race: 2 hours, 47 minutes, 15 seconds
- Average speed: 143.677 mph (231.226 km/h)
- Kevin Harvick took home $442,415 in winnings

Lap Leaders
Laps	Leader
1–27	Joey Logano
28–29	Dale Earnhardt Jr.
30–42	Joey Logano
43–76	Jimmie Johnson
77–78	Carl Edwards
79	Matt Kenseth
80–90	Jimmie Johnson
91–130	Kevin Harvick
131–132	Brad Keselowski
133–139	Joey Logano
140–144	Kevin Harvick
145–147	Martin Truex Jr.
148–198	Kevin Harvick
199–200	Dale Earnhardt Jr.
201–230	Kevin Harvick
231–244	Ryan Newman
245–251	Brad Keselowski
252–267	Kevin Harvick

Total laps led
Leader	Laps
Kevin Harvick	142
Joey Logano	47
Jimmie Johnson	45
Ryan Newman	14
Brad Keselowski	9
Dale Earnhardt Jr.	4
Martin Truex Jr.	3
Carl Edwards	2
Matt Kenseth	1

==== Race awards ====
- Coors Light Pole Award: Jeff Gordon (27.738, 194.679 mph (313.305 km/h))
- 3M Lap Leader: Kevin Harvick (142 laps)
- American Ethanol Green Flag Restart Award: Kevin Harvick (30.537, 176.833 mph (284.585 km/h))
- Duralast Brakes "Brake in The Race" Award: Jeff Gordon
- Freescale "Wide Open": Kevin Harvick
- Ingersoll Rand Power Move: Austin Dillon, 8 positions
- MAHLE Clevite Engine Builder of the Race: Hendrick Engines, #4
- Mobil 1 Driver of the Race: Kevin Harvick (141.5 driver rating)
- Moog Steering and Suspension Problem Solver of The Race: Kevin Harvick (crew chief Rodney Childers, 0.306 seconds)
- NASCAR Sprint Cup Leader Bonus: Kevin Harvick: $30,000
- Sherwin-Williams Fastest Lap: Kyle Larson (Lap 2, 29.285, 184.397 mph (296.758 km/h))
- Sunoco Rookie of The Race: Jeb Burton

== Media ==
=== Television ===
Fox Sports covered their fifteenth race at the Las Vegas Motor Speedway. Mike Joy, Larry McReynolds, and Darrell Waltrip had the call in the booth for the race. Jamie Little, Chris Neville, and Matt Yocum handled the pit road duties for the television side.

Fox
Booth announcers	Pit reporters
Lap-by-lap: Mike Joy; Color-commentator: Larry McReynolds; Color commentator: Darrell Waltrip	Jamie Little; Chris Neville; Matt Yocum

=== Radio ===
PRN had the radio call for the race which was also simulcast on Sirius XM NASCAR Radio. Doug Rice, Mark Garrow, and Wendy Venturini called the race in the booth when the field is racing through the tri-oval. Rob Albright called the race from a billboard in turn 2 when the field went racing through turns 1 and 2 and halfway down the backstretch. Pat Patterson called the race from a billboard outside of turn 3 when the field raced through the other half of the backstretch and through turns 3 and 4. Brad Gillie, Brett McMillan, Jim Noble, and Steve Richards worked pit road for the radio side.

PRN
Booth announcers	Turn announcers	Pit reporters
Lead announcer: Doug Rice; Announcer: Mark Garrow; Announcer: Wendy Venturini	Turns 1 & 2: Rob Albright; Turns 3 & 4: Pat Patterson	Brad Gillie; Brett McMillan; Jim Noble; Steve Richards

== Standings after the race ==
Drivers' Championship standings

	Pos	Driver	Points
2	1	Kevin Harvick	134
2	2	Dale Earnhardt Jr.	125 (−9)
2	3	Joey Logano	123 (−11)
1	4	Martin Truex Jr.	118 (−16)
3	5	A. J. Allmendinger	100 (−34)
1	6	Kasey Kahne	92 (−42)
5	7	Jimmie Johnson	91 (−43)
11	8	Denny Hamlin	87 (−47)
3	9	Casey Mears	87 (−47)
8	10	Matt Kenseth	85 (−49)
2	11	Greg Biffle	84 (−50)
9	12	Ryan Newman	82 (−52)
4	13	Paul Menard	82 (−52)
4	14	Clint Bowyer	81 (−53)
6	15	Aric Almirola	80 (−54)
6	16	Brad Keselowski	77 (−57)

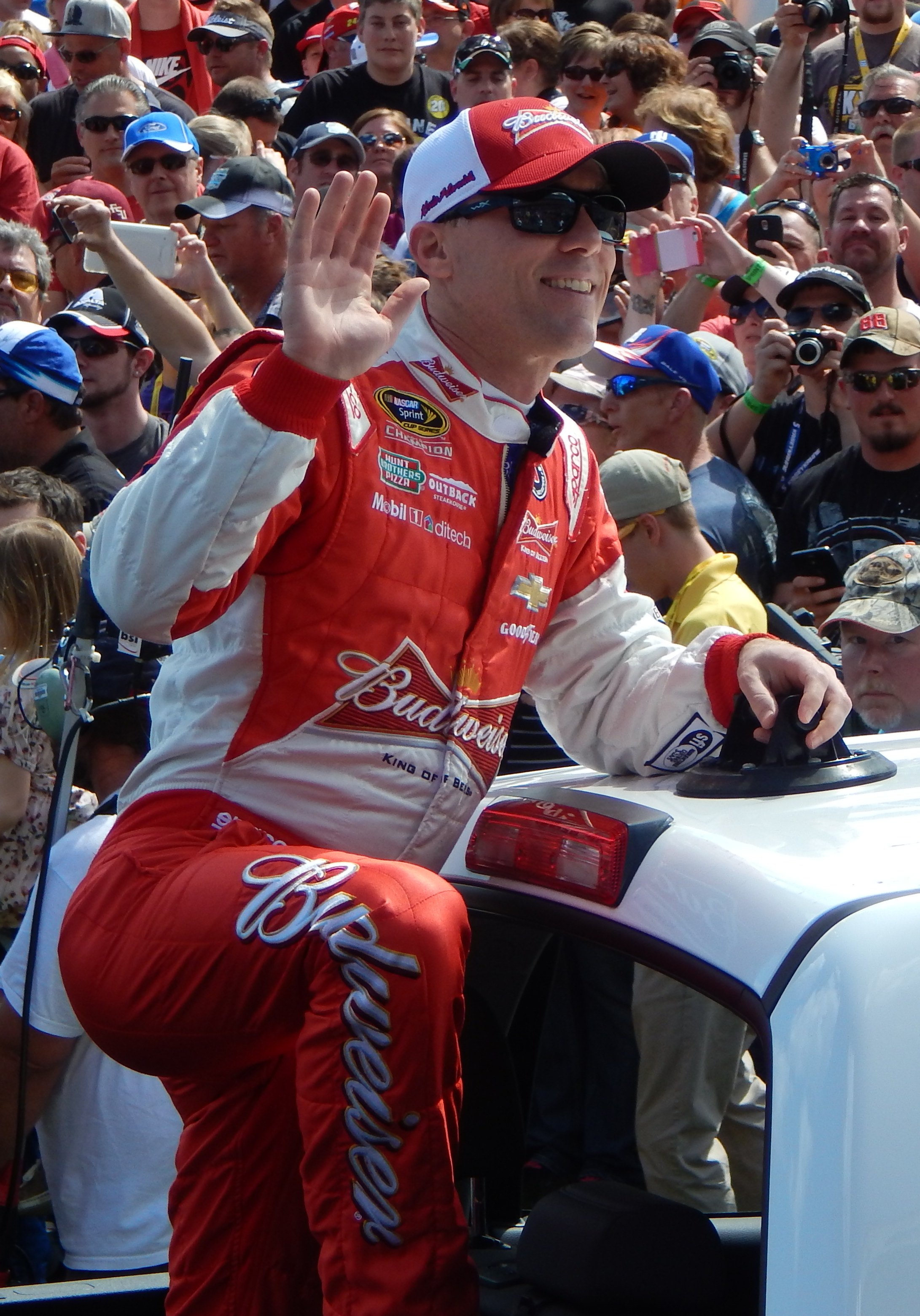
Kevin Harvick left Las Vegas with a nine-point lead over Dale Earnhardt Jr.

Manufacturers' Championship standings

Pos	Manufacturer	Points
1	Chevrolet	137
2	Ford	126 (−11)
3	Toyota	120 (−17)

- Note: Only the first sixteen positions are included for the driver standings.

== Notes ==
Previous race: 2015 Folds of Honor QuikTrip 500	Sprint Cup Series; 2015 season	Next race: 2015 CampingWorld.com 500
