= 2015 CampingWorld.com 500 =

Race details
- Race 4 of 36 in the 2015 NASCAR Sprint Cup Series
- Date: March 15, 2015
- Location: Phoenix International Raceway in Avondale, Arizona
- Course: Permanent racing facility
- Course length: 1 miles (1.6 km)
- Distance: 312 laps, 312 mi (502.115 km)
- Weather: Clear skies with a temperature of 83 °F (28 °C); wind out of the east at 10 mph (16 km/h)
- Average speed: 105.753 mph (170.193 km/h)

Pole position
Driver	Kevin Harvick	Stewart–Haas Racing
- Time: 25.577

Most laps led
Driver	Kevin Harvick	Stewart–Haas Racing
- Laps: 224

Winner
No. 4	Kevin Harvick	Stewart–Haas Racing

Television in the United States
- Network: Fox
- Announcers: Mike Joy, Larry McReynolds and Darrell Waltrip
- Nielsen ratings: 3.8/7 (Overnight); 4.1/8 (Final); 7.0 Million viewers

Radio in the United States
- Radio: MRN
- Booth announcers: Joe Moore and Jeff Striegle
- Turn announcers: Dan Hubbard (1 & 2) and Buddy Long (3 & 4)

The 2015 CampingWorld.com 500 was a NASCAR Sprint Cup Series race that was held on March 15, 2015, at Phoenix International Raceway in Avondale, Arizona. Contested over 312 laps on the 1 mile (1.6 km) asphalt oval, it was the fourth race of the 2015 NASCAR Sprint Cup Series season. Kevin Harvick won the race, his second of the season, while Jamie McMurray finished second. Ryan Newman, Kasey Kahne and Kurt Busch rounded out the top five.

Harvick won the pole for the race and led a race high of 224 laps, en route to a 30th career victory and his seventh at Phoenix. The race had eight lead changes among four different drivers, as well as ten caution flag periods for 53 laps.

Recording the fourth win at the track for Stewart–Haas Racing, Harvick increased his points lead over Joey Logano to 22. Chevrolet increased their lead over Ford to 20 points in the manufacturers' standings.

The CampingWorld.com 500 was carried by Fox Sports on the broadcast Fox network for the American television audience. The radio broadcast of the race was carried by the Motor Racing Network and Sirius XM NASCAR Radio.

== Report ==
=== Background ===
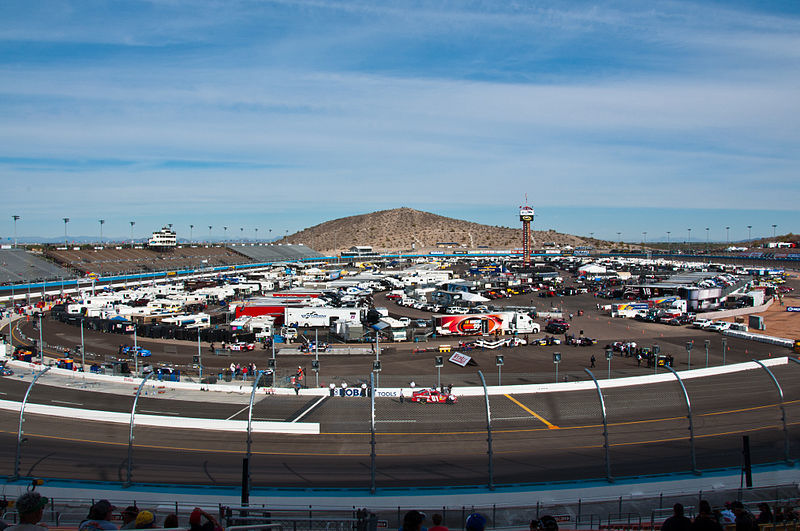
Phoenix International Raceway was the site of the fourth race of the season

Phoenix International Raceway, also known as PIR, is a one-mile, low-banked tri-oval race track located in Avondale, Arizona. The motorsport track opened in 1964 and currently hosts two NASCAR race weekends annually. PIR has also hosted the IndyCar Series, CART, USAC and the Rolex Sports Car Series. The raceway is currently owned and operated by International Speedway Corporation.

Kevin Harvick entered Phoenix with a nine-point lead over Dale Earnhardt Jr. following his win the week before at Las Vegas. Joey Logano entered eleven points back of Harvick in third, with Martin Truex Jr. a further five points back in fourth. A. J. Allmendinger entered 34 points back in fifth.

==== New inspection rule ====
Following the inspection issues during qualifying at Atlanta Motor Speedway two weeks prior, NASCAR implemented a new technical inspection rule from Phoenix onwards. Instead of teams rolling through the laser inspection platform multiple times until passing, they will now only get two attempts to pass without consequence. Should they fail both times, the car will be forced to sit on pit road for 15 minutes in the next practice session before being allowed to go on track. Also, if a car fails its first attempt, it must wait until all the other cars have gone through the station at least once.

==== Entry list ====
No.	Driver	Team	Manufacturer
1	Jamie McMurray	Chip Ganassi Racing	Chevrolet
2	Brad Keselowski (PC3)	Team Penske	Ford
3	Austin Dillon	Richard Childress Racing	Chevrolet
4	Kevin Harvick (PC1)	Stewart–Haas Racing	Chevrolet
5	Kasey Kahne	Hendrick Motorsports	Chevrolet
6	Trevor Bayne	Roush Fenway Racing	Ford
7	Alex Bowman	Tommy Baldwin Racing	Chevrolet
9	Sam Hornish Jr.	Richard Petty Motorsports	Ford
10	Danica Patrick	Stewart–Haas Racing	Chevrolet
11	Denny Hamlin	Joe Gibbs Racing	Toyota
13	Casey Mears	Germain Racing	Chevrolet
14	Tony Stewart (PC4)	Stewart–Haas Racing	Chevrolet
15	Clint Bowyer	Michael Waltrip Racing	Toyota
16	Greg Biffle	Roush Fenway Racing	Ford
17	Ricky Stenhouse Jr.	Roush Fenway Racing	Ford
18	David Ragan	Joe Gibbs Racing	Toyota
19	Carl Edwards	Joe Gibbs Racing	Toyota
20	Matt Kenseth (PC6)	Joe Gibbs Racing	Toyota
22	Joey Logano	Team Penske	Ford
23	J. J. Yeley (i)	BK Racing	Toyota
24	Jeff Gordon (PC7)	Hendrick Motorsports	Chevrolet
26	Jeb Burton (R)	BK Racing	Toyota
27	Paul Menard	Richard Childress Racing	Chevrolet
31	Ryan Newman	Richard Childress Racing	Chevrolet
32	Mike Bliss (i)	Go FAS Racing	Ford
33	Alex Kennedy	Hillman–Circle Sport	Chevrolet
34	Brett Moffitt (R)	Front Row Motorsports	Ford
35	Cole Whitt	Front Row Motorsports	Ford
38	David Gilliland	Front Row Motorsports	Ford
40	Landon Cassill (i)	Hillman–Circle Sport	Chevrolet
41	Kurt Busch (PC5)	Stewart–Haas Racing	Chevrolet
42	Kyle Larson	Chip Ganassi Racing	Chevrolet
43	Aric Almirola	Richard Petty Motorsports	Ford
44	Travis Kvapil (i)	Team XTREME Racing	Chevrolet
46	Michael Annett	HScott Motorsports	Chevrolet
47	A. J. Allmendinger	JTG Daugherty Racing	Chevrolet
48	Jimmie Johnson (PC2)	Hendrick Motorsports	Chevrolet
51	Justin Allgaier	HScott Motorsports	Chevrolet
55	Brian Vickers	Michael Waltrip Racing	Toyota
62	Brendan Gaughan (i)	Premium Motorsports	Chevrolet
66	Tanner Berryhill (i)	Premium Motorsports	Chevrolet
78	Martin Truex Jr.	Furniture Row Racing	Chevrolet
83	Matt DiBenedetto (R)	BK Racing	Toyota
88	Dale Earnhardt Jr.	Hendrick Motorsports	Chevrolet
98	Josh Wise	Phil Parsons Racing	Ford
Official initial entry list
Official updated entry list

Key	Meaning
(R)	Rookie
(i)	Ineligible for points
(PC#)	Past champions provisional

== First practice ==
Joey Logano was the fastest in the first practice session with a time of 25.942 and a speed of 138.771 mph (223.330 km/h). Kurt Busch making his first start since returning from a three-week suspension, was 17th fastest with a time of 26.222 and a speed 137.289 mph (220.945 km/h).

Pos	No.	Driver	Team	Manufacturer	Time	Speed
1	22	Joey Logano	Team Penske	Ford	25.942	138.771
2	2	Brad Keselowski	Team Penske	Ford	25.946	138.750
3	5	Kasey Kahne	Hendrick Motorsports	Chevrolet	26.007	138.424
Official first practice results

== Qualifying ==
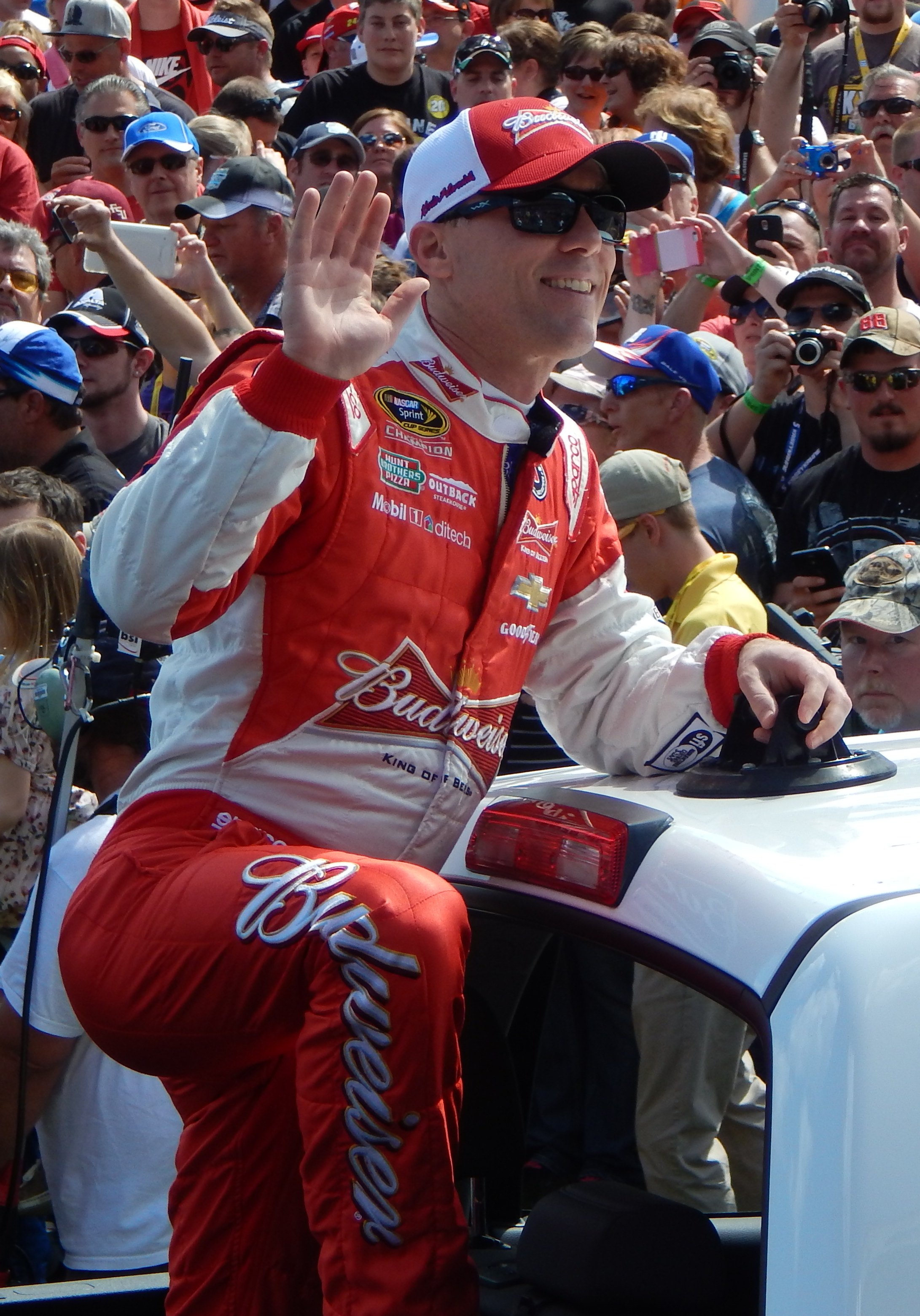
Kevin Harvick, seen here at the 2015 Daytona 500, scored his 15th career pole at Phoenix International Raceway.

Kevin Harvick won the pole with a time of 25.577 and a speed of 140.751 mph (226.517 km/h). He commented that he felt Phoenix International Raceway "is a pretty special place [...] for the fact that [he and his family] used to bring [their] Southwest Tour cars here and [their] Winston West cars" and that it was "pretty special to be a part of a group of guys like this". Third place qualifier Jamie McMurray felt that he did "everything perfect, but ended up 0.060 seconds behind Harvick". In his first race coming off a three-week suspension, Kurt Busch qualified eighth with a time of 25.776 and a speed of 139.665 mph (224.769 km/h). He was delighted to "get back in the seat and shake hands with all the guys" and that "the car seems fast".

=== Qualifying results ===
Pos	No.	Driver	Team	Manufacturer	R1	R2	R3
1	4	Kevin Harvick	Stewart–Haas Racing	Chevrolet	26.074	25.616	25.577
2	22	Joey Logano	Team Penske	Ford	26.142	25.654	25.615
3	1	Jamie McMurray	Chip Ganassi Racing	Chevrolet	25.977	25.735	25.637
4	20	Matt Kenseth	Joe Gibbs Racing	Toyota	25.991	25.707	25.701
5	31	Ryan Newman	Richard Childress Racing	Chevrolet	25.949	25.746	25.745
6	2	Brad Keselowski	Team Penske	Ford	26.111	25.738	25.748
7	19	Carl Edwards	Joe Gibbs Racing	Toyota	26.088	25.729	25.755
8	41	Kurt Busch	Stewart–Haas Racing	Chevrolet	25.969	25.794	25.776
9	5	Kasey Kahne	Hendrick Motorsports	Chevrolet	25.963	25.639	25.780
10	24	Jeff Gordon	Hendrick Motorsports	Chevrolet	26.115	25.854	25.800
11	3	Austin Dillon	Richard Childress Racing	Chevrolet	26.046	25.855	25.905
12	42	Kyle Larson	Chip Ganassi Racing	Chevrolet	26.010	25.806	25.945
13	18	David Ragan	Joe Gibbs Racing	Toyota	25.922	25.870	—
14	17	Ricky Stenhouse Jr.	Roush Fenway Racing	Ford	26.094	25.873	—
15	78	Martin Truex Jr.	Furniture Row Racing	Chevrolet	26.170	25.921	—
16	88	Dale Earnhardt Jr.	Hendrick Motorsports	Chevrolet	26.009	25.934	—
17	14	Tony Stewart	Stewart–Haas Racing	Chevrolet	26.067	25.952	—
18	55	Brian Vickers	Michael Waltrip Racing	Toyota	26.041	25.964	—
19	16	Greg Biffle	Roush Fenway Racing	Ford	26.041	25.990	—
20	48	Jimmie Johnson	Hendrick Motorsports	Chevrolet	26.080	25.996	—
21	27	Paul Menard	Richard Childress Racing	Chevrolet	26.074	25.997	—
22	47	A. J. Allmendinger (Note: A. J. Allmendinger changed engines during the final practice session. As a result, he started from the rear of the field.)	JTG Daugherty Racing	Chevrolet	26.060	26.006	—
23	10	Danica Patrick	Stewart–Haas Racing	Chevrolet	26.124	26.031	—
24	13	Casey Mears	Germain Racing	Chevrolet	26.158	26.113	—
25	11	Denny Hamlin	Joe Gibbs Racing	Toyota	26.170	—	—
26	7	Alex Bowman	Tommy Baldwin Racing	Chevrolet	26.208	—	—
27	9	Sam Hornish Jr.	Richard Petty Motorsports	Ford	26.237	—	—
28	51	Justin Allgaier	HScott Motorsports	Chevrolet	26.340	—	—
29	38	David Gilliland	Front Row Motorsports	Ford	26.357	—	—
30	15	Clint Bowyer	Michael Waltrip Racing	Toyota	26.364	—	—
31	46	Michael Annett	HScott Motorsports	Chevrolet	26.380	—	—
32	43	Aric Almirola	Richard Petty Motorsports	Ford	26.392	—	—
33	40	Landon Cassill (i)	Hillman–Circle Sport	Chevrolet	26.419	—	—
34	98	Josh Wise	Phil Parsons Racing	Ford	26.423	—	—
35	83	Matt DiBenedetto (R)	BK Racing	Toyota	26.503	—	—
36	6	Trevor Bayne	Roush Fenway Racing	Ford	26.534	—	—
37	32	Mike Bliss (i)	Go FAS Racing	Ford	26.645	—	—
38	34	Brett Moffitt (R)	Front Row Motorsports	Ford	26.661	—	—
39	35	Cole Whitt	Front Row Motorsports	Ford	26.677	—	—
40	23	J. J. Yeley (i)	BK Racing	Toyota	26.741	—	—
41	26	Jeb Burton (R)	BK Racing	Toyota	26.784	—	—
42	62	Brendan Gaughan (i)	Premium Motorsports	Chevrolet	26.983	—	—
43	33	Alex Kennedy	Hillman–Circle Sport	Chevrolet	27.207	—	—
Failed to qualify
44	66	Tanner Berryhill	Premium Motorsports	Chevrolet	27.163	—	—
45	44	Travis Kvapil (i)	Team XTREME Racing	Chevrolet	27.255	—	—
Official qualifying results

== Practice (post-qualifying) ==
=== Second practice ===
Kurt Busch was the fastest in the second practice session with a time of 26.322 and a speed of 136.768 mph (220.107 km/h).

Pos	No.	Driver	Team	Manufacturer	Time	Speed
1	41	Kurt Busch	Stewart–Haas Racing	Chevrolet	26.322	136.768
2	2	Brad Keselowski	Team Penske	Ford	26.397	136.379
3	4	Kevin Harvick	Stewart–Haas Racing	Chevrolet	26.432	136.199
Official second practice results

=== Final practice ===
Kevin Harvick was the fastest in the final practice session with a time of 26.363 and a speed of 136.555 mph (219.764 km/h). A. J. Allmendinger changed engines during this session and was forced to start from the rear. Allmendinger commented that his JTG Daugherty Racing team "saw something they didn't like" and that they "have just got to make the Kingsford Chevy better". Allmendinger's crew chief, Brian Burns, stated that the team "didn't qualify as well as we wanted to anyway, so we decided to take the opportunity to change it now and eliminate any doubts" and that they were "just taking some precautionary measures to make sure we are good to go to the end".

Pos	No.	Driver	Team	Manufacturer	Time	Speed
1	4	Kevin Harvick	Stewart–Haas Racing	Chevrolet	26.363	136.555
2	20	Matt Kenseth	Joe Gibbs Racing	Toyota	26.412	136.302
3	41	Kurt Busch	Stewart–Haas Racing	Chevrolet	26.414	136.291
Official final practice results

== Race ==
=== First-half ===
The race was scheduled to start at 3:45 p.m. but started three minutes later and Kevin Harvick led the field to the green. However, he did not lead the first lap as Joey Logano, on the inside line, passed him to lead the first lap. Coming to the line, Brian Vickers was turned into the wall by Jimmie Johnson, destroying the wheel axle of Vickers' car and he hit the wall in turn 1, bringing out the race's first caution period. Upon exiting his car in the garage, Vickers stated that it was "a shame" to hit the wall, and pointed out that, in his opinion, it was "kind of early to be using the bumper". The race restarted on lap six with Logano leading the way. It ran green for another ten laps before the second caution of the race flew for Alex Kennedy cutting down a tire and spinning in turn 4.

The race restarted on lap 20, with Logano and Harvick battling for the lead. Logano held the lead until lap 25, when Harvick re-assumed first place. Harvick led the next segment of the race, and on lap 49, he led his one-thousandth lap in races at Phoenix International Raceway, the most of any driver. Debris in turn 1 brought out the third caution on lap 67. Denny Hamlin was forced to drop to the tail end of the field for his crew being over the wall too soon. The race restarted on lap 72, and over the course of the following 30 laps, Harvick pulled out to a 2.5-second lead over Logano. The fourth caution of the race flew on lap 117 after Sam Hornish Jr. had a right-rear tire blowout and spun out on the backstretch. Brad Keselowski took just two tires and exited pit road with the lead, while Dale Earnhardt Jr. dropped to the tail end of the field, after he was caught speeding on pit road. The race restarted on lap 126. Kevin Harvick restarted the race eighth and drove his way back to second by lap 157.

=== Second-half ===
==== Restart after Caution 4 ====
Harvick finally caught Keselowski and passed him for the lead on lap 172. The fifth caution of the race flew on lap 181 when Earnhardt Jr. blew his right-rear tire and backed into the wall in turn 2. Earnhardt stated that his car was "really, really loose today and just wore the right rear tire out, and blew the tire". He drove his car to his pit stall while leaving a trail of fuel along the way, keeping pit road closed for six laps for clean up. Logano exited pit road with the lead thanks to taking two tires, while Matt Kenseth dropped to the rear of the field, after he was caught speeding. The race restarted on lap 192, and once again, Logano and Harvick duked it out for the race lead. Logano maintained the lead until lap 199, when Harvick's four-tire pit strategy allowed him to take the lead, just before the sixth caution of the race flew for debris on the front stretch. The race restarted on lap 205, before debris in the dogleg brought out the seventh caution of the race with 86 laps to go.

==== Trouble for Tony Stewart ====
The race restarted with 79 laps to go, but just as the field headed into turn 4, Tony Stewart spun out and hit the wall, bringing out the eighth caution. The race restarted with 71 laps to go, and Kurt Busch tried to keep with Stewart–Haas Racing teammate Harvick, but Harvick maintained station at the head of the race. The ninth caution of the race flew with 24 laps to go when Stewart had a right-front tire blowout and hit the wall exiting turn 4, and collected Hornish. Nine drivers – including Harvick – opted not to pit while Busch and Jeff Gordon did. The race restarted with 17 laps to go, but the yellow flag flew – for the tenth time – before a lap could be completed, when Danica Patrick came down on David Ragan and got turned in turn 4.

==== Finish ====
The race restarted with twelve laps to go and Harvick drove away from the field to score his seventh victory at the track.

== Post-race ==
=== Driver comments ===
Harvick stated that Phoenix "is a really special place of all these West Coast races for us to win" while stating that his car was "incredible and really fun to drive". Kurt Busch scored a top five finish in his first start of the season, stating he has "a strong team, and personally, it's great to get back to them", while also expressing that "the way we raced today was with heart".

== Race results ==
Pos	No.	Driver	Team	Manufacturer	Laps	Points
1	4	Kevin Harvick	Stewart–Haas Racing	Chevrolet	312	48
2	1	Jamie McMurray	Chip Ganassi Racing	Chevrolet	312	43
3	31	Ryan Newman	Richard Childress Racing	Chevrolet	312	41
4	5	Kasey Kahne	Hendrick Motorsports	Chevrolet	312	40
5	41	Kurt Busch	Stewart–Haas Racing	Chevrolet	312	39
6	2	Brad Keselowski	Team Penske	Ford	312	39
7	78	Martin Truex Jr.	Furniture Row Racing	Chevrolet	312	37
8	22	Joey Logano	Team Penske	Ford	312	37
9	24	Jeff Gordon	Hendrick Motorsports	Chevrolet	312	35
10	42	Kyle Larson	Chip Ganassi Racing	Chevrolet	312	34
11	48	Jimmie Johnson	Hendrick Motorsports	Chevrolet	312	33
12	17	Ricky Stenhouse Jr.	Roush Fenway Racing	Ford	312	32
13	19	Carl Edwards	Joe Gibbs Racing	Toyota	312	31
14	27	Paul Menard	Richard Childress Racing	Chevrolet	312	30
15	3	Austin Dillon	Richard Childress Racing	Chevrolet	312	29
16	20	Matt Kenseth	Joe Gibbs Racing	Toyota	312	28
17	47	A. J. Allmendinger	JTG Daugherty Racing	Chevrolet	312	27
18	51	Justin Allgaier	HScott Motorsports	Chevrolet	312	26
19	43	Aric Almirola	Richard Petty Motorsports	Ford	312	25
20	13	Casey Mears	Germain Racing	Chevrolet	312	24
21	18	David Ragan	Joe Gibbs Racing	Toyota	312	23
22	40	Landon Cassill (i)	Hillman–Circle Sport	Chevrolet	312	0
23	11	Denny Hamlin	Joe Gibbs Racing	Toyota	312	21
24	15	Clint Bowyer	Michael Waltrip Racing	Toyota	312	20
25	35	Cole Whitt	Front Row Motorsports	Ford	312	19
26	10	Danica Patrick	Stewart–Haas Racing	Chevrolet	312	18
27	16	Greg Biffle	Roush Fenway Racing	Ford	312	17
28	6	Trevor Bayne	Roush Fenway Racing	Ford	309	16
29	38	David Gilliland	Front Row Motorsports	Ford	309	15
30	7	Alex Bowman	Tommy Baldwin Racing	Chevrolet	309	14
31	23	J. J. Yeley (i)	BK Racing	Toyota	309	0
32	34	Brett Moffitt (R)	Front Row Motorsports	Ford	309	12
33	32	Mike Bliss (i)	Go FAS Racing	Ford	308	0
34	26	Jeb Burton (R)	BK Racing	Toyota	307	10
35	83	Matt DiBenedetto (R)	BK Racing	Toyota	307	9
36	98	Josh Wise	Phil Parsons Racing	Ford	306	8
37	62	Brendan Gaughan (i)	Premium Motorsports	Chevrolet	306	0
38	33	Alex Kennedy	Hillman–Circle Sport	Chevrolet	304	6
39	14	Tony Stewart	Stewart–Haas Racing	Chevrolet	282	5
40	9	Sam Hornish Jr.	Richard Petty Motorsports	Ford	277	4
41	55	Brian Vickers	Michael Waltrip Racing	Toyota	230	3
42	46	Michael Annett	HScott Motorsports	Chevrolet	202	2
43	88	Dale Earnhardt Jr.	Hendrick Motorsports	Chevrolet	179	1
Official CampingWorld.com 500 results

=== Race statistics ===
- 8 lead changes among 4 different drivers
- 10 cautions for 53 laps
- Time of race: 2 hours, 57 minutes, 1 second
- Average speed: 105.753 mph (170.193 km/h)
- Kevin Harvick took home $263,090 in winnings

Lap Leaders
Laps	Leader
1–25	Joey Logano
26–118	Kevin Harvick
119–170	Brad Keselowski
171–188	Kevin Harvick
189–198	Joey Logano
199–294	Kevin Harvick
295	Jamie McMurray
296–312	Kevin Harvick

Total laps led
Leader	Laps
Kevin Harvick	224
Brad Keselowski	52
Joey Logano	35
Jamie McMurray	1

==== Race awards ====
- Coors Light Pole Award: Kevin Harvick (25.577, 140.751 mph (226.517 km/h))
- 3M Lap Leader: Kevin Harvick (224 laps)
- American Ethanol Green Flag Restart Award: Kevin Harvick (27.854 130.510 mph (210.035 km/h))
- Duralast Brakes "Brake in The Race" Award: Joey Logano
- Freescale "Wide Open": Kurt Busch
- Ingersoll Rand Power Move: Paul Menard, 4 positions
- MAHLE Clevite Engine Builder of the Race: Hendrick Engines, #4
- Mobil 1 Driver of the Race: Kevin Harvick (150.0 driver rating (perfect driver rating))
- Moog Steering and Suspension Problem Solver of The Race: Kurt Busch (crew chief Tony Gibson, 0.087 seconds)
- NASCAR Sprint Cup Leader Bonus: Kevin Harvick ($10,000)
- Sherwin-Williams Fastest Lap: Matt Kenseth (Lap 12, 26.618, 135.246 mph (217.657 km/h))
- Sunoco Rookie of The Race: Jeb Burton

== Media ==
=== Television ===
Fox Sports covered their eleventh race at the Phoenix International Raceway. Mike Joy, Larry McReynolds, and Darrell Waltrip had the call in the booth for the race. Jamie Little, Chris Neville, and Matt Yocum handled the pit road duties for the television side.

Fox
Booth announcers	Pit reporters
Lap-by-lap: Mike Joy; Color-commentator: Larry McReynolds; Color commentator: Darrell Waltrip	Jamie Little; Chris Neville; Matt Yocum

=== Radio ===
MRN had the radio call for the race which was also simulcast on Sirius XM NASCAR Radio. Joe Moore, Jeff Striegle, and 1998 race winner Rusty Wallace called the race in the booth when the field was racing down the front stretch. Dan Hubbard called the race from atop the suites that line the turn 1 grandstands when the field was racing through turns 1 and 2. Buddy Long called the race from a scaffold outside turn 4 when the field was racing through turns 3 and 4. Woody Cain, Alex Hayden, Glenn Jarrett, and Kyle Rickey worked pit road for MRN.

MRN
Booth announcers	Turn announcers	Pit reporters
Lead announcer: Joe Moore; Announcer: Jeff Striegle; Announcer: Rusty Wallace	Turns 1 & 2: Dan Hubbard; Turns 3 & 4: Buddy Long	Woody Cain; Alex Hayden; Glenn Jarrett; Kyle Rickey

== Standings after the race ==
Drivers' Championship standings

	Pos	Driver	Points
	1	Kevin Harvick	182
1	2	Joey Logano	160 (−22)
1	3	Martin Truex Jr.	155 (−27)
2	4	Kasey Kahne	132 (−50)
	5	A. J. Allmendinger	127 (−55)
4	6	Dale Earnhardt Jr.	126 (−56)
	7	Jimmie Johnson	124 (−58)
4	8	Ryan Newman	123 (−59)
7	9	Brad Keselowski	116 (−66)
	10	Matt Kenseth	113 (−69)
2	11	Paul Menard	112 (−70)
3	12	Casey Mears	111 (−71)
5	13	Denny Hamlin	108 (−74)
1	14	Aric Almirola	105 (−77)
1	15	Clint Bowyer	101 (−81)
5	16	Greg Biffle	101 (−81)

Manufacturers' Championship standings

Pos	Manufacturer	Points
1	Chevrolet	185
2	Ford	165 (−20)
3	Toyota	151 (−34)

- Note: Only the first sixteen positions are included for the driver standings.

== Notes ==
Previous race: 2015 Kobalt 400	Sprint Cup Series; 2015 season	Next race: 2015 Auto Club 400
