= Reed Sorenson =

American racing driver (born 1986)

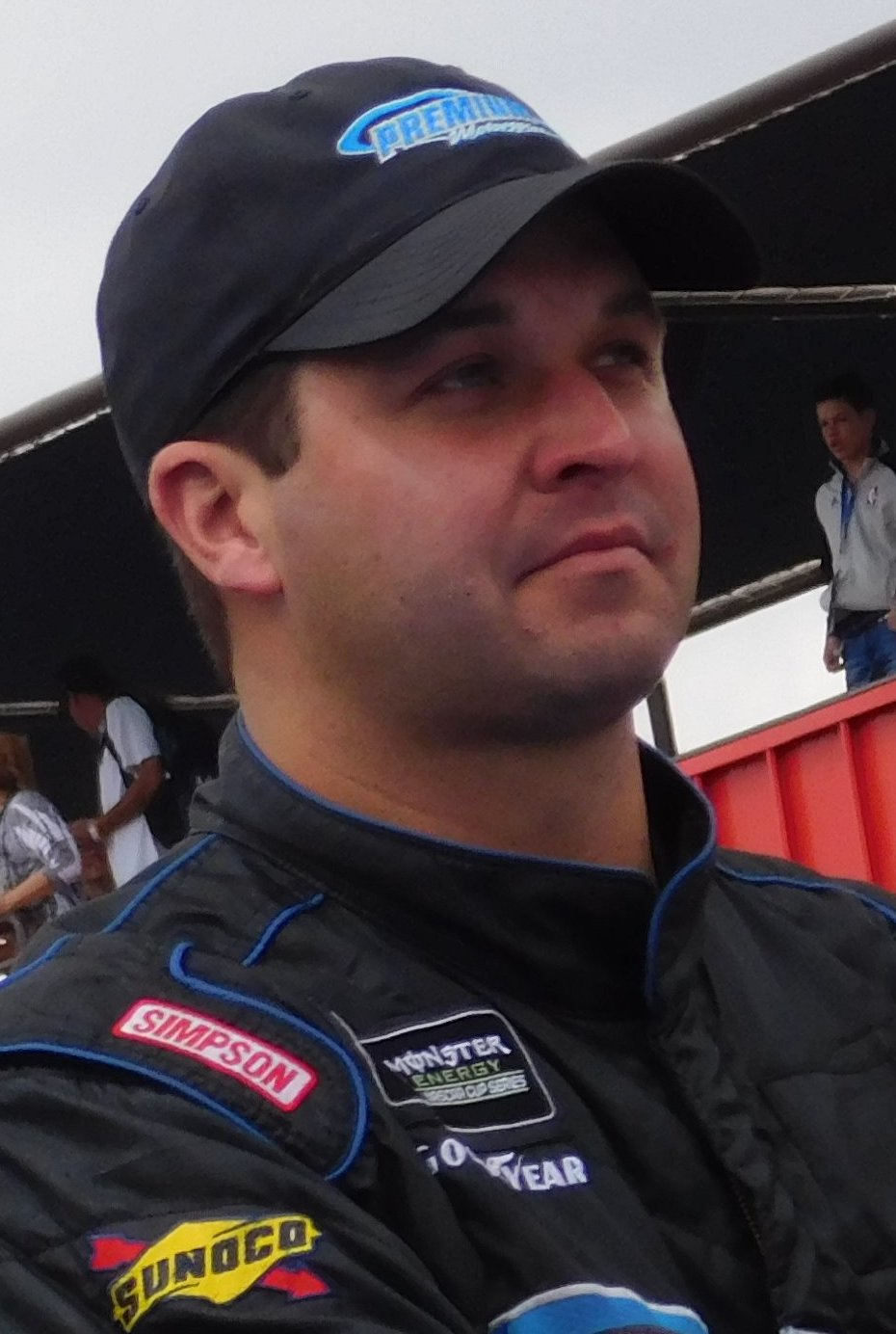
- Sorenson at Auto Club Speedway in 2017
- Born: Bradley Reed Sorenson; February 5, 1986 (age 40); Peachtree City, Georgia, U.S.
- Awards: 2003 ASA National Tour Rookie of the Year

NASCAR Cup Series career
- 346 races run over 16 years
- 2020 position: 36th
- Best finish: 22nd (2007)
- First race: 2005 Bass Pro Shops MBNA 500 (Atlanta)
- Last race: 2020 Autotrader EchoPark Automotive 500 (Texas)
Wins	Top tens	Poles
0	15	1

NASCAR O'Reilly Auto Parts Series career
- 207 races run over 11 years
- 2017 position: 112th
- Best finish: 4th (2005)
- First race: 2004 Kroger 200 (IRP)
- Last race: 2017 O'Reilly Auto Parts 300 (Texas)
- First win: 2005 Pepsi 300 (Nashville)
- Last win: 2011 Bucyrus 200 (Road America)
Wins	Top tens	Poles
4	86	2

NASCAR FedEx Freight Truck Series career
- 11 races run over 2 years
- 2018 position: 72nd
- Best finish: 72nd (2018)
- First race: 2016 Pocono Mountains 150 (Pocono)
- Last race: 2018 JAG Metals 350 (Texas)
Wins	Top tens	Poles
0	0	0
- Statistics up to date as of November 9, 2020.

Bradley Reed Sorenson (born February 5, 1986) is an American former professional stock car racing driver and spotter. He last competed part-time in the NASCAR Cup Series, driving the No. 27 Chevrolet Camaro ZL1 1LE for Premium Motorsports, the Nos. 74/77 Camaro for Spire Motorsports, and the No. 7 Camaro for Tommy Baldwin Racing. As of 2026, he works as a spotter for Kaulig Racing's No. 11 of Josh Williams in the NASCAR Xfinity Series. Sorenson began competing in NASCAR in 2004 as a Busch Series driver; he has four wins in the series. His first Cup start came in 2005 before moving to a full schedule the following year.

== Early career ==
Sorenson's career started at age six when he began racing quarter-midgets. He won the national championship in 1997. He moved up to legends cars the following year, winning thirteen out of 25 races, southeastern championships and breaking track records in the process. In 1999, he won thirty out of the fifty races in which he competed. He raced in legends for the next two years and won 84 events.

In 2002, Sorenson began racing in the American Speed Association (ASA), finishing in the top-ten seven out of his eight starts. He became a full-time driver in 2003 and won the highly coveted ASA Pat Schauer Memorial Rookies of the Year award at the age seventeen. He caught his big break by signing a driver development contract with Chip Ganassi Racing.

== NASCAR ==
In 2004, Sorenson won his first ARCA race, at Michigan International Speedway, in the No. 77 Sherwin-Williams Dodge. He finished in the top-five in all three of his ARCA starts. Sorenson also ran in five NASCAR Busch Series events for Chip Ganassi Racing, and had three top-ten finishes, and a top-five, which was a fourth place finish at Homestead.

=== 2005 ===
Sorenson was named the full-time driver of the No. 41 Discount Tire Company Dodge Intrepid for Ganassi for 2005, competing for rookie of the year. He won his first Busch Series race, at Nashville Superspeedway, winning by more than 14 seconds after starting on the pole and leading 197 out of 225 laps. After the Federated Auto Parts 300, he was leading the points race by 51. Sorenson picked up another win at Gateway. He ended the season fourth in points and finished second in the rookie of the year race to Carl Edwards.

Towards the end of the season, Sorenson was signed to move up to the Nextel Cup Series to drive the No. 41 Target car full-time. He made his Nextel Cup debut in the 2005 Bass Pro Shops MBNA 500, racing as No. 39, but was involved in a crash and finished 41st. After a failed attempt to qualify for the Dickies 500, he ran in the Ford 400 for Phoenix Racing, where he finished in 28th.

=== 2006–2008 ===
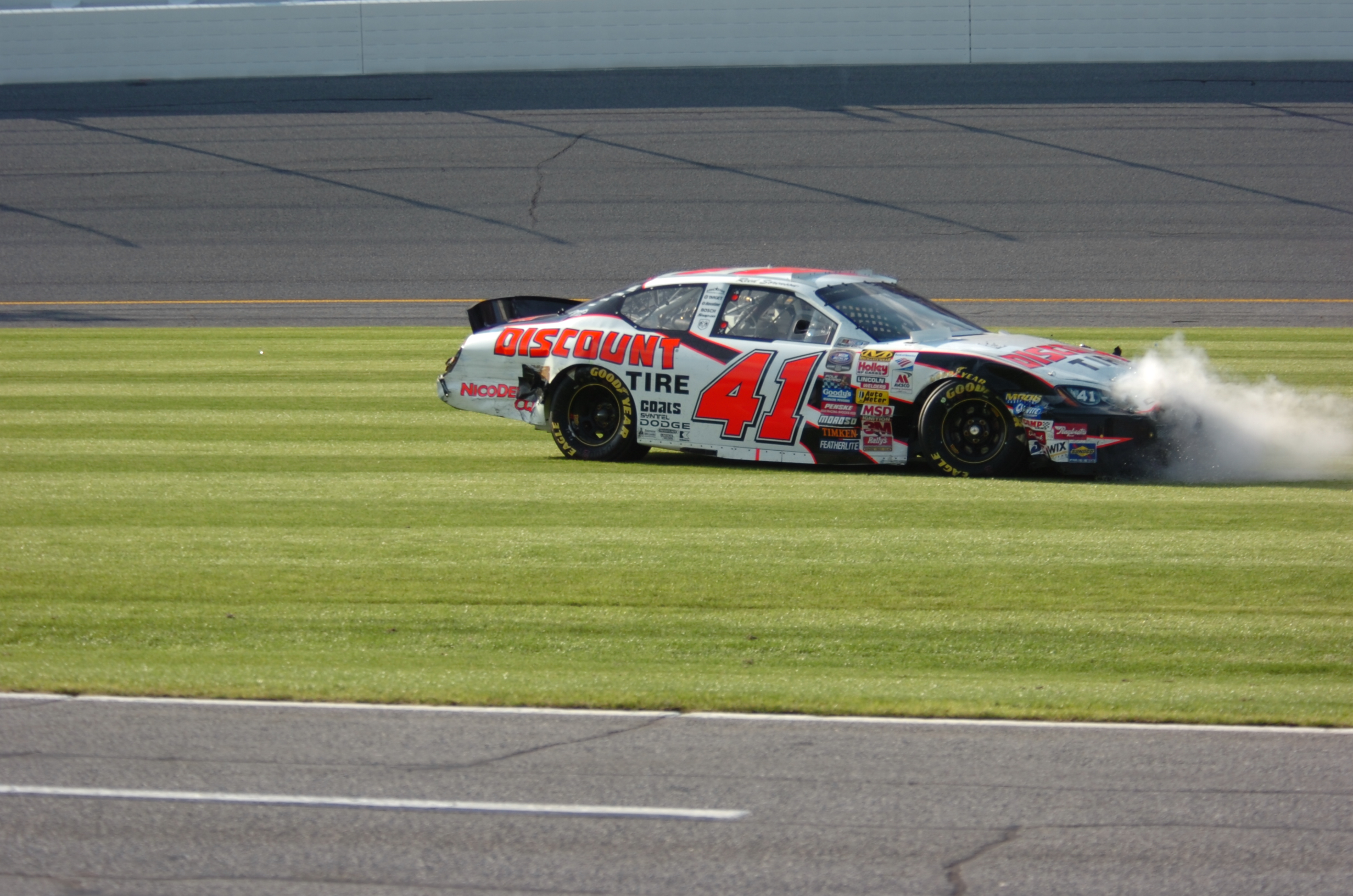
Sorenson in his 2006 Busch Series car after his car hit the wall

2006 brought on Sorenson's first season as a Nextel Cup Series regular, along with running a full-time driver in the Busch Series. His best finish in the 2006 Nextel Cup season was a fifth place effort at Michigan International Speedway, and he ended the season with five top-ten finishes. He finished 24th in the 2006 points Nextel Cup standings and was fourth in the 2006 Raybestos Rookie of the Year contest with 198 points finishing behind Denny Hamlin, Martin Truex Jr., and Clint Bowyer. He also fell in the Busch Series, dropping from fourth in the standings as a nineteen-year-old the year before to tenth place in 2006.

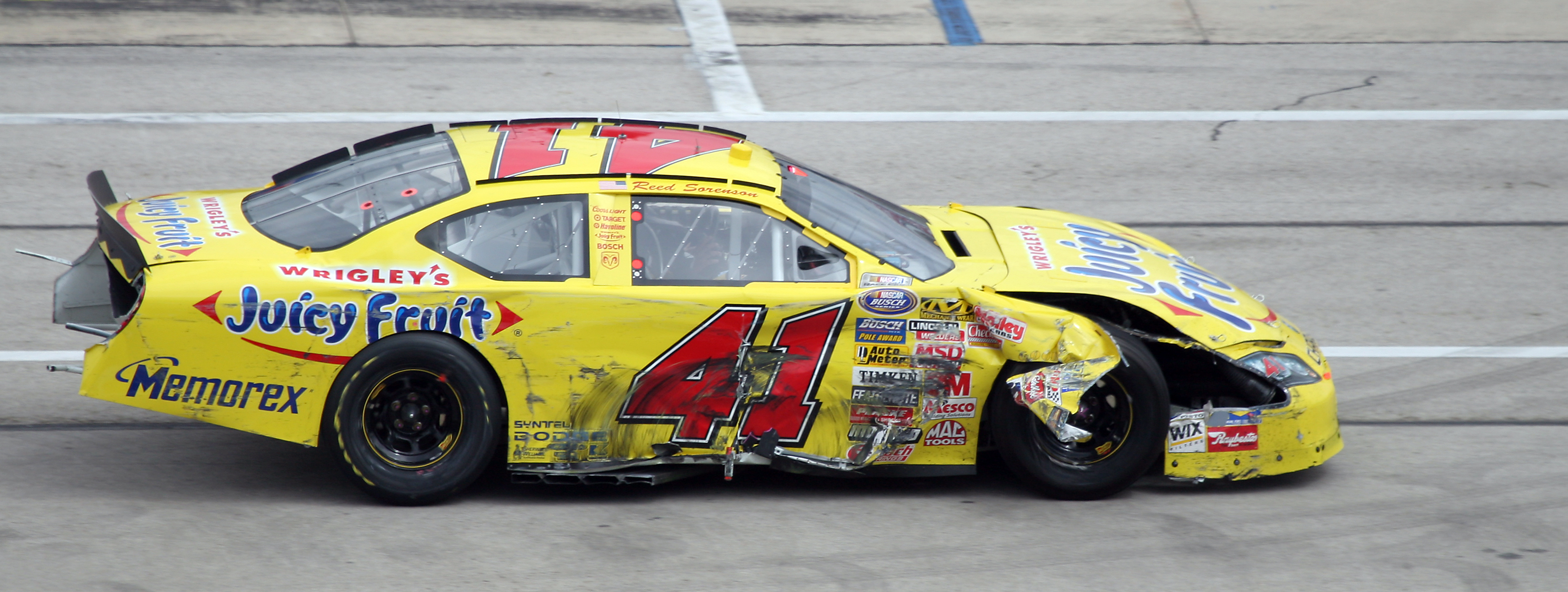
Sorenson in his 2007 Busch Series car after an accident

Sorenson broke his 61-race winless streak in the Busch Series at Gateway International Speedway by leading 95 laps and avoiding late race cautions to win the Busch Gateway 250 in Madison, Illinois. In Cup, he had a career best finish of fourth, at the Coca-Cola 600, and later a third place finish at his home track at Atlanta. Sorenson got his first career pole, at the Allstate 400. Sorenson became the youngest pole winner ever at Indianapolis Motor Speedway; at 21 years, 173 days old. He broke a record that stood for 72 years. It was previously held by Rex Mays, who won the pole for the Indianapolis 500 in 1935 at 22 years of age. Sorenson ended up leading sixteen laps, and finishing in the fifth place, behind race winner, Tony Stewart. At the end of the 2007 season, he placed 22nd in the final standings, improving two spots from 2006 (although he actually scored fewer points than in his rookie season).

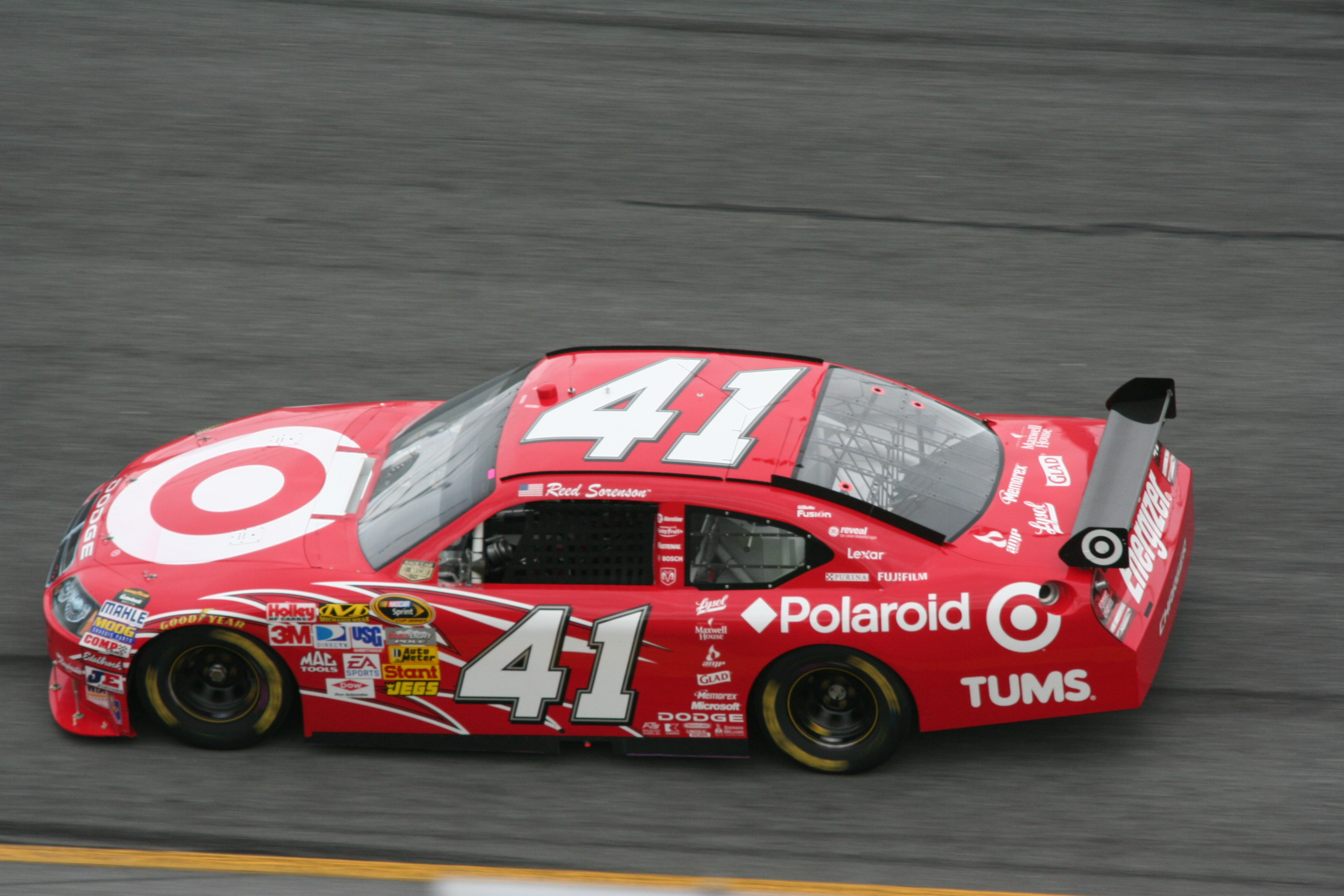
2008 Cup racecar

Sorenson started the 2008 season off with a fifth place finish in the Daytona 500. This was the peak of his performances for the season. He got another top-ten finish with some late race strategy in a rain shortened New Hampshire race. He was temporarily replaced by Scott Pruett at Infineon Raceway in an attempt to gain points in the owners' standings. Sorenson ran a limited 2008 NASCAR Nationwide Series competing in the Aaron's 312 at Talladega Superspeedway in the Fitz Motorsports No. 22 Arctic Ice car.

Sorenson competed in the Missouri-Illinois Dodge Dealers 250 at Gateway International Raceway to defend his win from 2007, in the No. 40 Fastenal Chip Ganassi Racing Dodge. He was involved in a mid-race wreck that ended his chance to defend his title. On August 26, 2008, it was announced that the 2008 season was to be Sorenson's last season with Ganassi, after signing a multi-year contract with Gillett Evernham Motorsports to start the 2009 season. He ended the year 32nd in points.

=== 2009 ===
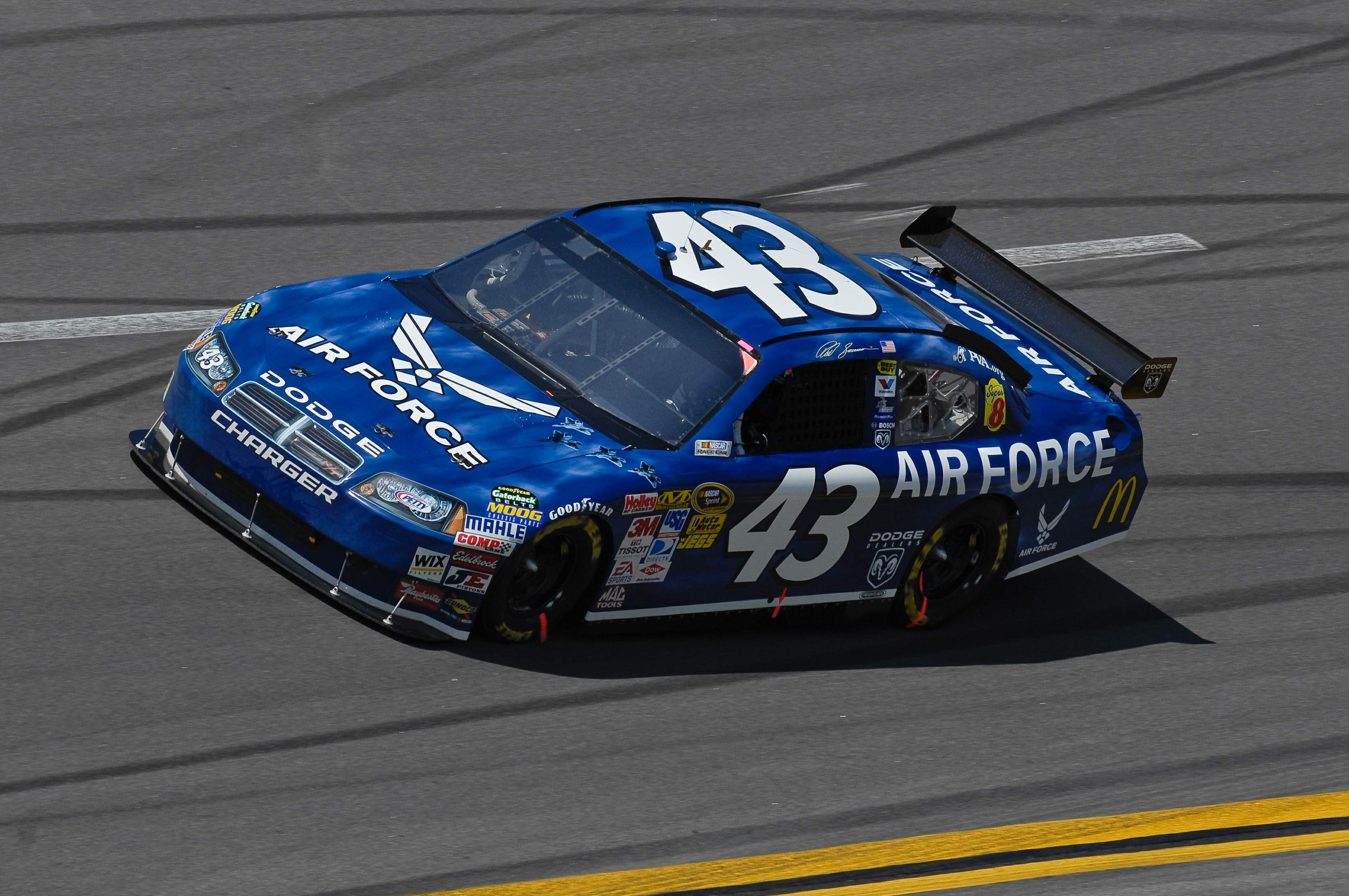
Sorenson's No. 43 during the 2009 Aaron's 499

On January 8, 2009, Gillett Evernham Motorsports and Petty Holdings announced in principle to form a new NASCAR Sprint Cup team that will be co-owned by Richard Petty, Petty Holdings (owned by majority shareholder Boston Ventures), and Gillett Evernham Motorsports. The new car number would be No. 43 and would be driven by Sorenson. It was announced on January 19, 2009, that with the merger of Gillett Evernham Motorsports and Petty Holdings the newly formed team will be known as Richard Petty Motorsports.

Sorenson's 2009 season was wildly disappointing; he had only one top-ten (at the season-opening Daytona 500) and finished 29th in the season standings. On September 10, 2009, Richard Petty Motorsports and Yates Racing announced that they planned to merge in 2010, and Sorenson was not to be retained as part of the merger. A. J. Allmendinger took over the No. 43 following the season.

=== 2010 ===
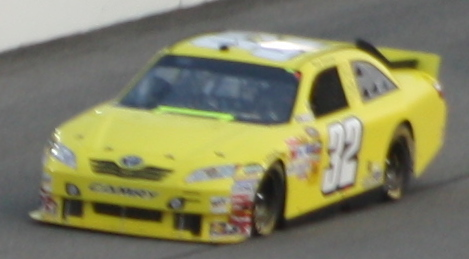
Sorenson's No. 32 car at Richmond International Raceway in 2010

Sorenson piloted the No. 32 Braun Racing Toyota Camry in a part-time schedule consisting of 23 Nationwide races for 2010. He was to share the ride with Brian Vickers, but after Vickers was diagnosed with blood clots in May and cannot race, Sorenson is to take over for the rest of Vickers' planned Nationwide starts. In mid-January, Braun Racing announced that Sorenson would drive a part-time Sprint Cup Series schedule. After failing to qualify for the Daytona 500, the team announced they will attempt the Kobalt Tools 500 in Atlanta, but decided to rather attempt the Samsung Mobile 500 in Texas, where Sorenson qualified 43rd and finished 39th. On June 16, Sorenson was hired by Team Red Bull as a substitute driver for car No. 83 and driver Brian Vickers. At the Coke Zero 400 at Daytona, Sorenson drove the No. 83 car to an eighth place finish. It was the first top-ten for the team since Vickers was sidelined.

=== 2011 ===
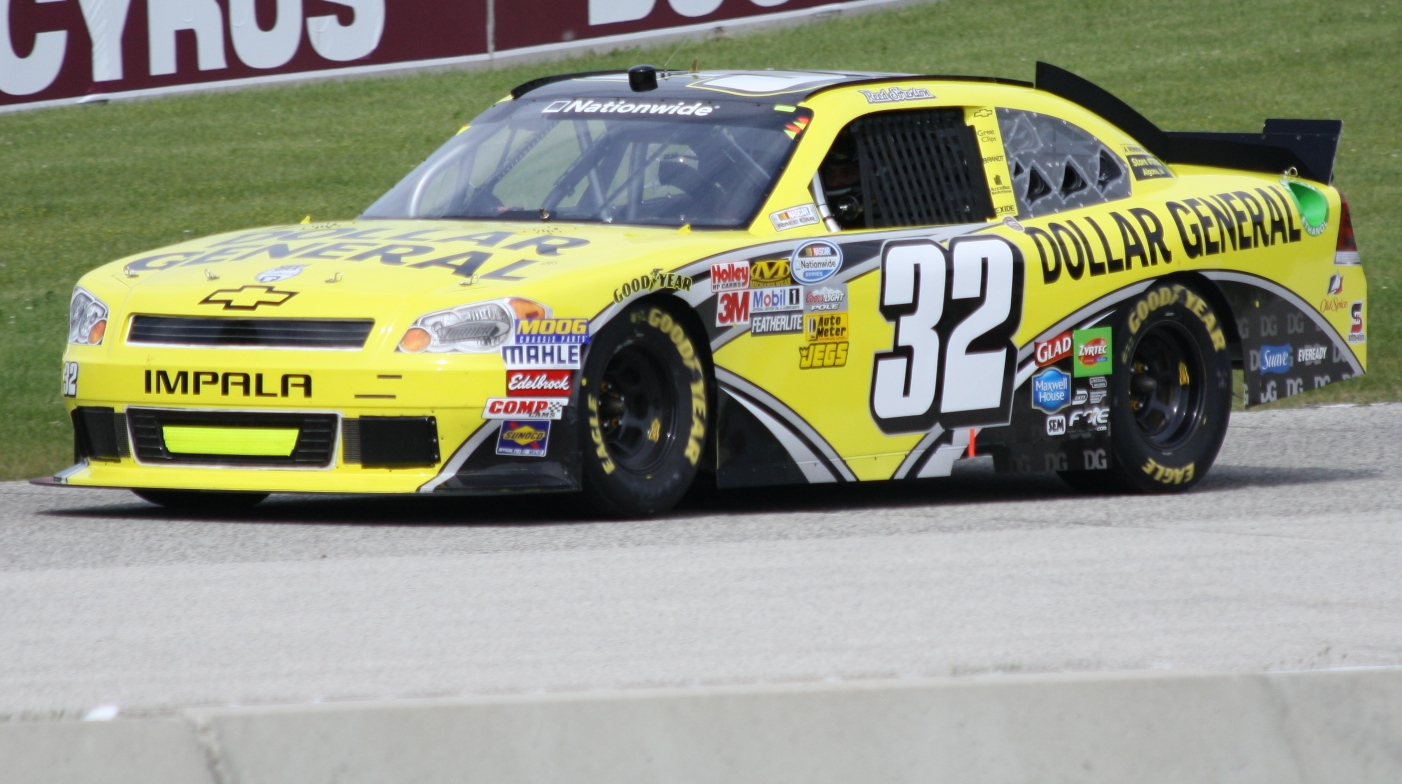
Sorenson's car at his last (as of 2019) Xfinity Series win at Road America

Prior to the 2011 season, Braun Racing was acquired by Turner Motorsports and the team switched manufacturers from Toyota to Chevrolet. Sorenson remained with the team to run full-time for the Nationwide Series championship. He drove the No. 32 Dollar General Chevy and the No. 30 Rexall Chevy on occasions. He won his first road course race at Road America in Elkhart Lake, Wisconsin on his first attempt at the track. This was his first win since 2007.

On October 4, Turner Motorsports announced that Sorenson would no longer be driving the No. 32 Dollar General Chevy, and Brian Vickers would be assuming the driving duties immediately. Turner Motorsports gave no reason for the switch; and Sorenson was third in points at the time. Turner did acknowledge that Dollar General would not sponsor their car after 2011. Sorenson managed to pick up a last-minute ride with MacDonald Motorsports to drive their No. 82 car for the remainder of the year.

=== 2012 ===
In 2012, Sorenson drove the No. 52 Chevrolet for Jimmy Means in the season-opening Nationwide Series event at Daytona International Speedway. At Bristol Motor Speedway and California Speedway in March, Sorenson drove the No. 74 for Turn One Racing in the Sprint Cup Series.

Sorenson made his debut in the No. 32 team owned by Frank Stoddard for the night race at Texas Motor Speedway with sponsor from Jani-king.

Sorenson drove the No. 32 for FAS Lane Racing in select races for the 2012 Sprint Cup Season. Later in the year, he attempted to qualify for the Brickyard 400 driving the No. 91 Ford for Humphrey Smith Racing, but failed to qualify for the race. He qualified for the Pennsylvania 400 the following week, making his first race in the No. 91, which had changed to Toyota.

=== 2013 ===
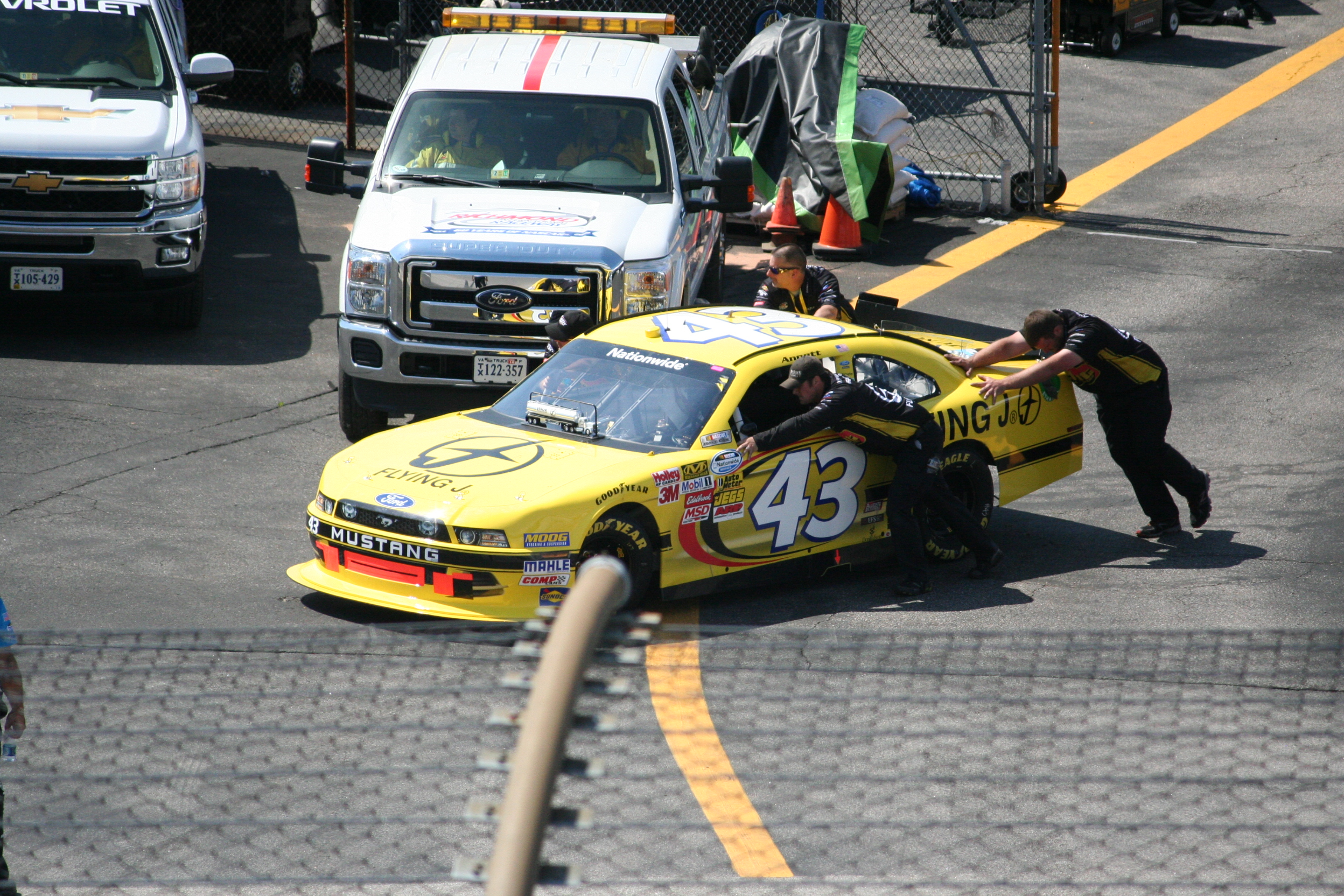
Sorenson's No. 43 in 2013

In February 2013, it was announced that Sorenson would drive full-time in the Nationwide Series in the No. 40 Chevrolet for The Motorsports Group. Following an injury to Michael Annett, Sorenson substituted for Annett in the Richard Petty Motorsports No. 43 Ford for several races.

In September, Sorenson returned to the Sprint Cup Series, replacing Scott Speed in the No. 95 Ford for Leavine Family Racing. However, he failed to secure the seat for 2014, with Leavine instead picking Michael McDowell to drive the car.

=== 2014 ===
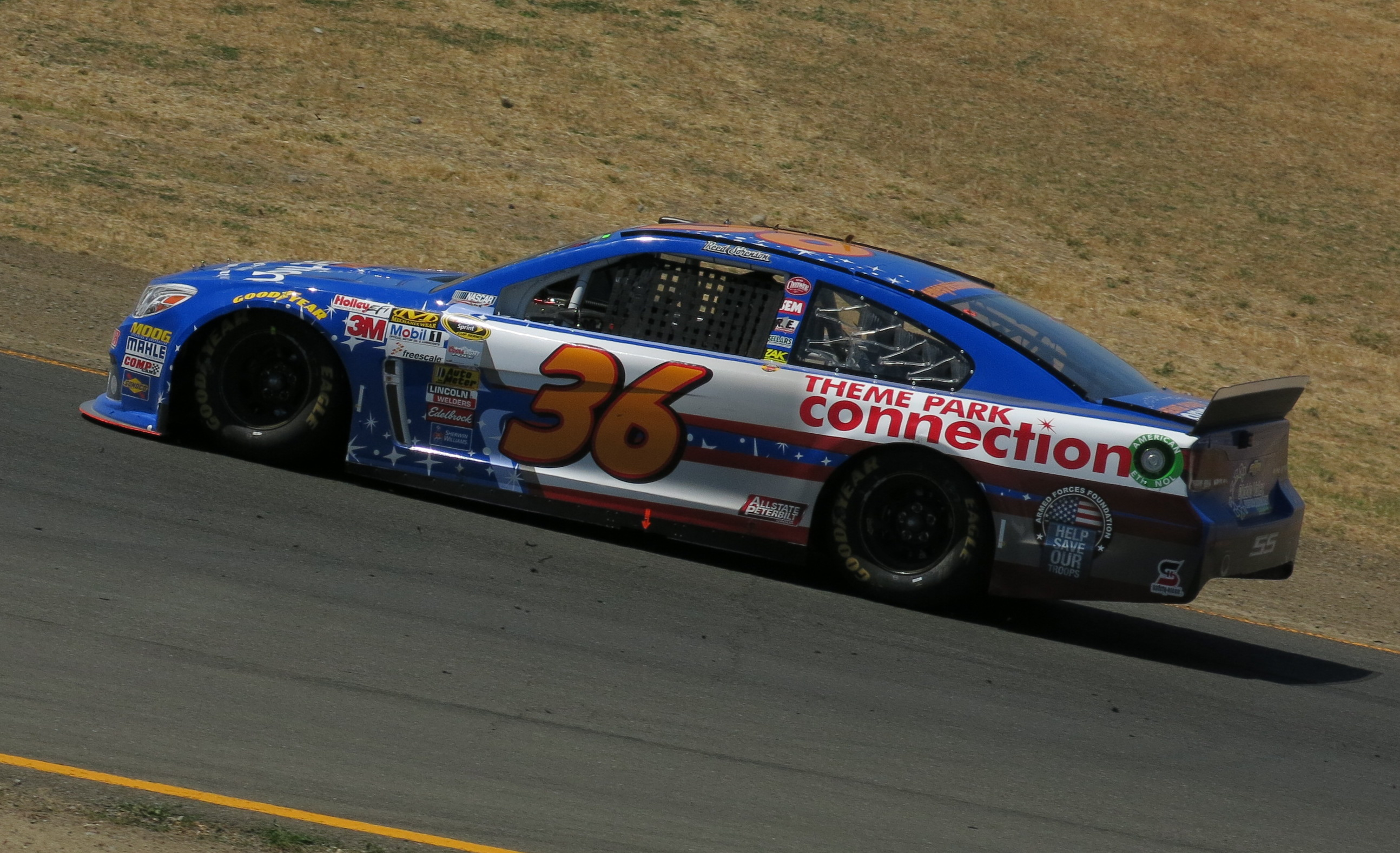
Sorenson's No. 36 at Sonoma Raceway in 2014

In February 2014, Sorenson announced that he would be running his first full Sprint Cup Series schedule since 2009, driving the No. 36 Chevrolet for Tommy Baldwin Racing, replacing J. J. Yeley. Veteran crew chief Todd Parrott was brought in to work with Sorenson. After struggling with limited sponsorship in the beginning of the year, the team came around during the second half of the season with additional sponsorship, recording five top-25s and ten top-thirties in the final sixteen events of the season, with a high of fourteenth at Talladega. The team finished with an average finish of 29th.

=== 2015 ===
On February 9, 2015, Sorenson was signed by Team Xtreme Racing to compete in the Daytona 500 with sponsorship from Golden Corral, driving the No. 44 Chevy. Sorenson joined RAB Racing for the following race at Atlanta. He was also signed with Premium Motorsports after lack of sponsorship killed both of his prior teams.

=== 2016 ===
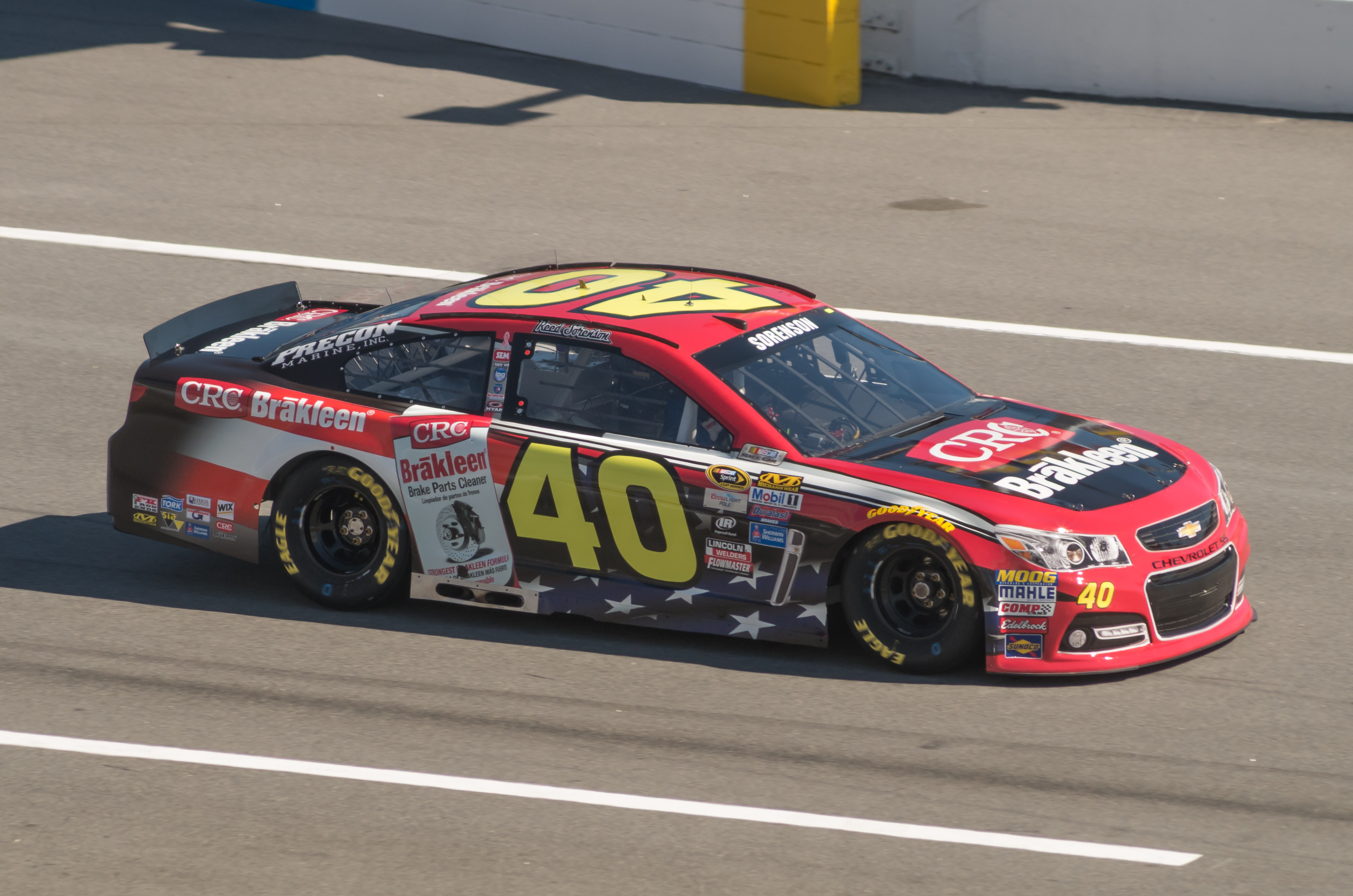
Sorenson's 2016 Cup car for Hillman Racing

Sorenson attempted to make his Camping World Truck Series debut at Daytona, driving the No. 63 for MB Motorsports. Sorenson also joined Hillman Racing for the Daytona 500, driving the No. 40 Chevrolet but didn't qualify. Sorenson missed both events. Sorenson returned to Premium Motorsports, driving the No. 55 Chevrolet starting at Martinsville. Sorenson later made his Camping World Truck Series debut at Pocono, driving the No. 49 Chevrolet Silverado for Premium Motorsports where he finished eighteenth.

=== 2017 ===
Sorenson returned to Premium for the 2017 season. He failed to qualify after being (possibly) intentionally wrecked by Corey LaJoie in Can-Am Duel 1. After the race, Sorenson called the move "pretty crappy" and "moronic" and added on that LaJoie, making his first Daytona laps during the Duel, could've hurt someone, drawing comparisons to Kyle Busch's 2015 Daytona wreck, after which he missed eleven races.

After flagship driver Michael Waltrip announced that he would retire from NASCAR competition after the 2017 Daytona 500, Premium Motorsports announced that Sorenson would drive the No. 15 Toyota for the rest of the 2017 season, following Robinson's purchase of HScott Motorsports' No. 15 Chevrolet. However, Premium removed Sorenson from the 15 for Dover, replacing him with Ross Chastain. Although he did run Pocono and Michigan, he was replaced again by Kevin O'Connell at Sonoma, and D. J. Kennington at Daytona he then returned to the No. 15 until he was again replaced, this time by Gray Gaulding at Pocono. He bounced around the No. 15 and No. 55 entry's for the rest of the year.

=== 2018–present ===
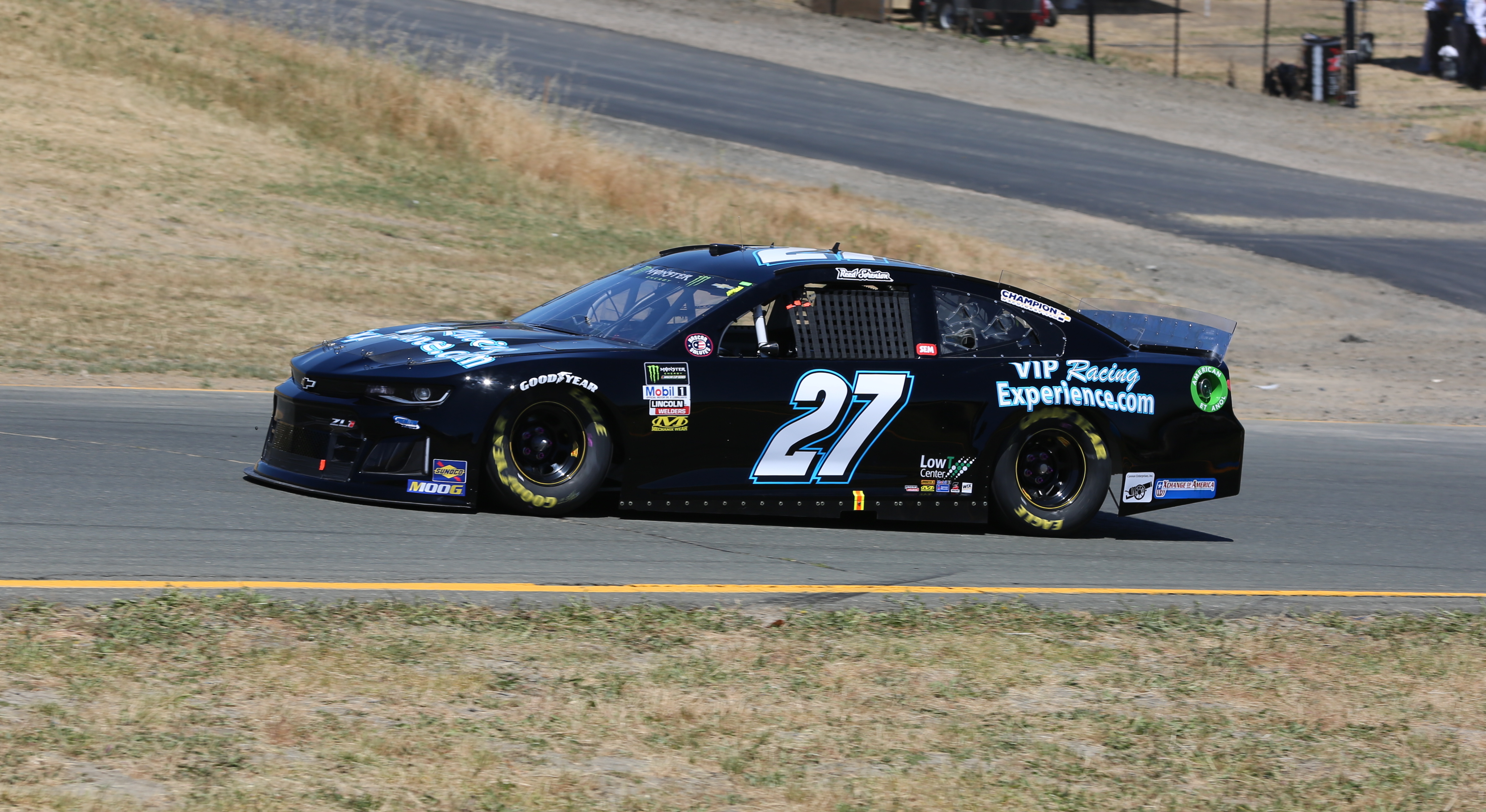
Sorenson's No. 27 at the 2019 Sonoma Raceway

Sorenson drove mainly the No. 7 and No. 55 entries for Premium Motorsports throughout the year, with also driving the Bristol night race in Rick Ware Racing’s No. 51 entry. He qualified for Ross Chastain at the Michigan August race in the No. 15 when Chastain was in Mid-Ohio for the Xfinity race.

In March 2019, Sorenson joined Spire Motorsports' No. 77 for the Pennzoil 400 at Las Vegas. Throughout the 2019 season, he split the ride with various other drivers and also raced for Premium in the No. 27.

Sorenson returned to Premium's No. 27 for the 2020 Daytona 500. He made the starting lineup after finishing eighteenth in Duel 1 of the 2020 Bluegreen Vacations Duels.

In 2021, Sorenson became the spotter for Xfinity driver Josh Williams.

== Motorsports career results ==
=== NASCAR ===
(key) (Bold – Pole position awarded by qualifying time. Italics – Pole position earned by points standings or practice time. * – Most laps led.)

==== Cup Series ====
NASCAR Cup Series results
Year	Team	No.	Make	1	2	3	4	5	6	7	8	9	10	11	12	13	14	15	16	17	18	19	20	21	22	23	24	25	26	27	28	29	30	31	32	33	34	35	36	NCSC	Pts	Ref
2005	Chip Ganassi Racing	39	Dodge	DAY	CAL	LVS	ATL	BRI	MAR	TEX	PHO	TAL	DAR	RCH	CLT	DOV	POC	MCH	SON	DAY	CHI	NHA	POC	IND	GLN	MCH	BRI	CAL	RCH	NHA	DOV	TAL	KAN	CLT	MAR	ATL; 41	TEX; DNQ	PHO		67th	119	
2005	Phoenix Racing	09	Dodge																																				HOM; 28	67th	119	
2006	Chip Ganassi Racing	41	Dodge	DAY; 29	CAL; 21	LVS; 40	ATL; 10	BRI; 22	MAR; 12	TEX; 13	PHO; 40	TAL; 26	RCH; 23	DAR; 11	CLT; 10	DOV; 19	POC; 36	MCH; 5	SON; 29	DAY; 34	CHI; 7	NHA; 24	POC; 26	IND; 30	GLN; 12	MCH; 8	BRI; 36	CAL; 21	RCH; 14	NHA; 17	DOV; 11	KAN; 43	TAL; 39	CLT; 36	MAR; 35	ATL; 29	TEX; 17	PHO; 29	HOM; 16	24th	3434	
2007	Chip Ganassi Racing	41	Dodge	DAY; 13	CAL; 43	LVS; 31	ATL; 9	BRI; 43	MAR; 18	TEX; 40	PHO; 15	TAL; 25	RCH; 21	DAR; 40	CLT; 4	DOV; 27	POC; 24	MCH; 23	SON; 40	NHA; 26	DAY; 42	CHI; 12	**IND**; 5	POC; 28	GLN; 28	MCH; 38	BRI; 15	CAL; 21	RCH; 32	NHA; 14	DOV; 30	KAN; 7	TAL; 10	CLT; 30	MAR; 41	ATL; 3	TEX; 40	PHO; 19	HOM; 22	22nd	3275	
2008	Chip Ganassi Racing	41	Dodge	DAY; 5	CAL; 37	LVS; 18	ATL; 31	BRI; 31	MAR; 36	TEX; 24	PHO; 42	TAL; 43	RCH; 12	DAR; 32	CLT; 22	DOV; 26	POC; 33	MCH; 34	SON	NHA; 6	DAY; 22	CHI; 31	IND; 17	POC; 35	GLN; 31	MCH; 33	BRI; 36	CAL; 27	RCH; 26	NHA; 22	DOV; 30	KAN; 26	TAL; 23	CLT; 15	MAR; 35	ATL; 39	TEX; 37	PHO; 31	HOM; 31	32nd	2795	
2009	Richard Petty Motorsports	43	Dodge	DAY; 9	CAL; 21	LVS; 34	ATL; 33	BRI; 23	MAR; 17	TEX; 36	PHO; 12	TAL; 11	RCH; 20	DAR; 19	CLT; 35	DOV; 19	POC; 20	MCH; 27	SON; 40	NHA; 17	DAY; 33	CHI; 24	IND; 13	POC; 35	GLN; 31	MCH; 29	BRI; 19	ATL; 27	RCH; 16	NHA; 36	DOV; 35	KAN; 26	CAL; 31	CLT; 21	MAR; 24	TAL; 16	TEX; 36	PHO; 26	HOM; 40	29th	3147	
2010	Braun Racing	32	Toyota	DAY; DNQ	CAL	LVS	ATL	BRI	MAR	PHO	TEX; 39	TAL	RCH; 41	DAR; 43	DOV	CLT; DNQ	POC	MCH	SON																					39th	1355	
2010	Team Red Bull	83	Toyota																	NHA; 24	DAY; 8	CHI; 27	IND; 35	POC; 32	GLN	MCH; 26	BRI; 15	ATL; 14	RCH	NHA; 27	DOV; 16	KAN; 30	CAL; 27	CLT; 18	MAR	TAL	TEX	PHO	HOM	39th	1355	
2011	Robby Gordon Motorsports	7	Dodge	DAY	PHO	LVS	BRI	CAL	MAR	TEX	TAL	RCH	DAR	DOV	CLT	KAN	POC	MCH	SON	DAY	KEN	NHA	IND	POC	GLN	MCH	BRI	ATL	RCH	CHI	NHA	DOV; 38	KAN; 38	CLT	TAL	MAR; 36	TEX; DNQ	PHO	HOM; DNQ	72nd	0^{1}	
2012	Turn One Racing	74	Chevy	DAY	PHO	LVS	BRI; 42	CAL; 42	MAR; 43																															69th	0^{1}	
2012	FAS Lane Racing	32	Ford							TEX; 32	KAN; 28	RCH; 34	TAL	DAR; 30	CLT	DOV; 30	POC; 41	MCH	SON	KEN	DAY	NHA																		69th	0^{1}	
2012	Humphrey Smith Racing	91	Ford																				IND; DNQ																	69th	0^{1}	
2012	Humphrey Smith Racing	91	Toyota																					POC; 42	GLN	MCH; 42		ATL; 42				DOV; 43	TAL	CLT; 41	KAN; 41		TEX; 43	PHO		69th	0^{1}	
2012	Humphrey Smith Racing	91	Chevy																								BRI; DNQ		RCH; 43	CHI; DNQ	NHA; 42					MAR; 43				69th	0^{1}	
2012	Go Green Racing	79	Ford																																				HOM; DNQ	69th	0^{1}	
2013	Leavine Family Racing	95	Ford	DAY	PHO	LVS	BRI	CAL	MAR	TEX	KAN	RCH	TAL	DAR	CLT	DOV	POC	MCH	SON	KEN	DAY	NHA	IND	POC	GLN	MCH	BRI	ATL	RCH; 42	CHI; 42	NHA	DOV; 41	KAN; 42	CLT	TAL	MAR; 40	TEX	PHO; 37	HOM	71st	0^{1}	
2014	Tommy Baldwin Racing	36	Chevy	DAY; 16	PHO; 31	LVS; 34	BRI; 28	CAL; 21	MAR; 34	TEX; 33	DAR; 39	RCH; 42	TAL; 34	KAN; 32	CLT; 42	DOV; 24	POC; 34	MCH; 32	SON; 32	KEN; 27	DAY; 33	NHA; 33	IND; 38	POC; 27	GLN; 23	MCH; 27	BRI; 24	ATL; 29	RCH; 24	CHI; 29	NHA; 31	DOV; 32	KAN; 26	CLT; 27	TAL; 14	MAR; 35	TEX; 33	PHO; 28	HOM; 24	34th	516	
2015	Team Xtreme Racing	44	Chevy	DAY; 32																																				41st	74	
2015	RAB Racing	29	Toyota		ATL; DNQ	LVS; DNQ	PHO; Wth	CAL; DNQ	MAR	TEX	BRI																													41st	74	
2015	Front Row Motorsports	34	Ford									RCH; 34	TAL	KAN	CLT	DOV	POC	MCH	SON	DAY																				41st	74	
2015	Premium Motorsports	62	Chevy																		KEN; 36	NHA; DNQ	IND; DNQ				BRI; DNQ	DAR												41st	74	
2015	Premium Motorsports	98	Chevy																					POC; 34	GLN															41st	74	
2015	Premium Motorsports	62	Ford																							MCH; DNQ														41st	74	
2015	Premium Motorsports	98	Ford																										RCH; 41	CHI; 40	NHA	DOV; 33	CLT; 35	KAN; 38	TAL	MAR				41st	74	
2015	Premium Motorsports	62	Toyota																																		TEX; DNQ	PHO	HOM; DNQ	41st	74	
2016	Hillman Racing	40	Chevy	DAY; DNQ	ATL	LVS	PHO	CAL																																39th	198	
2016	Premium Motorsports	55	Chevy						MAR; 37	TEX; 36	BRI; 40	RCH; 40	TAL	KAN; 33	DOV; 38	CLT; 40					KEN; 27	NHA; 35	IND; 33	POC; 40	GLN	BRI; 27	MCH; 36	DAR; 31	RCH; 26	CHI; 39			CLT; 28			MAR; 38				39th	198	
2016	Premium Motorsports	98	Chevy														POC; 28	MCH; 31	SON																			PHO; 36		39th	198	
2016	Premium Motorsports	55	Toyota																	DAY; 22											NHA; 36	DOV; 35			TAL; 37		TEX; 35		HOM; 32	39th	198	
2016	Premium Motorsports	98	Toyota																															KAN; 34						39th	198	
2017	Premium Motorsports	55	Toyota	DAY; DNQ									TAL; 40							DAY; 30												DOV; 39								35th	150	
2017	Premium Motorsports	15	Chevy		ATL; 31		PHO; 30		MAR; 31	TEX; 35	BRI; 28	RCH; 33		KAN; 25	CLT; 30	DOV		MCH; 34	SON		KEN; 28	NHA; 34	IND	POC	GLN		BRI; 38			CHI; 32	NHA; 28		CLT; 31	TAL	KAN; 25	MAR; 32	TEX; 31	PHO	HOM; 35	35th	150	
2017	Premium Motorsports	15	Toyota			LVS; 31		CAL; 34									POC; 31											DAR; 39												35th	150	
2017	Premium Motorsports	55	Chevy																							MCH; 33			RCH; 30											35th	150	
2018	Premium Motorsports	55	Chevy	DAY	ATL	LVS	PHO	CAL; 34	MAR	TEX; 31	BRI; 32	RCH; 38	TAL; 37	DOV; 32	KAN; 27	CLT	POC	MCH	SON																					64th	0^{1}	
2018	Premium Motorsports	7	Chevy																	CHI; 32	DAY	KEN	NHA	POC; 32	GLN				IND; 28	LVS; 31	RCH	ROV	DOV	TAL	KAN; 36	MAR	TEX; 33	PHO	HOM	64th	0^{1}	
2018	Premium Motorsports	15	Chevy																							MCH; QL^{†}														64th	0^{1}	
2018	Rick Ware Racing	51	Chevy																								BRI; 33	DAR												64th	0^{1}	
2019	Spire Motorsports	77	Chevy	DAY	ATL	LVS; 36	PHO																		GLN; 37	MCH; QL^{‡}	BRI; 38	DAR; 30	IND; 23	LVS; 37	RCH; 37	ROV; 39	DOV; 37					PHO; 37	HOM; 37	32nd	118	
2019	Premium Motorsports	27	Chevy					CAL; 34	MAR	TEX; 34	BRI	RCH	TAL; 18	DOV; 35	KAN; 35	CLT; 30	POC; 28	MCH	SON; 35	CHI; 34	DAY	KEN	NHA; 27	POC; 32										TAL; 22	KAN; 33	MAR; 33	TEX			32nd	118	
2020	Premium Motorsports	27	Chevy	DAY; 31																																				36th	68	
2020	Spire Motorsports	77	Chevy		LVS; 34	CAL; 36	PHO; 30	DAR; 29	DAR	CLT	CLT	BRI															DOV; 39	DOV; 33	DAY	DAR	RCH; 36	BRI; 36	LVS	TAL	ROV	KAN; 36	TEX; 32	MAR	PHO	36th	68	
2020	Tommy Baldwin Racing	7	Chevy										ATL; 27	MAR; 38	HOM	TAL	POC	POC	IND	KEN	TEX; 28	KAN; 31	NHA																	36th	68	
2020	Spire Motorsports	74	Chevy																					MCH; 30	MCH; 31	DRC														36th	68	
^{†} – Qualified for Ross Chastain · ^{‡} – Qualified for Garrett Smithley

===== Daytona 500 =====
Year	Team	Manufacturer	Start	Finish
2006	Chip Ganassi Racing	Dodge	22	29
2007	Chip Ganassi Racing	Dodge	33	13
2008	Chip Ganassi Racing	Dodge	5	5
2009	Richard Petty Motorsports	Dodge	34	9
2010	Braun Racing	Toyota	DNQ	
2014	Tommy Baldwin Racing	Chevrolet	39	16
2015	Team Xtreme Racing	Chevrolet	14	32
2016	Hillman Racing	Chevrolet	DNQ	
2017	Premium Motorsports	Toyota	DNQ	
2020	Premium Motorsports	Chevrolet	40	31

==== Xfinity Series ====
NASCAR Xfinity Series results
Year	Team	No.	Make	1	2	3	4	5	6	7	8	9	10	11	12	13	14	15	16	17	18	19	20	21	22	23	24	25	26	27	28	29	30	31	32	33	34	35	NXSC	Pts	Ref
2004	Chip Ganassi Racing	41	Dodge	DAY	CAR	LVS	DAR	BRI	TEX	NSH	TAL	CAL	GTY	RCH	NZH	CLT	DOV	NSH	KEN	MLW	DAY	CHI	NHA	PPR	IRP; 13	MCH	BRI	CAL	RCH	DOV	KAN	CLT		ATL; 29	PHO; 9	DAR	HOM; 4		52nd	637	
2004	Phoenix Racing	1	Dodge																														MEM; 10						52nd	637	
2005	Chip Ganassi Racing	41	Dodge	DAY; 9	CAL; 5	MXC; 14	LVS; 6	ATL; DNQ	**NSH**; 1*	BRI; 3	TEX; 3	PHO; 32	TAL; 32	DAR; 12	RCH; 31	CLT; 5	DOV; 2	NSH; 3	KEN; 4	MLW; 12	DAY; 20	CHI; 10	NHA; 14	PPR; 7	GTY; 1*	**IRP**; 3	GLN; 41	MCH; 36	BRI; 11	CAL; 12	RCH; 7	DOV; 4	KAN; 6	CLT; 35	MEM; 33	TEX; 4	PHO; 8	HOM; 33	4th	4453	
2005	Fitz Motorsports	40	Dodge					ATL; 19																															4th	4453	
2006	Chip Ganassi Racing	41	Dodge	DAY; 9	CAL; 11	MXC; 36	LVS; 10	ATL; 42	BRI; 27	TEX; 13	NSH; 19	PHO; 2	TAL; 17	RCH; 36	DAR; 23	CLT; 21	DOV; 10	NSH; 23	KEN; 39	MLW	DAY; 40	CHI; 8	NHA; 17	MAR; 4	GTY; 4	IRP; 2	GLN; 28	MCH; 7	BRI; 42	CAL; 19	RCH; 5	DOV; 6	KAN; 7	CLT; 38	MEM; 7	TEX; 36	PHO; 7	HOM; 42	10th	3670	
2007	Chip Ganassi Racing	41	Dodge	DAY; 38	CAL; 36	MXC	LVS; 30	ATL; 39	BRI; 16	NSH	TEX; 35	PHO	TAL; 27	RCH; 8	DAR	CLT; 42	DOV; 27	NSH	KEN	MLW	NHA; 9	DAY; 7	CHI; 15	GTY; 1*	IRP	CGV	GLN	MCH; 20	BRI; 33	CAL; 11	RCH	DOV; 5	KAN						30th	1881	
2007	Rusty Wallace Racing	66	Dodge																															CLT; 25	MEM	TEX	PHO	HOM	30th	1881	
2008	Fitz Motorsports	22	Dodge	DAY	CAL	LVS	ATL	BRI	NSH	TEX	PHO	MXC	TAL; 29	RCH	DAR	CLT	DOV	NSH	KEN	MLW	NHA	DAY	CHI																105th	157	
2008	Chip Ganassi Racing	40	Dodge																					GTY; 29	IRP	CGV	GLN	MCH	BRI	CAL	RCH	DOV	KAN	CLT	MEM	TEX	PHO	HOM	105th	157	
2009	Braun Racing	32	Toyota	DAY	CAL	LVS	BRI	TEX	NSH	PHO	TAL	RCH	DAR	CLT	DOV	NSH	KEN	MLW	NHA	DAY	CHI	GTY; 2	IRP	IOW	GLN												PHO; 3	HOM	47th	1059	
2009	Phoenix Racing	1	Chevy																							MCH; 12	BRI; 35	CGV	ATL; 10	RCH									47th	1059	
2009	Braun Racing	10	Toyota																												DOV; 7	KAN; 10	CAL	CLT; 16	MEM	TEX			47th	1059	
2010	Braun Racing	32	Toyota	DAY	CAL	LVS	BRI; 7	NSH; 2	PHO; 12	TEX; 3		RCH; 8	DAR	DOV; 4	CLT; 8	NSH; 7	KEN; 5	ROA	NHA; 8	DAY; 22	CHI; 8	GTY; 2	IRP; 5	IOW; 36	GLN	MCH; 8	BRI; 8	CGV	ATL; 34	RCH; 5									12th	3739	
2010	Braun Racing	10	Toyota								TAL; 40																												12th	3739	
2010	Turner Motorsports	32	Toyota																												DOV; 4	KAN; 36	CAL; 10	CLT; 7	GTY; 6	TEX; 7	PHO; 5	HOM; 14	12th	3739	
2011	Turner Motorsports	32	Chevy	DAY; 5	PHO; 5		BRI; 34		TEX; 7	TAL; 9	NSH; 8	RCH; 12	DAR; 8	DOV; 3	IOW; 4	CLT; 5	CHI; 6		ROA; 1	DAY; 3		NHA; 15	NSH; 8	IRP; 9	IOW; 6	GLN; 13	CGV; 25	BRI; 12	ATL; 32	RCH; 8	CHI; 10	DOV; 7							5th	1062	
2011	Turner Motorsports	30	Chevy			LVS; 11		CAL; 14										MCH; 11			KEN; 17																		5th	1062	
2011	MacDonald Motorsports	82	Dodge																														KAN; 26	CLT; 32	TEX; 16	PHO; 35	HOM; 25		5th	1062	
2012	Hamilton Means Racing	52	Chevy	DAY; 34	PHO	LVS	BRI	CAL	TEX	RCH	TAL	DAR	IOW																										39th	124	
2012	Biagi-DenBeste Racing	98	Ford											CLT; 16	DOV	MCH	ROA	KEN; 13	DAY	NHA	CHI	IND; 33	IOW	GLN	CGV	BRI	ATL; 32	RCH	CHI	KEN	DOV	CLT; 12	KAN	TEX	PHO	HOM			39th	124	
2013	The Motorsports Group	40	Chevy	DAY; 30	PHO; 18								CLT; 37	DOV; 29	IOW; 15	MCH; 24	ROA; 37	KEN; 22	DAY; 39	NHA; 34	CHI; 30	IND; 28	IOW; 31	GLN; 16	MOH; 36	BRI; 28	ATL; 21	RCH; 27	CHI; 33	KEN; 21	DOV	KAN							18th	524	
2013	Richard Petty Motorsports	43	Ford			LVS; 16	BRI; 18	CAL; 17	TEX; 15	RCH; 10	TAL; 22	DAR; 18																											18th	524	
2013	Leavine Family Racing	95	Ford																														CLT; 37	TEX	PHO	HOM			18th	524	
2017	JD Motorsports	15	Chevy	DAY	ATL	LVS	PHO	CAL	TEX	BRI	RCH	TAL	CLT	DOV	POC	MCH	IOW	DAY	KEN	NHA; 39	IND; 38	IOW; 39	GLN	MOH	BRI; DNQ	ROA	DAR; DNQ	RCH; 39	CHI	KEN	DOV; 35	CLT; 37	KAN; 38	TEX; 36	PHO	HOM			112th	0^{1}	

==== Camping World Truck Series ====
NASCAR Camping World Truck Series results
Year	Team	No.	Make	1	2	3	4	5	6	7	8	9	10	11	12	13	14	15	16	17	18	19	20	21	22	23	NCWTC	Pts	Ref
2016	MB Motorsports	63	Chevy	DAY; DNQ	ATL	MAR	KAN	DOV	CLT	TEX	IOW	GTW	KEN	ELD													97th	0^{1}	
2016	Premium Motorsports	49	Chevy												POC; 18	BRI	MCH; 21	MSP	CHI; 28	NHA	LVS	TAL; 18	MAR	TEX; 24	PHO	HOM; 28	97th	0^{1}	
2018	Premium Motorsports	15	Chevy	DAY	ATL	LVS	MAR	DOV; 30	KAN	CLT	TEX; 27	IOW	GTW	CHI	KEN	ELD	POC; 30										72nd	17	
2018	Premium Motorsports	50	Chevy															MCH; 28	BRI	MSP	LVS	TAL	MAR				72nd	17	
2018	Premium Motorsports	49	Chevy																					TEX; 20	PHO	HOM	72nd	17	

=== ARCA Re/Max Series ===
(key) (Bold – Pole position awarded by qualifying time. Italics – Pole position earned by points standings or practice time. * – Most laps led.)

ARCA Re/Max Series results
Year	Team	No.	Make	1	2	3	4	5	6	7	8	9	10	11	12	13	14	15	16	17	18	19	20	21	22	ARSC	Pts	Ref
2004	Braun Racing	77	Dodge	DAY	NSH	SLM	KEN	TOL	CLT; 4*	KAN	POC															39th	720	
2004	Chip Ganassi Racing	77	Dodge									MCH; 1*	SBO	BLN	KEN	GTW	POC	LER	NSH	ISF	TOL	DSF	CHI	SLM	TAL; 2	39th	720	

^{*} Season still in progress
^{1} Ineligible for series points
