= 2017 Ford EcoBoost 400 =

Race details
- Race 36 of 36 in the 2017 Monster Energy NASCAR Cup Series
- The 2017 Ford EcoBoost 400 program cover. Artwork by Guy Harvey.
- Date: November 19, 2017
- Location: Homestead–Miami Speedway in Homestead, Florida
- Course: Permanent racing facility
- Course length: 1.5 miles (2.4 km)
- Distance: 267 laps, 400.5 mi (640.8 km)
- Weather: Temperatures hovering around 71.9 °F (22.2 °C); wind speeds up to 8 miles per hour (13 km/h)
- Average speed: 131.900 miles per hour (212.272 km/h)

Pole position
Driver	Denny Hamlin	Joe Gibbs Racing
- Time: 31.038

Most laps led
Driver	Kyle Larson	Chip Ganassi Racing
- Laps: 145

Winner
No. 78	Martin Truex Jr.	Furniture Row Racing

Television in the United States
- Network: NBC
- Announcers: Rick Allen, Jeff Burton and Steve Letarte

Radio in the United States
- Radio: MRN
- Booth announcers: Joe Moore, Jeff Striegle and Rusty Wallace
- Turn announcers: Dave Moody (1 & 2) and Mike Bagley (3 & 4)

The 2017 Ford EcoBoost 400 was a Monster Energy NASCAR Cup Series race that was held on November 19, 2017, at Homestead–Miami Speedway in Homestead, Florida. Contested over 267 laps on the 1.5 mile (2.4 km) oval, it was the 36th and final race of the 2017 Monster Energy NASCAR Cup Series season, and was also the final race for the Chevrolet SS which debuted at the 2013 Daytona 500, as its replacement for 2018 would be the Camaro ZL1.

== Report ==
=== Championship drivers ===
Kyle Busch was the first of the four drivers to clinch a spot in the Championship 4, winning the first race of the Round of 8 at Martinsville.

Kevin Harvick clinched the second spot in the Championship 4, winning the second race of the Round of 8 at Texas.

Martin Truex Jr. clinched the third spot in the Championship 4 after the Texas race based on points.

Brad Keselowski clinched the final spot based on points after the Phoenix race.

=== Entry list ===
No.	Driver	Team	Manufacturer
1	Jamie McMurray	Chip Ganassi Racing	Chevrolet
2	Brad Keselowski (CC)	Team Penske	Ford
3	Austin Dillon	Richard Childress Racing	Chevrolet
4	Kevin Harvick (CC)	Stewart–Haas Racing	Ford
5	Kasey Kahne	Hendrick Motorsports	Chevrolet
6	Trevor Bayne	Roush Fenway Racing	Ford
10	Danica Patrick	Stewart–Haas Racing	Ford
11	Denny Hamlin	Joe Gibbs Racing	Toyota
13	Ty Dillon (R)	Germain Racing	Chevrolet
14	Clint Bowyer	Stewart–Haas Racing	Ford
15	Reed Sorenson	Premium Motorsports	Chevrolet
17	Ricky Stenhouse Jr.	Roush Fenway Racing	Ford
18	Kyle Busch (CC)	Joe Gibbs Racing	Toyota
19	Daniel Suárez (R)	Joe Gibbs Racing	Toyota
20	Matt Kenseth	Joe Gibbs Racing	Toyota
21	Ryan Blaney	Wood Brothers Racing	Ford
22	Joey Logano	Team Penske	Ford
23	Corey LaJoie (i)	BK Racing	Toyota
24	Chase Elliott	Hendrick Motorsports	Chevrolet
27	Paul Menard	Richard Childress Racing	Chevrolet
31	Ryan Newman	Richard Childress Racing	Chevrolet
32	Matt DiBenedetto	Go Fas Racing	Ford
33	Jeffrey Earnhardt	Circle Sport – The Motorsports Group	Chevrolet
34	Landon Cassill	Front Row Motorsports	Ford
37	Chris Buescher	JTG Daugherty Racing	Chevrolet
38	David Ragan	Front Row Motorsports	Ford
41	Kurt Busch	Stewart–Haas Racing	Ford
42	Kyle Larson	Chip Ganassi Racing	Chevrolet
43	Aric Almirola	Richard Petty Motorsports	Ford
47	A. J. Allmendinger	JTG Daugherty Racing	Chevrolet
48	Jimmie Johnson	Hendrick Motorsports	Chevrolet
51	Ray Black Jr. (i)	Rick Ware Racing	Chevrolet
66	David Starr (i)	MBM Motorsports	Chevrolet
72	Cole Whitt	TriStar Motorsports	Chevrolet
77	Erik Jones (R)	Furniture Row Racing	Toyota
78	Martin Truex Jr. (CC)	Furniture Row Racing	Toyota
83	Joey Gase (i)	BK Racing	Toyota
88	Dale Earnhardt Jr.	Hendrick Motorsports	Chevrolet
95	Michael McDowell	Leavine Family Racing	Chevrolet
Official entry list

== Practice ==
=== First practice ===
Kyle Busch was the fastest in the first practice session with a time of 31.269 seconds and a speed of 172.695 mph (277.926 km/h).

Pos	No.	Driver	Team	Manufacturer	Time	Speed
1	18	Kyle Busch	Joe Gibbs Racing	Toyota	31.269	172.695
2	78	Martin Truex Jr.	Furniture Row Racing	Toyota	31.299	172.529
3	4	Kevin Harvick	Stewart–Haas Racing	Ford	31.420	171.865
Official first practice results

=== Second practice ===
Denny Hamlin was the fastest in the second practice session with a time of 31.555 seconds and a speed of 171.130 mph (275.407 km/h).

Pos	No.	Driver	Team	Manufacturer	Time	Speed
1	11	Denny Hamlin	Joe Gibbs Racing	Toyota	31.555	171.130
2	88	Dale Earnhardt Jr.	Hendrick Motorsports	Chevrolet	31.638	170.681
3	78	Martin Truex Jr.	Furniture Row Racing	Toyota	31.761	170.020
Official second practice results

=== Final practice ===
Martin Truex Jr. was the fastest in the final practice session with a time of 31.543 seconds and a speed of 171.195 mph (275.512 km/h).

Pos	No.	Driver	Team	Manufacturer	Time	Speed
1	78	Martin Truex Jr.	Furniture Row Racing	Toyota	31.543	171.195
2	14	Clint Bowyer	Stewart–Haas Racing	Ford	31.804	169.790
3	11	Denny Hamlin	Joe Gibbs Racing	Toyota	31.807	169.774
Official final practice results

== Qualifying ==
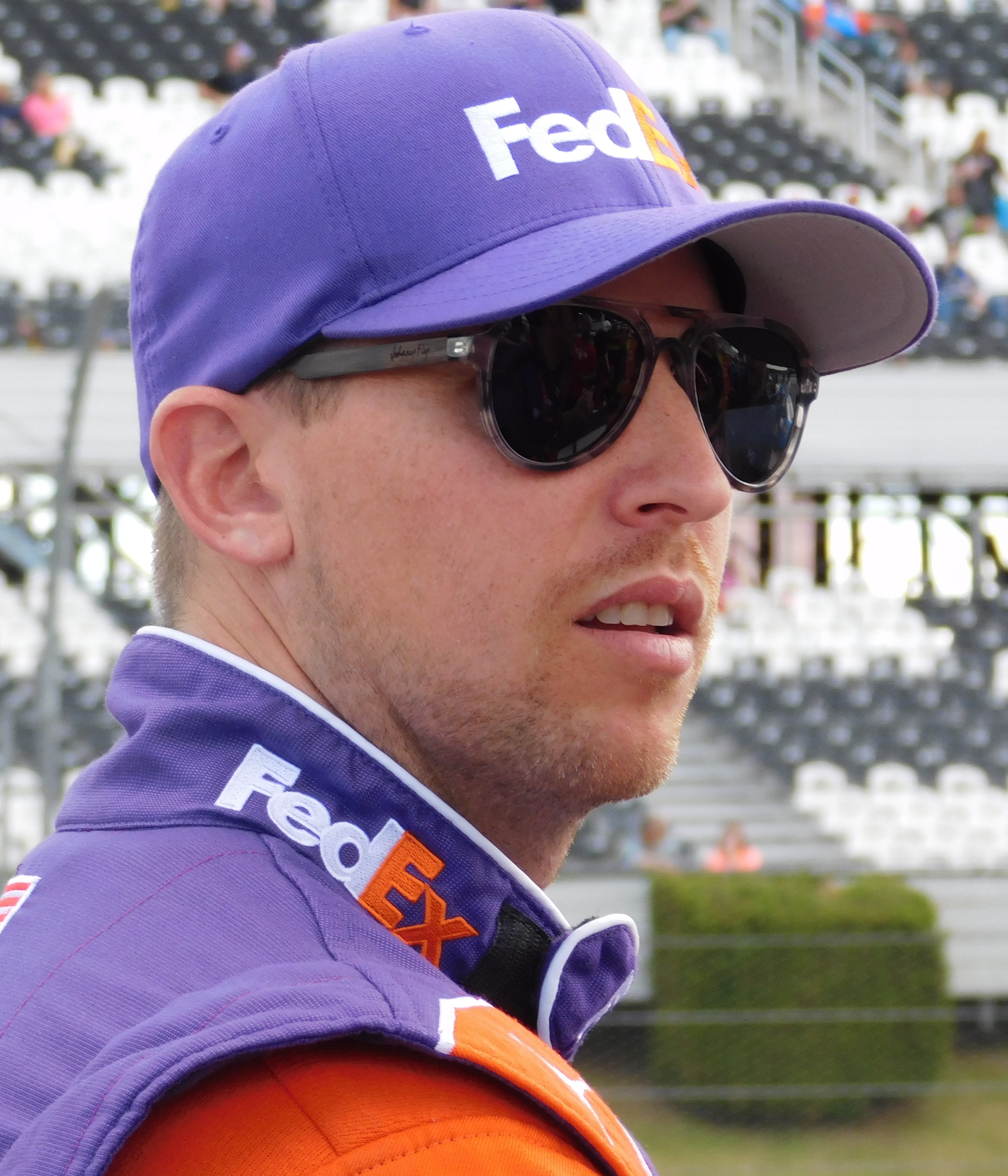
Denny Hamlin scored the pole position.

Denny Hamlin scored the pole for the race with a time of 31.038 and a speed of 173.980 mph (279.994 km/h).

=== Qualifying results ===
Pos	No.	Driver	Team	Manufacturer	R1	R2	R3
1	11	Denny Hamlin	Joe Gibbs Racing	Toyota	30.931	30.949	31.038
2	78	Martin Truex Jr. (CC)	Furniture Row Racing	Toyota	30.743	30.889	31.043
3	18	Kyle Busch (CC)	Joe Gibbs Racing	Toyota	30.904	30.918	31.047
4	20	Matt Kenseth	Joe Gibbs Racing	Toyota	31.405	30.972	31.272
5	2	Brad Keselowski (CC)	Team Penske	Ford	31.228	31.322	31.313
6	17	Ricky Stenhouse Jr.	Roush Fenway Racing	Ford	31.105	31.019	31.330
7	42	Kyle Larson	Chip Ganassi Racing	Chevrolet	31.188	31.081	31.358
8	41	Kurt Busch	Stewart–Haas Racing	Ford	31.183	31.195	31.376
9	4	Kevin Harvick (CC)	Stewart–Haas Racing	Ford	31.103	30.987	31.418
10	19	Daniel Suárez (R)	Joe Gibbs Racing	Toyota	31.286	31.247	31.434
11	21	Ryan Blaney	Wood Brothers Racing	Ford	31.288	31.204	31.532
12	6	Trevor Bayne	Roush Fenway Racing	Ford	31.502	31.317	31.556
13	1	Jamie McMurray	Chip Ganassi Racing	Chevrolet	31.426	31.322	—
14	77	Erik Jones (R)	Furniture Row Racing	Toyota	31.267	31.365	—
15	27	Paul Menard	Richard Childress Racing	Chevrolet	31.337	31.367	—
16	14	Clint Bowyer	Stewart–Haas Racing	Ford	31.208	31.396	—
17	3	Austin Dillon	Richard Childress Racing	Chevrolet	31.348	31.459	—
18	24	Chase Elliott	Hendrick Motorsports	Chevrolet	31.243	31.470	—
19	22	Joey Logano	Team Penske	Ford	31.391	31.524	—
20	43	Aric Almirola	Richard Petty Motorsports	Ford	31.457	31.541	—
21	31	Ryan Newman	Richard Childress Racing	Chevrolet	31.486	31.577	—
22	48	Jimmie Johnson	Hendrick Motorsports	Chevrolet	31.355	31.595	—
23	95	Michael McDowell	Leavine Family Racing	Chevrolet	31.255	31.640	—
24	88	Dale Earnhardt Jr.	Hendrick Motorsports	Chevrolet	31.320	0.000	—
25	10	Danica Patrick	Stewart–Haas Racing	Ford	31.588	—	—
26	47	A. J. Allmendinger	JTG Daugherty Racing	Chevrolet	31.601	—	—
27	5	Kasey Kahne	Hendrick Motorsports	Chevrolet	31.621	—	—
28	34	Landon Cassill	Front Row Motorsports	Ford	31.632	—	—
29	37	Chris Buescher	JTG Daugherty Racing	Chevrolet	31.647	—	—
30	38	David Ragan	Front Row Motorsports	Ford	31.650	—	—
31	32	Matt DiBenedetto	Go Fas Racing	Ford	31.814	—	—
32	13	Ty Dillon (R)	Germain Racing	Chevrolet	31.831	—	—
33	72	Cole Whitt	TriStar Motorsports	Chevrolet	32.014	—	—
34	23	Corey LaJoie (i)	BK Racing	Toyota	32.301	—	—
35	83	Joey Gase (i)	BK Racing	Toyota	32.796	—	—
36	33	Jeffrey Earnhardt	Circle Sport – The Motorsports Group	Chevrolet	32.801	—	—
37	15	Reed Sorenson	Premium Motorsports	Chevrolet	32.997	—	—
38	66	David Starr (i)	MBM Motorsports	Chevrolet	33.025	—	—
39	51	Ray Black Jr. (i)	Rick Ware Racing	Chevrolet	34.010	—	—
Official qualifying results

== Race results ==
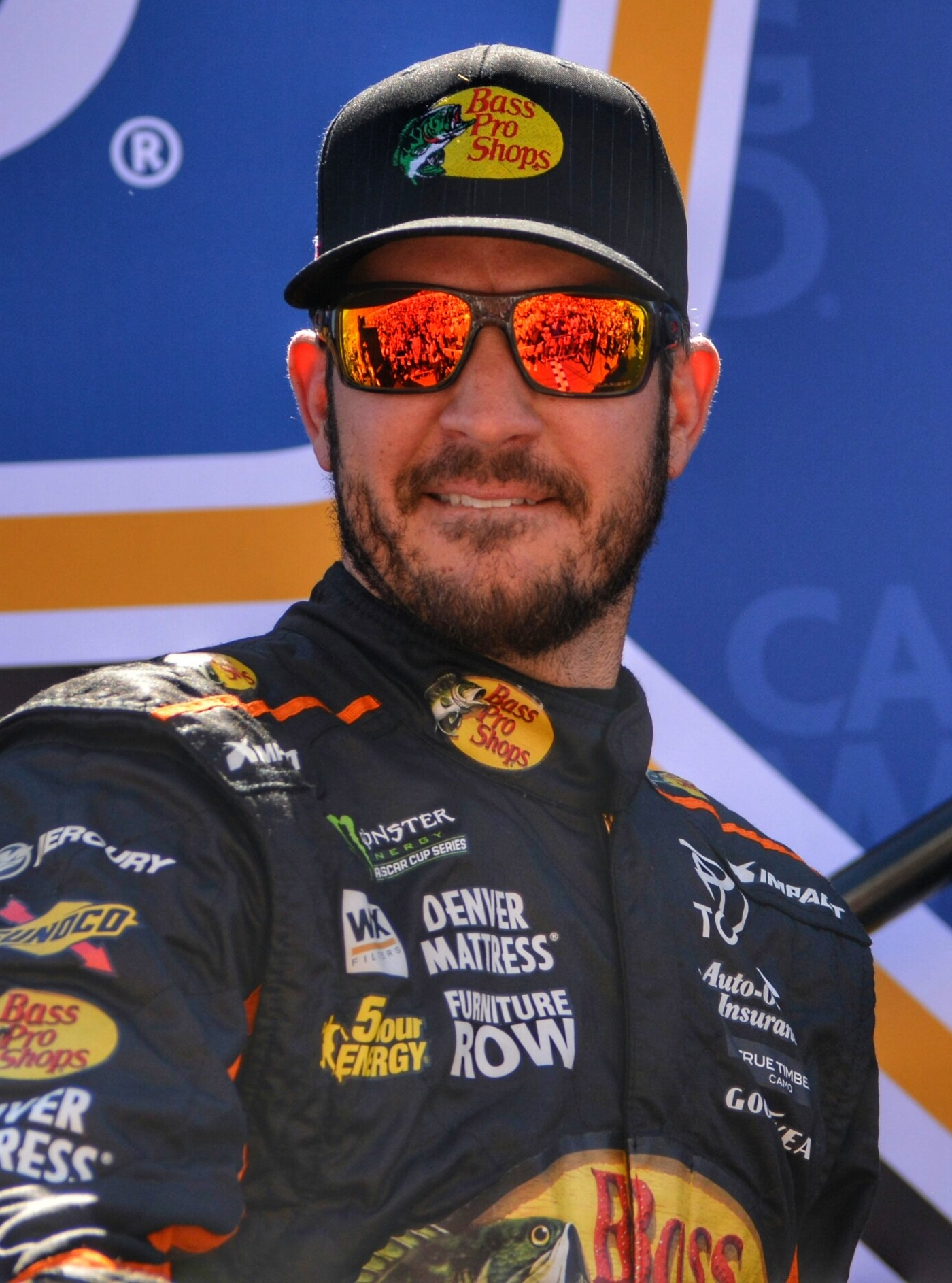
Martin Truex Jr. won the race and his first Cup Series championship title.

=== Stage results ===
- Note: Martin Truex Jr., Kyle Busch, Kevin Harvick, and Brad Keselowski were not eligible for stage points because of their participation in the Championship 4.

Stage 1 Laps: 80

Pos	No	Driver	Team	Manufacturer	Points
1	42	Kyle Larson	Chip Ganassi Racing	Chevrolet	10
2	2	Brad Keselowski (CC)	Team Penske	Ford	0
3	18	Kyle Busch (CC)	Joe Gibbs Racing	Toyota	0
4	4	Kevin Harvick (CC)	Stewart–Haas Racing	Ford	0
5	78	Martin Truex Jr. (CC)	Furniture Row Racing	Toyota	0
6	24	Chase Elliott	Hendrick Motorsports	Chevrolet	5
7	41	Kurt Busch	Stewart–Haas Racing	Ford	4
8	11	Denny Hamlin	Joe Gibbs Racing	Toyota	3
9	22	Joey Logano	Team Penske	Ford	2
10	14	Clint Bowyer	Stewart–Haas Racing	Ford	1
Official stage one results

Stage 2 Laps: 80

Pos	No	Driver	Team	Manufacturer	Points
1	42	Kyle Larson	Chip Ganassi Racing	Chevrolet	10
2	78	Martin Truex Jr. (CC)	Furniture Row Racing	Toyota	0
3	4	Kevin Harvick (CC)	Stewart–Haas Racing	Ford	0
4	18	Kyle Busch (CC)	Joe Gibbs Racing	Toyota	0
5	2	Brad Keselowski (CC)	Team Penske	Ford	0
6	41	Kurt Busch	Stewart–Haas Racing	Ford	5
7	20	Matt Kenseth	Joe Gibbs Racing	Toyota	4
8	22	Joey Logano	Team Penske	Ford	3
9	24	Chase Elliott	Hendrick Motorsports	Chevrolet	2
10	11	Denny Hamlin	Joe Gibbs Racing	Toyota	1
Official stage two results

=== Final stage results ===
Stage 3 Laps: 107

Pos	No	Driver	Team	Manufacturer	Laps	Points
1	78	Martin Truex Jr. (CC)	Furniture Row Racing	Toyota	267	40
2	18	Kyle Busch (CC)	Joe Gibbs Racing	Toyota	267	35
3	42	Kyle Larson	Chip Ganassi Racing	Chevrolet	267	54
4	4	Kevin Harvick (CC)	Stewart–Haas Racing	Ford	267	33
5	24	Chase Elliott	Hendrick Motorsports	Chevrolet	267	39
6	22	Joey Logano	Team Penske	Ford	267	36
7	2	Brad Keselowski (CC)	Team Penske	Ford	267	30
8	20	Matt Kenseth	Joe Gibbs Racing	Toyota	267	33
9	11	Denny Hamlin	Joe Gibbs Racing	Toyota	267	32
10	31	Ryan Newman	Richard Childress Racing	Chevrolet	267	27
11	3	Austin Dillon	Richard Childress Racing	Chevrolet	267	26
12	14	Clint Bowyer	Stewart–Haas Racing	Ford	267	26
13	1	Jamie McMurray	Chip Ganassi Racing	Chevrolet	266	24
14	47	A. J. Allmendinger	JTG Daugherty Racing	Chevrolet	266	23
15	17	Ricky Stenhouse Jr.	Roush Fenway Racing	Ford	266	22
16	27	Paul Menard	Richard Childress Racing	Chevrolet	265	21
17	38	David Ragan	Front Row Motorsports	Ford	265	20
18	43	Aric Almirola	Richard Petty Motorsports	Ford	265	19
19	6	Trevor Bayne	Roush Fenway Racing	Ford	265	18
20	37	Chris Buescher	JTG Daugherty Racing	Chevrolet	265	17
21	77	Erik Jones (R)	Furniture Row Racing	Toyota	265	16
22	41	Kurt Busch	Stewart–Haas Racing	Ford	265	24
23	34	Landon Cassill	Front Row Motorsports	Ford	265	14
24	95	Michael McDowell	Leavine Family Racing	Chevrolet	265	13
25	88	Dale Earnhardt Jr.	Hendrick Motorsports	Chevrolet	264	12
26	13	Ty Dillon (R)	Germain Racing	Chevrolet	264	11
27	48	Jimmie Johnson	Hendrick Motorsports	Chevrolet	264	10
28	72	Cole Whitt	TriStar Motorsports	Chevrolet	264	9
29	21	Ryan Blaney	Wood Brothers Racing	Ford	264	8
30	32	Matt DiBenedetto	Go Fas Racing	Ford	263	7
31	23	Corey LaJoie (i)	BK Racing	Toyota	261	0
32	33	Jeffrey Earnhardt	Circle Sport – The Motorsports Group	Chevrolet	259	5
33	5	Kasey Kahne	Hendrick Motorsports	Chevrolet	234	4
34	19	Daniel Suárez (R)	Joe Gibbs Racing	Toyota	225	3
35	15	Reed Sorenson	Premium Motorsports	Chevrolet	212	2
36	66	David Starr (i)	MBM Motorsports	Chevrolet	175	0
37	10	Danica Patrick	Stewart–Haas Racing	Ford	139	1
38	51	Ray Black Jr. (i)	Rick Ware Racing	Chevrolet	49	0
39	83	Joey Gase (i)	BK Racing	Toyota	4	0
Official race results

With the win at Miami, Truex is the 2017 Monster Energy NASCAR Cup Series Champion. While Busch finished 2nd in the championship. Harvick finished 3rd in the championship, and Keselowski finished 4th of the Championship 4.

=== Race statistics ===
- Lead changes: 4 among different drivers
- Cautions/Laps: 5 for 26
- Red flags: 0
- Time of race: 3 hours, 2 minutes, 11 seconds
- Average speed: 131.900 miles per hour (212.272 km/h)

== Media ==
=== Television ===
NBC covered the race on the television side. Rick Allen, Jeff Burton and Steve Letarte had the call in the booth for the race. Dave Burns, Parker Kligerman, Marty Snider and Kelli Stavast reported from pit lane during the race. While the race itself aired on NBC, NBCSN aired NBCSN NASCAR Hot Pass, a simultaneous live feed dedicated to each of the Championship drivers, with commentary by Leigh Diffey and Dale Jarrett. Also, three different angles from in-car cameras and a track map tracked the driver's position and changes throughout the field.

NBC
Booth announcers	Pit reporters
Lap-by-lap: Rick Allen; Color-commentator: Jeff Burton; Color-commentator: Steve Letarte	Dave Burns; Parker Kligerman; Marty Snider; Kelli Stavast

=== Radio ===
MRN had the radio call for the race, which was simulcast on Sirius XM NASCAR Radio.

MRN
Booth announcers	Turn announcers	Pit reporters
Lead announcer: Joe Moore; Announcer: Jeff Striegle; Announcer: Rusty Wallace	Turns 1 & 2: Dave Moody; Turns 3 & 4: Mike Bagley	Alex Hayden; Winston Kelley; Steve Post

== Final season standings ==
Drivers' Championship standings

	Pos	Driver	Points
2	1	Martin Truex Jr.	5,040
	2	Kyle Busch	5,035 (−5)
2	3	Kevin Harvick	5,033 (−7)
	4	Brad Keselowski	5,030 (−10)
	5	Chase Elliott	2,377 (−2,663)
	6	Denny Hamlin	2,353 (−2,687)
	7	Matt Kenseth	2,344 (−2,696)
1	8	Kyle Larson	2,320 (−2,720)
1	9	Ryan Blaney	2,305 (−2,735)
	10	Jimmie Johnson	2,260 (−2,780)
2	11	Austin Dillon	2,224 (−2,816)
	12	Jamie McMurray	2,224 (−2,816)
2	13	Ricky Stenhouse Jr.	2,222 (−2,818)
1	14	Kurt Busch	2,217 (−2,823)
1	15	Kasey Kahne	2,198 (−2,842)
	16	Ryan Newman	2,196 (−2,844)
Official driver's standings

Manufacturers' Championship standings

Pos	Manufacturer	Points
1	Toyota	1,292
2	Ford	1,254 (−38)
3	Chevrolet	1,247 (−45)
Official manufacturers' standings

- Note: Only the first 16 positions are included for the driver standings.

Previous race: 2017 Can-Am 500	Monster Energy NASCAR Cup Series; 2017 season	Next race: 2018 Daytona 500
