= 2017 Can-Am 500 =

Race details
- Race 35 of 36 in the 2017 Monster Energy NASCAR Cup Series
- Date: November 12, 2017
- Location: Phoenix International Raceway in Avondale, Arizona
- Course: Permanent racing facility
- Course length: 1 miles (1.6 km)
- Distance: 312 laps, 312 mi (499.2 km)
- Average speed: 105.534 miles per hour (169.841 km/h)

Pole position
Driver	Ryan Blaney	Wood Brothers Racing
- Time: 26.098

Most laps led
Driver	Denny Hamlin	Joe Gibbs Racing
- Laps: 193

Winner
No. 20	Matt Kenseth	Joe Gibbs Racing

Television in the United States
- Network: NBC
- Announcers: Rick Allen, Jeff Burton and Steve Letarte

Radio in the United States
- Radio: MRN
- Booth announcers: Joe Moore, Jeff Striegle and Rusty Wallace
- Turn announcers: Kyle Rickey (1 & 2) and Buddy Long (3 & 4)

The 2017 Can-Am 500 was a Monster Energy NASCAR Cup Series race held on November 12, 2017, at Phoenix International Raceway in Avondale, Arizona. Contested over 312 laps on the one mile (1.6 km) oval, it was the 35th race of the 2017 Monster Energy NASCAR Cup Series season, ninth race of the Playoffs, and final race of the Round of 8. Matt Kenseth recorded his 39th Series and final win in his Circle K Toyota Camry.

== Entry list ==
No.	Driver	Team	Manufacturer
00	Derrike Cope	StarCom Racing	Chevrolet
1	Jamie McMurray	Chip Ganassi Racing	Chevrolet
2	Brad Keselowski	Team Penske	Ford
3	Austin Dillon	Richard Childress Racing	Chevrolet
4	Kevin Harvick	Stewart–Haas Racing	Ford
5	Kasey Kahne	Hendrick Motorsports	Chevrolet
6	Trevor Bayne	Roush Fenway Racing	Ford
7	Joey Gase (i)	Premium Motorsports	Chevrolet
10	Danica Patrick	Stewart–Haas Racing	Ford
11	Denny Hamlin	Joe Gibbs Racing	Toyota
13	Ty Dillon (R)	Germain Racing	Chevrolet
14	Clint Bowyer	Stewart–Haas Racing	Ford
15	D. J. Kennington	Premium Motorsports	Chevrolet
17	Ricky Stenhouse Jr.	Roush Fenway Racing	Ford
18	Kyle Busch	Joe Gibbs Racing	Toyota
19	Daniel Suárez (R)	Joe Gibbs Racing	Toyota
20	Matt Kenseth	Joe Gibbs Racing	Toyota
21	Ryan Blaney	Wood Brothers Racing	Ford
22	Joey Logano	Team Penske	Ford
23	Corey LaJoie (R)	BK Racing	Toyota
24	Chase Elliott	Hendrick Motorsports	Chevrolet
27	Paul Menard	Richard Childress Racing	Chevrolet
31	Ryan Newman	Richard Childress Racing	Chevrolet
32	Matt DiBenedetto	Go Fas Racing	Ford
33	Jeffrey Earnhardt	Circle Sport – The Motorsports Group	Chevrolet
34	Landon Cassill	Front Row Motorsports	Ford
37	Chris Buescher	JTG Daugherty Racing	Chevrolet
38	David Ragan	Front Row Motorsports	Ford
41	Kurt Busch	Stewart–Haas Racing	Ford
42	Kyle Larson	Chip Ganassi Racing	Chevrolet
43	Aric Almirola	Richard Petty Motorsports	Ford
47	A. J. Allmendinger	JTG Daugherty Racing	Chevrolet
48	Jimmie Johnson	Hendrick Motorsports	Chevrolet
51	Kyle Weatherman	Rick Ware Racing	Chevrolet
66	David Starr (i)	MBM Motorsports	Toyota
72	Cole Whitt	TriStar Motorsports	Chevrolet
77	Erik Jones (R)	Furniture Row Racing	Toyota
78	Martin Truex Jr.	Furniture Row Racing	Toyota
88	Dale Earnhardt Jr.	Hendrick Motorsports	Chevrolet
95	Michael McDowell	Leavine Family Racing	Chevrolet
Official entry list

== Practice ==
=== First practice ===
Chase Elliott was the fastest in the first practice session with a time of 26.207 seconds and a speed of 137.368 mph (221.072 km/h).

Pos	No.	Driver	Team	Manufacturer	Time	Speed
1	24	Chase Elliott	Hendrick Motorsports	Chevrolet	26.207	137.368
2	78	Martin Truex Jr.	Furniture Row Racing	Toyota	26.231	137.242
3	11	Denny Hamlin	Joe Gibbs Racing	Toyota	26.288	136.945
Official first practice results

== Qualifying ==
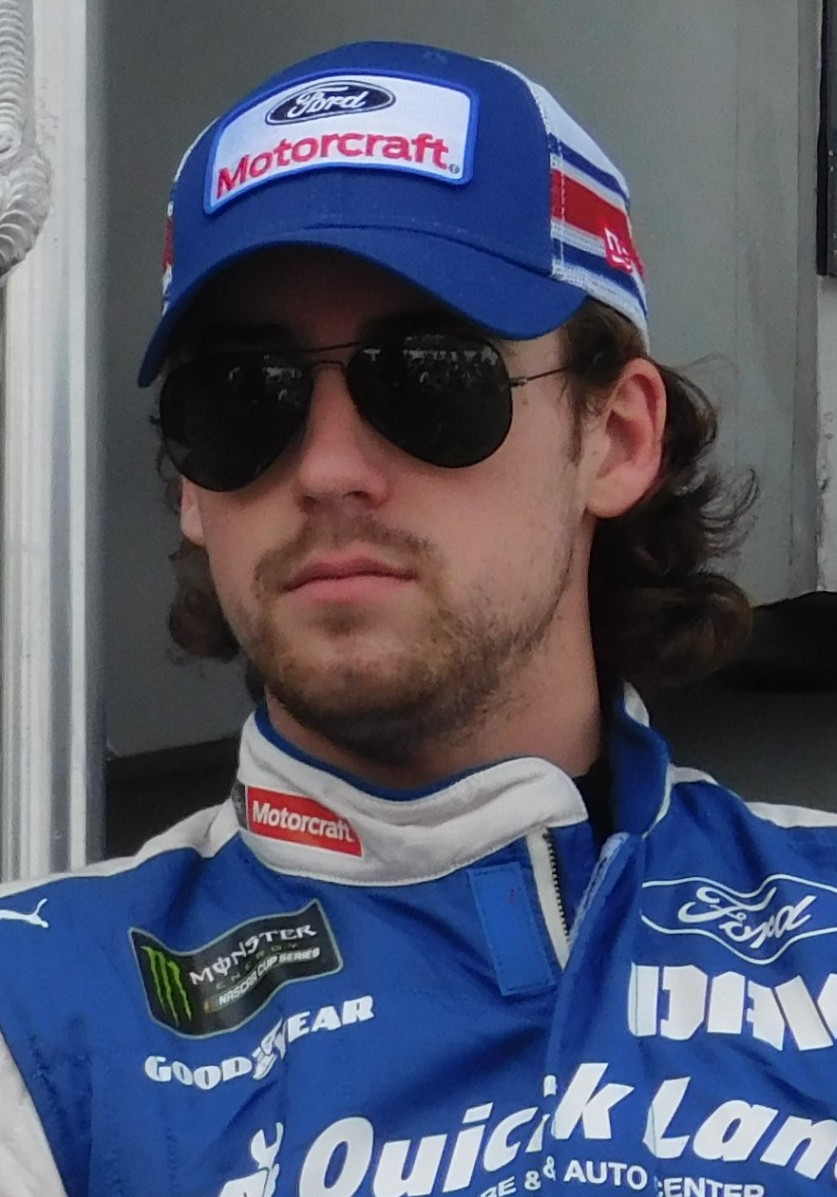
Ryan Blaney scored the pole position.

Ryan Blaney scored the pole for the race with a time of 26.098 and a speed of 137.942 mph (221.996 km/h).

=== Qualifying results ===
Pos	No.	Driver	Team	Manufacturer	R1	R2	R3
1	21	Ryan Blaney	Wood Brothers Racing	Ford	26.254	26.168	26.098
2	11	Denny Hamlin	Joe Gibbs Racing	Toyota	26.369	26.176	26.099
3	42	Kyle Larson	Chip Ganassi Racing	Chevrolet	26.182	26.161	26.101
4	24	Chase Elliott	Hendrick Motorsports	Chevrolet	26.307	26.200	26.155
5	78	Martin Truex Jr.	Furniture Row Racing	Toyota	26.437	26.225	26.166
6	4	Kevin Harvick	Stewart–Haas Racing	Ford	26.245	26.120	26.230
7	20	Matt Kenseth	Joe Gibbs Racing	Toyota	26.309	26.067	26.241
8	18	Kyle Busch	Joe Gibbs Racing	Toyota	26.429	26.178	26.263
9	22	Joey Logano	Team Penske	Ford	26.297	26.260	26.333
10	19	Daniel Suárez (R)	Joe Gibbs Racing	Toyota	26.492	26.286	26.380
11	77	Erik Jones (R)	Furniture Row Racing	Toyota	26.394	26.215	26.398
12	48	Jimmie Johnson	Hendrick Motorsports	Chevrolet	26.378	26.265	26.427
13	1	Jamie McMurray	Chip Ganassi Racing	Chevrolet	26.234	26.308	—
14	88	Dale Earnhardt Jr.	Hendrick Motorsports	Chevrolet	26.331	26.408	—
15	41	Kurt Busch	Stewart–Haas Racing	Ford	26.405	26.411	—
16	2	Brad Keselowski	Team Penske	Ford	26.387	26.412	—
17	5	Kasey Kahne	Hendrick Motorsports	Chevrolet	26.476	26.416	—
18	31	Ryan Newman	Richard Childress Racing	Chevrolet	26.509	26.462	—
19	27	Paul Menard	Richard Childress Racing	Chevrolet	26.490	26.497	—
20	14	Clint Bowyer	Stewart–Haas Racing	Ford	26.422	26.535	—
21	3	Austin Dillon	Richard Childress Racing	Chevrolet	26.507	26.551	—
22	43	Aric Almirola	Richard Petty Motorsports	Ford	26.508	26.606	—
23	47	A. J. Allmendinger	JTG Daugherty Racing	Chevrolet	26.508	26.622	—
24	10	Danica Patrick	Stewart–Haas Racing	Ford	26.520	26.694	—
25	6	Trevor Bayne	Roush Fenway Racing	Ford	26.542	—	—
26	38	David Ragan	Front Row Motorsports	Ford	26.597	—	—
27	17	Ricky Stenhouse Jr.	Roush Fenway Racing	Ford	26.604	—	—
28	95	Michael McDowell	Leavine Family Racing	Chevrolet	26.609	—	—
29	13	Ty Dillon (R)	Germain Racing	Chevrolet	26.664	—	—
30	32	Matt DiBenedetto	Go Fas Racing	Ford	26.697	—	—
31	37	Chris Buescher	JTG Daugherty Racing	Chevrolet	26.727	—	—
32	34	Landon Cassill	Front Row Motorsports	Ford	26.762	—	—
33	23	Corey LaJoie (R)	BK Racing	Toyota	26.956	—	—
34	72	Cole Whitt	TriStar Motorsports	Chevrolet	26.957	—	—
35	7	Joey Gase (i)	Premium Motorsports	Chevrolet	26.970	—	—
36	66	David Starr (i)	MBM Motorsports	Toyota	27.158	—	—
37	15	D. J. Kennington	Premium Motorsports	Chevrolet	27.221	—	—
38	33	Jeffrey Earnhardt	Circle Sport – The Motorsports Group	Chevrolet	27.352	—	—
39	51	Kyle Weatherman	Rick Ware Racing	Chevrolet	28.337	—	—
40	00	Derrike Cope	StarCom Racing	Chevrolet	0.000	—	—
Official qualifying results

== Practice (post-qualifying) ==
=== Second practice ===
Kevin Harvick was the fastest in the second practice session with a time of 26.800 seconds and a speed of 134.328 mph (216.180 km/h).

Pos	No.	Driver	Team	Manufacturer	Time	Speed
1	4	Kevin Harvick	Stewart–Haas Racing	Ford	26.800	134.328
2	24	Chase Elliott	Hendrick Motorsports	Chevrolet	26.833	134.163
3	5	Kasey Kahne	Hendrick Motorsports	Chevrolet	26.849	134.083
Official second practice results

=== Final practice ===
Kevin Harvick was the fastest in the final practice session with a time of 26.672 seconds and a speed of 134.973 mph (217.218 km/h).

Pos	No.	Driver	Team	Manufacturer	Time	Speed
1	4	Kevin Harvick	Stewart–Haas Racing	Ford	26.672	134.973
2	18	Kyle Busch	Joe Gibbs Racing	Toyota	26.799	134.333
3	5	Kasey Kahne	Hendrick Motorsports	Chevrolet	26.800	134.328
Official final practice results

== Race ==
=== Stage 1 ===
==== Start ====
Ryan Blaney led the field to the green flag at 2:37 p.m., He led a total of 11 laps, Chase Elliott took the lead on lap 11 and led 14 laps, Denny Hamlin took the lead on lap 26 and led only one lap, Chase Elliott regained the lead on lap 27 and led only one lap, Hamlin regained the lead on lap 28 and led 40 laps. The first caution of the race flew on lap 77 for the conclusion of the first stage.

=== Stage 2 ===
The race restarted on lap 84 and it remained green for 67 laps.

=== Final stage ===
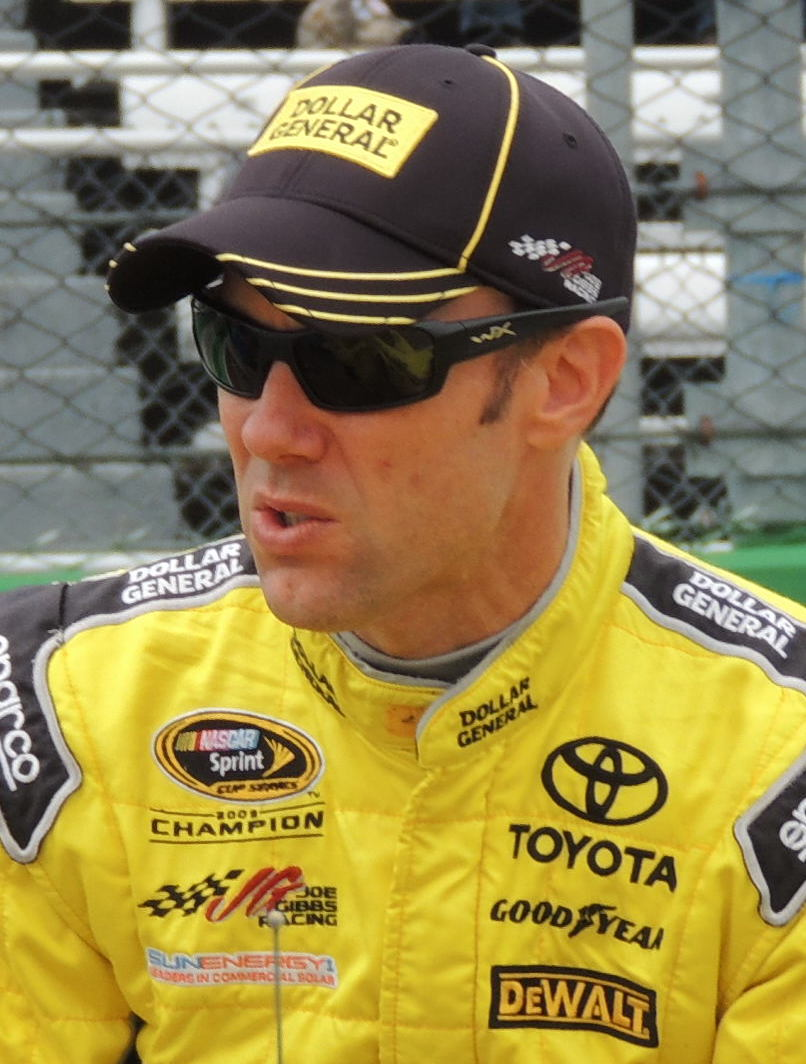
Matt Kenseth won the race.

The race restarted on lap 159 and it remained green for 71 laps. Denny Hamlin led on lap 228, with Matt Kenseth 2.5 seconds behind.

The race restarted on lap 236 and the fourth caution of the race flew on lap 239 for debris in turn 2, Dale Earnhardt Jr. won the free pass under caution.

The race restarted on lap 244 and it remained green for 9 laps.

The race restarted on lap 259 and the sixth caution of the race flew three laps later for a single-car wreck in turn 3 by Cole Whitt, Kasey Kahne won the free pass under caution.

The race restarted on lap 266 and it remained green for 10 laps, The seventh caution of the race flew on lap 276 for Hamlin cutting a tire down after a few laps earlier he and Elliott slammed into the wall.

The race restarted on lap 282, Elliott was aggressive to get the lead from Kenseth with 29 to go but Kenseth fought back and took the lead with 10 laps to go and drove on to score his first victory in 52 races since 2016 in New Hampshire. With Kenseth's win Brad Keselowski was the final driver to advance to the Championship Four.

== Post race ==
"I don't know what to say except thank the Lord," an emotional Kenseth said after climbing out of his car. "It's been an amazing journey. Just got one race left and everybody dreams of going out a winner. We won today. Nobody can take that away from us."

== Race results ==
=== Stage results ===
Stage 1 Laps: 75

Pos	No	Driver	Team	Manufacturer	Points
1	42	Kyle Larson	Chip Ganassi Racing	Chevrolet	10
2	11	Denny Hamlin	Joe Gibbs Racing	Toyota	9
3	24	Chase Elliott	Hendrick Motorsports	Chevrolet	8
4	20	Matt Kenseth	Joe Gibbs Racing	Toyota	7
5	4	Kevin Harvick	Stewart–Haas Racing	Ford	6
6	18	Kyle Busch	Joe Gibbs Racing	Toyota	5
7	77	Erik Jones (R)	Furniture Row Racing	Toyota	4
8	78	Martin Truex Jr.	Furniture Row Racing	Toyota	3
9	31	Ryan Newman	Richard Childress Racing	Chevrolet	2
10	48	Jimmie Johnson	Hendrick Motorsports	Chevrolet	1
Official stage one results

Stage 2 Laps: 75

Pos	No	Driver	Team	Manufacturer	Points
1	11	Denny Hamlin	Joe Gibbs Racing	Toyota	10
2	20	Matt Kenseth	Joe Gibbs Racing	Toyota	9
3	77	Erik Jones (R)	Furniture Row Racing	Toyota	8
4	78	Martin Truex Jr.	Furniture Row Racing	Toyota	7
5	18	Kyle Busch	Joe Gibbs Racing	Toyota	6
6	4	Kevin Harvick	Stewart–Haas Racing	Ford	5
7	1	Jamie McMurray	Chip Ganassi Racing	Chevrolet	4
8	31	Ryan Newman	Richard Childress Racing	Chevrolet	3
9	24	Chase Elliott	Hendrick Motorsports	Chevrolet	2
10	14	Clint Bowyer	Stewart–Haas Racing	Ford	1
Official stage two results

=== Final stage results ===
Stage 3 Laps: 162

Pos	No	Driver	Team	Manufacturer	Laps	Points
1	20	Matt Kenseth	Joe Gibbs Racing	Toyota	312	56
2	24	Chase Elliott	Hendrick Motorsports	Chevrolet	312	45
3	78	Martin Truex Jr.	Furniture Row Racing	Toyota	312	44
4	77	Erik Jones (R)	Furniture Row Racing	Toyota	312	45
5	4	Kevin Harvick	Stewart–Haas Racing	Ford	312	43
6	1	Jamie McMurray	Chip Ganassi Racing	Chevrolet	312	35
7	18	Kyle Busch	Joe Gibbs Racing	Toyota	312	41
8	17	Ricky Stenhouse Jr.	Roush Fenway Racing	Ford	312	29
9	43	Aric Almirola	Richard Petty Motorsports	Ford	312	28
10	88	Dale Earnhardt Jr.	Hendrick Motorsports	Chevrolet	312	27
11	13	Ty Dillon (R)	Germain Racing	Chevrolet	312	26
12	22	Joey Logano	Team Penske	Ford	312	25
13	14	Clint Bowyer	Stewart–Haas Racing	Ford	312	25
14	3	Austin Dillon	Richard Childress Racing	Chevrolet	312	23
15	27	Paul Menard	Richard Childress Racing	Chevrolet	312	22
16	2	Brad Keselowski	Team Penske	Ford	312	21
17	21	Ryan Blaney	Wood Brothers Racing	Ford	312	20
18	19	Daniel Suárez (R)	Joe Gibbs Racing	Toyota	312	19
19	5	Kasey Kahne	Hendrick Motorsports	Chevrolet	311	18
20	31	Ryan Newman	Richard Childress Racing	Chevrolet	311	22
21	41	Kurt Busch	Stewart–Haas Racing	Ford	310	16
22	95	Michael McDowell	Leavine Family Racing	Chevrolet	309	15
23	47	A. J. Allmendinger	JTG Daugherty Racing	Chevrolet	309	14
24	34	Landon Cassill	Front Row Motorsports	Ford	309	13
25	10	Danica Patrick	Stewart–Haas Racing	Ford	309	12
26	15	D. J. Kennington	Premium Motorsports	Chevrolet	307	11
27	32	Matt DiBenedetto	Go Fas Racing	Ford	306	10
28	66	David Starr (i)	MBM Motorsports	Toyota	305	0
29	33	Jeffrey Earnhardt	Circle Sport – The Motorsports Group	Chevrolet	305	8
30	7	Joey Gase (i)	Premium Motorsports	Chevrolet	304	0
31	23	Corey LaJoie (R)	BK Racing	Toyota	304	6
32	00	Derrike Cope	StarCom Racing	Chevrolet	302	5
33	38	David Ragan	Front Row Motorsports	Ford	301	4
34	51	Kyle Weatherman	Rick Ware Racing	Chevrolet	294	3
35	11	Denny Hamlin	Joe Gibbs Racing	Toyota	275	21
36	72	Cole Whitt	TriStar Motorsports	Chevrolet	258	1
37	37	Chris Buescher	JTG Daugherty Racing	Chevrolet	247	1
38	6	Trevor Bayne	Roush Fenway Racing	Ford	226	1
39	48	Jimmie Johnson	Hendrick Motorsports	Chevrolet	148	2
40	42	Kyle Larson	Chip Ganassi Racing	Chevrolet	104	11
Official race results

=== Race statistics ===
- Lead changes: 5 among different drivers
- Cautions/Laps: 7 for 41
- Red flags: 1 for 5 minutes and 3 seconds
- Time of race: 2 hours, 57 minutes, 23 seconds
- Average speed: 105.534 miles per hour (169.841 km/h)

== Media ==
=== Television ===
NBC covered the race on the television side. Rick Allen, two–time Phoenix winner Jeff Burton and Steve Letarte had the call in the booth for the race. Dave Burns, Parker Kligerman, Marty Snider and Kelli Stavast reported from pit lane during the race.

NBC
Booth announcers	Pit reporters
Lap-by-lap: Rick Allen; Color-commentator: Jeff Burton; Color-commentator: Steve Letarte	Dave Burns; Parker Kligerman; Marty Snider; Kelli Stavast

=== Radio ===
MRN had the radio call for the race, which was simulcast on Sirius XM NASCAR Radio.

MRN
Booth announcers	Turn announcers	Pit reporters
Lead announcer: Joe Moore; Announcer: Jeff Striegle; Announcer: Rusty Wallace	Turns 1 & 2: Kyle Rickey; Turns 3 & 4: Buddy Long	Alex Hayden; Winston Kelley; Steve Post

== Standings after the race ==
Drivers' Championship standings

	Pos	Driver	Points
2	1	Kevin Harvick	5,000
	2	Kyle Busch	5,000 (−0)
2	3	Martin Truex Jr.	5,000 (−0)
	4	Brad Keselowski	5,000 (−0)
2	5	Chase Elliott	2,338 (−2,662)
1	6	Denny Hamlin	2,321 (−2,679)
3	7	Matt Kenseth	2,311 (−2,689)
2	8	Ryan Blaney	2,297 (−2,703)
	9	Kyle Larson	2,266 (−2,734)
2	10	Jimmie Johnson	2,250 (−2,750)
3	11	Ricky Stenhouse Jr.	2,200 (−2,800)
3	12	Jamie McMurray	2,200 (−2,800)
	13	Austin Dillon	2,198 (−2,802)
2	14	Kasey Kahne	2,194 (−2,806)
4	15	Kurt Busch	2,193 (−2,807)
	16	Ryan Newman	2,169 (−2,831)
Official driver's standings

Manufacturers' Championship standings

Pos	Manufacturer	Points
1	Toyota	1,252
2	Ford	1,221 (−31)
3	Chevrolet	1,213 (−39)
Official manufacturers' standings

- Note: Only the first 16 positions are included for the driver standings.

Previous race: 2017 AAA Texas 500	Monster Energy NASCAR Cup Series; 2017 season	Next race: 2017 Ford EcoBoost 400
