= 2017 AAA Texas 500 =

Race details
- Race 34 of 36 in the 2017 Monster Energy NASCAR Cup Series
- The 2017 AAA Texas 500 program cover, featuring Dale Earnhardt Jr., featuring his first ever win. "It All Started Here."
- Date: November 5, 2017
- Location: Texas Motor Speedway in Fort Worth, Texas
- Course: Permanent racing facility
- Course length: 1.5 miles (2.4 km)
- Distance: 334 laps, 501 mi (801.6 km)
- Average speed: 143.234 miles per hour (230.513 km/h)

Pole position
Driver	Kurt Busch	Stewart–Haas Racing
- Time: 26.877

Most laps led
Driver	Martin Truex Jr.	Furniture Row Racing
- Laps: 107

Winner
No. 4	Kevin Harvick	Stewart–Haas Racing

Television in the United States
- Network: NBCSN
- Announcers: Rick Allen, Dale Jarrett, Jeff Burton and Steve Letarte

Radio in the United States
- Radio: PRN
- Booth announcers: Doug Rice, Mark Garrow and Wendy Venturini
- Turn announcers: Rob Albright (1 & 2) and Pat Patterson (3 & 4)

The 2017 AAA Texas 500 was a Monster Energy NASCAR Cup Series race which was held on November 5, 2017, at Texas Motor Speedway in Fort Worth, Texas. Contested over 334 laps on the 1.5 mile (2.4 km) intermediate quad-oval, it was the 34th race of the 2017 Monster Energy NASCAR Cup Series season, eighth race of the Playoffs, and second race of the Round of 8.

== Entry list ==
No.	Driver	Team	Manufacturer
1	Jamie McMurray	Chip Ganassi Racing	Chevrolet
2	Brad Keselowski	Team Penske	Ford
3	Austin Dillon	Richard Childress Racing	Chevrolet
4	Kevin Harvick	Stewart–Haas Racing	Ford
5	Kasey Kahne	Hendrick Motorsports	Chevrolet
6	Trevor Bayne	Roush Fenway Racing	Ford
7	Joey Gase (i)	Premium Motorsports	Chevrolet
10	Danica Patrick	Stewart–Haas Racing	Ford
11	Denny Hamlin	Joe Gibbs Racing	Toyota
13	Ty Dillon (R)	Germain Racing	Chevrolet
14	Clint Bowyer	Stewart–Haas Racing	Ford
15	Reed Sorenson	Premium Motorsports	Chevrolet
17	Ricky Stenhouse Jr.	Roush Fenway Racing	Ford
18	Kyle Busch	Joe Gibbs Racing	Toyota
19	Daniel Suárez (R)	Joe Gibbs Racing	Toyota
20	Matt Kenseth	Joe Gibbs Racing	Toyota
21	Ryan Blaney	Wood Brothers Racing	Ford
22	Joey Logano	Team Penske	Ford
23	Corey LaJoie (R)	BK Racing	Toyota
24	Chase Elliott	Hendrick Motorsports	Chevrolet
27	Paul Menard*	Richard Childress Racing	Chevrolet
31	Ryan Newman	Richard Childress Racing	Chevrolet
32	Matt DiBenedetto	Go Fas Racing	Ford
33	Jeffrey Earnhardt	Circle Sport – The Motorsports Group	Chevrolet
34	Landon Cassill	Front Row Motorsports	Ford
37	Chris Buescher	JTG Daugherty Racing	Chevrolet
38	David Ragan	Front Row Motorsports	Ford
41	Kurt Busch	Stewart–Haas Racing	Ford
42	Kyle Larson	Chip Ganassi Racing	Chevrolet
43	Aric Almirola	Richard Petty Motorsports	Ford
47	A. J. Allmendinger	JTG Daugherty Racing	Chevrolet
48	Jimmie Johnson	Hendrick Motorsports	Chevrolet
51	Ray Black Jr. (i)	Rick Ware Racing	Chevrolet
66	David Starr (i)	MBM Motorsports	Chevrolet
72	Cole Whitt	TriStar Motorsports	Chevrolet
77	Erik Jones (R)	Furniture Row Racing	Toyota
78	Martin Truex Jr.	Furniture Row Racing	Toyota
83	Gray Gaulding (R)	BK Racing	Toyota
88	Dale Earnhardt Jr.	Hendrick Motorsports	Chevrolet
95	Michael McDowell	Leavine Family Racing	Chevrolet
Official entry list

- Daniel Hemric filled in for Menard for Qualifying, First and Second Practices as Menard and his wife, Jennifer, welcomed their second child that week.

== First practice ==
Ryan Blaney was the fastest in the first practice session with a time of 27.009 seconds and a speed of 199.933 mph (321.761 km/h).

Pos	No.	Driver	Team	Manufacturer	Time	Speed
1	21	Ryan Blaney	Wood Brothers Racing	Ford	27.009	199.933
2	11	Denny Hamlin	Joe Gibbs Racing	Toyota	27.109	199.196
3	41	Kurt Busch	Stewart–Haas Racing	Ford	27.111	199.181
Official first practice results

== Qualifying ==
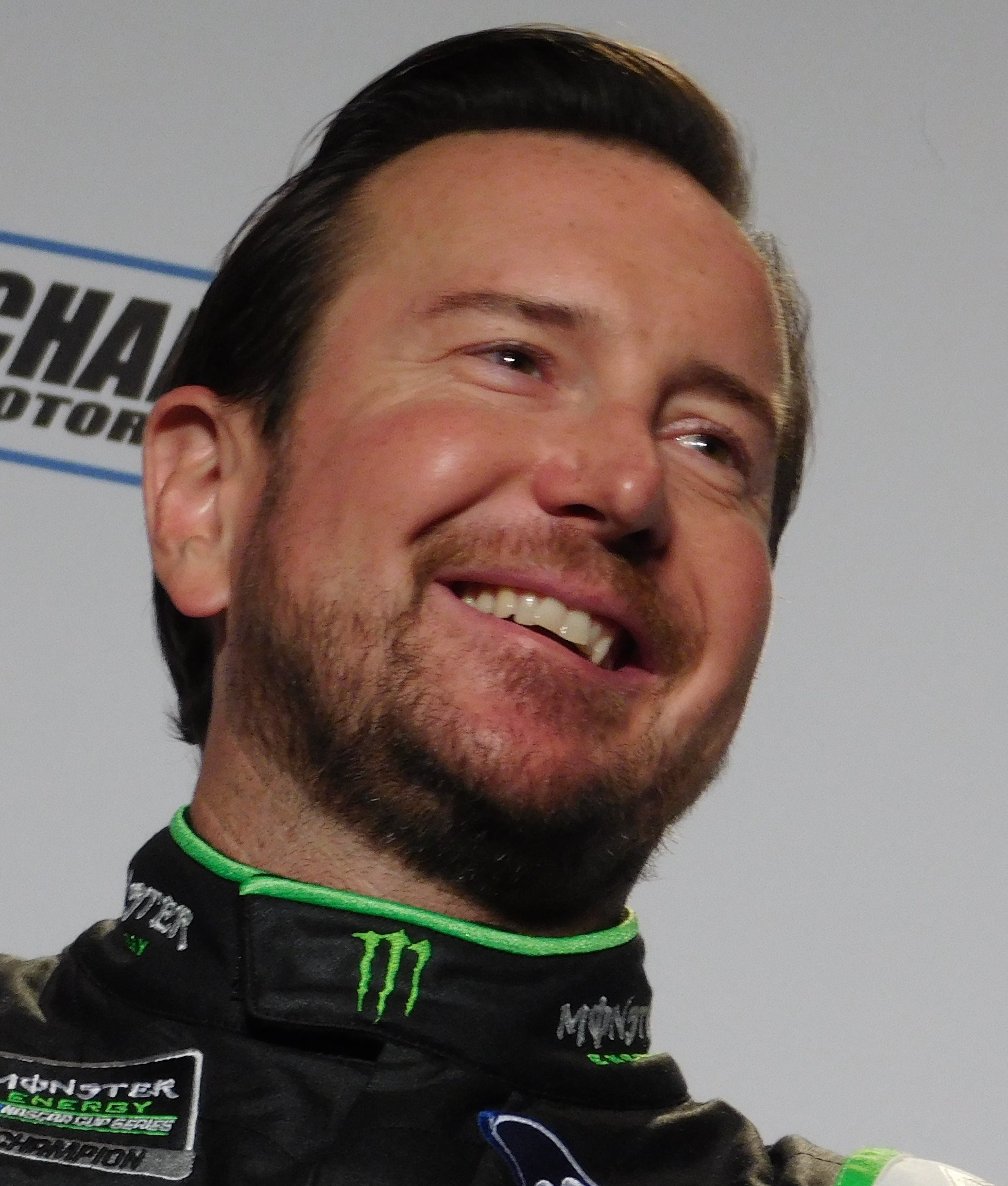
Kurt Busch won the pole position, setting a new track record.

Kurt Busch scored the pole for the race with a time of 26.877 and a speed of 200.915 mph (323.341 km/h).

=== Qualifying results ===
Pos	No.	Driver	Team	Manufacturer	R1	R2	R3
1	41	Kurt Busch	Stewart–Haas Racing	Ford	27.099	27.047	26.877
2	11	Denny Hamlin	Joe Gibbs Racing	Toyota	27.181	27.010	26.917
3	4	Kevin Harvick	Stewart–Haas Racing	Ford	27.016	27.015	26.949
4	77	Erik Jones (R)	Furniture Row Racing	Toyota	27.142	26.997	26.956
5	18	Kyle Busch	Joe Gibbs Racing	Toyota	27.221	27.090	26.966
6	19	Daniel Suárez (R)	Joe Gibbs Racing	Toyota	27.355	27.133	27.055
7	78	Martin Truex Jr.	Furniture Row Racing	Toyota	27.362	27.064	27.077
8	21	Ryan Blaney	Wood Brothers Racing	Ford	27.321	27.138	27.084
9	48	Jimmie Johnson	Hendrick Motorsports	Chevrolet	27.427	27.158	27.173
10	2	Brad Keselowski	Team Penske	Ford	27.164	27.159	27.207
11	42	Kyle Larson	Chip Ganassi Racing	Chevrolet	27.332	27.228	27.253
12	17	Ricky Stenhouse Jr.	Roush Fenway Racing	Ford	27.499	27.301	27.262
13	1	Jamie McMurray	Chip Ganassi Racing	Chevrolet	27.451	27.315	—
14	10	Danica Patrick	Stewart–Haas Racing	Ford	27.547	27.322	—
15	3	Austin Dillon	Richard Childress Racing	Chevrolet	27.497	27.337	—
16	47	A. J. Allmendinger	JTG Daugherty Racing	Chevrolet	27.403	27.346	—
17	88	Dale Earnhardt Jr.	Hendrick Motorsports	Chevrolet	27.460	27.350	—
18	43	Aric Almirola	Richard Petty Motorsports	Ford	27.521	27.374	—
19	5	Kasey Kahne	Hendrick Motorsports	Chevrolet	27.474	27.397	—
20	14	Clint Bowyer	Stewart–Haas Racing	Ford	27.598	27.477	—
21	27	Daniel Hemric (i)	Richard Childress Racing	Chevrolet	27.554	27.520	—
22	34	Landon Cassill	Front Row Motorsports	Ford	27.644	27.601	—
23	95	Michael McDowell	Leavine Family Racing	Chevrolet	27.643	27.807	—
24	38	David Ragan	Front Row Motorsports	Ford	27.509	27.810	—
25	31	Ryan Newman	Richard Childress Racing	Chevrolet	27.671	—	—
26	37	Chris Buescher	JTG Daugherty Racing	Chevrolet	27.725	—	—
27	13	Ty Dillon (R)	Germain Racing	Chevrolet	27.846	—	—
28	32	Matt DiBenedetto	Go Fas Racing	Ford	27.849	—	—
29	72	Cole Whitt	TriStar Motorsports	Chevrolet	28.143	—	—
30	7	Joey Gase (i)	Premium Motorsports	Chevrolet	28.717	—	—
31	51	Ray Black Jr. (i)	Rick Ware Racing	Chevrolet	28.861	—	—
32	33	Jeffrey Earnhardt	Circle Sport – The Motorsports Group	Chevrolet	28.876	—	—
33	66	David Starr (i)	MBM Motorsports	Chevrolet	29.704	—	—
34	24	Chase Elliott	Hendrick Motorsports	Chevrolet	0.000	—	—
35	20	Matt Kenseth	Joe Gibbs Racing	Toyota	0.000	—	—
36	22	Joey Logano	Team Penske	Ford	0.000	—	—
37	6	Trevor Bayne	Roush Fenway Racing	Ford	0.000	—	—
38	15	Reed Sorenson	Premium Motorsports	Chevrolet	0.000	—	—
39	23	Corey LaJoie (R)	BK Racing	Toyota	0.000	—	—
40	83	Gray Gaulding (R)	BK Racing	Toyota	0.000	—	—
Official qualifying results

== Practice (post-qualifying) ==
=== Second practice ===
Kurt Busch was the fastest in the second practice session with a time of 28.159 seconds and a speed of 191.768 mph (308.621 km/h).

Pos	No.	Driver	Team	Manufacturer	Time	Speed
1	41	Kurt Busch	Stewart–Haas Racing	Ford	28.159	191.768
2	11	Denny Hamlin	Joe Gibbs Racing	Toyota	28.256	191.110
3	77	Erik Jones (R)	Furniture Row Racing	Toyota	28.262	191.069
Official second practice results

=== Final practice ===
Denny Hamlin was the fastest in the final practice session with a time of 28.203 seconds and a speed of 191.469 mph (308.139 km/h).

Pos	No.	Driver	Team	Manufacturer	Time	Speed
1	11	Denny Hamlin	Joe Gibbs Racing	Toyota	28.203	191.469
2	77	Erik Jones (R)	Furniture Row Racing	Toyota	28.293	190.860
3	21	Ryan Blaney	Wood Brothers Racing	Ford	28.318	190.691
Official final practice results

== Race ==
=== Race results ===
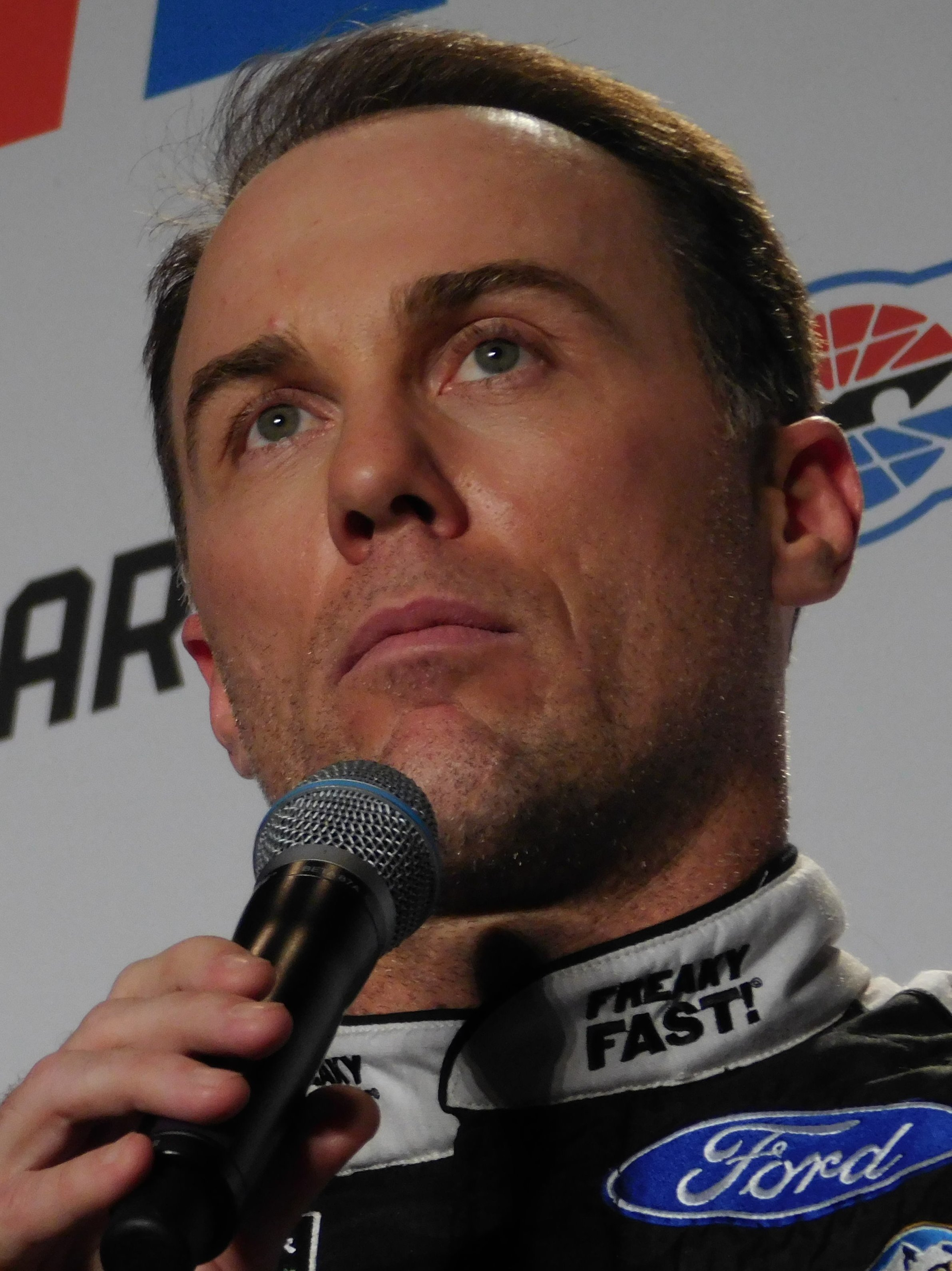
Kevin Harvick won the race.

==== Stage results ====
Stage 1 Laps: 85

Pos	No	Driver	Team	Manufacturer	Points
1	4	Kevin Harvick	Stewart–Haas Racing	Ford	10
2	78	Martin Truex Jr.	Furniture Row Racing	Toyota	9
3	11	Denny Hamlin	Joe Gibbs Racing	Toyota	8
4	42	Kyle Larson	Chip Ganassi Racing	Chevrolet	7
5	41	Kurt Busch	Stewart–Haas Racing	Ford	6
6	77	Erik Jones (R)	Furniture Row Racing	Toyota	5
7	20	Matt Kenseth	Joe Gibbs Racing	Toyota	4
8	21	Ryan Blaney	Wood Brothers Racing	Ford	3
9	3	Austin Dillon	Richard Childress Racing	Chevrolet	2
10	19	Daniel Suárez (R)	Joe Gibbs Racing	Toyota	1
Official stage one results

Stage 2 Laps: 85

Pos	No	Driver	Team	Manufacturer	Points
1	42	Kyle Larson	Chip Ganassi Racing	Chevrolet	10
2	4	Kevin Harvick	Stewart–Haas Racing	Ford	9
3	21	Ryan Blaney	Wood Brothers Racing	Ford	8
4	78	Martin Truex Jr.	Furniture Row Racing	Toyota	7
5	24	Chase Elliott	Hendrick Motorsports	Chevrolet	6
6	11	Denny Hamlin	Joe Gibbs Racing	Toyota	5
7	41	Kurt Busch	Stewart–Haas Racing	Ford	4
8	20	Matt Kenseth	Joe Gibbs Racing	Toyota	3
9	77	Erik Jones (R)	Furniture Row Racing	Toyota	2
10	3	Austin Dillon	Richard Childress Racing	Chevrolet	1
Official stage two results

=== Final stage results ===
Stage 3 Laps: 164

Pos	Grid	No	Driver	Team	Manufacturer	Laps	Points
1	3	4	Kevin Harvick	Stewart–Haas Racing	Ford	334	59
2	7	78	Martin Truex Jr.	Furniture Row Racing	Toyota	334	51
3	2	11	Denny Hamlin	Joe Gibbs Racing	Toyota	334	47
4	35	20	Matt Kenseth	Joe Gibbs Racing	Toyota	334	40
5	10	2	Brad Keselowski	Team Penske	Ford	334	32
6	8	21	Ryan Blaney	Wood Brothers Racing	Ford	334	42
7	36	22	Joey Logano	Team Penske	Ford	334	30
8	34	24	Chase Elliott	Hendrick Motorsports	Chevrolet	334	35
9	1	41	Kurt Busch	Stewart–Haas Racing	Ford	334	38
10	4	77	Erik Jones (R)	Furniture Row Racing	Toyota	334	34
11	19	5	Kasey Kahne	Hendrick Motorsports	Chevrolet	334	26
12	12	17	Ricky Stenhouse Jr.	Roush Fenway Racing	Ford	334	25
13	15	3	Austin Dillon	Richard Childress Racing	Chevrolet	334	27
14	6	19	Daniel Suárez (R)	Joe Gibbs Racing	Toyota	334	24
15	18	43	Aric Almirola	Richard Petty Motorsports	Ford	334	22
16	16	47	A. J. Allmendinger	JTG Daugherty Racing	Chevrolet	334	21
17	14	10	Danica Patrick	Stewart–Haas Racing	Ford	333	20
18	13	1	Jamie McMurray	Chip Ganassi Racing	Chevrolet	333	19
19	5	18	Kyle Busch	Joe Gibbs Racing	Toyota	333	18
20	25	31	Ryan Newman	Richard Childress Racing	Chevrolet	333	17
21	23	95	Michael McDowell	Leavine Family Racing	Chevrolet	333	16
22	26	37	Chris Buescher	JTG Daugherty Racing	Chevrolet	333	15
23	21	27	Paul Menard	Richard Childress Racing	Chevrolet	332	14
24	27	13	Ty Dillon (R)	Germain Racing	Chevrolet	332	13
25	28	32	Matt DiBenedetto	Go Fas Racing	Ford	332	12
26	22	34	Landon Cassill	Front Row Motorsports	Ford	331	11
27	9	48	Jimmie Johnson	Hendrick Motorsports	Chevrolet	331	10
28	37	6	Trevor Bayne	Roush Fenway Racing	Ford	330	9
29	29	72	Cole Whitt	TriStar Motorsports	Chevrolet	330	8
30	24	38	David Ragan	Front Row Motorsports	Ford	329	7
31	38	15	Reed Sorenson	Premium Motorsports	Chevrolet	325	6
32	30	7	Joey Gase (i)	Premium Motorsports	Chevrolet	322	0
33	32	33	Jeffrey Earnhardt	Circle Sport – The Motorsports Group	Chevrolet	322	4
34	31	51	Ray Black Jr. (i)	Rick Ware Racing	Chevrolet	305	0
35	17	88	Dale Earnhardt Jr.	Hendrick Motorsports	Chevrolet	304	2
36	20	14	Clint Bowyer	Stewart–Haas Racing	Ford	303	1
37	11	42	Kyle Larson	Chip Ganassi Racing	Chevrolet	282	18
38	33	66	David Starr (i)	MBM Motorsports	Chevrolet	237	0
39	39	23	Corey LaJoie (R)	BK Racing	Toyota	227	1
40	40	83	Gray Gaulding (R)	BK Racing	Toyota	159	1
Official race results

=== Race statistics ===
- Lead changes: 13 among different drivers
- Cautions/Laps: 8 for 40
- Red flags: 1 for 10 minutes and 29 seconds
- Time of race: 3 hours, 29 minutes, 52 seconds
- Average speed: 143.234 miles per hour (230.513 km/h)

== Media ==
=== Television ===
NBCSN covered the race on the television side. Rick Allen and Dale Jarrett had the call in the regular booth for the race. Two–time Texas winner Jeff Burton and Steve Letarte had the call in the NBC's Stock Car Smarts Booth for the race. Dave Burns, Marty Snider and Kelli Stavast reported from pit lane during the race.

NBCSN
Booth announcers	Pit reporters
Lap-by-lap: Rick Allen; Color Commentator Dale Jarrett; Stock Car Smarts Booth Analyst: Jeff Burton; Stock Car Smarts Booth Analyst: Steve Letarte	Dave Burns; Marty Snider; Kelli Stavast

=== Radio ===
PRN had the radio call for the race, which was simulcast on Sirius XM NASCAR Radio.

PRN
Booth announcers	Turn announcers	Pit reporters
Lead announcer: Doug Rice; Announcer: Mark Garrow; Announcer: Wendy Venturini	Turns 1 & 2: Rob Albright; Turns 3 & 4: Pat Patterson	Brad Gillie; Brett McMillan; Jim Noble; Steve Richards

== Standings after the race ==
Drivers' Championship standings

	Pos	Driver	Points
	1	Martin Truex Jr.	4,168
	2	Kyle Busch	4,118 (−50)
1	3	Kevin Harvick	4,112 (−56)
1	4	Brad Keselowski	4,111 (−57)
2	5	Denny Hamlin	4,092 (−76)
	6	Ryan Blaney	4,089 (−79)
1	7	Chase Elliott	4,062 (−106)
3	8	Jimmie Johnson	4,060 (−108)
	9	Kyle Larson	2,255 (−1,913)
	10	Matt Kenseth	2,255 (−1,913)
4	11	Kurt Busch	2,177 (−1,991)
1	12	Kasey Kahne	2,176 (−1,992)
1	13	Austin Dillon	2,175 (−1,993)
1	14	Ricky Stenhouse Jr.	2,171 (−1,997)
1	15	Jamie McMurray	2,165 (−2,003)
	16	Ryan Newman	2,147 (−2,021)
Official driver's standings

Manufacturers' Championship standings

Pos	Manufacturer	Points
1	Toyota	1,212
2	Ford	1,189 (−23)
3	Chevrolet	1,178 (−34)
Official manufacturers' standings

- Note: Only the first 16 positions are included for the driver standings.

Previous race: 2017 First Data 500	Monster Energy NASCAR Cup Series; 2017 season	Next race: 2017 Can-Am 500
