= 2017 Bass Pro Shops NRA Night Race =

Race details
- Race 24 of 36 in the 2017 Monster Energy NASCAR Cup Series
- The 2017 Bass Pro Shops NRA Night Race program cover, with artwork by former NASCAR artist Sam Bass. The cover features a tribute to the Earnhardt family. The painting is called “Leave A Mark!”
- Date: August 19, 2017
- Location: Bristol Motor Speedway in Bristol, Tennessee
- Course: Permanent racing facility
- Course length: .533 miles (.858 km)
- Distance: 500 laps, 266.5 mi (429 km)
- Average speed: 95.969 miles per hour (154.447 km/h)

Pole position
Driver	Erik Jones	Furniture Row Racing
- Time: 14.981

Most laps led
Driver	Erik Jones	Furniture Row Racing
- Laps: 260

Winner
No. 18	Kyle Busch	Joe Gibbs Racing

Television in the United States
- Network: NBC
- Announcers: Rick Allen, Jeff Burton and Steve Letarte

Radio in the United States
- Radio: PRN
- Booth announcers: Doug Rice, Mark Garrow and Wendy Venturini
- Turn announcers: Rob Albright (Backstretch)

The 2017 Bass Pro Shops NRA Night Race, was a Monster Energy NASCAR Cup Series race held on August 19, 2017 at Bristol Motor Speedway in Bristol, Tennessee. Contested over 500 laps on the .533-mile (0.858 km) short track, it was the 24th race of the 2017 Monster Energy NASCAR Cup Series season.

== Entry list ==
No.	Driver	Team	Manufacturer
1	Jamie McMurray	Chip Ganassi Racing	Chevrolet
2	Brad Keselowski	Team Penske	Ford
3	Austin Dillon	Richard Childress Racing	Chevrolet
4	Kevin Harvick	Stewart–Haas Racing	Ford
5	Kasey Kahne	Hendrick Motorsports	Chevrolet
6	Trevor Bayne	Roush Fenway Racing	Ford
7	J. J. Yeley (i)	Tommy Baldwin Racing	Chevrolet
10	Danica Patrick	Stewart–Haas Racing	Ford
11	Denny Hamlin	Joe Gibbs Racing	Toyota
13	Ty Dillon (R)	Germain Racing	Chevrolet
14	Clint Bowyer	Stewart–Haas Racing	Ford
15	Reed Sorenson	Premium Motorsports	Chevrolet
17	Ricky Stenhouse Jr.	Roush Fenway Racing	Ford
18	Kyle Busch	Joe Gibbs Racing	Toyota
19	Daniel Suárez (R)	Joe Gibbs Racing	Toyota
20	Matt Kenseth	Joe Gibbs Racing	Toyota
21	Ryan Blaney	Wood Brothers Racing	Ford
22	Joey Logano	Team Penske	Ford
23	Joey Gase (i)	BK Racing	Toyota
24	Chase Elliott	Hendrick Motorsports	Chevrolet
27	Paul Menard	Richard Childress Racing	Chevrolet
31	Ryan Newman	Richard Childress Racing	Chevrolet
32	Matt DiBenedetto	Go Fas Racing	Ford
33	Jeffrey Earnhardt	Circle Sport – The Motorsports Group	Chevrolet
34	Landon Cassill	Front Row Motorsports	Ford
37	Chris Buescher	JTG Daugherty Racing	Chevrolet
38	David Ragan	Front Row Motorsports	Ford
41	Kurt Busch	Stewart–Haas Racing	Ford
42	Kyle Larson	Chip Ganassi Racing	Chevrolet
43	Aric Almirola	Richard Petty Motorsports	Ford
47	A. J. Allmendinger	JTG Daugherty Racing	Chevrolet
48	Jimmie Johnson	Hendrick Motorsports	Chevrolet
51	B. J. McLeod (i)	Rick Ware Racing	Chevrolet
55	Gray Gaulding (R)	Premium Motorsports	Chevrolet
66	Timmy Hill (i)	MBM Motorsports	Chevrolet
72	Cole Whitt	TriStar Motorsports	Chevrolet
77	Erik Jones (R)	Furniture Row Racing	Toyota
78	Martin Truex Jr.	Furniture Row Racing	Toyota
83	Corey LaJoie (R)	BK Racing	Toyota
88	Dale Earnhardt Jr.	Hendrick Motorsports	Chevrolet
95	Michael McDowell	Leavine Family Racing	Chevrolet
Official entry list

== Practice ==
=== First practice ===
Denny Hamlin was the fastest in the first practice session with a time of 14.848 seconds and a speed of 129.230 mph (207.976 km/h).

Pos	No.	Driver	Team	Manufacturer	Time	Speed
1	11	Denny Hamlin	Joe Gibbs Racing	Toyota	14.848	129.230
2	18	Kyle Busch	Joe Gibbs Racing	Toyota	14.849	129.221
3	5	Kasey Kahne	Hendrick Motorsports	Chevrolet	14.881	128.943
Official first practice results

=== Final practice ===
Ryan Blaney was the fastest in the final practice session with a time of 14.926 seconds and a speed of 128.554 mph (206.888 km/h).

Pos	No.	Driver	Team	Manufacturer	Time	Speed
1	21	Ryan Blaney	Wood Brothers Racing	Ford	14.926	128.554
2	42	Kyle Larson	Chip Ganassi Racing	Chevrolet	14.983	128.065
3	31	Ryan Newman	Richard Childress Racing	Chevrolet	15.016	127.784
Official final practice results

== Qualifying ==
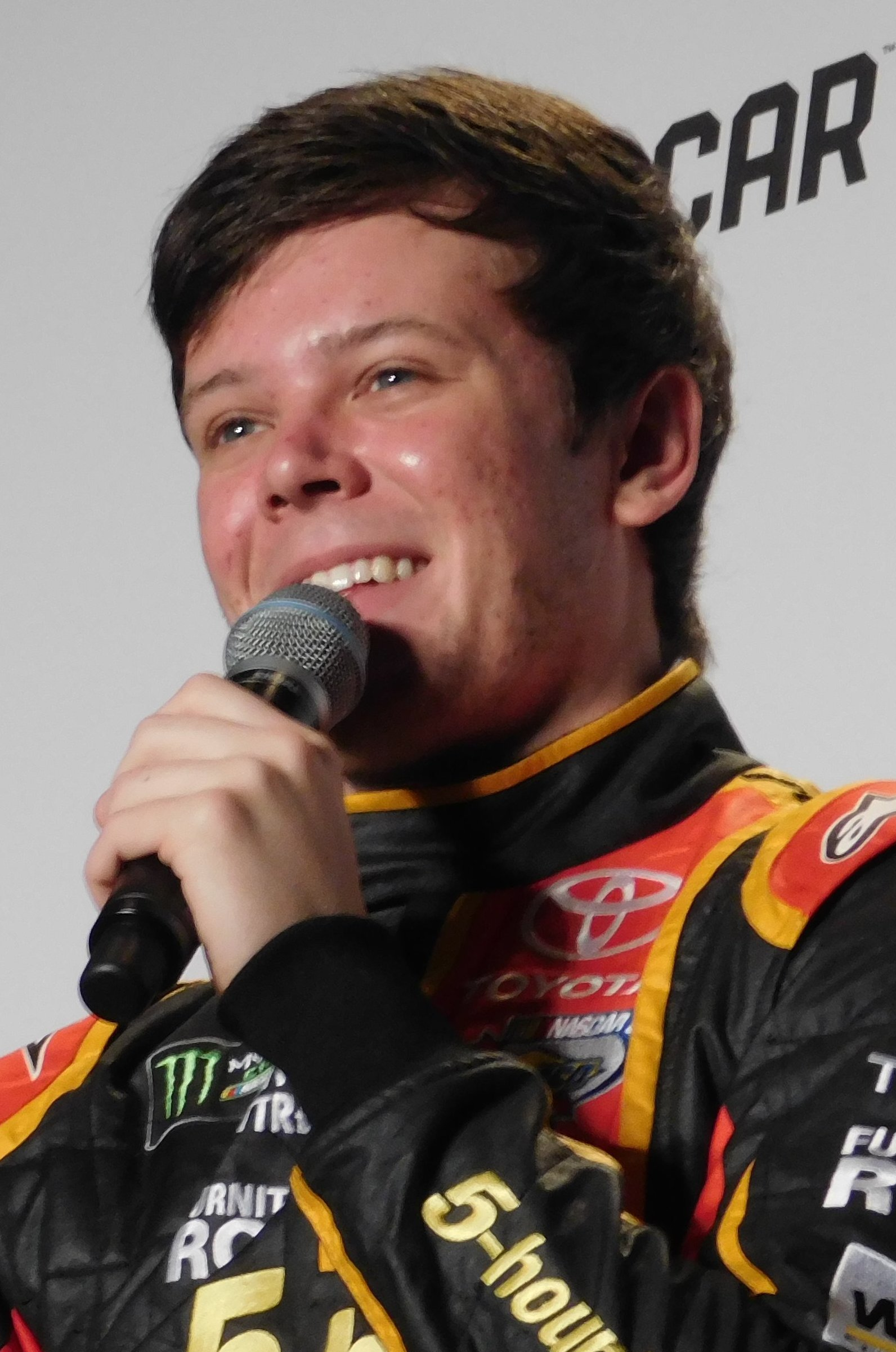
Erik Jones scored the pole position.

Erik Jones scored the pole for the race with a time of 14.981 and a speed of 128.082 mph (206.128 km/h).

=== Qualifying results ===
Pos	No.	Driver	Team	Manufacturer	R1	R2	R3
1	77	Erik Jones (R)	Furniture Row Racing	Toyota	14.959	14.980	14.981
2	42	Kyle Larson	Chip Ganassi Racing	Chevrolet	15.028	15.025	14.984
3	5	Kasey Kahne	Hendrick Motorsports	Chevrolet	14.970	15.059	15.005
4	24	Chase Elliott	Hendrick Motorsports	Chevrolet	14.888	15.007	15.031
5	20	Matt Kenseth	Joe Gibbs Racing	Toyota	14.966	14.940	15.042
6	78	Martin Truex Jr.	Furniture Row Racing	Toyota	14.954	15.082	15.046
7	11	Denny Hamlin	Joe Gibbs Racing	Toyota	14.850	14.917	15.062
8	22	Joey Logano	Team Penske	Ford	15.018	14.982	15.108
9	14	Clint Bowyer	Stewart–Haas Racing	Ford	15.135	15.023	15.117
10	21	Ryan Blaney	Wood Brothers Racing	Ford	14.974	15.019	15.126
11	1	Jamie McMurray	Chip Ganassi Racing	Chevrolet	14.919	15.053	15.225
12	19	Daniel Suárez (R)	Joe Gibbs Racing	Toyota	15.000	15.001	15.244
13	31	Ryan Newman	Richard Childress Racing	Chevrolet	15.049	15.100	—
14	17	Ricky Stenhouse Jr.	Roush Fenway Racing	Ford	15.010	15.108	—
15	37	Chris Buescher	JTG Daugherty Racing	Chevrolet	15.147	15.120	—
16	3	Austin Dillon	Richard Childress Racing	Chevrolet	15.137	15.121	—
17	2	Brad Keselowski	Team Penske	Ford	15.010	15.133	—
18	18	Kyle Busch	Joe Gibbs Racing	Toyota	14.769	15.143	—
19	38	David Ragan	Front Row Motorsports	Ford	15.180	15.146	—
20	6	Trevor Bayne	Roush Fenway Racing	Ford	15.079	15.179	—
21	48	Jimmie Johnson	Hendrick Motorsports	Chevrolet	15.137	15.181	—
22	13	Ty Dillon (R)	Germain Racing	Chevrolet	15.092	15.230	—
23	47	A. J. Allmendinger	JTG Daugherty Racing	Chevrolet	15.156	15.337	—
24	10	Danica Patrick	Stewart–Haas Racing	Ford	15.183	15.403	—
25	41	Kurt Busch	Stewart–Haas Racing	Ford	15.194	—	—
26	95	Michael McDowell	Leavine Family Racing	Chevrolet	15.212	—	—
27	27	Paul Menard	Richard Childress Racing	Chevrolet	15.255	—	—
28	43	Aric Almirola	Richard Petty Motorsports	Ford	15.255	—	—
29	4	Kevin Harvick	Stewart–Haas Racing	Ford	15.259	—	—
30	7	J. J. Yeley (i)	Tommy Baldwin Racing	Chevrolet	15.282	—	—
31	88	Dale Earnhardt Jr.	Hendrick Motorsports	Chevrolet	15.287	—	—
32	72	Cole Whitt	TriStar Motorsports	Chevrolet	15.329	—	—
33	34	Landon Cassill	Front Row Motorsports	Ford	15.376	—	—
34	32	Matt DiBenedetto	Go Fas Racing	Ford	15.406	—	—
35	83	Corey LaJoie (R)	BK Racing	Toyota	15.453	—	—
36	51	B. J. McLeod (i)	Rick Ware Racing	Chevrolet	15.503	—	—
37	55	Gray Gaulding (R)	Premium Motorsports	Chevrolet	15.531	—	—
38	33	Jeffrey Earnhardt	Circle Sport – The Motorsports Group	Chevrolet	15.554	—	—
39	15	Reed Sorenson	Premium Motorsports	Chevrolet	15.623	—	—
40	23	Joey Gase (R)	BK Racing	Toyota	15.777	—	—
Did not qualify
41	66	Timmy Hill (i)	MBM Motorsports	Chevrolet	15.725	—	—
Official qualifying results

== Race ==
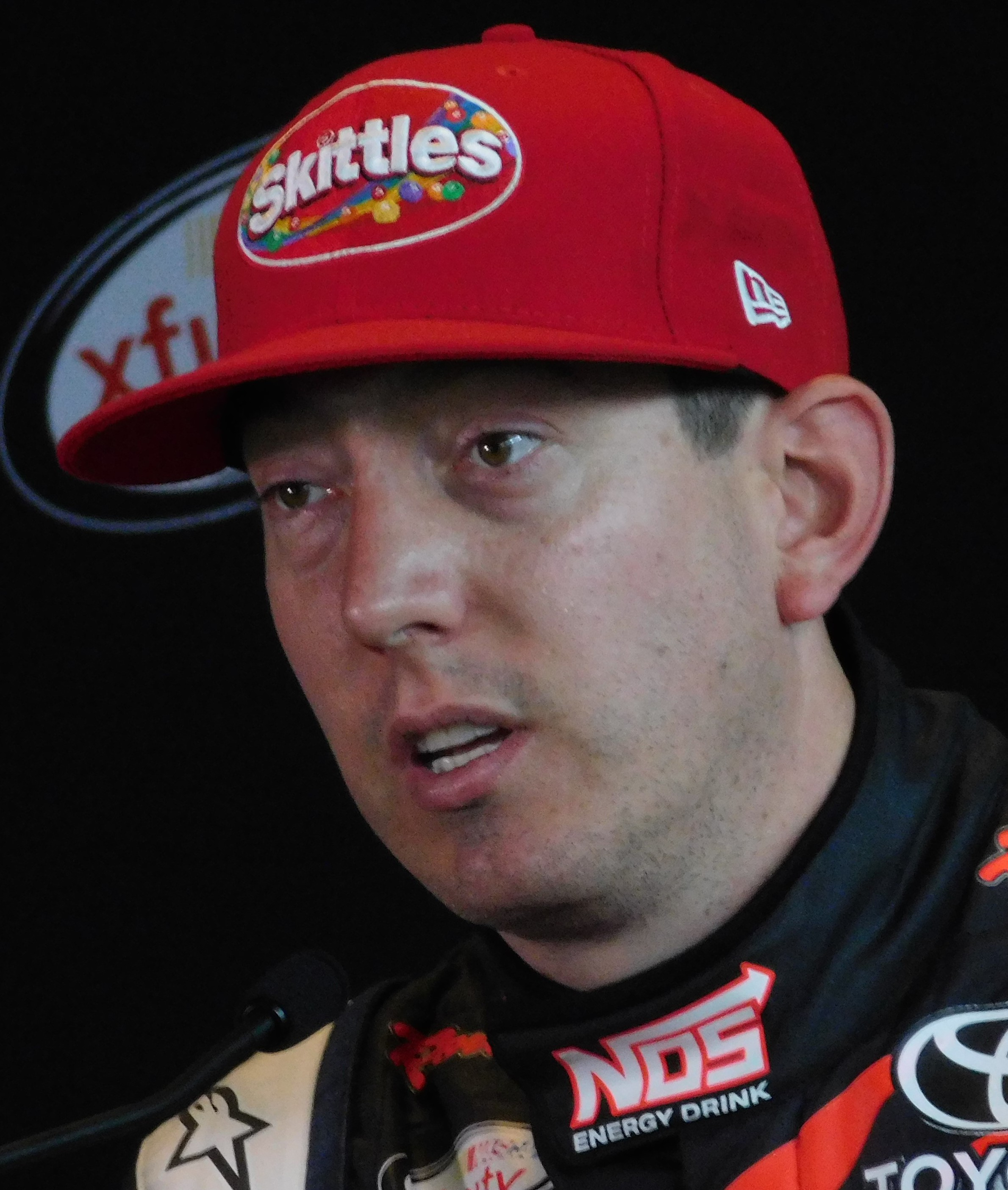
Kyle Busch won the race.

=== Race results ===
==== Stage results ====
Stage 1 Laps: 125

Pos	No	Driver	Team	Manufacturer	Points
1	18	Kyle Busch	Joe Gibbs Racing	Toyota	10
2	77	Erik Jones (R)	Furniture Row Racing	Toyota	9
3	42	Kyle Larson	Chip Ganassi Racing	Chevrolet	8
4	24	Chase Elliott	Hendrick Motorsports	Chevrolet	7
5	20	Matt Kenseth	Joe Gibbs Racing	Toyota	6
6	11	Denny Hamlin	Joe Gibbs Racing	Toyota	5
7	21	Ryan Blaney	Wood Brothers Racing	Ford	4
8	22	Joey Logano	Team Penske	Ford	3
9	78	Martin Truex Jr.	Furniture Row Racing	Toyota	2
10	48	Jimmie Johnson	Hendrick Motorsports	Chevrolet	1
Official stage one results

Stage 2 Laps: 125

Pos	No	Driver	Team	Manufacturer	Points
1	20	Matt Kenseth	Joe Gibbs Racing	Toyota	10
2	48	Jimmie Johnson	Hendrick Motorsports	Chevrolet	9
3	4	Kevin Harvick	Stewart–Haas Racing	Ford	8
4	31	Ryan Newman	Richard Childress Racing	Chevrolet	7
5	77	Erik Jones (R)	Furniture Row Racing	Toyota	6
6	42	Kyle Larson	Chip Ganassi Racing	Chevrolet	5
7	11	Denny Hamlin	Joe Gibbs Racing	Toyota	4
8	18	Kyle Busch	Joe Gibbs Racing	Toyota	3
9	27	Paul Menard	Richard Childress Racing	Chevrolet	2
10	14	Clint Bowyer	Stewart–Haas Racing	Ford	1
Official stage two results

=== Final stage results ===
Stage 3 Laps: 250

Pos	Grid	No	Driver	Team	Manufacturer	Laps	Points
1	18	18	Kyle Busch	Joe Gibbs Racing	Toyota	500	53
2	1	77	Erik Jones (R)	Furniture Row Racing	Toyota	500	50
3	7	11	Denny Hamlin	Joe Gibbs Racing	Toyota	500	43
4	5	20	Matt Kenseth	Joe Gibbs Racing	Toyota	500	49
5	25	41	Kurt Busch	Stewart–Haas Racing	Ford	500	32
6	13	31	Ryan Newman	Richard Childress Racing	Chevrolet	500	38
7	20	6	Trevor Bayne	Roush Fenway Racing	Ford	500	30
8	29	4	Kevin Harvick	Stewart–Haas Racing	Ford	500	37
9	2	42	Kyle Larson	Chip Ganassi Racing	Chevrolet	500	41
10	10	21	Ryan Blaney	Wood Brothers Racing	Ford	500	31
11	21	48	Jimmie Johnson	Hendrick Motorsports	Chevrolet	500	36
12	11	1	Jamie McMurray	Chip Ganassi Racing	Chevrolet	500	25
13	8	22	Joey Logano	Team Penske	Ford	500	27
14	14	17	Ricky Stenhouse Jr.	Roush Fenway Racing	Ford	500	23
15	12	19	Daniel Suárez (R)	Joe Gibbs Racing	Toyota	500	22
16	27	27	Paul Menard	Richard Childress Racing	Chevrolet	499	23
17	19	38	David Ragan	Front Row Motorsports	Ford	499	20
18	4	24	Chase Elliott	Hendrick Motorsports	Chevrolet	499	26
19	9	14	Clint Bowyer	Stewart–Haas Racing	Ford	499	19
20	26	95	Michael McDowell	Leavine Family Racing	Chevrolet	499	17
21	6	78	Martin Truex Jr.	Furniture Row Racing	Toyota	499	18
22	23	47	A. J. Allmendinger	JTG Daugherty Racing	Chevrolet	498	15
23	31	88	Dale Earnhardt Jr.	Hendrick Motorsports	Chevrolet	497	14
24	3	5	Kasey Kahne	Hendrick Motorsports	Chevrolet	497	13
25	24	10	Danica Patrick	Stewart–Haas Racing	Ford	496	12
26	34	32	Matt DiBenedetto	Go Fas Racing	Ford	496	11
27	15	37	Chris Buescher	JTG Daugherty Racing	Chevrolet	496	10
28	35	83	Corey LaJoie (R)	BK Racing	Toyota	495	9
29	17	2	Brad Keselowski	Team Penske	Ford	493	8
30	30	7	J. J. Yeley (i)	Tommy Baldwin Racing	Chevrolet	493	0
31	37	55	Gray Gaulding (R)	Premium Motorsports	Chevrolet	488	6
32	36	51	B. J. McLeod (i)	Rick Ware Racing	Chevrolet	482	0
33	32	72	Cole Whitt	TriStar Motorsports	Chevrolet	480	4
34	40	23	Joey Gase (i)	BK Racing	Toyota	476	0
35	33	34	Landon Cassill	Front Row Motorsports	Ford	412	2
36	22	13	Ty Dillon (R)	Germain Racing	Chevrolet	394	1
37	28	43	Aric Almirola	Richard Petty Motorsports	Ford	390	1
38	39	15	Reed Sorenson	Premium Motorsports	Chevrolet	352	1
39	16	3	Austin Dillon	Richard Childress Racing	Chevrolet	230	1
40	38	33	Jeffrey Earnhardt	Circle Sport – The Motorsports Group	Chevrolet	225	1
Official race results

=== Race statistics ===
- Lead changes: 6 among different drivers
- Cautions/Laps: 8 for 53
- Red flags: 0
- Time of race: 2 hours, 46 minutes and 37 seconds
- Average speed: 95.969 miles per hour (154.447 km/h)

== Media ==
=== Television ===
NBC Sports covered the race on the television side. Rick Allen, 2008 race winner Jeff Burton and Steve Letarte had the call in the booth for the race. Dave Burns, Parker Kligerman, Marty Snider and Kelli Stavast reported from pit lane during the race.

NBC
Booth announcers	Pit reporters
Lap-by-lap: Rick Allen; Color-commentator: Jeff Burton; Color-commentator: Steve Letarte	Dave Burns; Parker Kligerman; Marty Snider; Kelli Stavast

=== Radio ===
The Performance Racing Network had the radio call for the race, which was simulcast on Sirius XM NASCAR Radio.

PRN
Booth announcers	Turn announcers	Pit reporters
Lead announcer: Doug Rice; Announcer: Mark Garrow; Announcer: Wendy Venturini	Backstretch: Rob Albright	Brad Gillie; Brett McMillan; Jim Noble; Steve Richards

== Standings after the race ==
Drivers' Championship standings

	Pos	Driver	Points
	1	Martin Truex Jr.	951
1	2	Kyle Busch	850 (–101)
1	3	Kyle Larson	845 (–106)
	4	Kevin Harvick	824 (–127)
1	5	Denny Hamlin	753 (–198)
1	6	Brad Keselowski	728 (–223)
	7	Chase Elliott	711 (–240)
1	8	Matt Kenseth	703 (–248)
1	9	Jamie McMurray	700 (–251)
	10	Clint Bowyer	642 (–309)
	11	Jimmie Johnson	628 (–323)
	12	Ryan Blaney	623 (–328)
1	13	Kurt Busch	586 (–365)
1	14	Joey Logano	583 (–368)
	15	Ryan Newman	574 (–377)
	16	Erik Jones	574 (–377)
Official driver's standings

Manufacturers' Championship standings

Pos	Manufacturer	Points
1	Chevrolet	845
2	Ford	840 (–5)
3	Toyota	839 (–6)
Official manufacturers' standings

- Note: Only the first 16 positions are included for the driver standings.
- . – Driver has clinched a position in the Monster Energy NASCAR Cup Series playoffs.

Previous race: 2017 Pure Michigan 400	Monster Energy NASCAR Cup Series; 2017 season	Next race: 2017 Bojangles' Southern 500
