= 2017 I Love New York 355 at The Glen =

Race details
- Race 22 of 36 in the 2017 Monster Energy NASCAR Cup Series
- The 2017 I Love New York 355 at The Glen program cover, featuring Denny Hamlin
- Date: August 6, 2017
- Location: Watkins Glen International in Watkins Glen, New York
- Course: Permanent racing facility
- Course length: 2.45 miles (3.94 km)
- Distance: 90 laps, 220.5 mi (354.6 km)
- Average speed: 104.132 miles per hour (167.584 km/h)

Pole position
| Driver | Kyle Busch | Joe Gibbs Racing |
- Time: 69.490

Most laps led
| Driver | Martin Truex Jr. | Furniture Row Racing |
- Laps: 24

Winner
| No. 78 | Martin Truex Jr. | Furniture Row Racing |

Television in the United States
- Network: NBCSN
- Announcers: Leigh Diffey, Steve Letarte (booth), Mike Bagley (Esses), Parker Kligerman (Turn 5) and Jeff Burton (Turn 6 & 7)

Radio in the United States
- Radio: MRN
- Booth announcers: Joe Moore, Jeff Striegle and Rusty Wallace
- Turn announcers: Dave Moody (Esses), Alex Hayden (Inner loop & Turn 5) and Kyle Rickey (Turn 10 & 11)

The 2017 I Love New York 355 at The Glen was a Monster Energy NASCAR Cup Series race that was held on August 6, 2017, at Watkins Glen International in Watkins Glen, New York. Contested over 90 laps on the 2.45-mile (3.94 km) road course, it was the 22nd race of the 2017 Monster Energy NASCAR Cup Series season.

== Entry list ==
| No. | Driver | Team | Manufacturer |
|---|---|---|---|
| 1 | Jamie McMurray | Chip Ganassi Racing | Chevrolet |
| 2 | Brad Keselowski | Team Penske | Ford |
| 3 | Austin Dillon | Richard Childress Racing | Chevrolet |
| 4 | Kevin Harvick | Stewart–Haas Racing | Ford |
| 5 | Kasey Kahne | Hendrick Motorsports | Chevrolet |
| 6 | Trevor Bayne | Roush Fenway Racing | Ford |
| 10 | Danica Patrick | Stewart–Haas Racing | Ford |
| 11 | Denny Hamlin | Joe Gibbs Racing | Toyota |
| 13 | Ty Dillon (R) | Germain Racing | Chevrolet |
| 14 | Clint Bowyer | Stewart–Haas Racing | Ford |
| 15 | Gary Klutt | Premium Motorsports | Chevrolet |
| 17 | Ricky Stenhouse Jr. | Roush Fenway Racing | Ford |
| 18 | Kyle Busch | Joe Gibbs Racing | Toyota |
| 19 | Daniel Suárez (R) | Joe Gibbs Racing | Toyota |
| 20 | Matt Kenseth | Joe Gibbs Racing | Toyota |
| 21 | Ryan Blaney | Wood Brothers Racing | Ford |
| 22 | Joey Logano | Team Penske | Ford |
| 23 | Corey LaJoie (R) | BK Racing | Toyota |
| 24 | Chase Elliott | Hendrick Motorsports | Chevrolet |
| 27 | Paul Menard | Richard Childress Racing | Chevrolet |
| 31 | Ryan Newman | Richard Childress Racing | Chevrolet |
| 32 | Matt DiBenedetto | Go Fas Racing | Ford |
| 33 | Boris Said | Circle Sport – The Motorsports Group | Chevrolet |
| 34 | Landon Cassill | Front Row Motorsports | Ford |
| 37 | Chris Buescher | JTG Daugherty Racing | Chevrolet |
| 38 | David Ragan | Front Row Motorsports | Ford |
| 41 | Kurt Busch | Stewart–Haas Racing | Ford |
| 42 | Kyle Larson | Chip Ganassi Racing | Chevrolet |
| 43 | Aric Almirola | Richard Petty Motorsports | Ford |
| 47 | A. J. Allmendinger | JTG Daugherty Racing | Chevrolet |
| 48 | Jimmie Johnson | Hendrick Motorsports | Chevrolet |
| 72 | Cole Whitt | TriStar Motorsports | Chevrolet |
| 77 | Erik Jones (R) | Furniture Row Racing | Toyota |
| 78 | Martin Truex Jr. | Furniture Row Racing | Toyota |
| 83 | Brett Moffitt (i) | BK Racing | Toyota |
| 88 | Dale Earnhardt Jr. | Hendrick Motorsports | Chevrolet |
| 95 | Michael McDowell | Leavine Family Racing | Chevrolet |
Official entry list

== Practice ==
=== First practice ===
Kyle Busch was the fastest in the first practice session with a time of 70.270 seconds and a speed of 125.516 mph (201.998 km/h).

| Pos | No. | Driver | Team | Manufacturer | Time | Speed |
|---|---|---|---|---|---|---|
| 1 | 18 | Kyle Busch | Joe Gibbs Racing | Toyota | 70.270 | 125.516 |
| 2 | 78 | Martin Truex Jr. | Furniture Row Racing | Toyota | 70.675 | 124.797 |
| 3 | 11 | Denny Hamlin | Joe Gibbs Racing | Toyota | 70.817 | 124.546 |
Official first practice results

=== Final practice ===
Brad Keselowski was the fastest in the final practice session with a time of 70.067 seconds and a speed of 125.880 mph (202.584 km/h).

| Pos | No. | Driver | Team | Manufacturer | Time | Speed |
|---|---|---|---|---|---|---|
| 1 | 2 | Brad Keselowski | Team Penske | Ford | 70.067 | 125.880 |
| 2 | 41 | Kurt Busch | Stewart–Haas Racing | Ford | 70.077 | 125.862 |
| 3 | 78 | Martin Truex Jr. | Furniture Row Racing | Toyota | 70.224 | 125.598 |
Official final practice results

== Qualifying ==
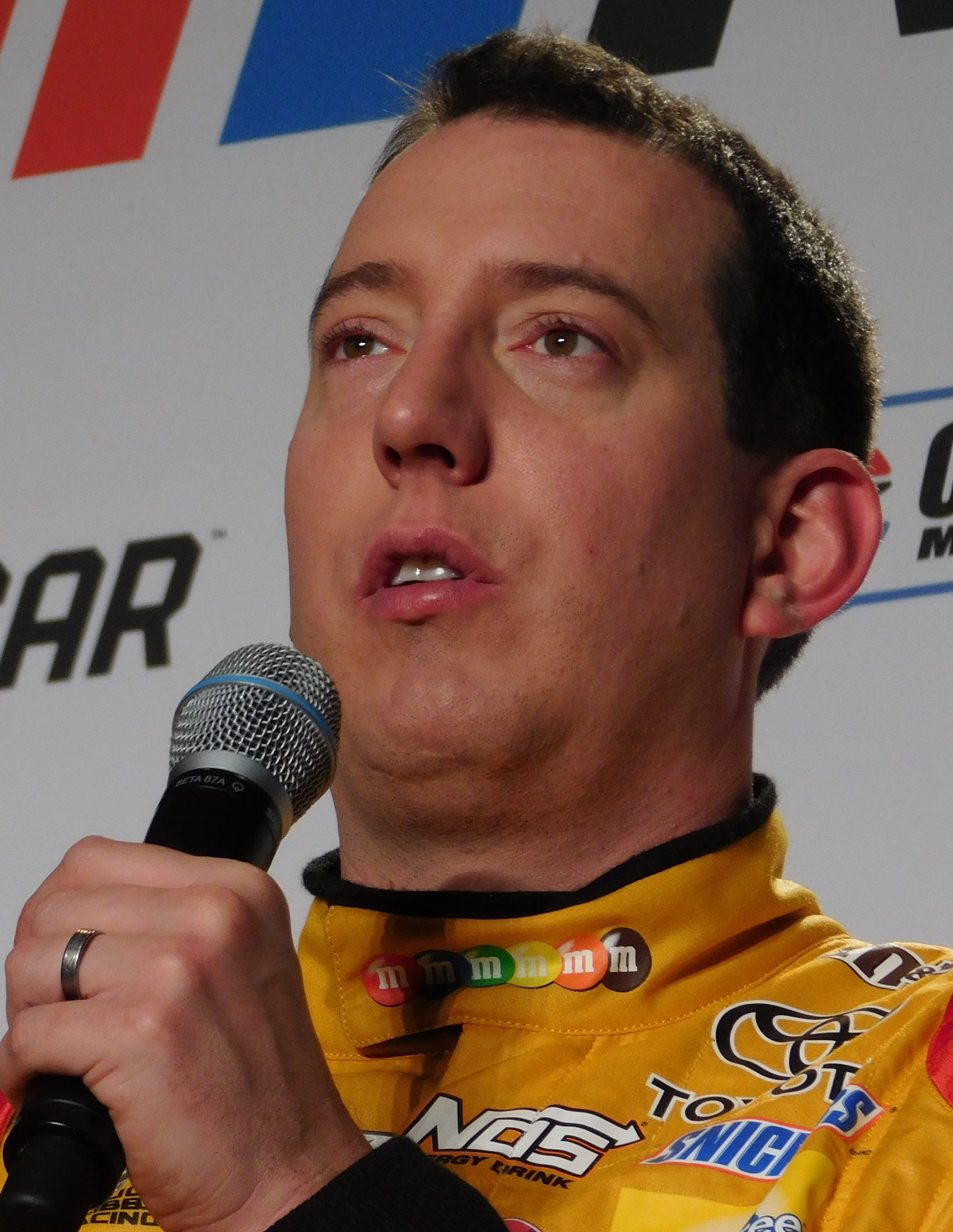
Kyle Busch scored the pole position.

Kyle Busch scored the pole for the race with a time of 69.490 and a speed of 126.925 mph (204.266 km/h).

=== Qualifying results ===
| Pos | No. | Driver | Team | Manufacturer | R1 | R2 |
|---|---|---|---|---|---|---|
| 1 | 18 | Kyle Busch | Joe Gibbs Racing | Toyota | 70.316 | 69.490 |
| 2 | 42 | Kyle Larson | Chip Ganassi Racing | Chevrolet | 70.415 | 69.862 |
| 3 | 78 | Martin Truex Jr. | Furniture Row Racing | Toyota | 70.005 | 70.132 |
| 4 | 24 | Chase Elliott | Hendrick Motorsports | Chevrolet | 69.958 | 70.232 |
| 5 | 19 | Daniel Suárez (R) | Joe Gibbs Racing | Toyota | 70.292 | 70.305 |
| 6 | 77 | Erik Jones (R) | Furniture Row Racing | Toyota | 70.444 | 70.314 |
| 7 | 47 | A. J. Allmendinger | JTG Daugherty Racing | Chevrolet | 70.593 | 70.353 |
| 8 | 2 | Brad Keselowski | Team Penske | Ford | 70.335 | 70.372 |
| 9 | 1 | Jamie McMurray | Chip Ganassi Racing | Chevrolet | 70.041 | 70.567 |
| 10 | 48 | Jimmie Johnson | Hendrick Motorsports | Chevrolet | 70.537 | 71.114 |
| 11 | 11 | Denny Hamlin | Joe Gibbs Racing | Toyota | 70.432 | 0.000 |
| 12 | 14 | Clint Bowyer | Stewart–Haas Racing | Ford | 70.504 | 0.000 |
| 13 | 22 | Joey Logano | Team Penske | Ford | 70.618 | — |
| 14 | 95 | Michael McDowell | Leavine Family Racing | Chevrolet | 70.630 | — |
| 15 | 20 | Matt Kenseth | Joe Gibbs Racing | Toyota | 70.665 | — |
| 16 | 21 | Ryan Blaney | Wood Brothers Racing | Ford | 70.687 | — |
| 17 | 37 | Chris Buescher | JTG Daugherty Racing | Ford | 70.726 | — |
| 18 | 41 | Kurt Busch | Stewart–Haas Racing | Ford | 70.730 | — |
| 19 | 5 | Kasey Kahne | Hendrick Motorsports | Chevrolet | 70.735 | — |
| 20 | 4 | Kevin Harvick | Stewart–Haas Racing | Ford | 70.740 | — |
| 21 | 27 | Paul Menard | Richard Childress Racing | Chevrolet | 70.806 | — |
| 22 | 17 | Ricky Stenhouse Jr. | Roush Fenway Racing | Ford | 70.860 | — |
| 23 | 31 | Ryan Newman | Richard Childress Racing | Chevrolet | 70.937 | — |
| 24 | 13 | Ty Dillon (R) | Germain Racing | Chevrolet | 71.122 | — |
| 25 | 10 | Danica Patrick | Stewart–Haas Racing | Ford | 71.162 | — |
| 26 | 72 | Cole Whitt | TriStar Motorsports | Chevrolet | 71.162 | — |
| 27 | 3 | Austin Dillon | Richard Childress Racing | Chevrolet | 71.332 | — |
| 28 | 88 | Dale Earnhardt Jr. | Hendrick Motorsports | Chevrolet | 71.442 | — |
| 29 | 43 | Aric Almirola | Richard Petty Motorsports | Ford | 71.566 | — |
| 30 | 6 | Trevor Bayne | Roush Fenway Racing | Ford | 71.710 | — |
| 31 | 38 | David Ragan | Front Row Motorsports | Ford | 72.220 | — |
| 32 | 34 | Landon Cassill | Front Row Motorsports | Ford | 72.516 | — |
| 33 | 83 | Brett Moffitt (i) | BK Racing | Toyota | 73.259 | — |
| 34 | 15 | Gary Klutt | Premium Motorsports | Chevrolet | 73.261 | — |
| 35 | 33 | Boris Said | Circle Sport – The Motorsports Group | Chevrolet | 74.037 | — |
| 36 | 23 | Corey LaJoie (R) | BK Racing | Toyota | 74.274 | — |
| 37 | 32 | Matt DiBenedetto | Go Fas Racing | Ford | 74.790 | — |
Official qualifying results

== Race ==
=== First stage ===
Trevor Bayne and Chase Elliott reported brake issues during the pace laps prior to the start of the race. While Elliott stayed out and raced on, Bayne took his car to the garage prior to the initial start. When his team fixed the problem, he joined the race on Lap 11, 10 laps down.

Kyle Busch led the field to the green flag at 3:21 p.m. Erik Jones, running sixth, overshot the entrance to the inner-loop and came to a complete stop, as a driver is required to do in that situation, before continuing on. Multiple drivers elected to short-pit the end of the first stage on Lap 18. Busch drove unchallenged to a first stage victory on Lap 21. Elliott, who was among those that short-pitted on Lap 18, took the lead when Busch and the rest pitted under the stage break. Busch made a second stop for a lug nut stuck between the left-front tire and the wheel. During the caution, Dale Earnhardt Jr., who reported on Lap 19 that he was losing power, took his car to the garage and retired from the race with engine issues.

=== Second stage ===
The race restarted on Lap 25. Kyle Larson (fourth) and Jamie McMurray (second) pitted on Lap 29, with McMurray spending roughly 30 seconds in his pit stall, dealing with an issue on the right-front tire. Elliott pitted from the lead on Lap 31, handing it to Daniel Suárez, who held off a charging Martin Truex Jr. with an impressive block in the final corner to win the second stage on Lap 41.

=== Final stage ===
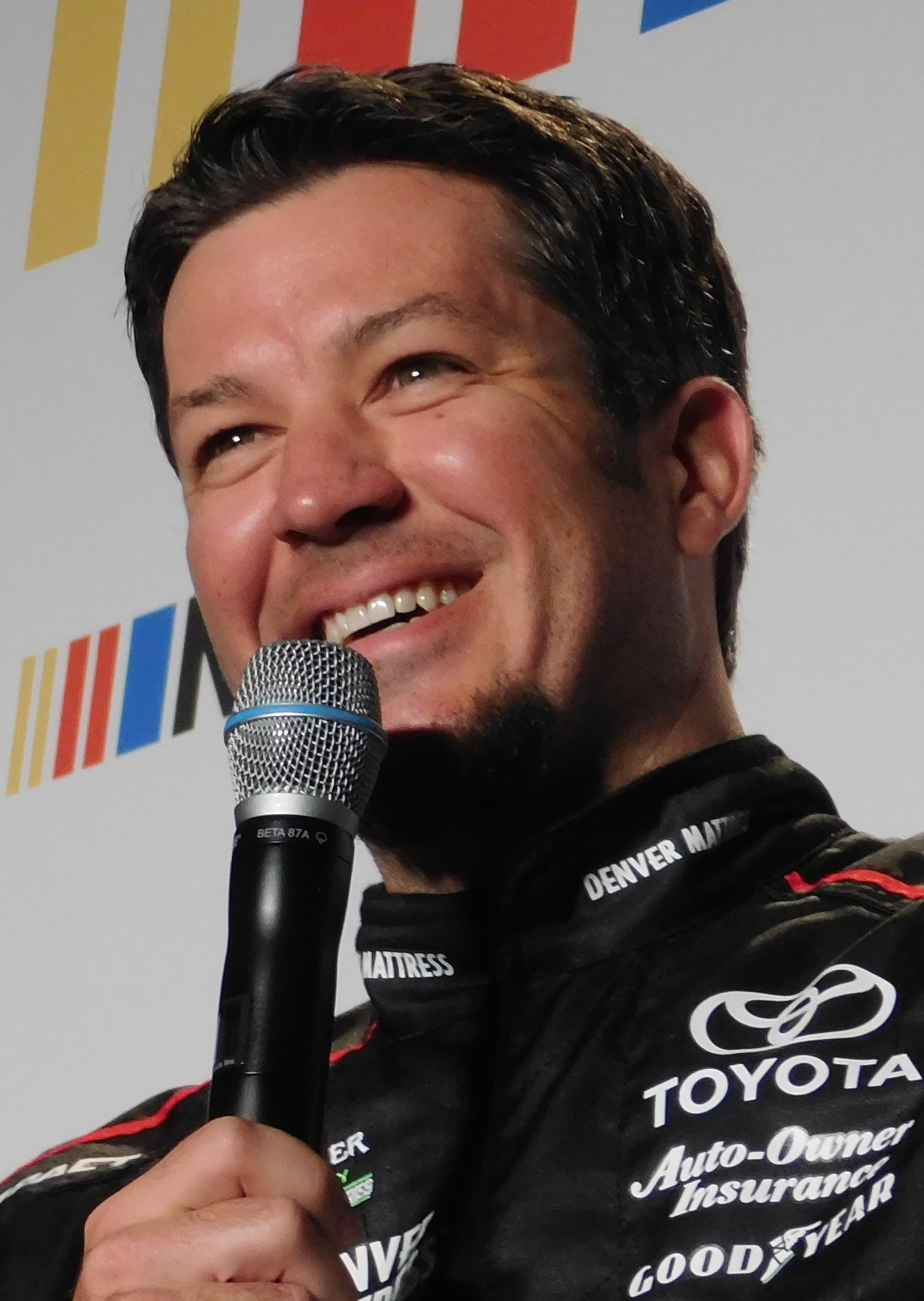
Martin Truex Jr. won the race.

On the ensuing Lap 45 restart, Truex took the lead from Suárez exiting Turn 1. Busch and Brad Keselowski made contact in the inner-loop, sending them both spinning, though both continued on and the race stayed green. A tire carcass from Landon Cassill's car on the backstretch brought out the third caution on Lap 51. Keselowski ascended to the lead when Truex and the rest of the leaders pitted. During the caution, Kevin Harvick made contact with Brett Moffitt while exiting his pit stall as Brett entered his, dealing moderate damage to the front of Harvick's car.

The race restarted on Lap 55. Truex applied pressure for a few laps to Keselowski, before Keselowski pulled aside and allowed him to take the lead entering Turn 11 on Lap 65. By Lap 69, almost everyone was told he/she was short of the fuel needed to make it to the finish. Keselowski, who last pitted during the second stage break, was told he was six laps short of making it. Larson pitted on Lap 69, ensuring he would make it to the finish on fuel, as did Joey Logano with 15 laps to go. Elliott and Kasey Kahne pitted for fuel with nine to go, and Busch and McMurray followed suit four laps later.

While Truex was conserving his fuel load for the finish, Keselowski reeled him in and powered by his outside on the approach to the inner-loop to retake the lead with 14 to go. Unfortunately, he didn't save enough to make it to the end and pitted from the lead with three to go. Ryan Blaney took over the lead for a short time with two to go, but ran out of fuel on the approach to the inner-loop. Truex took over the lead as the white flag waved. He botched his entry into the inner-loop and locked up entering Turn 10 on the final lap, however, allowing Matt Kenseth to close in on him. But in the end, Truex drove on to victory.

== Race results ==
=== Stage results ===
Stage 1 Laps: 20

| Pos | No | Driver | Team | Manufacturer | Points |
|---|---|---|---|---|---|
| 1 | 18 | Kyle Busch | Joe Gibbs Racing | Toyota | 10 |
| 2 | 78 | Martin Truex Jr. | Furniture Row Racing | Toyota | 9 |
| 3 | 24 | Chase Elliott | Hendrick Motorsports | Chevrolet | 8 |
| 4 | 42 | Kyle Larson | Chip Ganassi Racing | Chevrolet | 7 |
| 5 | 2 | Brad Keselowski | Team Penske | Ford | 6 |
| 6 | 1 | Jamie McMurray | Chip Ganassi Racing | Chevrolet | 5 |
| 7 | 22 | Joey Logano | Team Penske | Ford | 4 |
| 8 | 47 | A. J. Allmendinger | JTG Daughtery Racing | Chevrolet | 3 |
| 9 | 5 | Kasey Kahne | Hendrick Motorsports | Chevrolet | 2 |
| 10 | 17 | Ricky Stenhouse Jr. | Roush Fenway Racing | Ford | 1 |
Official stage one results

Stage 2 Laps: 20

| Pos | No | Driver | Team | Manufacturer | Points |
|---|---|---|---|---|---|
| 1 | 19 | Daniel Suárez (R) | Joe Gibbs Racing | Toyota | 10 |
| 2 | 78 | Martin Truex Jr. | Furniture Row Racing | Toyota | 9 |
| 3 | 20 | Matt Kenseth | Joe Gibbs Racing | Toyota | 8 |
| 4 | 21 | Ryan Blaney | Wood Brothers Racing | Ford | 7 |
| 5 | 77 | Erik Jones (R) | Furniture Row Racing | Toyota | 6 |
| 6 | 11 | Denny Hamlin | Joe Gibbs Racing | Toyota | 5 |
| 7 | 2 | Brad Keselowski | Team Penske | Ford | 4 |
| 8 | 41 | Kurt Busch | Stewart–Haas Racing | Ford | 3 |
| 9 | 18 | Kyle Busch | Joe Gibbs Racing | Toyota | 2 |
| 10 | 47 | A. J. Allmendinger | JTG Daughtery Racing | Chevrolet | 1 |
Official stage two results

=== Final stage results ===
Stage 3 Laps: 50

| Pos | Grid | No | Driver | Team | Manufacturer | Laps | Points |
|---|---|---|---|---|---|---|---|
| 1 | 3 | 78 | Martin Truex Jr. | Furniture Row Racing | Toyota | 90 | 58 |
| 2 | 15 | 20 | Matt Kenseth | Joe Gibbs Racing | Toyota | 90 | 43 |
| 3 | 5 | 19 | Daniel Suárez (R) | Joe Gibbs Racing | Toyota | 90 | 44 |
| 4 | 11 | 11 | Denny Hamlin | Joe Gibbs Racing | Toyota | 90 | 38 |
| 5 | 12 | 14 | Clint Bowyer | Stewart–Haas Racing | Ford | 90 | 32 |
| 6 | 18 | 41 | Kurt Busch | Stewart–Haas Racing | Ford | 90 | 34 |
| 7 | 1 | 18 | Kyle Busch | Joe Gibbs Racing | Toyota | 90 | 42 |
| 8 | 16 | 21 | Ryan Blaney | Wood Brothers Racing | Ford | 90 | 36 |
| 9 | 7 | 47 | A. J. Allmendinger | JTG Daugherty Racing | Chevrolet | 90 | 32 |
| 10 | 6 | 77 | Erik Jones (R) | Furniture Row Racing | Toyota | 90 | 33 |
| 11 | 17 | 37 | Chris Buescher | JTG Daugherty Racing | Chevrolet | 90 | 26 |
| 12 | 14 | 95 | Michael McDowell | Leavine Family Racing | Chevrolet | 90 | 25 |
| 13 | 4 | 24 | Chase Elliott | Hendrick Motorsports | Chevrolet | 90 | 32 |
| 14 | 9 | 1 | Jamie McMurray | Chip Ganassi Racing | Chevrolet | 90 | 28 |
| 15 | 8 | 2 | Brad Keselowski | Team Penske | Ford | 90 | 32 |
| 16 | 19 | 5 | Kasey Kahne | Hendrick Motorsports | Chevrolet | 90 | 23 |
| 17 | 20 | 4 | Kevin Harvick | Stewart–Haas Racing | Ford | 90 | 20 |
| 18 | 21 | 27 | Paul Menard | Richard Childress Racing | Chevrolet | 90 | 19 |
| 19 | 24 | 13 | Ty Dillon (R) | Germain Racing | Chevrolet | 90 | 18 |
| 20 | 22 | 17 | Ricky Stenhouse Jr. | Roush Fenway Racing | Ford | 90 | 18 |
| 21 | 29 | 43 | Aric Almirola | Richard Petty Motorsports | Ford | 90 | 16 |
| 22 | 25 | 10 | Danica Patrick | Stewart–Haas Racing | Ford | 90 | 15 |
| 23 | 2 | 42 | Kyle Larson | Chip Ganassi Racing | Chevrolet | 90 | 21 |
| 24 | 13 | 22 | Joey Logano | Team Penske | Ford | 90 | 17 |
| 25 | 23 | 31 | Ryan Newman | Richard Childress Racing | Chevrolet | 90 | 12 |
| 26 | 27 | 3 | Austin Dillon | Richard Childress Racing | Chevrolet | 90 | 11 |
| 27 | 31 | 38 | David Ragan | Front Row Motorsports | Ford | 90 | 10 |
| 28 | 37 | 32 | Matt DiBenedetto | Go Fas Racing | Ford | 90 | 9 |
| 29 | 10 | 48 | Jimmie Johnson | Hendrick Motorsports | Chevrolet | 90 | 8 |
| 30 | 35 | 33 | Boris Said | Circle Sport – The Motorsports Group | Chevrolet | 89 | 7 |
| 31 | 34 | 15 | Gary Klutt | Premium Motorsports | Chevrolet | 89 | 6 |
| 32 | 33 | 83 | Brett Moffitt (i) | BK Racing | Toyota | 89 | 0 |
| 33 | 36 | 23 | Corey LaJoie (R) | BK Racing | Toyota | 89 | 4 |
| 34 | 26 | 72 | Cole Whitt | TriStar Motorsports | Chevrolet | 81 | 3 |
| 35 | 30 | 6 | Trevor Bayne | Roush Fenway Racing | Ford | 80 | 2 |
| 36 | 32 | 34 | Landon Cassill | Front Row Motorsports | Ford | 78 | 1 |
| 37 | 28 | 88 | Dale Earnhardt Jr. | Hendrick Motorsports | Chevrolet | 22 | 1 |
Official race results

=== Race statistics ===
- Lead changes: 6 among different drivers
- Cautions/Laps: 3 for 8
- Red flags: 0
- Time of race: 2 hours, 7 minutes and 3 seconds
- Average speed: 104.132 miles per hour (167.584 km/h)

== Media ==
=== Television ===
NBC Sports covered the race on the television side. Leigh Diffey and Steve Letarte had the call in the regular booth for the race; Diffey subbed for Rick Allen, who was covering the IAAF World Championship in London. Motor Racing Network broadcaster Mike Bagley had the call from the Esses, Parker Kligerman had the call from Turn 5, and Jeff Burton had the call from Turns 6 & 7. Dave Burns, Marty Snider and Kelli Stavast reported from pit lane during the race.

NBCSN
| Booth announcers | Turn announcers | Pit reporters |
|---|---|---|
| Lap-by-lap: Leigh Diffey; Color-commentator: Steve Letarte | Esses Announcer: Mike Bagley; Turn 5 Announcer Parker Kligerman; Turns 6 & 7 Announcer Jeff Burton | Dave Burns; Marty Snider; Kelli Stavast |

=== Radio ===
Motor Racing Network had the radio call for the race, which was simulcast on Sirius XM NASCAR Radio.

MRN
| Booth announcers | Turn announcers | Pit reporters |
|---|---|---|
| Lead announcer: Joe Moore; Announcer: Jeff Striegle; Announcer: Rusty Wallace | Esses: Dave Moody; Inner loop & Turn 5: Alex Hayden; Turn 10 & 11: Kyle Rickey | Jack Arute; Winston Kelley; Steve Post |

== Standings after the race ==
Drivers' Championship standings

| | Pos | Driver | Points |
|---|---|---|---|
| | 1 | Martin Truex Jr. | 881 |
| 2 | 2 | Kyle Busch | 765 (–116) |
| 1 | 3 | Kyle Larson | 759 (–122) |
| 1 | 4 | Kevin Harvick | 746 (–135) |
| 1 | 5 | Denny Hamlin | 687 (–194) |
| 1 | 6 | Brad Keselowski | 681 (–200) |
| | 7 | Chase Elliott | 648 (–233) |
| | 8 | Jamie McMurray | 643 (–238) |
| | 9 | Matt Kenseth | 637 (–244) |
| | 10 | Clint Bowyer | 609 (–272) |
| | 11 | Jimmie Johnson | 574 (–307) |
| | 12 | Ryan Blaney | 565 (–316) |
| | 13 | Joey Logano | 542 (–339) |
| | 14 | Kurt Busch | 528 (–353) |
| 3 | 15 | Daniel Suárez | 508 (–373) |
| 1 | 16 | Ryan Newman | 503 (–378) |
Official driver's standings

Manufacturers' Championship standings

| | Pos | Manufacturer | Points |
|---|---|---|---|
| 1 | 1 | Ford | 776 |
| 1 | 2 | Chevrolet | 774 (–2) |
| | 3 | Toyota | 764 (–12) |
Official manufacturers' standings

- Note: Only the first 16 positions are included for the driver standings.
- . – Driver has clinched a position in the Monster Energy NASCAR Cup Series playoffs.

| Previous race: 2017 Overton's 400 | Monster Energy NASCAR Cup Series; 2017 season | Next race: 2017 Pure Michigan 400 |
