= 2013 Camping World RV Sales 500 =

32nd race of 2013 NASCAR Sprint Cup series

Race details
- Race 32 of 36 in the 2013 NASCAR Sprint Cup Series
- Talladega Superspeedway
- Date: October 20, 2013
- Location: Talladega Superspeedway, Talladega, Alabama
- Course: Permanent racing facility
- Course length: 2.66 miles (4.256 km)
- Distance: 188 laps, 500.08 mi (800.128 km)

Pole position
Driver	Aric Almirola	Richard Petty Motorsports
- Time: 47.406 seconds

Most laps led
Driver	Jimmie Johnson	Hendrick Motorsports
- Laps: 47

Winner
No. 1	Jamie McMurray	Earnhardt Ganassi Racing

Television in the United States
- Network: NASCAR on ESPN
- Announcers: Allen Bestwick, Dale Jarrett and Andy Petree

The 2013 Camping World RV Sales 500 was a NASCAR Sprint Cup Series race held on October 20, 2013, at Talladega Superspeedway in Talladega, Alabama. Contested over 188 laps on the 2.66 mile superspeedway, it was the 32nd race of the 2013 Sprint Cup Series championship, and the sixth race in the Chase for the Sprint Cup. Jamie McMurray of Earnhardt Ganassi Racing won the race, breaking a 108 race winless streak, while Dale Earnhardt Jr. finished second. Ricky Stenhouse Jr., Paul Menard, and Kyle Busch rounded out the top five. The race had two caution flags, 20 leaders, and 52 lead changes, both of them season highs. This was the second straight Chase race to be won by a non-Chaser.

== Report ==
=== Background ===
Talladega Superspeedway, the race track where the race was held.

Talladega Superspeedway is a four turn tri-oval track that is 2.66 miles (4.28 km) long. The track's turns are banked at 33 degrees, while the front stretch, the location of the finish line, is 18 degrees. The back stretch, opposite of the front, is at only two degrees. The racetrack has a seating capacity for 109,000 spectators. Matt Kenseth was the defending race winner after winning the event during the 2012 race.

== Entry list ==
(R) - Denotes rookie driver.

(i) - Denotes driver who is ineligible for series driver points.

No.	Driver	Team	Manufacturer
1	Jamie McMurray	Earnhardt Ganassi Racing	Chevrolet
2	Brad Keselowski	Penske Racing	Ford
5	Kasey Kahne	Hendrick Motorsports	Chevrolet
7	Dave Blaney	Tommy Baldwin Racing	Chevrolet
9	Marcos Ambrose	Richard Petty Motorsports	Ford
10	Danica Patrick (R)	Stewart–Haas Racing	Chevrolet
11	Denny Hamlin	Joe Gibbs Racing	Toyota
12	Sam Hornish Jr. (i)	Penske Racing	Ford
13	Casey Mears	Germain Racing	Ford
14	Austin Dillon (i)	Stewart–Haas Racing	Chevrolet
15	Clint Bowyer	Michael Waltrip Racing	Toyota
16	Greg Biffle	Roush Fenway Racing	Ford
17	Ricky Stenhouse Jr. (R)	Roush Fenway Racing	Ford
18	Kyle Busch	Joe Gibbs Racing	Toyota
20	Matt Kenseth	Joe Gibbs Racing	Toyota
21	Trevor Bayne (i)	Wood Brothers Racing	Ford
22	Joey Logano	Penske Racing	Ford
24	Jeff Gordon	Hendrick Motorsports	Chevrolet
27	Paul Menard	Richard Childress Racing	Chevrolet
29	Kevin Harvick	Richard Childress Racing	Chevrolet
30	Cole Whitt (i)	Swan Racing	Toyota
31	Jeff Burton	Richard Childress Racing	Chevrolet
32	Terry Labonte	FAS Lane Racing	Ford
33	Landon Cassill (i)	Circle Sport	Chevrolet
34	David Ragan	Front Row Motorsports	Ford
35	Josh Wise (i)	Front Row Motorsports	Ford
36	J. J. Yeley	Tommy Baldwin Racing	Chevrolet
38	David Gilliland	Front Row Motorsports	Ford
39	Ryan Newman	Stewart–Haas Racing	Chevrolet
40	Tony Raines (i)	Circle Sport	Chevrolet
42	Juan Pablo Montoya	Earnhardt Ganassi Racing	Chevrolet
43	Aric Almirola	Richard Petty Motorsports	Ford
47	Bobby Labonte	JTG Daugherty Racing	Toyota
48	Jimmie Johnson	Hendrick Motorsports	Chevrolet
51	Justin Allgaier (i)	HScott Motorsports	Chevrolet
55	Michael Waltrip	Michael Waltrip Racing	Toyota
56	Martin Truex Jr.	Michael Waltrip Racing	Toyota
78	Kurt Busch	Furniture Row Racing	Chevrolet
83	David Reutimann	BK Racing	Toyota
87	Joe Nemechek (i)	NEMCO-Jay Robinson Racing	Toyota
88	Dale Earnhardt Jr.	Hendrick Motorsports	Chevrolet
93	Travis Kvapil	BK Racing	Toyota
98	Michael McDowell	Phil Parsons Racing	Ford
99	Carl Edwards	Roush Fenway Racing	Ford
Official entry list

=== Practice and qualifying ===
Rain cancelled qualifying and Aric Almirola was awarded the pole based on his practice speed. Sam Hornish Jr. did not qualify due to lack of attempts.

=== Race summary ===
Jamie McMurray passed Jimmie Johnson with 15 laps to go. For the final 15 laps McMurray stumped runner-up Dale Earnhardt Jr. holding Earnhardt off for the rest of the race. Austin Dillon spent most of the final 50 laps in third place. On the final lap Dillon got tapped from behind by Ricky Stenhouse Jr. Dillon cart-wheeled over Casey Mears. Dale Earnhardt Jr. made a pass on Jamie McMurray, but McMurray took the win as Earnhardt had completed his pass after the caution came out. Officials confirmed 30 minutes after the race was over that McMurray was leader at the moment of caution.

== Results ==
=== Qualifying ===
Grid	No.	Driver	Team	Manufacturer	Time	Speed
1	43	Aric Almirola	Richard Petty Motorsports	Ford	47.406	202.000
2	31	Jeff Burton	Richard Childress Racing	Chevrolet	47.409	201.987
3	9	Marcos Ambrose	Richard Petty Motorsports	Ford	47.345	201.876
4	56	Martin Truex Jr.	Michael Waltrip Racing	Toyota	47.440	201.855
5	99	Carl Edwards	Roush Fenway Racing	Ford	47.499	201.604
6	16	Greg Biffle	Roush Fenway Racing	Ford	47.561	201.341
7	34	David Ragan	Front Row Motorsports	Ford	47.602	201.168
8	88	Dale Earnhardt Jr.	Hendrick Motorsports	Chevrolet	47.620	201.092
9	1	Jamie McMurray	Earnhardt Ganassi Racing	Chevrolet	47.625	201.071
10	13	Casey Mears	Germain Racing	Ford	47.663	200.911
11	48	Jimmie Johnson	Hendrick Motorsports	Chevrolet	47.856	200.100
12	20	Matt Kenseth	Joe Gibbs Racing	Toyota	48.002	199.492
13	2	Brad Keselowski	Penske Racing	Ford	48.006	199.475
14	35	Josh Wise	Front Row Motorsports	Ford	48.020	199.417
15	11	Denny Hamlin	Joe Gibbs Racing	Toyota	48.038	199.342
16	14	Austin Dillon	Stewart–Haas Racing	Chevrolet	48.039	199.338
17	39	Ryan Newman	Stewart–Haas Racing	Chevrolet	48.075	199.198
18	22	Joey Logano	Penske Racing	Ford	48.081	199.164
19	24	Jeff Gordon	Hendrick Motorsports	Chevrolet	48.100	199.085
20	15	Clint Bowyer	Michael Waltrip Racing	Toyota	48.113	199.031
21	17	Ricky Stenhouse Jr. (R)	Roush Fenway Racing	Ford	48.157	198.580
22	55	Michael Waltrip	Michael Waltrip Racing	Toyota	48.173	198.784
23	10	Danica Patrick (R)	Stewart–Haas Racing	Chevrolet	48.239	198.512
24	38	David Gilliland	Front Row Motorsports	Ford	48.283	198.331
25	83	David Reutimann	BK Racing	Toyota	48.294	198.286
26	21	Trevor Bayne	Wood Brothers Racing	Ford	48.310	198.220
27	18	Kyle Busch	Joe Gibbs Racing	Toyota	48.429	197.733
28	5	Kasey Kahne	Hendrick Motorsports	Chevrolet	48.456	197.623
29	47	Bobby Labonte	JTG Daugherty Racing	Toyota	48.462	197.598
30	78	Kurt Busch	Furniture Row Racing	Chevrolet	48.479	197.529
31	30	Cole Whitt	Swan Racing Company	Toyota	48.484	197.508
32	42	Juan Pablo Montoya	Earnhardt Ganassi Racing	Chevrolet	48.556	197.216
33	29	Kevin Harvick	Richard Childress Racing	Chevrolet	48.639	196.879
34	27	Paul Menard	Richard Childress Racing	Chevrolet	48.842	196.061
35	51	Justin Allgaier	Phoenix Racing	Chevrolet	50.112	191.092
36	98	Michael McDowell	Phil Parsons Racing	Ford	50.631	189.133
37	36	J. J. Yeley	Tommy Baldwin Racing	Chevrolet	50.723	188.790
38	93	Travis Kvapil	BK Racing	Toyota	50.804	188.489
39	7	Dave Blaney	Tommy Baldwin Racing	Chevrolet	50.912	188.089
40	32	Terry Labonte	FAS Lane Racing	Ford	51.096	187.412
41	40	Tony Raines	Circle Sport	Chevrolet	51.223	186.947
42	87	Joe Nemechek	NEMCO-Jay Robinson Racing	Toyota	51.407	186.278
43	33	Landon Cassill	Circle Sport	Chevrolet	51.904	184.494
Failed to Qualify
	12	Sam Hornish Jr.	Penske Racing	Ford	48.079	199.172
Sources:

- Qualifying was canceled because of rain showers, prompting the grid to be set by first practice lap times.

=== Race results ===
Pos	Car	Driver	Team	Manufacturer	Laps
1	1	Jamie McMurray	Earnhardt Ganassi Racing	Chevrolet	188
2	88	Dale Earnhardt Jr.	Hendrick Motorsports	Chevrolet	188
3	17	Ricky Stenhouse Jr.	Roush Fenway Racing	Ford	188
4	27	Paul Menard	Richard Childress Racing	Chevrolet	188
5	18	Kyle Busch	Joe Gibbs Racing	Toyota	188
6	34	David Ragan	Front Row Motorsports	Ford	188
7	38	David Gilliland	Front Row Motorsports	Ford	188
8	56	Martin Truex Jr.	Michael Waltrip Racing	Toyota	188
9	39	Ryan Newman	Stewart–Haas Racing	Chevrolet	188
10	15	Clint Bowyer	Michael Waltrip Racing	Toyota	188
11	16	Greg Biffle	Roush Fenway Racing	Ford	188
12	29	Kevin Harvick	Richard Childress Racing	Chevrolet	188
13	48	Jimmie Johnson	Hendrick Motorsports	Chevrolet	188
14	24	Jeff Gordon	Hendrick Motorsports	Chevrolet	188
15	98	Michael McDowell	Phil Parsons Racing	Ford	188
16	22	Joey Logano	Penske Racing	Ford	188
17	99	Carl Edwards	Roush Fenway Racing	Ford	188
18	78	Kurt Busch	Furniture Row Racing	Chevrolet	188
19	93	Travis Kvapil	BK Racing	Toyota	188
20	20	Matt Kenseth	Joe Gibbs Racing	Toyota	188
21	31	Jeff Burton	Richard Childress Racing	Chevrolet	188
22	43	Aric Almirola	Richard Petty Motorsports	Ford	188
23	21	Trevor Bayne	Wood Brothers Racing	Ford	188
24	51	Justin Allgaier	Phoenix Racing	Chevrolet	188
25	7	Dave Blaney	Tommy Baldwin Racing	Chevrolet	188
26	14	Austin Dillon	Stewart–Haas Racing	Chevrolet	187
27	13	Casey Mears	Germain Racing	Ford	187
28	36	J. J. Yeley	Tommy Baldwin Racing	Chevrolet	187
29	2	Brad Keselowski	Penske Racing	Ford	187
30	35	Josh Wise	Front Row Motorsports	Ford	187
31	30	Cole Whitt	Swan Racing Company	Toyota	187
32	55	Michael Waltrip	Michael Waltrip Racing	Toyota	187
33	10	Danica Patrick	Stewart–Haas Racing	Chevrolet	187
34	47	Bobby Labonte	JTG Daugherty Racing	Toyota	187
35	32	Terry Labonte	FAS Lane Racing	Ford	187
36	5	Kasey Kahne	Hendrick Motorsports	Chevrolet	186
37	33	Landon Cassill	Circle Sport	Chevrolet	183
38	11	Denny Hamlin	Joe Gibbs Racing	Toyota	142
39	9	Marcos Ambrose	Richard Petty Motorsports	Ford	134
40	83	David Reutimann	BK Racing	Toyota	119
41	42	Juan Pablo Montoya	Earnhardt Ganassi Racing	Chevrolet	78
42	87	Joe Nemechek	NEMCO-Jay Robinson Racing	Toyota	60
43	40	Tony Raines	Circle Sport	Chevrolet	2

== Standings after the race ==
Drivers' Championship standings

Pos	Driver	Points

Manufacturers' Championship standings

Pos	Manufacturer	Points

Previous race: 2013 Bank of America 500	Sprint Cup Series; 2013 season	Next race: 2013 Goody's Headache Relief Shot 500
