= Cole Whitt =

American racing driver (born 1991)

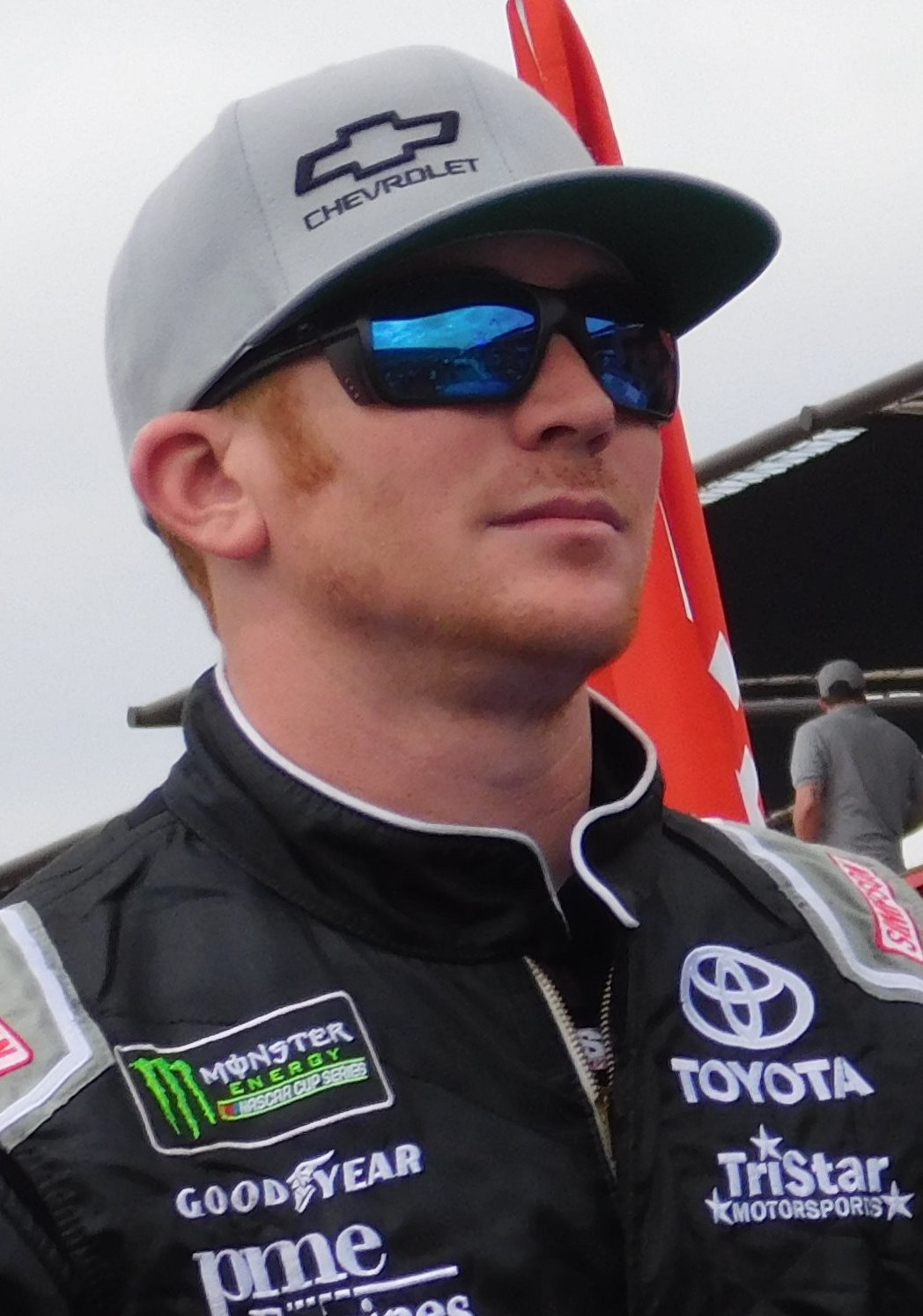
- Whitt at Auto Club Speedway in 2017
- Born: Cole Daniel Whitt; June 22, 1991 (age 35); San Diego, California, U.S.
- Achievements: Youngest ever USAC Midget National Championship Champion (17 years, 5 months, and 5 days); 2008 USAC Midget National Championship National Midget Champion; 2009 Copper World Classic Silver Crown Winner
- Awards: 2006 Hoosier Sprint Car Rookie of The Year; 2010 USAC Super License Award

NASCAR Cup Series career
- 161 races run over 8 years
- 2018 position: 35th
- Best finish: 31st (2014, 2015)
- First race: 2011 Kobalt Tools 500 (Phoenix)
- Last race: 2018 Can-Am 500 (Phoenix)
Wins	Top tens	Poles
0	0	0

NASCAR O'Reilly Auto Parts Series career
- 53 races run over 5 years
- 2016 position: 110th
- Best finish: 7th (2012)
- First race: 2010 WYPALL 200 (Phoenix)
- Last race: 2016 Ford EcoBoost 300 (Homestead)
Wins	Top tens	Poles
0	18	0

NASCAR FedEx Freight Truck Series career
- 28 races run over 4 years
- 2016 position: 91st
- Best finish: 9th (2011)
- First race: 2010 Ford 200 (Homestead)
- Last race: 2016 Texas Roadhouse 200 (Martinsville)
Wins	Top tens	Poles
0	11	1
- Statistics up to date as of November 11, 2018.

Cole Daniel Whitt (born June 22, 1991) is an American professional racing driver who has competed in dirt, off-road, and stock car racing.

After advancing his way through kart racing, Whitt moved up to sprint cars and became a development driver for Team Red Bull. After running in the K&N Pro Series East, Whitt made his NASCAR debut in 2010. He last competed part-time in the Monster Energy NASCAR Cup Series, driving the No. 72 Chevrolet Camaro ZL1 for TriStar Motorsports.

== Racing career ==
=== USAC ===
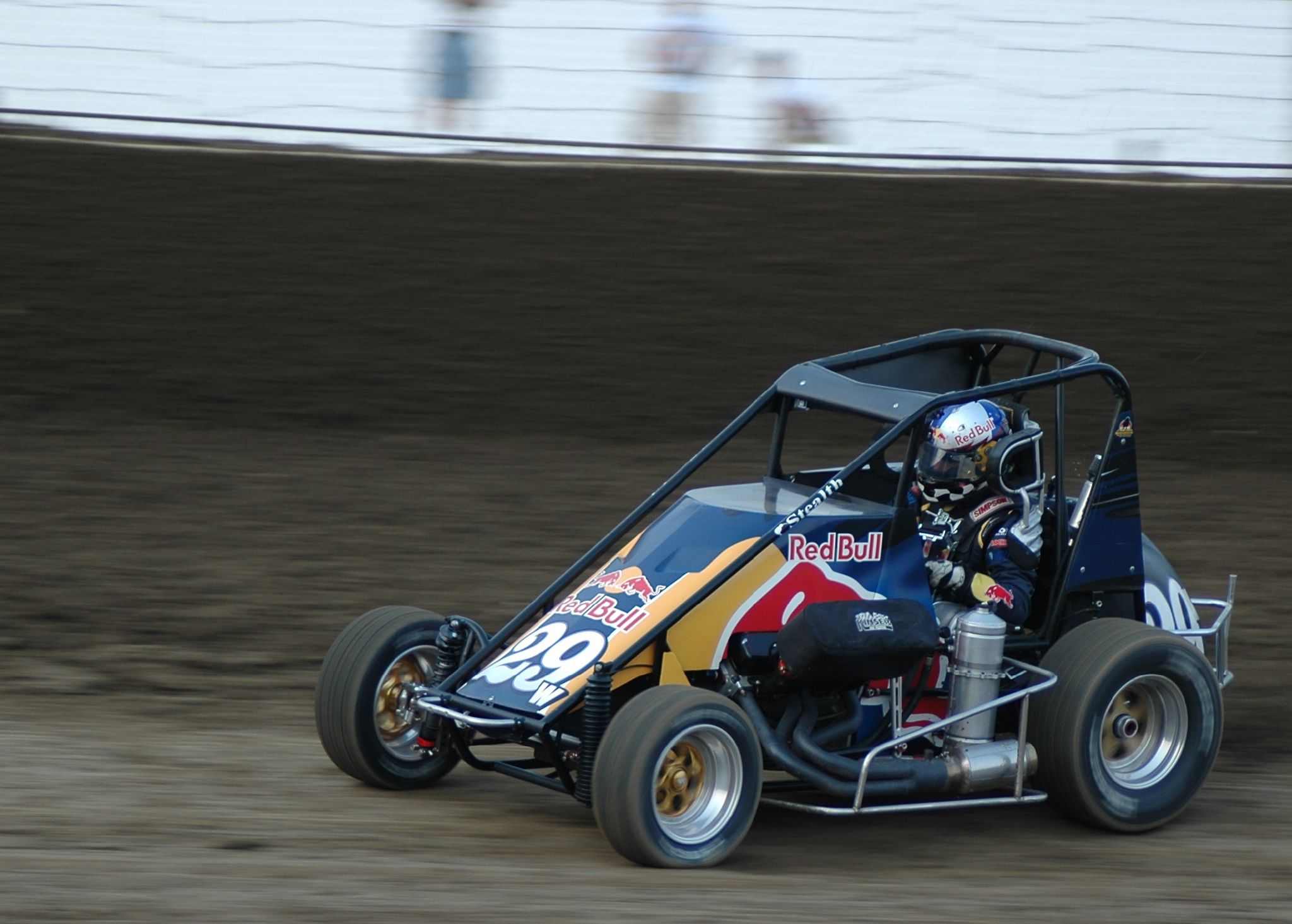
Whitt's 2007 midget car

Cole Whitt, born to Tobin and Kim Whitt, was inspired to race when he saw his cousin Brandon with a go-kart. After winning championships in go-karts, Whitt moved up to sprint cars in 2004. Whitt was quickly noticed by Red Bull and was in the semifinals for Red Bull's driver development search. After winning the Hoosier Sprint Rookie of the Year award in 2006, Whitt traveled around the United States the next year, running sixty races and gaining top-tens in 34 of those starts. To continue his racing career, Whitt and his mother moved to Lebanon, Indiana. In 2008, Whitt became the youngest winner of the USAC National Midget Championship, while winning the Hut Hundred. The next year Whitt raced in Silver Crown, Sprints, and Midgets, earning seventeen wins driving for Keith Kunz.

=== NASCAR ===
==== Early years ====
Whitt moved up to stock cars in 2010, the same year he won the Super License award for USAC. Whitt ran for the Camping World East Series championship, where he impressed by winning the pole in his first start at Greenville-Pickens Speedway. Whitt eventually finished fourth in points. Whitt was rewarded with making his Nationwide Series debut at Phoenix International Raceway, where he made the race and finished fifteenth. The next week, Whitt ran both the Nationwide and Truck Series events at Homestead-Miami Speedway, finishing seventeenth and 28th respectively, running the Truck race for Turn One Racing. Whitt drove for Turn One in 2011 and competed for Rookie of the Year honors. After failing to qualify in the No. 60 truck at Daytona, Whitt drove the No. 93 for RSS Racing before returning to Turn One. Whitt won the pole at Darlington, and became the first rookie to lead the Truck Series points after Charlotte, winding up ninth in points at the end of the season. He also drove a third Team Red Bull entry in the Sprint Cup Series in the final two races of the season at Phoenix International Raceway and Homestead-Miami Speedway, but ended Homestead with a DNF near the finish of the race.

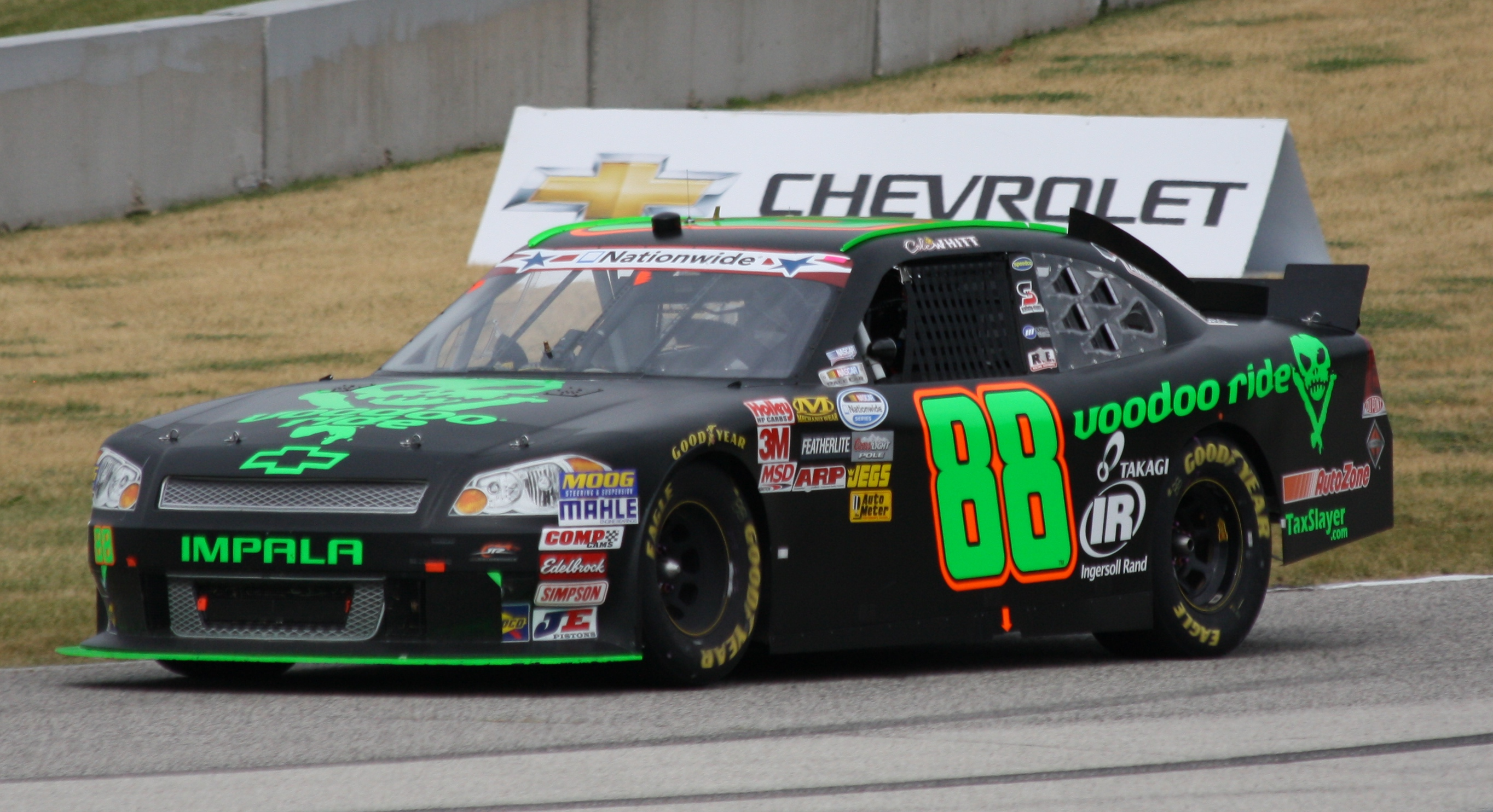
Whitt in 2012 at Road America

==== Xfinity Series ====
With the closing of Red Bull's racing program after the 2011 season, Whitt signed a contract with JR Motorsports to drive that team's No. 88 Chevrolet in the Nationwide Series in 2012, competing for Rookie of the Year honors. He also competed on a start and park basis in the Sprint Cup Series in selected races for Turn One Racing and Circle Sport. At the October Talladega race, Whitt was running in the top-fifteen before a crash involving Carl Edwards and Joey Logano took out Whitt on lap seventeen.

In 2013, Whitt and JR Motorsports parted ways with the team citing lack of sponsorship. He later joined forces with Tri-Star Motorsports, driving their No. 44 Nationwide entry from Dover onward. He earned his first top-ten of the year with an eighth-place finish at Road America. Late in the season, he ran seven Sprint Cup races with Swan Racing Company as a replacement for David Stremme. The team then hired him for the full 2014 season, placing him in their new second team, the No. 26.

==== Cup Series ====
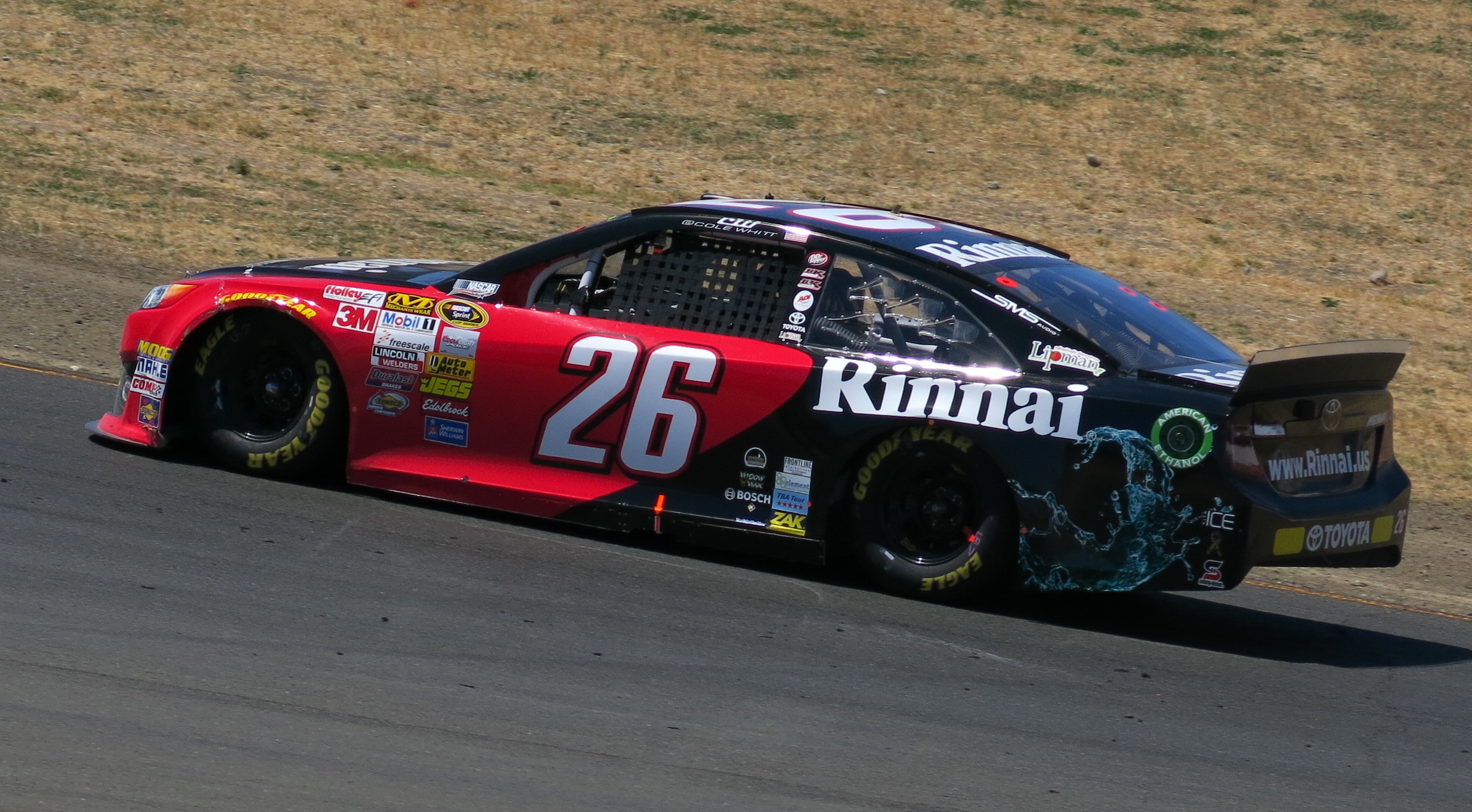
Whitt's No. 26 BK Racing car at Sonoma Raceway in 2014

During 2014 Daytona 500 practice, Whitt's car had debris hit the nose, and without a backup car due to teammate Parker Kligerman's crash during the session, Whitt's team was forced to make repairs, and he also did not have a provisional to lock him into the race. In the Budweiser Duels, Whitt's transfer into the 500 varied, but gained eight spots in the final five laps to finish eleventh and qualify. When asked about the Duel, Whitt stated, "It was a hard way to do it, being out and back in with just a lap or so to go. I didn't know if I was in when I crossed the finish line. It was a nail biter, for sure." In the Daytona 500, Whitt ran as high as fourth, but ran out of fuel, and was later down two laps. However, Whitt eventually returned onto the lead lap, but was involved in a crash with seven laps remaining. Whitt finished 28th in the race.

Due to Swan Racing's restructuring, Whitt's future with the team was left in doubt, and on April 21, a representative from FUEL Sports Management Group announced that Whitt did not have a ride for the Toyota Owners 400 at Richmond. However, Swan minority partner Anthony Marlowe stated his intent to run with Whitt for the remainder of the 2014 season. Days later, the 26 team was acquired by the former Swan co-owner and he merged his ownership into BK Racing, with Whitt remaining behind the wheel. The team debuted at Richmond for the Toyota Owners 400 under the BK Racing flag and maintained all accumulated 2014 driver and owner points.

At Daytona in the Coke Zero 400, Whitt was caught up into a multi-car pileup and he t-boned Kyle Busch throwing Busch onto his roof. At Watkins Glen in the Cheez-It 355 at The Glen, Whitt crashed early in the race when his car drove straight into a tire barrier in turn 1 in an accident that loosely resembled Jimmie Johnson's infamous crash at the same spot in 2000. Whitt climbed out mostly unscathed. Whitt led his first lap in Sprint Cup competition under caution in the GEICO 500 at Talladega. He would ultimately hang on for his then career-best finish of fifteenth.

At the end of the season, in which he finished 31st in points, BK Racing owners Ron Devine and Anthony Marlowe announced that Whitt would not return to BK Racing in 2015. It was then rumored that he had left the team so he could replace David Ragan in the No. 34 Ford for Front Row Motorsports. Marlowe then sent a Tweet congratulating Whitt for getting the ride with the team. However, less than 24 hours later, Front Row Motorsports spokesperson Shari Spiewak squashed that announcement by stating that it was false and that they denied that Whitt was replacing Ragan at Front Row and that they are working to get Ragan and teammate David Gilliland contract extensions with them, leaving many including Ragan puzzled about what Marlowe was thinking. Marlowe later apologized to Ragan and the team about his inadvertent tweet in an interview with MotorSportsTalk, although he still insisted Whitt was headed to Front Row in some capacity. Whitt would eventually announce that he had left BK Racing.

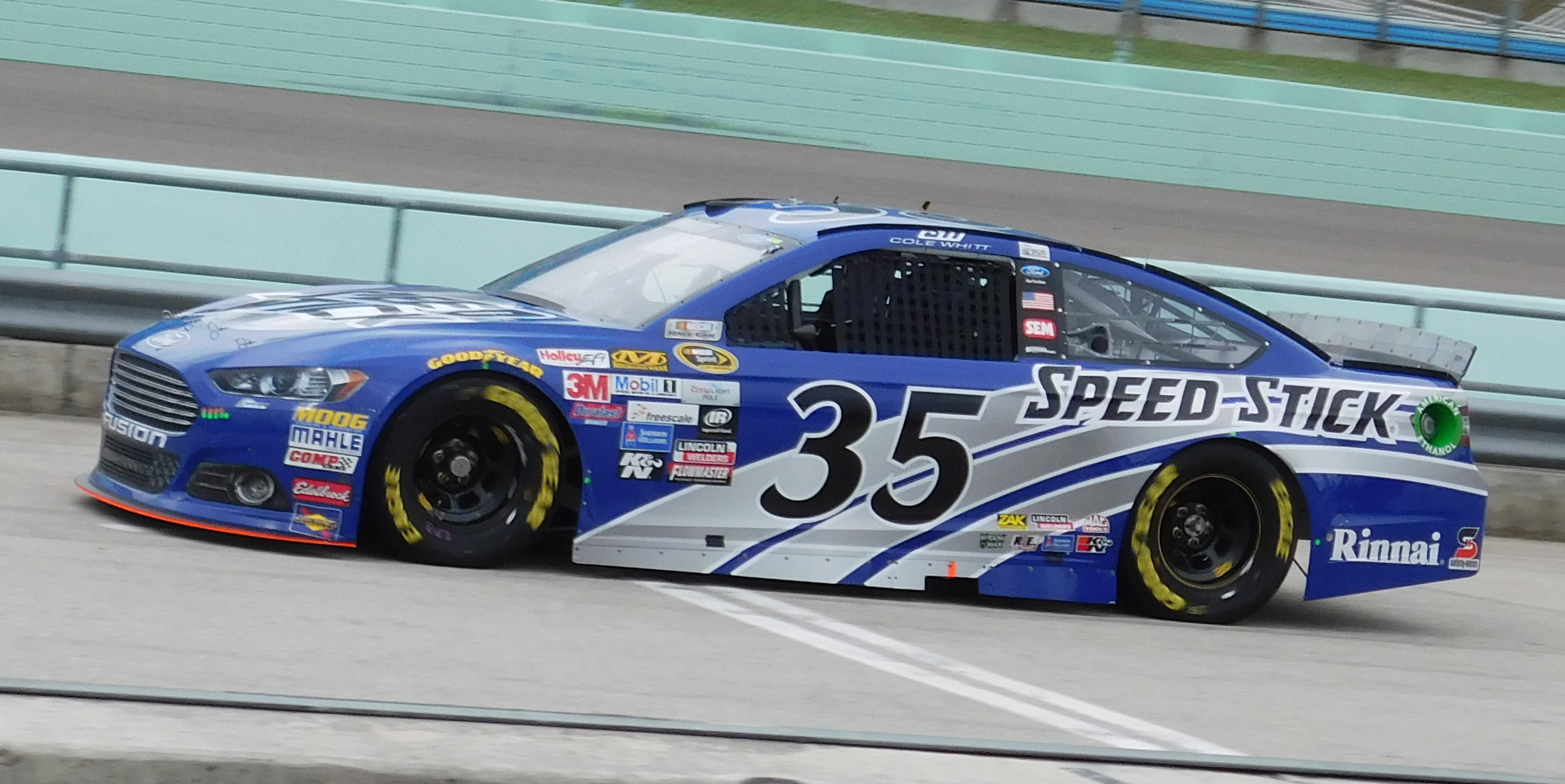
Whitt's No. 35 Front Row Motorsports car at Homestead–Miami Speedway in 2015

Later, on January 16, 2015, Front Row announced that Whitt would join the team, in the No. 35 Ford, the third full-time team car. Speed Stick GEAR, who had sponsored him for four races at Swan and seven at BK, followed him to Front Row in a ten-race deal, along with Rinnai Tankless Water Heaters for an undisclosed number of races. Whitt finished the year 31st in points for the second straight year, while improving his career best finish to thirteenth in the GEICO 500 at Talladega. FRM shut down the No. 35 car leaving Whitt with no ride in 2016.

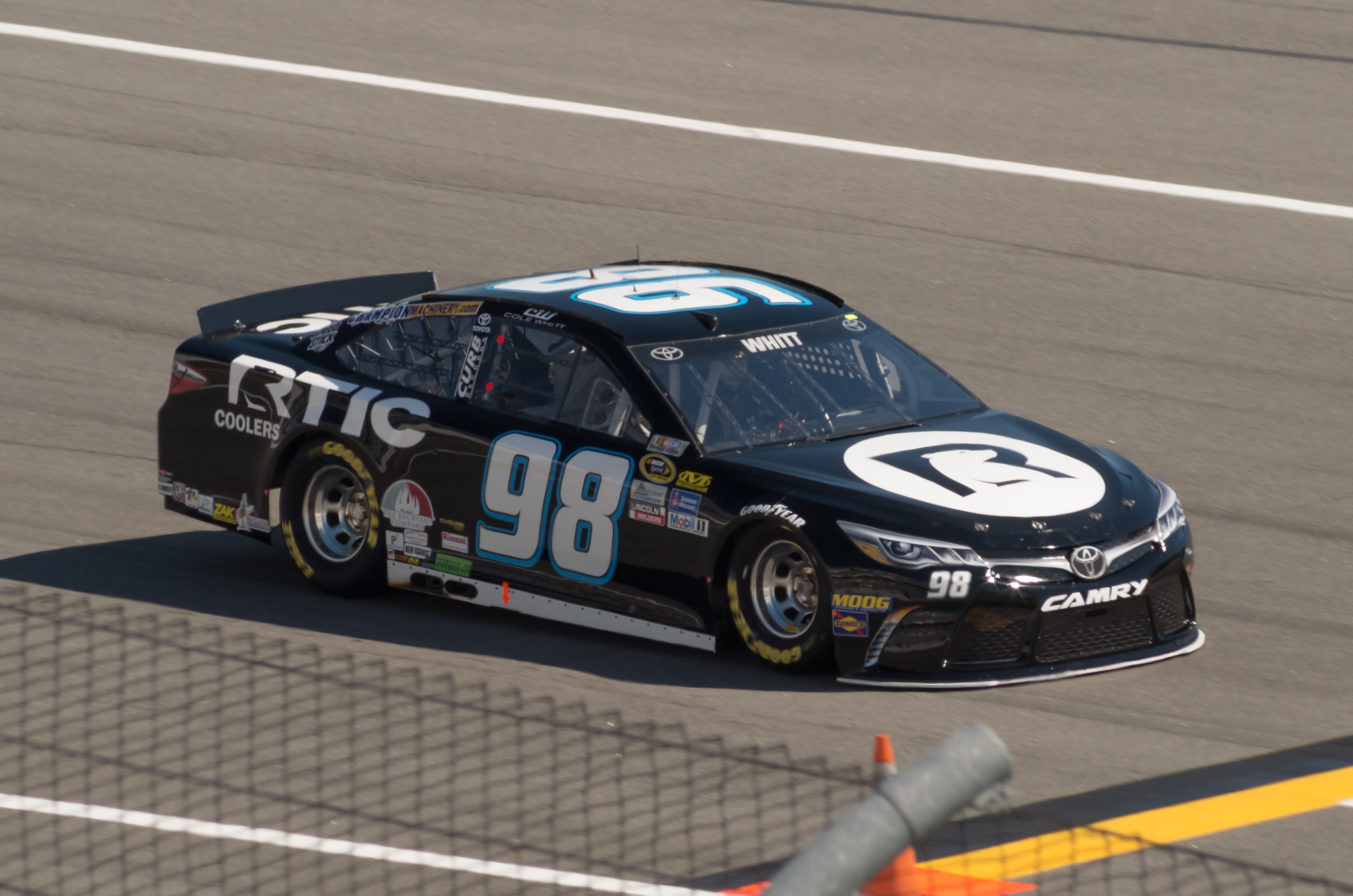
Whitt's 2016 Cup car for Premium Motorsports

Whitt moved to Premium Motorsports in 2016, driving the No. 98 with sponsorship from RTIC Coolers, Speed Stick, and Rinnai among others. While racing Michael McDowell in his Can-Am Duel race, Whitt spun and broke his transmission, which caused him to miss the Daytona 500 after qualifying the previous two years. Whitt finished a 26th place at Fontana on an unfunded team. At Talladega, Whitt avoided massive crashes contending a top-ten finish, but was involved in the last lap crash finishing a season best eighteenth. On the series' return to Daytona, Whitt was able to avoid major crash involvement and crossed the line eleventh, a new career best, and Jay Robinson's best finish as a Sprint Cup owner. During the season, Whitt also ran sporadically for TriStar Motorsports in the Xfinity Series and RBR Enterprises in the Truck Series. During the Chase for the Championship, being replaced by drivers like D. J. Kennington.

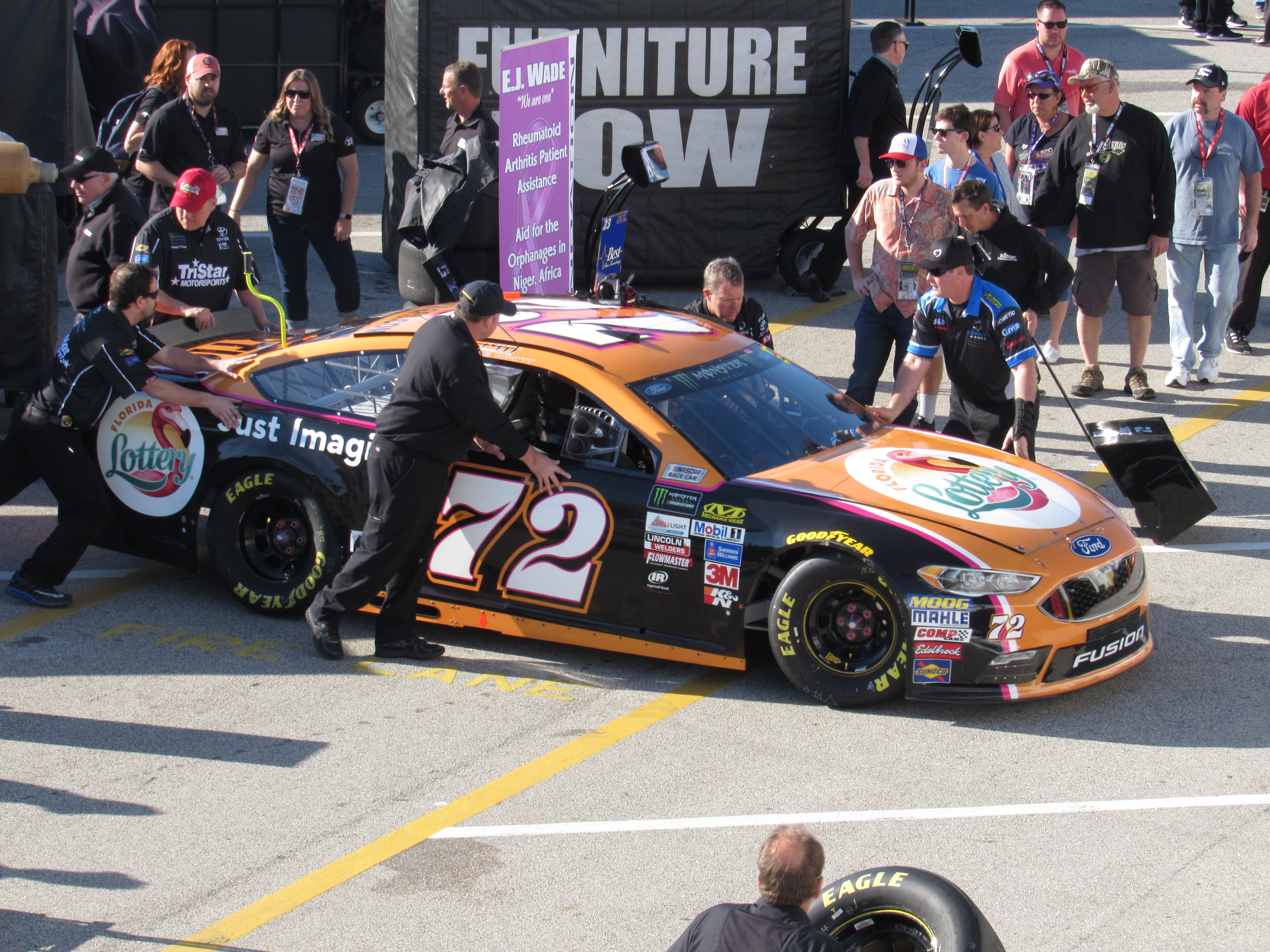
Whitt's No. 72 at Daytona in 2017

Whitt had a hand in determining the 2016 Xfinity Series champion. Late in the Ford EcoBoost 300, a caution came out. Whitt was running eighteenth in TriStar Motorsports' No. 14 entry and on the lead lap, but the team was out of tires. Whitt's crew decided to keep him out, meaning that he would restart first, alongside Chase contender Daniel Suárez. The other three Chase contenders were near Whitt; Elliott Sadler was behind Suarez while Erik Jones and Justin Allgaier were behind Whitt. On the restart, Whitt was slow on the gas, and while Suarez and Sadler sped by, Jones and Allgaier were trapped behind Whitt, who eventually fell all the way back to eighteenth in the ten laps remaining. Suarez wound up winning the championship. Jones harshly criticized Whitt after the race, calling the move "disrespectful", while Allgaier was more subdued. Whitt later apologized for the incident, saying, "It's not like you mean to do it." He also partially blamed Jones ramming him on the restart as to why he did not get up to speed.

On February 2, 2017, it was announced that Whitt would join TriStar Motorsports for the entire 2017 Monster Energy NASCAR Cup Series schedule as a chartered team, driving the No. 72 Ford Fusion. At the Daytona 500, Whitt qualified 17th, led three laps in the race's final stage, and finished 18th. Over the next four races, he recorded a best finish of 20th at Atlanta. Before Texas, TriStar struck an eight-race deal with RTIC Coolers starting at the track's O'Reilly Auto Parts 500, where Whitt finished 30th. During the race at Talladega, Whitt dodged multiple wrecks and finished a then-season-high 16th. Whitt endured various issues with his cars over the following races: at Kansas, he had multiple struggles but still finished 26th; in Charlotte's Coca-Cola 600, he had engine problems and finished 34th; two races later at Pocono, he was running 25th when the right front tire blew out, causing him to finish 30th. During the first road race of the season at Sonoma, he ran as high as thirteenth, but dropped to 21st after deciding not to pit. In the return to Daytona, he had a transmission issue on lap nine, causing the No. 72 to finish 39th, beginning a three-race string of DNFs: at Kentucky, he finished 34th; at Loudon, he blew an engine on lap 66, finishing 38th. At Indianapolis, the team was able to avoid the crashes that gobbled up several racers and keep the engine running to finish 12th. Before the Bojangles' Southern 500 at Darlington, it was announced Whitt would run his grandfather's "lime green machine" modified scheme sponsored by Ted Whitt Plumbing. He ran the car to a solid 23rd, three laps down.

Whitt's first five races of the NASCAR playoffs resulted in finishes outside the top-thirty. At Chicagoland, he ran into various problems and finished 35th, 10 laps down, followed by runs of 30th and four laps down (Loudon), 32nd and eight laps down (Dover), 34th and 42 laps down (Charlotte), and 34th and 25 laps down following a wreck with Michael McDowell (Talladega). In the return to Kansas, he ran 24th. On the final lap of Martinsville, cars stacked up in front of him, and he was pushed into Erik Jones, causing the latter to spin. He avoided the crash and finished 25th. Whitt closed the season by finishing 29th, 36th, and 28th at Texas, Phoenix, and Homestead, respectively.

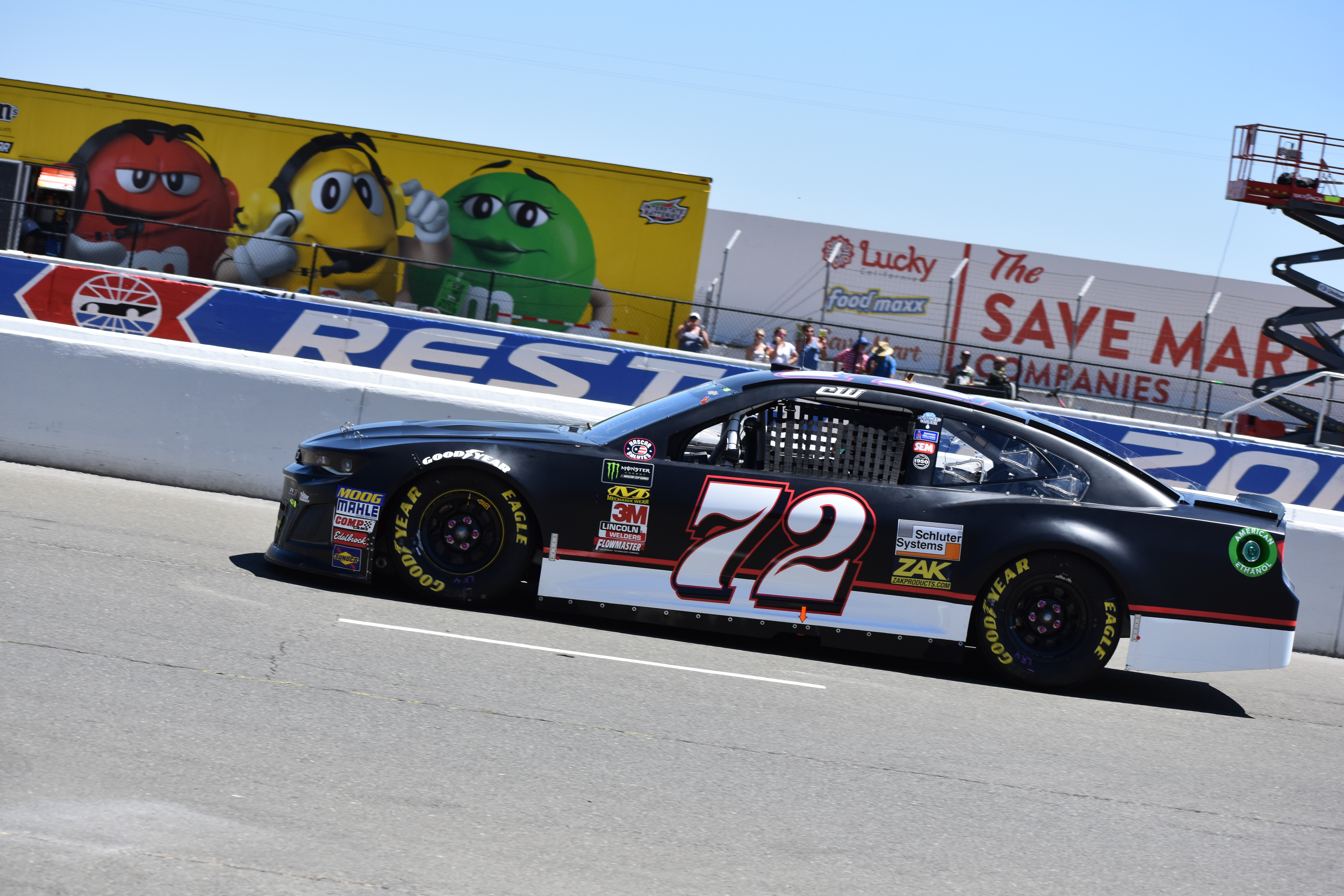
Whitt's No. 72 at Sonoma in 2018

On February 6, 2018, Whitt announced he would step back to a part-time ride in 2018 with TriStar, sharing the ride with Corey LaJoie. Whitt stated that the part time change was due to him wanting to spend more time with family. Whitt started the season in Atlanta, where he qualified 32nd and finished 28th. On November 12, TriStar Motorsports announced the 2018 Can-Am 500 at ISM Raceway was his final race in NASCAR.

=== Off-road racing ===
In 2024, Whitt began competing in desert racing with a Volkswagen Beetle built by Sletten Engineering and Isenhouer Brothers Racing. He and his Beetle finished fifth in Class 11 at the 2025 Battle at Primm.

Whitt has also used his Beetle in short course off-road racing. In 2025, he won the Class 11 World Championship at Crandon International Off-Road Raceway.

== Personal life ==
Whitt was born in San Diego but raised in Alpine, California. He is a cousin of former NASCAR driver Brandon Whitt.

== Motorsports career results ==
=== NASCAR ===
(key) (Bold – Pole position awarded by qualifying time. Italics – Pole position earned by points standings or practice time. * – Most laps led.)

==== Monster Energy Cup Series ====
Monster Energy NASCAR Cup Series results
Year	Team	No.	Make	1	2	3	4	5	6	7	8	9	10	11	12	13	14	15	16	17	18	19	20	21	22	23	24	25	26	27	28	29	30	31	32	33	34	35	36	MENCC	Pts	Ref
2011	Team Red Bull	84	Toyota	DAY	PHO	LVS	BRI	CAL	MAR	TEX	TAL	RCH	DAR	DOV	CLT	KAN	POC	MCH	INF	DAY	KEN	NHA	IND	POC	GLN	MCH	BRI	ATL	RCH	CHI	NHA	DOV	KAN	CLT	TAL	MAR	TEX	PHO; 25	HOM; 37	60th	0^{1}	
2012	Turn One Racing	74	Chevy	DAY	PHO	LVS	BRI	CAL	MAR	TEX	KAN	RCH; 40	TAL	DAR; 38	CLT; 42	DOV; DNQ	POC	MCH	SON	KEN	DAY	NHA	IND	POC	GLN	MCH	BRI	ATL	RCH											73rd	0^{1}	
2012	Circle Sport	33	Chevy																											CHI; 37	NHA	DOV; DNQ	TAL; 40	CLT; DNQ	KAN; DNQ	MAR	TEX	PHO	HOM	73rd	0^{1}	
2013	Swan Racing Company	30	Toyota	DAY	PHO	LVS	BRI	CAL	MAR	TEX	KAN	RCH	TAL	DAR	CLT	DOV	POC	MCH	SON	KEN	DAY	NHA	IND	POC	GLN	MCH	BRI	ATL	RCH	CHI; 39	NHA	DOV; 27	KAN; 31	CLT; 34	TAL; 31	MAR; 35	TEX	PHO; 40	HOM	65th	0^{1}	
2014	Swan Racing	26	Toyota	DAY; 28	PHO; 27	LVS; 36	BRI; 40	CAL; 18	MAR; 29	TEX; 31	DAR; 38																													31st	532	
2014	BK Racing	26	Toyota									RCH; 41	TAL; 21	KAN; 28	CLT; 27	DOV; 27	POC; 30	MCH; 28	SON; 27	KEN; 28	DAY; 34	NHA; 28	IND; 32	POC; 21	GLN; 43	MCH; 25	BRI; 30	ATL; 30	RCH; 30	CHI; 30	NHA; 38	DOV; 30	KAN; 23	CLT; 28	TAL; 15	MAR; 18	TEX; 26	PHO; 42	HOM; 26	31st	532	
2015	Front Row Motorsports	35	Ford	DAY; 22	ATL; 37	LVS; 32	PHO; 25	CAL; 24	MAR; 22	TEX; 35	BRI; 27	RCH; 36	TAL; 13	KAN; 35	CLT; 28	DOV; 26	POC; 28	MCH; 32	SON; 22	DAY; 25	KEN; 37	NHA; 28	IND; 33	POC; 27	GLN; 21	MCH; 27	BRI; 29	DAR; 43	RCH; 38	CHI; 29	NHA; 24	DOV; 28	CLT; 38	KAN; 33	TAL; 22	MAR; 20	TEX; 27	PHO; 33	HOM; 28	31st	553	
2016	Premium Motorsports	98	Toyota	DAY; DNQ									TAL; 18						SON; 34	DAY; 11					GLN; 28															37th	276	
2016	Premium Motorsports	98	Chevy		ATL; 37	LVS; 39	PHO; 36	CAL; 26	MAR; 30	TEX; 30	BRI; 28	RCH; DNQ		KAN; 39	DOV; 27	CLT; 35					KEN; 21	NHA	IND; 29	POC; 31		BRI; 34	MCH; 34	DAR; 37	RCH; DNQ	CHI; 36	NHA; 35	DOV	CLT; 27		TAL; Wth	MAR; Wth	TEX; Wth	PHO	HOM	37th	276	
2016	Premium Motorsports	55	Chevy														POC; 30	MCH; 27																KAN; 33						37th	276	
2017	TriStar Motorsports	72	Ford	DAY; 18																																				33rd	322	
2017	TriStar Motorsports	72	Chevy		ATL; 20	LVS; 28	PHO; 34	CAL; 32	MAR; 21	TEX; 30	BRI; 21	RCH; 27	TAL; 16	KAN; 26	CLT; 34	DOV; 22	POC; 30	MCH; 31	SON; 21	DAY; 39	KEN; 34	NHA; 38	IND; 12	POC; 24	GLN; 34	MCH; 29	BRI; 33	DAR; 23	RCH; 33	CHI; 35	NHA; 30	DOV; 32	CLT; 34	TAL; 34	KAN; 24	MAR; 25	TEX; 29	PHO; 36	HOM; 28	33rd	322	
2018	TriStar Motorsports	72	Chevy	DAY	ATL; 28	LVS; 28	PHO	CAL; 28	MAR; 27	TEX; 19	BRI	RCH; 30	TAL; 21	DOV	KAN	CLT	POC; 30	MCH	SON; 35	CHI	DAY	KEN	NHA	POC	GLN; 34	MCH	BRI	DAR	IND	LVS	RCH	ROV; 20	DOV	TAL	KAN	MAR; 24	TEX	PHO; 25	HOM	35th	132	

===== Daytona 500 =====
Year	Team	Manufacturer	Start	Finish
2014	Swan Racing	Toyota	23	28
2015	Front Row Motorsports	Ford	19	22
2016	Premium Motorsports	Toyota	DNQ	
2017	TriStar Motorsports	Ford	17	18

==== Xfinity Series ====
NASCAR Xfinity Series results
Year	Team	No.	Make	1	2	3	4	5	6	7	8	9	10	11	12	13	14	15	16	17	18	19	20	21	22	23	24	25	26	27	28	29	30	31	32	33	34	35	NXSC	Pts	Ref
2010	Team Red Bull	84	Toyota	DAY	CAL	LVS	BRI	NSH	PHO	TEX	TAL	RCH	DAR	DOV	CLT	NSH	KEN	ROA	NHA	DAY	CHI	GTY	IRP	IOW	GLN	MCH	BRI	CGV	ATL	RCH	DOV	KAN	CAL	CLT	GTY	TEX	PHO; 15	HOM; 17	107th	118	
2011	Pastrana-Waltrip Racing	99	Toyota	DAY	PHO	LVS	BRI	CAL	TEX	TAL	NSH	RCH	DAR	DOV	IOW	CLT; 15	CHI	MCH	ROA	DAY	KEN	NHA	NSH	IRP	IOW	GLN	CGV	BRI	ATL	RCH	CHI	DOV	KAN	CLT	TEX	PHO	HOM		118th^{1}	0^{1}	
2012	JR Motorsports	88	Chevy	DAY; 4	PHO; 13	LVS; 6	BRI; 16	CAL; 30	TEX; 13	RCH; 19	TAL; 4	DAR; 10	IOW; 7	CLT; 28	DOV; 14	MCH; 4	ROA; 9	KEN; 14	DAY; 29	NHA; 18	CHI; 9	IND; 17	IOW; 19	GLN; 24	CGV; 33	BRI; 6	ATL; 8	RCH; 14	CHI; 14	KEN; 6	DOV; 6	CLT; 13	KAN; 5	TEX; 12	PHO; 29	HOM; 10			7th	994	
2013	TriStar Motorsports	44	Toyota	DAY	PHO	LVS	BRI	CAL	TEX	RCH	TAL	DAR	CLT	DOV; 16	IOW; 16	MCH; 15	ROA; 8	KEN; 31	DAY; 16	NHA	CHI	IND; 17	IOW; 20	GLN; 8	MOH		ATL; 20	RCH	CHI	KEN; 9	DOV; 16	KAN	CLT	TEX; 20	PHO	HOM; 9			21st	426	
2013	TriStar Motorsports	10	Toyota																							BRI; 14													21st	426	
2016	TriStar Motorsports	14	Toyota	DAY	ATL	LVS	PHO	CAL	TEX	BRI	RCH	TAL	DOV	CLT	POC	MCH	IOW	DAY	KEN	NHA	IND	IOW	GLN	MOH	BRI	ROA	DAR	RCH	CHI	KEN	DOV	CLT	KAN	TEX	PHO; 16	HOM; 18			110th	0^{1}	

==== Camping World Truck Series ====
NASCAR Camping World Truck Series results
Year	Team	No.	Make	1	2	3	4	5	6	7	8	9	10	11	12	13	14	15	16	17	18	19	20	21	22	23	24	25	NCWTC	Pts	Ref
2010	Turn One Racing	60	Chevy	DAY	ATL	MAR	NSH	KAN	DOV	CLT	TEX	MCH	IOW	GTY	IRP	POC	NSH	DAR	BRI	CHI	KEN	NHA	LVS	MAR	TAL	TEX	PHO	HOM; 28	107th	79	
2011	Turn One Racing	60	Chevy	DAY; DNQ	PHO; 6	**DAR**; 8	MAR; 6	NSH; 12	DOV; 2	CLT; 3	KAN; 15	TEX; 28	KEN; 26	IOW; 6	NSH; 19	IRP; 8	POC; 15	MCH; 10	BRI; 12	ATL; 32	CHI; 9	NHA; 15	KEN; 8	LVS; 8	TAL; 14	MAR; 27	TEX; 17	HOM; 22	9th	764	
2011	RSS Racing	93	Chevy	DAY; 14																									9th	764	
2012	Hillman Racing	27	Chevy	DAY	MAR	CAR	KAN	CLT	DOV	TEX	KEN	IOW	CHI	POC	MCH	BRI	ATL	IOW	KEN	LVS	TAL; 13	MAR	TEX	PHO	HOM				91st	0^{1}	
2016	RBR Enterprises	92	Ford	DAY	ATL	MAR	KAN	DOV	CLT	TEX	IOW	GTW	KEN	ELD	POC	BRI	MCH	MSP	CHI	NHA	LVS	TAL	MAR; 12	TEX	PHO	HOM			91st	0	

==== K&N Pro Series East ====
NASCAR K&N Pro Series East results
Year	Team	No.	Make	1	2	3	4	5	6	7	8	9	10	NKNPSEC	Pts	Ref
2010	Team Red Bull	84	Toyota	**GRE**; 3	SBO; 2	**IOW**; 22	MAR; 9	NHA; 26	LRP; 2	LEE; 5	JFC; 2	NHA; 5	DOV; 26	4th	1420	

^{*} Season still in progress
^{1} Ineligible for series points
