= 2017 Pure Michigan 400 =

Race details
- Race 23 of 36 in the 2017 Monster Energy NASCAR Cup Series
- The 2017 Pure Michigan 400 program cover, featuring Kyle Larson.
- Date: August 13, 2017
- Location: Michigan International Speedway in Brooklyn, Michigan
- Course: Permanent racing facility
- Course length: 2 miles (3.219 km)
- Distance: 202 laps, 404 mi (650.175 km)
- Scheduled distance: 200 laps, 400 mi (643.738 km)
- Average speed: 150.903 miles per hour (242.855 km/h)

Pole position
Driver	Brad Keselowski	Team Penske
- Time: 35.451

Most laps led
Driver	Brad Keselowski	Team Penske
- Laps: 105

Winner
No. 42	Kyle Larson	Chip Ganassi Racing

Television in the United States
- Network: NBCSN
- Announcers: Leigh Diffey, Jeff Burton and Steve Letarte

Radio in the United States
- Radio: MRN
- Booth announcers: Joe Moore, Jeff Striegle and Rusty Wallace
- Turn announcers: Dave Moody (1 & 2) and Kurt Becker (3 & 4)

The 2017 Pure Michigan 400, was a Monster Energy NASCAR Cup Series race held on August 13, 2017 at Michigan International Speedway in Brooklyn, Michigan. Contested over 202 laps, extended from 200 laps due to an overtime finish, on the 2-mile (3.2-kilometre) D-shaped oval, it was the 23rd race of the 2017 Monster Energy NASCAR Cup Series season.

Chip Ganassi Racing driver Kyle Larson won his third race of the season, and his third consecutive start in the Cup Series at Michigan International Speedway, moving ahead of erstwhile race leader Martin Truex Jr. on the final restart in overtime.

== Entry list ==
No.	Driver	Team	Manufacturer
1	Jamie McMurray	Chip Ganassi Racing	Chevrolet
2	Brad Keselowski	Team Penske	Ford
3	Austin Dillon	Richard Childress Racing	Chevrolet
4	Kevin Harvick	Stewart–Haas Racing	Ford
5	Kasey Kahne	Hendrick Motorsports	Chevrolet
6	Trevor Bayne	Roush Fenway Racing	Ford
10	Danica Patrick	Stewart–Haas Racing	Ford
11	Denny Hamlin	Joe Gibbs Racing	Toyota
13	Ty Dillon (R)	Germain Racing	Chevrolet
14	Clint Bowyer	Stewart–Haas Racing	Ford
15	Derrike Cope	Premium Motorsports	Toyota
17	Ricky Stenhouse Jr.	Roush Fenway Racing	Ford
18	Kyle Busch	Joe Gibbs Racing	Toyota
19	Daniel Suárez (R)	Joe Gibbs Racing	Toyota
20	Matt Kenseth	Joe Gibbs Racing	Toyota
21	Ryan Blaney	Wood Brothers Racing	Ford
22	Joey Logano	Team Penske	Ford
23	Corey LaJoie (R)	BK Racing	Toyota
24	Chase Elliott	Hendrick Motorsports	Chevrolet
27	Paul Menard	Richard Childress Racing	Chevrolet
31	Ryan Newman	Richard Childress Racing	Chevrolet
32	Matt DiBenedetto	Go Fas Racing	Ford
33	Jeffrey Earnhardt	Circle Sport – The Motorsports Group	Chevrolet
34	Landon Cassill	Front Row Motorsports	Ford
37	Chris Buescher	JTG Daugherty Racing	Chevrolet
38	David Ragan	Front Row Motorsports	Ford
41	Kurt Busch	Stewart–Haas Racing	Ford
42	Kyle Larson	Chip Ganassi Racing	Chevrolet
43	Aric Almirola	Richard Petty Motorsports	Ford
47	A. J. Allmendinger	JTG Daugherty Racing	Chevrolet
48	Jimmie Johnson	Hendrick Motorsports	Chevrolet
51	B. J. McLeod (i)	Rick Ware Racing	Chevrolet
55	Reed Sorenson	Premium Motorsports	Chevrolet
72	Cole Whitt	TriStar Motorsports	Chevrolet
77	Erik Jones (R)	Furniture Row Racing	Toyota
78	Martin Truex Jr.	Furniture Row Racing	Toyota
83	Brett Moffitt (i)	BK Racing	Toyota
88	Dale Earnhardt Jr.	Hendrick Motorsports	Chevrolet
95	Michael McDowell	Leavine Family Racing	Chevrolet
Official entry list

== First practice ==
Ryan Blaney was the fastest in the first practice session with a time of 35.365 seconds and a speed of 203.591 mph (327.648 km/h).

Pos	No.	Driver	Team	Manufacturer	Time	Speed
1	21	Ryan Blaney	Wood Brothers Racing	Ford	35.365	203.591
2	18	Kyle Busch	Joe Gibbs Racing	Toyota	35.586	202.327
3	11	Denny Hamlin	Joe Gibbs Racing	Toyota	35.655	201.935
Official first practice results

== Qualifying ==
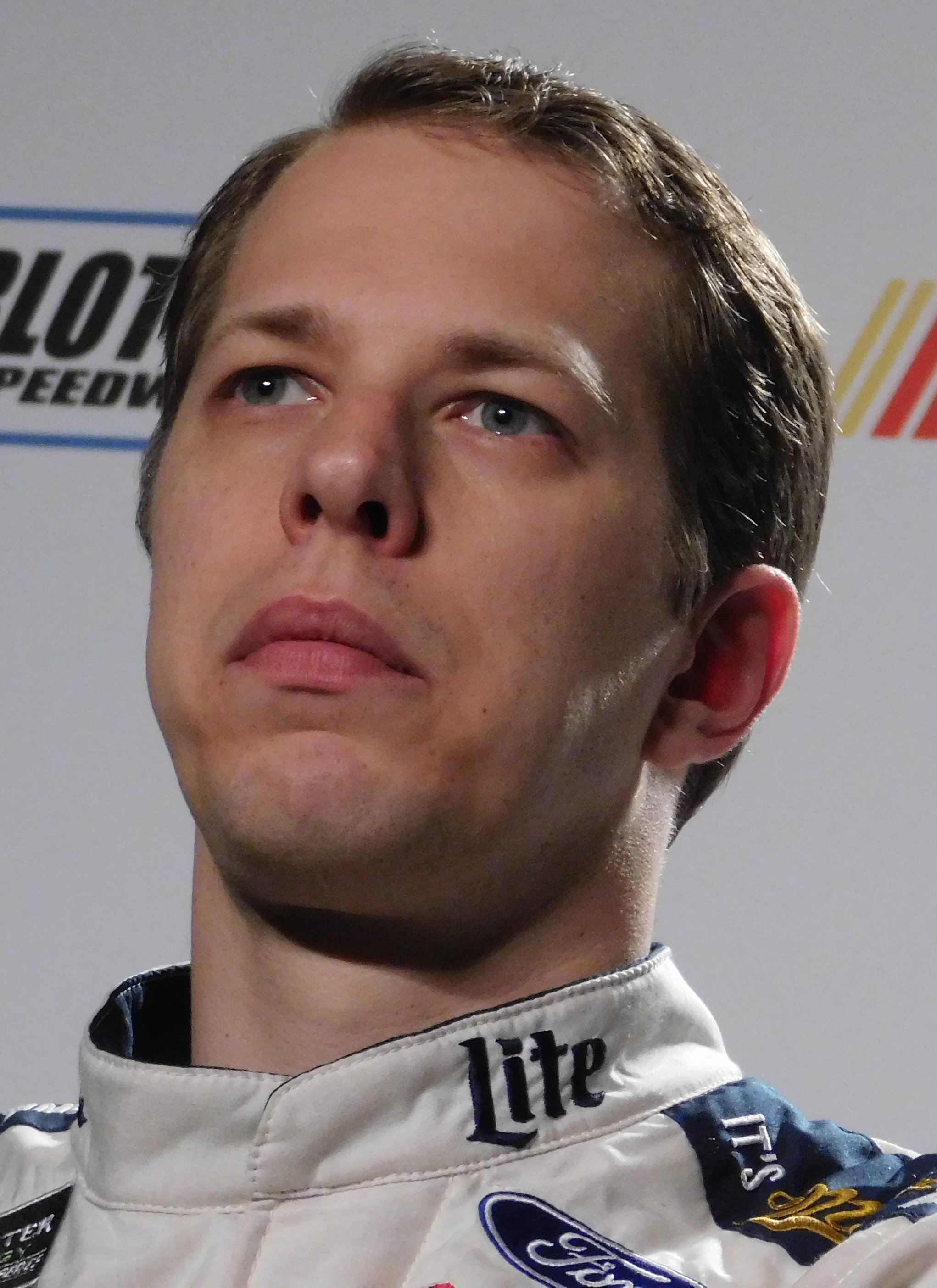
Brad Keselowski won the pole position.

Brad Keselowski scored the pole for the race with a time of 35.451 and a speed of 203.097 mph (326.853 km/h).

=== Qualifying results ===
Pos	No.	Driver	Team	Manufacturer	R1	R2	R3
1	2	Brad Keselowski	Team Penske	Ford	36.201	35.456	35.451
2	22	Joey Logano	Team Penske	Ford	35.959	35.590	35.457
3	4	Kevin Harvick	Stewart–Haas Racing	Ford	35.948	35.525	35.505
4	20	Matt Kenseth	Joe Gibbs Racing	Toyota	36.157	35.722	35.542
5	24	Chase Elliott	Hendrick Motorsports	Chevrolet	35.769	35.592	35.568
6	18	Kyle Busch	Joe Gibbs Racing	Toyota	36.039	35.649	35.644
7	1	Jamie McMurray	Chip Ganassi Racing	Chevrolet	36.215	35.688	35.664
8	77	Erik Jones (R)	Furniture Row Racing	Toyota	35.957	35.609	35.678
9	42	Kyle Larson	Chip Ganassi Racing	Chevrolet	35.808	35.543	35.685
10	11	Denny Hamlin	Joe Gibbs Racing	Toyota	36.029	35.613	35.697
11	14	Clint Bowyer	Stewart–Haas Racing	Ford	36.169	35.728	35.714
12	21	Ryan Blaney	Wood Brothers Racing	Ford	35.699	35.447	35.779
13	78	Martin Truex Jr.	Furniture Row Racing	Toyota	36.005	35.774	—
14	17	Ricky Stenhouse Jr.	Roush Fenway Racing	Ford	35.971	35.849	—
15	41	Kurt Busch	Stewart–Haas Racing	Ford	36.226	35.891	—
16	19	Daniel Suárez (R)	Joe Gibbs Racing	Toyota	36.264	35.916	—
17	3	Austin Dillon	Richard Childress Racing	Chevrolet	36.307	35.945	—
18	10	Danica Patrick	Stewart–Haas Racing	Ford	36.319	35.954	—
19	88	Dale Earnhardt Jr.	Hendrick Motorsports	Chevrolet	36.325	35.968	—
20	37	Chris Buescher	JTG Daugherty Racing	Chevrolet	36.242	36.081	—
21	6	Trevor Bayne	Roush Fenway Racing	Ford	36.302	36.115	—
22	48	Jimmie Johnson	Hendrick Motorsports	Chevrolet	36.156	36.122	—
23	5	Kasey Kahne	Hendrick Motorsports	Chevrolet	36.131	36.126	—
24	43	Aric Almirola	Richard Petty Motorsports	Ford	36.347	36.243	—
25	31	Ryan Newman	Richard Childress Racing	Chevrolet	36.408	—	—
26	95	Michael McDowell	Leavine Family Racing	Chevrolet	36.438	—	—
27	32	Matt DiBenedetto	Go Fas Racing	Ford	36.465	—	—
28	38	David Ragan	Front Row Motorsports	Ford	36.550	—	—
29	47	A. J. Allmendinger	JTG Daugherty Racing	Chevrolet	36.617	—	—
30	27	Paul Menard	Richard Childress Racing	Chevrolet	36.761	—	—
31	72	Cole Whitt	TriStar Motorsports	Chevrolet	36.892	—	—
32	34	Landon Cassill	Front Row Motorsports	Ford	36.901	—	—
33	13	Ty Dillon (R)	Germain Racing	Chevrolet	36.965	—	—
34	23	Corey LaJoie (R)	BK Racing	Toyota	37.015	—	—
35	83	Brett Moffitt (i)	BK Racing	Toyota	37.070	—	—
36	33	Jeffrey Earnhardt	Circle Sport – The Motorsports Group	Chevrolet	37.810	—	—
37	15	Derrike Cope	Premium Motorsports	Toyota	38.271	—	—
38	55	Reed Sorenson	Premium Motorsports	Chevrolet	38.468	—	—
39	51	B. J. McLeod (i)	Rick Ware Racing	Chevrolet	38.710	—	—
Official qualifying results

== Practice (post-qualifying) ==
=== Second practice ===
Kyle Larson was the fastest in the second practice session with a time of 35.550 seconds and a speed of 203.591 mph (327.648 km/h).

Pos	No.	Driver	Team	Manufacturer	Time	Speed
1	42	Kyle Larson	Chip Ganassi Racing	Chevrolet	35.550	202.532
2	2	Brad Keselowski	Team Penske	Ford	35.585	202.332
3	48	Jimmie Johnson	Hendrick Motorsports	Chevrolet	35.589	202.310
Official second practice results

=== Final practice ===
Brad Keselowski was the fastest in the final practice session with a time of 35.845 seconds and a speed of 200.865 mph (323.261 km/h).

Pos	No.	Driver	Team	Manufacturer	Time	Speed
1	2	Brad Keselowski	Team Penske	Ford	35.845	200.865
2	78	Martin Truex Jr.	Furniture Row Racing	Toyota	35.969	200.172
3	22	Joey Logano	Team Penske	Ford	36.048	199.734
Official final practice results

== Race ==
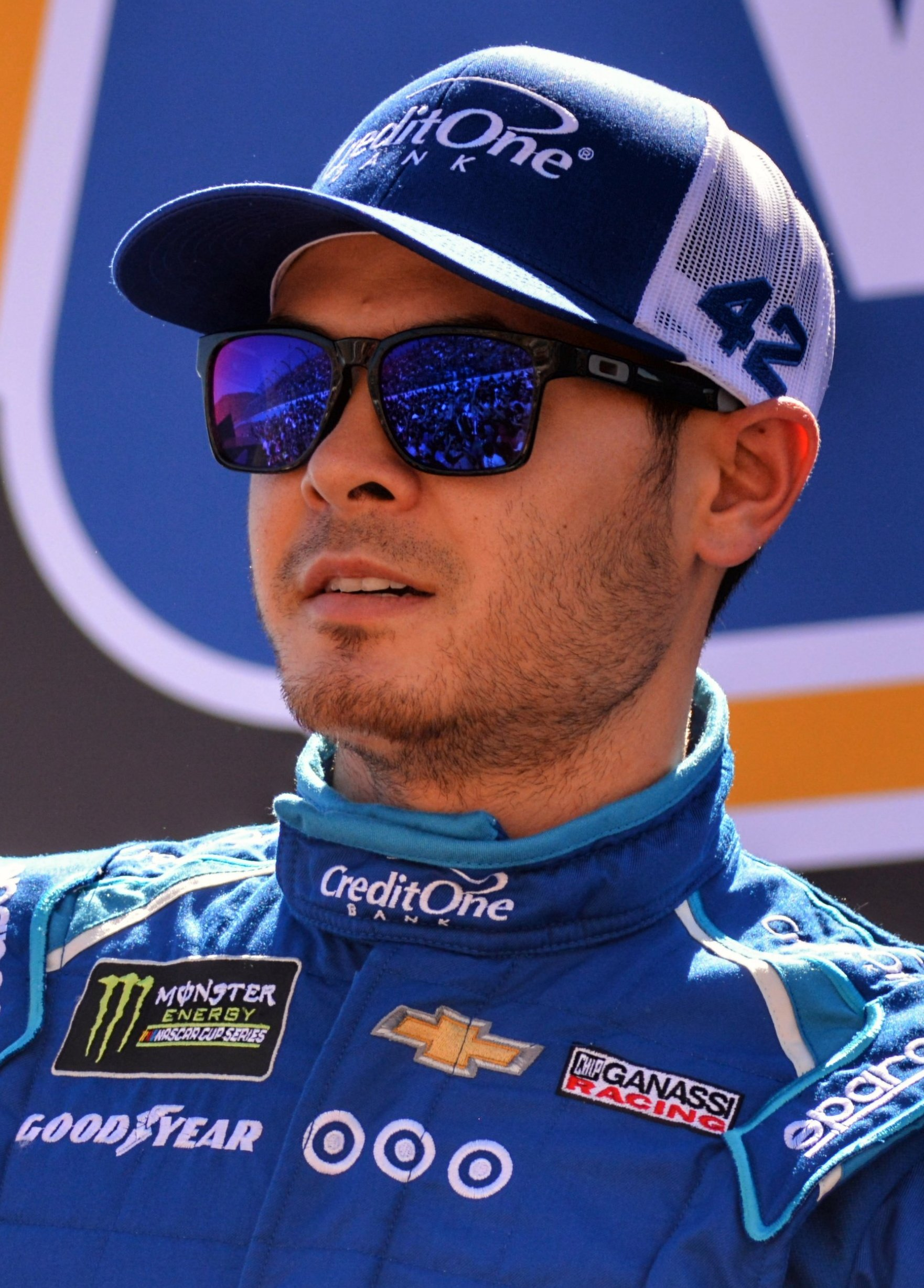
Kyle Larson won the race.

A red flag happened late in the race with 4 laps remaining of the original race distance and the race restarted in overtime with 2 laps to go. Kyle Larson scored his fourth career victory and third win in a row at Michigan.

== Race results ==
=== Stage results ===
Stage 1 Laps: 60

Pos	No	Driver	Team	Manufacturer	Points
1	2	Brad Keselowski	Team Penske	Ford	10
2	4	Kevin Harvick	Stewart–Haas Racing	Ford	9
3	24	Chase Elliott	Hendrick Motorsports	Chevrolet	8
4	78	Martin Truex Jr.	Furniture Row Racing	Toyota	7
5	77	Erik Jones (R)	Furniture Row Racing	Toyota	6
6	22	Joey Logano	Team Penske	Ford	5
7	20	Matt Kenseth	Joe Gibbs Racing	Toyota	4
8	18	Kyle Busch	Joe Gibbs Racing	Toyota	3
9	42	Kyle Larson	Chip Ganassi Racing	Chevrolet	2
10	11	Denny Hamlin	Joe Gibbs Racing	Toyota	1
Official stage one results

Stage 2 Laps: 60

Pos	No	Driver	Team	Manufacturer	Points
1	78	Martin Truex Jr.	Furniture Row Racing	Toyota	10
2	2	Brad Keselowski	Team Penske	Ford	9
3	4	Kevin Harvick	Stewart–Haas Racing	Ford	8
4	77	Erik Jones (R)	Furniture Row Racing	Toyota	7
5	19	Daniel Suárez (R)	Joe Gibbs Racing	Toyota	6
6	21	Ryan Blaney	Wood Brothers Racing	Ford	5
7	1	Jamie McMurray	Chip Ganassi Racing	Chevrolet	4
8	42	Kyle Larson	Chip Ganassi Racing	Chevrolet	3
9	18	Kyle Busch	Joe Gibbs Racing	Toyota	2
10	11	Denny Hamlin	Joe Gibbs Racing	Toyota	1
Official stage two results

=== Final stage results ===
Stage 3 Laps: 82

Pos	Grid	No	Driver	Team	Manufacturer	Laps	Points
1	9	42	Kyle Larson	Chip Ganassi Racing	Chevrolet	202	45
2	13	78	Martin Truex Jr.	Furniture Row Racing	Toyota	202	52
3	8	77	Erik Jones (R)	Furniture Row Racing	Toyota	202	47
4	25	31	Ryan Newman	Richard Childress Racing	Chevrolet	202	33
5	21	6	Trevor Bayne	Roush Fenway Racing	Ford	202	32
6	20	37	Chris Buescher	JTG Daugherty Racing	Chevrolet	202	31
7	17	3	Austin Dillon	Richard Childress Racing	Chevrolet	202	30
8	5	24	Chase Elliott	Hendrick Motorsports	Chevrolet	202	37
9	7	1	Jamie McMurray	Chip Ganassi Racing	Chevrolet	202	32
10	6	18	Kyle Busch	Joe Gibbs Racing	Toyota	202	32
11	15	41	Kurt Busch	Stewart–Haas Racing	Ford	202	26
12	24	43	Aric Almirola	Richard Petty Motorsports	Ford	202	25
13	3	4	Kevin Harvick	Stewart–Haas Racing	Ford	202	41
14	19	88	Dale Earnhardt Jr.	Hendrick Motorsports	Chevrolet	202	23
15	12	21	Ryan Blaney	Wood Brothers Racing	Ford	202	27
16	10	11	Denny Hamlin	Joe Gibbs Racing	Toyota	202	23
17	1	2	Brad Keselowski	Team Penske	Ford	202	39
18	14	17	Ricky Stenhouse Jr.	Roush Fenway Racing	Ford	202	19
19	22	48	Jimmie Johnson	Hendrick Motorsports	Chevrolet	202	18
20	29	47	A. J. Allmendinger	JTG Daugherty Racing	Chevrolet	202	17
21	33	13	Ty Dillon (R)	Germain Racing	Chevrolet	202	16
22	18	10	Danica Patrick	Stewart–Haas Racing	Ford	202	15
23	11	14	Clint Bowyer	Stewart–Haas Racing	Ford	202	14
24	4	20	Matt Kenseth	Joe Gibbs Racing	Toyota	202	17
25	32	34	Landon Cassill	Front Row Motorsports	Ford	200	12
26	27	32	Matt DiBenedetto	Go Fas Racing	Ford	200	11
27	26	95	Michael McDowell	Leavine Family Racing	Chevrolet	200	10
28	2	22	Joey Logano	Team Penske	Ford	200	14
29	31	72	Cole Whitt	TriStar Motorsports	Chevrolet	199	8
30	28	38	David Ragan	Front Row Motorsports	Ford	199	7
31	34	23	Corey LaJoie (R)	BK Racing	Toyota	199	6
32	35	83	Brett Moffitt (i)	BK Racing	Toyota	198	0
33	38	55	Reed Sorenson	Premium Motorsports	Chevrolet	197	4
34	30	27	Paul Menard	Richard Childress Racing	Chevrolet	196	3
35	36	33	Jeffrey Earnhardt	Circle Sport – The Motorsports Group	Chevrolet	196	2
36	39	51	B. J. McLeod (i)	Rick Ware Racing	Chevrolet	178	0
37	16	19	Daniel Suárez (R)	Joe Gibbs Racing	Toyota	138	7
38	23	5	Kasey Kahne	Hendrick Motorsports	Chevrolet	138	1
39	37	15	Derrike Cope	Premium Motorsports	Toyota	107	1
Official race results

=== Race statistics ===
- Lead changes: 14 among 7 different drivers
- Cautions/Laps: 5 for 28 laps
- Red flags: 1 for 5 minutes and 39 seconds
- Time of race: 2 hours, 40 minutes and 38 seconds
- Average speed: 150.903 miles per hour (242.855 km/h)

== Media ==
=== Television ===
NBC Sports covered the race on the television side. As regular lead announcer Rick Allen was covering the IAAF World Championships in Athletics in London, England, the network's Formula One and IndyCar Series announcer Leigh Diffey replaced him. Diffey was joined in the broadcast booth by Jeff Burton and Steve Letarte, while Dave Burns, Marty Snider and Kelli Stavast reported from pit lane.

NBCSN
Booth announcers	Pit reporters
Lap-by-lap: Leigh Diffey; Color commentator: Jeff Burton; Color commentator: Steve Letarte	Dave Burns; Marty Snider; Kelli Stavast

=== Radio ===
Motor Racing Network had the radio call for the race, which was simulcast on SiriusXM's NASCAR Radio channel.

MRN
Booth announcers	Turn announcers	Pit reporters
Lead announcer: Joe Moore; Announcer: Jeff Striegle; Announcer: Rusty Wallace	Turns 1 & 2: Dave Moody; Turns 3 & 4: Kurt Becker	Alex Hayden; Winston Kelley; Kim Coon; Steve Post

== Standings after the race ==
Drivers' Championship standings

	Pos	Driver	Points
	1	Martin Truex Jr.	933
1	2	Kyle Larson	804 (–129)
1	3	Kyle Busch	797 (–136)
	4	Kevin Harvick	787 (–146)
1	5	Brad Keselowski	720 (–213)
1	6	Denny Hamlin	710 (–223)
	7	Chase Elliott	685 (–248)
	8	Jamie McMurray	675 (–258)
	9	Matt Kenseth	654 (–279)
	10	Clint Bowyer	623 (–310)
	11	Jimmie Johnson	592 (–341)
	12	Ryan Blaney	592 (–341)
	13	Joey Logano	556 (–377)
	14	Kurt Busch	554 (–379)
1	15	Ryan Newman	536 (–397)
2	16	Erik Jones	524 (–409)
Official driver's standings

Manufacturers' Championship standings

	Pos	Manufacturer	Points
1	1	Chevrolet	814
1	2	Ford	808 (–6)
	3	Toyota	799 (–15)
Official manufacturers' standings

- Note: Only the first 16 positions are included for the driver standings.
- . – Driver has clinched a position in the Monster Energy NASCAR Cup Series playoffs.

Previous race: 2017 I Love New York 355 at The Glen	Monster Energy NASCAR Cup Series; 2017 season	Next race: 2017 Bass Pro Shops NRA Night Race
