= 2016 FireKeepers Casino 400 =

Race details
- Race 15 of 36 in the 2016 NASCAR Sprint Cup Series
- Date: June 12, 2016
- Location: Michigan International Speedway in Brooklyn, Michigan
- Course: Permanent racing facility
- Course length: 2.0 miles (3.2 km)
- Distance: 200 laps, 400 mi (640 km)
- Weather: Mostly sunny skies with a temperature of 72 °F (22 °C); wind out of the northeast at 10 mph (16 km/h)
- Average speed: 134.241 mph (216.040 km/h)

Pole position
Driver	Joey Logano	Team Penske
- Time: 36.080 seconds

Most laps led
Driver	Joey Logano	Team Penske
- Laps: 138

Winner
No. 22	Joey Logano	Team Penske

Television in the United States
- Network: FS1
- Announcers: Mike Joy, Jeff Gordon and Darrell Waltrip

Radio in the United States
- Radio: MRN
- Booth announcers: Joe Moore, Jeff Striegle and Rusty Wallace
- Turn announcers: Dave Moody (1–2) and Mike Bagley (3–4)

The 2016 FireKeepers Casino 400 was a NASCAR Sprint Cup Series stock car race held on June 12, 2016, at Michigan International Speedway in Brooklyn, Michigan. Contested over 200 laps on the two-mile (3.2 km) D-shaped oval, it was the fifteenth race of the 2016 NASCAR Sprint Cup Series.

The race had 14 lead changes among different drivers and nine cautions for 46 laps.

== Background ==
The race was held at Michigan International Speedway, a two-mile (3.2 km) moderate-banked D-shaped speedway located in Brooklyn, Michigan. Entering the race, Kevin Harvick leads the points with 490, while Kurt Busch is 25 points back, Brad Keselowski is 48 points back, Carl Edwards is 53 points back, and Kyle Busch is 74 points back.

Harvick, Kurt Busch, Keselowski, Edwards, Kyle Busch, Jimmie Johnson, Martin Truex Jr., Matt Kenseth, and Denny Hamlin have already clinched a Chase position.

=== Aero package ===
Two weeks prior to the race, NASCAR announced they will test changes to the aero package. In addition to the aero changes used in the 2016 NASCAR Sprint All-Star Race, there will be a reduction in spoiler size from 3.5 inches (8.9 cm) to 2.5 inches (6.4 cm), a two-inch (5.1 cm) reduction of the splitter and resizing the deck fin.

NASCAR Executive Vice-president and Chief Racing Development Officer Steve O'Donnell said that NASCAR looks "at it as a never-ending journey; if we can improve we’re going to do that. We wanted to go the direction of low downforce, see how that worked, not kind of go all the way in and hope that we are directionally right. And we are seeing that play out. We’ve seen some great racing at the beginning of the year. But we also knew that we had some more levers that we could pull if the direction kind of proved out, so we’ve tried some of those things. We’ve tested it and what we’ve also wanted to do is lower some of the corner speeds to allow for even more passing. That was one of the areas where we’ve seen minimal change, but there are some levers we can pull to really drive that down.”

=== Entry list ===
The preliminary entry list for the race included forty cars and was released on June 3, 2016, at 12:29 pm ET.

No.	Driver	Team	Manufacturer
1	Jamie McMurray	Chip Ganassi Racing	Chevrolet
2	Brad Keselowski	Team Penske	Ford
3	Austin Dillon	Richard Childress Racing	Chevrolet
4	Kevin Harvick	Stewart–Haas Racing	Chevrolet
5	Kasey Kahne	Hendrick Motorsports	Chevrolet
6	Trevor Bayne	Roush Fenway Racing	Ford
7	Regan Smith	Tommy Baldwin Racing	Chevrolet
10	Danica Patrick	Stewart–Haas Racing	Chevrolet
11	Denny Hamlin	Joe Gibbs Racing	Toyota
13	Casey Mears	Germain Racing	Chevrolet
14	Tony Stewart	Stewart–Haas Racing	Chevrolet
15	Clint Bowyer	HScott Motorsports	Chevrolet
16	Greg Biffle	Roush Fenway Racing	Ford
17	Ricky Stenhouse Jr.	Roush Fenway Racing	Ford
18	Kyle Busch	Joe Gibbs Racing	Toyota
19	Carl Edwards	Joe Gibbs Racing	Toyota
20	Matt Kenseth	Joe Gibbs Racing	Toyota
21	Ryan Blaney (R)	Wood Brothers Racing	Ford
22	Joey Logano	Team Penske	Ford
23	David Ragan	BK Racing	Toyota
24	Chase Elliott (R)	Hendrick Motorsports	Chevrolet
27	Paul Menard	Richard Childress Racing	Chevrolet
30	Josh Wise	The Motorsports Group	Chevrolet
31	Ryan Newman	Richard Childress Racing	Chevrolet
32	Jeffrey Earnhardt (R)	Go FAS Racing	Ford
34	Chris Buescher (R)	Front Row Motorsports	Ford
38	Landon Cassill	Front Row Motorsports	Ford
41	Kurt Busch	Stewart–Haas Racing	Chevrolet
42	Kyle Larson	Chip Ganassi Racing	Chevrolet
43	Aric Almirola	Richard Petty Motorsports	Ford
44	Brian Scott (R)	Richard Petty Motorsports	Ford
46	Michael Annett	HScott Motorsports	Chevrolet
47	A. J. Allmendinger	JTG Daugherty Racing	Chevrolet
48	Jimmie Johnson	Hendrick Motorsports	Chevrolet
55	Cole Whitt	Premium Motorsports	Chevrolet
78	Martin Truex Jr.	Furniture Row Racing	Toyota
83	Matt DiBenedetto	BK Racing	Toyota
88	Dale Earnhardt Jr.	Hendrick Motorsports	Chevrolet
95	Ty Dillon (i)	Circle Sport – Leavine Family Racing	Chevrolet
98	Reed Sorenson	Premium Motorsports	Chevrolet
Official entry list

Key	Meaning
(R)	Running for Rookie of the Year
(i)	Not eligible for Sprint Cup Series points

== Practice ==
=== First practice ===
Chase Elliott was the fastest in the first practice session with a time of 35.709 and a speed of 201.630 mph (324.492 km/h).

Pos	No.	Driver	Team	Manufacturer	Time	Speed
1	24	Chase Elliott	Hendrick Motorsports	Chevrolet	35.709	201.630
2	78	Martin Truex Jr.	Furniture Row Racing	Toyota	35.765	201.314
3	19	Carl Edwards	Joe Gibbs Racing	Toyota	35.782	201.218
First practice results

=== Second practice ===
Carl Edwards was the fastest in the second practice session with a time of 36.406 and speed of 197.770 mph (318.280 km/h).

Pos	No.	Driver	Team	Manufacturer	Time	Speed
1	19	Carl Edwards	Joe Gibbs Racing	Toyota	36.406	197.770
2	18	Kyle Busch	Joe Gibbs Racing	Toyota	36.412	197.737
3	22	Joey Logano	Team Penske	Ford	36.466	197.444
Second practice results

=== Final practice ===
Austin Dillon led the final practice session with a lap time of 37.056 and speed of 194.301 mph (312.697 km/h).

Pos	No.	Driver	Team	Manufacturer	Time	Speed
1	3	Austin Dillon	Richard Childress Racing	Chevrolet	37.056	194.301
2	2	Brad Keselowski	Team Penske	Ford	37.111	194.013
3	48	Jimmie Johnson	Hendrick Motorsports	Chevrolet	37.142	193.851
Final practice results

== Qualifying ==
Joey Logano scored the pole for the race with a time of 36.080 and a speed of 199.557 mph (321.156 km/h). He said afterwards that starting first "feels good. Finally, we were able to break through. The last two weeks have stunk for me and my team. We have won the first two rounds the last few weeks and qualified second. Now we figured out how to be second in the first round and first in the last two. That is a good move. I couldn’t be more proud of the team and the effort they put into this new package. This is such an unknown showing up here so it is cool to show what all the engineers and simulation department were able to do to put together a good package off the truck. I am very happy to be driving this car.”

Martin Truex Jr. said after qualifying second that the track was slippery and hot.

After qualifying third, Tony Stewart said his team is "gaining on it. We've just got to get a little break here to get going. We were going good last week. The guy that won the race, our teammate [Kurt Busch], we were running the same lap times as him the whole race until we had our problem."

The session was halted in the first round after David Ragan spun out and tagged the wall with his right-rear corner.

=== Qualifying results ===
Pos	No.	Driver	Team	Manufacturer	R1	R2	R3
1	22	Joey Logano	Team Penske	Ford	36.181	36.001	36.080
2	78	Martin Truex Jr.	Furniture Row Racing	Toyota	36.412	36.363	36.178
3	14	Tony Stewart	Stewart–Haas Racing	Chevrolet	36.380	36.308	36.190
4	11	Denny Hamlin	Joe Gibbs Racing	Toyota	36.104	36.160	36.222
5	21	Ryan Blaney (R)	Wood Brothers Racing	Ford	36.245	36.337	36.256
6	31	Ryan Newman	Richard Childress Racing	Chevrolet	36.450	36.381	36.296
7	42	Kyle Larson	Chip Ganassi Racing	Chevrolet	36.545	36.317	36.328
8	3	Austin Dillon	Richard Childress Racing	Chevrolet	36.457	36.265	36.361
9	18	Kyle Busch	Joe Gibbs Racing	Toyota	36.449	36.237	36.397
10	24	Chase Elliott (R)	Hendrick Motorsports	Chevrolet	36.468	36.301	36.483
11	19	Carl Edwards	Joe Gibbs Racing	Toyota	36.191	36.148	36.632
12	17	Ricky Stenhouse Jr.	Roush Fenway Racing	Ford	36.583	36.300	36.902
13	6	Trevor Bayne	Roush Fenway Racing	Ford	36.485	36.387	
14	1	Jamie McMurray	Chip Ganassi Racing	Chevrolet	36.489	36.409	
15	2	Brad Keselowski	Team Penske	Ford	36.619	36.443	
16	48	Jimmie Johnson	Hendrick Motorsports	Chevrolet	36.661	36.456	
17	41	Kurt Busch	Stewart–Haas Racing	Chevrolet	36.541	36.515	
18	16	Greg Biffle	Roush Fenway Racing	Ford	36.404	36.575	
19	20	Matt Kenseth	Joe Gibbs Racing	Toyota	36.491	36.635	
20	47	A. J. Allmendinger	JTG Daugherty Racing	Chevrolet	36.671	36.643	
21	95	Ty Dillon (i)	Circle Sport – Leavine Family Racing	Chevrolet	36.460	36.696	
22	34	Chris Buescher (R)	Front Row Motorsports	Ford	36.539	36.709	
23	5	Kasey Kahne	Hendrick Motorsports	Chevrolet	36.482	36.711	
24	13	Casey Mears	Germain Racing	Chevrolet	36.547	36.780	
25	10	Danica Patrick	Stewart–Haas Racing	Chevrolet	36.700		
26	44	Brian Scott (R)	Richard Petty Motorsports	Ford	36.710		
27	88	Dale Earnhardt Jr.	Hendrick Motorsports	Chevrolet	36.720		
28	38	Landon Cassill	Front Row Motorsports	Ford	36.742		
29	4	Kevin Harvick	Stewart–Haas Racing	Chevrolet	36.747		
30	43	Aric Almirola	Richard Petty Motorsports	Ford	36.775		
31	83	Matt DiBenedetto	BK Racing	Toyota	36.846		
32	27	Paul Menard	Richard Childress Racing	Chevrolet	36.960		
33	7	Regan Smith	Tommy Baldwin Racing	Chevrolet	37.177		
34	15	Clint Bowyer	HScott Motorsports	Chevrolet	37.359		
35	23	David Ragan	BK Racing	Toyota	37.363		
36	55	Cole Whitt	Premium Motorsports	Chevrolet	37.652		
37	30	Josh Wise	The Motorsports Group	Chevrolet	37.930		
38	32	Jeffrey Earnhardt (R)	Go FAS Racing	Ford	38.071		
39	46	Michael Annett	HScott Motorsports	Chevrolet	38.358		
40	98	Reed Sorenson	Premium Motorsports	Chevrolet	38.789		
Official qualifying results

== Race ==
=== First half ===
==== Start ====
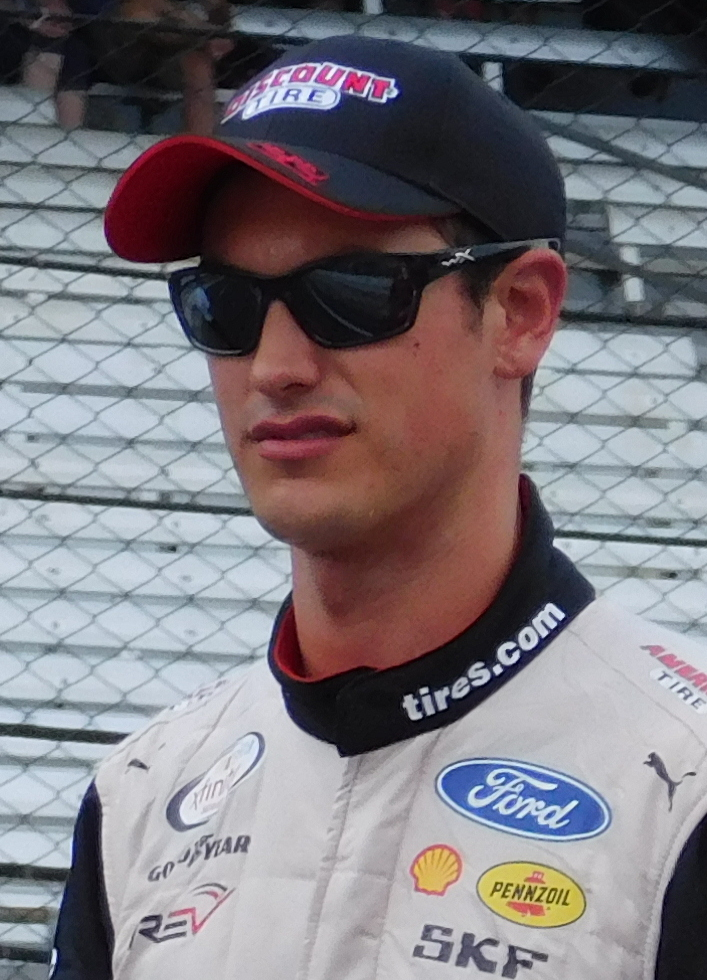
Joey Logano won the race from the pole position.

Under mostly sunny Michigan skies, Joey Logano led the field to the green at 1:19 p.m. He got loose in turn 1 and Martin Truex Jr. took the lead. In the first 10 laps, a number of drivers were reporting being "incredibly loose" because of the changes made to the aero package. Logano made his back to the lead on lap 11. By lap 25, Truex began reeling him in for the race lead. Green flag stops began around lap 39. Logano pitted from the lead two laps later and handed it to teammate Brad Keselowski. Landon Cassill was tagged for his crew being over the wall too soon and was forced to serve a pass-through penalty. Keselowski ran out of gas on the frontstretch on lap 46. He was saved by Truex spinning out in turn 3 which brought out the first caution of the race. He made it to pit road and the lead cycled back to Logano.

==== Second quarter ====
The race restarted on lap 51. Kyle Busch's car caught fire in the engine area and blew up on the backstretch. This brought out the second caution of the race on lap 54. He said afterwards that he felt "the motor kind of going south for about 30 laps or so and finally let go. At least there was plenty of warning and I knew it was going to get hot in there and it certainly did once it let go and it was on fire. It’s just been a dismal month, just haven’t been able to hit anything and get good finishes going." He would go on to finish 40th.

The race restarted on lap 61. The third caution of the race flew on lap 62 for a two-car wreck on the backstretch. Exiting turn 2, Chris Buescher got loose and tapped the left-rear corner of Dale Earnhardt Jr. He got loose, came across the nose of A. J. Allmendinger and sent them both into the wall. Earnhardt continued down the backstretch and spun down the track. Earnhardt said afterwards that he "knew I was going to hit the wall. The No. 34 (Buescher) just drove into the left front quarter panel. Oh, man. I don’t know; them restarts and all that. You’ve got a responsibility to try and take care of everybody out there even when you’re three-wide. I’m disappointed in that. But, we had a pretty good car and we were just kind of taking our time, there. And the car was great. So, it’s a shame.” When asked about the wreck from his point of view, Allmendinger said he wasn't “really sure. I think Junior got hit and I was on the outside of him and that was it. It was kind of weird back there. I’m not really sure what kind of car we had. I thought in clean air we weren’t too bad, but I guess a lot of people could say that. Just not a lot of fun racing there.”

The race restarted on lap 69. A number of cars began pitting on lap 93. Logano pitted the next lap and handed the lead to Kyle Larson. He pitted the next lap and handed the lead to Keselowski. He pitted on lap 99 and handed the lead to Jimmie Johnson. The fourth caution of the race flew on lap 102 for Jeffrey Earnhardt slamming the wall in turn 2. Johnson pitted under the caution and the lead cycled back to Logano. Aric Almirola was tagged for having too many crew members over the wall and restarted the race from the tail-end of the field.

=== Second half ===
==== Halfway ====
The race restarted on lap 107. The fifth caution of the race flew on lap 109 after Jeffrey Earnhardt's car caught on fire after slamming the wall a second time on the backstretch.

The race restarted with 84 laps to go. Logano didn't get a good restart and lost the lead to Chase Elliott. The sixth caution of the race flew with 53 laps to go after Regan Smith made contact with the wall and debris was scattered on the backstretch. Elliott and Logano swapped the lead on pit road, but Elliott exited with the lead.

==== Fourth quarter ====
The race restarted with 47 laps to go. Elliott got a lousy restart and lost the lead to Logano. The seventh caution of the race flew with 46 to go after a multi-car wreck on the backstretch. Exiting turn 2, Casey Mears got into the wall, clipped Danica Patrick who then clipped Brian Scott and sent him head-on into the outside wall.

The race restarted with 40 laps to go. The eighth caution of the race flew with 38 laps to go for a single-car wreck in turn 2. Rounding the turn, Ryan Blaney got loose and slammed the wall. Not far behind, Trevor Bayne got into Johnson and he was slight contact with the wall. During the caution, Johnson drove up to the side of Bayne to show his displeasure. Bayne said over the radio that he "just got really loose there. It wasn’t intentional with the 48."

The race restarted with 33 laps to go. In the last 20 laps, Elliott began closing the deficit down to under a second. The ninth caution of the race flew with 12 laps to go for a single-car wreck on the frontstretch. Crossing the start/finish line, Denny Hamlin suffered a left-rear tire blowout, spun through the grass and hit the inside wall.

The race restarted with seven laps to go and Logano drove on to win the race.

== Post-race ==
=== Driver comments ===
Logano said after the race that it was "a crazy race with the low downforce and with more cautions and more opportunity to screw up pretty much. What a fun race, racing with Chase and Kyle Larson. It is fun to see the young guys up there racing. I am not alone up there as a young guy anymore. I have guys up there younger than me racing for a win.”

Despite earning a career-best finish of second, Elliott said it was "not a good day, nope, not a good day" and that he "can’t do dumb stuff and expect to win this thing. When you do dumb stuff, you don’t win. I did dumb stuff today.”

“It was a solid run for us,” Larson said. “We’ve been consistent as we’ve been in the last year and a half anyways, so it’s nice to be running up front and getting closer to a win. Still got some work to do, but it is nice when we can get a package like this thrown at us just a few weeks before the race, and our guys at the shop and here at the racetrack can look at engineering data and come up with a good piece.”

=== Earnhardt Jr's career-ending concussion ===
On August 1, 2016, Earnhardt admitted on his podcast that he had suffered what would become a season-ending injury at Michigan, but did not know of the seriousness until after the July Daytona race. The U.S. Open break meant drivers had 12 days off before they returned to Sonoma, where he made a trip to Germany before returning to Sonoma. After the ensuing race at Daytona, Earnhardt would be ruled out with concussion symptoms before the Kentucky round, after which he would not be cleared for the rest of the 2016 season, missing half the season. It was found the concussion was a result of a crash in this race.

=== Media comments ===
"If Sunday’s FireKeepers Casino 400 were a school science project it was worthy of a B minus. NASCAR’s latest incarnation of a rules package designed to take away aerodynamic downforce in the pursuit of better racing was on display at MIS. After a weekend of practice and qualifying that didn’t answer many questions prior to the race starting, a feeling of unknown permeated the start of the race. As it turned out the race was won by a driver that dominated in Joey Logano, leading 138 laps on his way to Victory Lane. But the box score doesn’t tell the entire story. The loose feel of the race cars that featured minuscule spoilers and other aerodynamic tweaks created a wild and wooly style of racing at least throughout the field. But at the front of the field the dreaded “clean air” term still was in play and the other drivers that led the 61 laps Logano didn’t clearly had the advantage once they were in the top spot. There were other stretches where the field was strung out around the track for several laps. The experimentation is an ongoing process and NASCAR officials will sift through the data and information of Sunday’s race and no doubt use those takeaways to develop the 2017 rules package. The Michigan rules will be used again next month at Kentucky to provide more feedback. Overall the feeling throughout the garage is one of optimism as NASCAR keeps tinkering with the formula."

— Motor Racing Network lead writer and co-host of The Morning Drive on Sirius XM NASCAR Radio Pete Pistone giving his thoughts on the FireKeepers Casino 400.

Members of the NASCAR media gave their thoughts on the race itself.

Pete Pistone of the Motor Racing Network and Sirius XM NASCAR Radio said that "it was worthy of a B minus," the cars being loose "created a wild and wooly style of racing at least throughout the field," but that clean air "still was in play and the other drivers that led the 61 laps Logano didn’t clearly had the advantage once they were in the top spot" and that the package is "an ongoing process and NASCAR officials will sift through the data and information of Sunday’s race and no doubt use those takeaways to develop the 2017 rules package."

Shawn Windsor of the Detroit Free Press said that lowering "the downforce on the front of the cars let drivers rip along the long, wide straightways at MIS pushing 220 m.p.h. The increased speed — and alternately slower corner speed — meant drivers had more opportunity to maneuver and actually drive their cars." He also noted that "the speed difference between the turns and the straightaway was as much as 40 m.p.h. This means — in theory — drivers have a chance to really maneuver as they hit the stretch. And that means they need more control of their cars, which NASCAR aimed to give them with the new rules that let teams lower the downforce. The flip side, as Logano pointed out, is that extra speed and more bunched-together drivers — feeling like they have more control — 'is a recipe for disaster.' That recipe might be good for ratings, however. Everyone agrees the sport needs more passing, more jockeying. It’s in the heat of the scrum that reveals personalities, shows us who is willing to live on the edge and who is not."

Matt Weaver of Autoweek said that "one race with the extra-reduced downforce configurations [is] too small of a sample size to reach any sort of definite conclusion," especially "when considering that it was conducted on two-mile Michigan -- an anomaly on the Sprint Cup schedule," that "no package will ever be perfect," unless NASCAR implements "the most wacky of short track promotional tactics, the fastest cars and best drivers will always find their way to the front of the field," that Logano's dominant performance "shouldn't take away from what was a really enjoyable race -- and by most accounts -- a step in the right direction for the entire industry," that this race "was a massive improvement over the high drag package used last summer at Michigan and Indianapolis" and that "NASCAR is starting to move in the right direction and appears primed to make these cars even more unstable."

== Race results ==
Pos	No.	Driver	Team	Manufacturer	Laps	Pts.
1	22	Joey Logano	Team Penske	Ford	200	45
2	24	Chase Elliott (R)	Hendrick Motorsports	Chevrolet	200	40
3	42	Kyle Larson	Chip Ganassi Racing	Chevrolet	200	39
4	2	Brad Keselowski	Team Penske	Ford	200	38
5	4	Kevin Harvick	Stewart–Haas Racing	Chevrolet	200	36
6	19	Carl Edwards	Joe Gibbs Racing	Toyota	200	35
7	14	Tony Stewart	Stewart–Haas Racing	Chevrolet	200	34
8	3	Austin Dillon	Richard Childress Racing	Chevrolet	200	33
9	1	Jamie McMurray	Chip Ganassi Racing	Chevrolet	200	32
10	41	Kurt Busch	Stewart–Haas Racing	Chevrolet	200	31
11	31	Ryan Newman	Richard Childress Racing	Chevrolet	200	31
12	78	Martin Truex Jr.	Furniture Row Racing	Toyota	200	30
13	5	Kasey Kahne	Hendrick Motorsports	Chevrolet	200	28
14	20	Matt Kenseth	Joe Gibbs Racing	Toyota	200	27
15	6	Trevor Bayne	Roush Fenway Racing	Ford	200	26
16	48	Jimmie Johnson	Hendrick Motorsports	Chevrolet	200	26
17	21	Ryan Blaney (R)	Wood Brothers Racing	Ford	200	24
18	27	Paul Menard	Richard Childress Racing	Chevrolet	200	24
19	16	Greg Biffle	Roush Fenway Racing	Ford	200	22
20	34	Chris Buescher (R)	Front Row Motorsports	Ford	200	21
21	10	Danica Patrick	Stewart–Haas Racing	Chevrolet	200	20
22	23	David Ragan	BK Racing	Toyota	200	19
23	15	Clint Bowyer	HScott Motorsports	Chevrolet	200	18
24	95	Ty Dillon (i)	Circle Sport – Leavine Family Racing	Chevrolet	200	0
25	38	Landon Cassill	Front Row Motorsports	Ford	200	16
26	43	Aric Almirola	Richard Petty Motorsports	Ford	200	15
27	55	Cole Whitt	Premium Motorsports	Chevrolet	200	14
28	46	Michael Annett	HScott Motorsports	Chevrolet	200	13
29	17	Ricky Stenhouse Jr.	Roush Fenway Racing	Ford	199	12
30	30	Josh Wise	The Motorsports Group	Chevrolet	197	11
31	98	Reed Sorenson	Premium Motorsports	Chevrolet	194	10
32	13	Casey Mears	Germain Racing	Chevrolet	189	9
33	11	Denny Hamlin	Joe Gibbs Racing	Toyota	188	8
34	83	Matt DiBenedetto	BK Racing	Toyota	185	7
35	7	Regan Smith	Tommy Baldwin Racing	Chevrolet	179	6
36	44	Brian Scott (R)	Richard Petty Motorsports	Ford	154	5
37	32	Jeffrey Earnhardt (R)	Go FAS Racing	Ford	101	4
38	47	A. J. Allmendinger	JTG Daugherty Racing	Chevrolet	62	3
39	88	Dale Earnhardt Jr.	Hendrick Motorsports	Chevrolet	61	2
40	18	Kyle Busch	Joe Gibbs Racing	Toyota	52	1
Official race results

=== Race summary ===
- Lead changes: 14 among different drivers
- Cautions/Laps: 9 for 46
- Red flags: 0
- Time of race: 2 hours, 58 minutes and 47 seconds
- Average speed: 134.241 miles per hour (216.040 km/h)

== Media ==
=== Television ===
Fox NASCAR televised the race in the United States on FS1 for the second consecutive year. Mike Joy was the lap-by-lap announcer, while three-time Michigan winner, Jeff Gordon and two-time winner Darrell Waltrip were the color commentators. Jamie Little, Vince Welch and Matt Yocum reported from pit lane during the race.

FS1 Television
Booth announcers	Pit reporters
Lap-by-lap: Mike Joy; Color-commentator: Jeff Gordon; Color commentator: Darrell Waltrip	Jamie Little; Vince Welch; Matt Yocum

=== Radio ===
Radio coverage of the race was broadcast by Motor Racing Network (MRN) and simulcasted on Sirius XM NASCAR Radio. Joe Moore, Jeff Striegle and five-time Michigan winner Rusty Wallace announced the race in the booth while the field is racing on the front stretch. Dave Moody called the race from a billboard outside of turn 2 when the field was racing through turns 1 and 2. Mike Bagley called the race from a platform outside of turn 3 when the field was racing through turns 3 and 4. Alex Hayden, Winston Kelley and Pete Pistone reported from pit lane during the race.

MRN
Booth announcers	Turn announcers	Pit reporters
Lead announcer: Joe Moore; Announcer: Jeff Striegle; Announcer: Rusty Wallace	Turns 1 & 2: Dave Moody; Turns 3 & 4: Mike Bagley	Alex Hayden; Winston Kelley; Pete Pistone

== Standings after the race ==
Drivers' Championship standings
	Pos	Manufacturer	Points
	1	Kevin Harvick	526
	2	Kurt Busch	496 (–30)
	3	Brad Keselowski	480 (–46)
	4	Carl Edwards	472 (–54)
3	5	Joey Logano	455 (–71)
1	6	Chase Elliott (R)	453 (–73)
1	7	Jimmie Johnson	441 (–85)
1	8	Martin Truex Jr.	433 (–93)
4	9	Kyle Busch	417 (–109)
	10	Matt Kenseth	409 (–117)
	11	Dale Earnhardt Jr.	383 (–143)
1	12	Austin Dillon	381 (–145)
1	13	Denny Hamlin	380 (–146)
	14	Jamie McMurray	374 (–152)
1	15	Ryan Newman	369 (–157)
1	16	Ryan Blaney (R)	364 (–162)
Official driver's standings

Manufacturers' Championship standings
Pos	Manufacturer	Points
1	Toyota	623
2	Chevrolet	606 (–17)
3	Ford	559 (–64)
Official manufacturers' standings

- Note: Only the first 16 positions are included for the driver standings.
  . – Driver has clinched a position in the Chase for the Sprint Cup.

Previous race: 2016 Axalta "We Paint Winners" 400	Sprint Cup Series; 2016 season	Next race: 2016 Toyota/Save Mart 350
