= 2015 Quicken Loans Race for Heroes 500 =

Race details
- Race 35 of 36 in the 2015 NASCAR Sprint Cup Series
- Date: November 15, 2015
- Location: Jeff Gordon Raceway in Avondale, Arizona
- Course: Permanent racing facility
- Course length: 1 miles (1.609 km)
- Distance: 219 laps, 219 mi (352.446 km)
- Scheduled distance: 312 laps, 312 mi (502.115 km)
- Weather: Cloudy with a temperature of 65 °F (18 °C); wind out of the east at 8 mph (13 km/h)
- Average speed: 106.512 mph (171.414 km/h)

Pole position
Driver	Jimmie Johnson	Hendrick Motorsports
- Time: 25.147

Most laps led
Driver	Kevin Harvick	Stewart–Haas Racing
- Laps: 143

Winner
No. 88	Dale Earnhardt Jr.	Hendrick Motorsports

Television in the United States
- Network: NBCSN
- Announcers: Rick Allen, Jeff Burton and Steve Letarte
- Nielsen ratings: 1.3/2 (Overnight); 1.4/2 (Final); 2.2 Million viewers

Radio in the United States
- Radio: MRN
- Booth announcers: Jeff Striegle, Alex Hayden and Rusty Wallace
- Turn announcers: Dan Hubbard (1 & 2) and Kyle Rickey (3 & 4)

The 2015 Quicken Loans Race for Heroes 500 was a NASCAR Sprint Cup Series race held on November 15, 2015, at Phoenix International Raceway in Avondale, Arizona. Contested over 219 laps – shortened from 312 due to rain – on the 1-mile (1.6-kilometre) oval, it was the 35th race of the 2015 NASCAR Sprint Cup Series season, ninth race of the Chase and final race of the Eliminator Round. Dale Earnhardt Jr. won the race, his third of the season. Kevin Harvick finished second, while Joey Logano, Kyle Busch and Jimmie Johnson rounded out the top-five.

Johnson won the pole for the race and led 44 laps on his way to a fifth-place finish. Harvick led a race high of 143 laps on his way to a runner-up finish. There were eight lead changes among seven different drivers, as well as two cautions for 29 laps.

This was the 26th career victory for Earnhardt, third of the season, third at Phoenix International Raceway and 10th at the track for Hendrick Motorsports. It moved him to seventh in the points standings. The win clinched Chevrolet its 13th consecutive manufacturers' championship and 39th overall. It would ultimately prove to be Earnhardt's final career victory before his retirement in 2017.

The Quicken Loans Race for Heroes 500 was carried by NBC Sports on the cable/satellite NBCSN network for the American television audience. The radio broadcast for the race was carried by the Motor Racing Network and Sirius XM NASCAR Radio.

== Report ==
=== Background ===
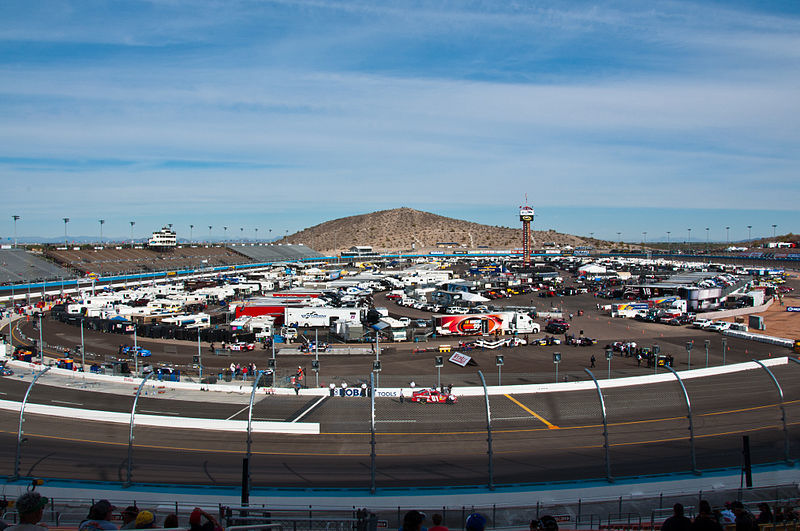
Phoenix International Raceway, the track where the race was held.

Phoenix International Raceway (Jeff Gordon Raceway) is a 1-mile (1.6-kilometre), low-banked tri-oval race track located in Avondale, Arizona. Jeff Gordon entered with a two-point lead over Kyle Busch, a three-point lead over third-placed Kevin Harvick, and Martin Truex Jr. entered fourth six points back. Carl Edwards entered fifth 13 points back, Brad Keselowski was a further six points back in sixth, with the top eight placings completed by Kurt Busch (seventh; thirty-four points behind) and Joey Logano (eighth; sixty-nine points behind).

==== Jeff Gordon Raceway ====
On June 11, 2015, Phoenix International Raceway announced that it would be renamed Jeff Gordon Raceway for the Sprint Cup Series race. Track President Bryan Sperber said that they "were thinking of it like an athlete getting the keys to the city. It (the idea) took off from there. Starting with the quirky layout of our track, it seems like Phoenix always does things a little different. We're the next-to-last race so a lot of good ideas will already have been implemented at other venues. We thought, 'We better step up our game' and do something really cool, that the fans can be a part of, that what we do for Jeff is remembered."

==== Chase-clinching scenarios ====
The following Chase-clinching scenarios were in play for the weekend's race.

- Jeff Gordon: Clinched by virtue of his Martinsville victory.
- Kyle Busch: Would have clinched with either a finish of third or better, fourth and at least one lap led or fifth and most laps led. (Finished fourth with one lap led)
- Kevin Harvick: Would have clinched with a finish of second or better, third and at least one lap led or fourth and most laps led. (Finished second with most [143] laps led)
- Martin Truex Jr., Carl Edwards, Brad Keselowski and Kurt Busch: All four could only guarantee advancement with a win, but could also qualify on points depending on how the rest of the Chase drivers do. (Truex Jr. finished 14th, Edwards 12th, Keselowski ninth and Kurt Busch seventh)
- Joey Logano: Could only advance via a win (point deficit too big for advancement on points). Finished third.

==== Entry list ====
The entry list for the Quicken Loans Race for Heroes 500 was released on Monday, November 9 at 1:23 p.m. Eastern time. Forty-three cars were entered for the race. Ryan Ellis made his Sprint Cup Series debut in the No. 33 Hillman-Circle Sport LLC Chevrolet. Ryan Preece drove the No. 98 Premium Motorsports Ford. Erik Jones drove the No. 20 Joe Gibbs Racing Toyota while Matt Kenseth served the second of his two-race suspension.

No.	Driver	Team	Manufacturer
1	Jamie McMurray	Chip Ganassi Racing	Chevrolet
2	Brad Keselowski (PC3)	Team Penske	Ford
3	Austin Dillon	Richard Childress Racing	Chevrolet
4	Kevin Harvick (PC1)	Stewart–Haas Racing	Chevrolet
5	Kasey Kahne	Hendrick Motorsports	Chevrolet
6	Trevor Bayne	Roush Fenway Racing	Ford
7	Alex Bowman	Tommy Baldwin Racing	Chevrolet
9	Sam Hornish Jr.	Richard Petty Motorsports	Ford
10	Danica Patrick	Stewart–Haas Racing	Chevrolet
11	Denny Hamlin	Joe Gibbs Racing	Toyota
13	Casey Mears	Germain Racing	Chevrolet
14	Tony Stewart (PC4)	Stewart–Haas Racing	Chevrolet
15	Clint Bowyer	Michael Waltrip Racing	Toyota
16	Greg Biffle	Roush Fenway Racing	Ford
17	Ricky Stenhouse Jr.	Roush Fenway Racing	Ford
18	Kyle Busch	Joe Gibbs Racing	Toyota
19	Carl Edwards	Joe Gibbs Racing	Toyota
20	Erik Jones (i)	Joe Gibbs Racing	Toyota
22	Joey Logano	Team Penske	Ford
23	Jeb Burton (R)	BK Racing	Toyota
24	Jeff Gordon (PC6)	Hendrick Motorsports	Chevrolet
26	J. J. Yeley (i)	BK Racing	Toyota
27	Paul Menard	Richard Childress Racing	Chevrolet
31	Ryan Newman	Richard Childress Racing	Chevrolet
32	Joey Gase (i)	Go FAS Racing	Ford
33	Ryan Ellis (i)	Hillman-Circle Sport LLC	Chevrolet
34	Brett Moffitt (R)	Front Row Motorsports	Ford
35	Cole Whitt	Front Row Motorsports	Ford
38	David Gilliland	Front Row Motorsports	Ford
40	Landon Cassill (i)	Hillman-Circle Sport LLC	Chevrolet
41	Kurt Busch (PC5)	Stewart–Haas Racing	Chevrolet
42	Kyle Larson	Chip Ganassi Racing	Chevrolet
43	Aric Almirola	Richard Petty Motorsports	Ford
46	Michael Annett	HScott Motorsports	Chevrolet
47	A. J. Allmendinger	JTG Daugherty Racing	Chevrolet
48	Jimmie Johnson (PC2)	Hendrick Motorsports	Chevrolet
51	Justin Allgaier	HScott Motorsports	Chevrolet
55	David Ragan	Michael Waltrip Racing	Toyota
62	Timmy Hill	Premium Motorsports	Chevrolet
78	Martin Truex Jr.	Furniture Row Racing	Chevrolet
83	Matt DiBenedetto (R)	BK Racing	Toyota
88	Dale Earnhardt Jr.	Hendrick Motorsports	Chevrolet
98	Ryan Preece	Premium Motorsports	Ford
Official entry list

Key	Meaning
(R)	Rookie
(i)	Ineligible for points
(PC#)	Past champions provisional

== Practice ==
=== First practice ===
Jimmie Johnson was the fastest in the first practice session with a time of 25.383 and a speed of 141.827 mph (228.248 km/h).

Pos	No.	Driver	Team	Manufacturer	Time	Speed
1	48	Jimmie Johnson	Hendrick Motorsports	Chevrolet	25.383	141.827
2	42	Kyle Larson	Chip Ganassi Racing	Chevrolet	25.391	141.783
3	41	Kurt Busch	Stewart–Haas Racing	Chevrolet	25.429	141.571
Official first practice results

=== Second practice ===
Kurt Busch was the fastest in the second practice session with a time of 25.783 and a speed of 139.627 mph (224.708 km/h).

Pos	No.	Driver	Team	Manufacturer	Time	Speed
1	41	Kurt Busch	Stewart–Haas Racing	Chevrolet	25.783	139.627
2	19	Carl Edwards	Joe Gibbs Racing	Toyota	25.851	139.260
3	42	Kyle Larson	Chip Ganassi Racing	Chevrolet	25.871	139.152
Official second practice results

=== Final practice ===
Kurt Busch was the fastest in the final practice session with a time of 25.709 and a speed of 140.029 mph (225.355 km/h).

Pos	No.	Driver	Team	Manufacturer	Time	Speed
1	41	Kurt Busch	Stewart–Haas Racing	Chevrolet	25.709	140.029
2	48	Jimmie Johnson	Hendrick Motorsports	Chevrolet	25.827	139.389
3	88	Dale Earnhardt Jr.	Hendrick Motorsports	Chevrolet	25.875	139.130
Official final practice results

== Qualifying ==
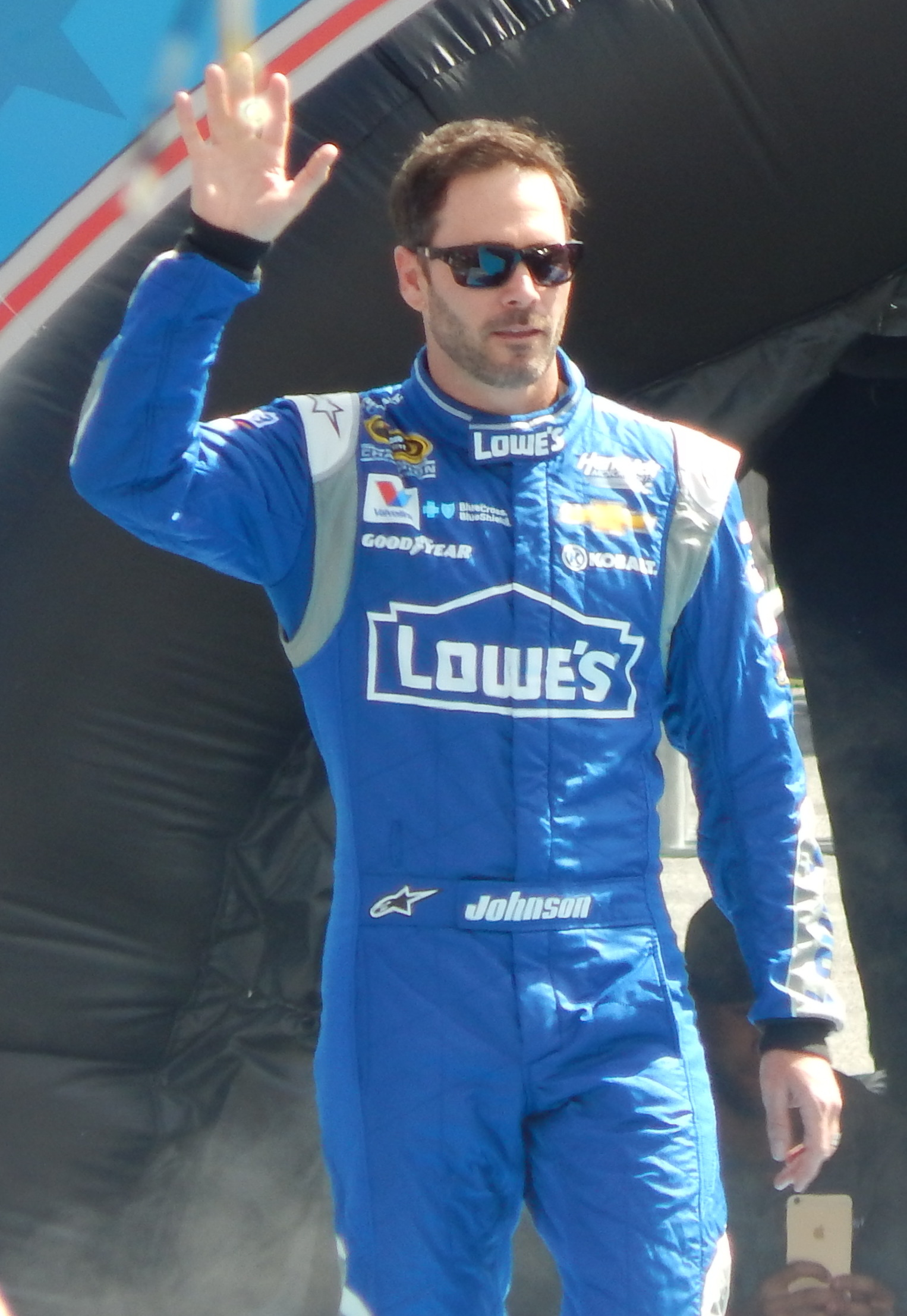
Jimmie Johnson scored the pole for the race.

Jimmie Johnson won the pole with a new track record time of 25.147 and a speed of 143.158 mph (230.390 km/h). He said that his team "didn’t have the summer that we wanted, but these guys have been working so hard on the No. 48 team and at Hendrick Motorsports. So, I’m very happy to see the progress and the direction things are going. It’s been a little bit, everywhere. If we keep doing that, we’re going to close this season out just like we want to and be ready for 2016.” Kurt Busch, who qualified second, said he felt that he "let the team down a little on that lap because our car is better than that. But starting upfront here is a big advantage and we’ll work on the car a little tomorrow to fine tune and be ready to go out and race on Sunday and hope for a win.” Joey Logano, who qualified 14th, said that he "just missed it a little bit. I wish we were in the next round and going for a pole, but the fact of the matter is we’re gonna start 14th and we’re gonna work on our car tomorrow and get it ready to win a race on Sunday.”

=== Qualifying results ===
Pos	No.	Driver	Team	Manufacturer	R1	R2	R3
1	48	Jimmie Johnson	Hendrick Motorsports	Chevrolet	25.688	25.306	25.147
2	41	Kurt Busch	Stewart–Haas Racing	Chevrolet	25.445	25.178	25.196
3	88	Dale Earnhardt Jr.	Hendrick Motorsports	Chevrolet	25.661	25.309	25.249
4	19	Carl Edwards	Joe Gibbs Racing	Toyota	25.610	25.310	25.263
5	78	Martin Truex Jr.	Furniture Row Racing	Chevrolet	25.765	25.386	25.300
6	42	Kyle Larson	Chip Ganassi Racing	Chevrolet	25.448	25.305	25.301
7	20	Erik Jones (i)	Joe Gibbs Racing	Toyota	25.655	25.344	25.313
8	4	Kevin Harvick	Stewart–Haas Racing	Chevrolet	25.552	25.319	25.340
9	5	Kasey Kahne	Hendrick Motorsports	Chevrolet	25.561	25.397	25.341
10	18	Kyle Busch	Joe Gibbs Racing	Toyota	25.489	25.404	25.382
11	24	Jeff Gordon	Hendrick Motorsports	Chevrolet	25.399	25.319	25.458
12	1	Jamie McMurray	Chip Ganassi Racing	Chevrolet	25.804	25.385	25.458
13	11	Denny Hamlin	Joe Gibbs Racing	Toyota	25.440	25.412	—
14	22	Joey Logano	Team Penske	Ford	25.489	25.419	—
15	27	Paul Menard	Richard Childress Racing	Chevrolet	25.747	25.461	—
16	3	Austin Dillon	Richard Childress Racing	Chevrolet	25.604	25.470	—
17	43	Aric Almirola	Richard Petty Motorsports	Ford	25.629	25.481	—
18	2	Brad Keselowski	Team Penske	Ford	25.672	25.483	—
19	17	Ricky Stenhouse Jr.	Roush Fenway Racing	Ford	25.725	25.542	—
20	16	Greg Biffle	Roush Fenway Racing	Ford	25.708	25.588	—
21	10	Danica Patrick	Stewart–Haas Racing	Chevrolet	25.580	25.645	—
22	31	Ryan Newman	Richard Childress Racing	Chevrolet	25.736	25.663	—
23	47	A. J. Allmendinger	JTG Daugherty Racing	Chevrolet	25.746	25.668	—
24	13	Casey Mears	Germain Racing	Chevrolet	25.736	25.763	—
25	51	Justin Allgaier	HScott Motorsports	Chevrolet	25.808	—	—
26	6	Trevor Bayne	Roush Fenway Racing	Ford	25.814	—	—
27	15	Clint Bowyer	Michael Waltrip Racing	Toyota	25.850	—	—
28	9	Sam Hornish Jr.	Richard Petty Motorsports	Ford	25.878	—	—
29	55	David Ragan	Michael Waltrip Racing	Toyota	25.916	—	—
30	83	Matt DiBenedetto (R)	BK Racing	Toyota	25.918	—	—
31	14	Tony Stewart	Stewart–Haas Racing	Chevrolet	25.948	—	—
32	40	Landon Cassill (i)	Hillman-Circle Sport LLC	Chevrolet	26.047	—	—
33	26	J. J. Yeley (i)	BK Racing	Toyota	26.056	—	—
34	38	David Gilliland	Front Row Motorsports	Ford	26.110	—	—
35	7	Alex Bowman	Tommy Baldwin Racing	Chevrolet	26.112	—	—
36	46	Michael Annett	HScott Motorsports	Chevrolet	26.125	—	—
37	23	Jeb Burton (R)	BK Racing	Toyota	26.278	—	—
38	35	Cole Whitt	Front Row Motorsports	Ford	26.312	—	—
39	32	Joey Gase (i)	Go FAS Racing	Ford	26.326	—	—
40	34	Brett Moffitt (R)	Front Row Motorsports	Ford	26.381	—	—
41	98	Ryan Preece	Premium Motorsports	Ford	26.571	—	—
42	33	Ryan Ellis (i)	Hillman-Circle Sport LLC	Chevrolet	26.724	—	—
43	62	Timmy Hill (i)	Premium Motorsports	Chevrolet	27.375	—	—
Official qualifying results

== Race ==
=== First half ===
==== Start ====
The race was scheduled to start at 12:45 p.m., but rain showers delayed the start of the race. After a delay of over six and a half hours, the cars began rolling off pit road just after 7:00 p.m. Under a clear night Arizona sky, Jimmie Johnson led the field to the green flag at 9:27 p.m. He wouldn't lead the first lap though. That honor went to Kurt Busch. He wouldn't be credited with leading those laps, however, after he was black-flagged for beating the control car (the leader) to the line on the initial start and was forced to serve a pass-through penalty. Following the race, Busch said he "had no reason to jump the start. I had no reason to get excited. We (thought we) had 312 laps to go race. But we’ve had a great season.” As a result, Johnson was credited with leading those seven laps. The first caution of the race flew on lap 41. This was a scheduled competition caution because of the rain. Kevin Harvick exited pit road with the lead after taking just right-side tires. Johnson was tagged for speeding on pit road. Danica Patrick was tagged for her crew being over the wall too soon. Both restarted the race from the tail-end of the field.

==== Second quarter ====
The race restarted on lap 48. The heavy betting favorite proceeded to drive away from the rest of the top-10 cars and put everyone up to 20th down a lap. Joey Logano kicked off a round of green flag stops on lap 119. Race leader Harvick pitted on lap 120 and handed the lead to Kyle Busch. He pitted the next lap and handed the lead to Brad Keselowski. He pitted on lap 124 and handed the lead to David Ragan. He pitted on lap 126 and the lead cycled back to Harvick. Trevor Bayne and Keselowski were both tagged for speeding on pit road and were forced to serve drive-through penalties.

=== Second half ===
==== Halfway ====
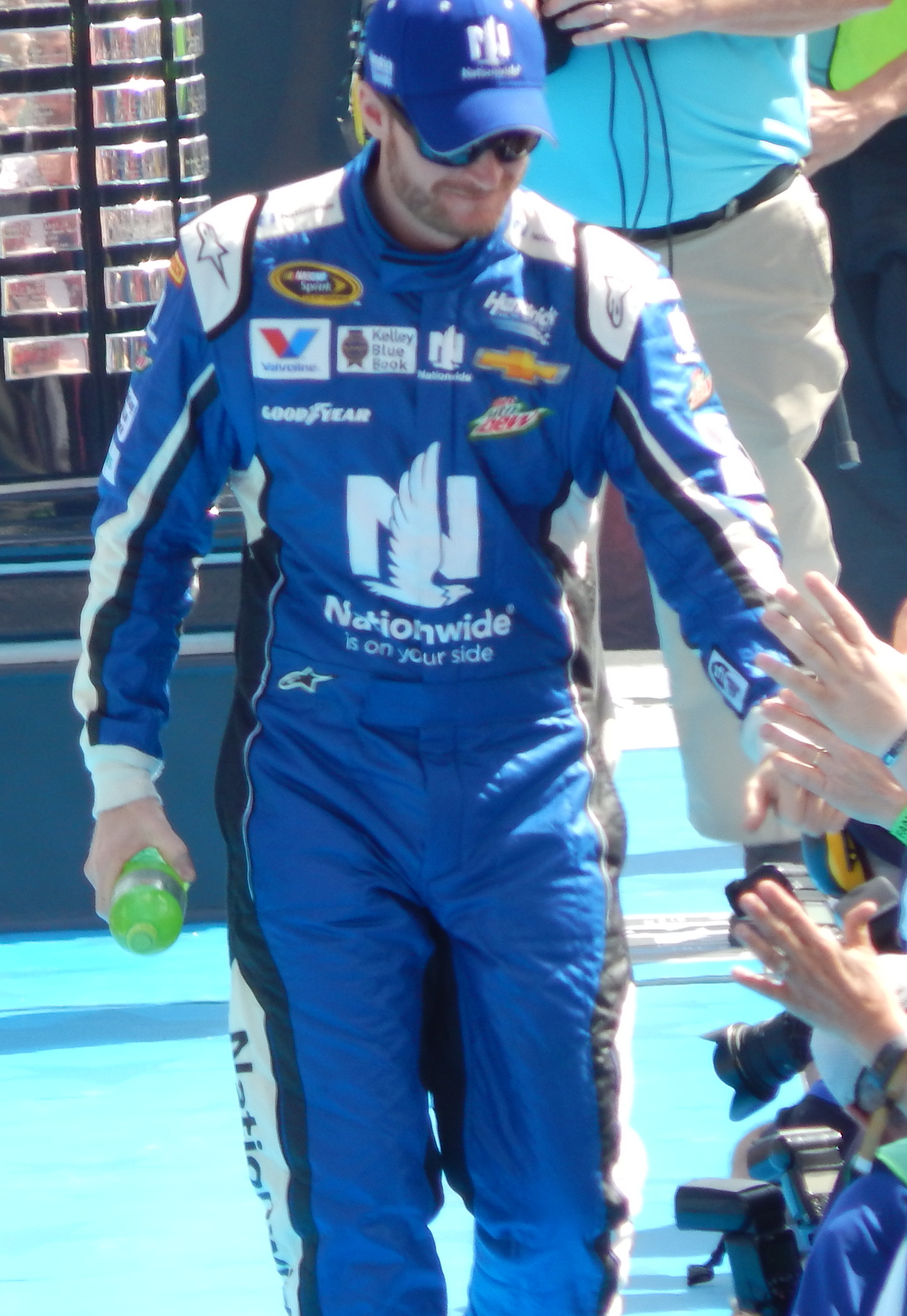
Dale Earnhardt Jr., seen here at the 2015 Daytona 500, scored his 26th and final career victory at Phoenix.

Logano was the first on pit road at lap 194 to kick off the next round of stops. Harvick pitted the next lap and handed the lead to Dale Earnhardt Jr. He pitted the next lap and handed the lead to Jeff Gordon. The second caution of the race flew on lap 196 for a two-car wreck in turn 3. Ricky Stenhouse Jr. got loose, hit the back of Joey Gase and sent them both into the wall. Earnhardt opted not to pit – having just made his stop prior to the caution – and assumed the race lead.

After three attempts to restart the race were waved off because of a safety vehicle sitting on the track in turn 4, the field continued to be under caution due to rain. The race was red-flagged on lap 220. After a few minutes, NASCAR called the race and Earnhardt was declared the winner for the 26th and final time in his career, similar to the rain-shortened 2015 Quicken Loans 400 in June when Kurt Busch scored his second win of the season. His victory also clinched the manufacturer's championship for Chevrolet.

== Post-race ==
=== Driver comments ===
Earnhardt said that his team "had an idea that the rain was in the area, but all the circumstances that played out at the end of the race are just kind of luck I think. I want to give Greg (Ives, crew chief) a lot of credit and the guys. They gave us a good enough car to come here and qualify well. I think the reason why we won this race is because of the way we qualified to give ourselves a position to be up front all night."

After a second-place finish clinched his spot in the championship race, Harvick said that he didn't "want to be greedy and be disappointed with how it went today when you look at the big picture. I think it's definitely been a Chase that's been a little bit up and down for us, but the guys have battled through, and we've survived a lot of situations to be in contention for next week. You always want to win when you have a car like we did today, but I'll take it again next week." He also added that, while losing the race was bittersweet, his Budweiser Chevrolet "just really performed well today and we were able to lead a lot of laps and just really proud of the guys for the decisions that they made overnight to get that last little bit out of the car today and how it performed was really good. Just caution came out at the wrong time, and we didn't get to make up the ground on the racetrack under green, where Dale was pitted and the way that they came out of the pits just didn't time out well. But still proud of our group, and sometimes you win some of those things, sometimes you don't, but in the end the big picture is what it's all about.”

After a third-place finish wasn't enough to advance Logano to the championship race, he said that it's not easy "to play the race with rain in the area. You don’t know what’s gonna happen, but you just hope there’s another shot. You hope that there’s a restart and if two of them slip up and you’re able to put it three-wide on the bottom, or do something like that, but just didn’t ever have the opportunity there at the end. We had plenty of opportunities to try and get ourselves to the front, we just weren’t as fast at the 4 (Kevin Harvick). We were a solid second place car, but (Dale Earnhardt) Junior timed it out really well when they pitted to that caution and it worked out really well for them.” He also said that he "can't help the weather. I guess it wasn’t in the cards tonight, but I’m still super proud of what this Pennzoil team has done all year.”

Following a fourth-place finish that advanced Kyle Busch to the championship race, he said that he was gratified with "this team. (Crew chief) Adam Stevens and these guys, they worked hard and they persevered all through the beginning part of the season when I was gone working with David Ragan, Erik Jones and Matt Crafton and those guys that drove my race car. But once I was able to return, it felt pretty good to get back in the car and have my team guys motivated and ready to have me back, and we've really excelled since then.”

Following a sixth-place finish, Gordon said that drivers "want to win when you have a car like we did today, but I'll take it again next week. We're excited about the opportunity to go down there (Homestead). Certainly for me, my final race. I can't think of anything sweeter than just having that opportunity to go down there and battle for the championship and seeing what happens.”

After being black-flagged at the start of the race and rallying to a seventh-place finish, Kurt Busch said that he "had a great season, we won two races, sat on three poles. We did everything possible to put polish on a season like this and get out there with elbow grease and work hard it, and you know, when there’s some tarnish that’s sitting there, polish and polish and polish, that’s all I kept doing all year.”

After a 14th-place finish was enough to beat out Carl Edwards for the final championship race spot, Martin Truex Jr. said that it was "obviously an exciting day for everybody at Furniture Row Racing and me. Just super proud of my team for the season we've been able to put together, and I feel like we've overcome a lot of obstacles. We have kind of overcome a lot of odds, and I'm just proud to be part of this group and looking forward to having the opportunity to do something that we've all dreamed about our whole lives next weekend."

== Race results ==
Pos	No.	Driver	Team	Manufacturer	Laps	Points
1	88	Dale Earnhardt Jr.	Hendrick Motorsports	Chevrolet	219	47
2	4	Kevin Harvick	Stewart–Haas Racing	Chevrolet	219	44
3	22	Joey Logano	Team Penske	Ford	219	41
4	18	Kyle Busch	Joe Gibbs Racing	Toyota	219	41
5	48	Jimmie Johnson	Hendrick Motorsports	Chevrolet	219	40
6	24	Jeff Gordon	Hendrick Motorsports	Chevrolet	219	39
7	41	Kurt Busch	Stewart–Haas Racing	Chevrolet	219	37
8	11	Denny Hamlin	Joe Gibbs Racing	Toyota	219	36
9	2	Brad Keselowski	Team Penske	Ford	219	36
10	43	Aric Almirola	Richard Petty Motorsports	Ford	219	34
11	31	Ryan Newman	Richard Childress Racing	Chevrolet	219	33
12	19	Carl Edwards	Joe Gibbs Racing	Toyota	219	32
13	27	Paul Menard	Richard Childress Racing	Chevrolet	219	31
14	78	Martin Truex Jr.	Furniture Row Racing	Toyota	219	30
15	1	Jamie McMurray	Chip Ganassi Racing	Chevrolet	218	29
16	10	Danica Patrick	Stewart–Haas Racing	Chevrolet	218	28
17	51	Justin Allgaier	HScott Motorsports	Chevrolet	218	27
18	55	David Ragan	Michael Waltrip Racing	Toyota	218	27
19	20	Erik Jones (i)	Joe Gibbs Racing	Toyota	218	0
20	3	Austin Dillon	Richard Childress Racing	Chevrolet	218	24
21	42	Kyle Larson	Chip Ganassi Racing	Chevrolet	218	23
22	13	Casey Mears	Germain Racing	Chevrolet	218	22
23	15	Clint Bowyer	Michael Waltrip Racing	Toyota	218	21
24	47	A. J. Allmendinger	JTG Daugherty Racing	Chevrolet	218	20
25	16	Greg Biffle	Roush Fenway Racing	Ford	218	19
26	5	Kasey Kahne	Hendrick Motorsports	Chevrolet	217	18
27	14	Tony Stewart	Stewart–Haas Racing	Chevrolet	217	17
28	83	Matt DiBenedetto (R)	BK Racing	Toyota	217	16
29	26	J. J. Yeley (i)	BK Racing	Toyota	216	0
30	38	David Gilliland	Front Row Motorsports	Ford	216	14
31	9	Sam Hornish Jr.	Richard Petty Motorsports	Ford	215	13
32	46	Michael Annett	HScott Motorsports	Chevrolet	215	12
33	35	Cole Whitt	Front Row Motorsports	Ford	215	11
34	6	Trevor Bayne	Roush Fenway Racing	Ford	215	10
35	40	Landon Cassill (i)	Hillman-Circle Sport LLC	Chevrolet	215	0
36	34	Brett Moffitt (R)	Front Row Motorsports	Ford	215	8
37	98	Ryan Preece	Premium Motorsports	Ford	214	7
38	7	Alex Bowman	Tommy Baldwin Racing	Chevrolet	214	6
39	23	Jeb Burton (R)	BK Racing	Toyota	213	5
40	33	Ryan Ellis (i)	Hillman-Circle Sport LLC	Chevrolet	211	0
41	17	Ricky Stenhouse Jr.	Roush Fenway Racing	Ford	194	3
42	32	Joey Gase (i)	Go FAS Racing	Ford	161	0
43	62	Timmy Hill (i)	Premium Motorsports	Chevrolet	127	0
Official Quicken Loans Race for Heroes 500 results

=== Race statistics ===
- 8 lead changes among 7 different drivers
- 2 cautions for 29 laps
- Time of race: 2 hours, 3 minutes, 22 seconds
- Average speed: 106.512 mph (171.414 km/h)
- Dale Earnhardt Jr. took home $462,976 in winnings

Lap leaders
Laps	Leader
1-44	Jimmie Johnson
45-118	Kevin Harvick
119	Kyle Busch
120-123	Brad Keselowski
124	David Ragan
125-193	Kevin Harvick
194	Dale Earnhardt Jr.
195-198	Jeff Gordon
199-219	Dale Earnhardt Jr.

Total laps led
Leader	Laps
Kevin Harvick	143
Jimmie Johnson	44
Dale Earnhardt Jr.	22
Jeff Gordon	4
Brad Keselowski	4
Kyle Busch	1
David Ragan	1

==== Race awards ====
- Coors Light Pole Award: Jimmie Johnson (25.147, 143.158 mph (230.390 km/h))
- 3M Lap Leader: Kevin Harvick (143 laps)
- American Ethanol Green Flag Restart Award: Dale Earnhardt Jr.
- Duralast Brakes "Bake In The Race" Award: Jimmie Johnson
- Freescale "Wide Open": Kevin Harvick
- Ingersoll Rand Power Move: Dale Earnhardt Jr. (7 positions)
- MAHLE Clevite Engine Builder of the Race: Hendrick Engines, #4
- Mobil 1 Driver of the Race: Kevin Harvick (144.7 driver rating)
- Moog Steering and Suspension Problem Solver of The Race: Aric Almirola (crew chief Trent Owens (-0.178 seconds))
- NASCAR Sprint Cup Leader Bonus: No winner: rolls over to $30,000 at next event
- Sherwin-Williams Fastest Lap: Carl Edwards (Lap 5, 26.103, 137.915 mph (221.953 km/h))
- Sunoco Rookie of The Race: Matt DiBenedetto

== Media ==
=== Television ===
NBC Sports was scheduled to covered the race on the television side but NBCSN covered the race due to rain. Rick Allen, two-time Phoenix winner Jeff Burton and Steve Letarte had the call in the booth for the race. Dave Burns, Mike Massaro, Marty Snider and Kelli Stavast handled pit road on the television side.

NBCSN
Booth announcers	Pit reporters
Lap-by-lap: Rick Allen; Color-commentator: Jeff Burton; Color-commentator: Steve Letarte	Dave Burns; Mike Massaro; Marty Snider; Kelli Stavast

=== Radio ===
MRN had the radio call for the race, which was simulcast on Sirius XM NASCAR Radio. Jeff Striegle, Alex Hayden and 1998 race winner Rusty Wallace called the race from the booth when the field was racing down the frontstretch. Dan Hubbard called the race from atop the turn 1 suites when the field was racing through turns 1 and 2. Kyle Rickey called the race from a billboard outside turn 4 when the field was racing through turns 3 and 4. Winston Kelley, Pete Pistone and Steve Post handled pit road on the radio side.

MRN
Booth announcers	Turn announcers	Pit reporters
Lead announcer: Jeff Striegle; Announcer: Alex Hayden; Announcer: Rusty Wallace	Turns 1 & 2: Dan Hubbard; Turns 3 & 4: Kyle Rickey	Winston Kelley; Pete Pistone; Steve Post

== Standings after the race ==
Drivers' Championship standings

	Pos	Driver	Points
2	1	Kevin Harvick	5,000
1	2	Jeff Gordon	5,000 (–0)
1	3	Kyle Busch	5,000 (–0)
	4	Martin Truex Jr.	5,000 (–0)
	5	Carl Edwards	2,334 (–2,666)
2	6	Joey Logano	2,319 (–2,681)
2	7	Dale Earnhardt Jr.	2,306 (–2,694)
2	8	Brad Keselowski	2,304 (–2,696)
2	9	Kurt Busch	2,297 (–2,703)
	10	Denny Hamlin	2,293 (–2,707)
	11	Ryan Newman	2,286 (–2,714)
	12	Jimmie Johnson	2,280 (–2,720)
	13	Jamie McMurray	2,264 (–2,736)
	14	Paul Menard	2,239 (–2,761)
	15	Matt Kenseth	2,197 (–2,803)
	16	Clint Bowyer	2,174 (–2,826)

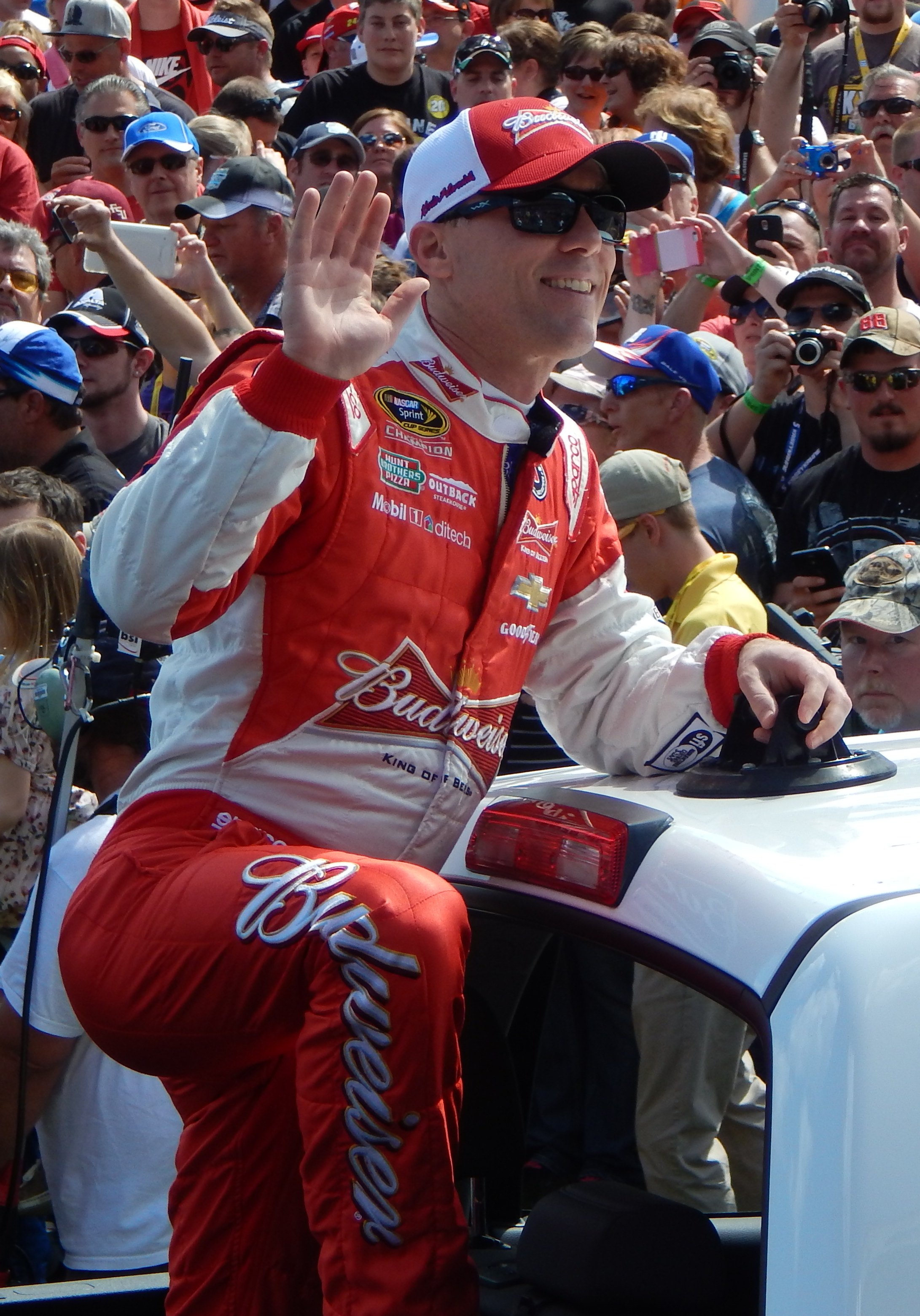
Kevin Harvick left Phoenix as the points leader.

Manufacturers' Championship standings

Pos	Manufacturer	Points
1	Chevrolet	1,542
2	Toyota	1,473 (–69)
3	Ford	1,455 (–87)

- Note: Only the first sixteen positions are included for the driver standings.

Previous race: 2015 AAA Texas 500	Sprint Cup Series; 2015 season	Next race: 2015 Ford EcoBoost 400
