= 2021 Jockey Made in America 250 =

NASCAR Cup Series race

Race details
- Race 20 of 36 in the 2021 NASCAR Cup Series
- Date: July 4, 2021
- Location: Road America in Elkhart Lake, Wisconsin
- Course: Permanent racing facility
- Course length: 4.048 miles (6.515 km)
- Distance: 62 laps, 250.48 mi (403.11 km)
- Average speed: 86.271 miles per hour (138.840 km/h)

Pole position
Driver	William Byron	Hendrick Motorsports
- Time: 2:12:049

Most laps led
Driver	Chase Elliott	Hendrick Motorsports
- Laps: 24

Winner
No. 9	Chase Elliott	Hendrick Motorsports

Television in the United States
- Network: NBC
- Announcers: Rick Allen, Jeff Burton, Steve Letarte and Dale Earnhardt Jr.

Radio in the United States
- Radio: MRN
- Booth announcers: Alex Hayden and Jeff Striegle
- Turn announcers: Steve Post (1 & 2), Dave Moody (3 & 4), Mike Bagley (5 & 6), Eric Morse (7 & 8), Jason Toy (9 & 10), Kyle Rickey (11), Kurt Becker (12), Tim Catalfamo (13 & 14)

The 2021 Jockey Made in America 250 was a NASCAR Cup Series race held on July 4, 2021, at Road America in Elkhart Lake, Wisconsin. Contested over 62 laps on the 4.048-mile (6.515 km) road course, it was the 20th race of the 2021 NASCAR Cup Series season.

== Report ==
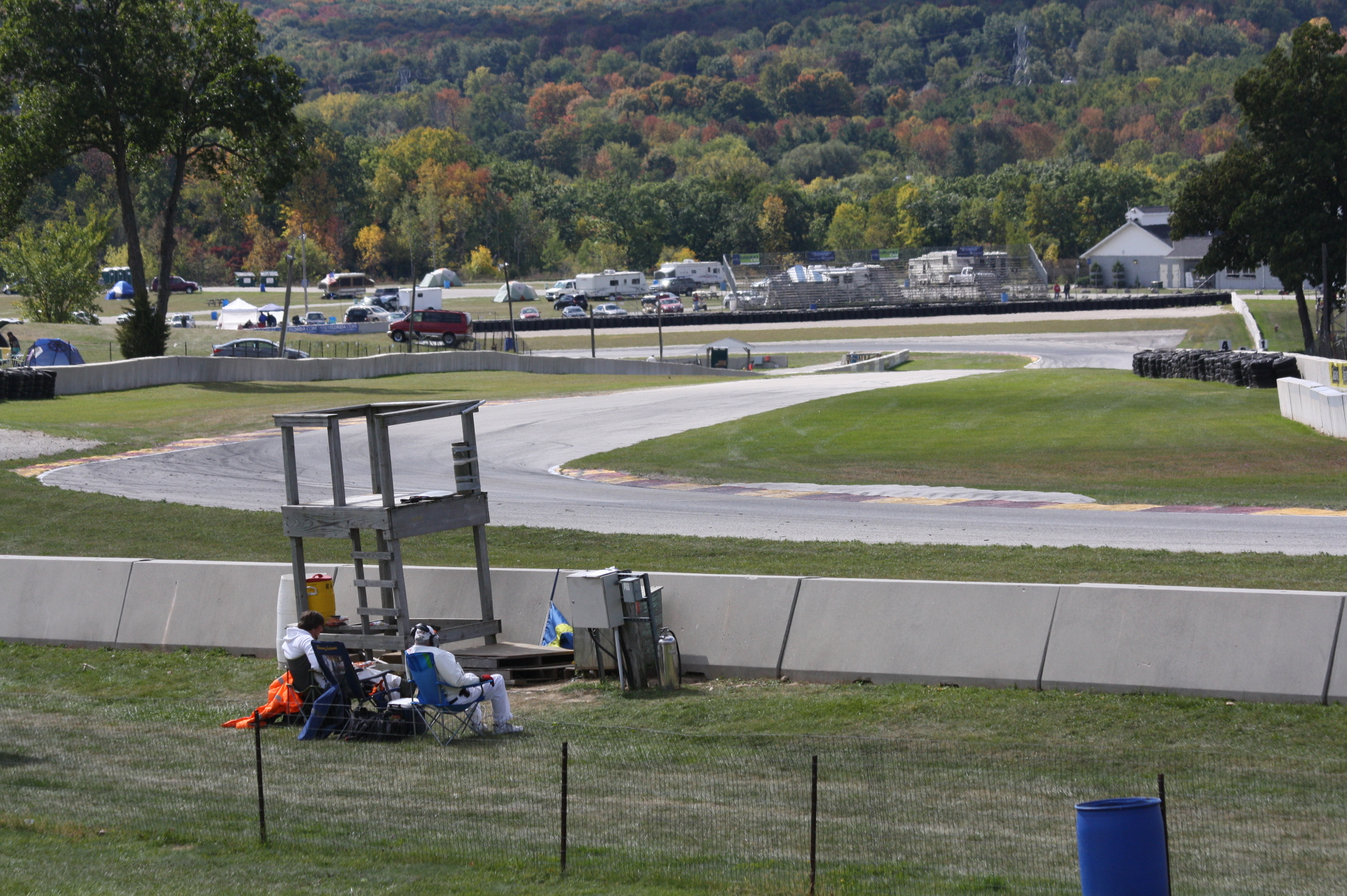
Road America, the track where the race was held

=== Background ===
Road America is a motorsport road course located near Elkhart Lake, Wisconsin on Wisconsin Highway 67. It has hosted races since the 1950s and currently hosts races in the NASCAR Xfinity Series, NTT Indycar Series, NTTWeatherTech SportsCar Championship, SCCA Pirelli World Challenge, ASRA, AMA Superbike series, IndyCar Series, and SCCA Pro Racing's Trans-Am Series.

In June 2020, it was reported that Road America was in negotiations to host the Cup Series in 2021. When NASCAR revealed the 2021 Cup Series schedule on September 30, 2020, Road America was included on the Fourth of July weekend. Following the late addition of the O'Reilly Auto Parts 253 at Daytona International Speedway, Road America became one of seven road courses on the 2021 Cup calendar, the most in series history. Wisconsin-based Kwik Trip was announced as the presenting sponsor for the race on April 13, 2021, which would be called it the "Road America 250 presented by Kwik Trip". However, on May 12, 2021, the clothing company Jockey, also headquartered in Wisconsin, was announced as the title sponsor for the race, which would be known as the "Jockey Made in America 250 presented by Kwik Trip."

==== Entry list ====
- (R) denotes rookie driver.
- (i) denotes driver who are ineligible for series driver points.

No.	Driver	Team	Manufacturer
00	Quin Houff	StarCom Racing	Chevrolet
1	Kurt Busch	Chip Ganassi Racing	Chevrolet
2	Brad Keselowski	Team Penske	Ford
3	Austin Dillon	Richard Childress Racing	Chevrolet
4	Kevin Harvick	Stewart-Haas Racing	Ford
5	Kyle Larson	Hendrick Motorsports	Chevrolet
6	Ryan Newman	Roush Fenway Racing	Ford
7	Corey LaJoie	Spire Motorsports	Chevrolet
8	Tyler Reddick	Richard Childress Racing	Chevrolet
9	Chase Elliott	Hendrick Motorsports	Chevrolet
10	Aric Almirola	Stewart-Haas Racing	Ford
11	Denny Hamlin	Joe Gibbs Racing	Toyota
12	Ryan Blaney	Team Penske	Ford
14	Chase Briscoe (R)	Stewart-Haas Racing	Ford
15	James Davison	Rick Ware Racing	Chevrolet
16	A. J. Allmendinger (i)	Kaulig Racing	Chevrolet
17	Chris Buescher	Roush Fenway Racing	Ford
18	Kyle Busch	Joe Gibbs Racing	Toyota
19	Martin Truex Jr.	Joe Gibbs Racing	Toyota
20	Christopher Bell	Joe Gibbs Racing	Toyota
21	Matt DiBenedetto	Wood Brothers Racing	Ford
22	Joey Logano	Team Penske	Ford
23	Bubba Wallace	23XI Racing	Toyota
24	William Byron	Hendrick Motorsports	Chevrolet
33	Austin Cindric (i)	Team Penske	Ford
34	Michael McDowell	Front Row Motorsports	Ford
37	Ryan Preece	JTG Daugherty Racing	Chevrolet
38	Anthony Alfredo (R)	Front Row Motorsports	Ford
41	Cole Custer	Stewart-Haas Racing	Ford
42	Ross Chastain	Chip Ganassi Racing	Chevrolet
43	Erik Jones	Richard Petty Motorsports	Chevrolet
47	Ricky Stenhouse Jr.	JTG Daugherty Racing	Chevrolet
48	Alex Bowman	Hendrick Motorsports	Chevrolet
51	Cody Ware (i)	Petty Ware Racing	Chevrolet
52	Josh Bilicki	Rick Ware Racing	Ford
53	Ryan Eversley	Rick Ware Racing	Chevrolet
77	Justin Haley (i)	Spire Motorsports	Chevrolet
78	Kyle Tilley	Live Fast Motorsports	Ford
96	Ty Dillon (i)	Gaunt Brothers Racing	Toyota
99	Daniel Suárez	Trackhouse Racing Team	Chevrolet
Official entry list

== Practice ==
Kurt Busch was the fastest in the practice session with a time of 2:13:849 seconds and a speed of 108.875 mph (175.217 km/h).

=== Practice results ===
Pos	No.	Driver	Team	Manufacturer	Time	Speed
1	1	Kurt Busch	Chip Ganassi Racing	Chevrolet	2:13:849	108.875
2	18	Kyle Busch	Joe Gibbs Racing	Toyota	2:14:116	108.658
3	33	Austin Cindric (i)	Team Penske	Ford	2:14:280	108.525
Official practice results

== Qualifying ==
William Byron scored the pole for the race with a time of 2:12:049 and a speed of 110.359 mph (177.606 km/h).

=== Qualifying results ===
Pos	No.	Driver	Team	Manufacturer	R1	R2
1	24	William Byron	Hendrick Motorsports	Chevrolet	2:11:830	2:12:049
2	5	Kyle Larson	Hendrick Motorsports	Chevrolet	2:12:114	2:12:233
3	16	A. J. Allmendinger (i)	Kaulig Racing	Chevrolet	2:11:793	2:12:668
4	8	Tyler Reddick	Richard Childress Racing	Chevrolet	2:12:211	2:12:711
5	33	Austin Cindric (i)	Team Penske	Ford	2:11:130	2:12:760
6	11	Denny Hamlin	Joe Gibbs Racing	Toyota	2:12:205	2:12:849
7	21	Matt DiBenedetto	Wood Brothers Racing	Ford	2:12:708	2:12:887
8	42	Ross Chastain	Chip Ganassi Racing	Chevrolet	2:12:125	2:13:389
9	19	Martin Truex Jr.	Joe Gibbs Racing	Toyota	2:12:407	2:13:602
10	48	Alex Bowman	Hendrick Motorsports	Chevrolet	2:12:739	2:13:701
11	99	Daniel Suárez	Trackhouse Racing Team	Chevrolet	2:12:354	2:13:736
12	17	Chris Buescher	Roush Fenway Racing	Ford	2:12:829	2:14:151
13	20	Christopher Bell	Joe Gibbs Racing	Toyota	2:12:964	—
14	22	Joey Logano	Team Penske	Ford	2:12:967	—
15	41	Cole Custer	Stewart-Haas Racing	Ford	2:12:986	—
16	1	Kurt Busch	Chip Ganassi Racing	Chevrolet	2:13:363	—
17	12	Ryan Blaney	Team Penske	Ford	2:13:561	—
18	34	Michael McDowell	Front Row Motorsports	Ford	2:13:580	—
19	10	Aric Almirola	Stewart-Haas Racing	Ford	2:13:607	—
20	2	Brad Keselowski	Team Penske	Ford	2:13:786	—
21	43	Erik Jones	Richard Petty Motorsports	Chevrolet	2:13:840	—
22	77	Justin Haley (i)	Spire Motorsports	Chevrolet	2:14:026	—
23	7	Corey LaJoie	Spire Motorsports	Chevrolet	2:14:171	—
24	38	Anthony Alfredo (R)	Front Row Motorsports	Ford	2:14:773	—
25	4	Kevin Harvick	Stewart-Haas Racing	Ford	2:14:800	—
26	15	James Davison	Rick Ware Racing	Chevrolet	2:14:870	—
27	52	Josh Bilicki	Rick Ware Racing	Ford	2:15:098	—
28	6	Ryan Newman	Roush Fenway Racing	Ford	2:15:693	—
29	51	Cody Ware (i)	Petty Ware Racing	Chevrolet	2:16:182	—
30	78	Kyle Tilley	Live Fast Motorsports	Ford	2:16:801	—
31	53	Ryan Eversley	Rick Ware Racing	Chevrolet	2:16:816	—
32	37	Ryan Preece	JTG Daugherty Racing	Chevrolet	2:18:531	—
33	00	Quin Houff	StarCom Racing	Chevrolet	2:20:213	—
34	9	Chase Elliott	Hendrick Motorsports	Chevrolet	9:55:698	—
35	14	Chase Briscoe (R)	Stewart-Haas Racing	Ford	10:43:099	—
36	23	Bubba Wallace	23XI Racing	Toyota	15:33:694	—
37	3	Austin Dillon	Richard Childress Racing	Chevrolet	17:01:040	—
38	47	Ricky Stenhouse Jr.	JTG Daugherty Racing	Chevrolet	18:38:206	—
39	96	Ty Dillon (i)	Gaunt Brothers Racing	Toyota	19:51:940	—
40	18	Kyle Busch	Joe Gibbs Racing	Toyota	0.00.000	—
Official qualifying results

== Race ==
=== Stage Results ===
Stage One Laps: 14

Pos	No	Driver	Team	Manufacturer	Points
1	24	William Byron	Hendrick Motorsports	Chevrolet	10
2	16	A. J. Allmendinger (i)	Kaulig Racing	Chevrolet	0
3	5	Kyle Larson	Hendrick Motorsports	Chevrolet	8
4	8	Tyler Reddick	Richard Childress Racing	Chevrolet	7
5	42	Ross Chastain	Chip Ganassi Racing	Chevrolet	6
6	11	Denny Hamlin	Joe Gibbs Racing	Toyota	5
7	20	Christopher Bell	Joe Gibbs Racing	Toyota	4
8	48	Alex Bowman	Hendrick Motorsports	Chevrolet	3
9	1	Kurt Busch	Chip Ganassi Racing	Chevrolet	2
10	9	Chase Elliott	Hendrick Motorsports	Chevrolet	1
Official stage one results

Stage Two Laps: 15

Pos	No	Driver	Team	Manufacturer	Points
1	8	Tyler Reddick	Richard Childress Racing	Chevrolet	10
2	24	William Byron	Hendrick Motorsports	Chevrolet	9
3	42	Ross Chastain	Chip Ganassi Racing	Chevrolet	8
4	5	Kyle Larson	Hendrick Motorsports	Chevrolet	7
5	1	Kurt Busch	Chip Ganassi Racing	Chevrolet	6
6	22	Joey Logano	Team Penske	Ford	5
7	4	Kevin Harvick	Stewart-Haas Racing	Ford	4
8	23	Bubba Wallace	23XI Racing	Toyota	3
9	77	Justin Haley (i)	Spire Motorsports	Chevrolet	0
10	18	Kyle Busch	Joe Gibbs Racing	Toyota	1
Official stage two results

=== Final Stage Results ===
Stage Three Laps: 33

Pos	Grid	No	Driver	Team	Manufacturer	Laps	Points
1	34	9	Chase Elliott	Hendrick Motorsports	Chevrolet	62	41
2	13	20	Christopher Bell	Joe Gibbs Racing	Toyota	62	39
3	40	18	Kyle Busch	Joe Gibbs Racing	Toyota	62	35
4	16	1	Kurt Busch	Chip Ganassi Racing	Chevrolet	62	41
5	6	11	Denny Hamlin	Joe Gibbs Racing	Toyota	62	37
6	35	14	Chase Briscoe (R)	Stewart-Haas Racing	Ford	62	31
7	8	42	Ross Chastain	Chip Ganassi Racing	Chevrolet	62	44
8	4	8	Tyler Reddick	Richard Childress Racing	Chevrolet	62	46
9	9	19	Martin Truex Jr.	Joe Gibbs Racing	Toyota	62	28
10	7	21	Matt DiBenedetto	Wood Brothers Racing	Ford	62	27
11	37	3	Austin Dillon	Richard Childress Racing	Chevrolet	62	26
12	38	47	Ricky Stenhouse Jr.	JTG Daugherty Racing	Chevrolet	62	25
13	20	2	Brad Keselowski	Team Penske	Ford	62	24
14	19	10	Aric Almirola	Stewart-Haas Racing	Ford	62	23
15	14	22	Joey Logano	Team Penske	Ford	62	27
16	2	5	Kyle Larson	Hendrick Motorsports	Chevrolet	62	36
17	15	41	Cole Custer	Stewart-Haas Racing	Ford	62	20
18	12	17	Chris Buescher	Roush Fenway Racing	Ford	62	19
19	21	43	Erik Jones	Richard Petty Motorsports	Chevrolet	62	18
20	17	12	Ryan Blaney	Team Penske	Ford	62	17
21	23	7	Corey LaJoie	Spire Motorsports	Chevrolet	62	16
22	10	48	Alex Bowman	Hendrick Motorsports	Chevrolet	62	18
23	27	52	Josh Bilicki	Rick Ware Racing	Chevrolet	62	14
24	36	23	Bubba Wallace	23XI Racing	Toyota	62	16
25	22	77	Justin Haley (i)	Spire Motorsports	Chevrolet	62	0
26	39	96	Ty Dillon (i)	Gaunt Brothers Racing	Toyota	62	0
27	25	4	Kevin Harvick	Stewart-Haas Racing	Ford	62	14
28	26	15	James Davison	Rick Ware Racing	Chevrolet	62	9
29	3	16	A. J. Allmendinger (i)	Kaulig Racing	Chevrolet	62	0
30	18	34	Michael McDowell	Front Row Motorsports	Ford	62	7
31	29	51	Cody Ware (i)	Petty Ware Racing	Chevrolet	62	0
32	28	6	Ryan Newman	Roush Fenway Racing	Ford	62	5
33	1	24	William Byron	Hendrick Motorsports	Chevrolet	62	23
34	33	00	Quin Houff	StarCom Racing	Chevrolet	61	3
35	30	78	Kyle Tilley	Live Fast Motorsports	Ford	60	2
36	11	99	Daniel Suárez	Trackhouse Racing Team	Chevrolet	53	1
37	24	38	Anthony Alfredo (R)	Front Row Motorsports	Ford	42	1
38	5	33	Austin Cindric (i)	Team Penske	Ford	35	0
39	31	53	Ryan Eversley	Rick Ware Racing	Chevrolet	27	1
40	32	37	Ryan Preece	JTG Daugherty Racing	Chevrolet	6	1
Official race results

=== Race statistics ===
- Lead changes: 10 among 8 different drivers
- Cautions/Laps: 4 for 9
- Red flags: 0
- Time of race: 2 hours, 54 minutes and 33 seconds
- Average speed: 86.271 miles per hour (138.840 km/h)

== Media ==
=== Television ===
NBC Sports covered the race on the television side. Rick Allen, Jeff Burton, Steve Letarte and Dale Earnhardt Jr. called the race from the broadcast booth. Dave Burns, Parker Kligerman and Marty Snider handled the pit road duties from pit lane. Jac Collinsworth handled the features from the track.

NBC
Booth announcers	Pit reporters	Features reporter
Lap-by-lap: Rick Allen; Color-commentator: Jeff Burton; Color-commentator: Steve Letarte; Color-commentator: Dale Earnhardt Jr.	Dave Burns; Parker Kligerman; Marty Snider	Jac Collinsworth

=== Radio ===
Radio coverage of the race was broadcast by Motor Racing Network (MRN) and simulcast on Sirius XM NASCAR Radio.

MRN
Booth announcers	Turn announcers	Pit reporters
Lead announcer: Alex Hayden; Announcer: Jeff Striegle	Turn 1 & 2: Steve Post; Turns 3 & 4: Dave Moody; Turns 5 & 6: Mike Bagley; Turns 7 & 8: Eric Morse; Turns 9 & 10: Jason Toy; Turn 11: Kyle Rickey; Turn 12: Kurt Becker; Turns 13 & 14: Tim Catalfamo	Pete Pistone; Kim Coon

== Standings after the race ==
Drivers' Championship standings

	Pos	Driver	Points
	1	Denny Hamlin	798
	2	Kyle Larson	795 (–3)
	3	William Byron	713 (–85)
1	4	Kyle Busch	685 (–113)
1	5	Joey Logano	678 (–120)
	6	Chase Elliott	674 (–124)
	7	Martin Truex Jr.	634 (–164)
	8	Ryan Blaney	603 (–195)
	9	Kevin Harvick	599 (–199)
	10	Brad Keselowski	593 (–205)
	11	Alex Bowman	561 (–237)
	12	Austin Dillon	544 (–254)
	13	Tyler Reddick	521 (–277)
	14	Kurt Busch	471 (–327)
1	15	Christopher Bell	463 (–335)
1	16	Chris Buescher	446 (–352)
Official driver's standings

Manufacturers' Championship standings

Pos	Manufacturer	Points
1	Chevrolet	742
2	Ford	686 (–56)
3	Toyota	685 (–57)

- Note: Only the first 16 positions are included for the driver standings.
- . – Driver has clinched a position in the NASCAR Cup Series playoffs.

Previous race: 2021 Explore the Pocono Mountains 350	NASCAR Cup Series; 2021 season	Next race: 2021 Quaker State 400
