= 2015 Pure Michigan 400 =

Race details
- Race 23 of 36 in the 2015 NASCAR Sprint Cup Series
- 2015 Pure Michigan 400 program cover
- Date: August 16, 2015
- Location: Michigan International Speedway in Brooklyn, Michigan
- Course: Permanent racing facility
- Course length: 2 miles (3.2 km)
- Distance: 200 laps, 400 mi (640 km)
- Weather: Clear blue skies with a temperature of 83 °F (28 °C); wind out of the southwest at 7 mph (11 km/h)
- Average speed: 143.455 mph (230.868 km/h)

Pole position
Driver	Matt Kenseth	Joe Gibbs Racing
- Time: 36.458

Most laps led
Driver	Matt Kenseth	Joe Gibbs Racing
- Laps: 146

Winner
No. 20	Matt Kenseth	Joe Gibbs Racing

Television in the United States
- Network: NBCSN
- Announcers: Rick Allen, Jeff Burton, and Steve Letarte
- Nielsen ratings: 2.4/5 (Overnight); 2.4/5 (Final); 4.3 Million viewers

Radio in the United States
- Radio: MRN
- Booth announcers: Joe Moore, Jeff Striegle and Rusty Wallace
- Turn announcers: Dave Moody (1 & 2) and Kurt Becker (3 & 4)

The 2015 Pure Michigan 400 was a NASCAR Sprint Cup Series race held on August 16, 2015, at Michigan International Speedway in Brooklyn, Michigan. Contested over 200 laps on the 2 mile (3.2 km) D–shaped oval, it was the 23rd race of the 2015 NASCAR Sprint Cup Series season. Matt Kenseth won the race, his third of the season. Kevin Harvick finished second. Martin Truex Jr. finished third. Austin Dillon and Denny Hamlin rounded out the top five.

Kenseth won the pole for the race and led 146 laps on his way to victory lane. There were 16 lead changes among eight different drivers as well as eight caution flag periods for 31 laps.

This was the 34th career victory for Matt Kenseth, third of the season, third at Michigan International Speedway and eighth at the track for Joe Gibbs Racing. Despite being the winning manufacturer, Toyota left Michigan trailing Chevrolet by 70–points in the manufacturer standings. However, they usurped second in the standings from Ford.

The Pure Michigan 400 was carried by NBC Sports on the cable/satellite NBCSN network for the American television audience. The radio broadcast for the race was carried by the Motor Racing Network and Sirius XM NASCAR Radio.

== Report ==
=== Background ===
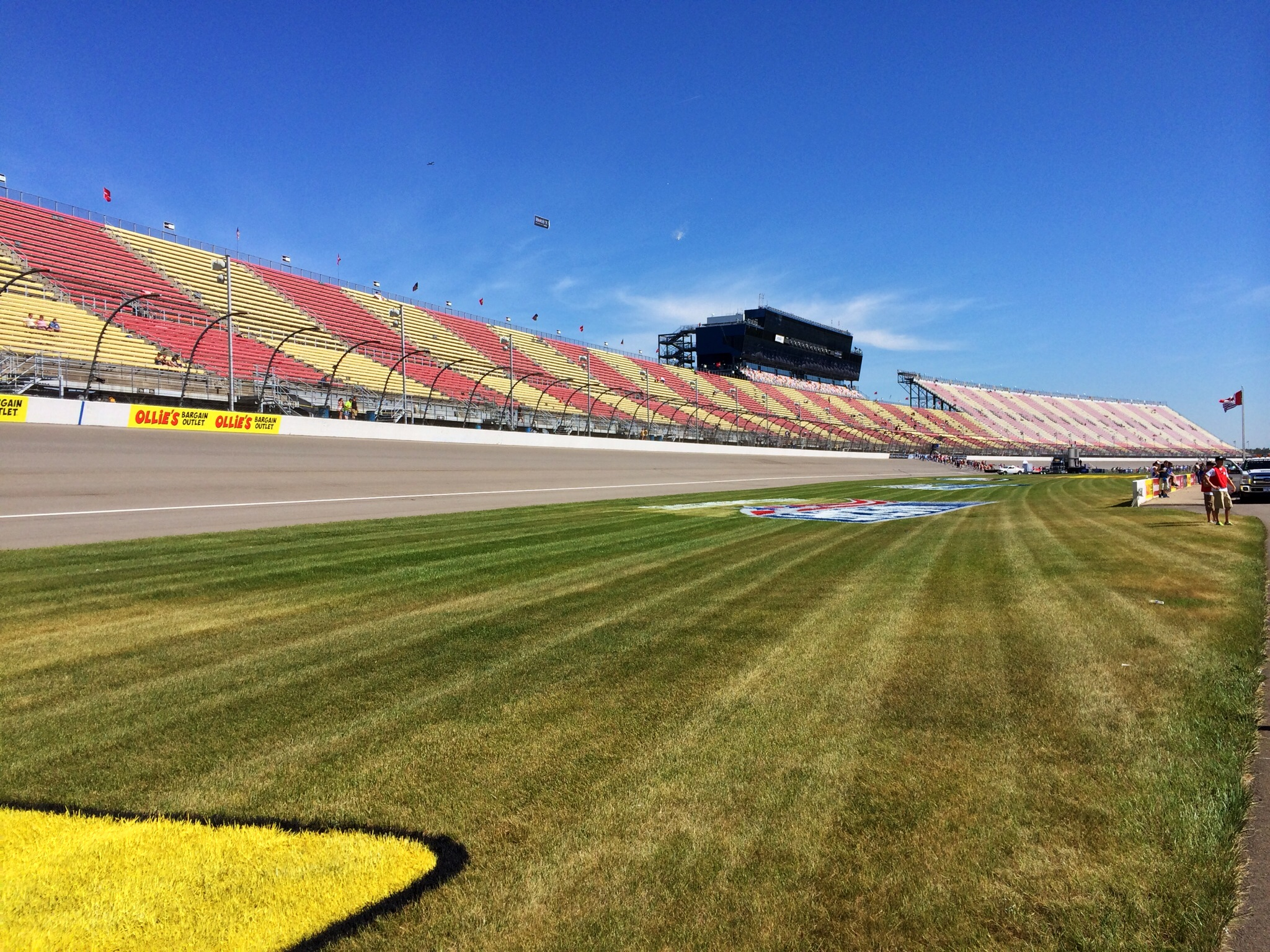
Michigan International Speedway, the track where the race was held.

Michigan International Speedway is a 2.000 mi (3.219 km) D-shaped oval superspeedway in Cambridge Township, Michigan, just south of the village of Brooklyn. Kevin Harvick entered Michigan with a 42–point lead over Joey Logano. Dale Earnhardt Jr. entered 73 back. Jimmie Johnson entered 76 back. Brad Keselowski entered 104 back.

==== Aero package ====
For the weekend's race, NASCAR used the same high–drag package that was used at the Indianapolis Motor Speedway. One change from the Indy package included an additional air duct mandated on the right–side window of the car. Previously, this was an option left up to the teams. What led NASCAR to mandating this was the excessive heat buildup in the cars caused by the high–downforce package. "I would not be surprised to see a lot of car failures this weekend, specific to heat relation as it pertains to the aero package and its kind of cause and effects," Brad Keselowski said during a teleconference Tuesday. "And inside the car I would not be surprised to see a lot of hot and worn out drivers after the race. We all know we’re in for a handful of the race."

==== Entry list ====
The entry list for the Pure Michigan 400 was released on Monday, August 10 at 10:31 a.m. Eastern time. Forty-four cars were entered for the race. All but the No. 21 Wood Brothers Racing Ford were entered in the previous week's race at Watkins Glen. The four driver changes for this race were Josh Wise returning to the No. 32 Go FAS Racing Ford, Travis Kvapil driving the No. 33 Hillman-Circle Sport LLC Chevrolet, Brett Moffitt returning to the No. 34 Front Row Motorsports Ford and Reed Sorenson returning to the No. 62 Premium Motorsports Chevrolet.

No.	Driver	Team	Manufacturer
1	Jamie McMurray	Chip Ganassi Racing	Chevrolet
2	Brad Keselowski (PC3)	Team Penske	Ford
3	Austin Dillon	Richard Childress Racing	Chevrolet
4	Kevin Harvick (PC1)	Stewart–Haas Racing	Chevrolet
5	Kasey Kahne	Hendrick Motorsports	Chevrolet
6	Trevor Bayne	Roush Fenway Racing	Ford
7	Alex Bowman	Tommy Baldwin Racing	Chevrolet
9	Sam Hornish Jr.	Richard Petty Motorsports	Ford
10	Danica Patrick	Stewart–Haas Racing	Chevrolet
11	Denny Hamlin	Joe Gibbs Racing	Toyota
13	Casey Mears	Germain Racing	Chevrolet
14	Tony Stewart (PC4)	Stewart–Haas Racing	Chevrolet
15	Clint Bowyer	Michael Waltrip Racing	Toyota
16	Greg Biffle	Roush Fenway Racing	Ford
17	Ricky Stenhouse Jr.	Roush Fenway Racing	Ford
18	Kyle Busch	Joe Gibbs Racing	Toyota
19	Carl Edwards	Joe Gibbs Racing	Toyota
20	Matt Kenseth (PC6)	Joe Gibbs Racing	Toyota
21	Ryan Blaney (i)	Wood Brothers Racing	Ford
22	Joey Logano	Team Penske	Ford
23	J. J. Yeley (i)	BK Racing	Toyota
24	Jeff Gordon (PC7)	Hendrick Motorsports	Chevrolet
26	Jeb Burton (R)	BK Racing	Toyota
27	Paul Menard	Richard Childress Racing	Chevrolet
31	Ryan Newman	Richard Childress Racing	Chevrolet
32	Josh Wise	Go FAS Racing	Ford
33	Travis Kvapil (i)	Hillman-Circle Sport LLC	Chevrolet
34	Brett Moffitt (R)	Front Row Motorsports	Ford
35	Cole Whitt	Front Row Motorsports	Ford
38	David Gilliland	Front Row Motorsports	Ford
40	Landon Cassill (i)	Hillman-Circle Sport LLC	Chevrolet
41	Kurt Busch (PC5)	Stewart–Haas Racing	Chevrolet
42	Kyle Larson	Chip Ganassi Racing	Chevrolet
43	Aric Almirola	Richard Petty Motorsports	Ford
46	Michael Annett	HScott Motorsports	Chevrolet
47	A. J. Allmendinger	JTG Daugherty Racing	Chevrolet
48	Jimmie Johnson (PC2)	Hendrick Motorsports	Chevrolet
51	Justin Allgaier	HScott Motorsports	Chevrolet
55	David Ragan	Michael Waltrip Racing	Toyota
62	Reed Sorenson	Premium Motorsports	Chevrolet
78	Martin Truex Jr.	Furniture Row Racing	Chevrolet
83	Matt DiBenedetto (R)	BK Racing	Toyota
88	Dale Earnhardt Jr.	Hendrick Motorsports	Chevrolet
98	Timmy Hill (i)	Premium Motorsports	Ford
Official initial entry list
Official final entry list

Key	Meaning
(R)	Rookie
(i)	Ineligible for points
(PC#)	Past champions provisional

== Practice ==
=== First practice ===
Carl Edwards was the fastest in the first practice session with a time of 36.726 and a speed of 196.046 mph (315.505 km/h).

Pos	No.	Driver	Team	Manufacturer	Time	Speed
1	19	Carl Edwards	Joe Gibbs Racing	Toyota	36.726	196.046
2	4	Kevin Harvick	Stewart–Haas Racing	Chevrolet	36.950	194.858
3	3	Austin Dillon	Richard Childress Racing	Chevrolet	36.984	194.679
Official first practice results

=== Second practice ===
Kevin Harvick was the fastest in the second practice session with a time of 36.964 and a speed of 194.784 mph (313.474 km/h).

Pos	No.	Driver	Team	Manufacturer	Time	Speed
1	4	Kevin Harvick	Stewart–Haas Racing	Chevrolet	36.964	194.784
2	20	Matt Kenseth	Joe Gibbs Racing	Toyota	37.035	194.411
3	42	Kyle Larson	Chip Ganassi Racing	Chevrolet	37.111	194.013
Official second practice results

=== Final practice ===
Martin Truex Jr. was the fastest in the final practice session with a time of 37.553 and a speed of 191.729 mph (308.558 km/h). In the first five minutes of the session, Kyle Busch's car got loose exiting turn 4, slid down through the grass and destroyed the splitter. This forced the No. 18 team to roll out his backup car. As a result, he started the race from the rear of the field. “I was just running along, everything was fine and I was actually feeling pretty good about it,” Busch said. “Just started to get a little free up off of (turn) four. It started stepping out like it did here in the spring. I over-corrected and hit the wall so this time around I just kind of made it keep rotating and head down towards the infield. I think we need more grass at these race tracks, I think the apron should be full of grass.” In the final few minutes of the session, Austin Dillon reported that his engine had "No RPM's" and was forced to change engines. As a result, he too started the race from the rear of the field.

Pos	No.	Driver	Team	Manufacturer	Time	Speed
1	78	Martin Truex Jr.	Furniture Row Racing	Chevrolet	37.553	191.729
2	22	Joey Logano	Team Penske	Ford	37.654	191.215
3	19	Carl Edwards	Joe Gibbs Racing	Toyota	37.659	191.189
Official final practice results

== Qualifying ==
Matt Kenseth won the pole with a time of 36.458 and a speed of 197.488 mph (317.826 km/h). "We’ve had a fast racecar here this weekend," said Kenseth. "Hopefully, we can work on it in practice and get it ready to race. Having the No. 1 starting spot is great." "We aren’t first so we aren’t satisfied," said Joey Logano. "Qualifying here is very interesting. I had my hands full, I can tell you that much. I was sawing away at it but we'll be close enough to the front to get a good pit stall, so the guys have that going for them. We'll go to work on dialing it in some more during practice." "Tomorrow (Saturday), we'll run more around other cars and learn more about what the (aero) package is going to be like for the race," Jeff Gordon said of the new rules package. "We won’t truly know until they drop the green and there are 43 cars going into Turn 1."

=== Qualifying results ===
Pos	No.	Driver	Team	Manufacturer	R1	R2
1	20	Matt Kenseth	Joe Gibbs Racing	Toyota	36.737	36.458
2	11	Denny Hamlin	Joe Gibbs Racing	Toyota	36.822	36.550
3	19	Carl Edwards	Joe Gibbs Racing	Toyota	36.757	36.683
4	3	Austin Dillon (Note: Austin Dillon started from the rear of the field for changing engines.)	Richard Childress Racing	Chevrolet	36.995	36.750
5	14	Tony Stewart	Stewart–Haas Racing	Chevrolet	36.900	36.833
6	18	Kyle Busch (Note: Kyle Busch started from the rear of the field for switching to a backup car post-qualifying.)	Joe Gibbs Racing	Toyota	36.804	36.838
7	4	Kevin Harvick	Stewart–Haas Racing	Chevrolet	36.976	36.876
8	48	Jimmie Johnson	Hendrick Motorsports	Chevrolet	37.083	36.880
9	88	Dale Earnhardt Jr.	Hendrick Motorsports	Chevrolet	37.159	36.945
10	22	Joey Logano	Team Penske	Ford	37.011	37.036
11	5	Kasey Kahne	Hendrick Motorsports	Chevrolet	37.159	37.088
12	15	Clint Bowyer	Michael Waltrip Racing	Toyota	37.176	37.189
13	55	David Ragan	Michael Waltrip Racing	Toyota	37.184	—
14	2	Brad Keselowski	Team Penske	Ford	37.199	—
15	9	Sam Hornish Jr.	Richard Petty Motorsports	Ford	37.214	—
16	41	Kurt Busch	Stewart–Haas Racing	Chevrolet	37.246	—
17	31	Ryan Newman	Richard Childress Racing	Chevrolet	37.246	—
18	1	Jamie McMurray	Chip Ganassi Racing	Chevrolet	37.277	—
19	21	Ryan Blaney (i)	Wood Brothers Racing	Ford	37.281	—
20	16	Greg Biffle	Roush Fenway Racing	Ford	37.300	—
21	24	Jeff Gordon	Hendrick Motorsports	Chevrolet	37.304	—
22	78	Martin Truex Jr.	Furniture Row Racing	Chevrolet	37.321	—
23	10	Danica Patrick	Stewart–Haas Racing	Chevrolet	37.350	—
24	27	Paul Menard	Richard Childress Racing	Chevrolet	37.379	—
25	6	Trevor Bayne	Roush Fenway Racing	Ford	37.499	—
26	47	A. J. Allmendinger	JTG Daugherty Racing	Chevrolet	37.534	—
27	17	Ricky Stenhouse Jr.	Roush Fenway Racing	Ford	37.581	—
28	51	Justin Allgaier	HScott Motorsports	Chevrolet	37.624	—
29	26	Jeb Burton (R)	BK Racing	Toyota	37.753	—
30	43	Aric Almirola	Richard Petty Motorsports	Ford	37.790	—
31	40	Landon Cassill (i)	Hillman-Circle Sport LLC	Chevrolet	37.885	—
32	83	Matt DiBenedetto (R)	BK Racing	Toyota	37.885	—
33	7	Alex Bowman	Tommy Baldwin Racing	Chevrolet	38.018	—
34	42	Kyle Larson	Chip Ganassi Racing	Chevrolet	38.049	—
35	35	Cole Whitt	Front Row Motorsports	Ford	38.077	—
36	38	David Gilliland	Front Row Motorsports	Ford	38.110	—
37	23	J. J. Yeley (i)	BK Racing	Toyota	38.145	—
38	34	Brett Moffitt (R)	Front Row Motorsports	Ford	38.193	—
39	46	Michael Annett	HScott Motorsports	Chevrolet	38.302	—
40	13	Casey Mears	Germain Racing	Chevrolet	38.599	—
41	32	Josh Wise	Go FAS Racing	Ford	38.705	—
42	33	Travis Kvapil (i) (Note: Travis Kvapil started from the rear of the field for changing engines.)	Hillman-Circle Sport LLC	Chevrolet	39.200	—
43	98	Timmy Hill (i)	Premium Motorsports	Ford	39.335	—
Failed to qualify
44	62	Reed Sorenson	Premium Motorsports	Chevrolet	38.631	—
Official qualifying results

== Race ==
=== First half ===
==== Start ====
Just as the field began rolling off pit road, Timmy Hill blew his engine and went to the garage before the green flag flew.

The race was scheduled to start at 2:46 p.m., but started nine minutes later when Matt Kenseth led the field to the green flag. The first caution of the race flew the same lap when David Ragan got sideways and spun through the infield grass while heading into turn 1.

The race restarted on lap 6. The second caution of the race flew on lap 10 for debris in turn 3. The debris was an oil pan that came off Hill's car, which recently returned to the race.

The race restarted on lap 14. The third caution of the race flew on lap 21 as a scheduled competition caution. Austin Dillon opted not to pit and assumed the lead. Kasey Kahne was tagged for speeding on pit road and restarted from the tail-end of the field.

The race restarted on lap 25. Dillon surrendered the lead to pit on lap 41 and handed it back to Kenseth. Jimmie Johnson made an unscheduled stop on lap 49 for a flat right-rear tire. He rejoined the race in 42nd two laps down. Casey Mears hit pit road on lap 54 after his engine gave way. Kenseth ducked onto pit road on lap 59 and handed the lead to Kyle Larson, who pitted the next lap and handed the lead to Jeff Gordon. He hit pit road the next time by and gave the lead to Kyle Busch. Busch pitted the next lap and gave the lead back to Kenseth. Michael Annett was tagged for having his pit crew over the wall too soon and was forced to serve a drive-through penalty.

==== Second quarter ====
The fourth caution of the race came out on lap 72 for debris in turn 2.

The race restarted on lap 77. Matt Kenseth hit pit road on lap 99 and handed the lead to Kevin Harvick.

=== Second half ===
==== Halfway ====
Harvick ran out of gas on lap 114 on his way to pit road. Carl Edwards assumed the lead. He pitted on lap 116 and handed the lead to Kenseth. Debris in turn 1 brought out the fifth caution of the race on lap 121. Edwards opted not to pit and assumed the lead.

The race restarted on lap 126. Edwards botched the restart and teammate Kenseth shot past Austin Dillon to retake the lead. The sixth caution of the race flew when Clint Bowyer got turned into the wall while exiting turn 2, came down across the nose of Ryan Newman, slid down the track and rear-ended the inside wall on the backstretch. "Man, I'm sorry guys," Bowyer radioed to his team. "I couldn't save it. Good track for us."

The race restarted on lap 131. The seventh caution of the race flew on lap 136 when Tony Stewart got loose and spun down onto pit road and Ryan Blaney, trying to avoid hitting him, made contact with the wall. Edwards had an engine misfire under the caution and fell from second to 12th.

==== Fourth quarter ====
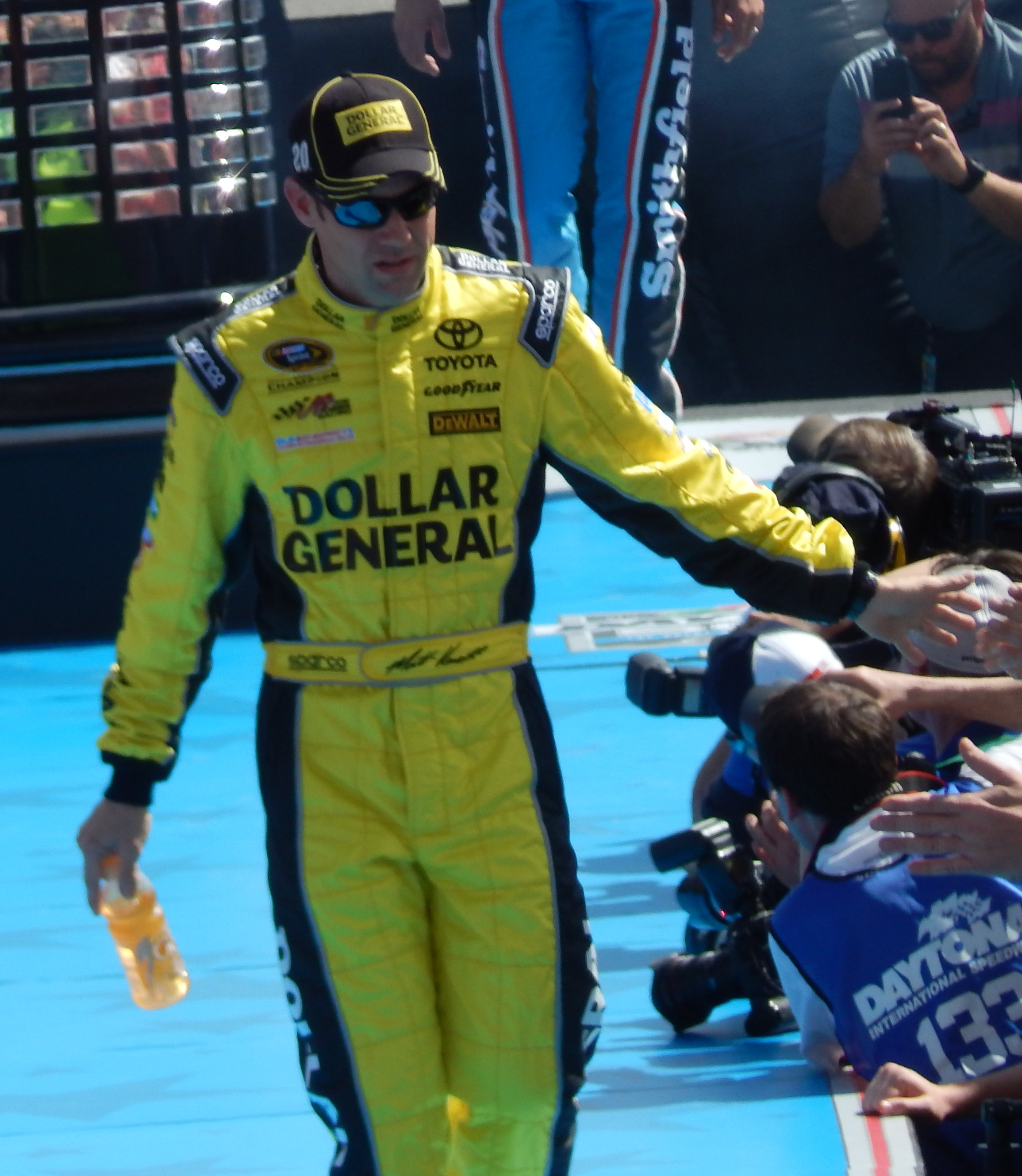
Matt Kenseth, seen here at the 2015 Daytona 500, scored the 34th victory of his career at Michigan.

The race restarted with 59 laps to go. A number of cars began hitting pit road to make their final stop with 38 laps to go. Kenseth gave up the lead to pit with 36 laps to go and handed it to Busch. He pitted with 28 laps to go and handed the lead to Aric Almirola. He pitted with 25 laps to go and the lead cycled back to Kenseth.

The eighth caution of the race flew with 17 laps to go when Johnson got loose in turn 3 and damaged his car's splitter.

The race restarted with 13 laps to go and Matt Kenseth drove off to score his 34th career victory.

== Post-race ==
=== Driver comments ===
"We've had a great couple months," said Kenseth. "We definitely have momentum. The guys gave us a rocket today. We're going to work hard to keep it rolling."

“We just fought a lot of things today,” Harvick said. “Just really proud of everybody on our Jimmy John’s/Budweiser Chevrolet for working hard today. We had some handling issues at the beginning of the race and then they were able to really make the car handle a lot better and then we overcame the running out of gas there and we were able to put ourselves back in position up in the front. The No. 20 (Kenseth) was the class of the field today, but everybody on our Jimmy John’s team did a great job.”

“Yeah, we had some circumstances where we had to start at the back and had to figure out a way to get our track position back, and just got to thank my guys,” said Austin Dillon after scoring his best career finish of fourth. "(Crew chief) Slugger Labbe and the engineers did a good job coming up with a plan. That first 20 laps was no fun for us because we had to ride around and try and stay in front of the leader, but we saved gas and decided to not come down on that first competition caution for fuel, and it worked out. It showed that our car was fast enough to stay up there, pitted, drove back up to where we needed to be, and man, it was a fun day for us, the Dow car was fast, and I felt like I passed a lot of cars, also, getting into fourth.”

“We passed a lot of cars, we just couldn’t ever get that track position to fight for the win,” Martin Truex Jr. told NBCSN after the race. “We felt like we were maybe as good as the No. 20 (winner, Matt Kenseth), close at least, and it would have been nice to see if we could have fought it out with him.”

=== Media comments ===
“I continue to applaud NASCAR for trying rule packages in an effort to improve the competition. But after two tries it’s apparent the high drag package used at Indianapolis and Michigan is not the right direction. Drivers were skeptical all weekend about being able to pass thanks to the impact of the higher spoiler and other aero changes made to how cars handled. It played out in Sunday’s race with passes for the lead minimal and most of the day spent calculating strategies on pit road. While the lower downforce package received rave reviews and will be used again at Darlington on Labor Day weekend, it’s safe to say the days of the high drag aero rules are endangered to say the least.’’

— Motor Racing Network lead writer and co-host of The Morning Drive on Sirius XM NASCAR Radio Pete Pistone giving his thoughts on the new aero package.

Members of the NASCAR media gave their thoughts on the high-downforce package used for this race. Pete Pistone, lead writer for MRN.com and co-host of The Morning Drive on Sirius XM NASCAR Radio, said that he continued "to applaud NASCAR for trying rule packages in an effort to improve the competition" but that "it’s apparent the high drag package used at Indianapolis and Michigan is not the right direction."

Jerry Jordan of Frontstretch.com said that "it didn’t seem to produce the desired results at Michigan International Speedway" but that he did "applaud NASCAR for trying something new and wanting to make the racing better – and safer – on the track."

Jim Utter of Motorsport.com was less kind in his opinion of the rules package in saying that it "was a complete failure at its debut at Indianapolis Motor Speedway last month and again in Sunday’s Pure Michigan 400 at Michigan International Speedway" and that "restarts were the only thing that created any drama in either race."

Monte Dutton of Bleacher Report stated that "NASCAR’s rules geniuses botched the package used in the Pure Michigan 400."

== Race results ==
Pos	No.	Driver	Team	Manufacturer	Laps	Points
1	20	Matt Kenseth	Joe Gibbs Racing	Toyota	200	48
2	4	Kevin Harvick	Stewart–Haas Racing	Chevrolet	200	43
3	78	Martin Truex Jr.	Furniture Row Racing	Chevrolet	200	41
4	3	Austin Dillon	Richard Childress Racing	Chevrolet	200	41
5	11	Denny Hamlin	Joe Gibbs Racing	Toyota	200	39
6	19	Carl Edwards	Joe Gibbs Racing	Toyota	200	39
7	22	Joey Logano	Team Penske	Ford	200	37
8	31	Ryan Newman	Richard Childress Racing	Chevrolet	200	36
9	2	Brad Keselowski	Team Penske	Ford	200	35
10	88	Dale Earnhardt Jr.	Hendrick Motorsports	Chevrolet	200	34
11	18	Kyle Busch	Joe Gibbs Racing	Toyota	200	34
12	27	Paul Menard	Richard Childress Racing	Chevrolet	200	32
13	42	Kyle Larson	Chip Ganassi Racing	Chevrolet	200	31
14	43	Aric Almirola	Richard Petty Motorsports	Ford	200	31
15	5	Kasey Kahne	Hendrick Motorsports	Chevrolet	200	29
16	1	Jamie McMurray	Chip Ganassi Racing	Chevrolet	200	28
17	24	Jeff Gordon	Hendrick Motorsports	Chevrolet	200	28
18	55	David Ragan	Michael Waltrip Racing	Toyota	200	26
19	9	Sam Hornish Jr.	Richard Petty Motorsports	Ford	200	25
20	41	Kurt Busch	Stewart–Haas Racing	Chevrolet	199	24
21	14	Tony Stewart	Stewart–Haas Racing	Chevrolet	199	23
22	6	Trevor Bayne	Roush Fenway Racing	Ford	198	22
23	16	Greg Biffle	Roush Fenway Racing	Ford	198	21
24	21	Ryan Blaney (i)	Wood Brothers Racing	Ford	198	0
25	10	Danica Patrick	Stewart–Haas Racing	Chevrolet	198	19
26	17	Ricky Stenhouse Jr.	Roush Fenway Racing	Ford	198	18
27	35	Cole Whitt	Front Row Motorsports	Ford	198	17
28	47	A. J. Allmendinger	JTG Daugherty Racing	Chevrolet	198	16
29	51	Justin Allgaier	HScott Motorsports	Chevrolet	197	15
30	83	Matt DiBenedetto (R)	BK Racing	Toyota	197	14
31	7	Alex Bowman	Tommy Baldwin Racing	Chevrolet	197	13
32	38	David Gilliland	Front Row Motorsports	Ford	197	12
33	26	Jeb Burton (R)	BK Racing	Toyota	197	11
34	34	Brett Moffitt (R)	Front Row Motorsports	Ford	197	10
35	46	Michael Annett	HScott Motorsports	Chevrolet	197	9
36	40	Landon Cassill (i)	Hillman-Circle Sport LLC	Chevrolet	196	0
37	32	Josh Wise	Go FAS Racing	Ford	196	7
38	23	J. J. Yeley (i)	BK Racing	Toyota	194	0
39	48	Jimmie Johnson	Hendrick Motorsports	Chevrolet	190	5
40	33	Travis Kvapil (i)	Hillman-Circle Sport LLC	Chevrolet	190	0
41	15	Clint Bowyer	Michael Waltrip Racing	Toyota	164	4
42	13	Casey Mears	Germain Racing	Chevrolet	51	2
43	98	Timmy Hill (i)	Premium Motorsports	Ford	9	0
Official Pure Michigan 400 results

=== Race statistics ===
- 16 lead changes among 8 different drivers
- 8 cautions for 31 laps
- Time of race: 2 hours, 47 minute, 18 seconds
- Average speed: 143.455 mph (230.868 km/h)
- Matt Kenseth took home $226.586 in winnings

Lap Leaders
Laps	Leader
1-22	Matt Kenseth
23-40	Austin Dillon
41-59	Matt Kenseth
60	Jeff Gordon
61-62	Kyle Busch
63-75	Matt Kenseth
76	Clint Bowyer
77-98	Matt Kenseth
99-113	Kevin Harvick
114-116	Carl Edwards
117-122	Matt Kenseth
123-124	Carl Edwards
125	Austin Dillon
126-164	Matt Kenseth
165-172	Kyle Busch
173-175	Aric Almirola
176-200	Matt Kenseth

Total laps led
Leader	Laps
Matt Kenseth	146
Austin Dillon	19
Kevin Harvick	15
Kyle Busch	10
Carl Edwards	5
Aric Almirola	3
Jeff Gordon	1
Clint Bowyer	1

==== Race awards ====
- Coors Light Pole Award: Matt Kenseth (36.458, 197.488 mph (317.826 km/h))
- 3M Lap Leader: Matt Kenseth (146 laps)
- American Ethanol Green Flag Restart Award: Matt Kenseth
- Duralast Brakes "Bake In The Race" Award: Matt Kenseth
- Freescale "Wide Open": Kevin Harvick
- Ingersoll Rand Power Move: Ryan Newman (5 positions)
- MAHLE Clevite Engine Builder of the Race: Toyota Racing Development #20
- Mobil 1 Driver of the Race: Matt Kenseth (148.8 driver rating)
- Moog Steering and Suspension Problem Solver of The Race: Kevin Harvick (crew chief Rodney Childers (0.300 seconds))
- NASCAR Sprint Cup Leader Bonus: No winner: rolls over to $200,000 at next event
- Sherwin-Williams Fastest Lap: Austin Dillon (Lap 26, 37.985, 189.549 mph (305.050 km/h))
- Sunoco Rookie of The Race: Matt DiBenedetto

== Media ==
=== Television ===
NBC Sports covered the race on the television side. Rick Allen, Jeff Burton and Steve Letarte had the call in the booth for the race. Dave Burns, Mike Massaro, Marty Snider and Kelli Stavast handled pit road on the television side.

NBCSN
Booth announcers	Pit reporters
Lap-by-lap: Rick Allen; Color-commentator: Jeff Burton; Color-commentator: Steve Letarte	Dave Burns; Mike Massaro; Marty Snider; Kelli Stavast

=== Radio ===
MRN had the radio call for the race, which was simulcast on Sirius XM NASCAR Radio. Joe Moore, Jeff Striegle and five–time Michigan winner Rusty Wallace called the race from the booth when the field was racing down the front stretch. Dave Moody called the race from a billboard outside of turn 2 when the field was racing through turns 1 and 2. Kurt Becker called the race from a platform outside of turn 3 when the field was racing through turns 3 and 4. Alex Hayden, Winston Kelley and Pete Pistone worked pit road for MRN.

MRN
Booth announcers	Turn announcers	Pit reporters
Lead announcer: Joe Moore; Announcer: Jeff Striegle; Announcer: Rusty Wallace	Turns 1 & 2: Dave Moody; Turns 3 & 4: Kurt Becker	Alex Hayden; Winston Kelley; Pete Pistone

== Standings after the race ==
Drivers' Championship standings

	Pos	Driver	Points
	1	Kevin Harvick	866
	2	Joey Logano	818 (–48)
	3	Dale Earnhardt Jr.	784 (–82)
2	4	Martin Truex Jr.	755 (–111)
	5	Brad Keselowski	754 (–112)
2	6	Jimmie Johnson	752 (–114)
	7	Matt Kenseth	751 (–115)
	8	Kurt Busch	683 (–183)
1	9	Denny Hamlin	670 (–196)
1	10	Jamie McMurray	663 (–203)
	11	Paul Menard	654 (–212)
1	12	Ryan Newman	649 (–217)
1	13	Jeff Gordon	648 (–218)
1	14	Carl Edwards	628 (–238)
1	15	Clint Bowyer	616 (–250)
	16	Aric Almirola	593 (–273)

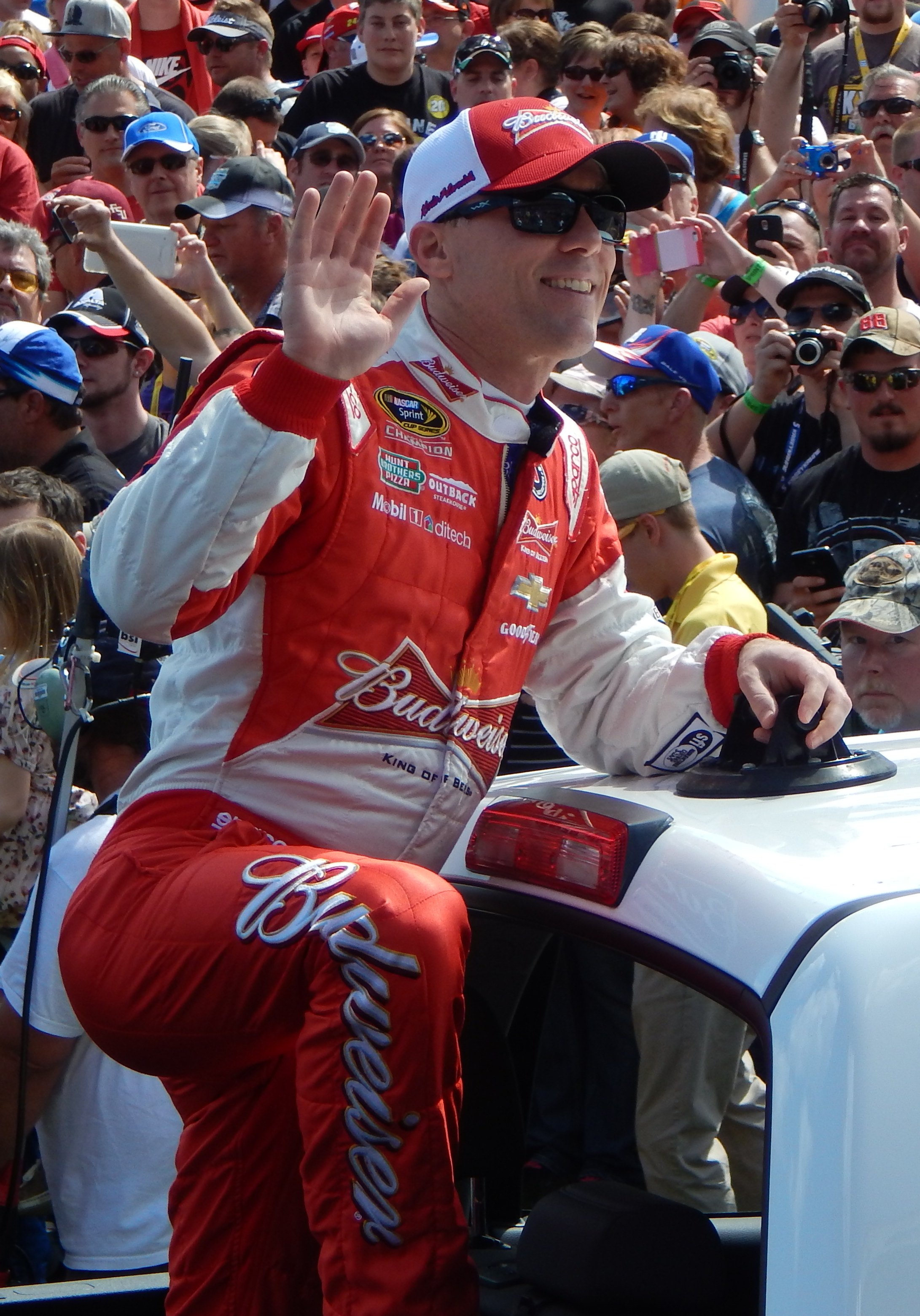
Kevin Harvick left Michigan with a 48–point lead over Joey Logano.

Manufacturers' Championship standings

	Pos	Manufacturer	Points
	1	Chevrolet	1,024
1	2	Toyota	954 (–70)
1	3	Ford	948 (–76)

- Note: Only the first sixteen positions are included for the driver standings.

== Notes ==
Previous race: 2015 Cheez-It 355 at The Glen	Sprint Cup Series; 2015 season	Next race: 2015 Irwin Tools Night Race
