= Pete Pistone =

American motorsports journalist and commentator

Personal information
- Nicknames: Pistol Pete; Paisan
- Nationality: American
- Born: June 2, 1964 (age 62) Chicago
- Education: Northern Illinois University
- Occupation(s): NASCAR commentator Pit reporter Radio show host
- Years active: 1986–present
- Employer(s): Motor Racing Network; Sirius XM; MLB.com
- Other interests: Chicago Bears, Chicago Blackhawks, Chicago Bulls, Chicago Cubs
- Updated on December 29, 2015

Pete Pistone is an American motorsports journalist and commentator who works for the Motor Racing Network. He is the lead writer for MRN.com and has worked for the radio network since 2009 after they purchased RacingOne.com. Since 2009, Pistone has been a co-host of the nationally syndicated Sirius XM show The Morning Drive on Sirius XM NASCAR Radio.

== Early years ==
Born in Chicago, Pistone became "exposed to racing from day one because my family was in the sport (being his uncle Tom Pistone was a NASCAR Sprint Cup Series driver and winner in the 1950s). I spent one summer with Tiger when he was running the old late model sportsman division and I remember riding in the race car with my cousins on a hauler going to track after track after track on a nightly basis. When I got old enough to get my license the Chicago and Midwest short track world was my oyster and places like Grundy County Speedway, Illiana Speedway, Slinger Speedway were regular trips as well as following the old ARTGO Series and ASA. I landed the track announcer job at Rockford Speedway thanks to the Deery family and would drive there twice a week from our northwest suburban Chicago home to announce as well as at special races."

== Journalistic career ==
After graduating from Northern Illinois University, Pistone spent 10 years hosting a weekly motorsports show called "Victory Lane" on Chicagoland Television. In 1997, he was hired by the Chicago Sun-Times and spent six years as the motorsports reporter/columnist for the paper where he covered NASCAR and other forms of racing. In 2003, he was hired at the same position by CBSSports.com where he spent the next six years. In 2001, he along with fellow Chicago native Jeff Wackerlin worked at RacingOne.com which he described as "one of the first of its kind during the blossoming era of the Internet. It was a new experience writing and reporting in the online world and not in the more traditional manner of print or broadcast and to say there were some growing pains is an understatement. We had to prove to sanctioning bodies like NASCAR and IndyCar that we were legitimate media in order receive access and there were a number of tracks that wouldn't grant us credentials because they didn't recognize the scope or depth of digital reporting back then. In fact (David) Poole was a help in getting some tracks to allow us access. Long story short the original group sold the company, which wasn't unique in the relatively early Internet days, and we went through a number of different ownership groups to keep going. Finally International Speedway Corporation (ISC) bought us and in time the site changed over to be aligned with MRN and amplify the radio network as a digital property. Since I had broadcasting experience as well as my writing and reporting background, our network president David Hyatt gave me a shot at working on air as a pit reporter in addition to creating content for the site. So over my years I've become a hybrid reporter for the network and company and get to work in the best of both worlds for me in both on-air and digital roles."

=== Motor Racing Network ===
After MRN took over RacingOne.com in 2009, Pistone joined the network as a writer and pit reporter. His first race for the radio network was a Camping World Truck Series race at Martinsville Speedway. He says of the event that he "didn't sleep the night before and had memorized every driver, team, sponsor and piece of data I could get my hands on, even though I was working P3 and in reality had about 11 trucks to cover. I had Rick Crawford as my pre-race interview target because he was making an historic start in his career and let me tell you when Barney Hall gave the wind-up and said 'Rick's standing by with our Pete Pistone of Chicago, Illinois' I nearly lost it. Thankfully the words formed for my question and Rick, the nicest guy in the world, started his answer by welcoming me to the MRN family. The rest of the broadcast went well and I will always remember being on pit road with Alex Hayden and Steve Post plus working with Barney, Joe Moore and Dave Moody that day as a highlight in my life."

== Sirius XM ==
Since July 6, 2009, Pistone has been the co-host of The Morning Drive on Sirius XM NASCAR Radio with Mike Bagley. He took over as co-host following the death of David Poole. Even before joining the Sirius XM lineup, he had been a weekly guest on Sirius XM Speedway with Dave Moody since 2004. On Saturday mornings during the season, he co-hosts a show that helps callers set a lineup for fantasy NASCAR events. In addition to Sirius XM NASCAR, Pistone is a regular guest/host on Sirius XM Bleacher Report Radio where he discusses NASCAR and stick and ball sports.

Unlike his co-host Bagley, Pistone is known for being snarky and having a low tolerance for nonsense like his other MRN colleague Moody.

== Personal life ==
Pistone resides in a suburb near the city of Chicago with his wife Michelle and daughter Mia. Being a lifelong fan of the Chicago Cubs, he also works as a Cubs beat reporter for MLB.com.
