= Michael James Lewis =

American racing driver

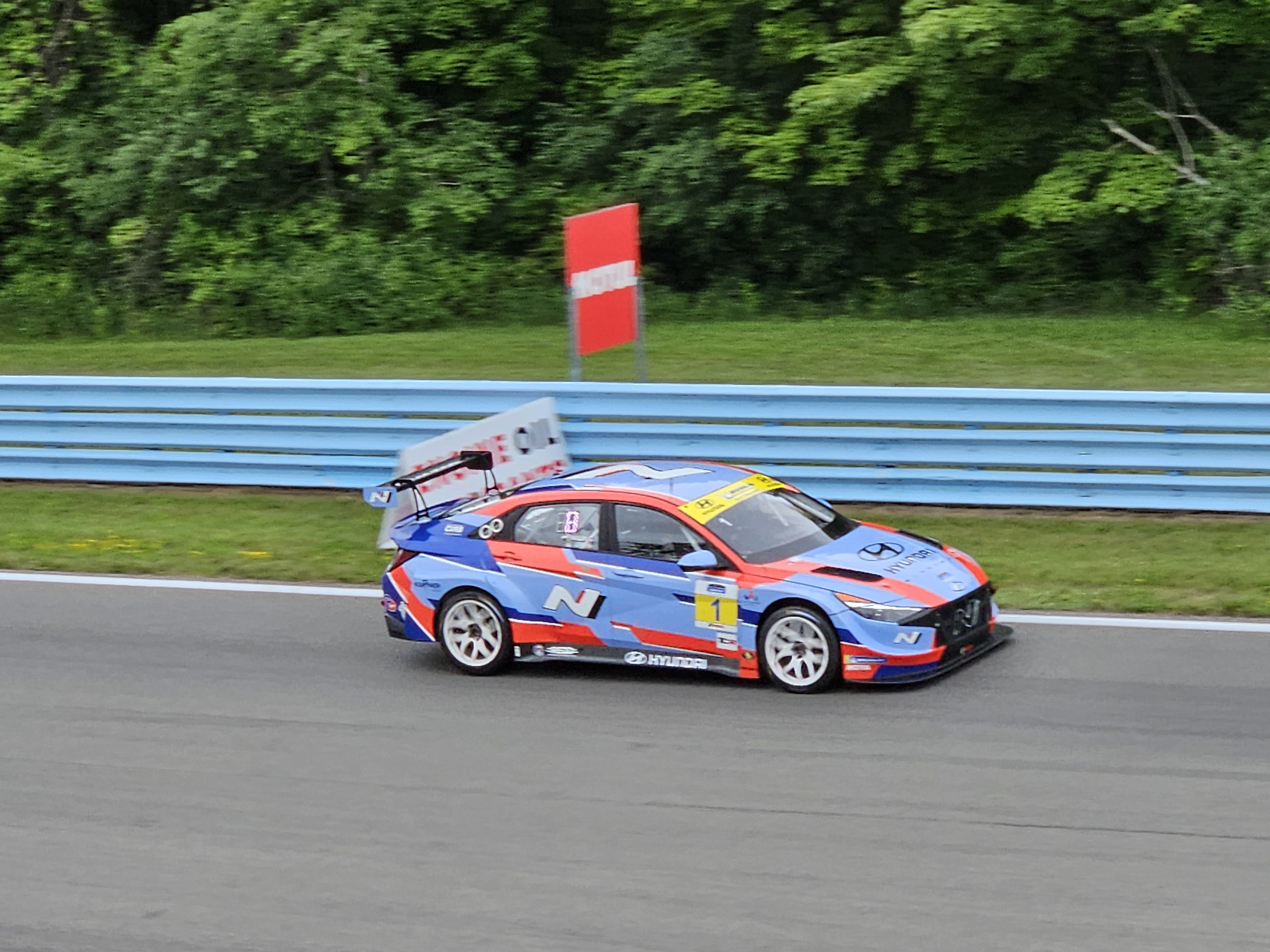
- Nationality: (United States) American
- Born: 24 December 1990 (age 35) Laguna Beach, California, U.S.
- Debut season: 2015
- Current team: EFFORT Racing
- Categorisation: FIA Silver (until 2018); FIA Gold (2019–)
- Starts: 25
- Championships: 0
- Wins: 3
- Poles: 1

Michael James Lewis (born December 24, 1990) is an American race car driver born in Laguna Beach, California. He is the son Steve Lewis, who is the owner of the famed Nine Racing Midget Team & former owner of Performance Racing Industry and Loretta Lewis. He has previously competed in Formula 3, Formula BMW, Ford Focus Midgets, Touring Cars, Late Model Stock Cars, Quarter Midgets, & Go-Karts. Lewis also officially tested a Formula One car for Scuderia Ferrari F1 in the F60 chassis on November 15, 2011 (as a result from his accomplishments in Formula 3 Italia).

== Career Summary ==
2013: FIA European Formula 3 Championship – 8 Top 10 Finishes **while missing 2 complete championship race weekends, Monza & Brands Hatch** / P12 at Masters of Formula 3 Zandvoort Circuit Park / Supported by Mercedes-Benz HWA AG Junior Program in F3 / Invited to and completed the 2013 Porsche Young Driver Academy – 2 Day Porsche Motorsport GT3 test at Barber Motorsports Park **1 of only 4 drivers invited**

2012: Formula 3 Euro Series – 1 Victory, 7 Total Podiums, 6 Top 5 Qualifying starts, 14 Top Ten Finishes (not including Podiums), 2 Top Five Finishes (not including Podiums) – P8 in overall championship / FIA Institute Young Driver Excellence Academy Participant (2nd American ever to be selected for the academy) / Supported by Mercedes-Benz HWA AG Junior Program in F3

2011: Formula 3 Italia Championship – 1st Rookie & 2nd classified overall (3 Victories, 2 Pole Positions, 2 Fastest Laps, & 6 Total Podiums), Top 3 in Qualifying for nearly all races / Officially tested the Scuderia Ferrari Formula One F60 Chassis on 15.11.11 / Participated in 3 NASCAR Latemodel Stock Car Races in USA

2010: Formula BMW Europe Championship / Formula BMW Asia Championship – 6 Races (4 Podiums, Three 2nd classified & One 3rd classified) / Official FBMW Junior (which included factory BMW support) for the entire 2010 Season / Participated in 4 USAC Ford Focus Midget Races in USA (Numerous Main Event Wins, Heat Race Wins, & Pole Positions) / Participated in 2 NASCAR Latemodel Stock Car Races in USA

2009: Formula BMW Americas Championship – 1st Rookie & 4th classified (3 Podiums, One 2nd classified & Two 3rd classified) / Formula BMW Asia Championship – Two Races (1 Podium, 2nd classified) / Awarded FBMW Junior Status for the following season / Participated in 11 USAC Ford Focus Midget Races in USA (Numerous Main Event Wins, Heat Race Wins, & Pole Positions) / Participated in 12-Hour Endurance Touring Car Race in USA – BMW in GT4 class (Finished 2nd in class, P4 overall)

2005 – 2008: Domestic and International Kart Racing – Numerous Podiums & Top 5 Finishes in International Karting Events (Participated Internationally in Italian Open Masters, French Open, WSK Events, Rotax Events, & ROK Events) / In USA – 2008 IKF TAG Pro $2,000-to-win event at Cal Speed – 1st classified / In USA – 2008 IKF Region 7 TAG Championship – 1st classified in overall Championship (In USA – Many additional Karting Wins, Pole Positions, & Fastest laps throughout ’05 – ’08 seasons) / In 2008, Participated in 2 USAC Ford Focus Midget Races in USA

2003 – 2005: Pomona Valley 1/4 Midget Association Senior Honda Championship – 1st classified / Pomona Valley 1/4 Midget Association Light 160 Honda Championship – 1st classified (Many additional Quarter Midget Wins, Pole Positions, & Fastest laps throughout ’03 – ’05 seasons)
