= J. J. Yeley =

American racing driver (born 1976)

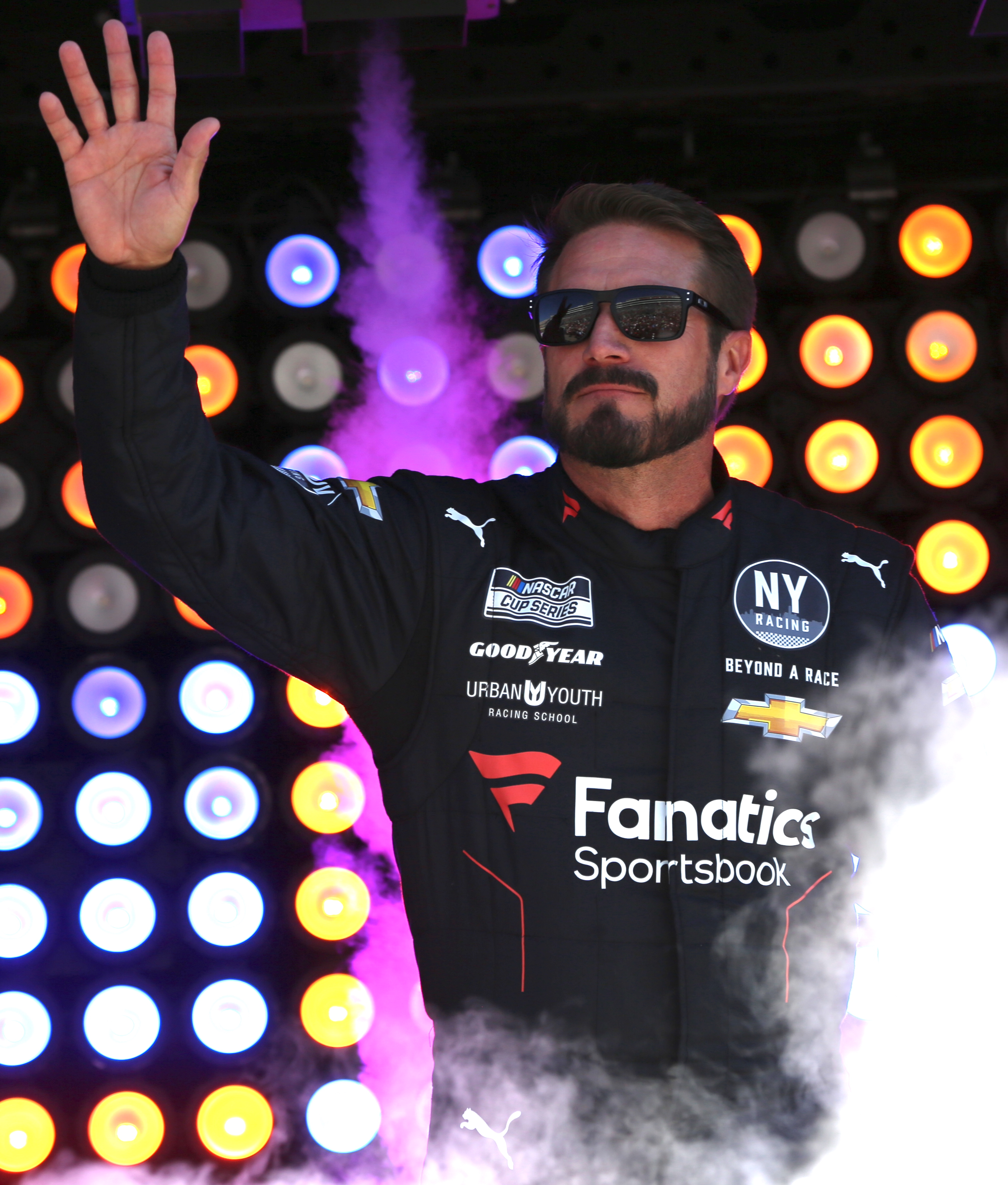
- Yeley at Las Vegas Motor Speedway in 2025
- Born: Christopher Beltram Hernandez Yeley; October 5, 1976 (age 50); Phoenix, Arizona, U.S.
- Achievements: 2003 USAC Triple Crown Champion; 2002, 2003 USAC Silver Crown Series Champion; 2001, 2003 USAC National Sprint Car Championship Champion; 2003 USAC National Midget Championship Champion; 2003 Hoosier Hundred Winner; 2001, 2008 4-Crown Nationals Midget Winner; 2000, 2001 4-Crown Nationals Silver Crown Winner; 2004, 2005 Copper World Classic Midget Winner
- Awards: 1997 USAC National Sprint Car Championship Rookie of the Year; 2002, 2003 National Sprint Car Hall of Fame Non-Winged Driver of the Year

NASCAR Cup Series career
- 400 races run over 20 years
- 2026 position: 45th
- Best finish: 21st (2007)
- First race: 2004 Pop Secret 500 (California)
- Last race: 2026 Season Finale 400 (Homestead)
Wins	Top tens	Poles
0	9	1

NASCAR O'Reilly Auto Parts Series career
- 405 races run over 21 years
- 2026 position: 37th
- Best finish: 5th (2006)
- First race: 2004 Sam's Town 300 (Las Vegas)
- Last race: 2026 O'Reilly Auto Parts 300 (Homestead)
Wins	Top tens	Poles
0	48	3

NASCAR FedEx Freight Truck Series career
- 37 races run over 12 years
- 2025 position: 94th
- Best finish: 42nd (2009)
- First race: 2004 Line-X 200 (Michigan)
- Last race: 2025 Love's RV Stop 225 (Talladega)
Wins	Top tens	Poles
0	2	0

ARCA Menards Series career
- 1 race run over 1 year
- Best finish: 103rd (2005)
- First race: 2005 Advance Discount Auto Parts 200 (Daytona)
Wins	Top tens	Poles
0	1	0

IndyCar Series career
- 8 races run over 2 years
- Best finish: 28th (2000)
- First race: 1998 Dura Lube 200 (Phoenix)
- Last race: 2000 Excite 500 (Texas)
Wins	Podiums	Poles
0	0	0
- Statistics up to date as of November 8, 2026.

Christopher Beltram Hernandez "J. J." Yeley (born October 5, 1976) is an American professional stock car racing driver. He last competed part-time in the NASCAR Cup Series, driving the No. 44 Chevrolet Camaro ZL1 for NY Racing Team, and part-time in the NASCAR O'Reilly Auto Parts Series, driving the No. 42 Chevrolet Camaro SS for Young's Motorsports, the No. 5 Ford Mustang Dark Horse for Hettinger Racing, and the No. 38 Ford Mustang Dark Horse for RSS Racing. He has previously competed in the NASCAR Craftsman Truck Series, what is now the ARCA Menards Series, the NASCAR Whelen Modified Tour, as well as the IndyCar Series.

Yeley is one of only seven drivers ever to win the USAC Triple Crown which includes the likes of Pancho Carter, Tony Stewart, Dave Darland, Jerry Coons Jr., Tracy Hines, and Logan Seavey. He is nicknamed "J. J." (Jimmy Jack) after his father and a close family friend.

Yeley holds the record for the most starts across all three of the top divisions of NASCAR without winning a race.

== Racing career ==
=== Open-wheel racing ===
Yeley won the 1997 edition of Indiana Sprintweek and captured the Rookie of the Year Award in the USAC National Sprint Car Series despite starting relatively few races. In 1998, Yeley competed in four Indy Racing League (IRL) races, including the Indianapolis 500. His one top-ten finish in these four races was at Indianapolis, where he finished ninth despite a spin on the first turn of the first lap, which nearly collected eventual race winner Eddie Cheever Jr.

Yeley also raced in the IRL in 2000 in an underfunded effort with McCormack Motorsports, but ultimately returned to USAC racing, picking up where he had left off by winning 2001 and 2003 National Sprint, 2002 and 2003 Silver Crown, and 2003 National Midget Series titles.

Yeley's championships in all three of USAC's top divisions in 2003 made him only the second driver, after Tony Stewart in 1995, to achieve the "Triple Crown" in a single season. Stewart was the owner of the Sprint and Silver Crown cars in Yeley's 2003 season; the Midget, which Yeley drove in 2003, Steve Lewis' No. 9, had been driven by Stewart in 1995. Yeley scored 24 USAC wins in his 2003 season, breaking the previous record of nineteen set by A. J. Foyt in 1961 and later tied by Sleepy Tripp (1988) and Jay Drake (2000).

=== NASCAR ===
==== 2004–2007: Joe Gibbs Racing ====
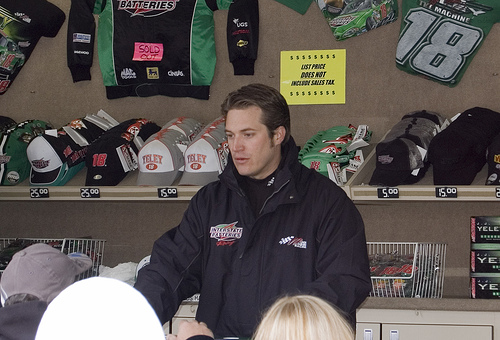
Yeley talking to fans at his merchandise hauler in 2006

As had Stewart, Yeley signed with Joe Gibbs Racing, starting seventeen of 34 races in the 2004 NASCAR Busch Series and achieving four top-ten finishes. He also competed in two Nextel Cup Series races in the No. 11 car and the IROC series. Yeley drove the full season in 2005 in the NASCAR Busch Series for Gibbs' No. 18 car, posting twelve top-ten finishes and ending the season eleventh in points. After the departure of Jason Leffler, who drove the No. 11 car in the Nextel Cup series, Yeley, Busch Series teammate Denny Hamlin, and Terry Labonte split the remaining races. Yeley drove four races, and Labonte and Hamlin drove the final seven. Hamlin was named to drive the No. 11 FedEx car for the 2006 season. Bobby Labonte made his announcement in November that he was leaving Joe Gibbs Racing. On November 12, at Phoenix International Raceway, Yeley was announced as the new driver for the No. 18 Interstate Batteries Chevrolet.

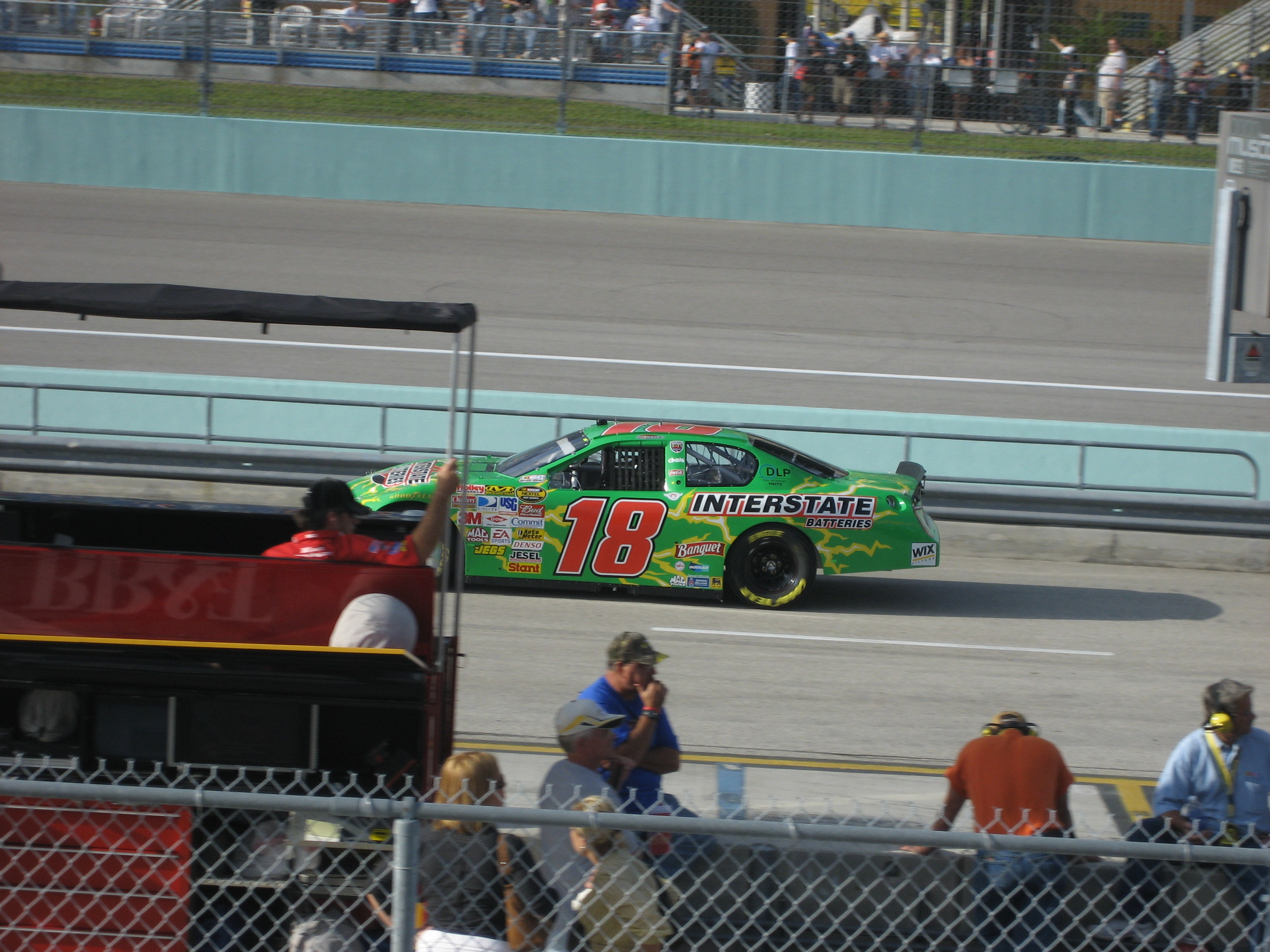
Yeley in the No. 18 for Joe Gibbs Racing in 2007

Yeley ran full seasons with Joe Gibbs Racing in both the Nextel Cup and Busch Series in 2006. He drove the No. 18 Chevy in the Nextel Cup Series, and the No. 18 Vigoro/Home Depot Chevrolet in the Busch Series. Yeley's best Nextel Cup finishes of 2006 came at California Speedway and Loudon, where he finished eighth; his best Busch Series finish came on June 17 at Kentucky Speedway. Yeley finished his 2006 season fifth in the Busch Series points standings with three poles, nine top-fives, and 22 top-tens. In the 2006 Bank of America 500, Yeley was running at the top of the track when he decided to cut down the track to try to go to pit road. He ran right into Chase contender Mark Martin and turned Mark head-on into the wall in a devastating crash. Martin's crew chief, Pat Tryson, had to be restrained by NASCAR officials as he showed his displeasure to Yeley, who also wrecked. The crash ended Mark Martin's championship hopes, as he was second in points before the incident. Despite racing for one of the best teams in the sport, Yeley would finish a dismal 29th in the points standings.

Yeley's 2007 season was filled with rumors about being released from Joe Gibbs Racing. At the 2007 Coca-Cola 600, Yeley scored a career-high second-place finish on a fuel gamble, with Casey Mears scoring the victory. Exactly three weeks later, at Michigan, Yeley took his first career pole at the Nextel Cup level, beating Jimmie Johnson by one-thousandth of a second (.001). During the middle of the 2007 season, Joe Gibbs announced that his team would be switching to Toyota in 2008. Gibbs also announced that Yeley would not return for 2008. Gibbs ended up signing Kyle Busch to drive the No. 18.

==== 2008–2012 ====
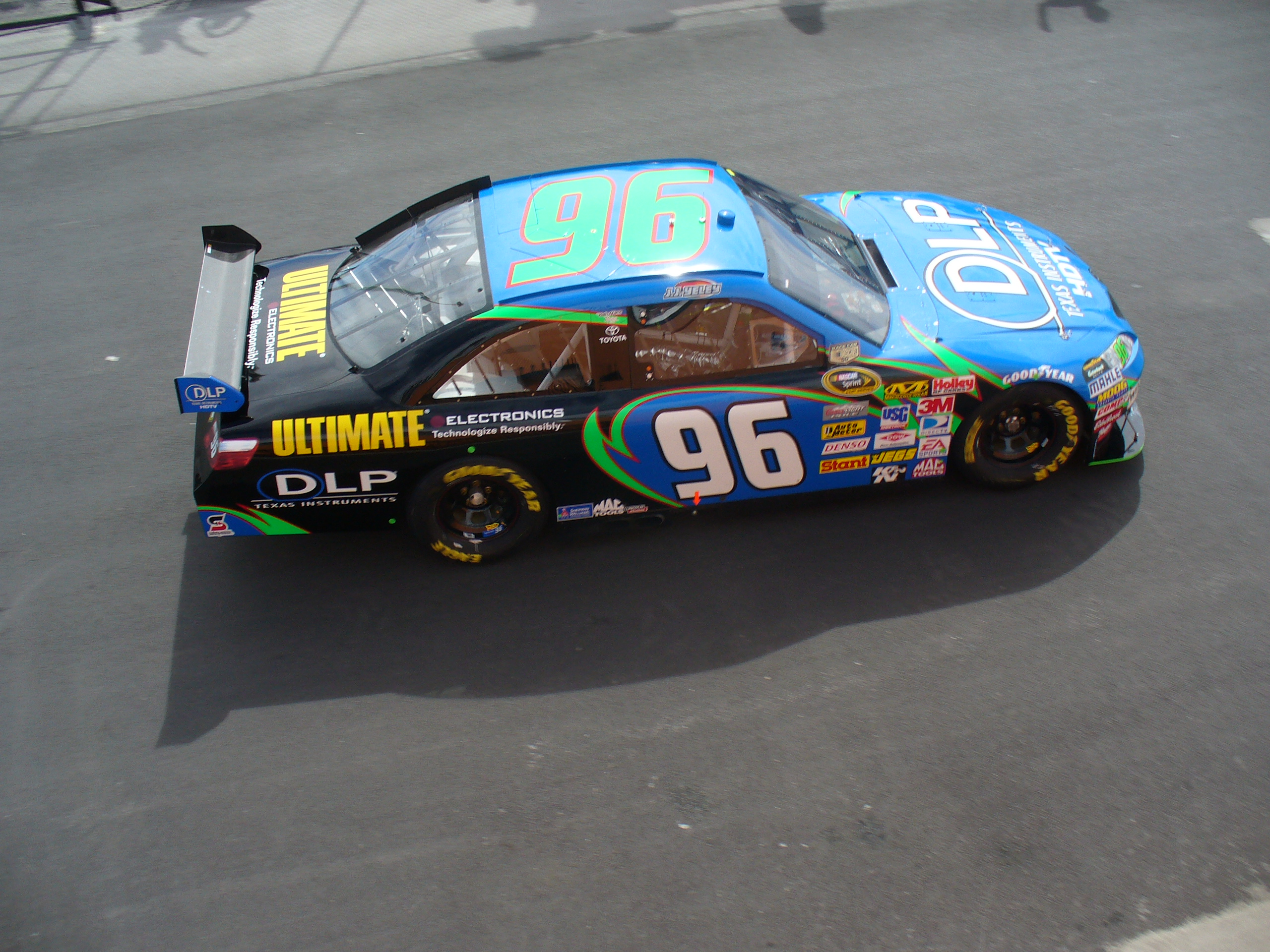
Yeley in the No. 96 for Hall of Fame Racing in 2008

Yeley moved to Hall of Fame Racing, an affiliate of JGR, replacing Tony Raines in the No. 96 DLP Toyota. His struggles continued, as the team fell from being in the top-35 every week with Raines behind the wheel to struggling to make races weekly (the team's first DNQ came with Yeley behind the wheel).

On July 5, Yeley performed an in-race switch into the No. 20 car for an ill Tony Stewart. He ran strongly for most of the race but was collected in two crashes within the last five laps and ended with a twentieth-place finish. On August 6, 2008, Yeley was released from his contract to drive for Hall of Fame Racing, first by being replaced by P. J. Jones at Watkins Glen, Nationwide Series driver and Hall of Fame Racing test driver Brad Coleman at Michigan, and Ken Schrader for the remaining races. Yeley later stated that although there was an alliance with JGR, they were never truly involved in Hall-of-Fame's operations, and he was disappointed in not being allowed to improve the situation with the team. Yeley spent the rest of the season out of a ride. In 2009, he moved to the Camping World Truck Series, driving the No. 73 Chevrolet Silverado for Tagsby Racing. He was also named to take over the Mayfield Motorsports No. 41 Sprint Cup Series entry effective immediately following the indefinite suspension of owner/driver Jeremy Mayfield due to a substance abuse violation on May 9, 2009.

Later in 2009, Yeley broke three cervical vertebrae during a crash in a USAC race. Yeley drove at Daytona in 2010 for Daisy Ramirez Motorsports in the Camping World Truck Series. This was the team's debut, and he finished a career-best tenth after starting 36th. Yeley was announced as the driver for the Whitney Motorsports No. 46 Sprint Cup Series car on May 4, 2010. On May 7, he qualified the No. 46 into the Showtime Southern 500 at Darlington. Yeley qualified for nine of the fourteen races he attempted. At the Coke Zero 400, he finished a team-best nineteenth. Yeley also raced for Latitude 43 Motorsports in Phoenix and Tommy Baldwin Racing, plus drove for Richard Petty Motorsports in a relief role at Charlotte, replacing a sick Kasey Kahne.

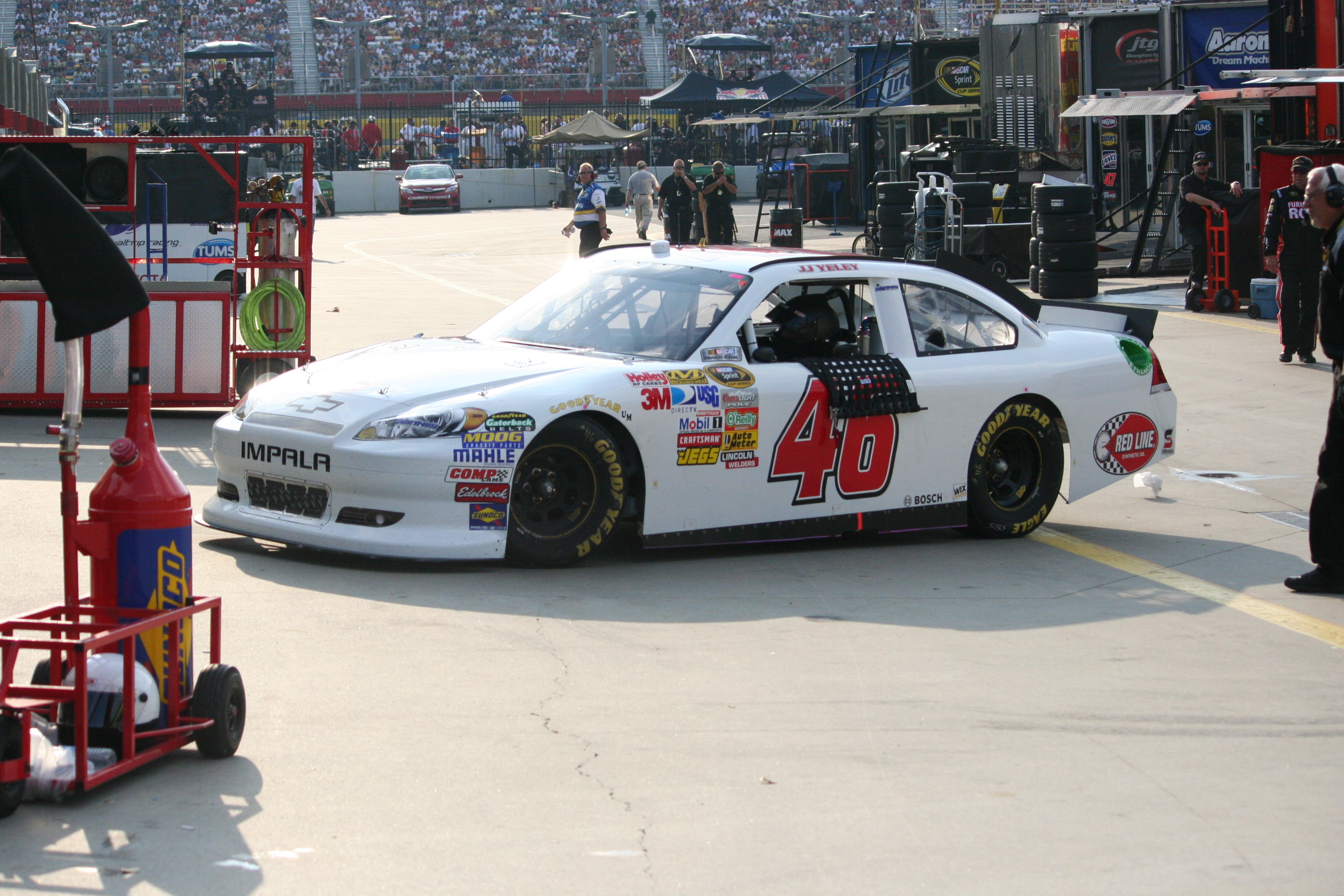
Yeley in the No. 46 for Whitney Motorsports at Charlotte in May 2011

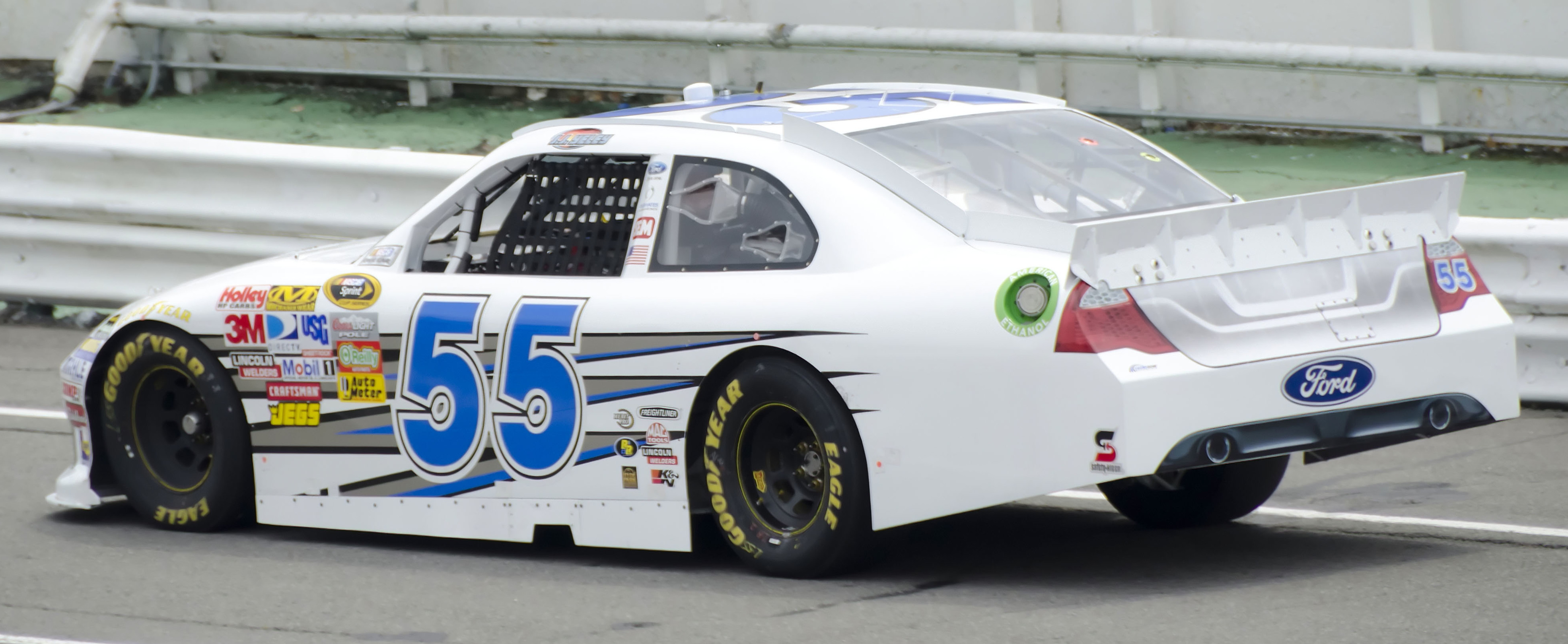
Yeley in the No. 55 for Front Row Motorsports at Pocono in August 2011

Yeley raced his way into the 2011 Daytona 500 in the Gatorade Duels for Whitney Motorsports, a team that failed to qualify for the 2010 event. He finished 43rd in the event after a blown engine eleven laps into the race. At Loudon, Yeley drove the No. 38 Front Row Motorsports entry in place of Travis Kvapil, who was unable to make the race due to his Truck Series commitments. He ran the remainder of the season in a fourth Front Row entry, the No. 55, with occasional races in the No. 38.

For 2012, Yeley signed with Robinson-Blakeney Racing to drive the No. 49 Toyota in the Sprint Cup Series. He also drove the team's No. 28 Nationwide Series car in that series' season-opening race at Daytona. Halfway through the season, Yeley moved to Max Q Motorsports to drive the No. 37 in a partnership with Tommy Baldwin Racing. Both the No. 49 and the No. 37 were mostly start and park efforts.

==== 2013–2019 ====
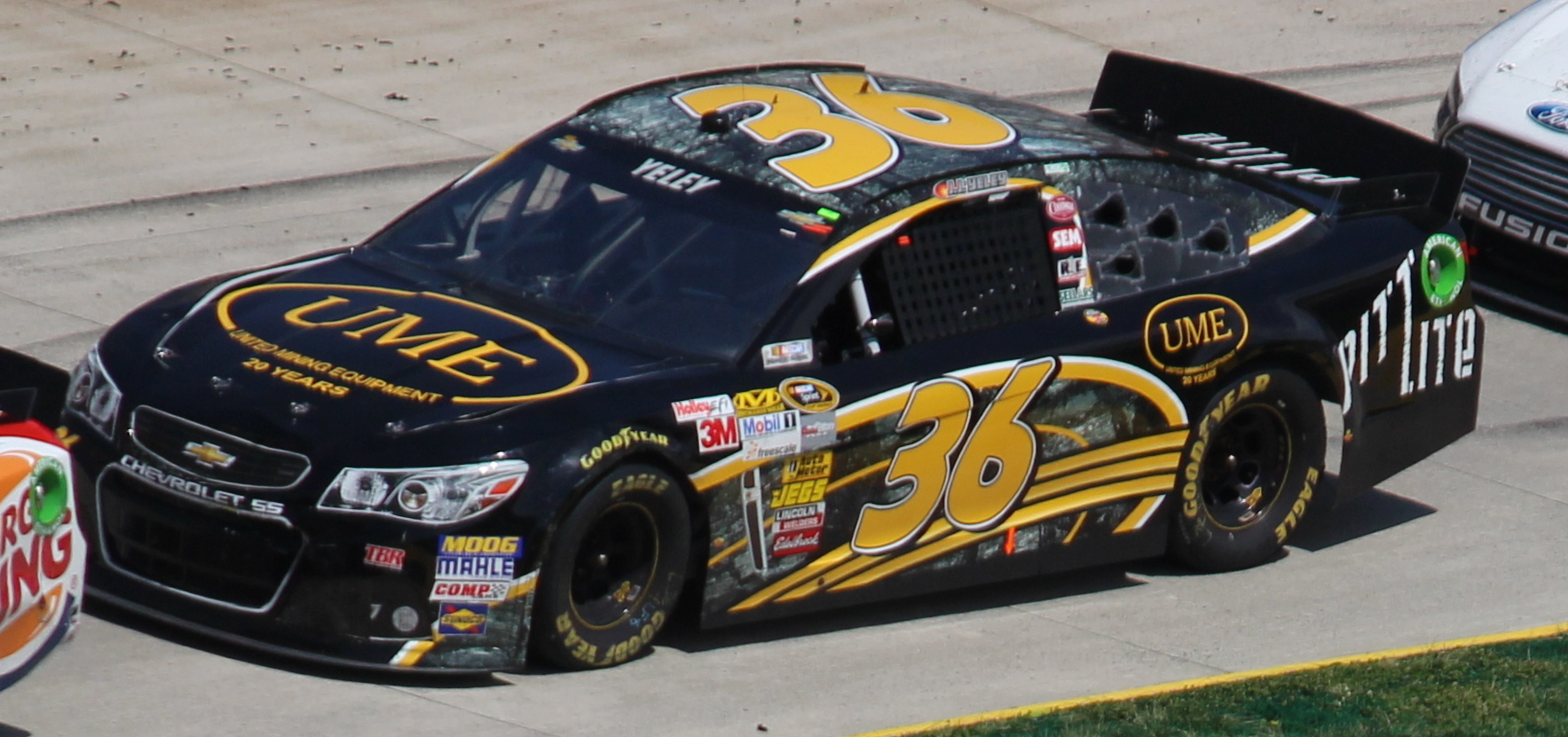
Yeley in the No. 36 for Tommy Baldwin Racing in 2013

In 2013, Yeley moved to Tommy Baldwin Racing to drive the No. 36 Chevrolet, with sponsorship from Golden Corral at races on superspeedways. United Mining, Accell Construction, and several other companies also served as primary sponsor throughout the season. Yeley finished tenth in his TBR debut in the Daytona 500, his first top-ten since 2008. Yeley ran his first full season (in a non-start and park ride) for the first time since 2008, and finished 32nd in points. He was replaced by Reed Sorenson in 2014.

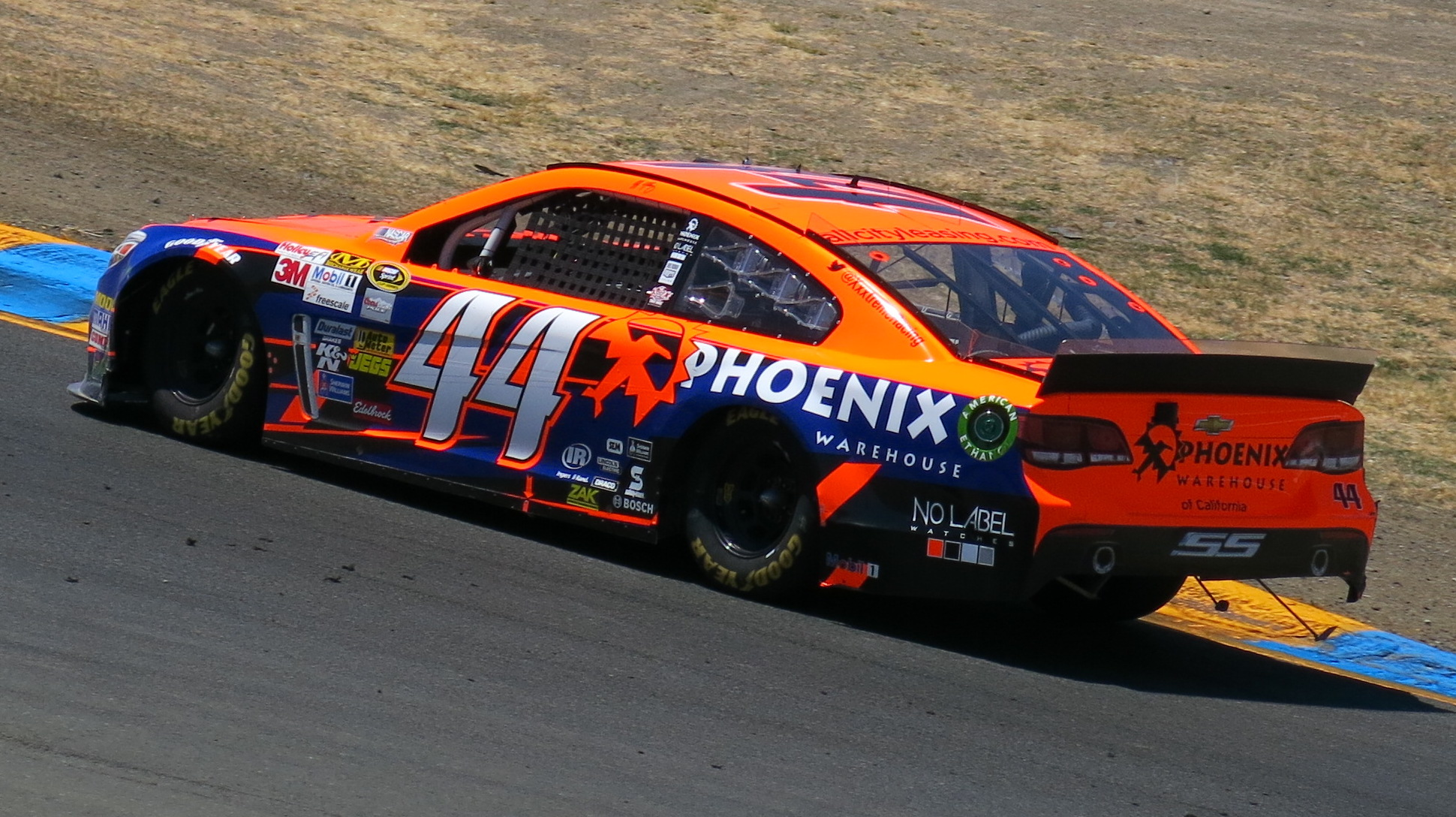
Yeley's No. 44 for Xxxtreme Motorsport in the Cup Series in 2014

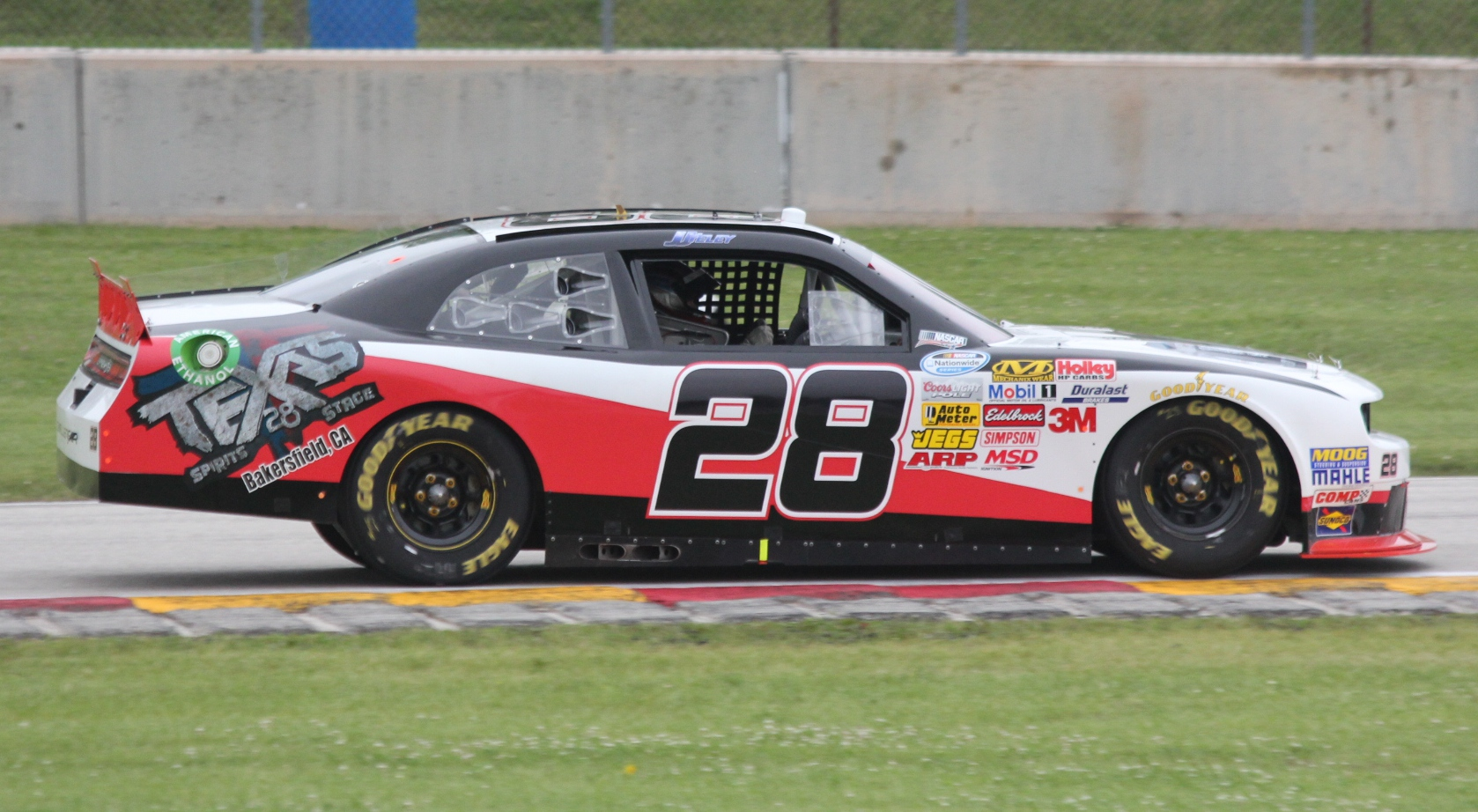
Yeley's No. 28 for JGL Racing in the Xfinity Series in 2014

On February 13, it was announced that Yeley would drive the No. 44 with Xxxtreme Motorsport starting at Phoenix. In late-April, the team purchased the No. 30 team from Swan Racing, with Yeley shifting to drive the new car number. Yeley replaced Ryan Truex in the No. 83 BK Racing Toyota at the Pure Michigan 400 after Truex suffered a concussion during a practice session. He later drove the team's start and park No. 93 at Richmond, and ran the last seven races in the 83 following Truex's dismissal from the team.

In 2015, Yeley moved to BK Racing full-time, replacing Alex Bowman in the No. 23 Toyota. He also ran full-time in the Xfinity Series for No. 28 Toyota for JGL Racing, whom he had joined partway through the 2014 season. Before Darlington, Yeley and BK Racing teammate Jeb Burton switched rides with Burton moving to the No. 23, while Yeley moved to the No. 26.

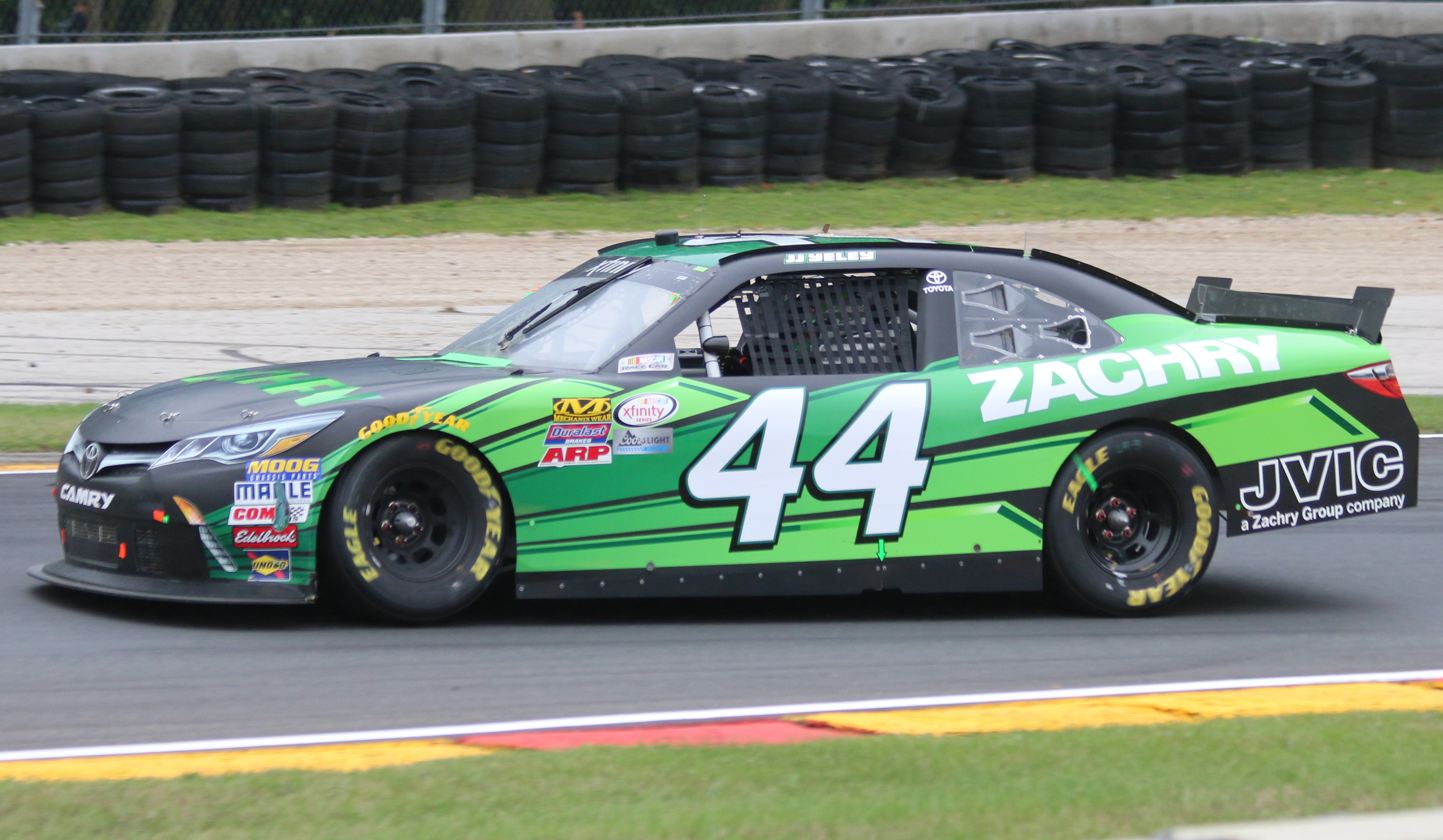
Yeley in the No. 44 for TriStar Motorsports in 2016

In 2016, Yeley had no rides for the Daytona weekend. However, on February 24, 2016, it was announced that Yeley would drive the No. 14 Toyota Camry for TriStar Motorsports in the Xfinity Series, starting in Atlanta. Yeley replaced David Starr in the No. 44 at Richmond due to Starr being sidelined with an illness; Yeley eventually took over the ride full-time.

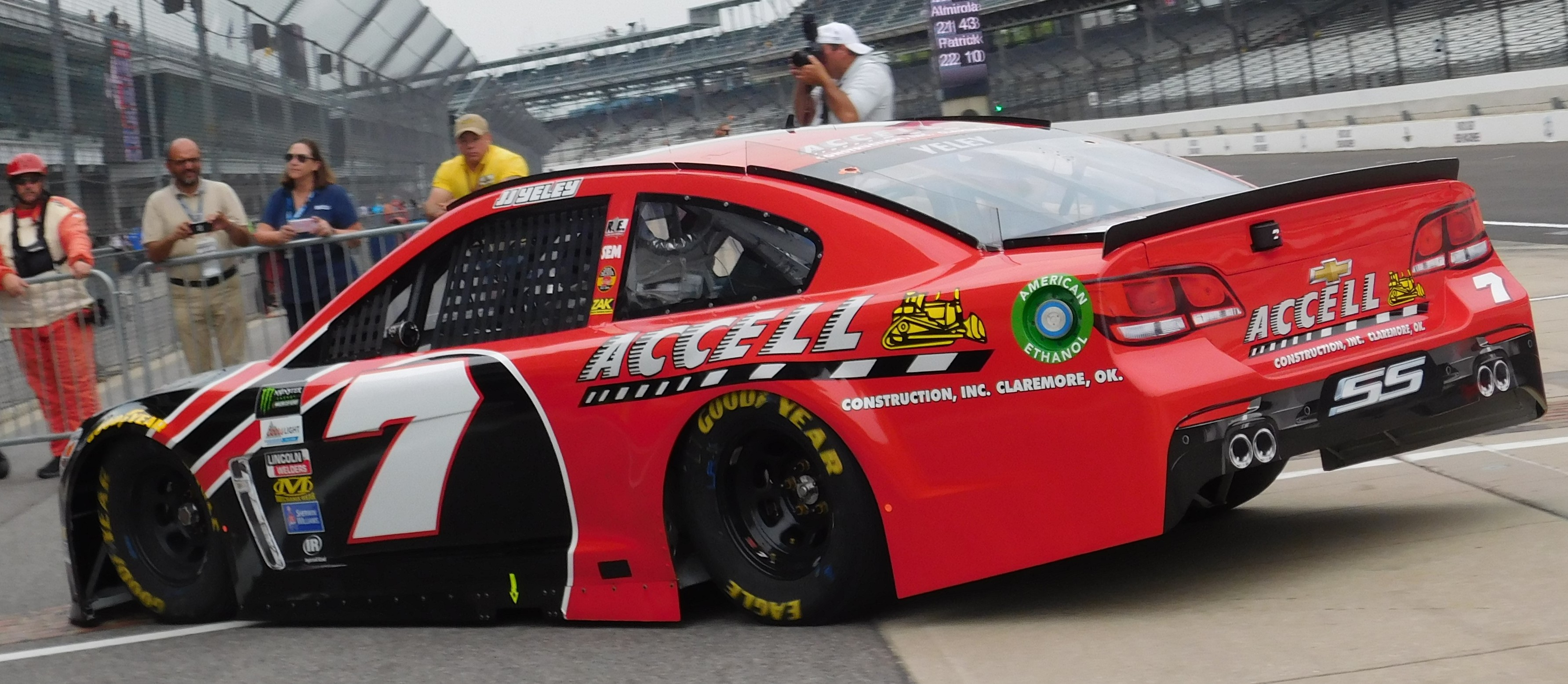
Yeley's No. 7 for Tommy Baldwin Racing in the Cup Series in 2017

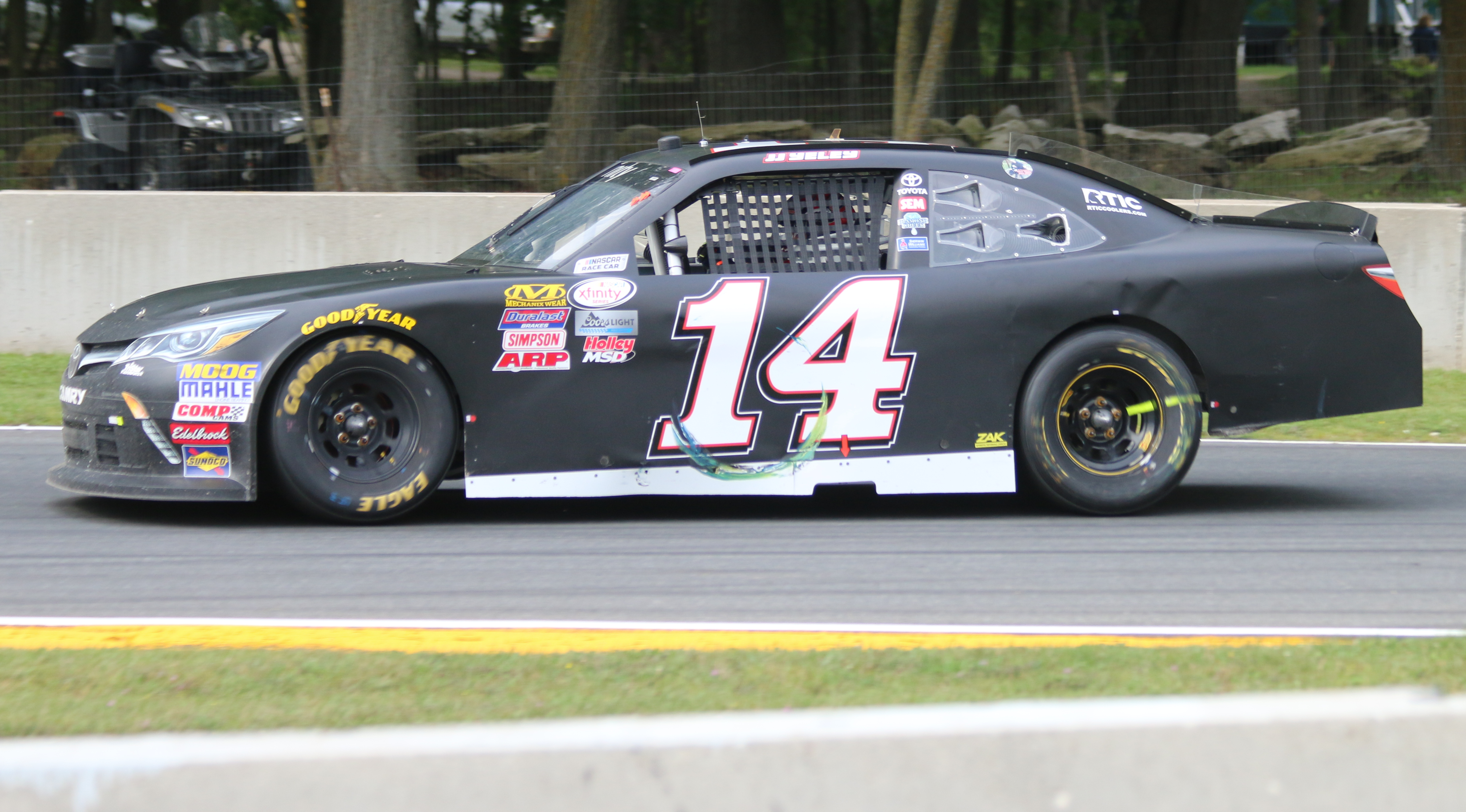
Yeley's No. 14 for TriStar Motorsports in the Xfinity Series in 2017

For the 2017 O'Reilly Auto Parts 500 at Texas, Yeley made his return to the Cup Series, driving the No. 7 Chevrolet SS for Tommy Baldwin Racing, a team he last drove for in 2013. After starting 27th, he finished in the same position, four laps down.

In 2017, Yeley returned to the No. 14 of TriStar for the full season and a part-time schedule in the No. 7 for Tommy Baldwin Racing. On July 22, TriStar owner Mark Smith died, and the next week, Yeley finished a season-best sixth at Iowa Speedway.

In March 2018, Yeley drove the No. 55 car for Premium Motorsports in the STP 500 in the Cup Series, where he finished 31st. Two months later, Yeley joined NY Racing Team (formerly Xxxtreme Motorsport) for the Coca-Cola 600, driving the No. 7. In the 600, Yeley qualified 40th and finished 38th after retiring from the event on lap 191 with a fuel pump issue.

In the summer of 2018, Yeley made his return to the No. 23 car, which was previously owned by his former team, BK Racing. NY Racing, for several races, fielded the No. 23 in coordination with BK, sharing the No. 23 charter and the Steakhouse Elite sponsorship. After BK's bankruptcy auction, Front Row Motorsports was awarded BK's assets, and NY Racing continued their collaboration with Front Row to the season's end before both teams parted ways.

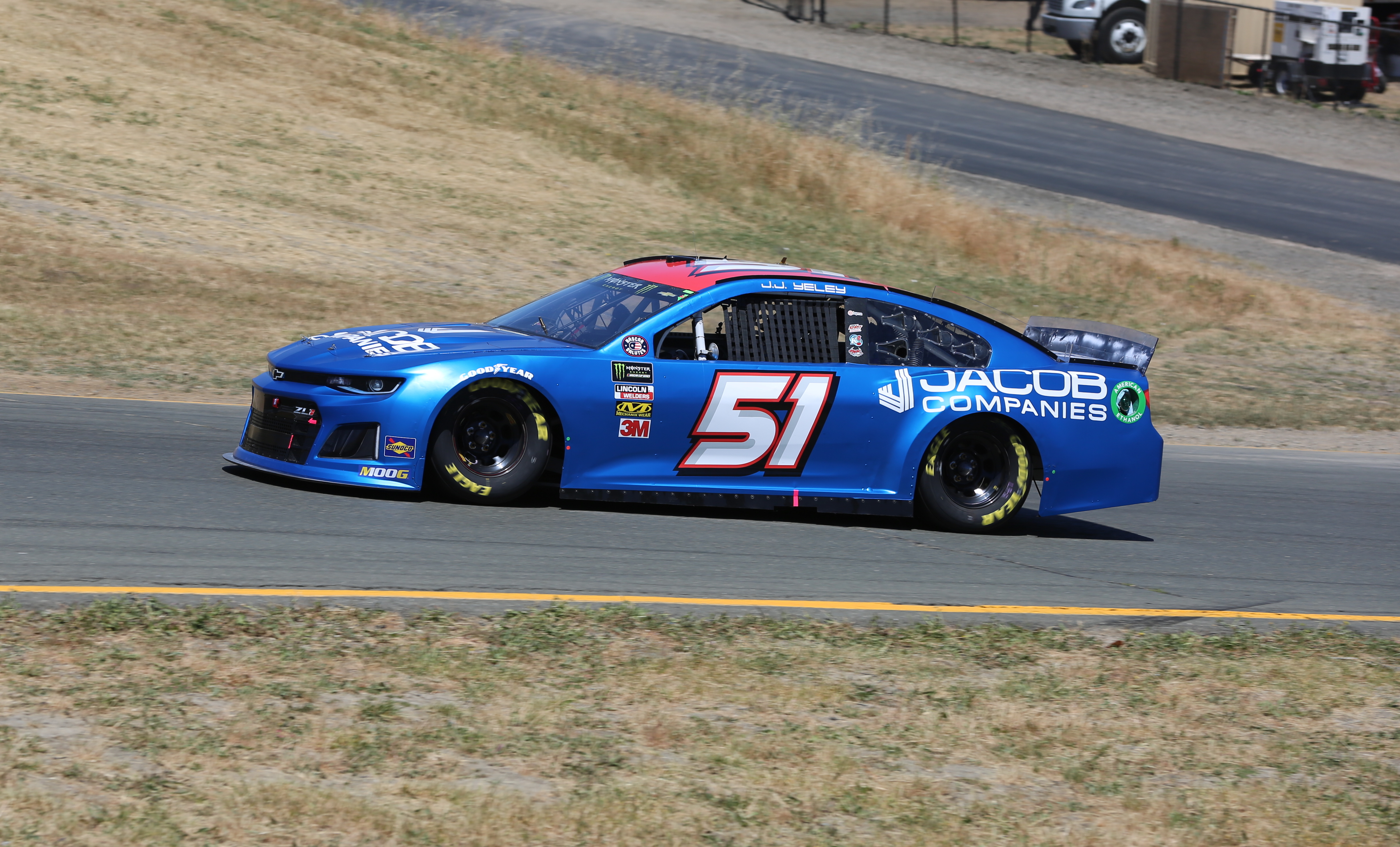
Yeley's No. 51 for Rick Ware Racing in the Cup Series in 2019

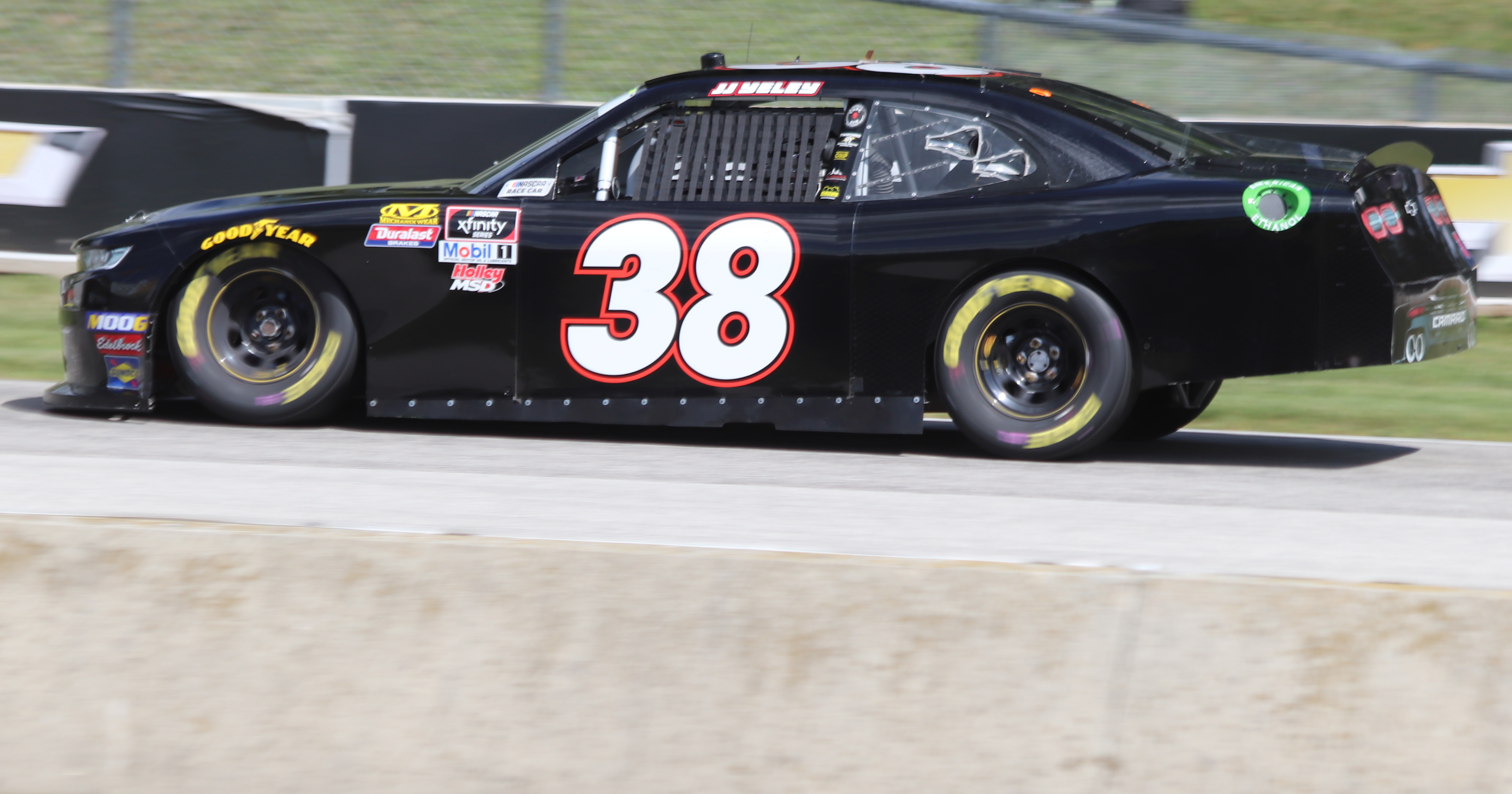
Yeley's No. 38 for RSS Racing in the Xfinity Series in 2019

For 2019, NY Racing planned to field the No. 7 Steakhouse Elite-sponsored Ford Mustang with Yeley as the driver for an undetermined number of races. Before the team formally entered any races, Yeley and Steakhouse Elite partnered with Rick Ware Racing for the Pocono 400 in June. In August, he debuted Ware's No. 54 car at Bristol. On November 14, RWR announced Yeley would race full-time for the team in the 2020 NASCAR Cup Series season.

==== 2020–present ====
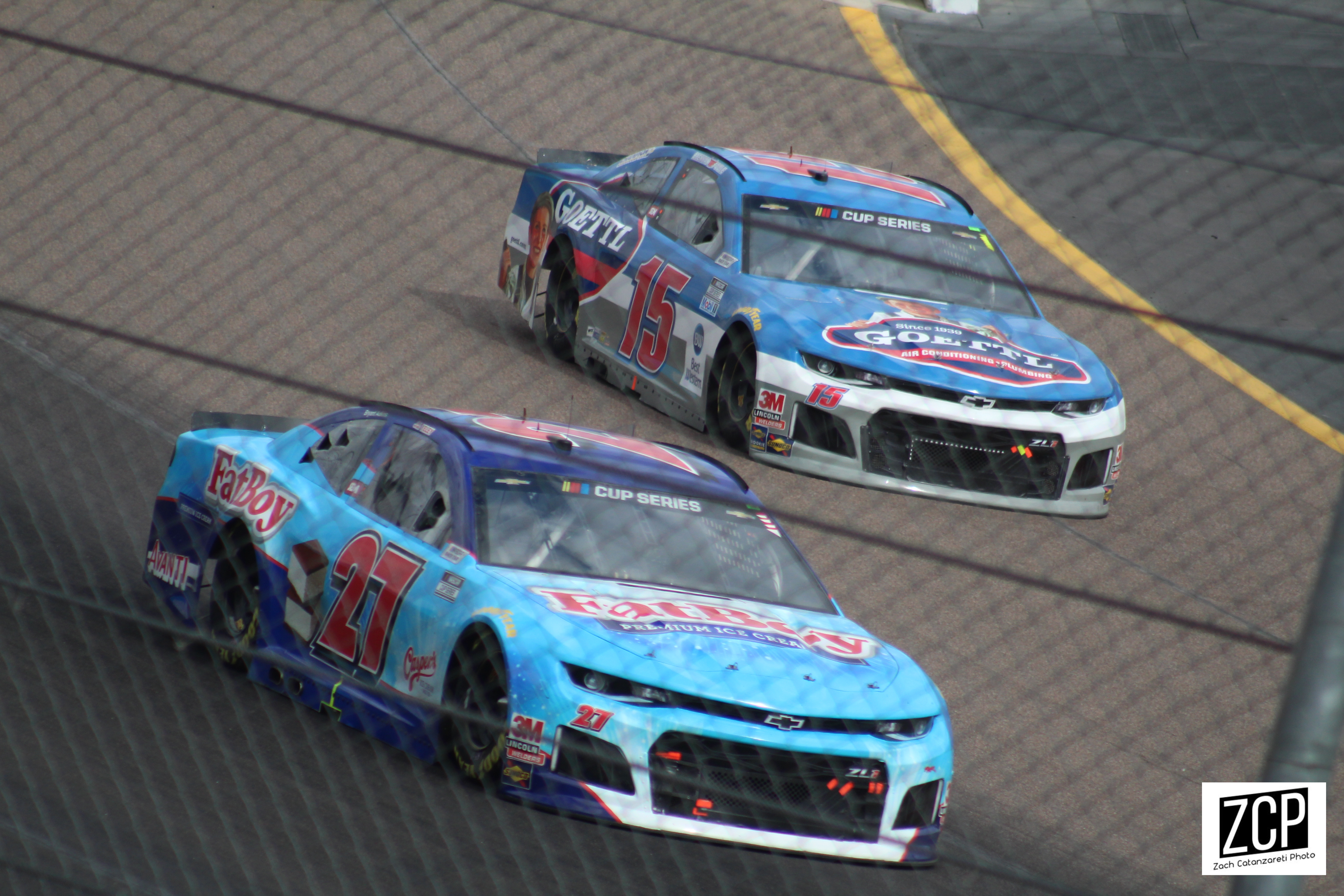
Yeley (No. 27) racing his Rick Ware Racing teammate Brennan Poole (No. 15) in 2020

Yeley failed to qualify for the 2020 Daytona 500 after finishing 21st in Duel 2 of the 2020 Bluegreen Vacations Duels. In August, he switched to Truck points in order to run the Dover Triple Truck Challenge race with Reaume Brothers Racing.

Just as was the case in 2016 and 2019, Yeley was without a ride in any of the three series for the season-opening races at Daytona in 2021. His first start of the season did not come until two weeks later at Homestead, where he returned to Rick Ware Racing in their No. 17 Xfinity Series car, now fielded in a partnership with SS-Green Light Racing, the same partnership the SSGLR No. 07 had in 2020 when he and other RWR drivers drove it. On March 4, 2021, it was announced that Yeley would be driving the No. 66 Cup Series car for MBM Motorsports in select races throughout the season with new sponsorship from Diamondback Land Surveying, which he brought to the team. However, Yeley confirmed in a tweet the following day that (despite helping the team land that sponsor), he would not be driving the car or for the team in any races. Despite this announcement, he would drive at the 2021 South Point 400 in the No. 66 with sponsorship from FatBoy Ice Cream.

In 2022, Yeley attempted to race the 2022 Daytona 500 driving the No. 55 for MBM Motorsports with sponsorship from HEX.com but failed to qualify. Instead, he would attempt the entire 2022 Xfinity Series season driving the No. 66 full-time for MBM. He managed to qualify the No. 55 for MBM at Talladega. He had also made numerous starts for the No. 15 for Rick Ware Racing. He achieved his first top-ten finish for MBM, finishing eighth at Portland. He ran the No. 13 at Nashville and DNQed the No. 66 at Road America and IRC. At Michigan, Yeley triggered a massive pileup on lap 25 that took Austin Cindric and Kyle Busch out of contention. Yeley drove the Rick Ware Racing No. 51 at the Charlotte Roval race as a substitute for Cody Ware, who broke his ankle in a crash at Texas. On April 23, 2023, filling in for the suspended Ware, Yeley finished eleventh at Talladega Superspeedway, his best finish since the 2013 Daytona 500. Later in the season at Atlanta, Yeley finished seventh in the rain-shortened Quaker State 400, recording his first top-ten finish since the aforementioned 2013 Daytona 500.

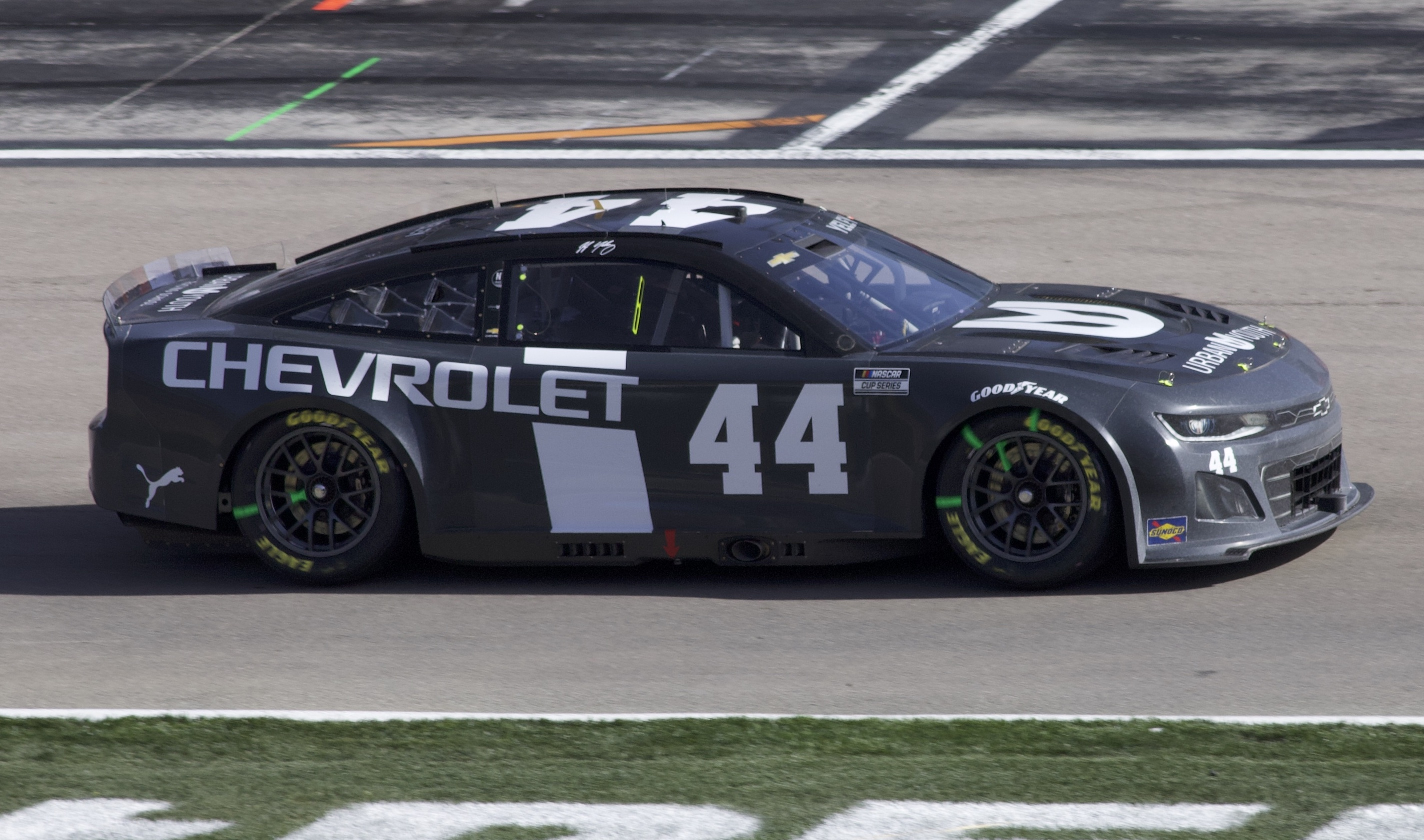
Yeley's No. 44 car at Las Vegas Motor Speedway in 2024

In January 2024, Yeley announced that he would not be returning to RWR for 2024 and instead intended to find a full-time ride in the Xfinity Series, although nothing came to fruition. He did however receive a late call to attempt to qualify the No. 44 Chevrolet for NY Racing Team in the 2024 Daytona 500 after Greg Biffle, who was rumored to drive the car, announced he would not run the No. 44 due to "unfulfilled contract obligations" from 2022. Yeley ultimately failed to make the race after finishing sixteenth in Duel 1 of the 2024 Bluegreen Vacations Duels. Yeley would return to the team at Las Vegas, finishing 34th, and at Charlotte, finishing last in the 40 car field after having steering issues. At the Summer Atlanta race, Yeley would put up a solid race and finish on the lead lap with a season-best 23rd-place run.

In 2025, Yeley once again ran select Cup Series races for NY Racing Team, where he had a best finish of 30th at Las Vegas in October. He also ran in one race in the Xfinity Series at Charlotte, where he finished in 28th. It was also during this year that he returned the Truck Series at Talladega, where he drove the No. 7 Chevrolet for Spire Motorsports. He finished in 13th place.

In 2026, Yeley once again ran a partial Cup schedule for NY Racing Team, including several starts in the now-renamed O'Reilly Auto Parts Series for Young's Motorsports, Hettinger Racing, and RSS Racing.

== Motorsports career results ==
=== American open-wheel racing ===
(key)

==== IndyCar ====
IndyCar Series results
Year	Team	1	2	3	4	5	6	7	8	9	10	11	Rank	Points	Ref
1998	Sinden Racing Services	WDW	PHX; 25	INDY; 9	TXS; 19	NHM; 23	DOV	CLT	PPIR	ATL; 25	TX2	LVS	**32nd**	**50**	
2000	Byrd-McCormack Racing	WDW	PHX	LVS	INDY	TXS	PPI	ATL; 17	KTY; 15	TX2; 25			**28th**	**33**	

==== Indianapolis 500 ====
Year	Chassis	Engine	Start	Finish	Team
1998	Dallara	Oldsmobile	13	9	Sinden Racing Services

=== NASCAR ===
(key) (Bold – Pole position awarded by qualifying time. Italics – Pole position earned by points standings or practice time. * – Most laps led.)

==== Cup Series ====
NASCAR Cup Series results
Year	Team	No.	Make	1	2	3	4	5	6	7	8	9	10	11	12	13	14	15	16	17	18	19	20	21	22	23	24	25	26	27	28	29	30	31	32	33	34	35	36	NCSC	Pts	Ref
2004	Joe Gibbs Racing	11	Chevy	DAY	CAR	LVS	ATL	DAR	BRI	TEX	MAR	TAL	CAL	RCH	CLT	DOV	POC	MCH	SON	DAY	CHI	NHA	POC	IND	GLN	MCH; DNQ	BRI	CAL; 41	RCH	NHA	DOV	TAL	KAN	CLT	MAR	ATL; 27	PHO	DAR	HOM; DNQ	69th	122	
2005	Joe Gibbs Racing	20	Chevy	DAY	CAL	LVS	ATL	BRI	MAR	TEX	PHO	TAL	DAR	RCH	CLT	DOV	POC	MCH	SON	DAY	CHI; QL^{†}	NHA	POC	IND	GLN	MCH	BRI													56th	276	
2005	Joe Gibbs Racing	11	Chevy																									CAL; 39	RCH	NHA; 34	DOV; 25	TAL; 29	KAN	CLT	MAR					56th	276	
2005	Joe Gibbs Racing	80	Chevy																																	ATL; DNQ	TEX	PHO	HOM	56th	276	
2006	Joe Gibbs Racing	18	Chevy	DAY; 41	CAL; 8	LVS; 17	ATL; 15	BRI; 33	MAR; 20	TEX; 35	PHO; 28	TAL; 11	RCH; 22	DAR; 26	CLT; 20	DOV; 42	POC; 15	MCH; 40	SON; 33	DAY; 37	CHI; 10	NHA; 12	POC; 11	IND; 34	GLN; 33	MCH; 37	BRI; 31	CAL; 19	RCH; 13	NHA; 8	DOV; 30	KAN; 41	TAL; 32	CLT; 29	MAR; 31	ATL; 16	TEX; 20	PHO; 20	HOM; 30	29th	3220	
2007	Joe Gibbs Racing	18	Chevy	DAY; 12	CAL; 13	LVS; 18	ATL; 22	BRI; 36	MAR; 23	TEX; 43	PHO; 21	TAL; 19	RCH; 14	DAR; 18	CLT; 2	DOV; 37	POC; 17	**MCH**; 28	SON; 21	NHA; 22	DAY; 20	CHI; 35	IND; 36	POC; 35	GLN; 18	MCH; 25	BRI; 13	CAL; 29	RCH; 10	NHA; 10	DOV; 33	KAN; 14	TAL; 18	CLT; 13	MAR; 42	ATL; 35	TEX; 17	PHO; 14	HOM; 31	21st	3456	
2008	Hall of Fame Racing	96	Toyota	DAY; 25	CAL; 29	LVS; 27	ATL; 37	BRI; 25	MAR; 27	TEX; 42	PHO; 39	TAL; DNQ	RCH; 34	DAR; 26	CLT; 38	DOV; 24	POC; DNQ	MCH; 41	SON; DNQ	NHA; 3	DAY; DNQ	CHI; 24	IND; 28	POC; 39	GLN	MCH	BRI	CAL	RCH	NHA	DOV	KAN	TAL	CLT	MAR	ATL	TEX	PHO	HOM	41st	1263	
2009	Mayfield Motorsports	41	Toyota	DAY	CAL	LVS	ATL	BRI	MAR	TEX	PHO	TAL	RCH	DAR	CLT; DNQ	DOV	POC	MCH	SON	NHA	DAY	CHI	IND	POC	GLN	MCH	BRI	ATL	RCH	NHA	DOV	KAN	CAL	CLT	MAR	TAL	TEX	PHO	HOM	N/A	—	
2010	Whitney Motorsports	46	Dodge	DAY	CAL	LVS	ATL	BRI	MAR	PHO	TEX	TAL	RCH	DAR; 41	DOV; 37	CLT; 34	POC; 37	MCH; 39	SON; 26	NHA; 39	DAY; 19	CHI; DNQ	IND; DNQ	POC; 38	GLN; DNQ	MCH; DNQ	BRI; DNQ													44th	891	
2010	Tommy Baldwin Racing	36	Chevy																									ATL; 40	RCH	NHA		KAN; 42	CAL; 42	CLT; 43			TEX; DNQ		HOM; 42	44th	891	
2010	Whitney Motorsports	81	Dodge																												DOV; 42				MAR; 39	TAL				44th	891	
2010	Latitude 43 Motorsports	26	Ford																																			PHO; 31		44th	891	
2011	Whitney Motorsports	46	Chevy	DAY; 43	PHO; 37	LVS; 40	BRI; 40	CAL; 41	MAR; 41	TEX; 41	TAL	RCH; 43	DAR; 39	DOV; 40	CLT; 42	KAN; 38	POC; 42	MCH; 39	SON	DAY; DNQ	KEN; 40																			35th	192	
2011	Front Row Motorsports	38	Ford																			NHA; 23						ATL; 25		CHI; 34	NHA; 27	DOV; 34		CLT; 22				PHO; 28		35th	192	
2011	Front Row Motorsports	55	Ford																				IND; DNQ	POC; 43	GLN; 42	MCH; 43	BRI; DNQ		RCH; 42				KAN; 43		TAL; 42	MAR; 40	TEX; 43		HOM; 41	35th	192	
2012	Robinson-Blakeney Racing	49	Toyota	DAY; DNQ	PHO; 26	LVS; 43	BRI; 30	CAL; 35	MAR; 37	TEX; 33	KAN; 31	RCH; DNQ	TAL; DNQ	DAR; 37	CLT; DNQ	DOV; 34	POC; 36	MCH; 37	SON; 33	KEN; DNQ	DAY; 40	NHA; 43																		38th	166	
2012	Tommy Baldwin Racing	10	Chevy																				IND; 39		GLN; 40															38th	166	
2012	Max Q Motorsports	37	Chevy																					POC; 40		MCH; DNQ	BRI; DNQ	ATL; 40	RCH; DNQ	CHI; DNQ	NHA; 41			CLT; 42	KAN; 42	MAR; DNQ	TEX; 42	PHO; DNQ	HOM; 35	38th	166	
2012	Tommy Baldwin Racing	36	Chevy																													DOV; 34	TAL							38th	166	
2013	Tommy Baldwin Racing	36	Chevy	DAY; 10	PHO; 28	LVS; 36	BRI; 27	CAL; 27	MAR; 27	TEX; 39	KAN; 35	RCH; 32	TAL; 31	DAR; 35	CLT; 28	DOV; 30	POC; 39	MCH; 24		KEN; 32	DAY; 13	NHA; 29	IND; 39	POC; 25	GLN	MCH; 43	BRI; 24	ATL; 30	RCH; 36	CHI; 25	NHA; 33	DOV; 34	KAN; 27	CLT; 43	TAL; 28	MAR; 30	TEX; 30	PHO; 29	HOM; 32	32nd	472	
2013	Max Q Motorsports	37	Chevy																SON; 42																					32nd	472	
2014	Xxxtreme Motorsport	44	Chevy	DAY	PHO	LVS; DNQ	BRI; Wth	CAL	MAR	TEX; DNQ	DAR; Wth		TAL; DNQ	KAN; 41	CLT; DNQ	DOV; 39	POC; 38	MCH; 36	SON; 34	KEN	DAY	NHA	IND	POC	GLN															65th	0^{1}	
2014	Xxxtreme Motorsport	30	Chevy									RCH; 40																												65th	0^{1}	
2014	BK Racing	83	Toyota																							MCH; 30							KAN; 29	CLT; 38	TAL; 42	MAR; 39	TEX; 31	PHO; 30	HOM; 37	65th	0^{1}	
2014	Go FAS Racing	32	Ford																								BRI; 33	ATL; 32				DOV; 39								65th	0^{1}	
2014	BK Racing	93	Toyota																										RCH; 43	CHI	NHA									65th	0^{1}	
2015	BK Racing	23	Toyota	DAY; 40	ATL; 34	LVS; 36	PHO; 31	CAL; 37	MAR; 26	TEX; 43	BRI; 32	RCH; QL^{‡}	TAL; 14	KAN; 37	CLT; 38	DOV; 29	POC; 36	MCH; 38	SON; 41	DAY; 33	KEN; 39	NHA; 43	IND; 39	POC; 30	GLN; 30	MCH; 38	BRI; 34													57th	0^{1}	
2015	BK Racing	26	Toyota																									DAR; 34	RCH; 34	CHI; 35	NHA	DOV; 35	CLT; 33	KAN; 42	TAL; 38	MAR; 29	TEX; 33	PHO; 29	HOM; 34	57th	0^{1}	
2017	Tommy Baldwin Racing	7	Chevy	DAY	ATL	LVS	PHO	CAL	MAR	TEX; 27	BRI	RCH	TAL	KAN	CLT; 26	DOV	POC	MCH	SON	DAY	KEN	NHA	IND; 37	POC	GLN	MCH	BRI; 30	DAR	RCH	CHI	NHA	DOV	CLT	TAL	KAN	MAR	TEX	PHO	HOM	57th	0^{1}	
2018	Premium Motorsports	55	Chevy	DAY	ATL	LVS	PHO	CAL	MAR; 31	TEX	BRI	RCH	TAL	DOV	KAN																									56th	0^{1}	
2018	NY Racing Team	7	Chevy													CLT; 38																								56th	0^{1}	
2018	Premium Motorsports	7	Chevy														POC; 32	SON	MCH	CHI							BRI; 32													56th	0^{1}	
2018	BK Racing	23	Toyota																		DAY; 18	KEN; 38	NHA	POC; 28	GLN	MCH			IND; 29	LVS; 17	RCH	ROV; 28	DOV; 32		KAN; 31	MAR; 31	TEX; 36	PHO; 38		56th	0^{1}	
2018	Rick Ware Racing	52	Chevy																									DAR; 31												56th	0^{1}	
2018	BK Racing	23	Ford																															TAL; 36					HOM; 32	56th	0^{1}	
2019	Rick Ware Racing	52	Chevy	DAY	ATL	LVS	PHO	CAL	MAR	TEX	BRI	RCH	TAL	DOV	KAN	CLT	POC; 34	MCH										DAR; 32												46th	0^{1}	
2019	Rick Ware Racing	51	Chevy																SON; 38	CHI												ROV; 29								46th	0^{1}	
2019	Rick Ware Racing	52	Ford																		DAY; 12	KEN	NHA	POC	GLN	MCH					RCH; 33		DOV; 32	TAL						46th	0^{1}	
2019	Rick Ware Racing	54	Ford																								BRI; 28													46th	0^{1}	
2019	Rick Ware Racing	54	Chevy																										IND; 26											46th	0^{1}	
2019	Rick Ware Racing	53	Ford																											LVS; 32							TEX; 26	PHO; 29		46th	0^{1}	
2019	Rick Ware Racing	51	Ford																																KAN; 30				HOM; 30	46th	0^{1}	
2019	Rick Ware Racing	53	Chevy																																	MAR; 28				46th	0^{1}	
2020	Rick Ware Racing	54	Ford	DAY; DNQ																																				46th	0^{3}	
2020	Rick Ware Racing	52	Ford		LVS; 28	CAL; 31	PHO; 26																																	46th	0^{3}	
2020	Rick Ware Racing	27	Ford					DAR; 28						MAR; 31	HOM; 38		POC; 31	POC; 28	IND; 21	KEN; 30		KAN; 22	NHA; 29	MCH; 26	MCH; 29	DRC; 34	DOV; 31	DOV; 38		DAR; 30	RCH; 34							MAR; 31		46th	0^{3}	
2020	Spire Motorsports	77	Chevy						DAR; 28		CLT; 34		ATL; 36								TEX; 24												LVS; 33	TAL	ROV; 35					46th	0^{3}	
2020	Tommy Baldwin Racing	7	Chevy							CLT; 37		BRI; 25																												46th	0^{3}	
2020	Rick Ware Racing	53	Chevy													TAL; 36																								46th	0^{3}	
2020	Rick Ware Racing	27	Chevy																										DAY; 40							KAN; 30	TEX; 40		PHO; 30	46th	0^{3}	
2020	Premium Motorsports	15	Chevy																													BRI; 30								46th	0^{3}	
2021	Rick Ware Racing	53	Chevy	DAY	DRC	HOM	LVS	PHO	ATL	BRD; 28	MAR; 25	RCH			DAR; 28	DOV	COA	CLT	SON												RCH; 34									58th	0^{1}	
2021	Rick Ware Racing	15	Chevy										TAL; 26	KAN																										58th	0^{1}	
2021	Rick Ware Racing	51	Chevy																	NSH; 27	POC	POC	ROA	ATL	NHA	GLN	IND	MCH	DAY	DAR		BRI; 27								58th	0^{1}	
2021	MBM Motorsports	66	Toyota																														LVS; 38	TAL	CLT	TEX	KAN	MAR	PHO	58th	0^{1}	
2022	MBM Motorsports	55	Ford	DAY; DNQ	CAL	LVS	PHO	ATL	COA				TAL; 25	DOV																										52nd	0^{1}	
2022	Rick Ware Racing	15	Ford							RCH; 33	MAR; 34	BRD; 30			DAR; 23	KAN; 31	CLT	GTW	SON	NSH; 28	ROA	ATL	NHA; 29	POC; 28	IRC	MCH; 35	RCH; 32	GLN	DAY	DAR; 34	KAN; 28	BRI; 23	TEX	TAL; 31		LVS; 31	HOM; 32	MAR; 30	PHO	52nd	0^{1}	
2022	Rick Ware Racing	51	Ford																																ROV; 32					52nd	0^{1}	
2023	Rick Ware Racing	15	Ford	DAY	CAL; 23	LVS; 33	PHO	ATL; 26	COA	RCH; 36	BRD; 20	MAR; 36					CLT; 16					ATL; 7	NHA	POC; 26	RCH; 35	MCH; 27	IRC	GLN		DAR; 30	KAN; 34	BRI; 26	TEX; 32				HOM; 33	MAR; 35	PHO; 27	44th	0^{1}	
2023	Rick Ware Racing	51	Ford										TAL; 11	DOV; 28	KAN; 23	DAR		GTW; 24	SON	NSH; 29	CSC								DAY; 19					TAL; 36	ROV	LVS; 29				44th	0^{1}	
2024	NY Racing Team	44	Chevy	DAY; DNQ	ATL	LVS; 34	PHO	BRI	COA	RCH	MAR	TEX	TAL	DOV	KAN	DAR	CLT; 40	GTW	SON	IOW	NHA	NSH	CSC	POC; 35	IND	RCH	MCH	DAY	DAR	ATL; 23	GLN	BRI	KAN; 37	TAL; 27	ROV	LVS	HOM; 38	MAR	PHO; 35	54th	0^{1}	
2025	NY Racing Team	44	Chevy	DAY; DNQ	ATL; 37	COA	PHO	LVS	HOM; 35	MAR	DAR; 38	BRI	TAL; 32	TEX	KAN	CLT	NSH; 34	MCH	MXC	POC	ATL	CSC	SON	DOV; 34	IND	IOW	GLN; 38	RCH	DAY	DAR	GTW	BRI	NHA	KAN; 34	ROV	LVS; 30	TAL	MAR	PHO; 32	57th	0^{1}	
2026	NY Racing Team	44	Chevy	DAY; DNQ	ATL; 31	COA	PHO	LVS	DAR	MAR	BRI	KAN	TAL	TEX	GLN	CLT	NSH	MCH; 21	POC	COR	SON	CHI; 35	ATL	NWS	IND	IOW	RCH	NHA	DAY	DAR	GTW	BRI	KAN	LVS	CLT	PHO	TAL	MAR	HOM; 36	45th	0^{1}	
^{†} – Qualified for Tony Stewart · ^{‡} – Qualified but replaced by Jeb Burton

===== Daytona 500 =====
Year	Team	Manufacturer	Start	Finish
2006	Joe Gibbs Racing	Chevrolet	36	41
2007	Joe Gibbs Racing	Chevrolet	12	12
2008	Hall of Fame Racing	Toyota	37	25
2011	Whitney Motorsports	Chevrolet	33	43
2012	Robinson-Blakeney Racing	Toyota	DNQ	
2013	Tommy Baldwin Racing	Chevrolet	41	10
2015	BK Racing	Toyota	25	40
2020	Rick Ware Racing	Ford	DNQ	
2022	MBM Motorsports	Ford	DNQ	
2024	NY Racing Team	Chevrolet	DNQ	
2025	NY Racing Team	Chevrolet	DNQ	
2026	NY Racing Team	Chevrolet	DNQ	

==== O'Reilly Auto Parts Series ====
NASCAR O'Reilly Auto Parts Series results
Year	Team	No.	Make	1	2	3	4	5	6	7	8	9	10	11	12	13	14	15	16	17	18	19	20	21	22	23	24	25	26	27	28	29	30	31	32	33	34	35	NOAPSC	Pts	Ref
2004	Joe Gibbs Racing	18	Chevy	DAY	CAR	LVS; 23	DAR	BRI	TEX; 42	NSH; 19	TAL	CAL; 23	GTW; 16	RCH; 23	NZH	CLT; DNQ	DOV; 26	NSH; 8	KEN; 11	MLW	DAY	CHI; 9	NHA	PPR	IRP	MCH	BRI; 15	CAL	RCH; 15	DOV; 35	KAN; 6	CLT	MEM	ATL; 10	PHO; 15	DAR	HOM		30th	1859	
2004	Ware Racing Enterprises	51	Chevy													CLT; 15																							30th	1859	
2005	Joe Gibbs Racing	18	Chevy	DAY; 20	CAL; 23	MXC; 42	LVS; 18	ATL; 34	NSH; 38	BRI; 21	TEX; 22	PHO; 10	TAL; 38	DAR; 20	RCH; 24	CLT; 27	DOV; 18	NSH; 8	KEN; 7	MLW; 4	DAY; 42	CHI; 18	NHA; 6	PPR; 5	GTW; 9	IRP; 13	GLN; 10	MCH; 5	BRI; 30	CAL; 43	RCH; 19	DOV; 20	KAN; 10	CLT; 22	MEM; 2	TEX; 25	PHO; 10	HOM; 28	11th	3711	
2006	Joe Gibbs Racing	18	Chevy	**DAY**; 8	CAL; 7	MXC; 4	LVS; 8	ATL; 5	BRI; 29	TEX; 42	NSH; 4	PHO; 11	**TAL**; 34	RCH; 31	DAR; 9	CLT; 3	DOV; 9	NSH; 16	KEN; 2	MLW; 3	**DAY**; 4	CHI; 10	NHA; 8	MAR; 9	GTW; 37	IRP; 3	GLN; 11	MCH; 9	BRI; 12	CAL; 40	RCH; 13	DOV; 9	KAN; 11	CLT; 32	MEM; 10	TEX; 6	PHO; 6	HOM; 5	5th	4487	
2007	Phoenix Racing	1	Chevy	DAY; DNQ	CAL; 23	MXC; 37	LVS; 19	ATL; 22	BRI; 22	NSH; 12	TEX; 18	PHO; 24	TAL; 17	RCH; 12	DAR; 16	CLT; 26	DOV; 25	NSH; 18	KEN; 12	MLW	NHA; 36	DAY; 22	CHI; 11	GTW; 9	IRP; 16	CGV	GLN	MCH; 17	BRI; 39	CAL; 34	RCH; 19	DOV	KAN; 33	CLT; 37		TEX; 33	PHO; 11	HOM; 40	17th	2889	
2007	Joe Gibbs Racing	20	Chevy																																MEM; 11				17th	2889	
2009	MacDonald Motorsports	81	Dodge	DAY	CAL	LVS	BRI	TEX	NSH	PHO	TAL	RCH	DAR	CLT	DOV	NSH	KEN	MLW	NHA	DAY	CHI	GTW	IRP	IOW	GLN	MCH; 21	BRI	CGV	ATL	RCH	DOV	KAN	CAL	CLT	MEM	TEX	PHO	HOM	130th	100	
2010	Specialty Racing	61	Ford	DAY	CAL	LVS	BRI	NSH	PHO	TEX	TAL	RCH	DAR	DOV	CLT	NSH	KEN	ROA	NHA	DAY	CHI	GTW	IRP	IOW	GLN	MCH	BRI; DNQ	CGV	ATL	RCH	DOV	KAN	CAL	CLT	GTW	TEX	PHO	HOM	N/A	–	
2011	Baker Curb Racing	27	Ford	DAY	PHO	LVS; 34	BRI; 39	CAL																															131st	0^{1}	
2011	Mike Harmon Racing	74	Chevy						TEX; 40	TAL	NSH	RCH	DAR	DOV	IOW	CLT	CHI	MCH; 39	ROA	DAY	KEN	NHA	NSH	IRP	IOW			BRI; DNQ	ATL	RCH									131st	0^{1}	
2011	MacDonald Motorsports	82	Dodge																							GLN; 41	CGV												131st	0^{1}	
2011	Go Canada Racing	27	Ford																												CHI; 42	DOV	KAN; 43	CLT	TEX; 38	PHO	HOM		131st	0^{1}	
2012	Robinson-Blakeney Racing	28	Chevy	DAY; 40																																			134th	0^{1}	
2012	GC Motorsports International	27	Ford		PHO; 37	LVS; 38	BRI; 39	CAL	TEX																						DOV; 23								134th	0^{1}	
2012	Vision Racing	17	Toyota							RCH; 37	TAL	DAR	IOW	CLT	DOV	MCH	ROA	KEN	DAY	NHA	CHI	IND	IOW																134th	0^{1}	
2012	The Motorsports Group	40	Chevy																					GLN; 31	CGV	BRI													134th	0^{1}	
2012	The Motorsports Group	47	Chevy																								ATL; 42	RCH; 41	CHI; 40	KEN		CLT; 38	KAN; 40	TEX; 41	PHO; 38	HOM; DNQ			134th	0^{1}	
2013	The Motorsports Group	42	Chevy	DAY	PHO	LVS; QL^{†}	BRI; 38	CAL; 38	TEX; 39	RCH; 39	TAL	DAR; 38	CLT; DNQ																										127th	0^{1}	
2013	The Motorsports Group	46	Chevy											DOV; 37	IOW	MCH; 38	ROA	KEN; 37	DAY	NHA; 39	CHI	IND; 37	IOW	GLN	MOH	BRI; 38	ATL	RCH; 40	CHI; 39	KEN	DOV; 36	KAN; 38	CLT; DNQ	TEX	PHO	HOM			127th	0^{1}	
2014	JGL Racing	93	Dodge	DAY	PHO	LVS; 21	BRI	CAL; 19	TEX; 16																														17th	651^{2}	
2014	JGL Racing	28	Dodge							DAR; 14	RCH; 18	TAL; 7	IOW; 18	CLT; 21	DOV; 28	MCH; 21	ROA; 5	KEN; 22	DAY; 35	NHA; 17	CHI; 14	IND; 24	IOW; 17	GLN; 35	MOH; 26	BRI; 30	ATL; 16	RCH; 31	CHI; 25	KEN; 23	DOV; 22	KAN; 18	CLT; 39	TEX; 20	PHO; 30				17th	651^{2}	
2014	JGL Racing	28	Toyota																																	HOM; 16			17th	651^{2}	
2015	JGL Racing	28	Toyota	DAY; 27	ATL; 19	LVS; 16	PHO; 24	CAL; 22	TEX; 19	BRI; 33	RCH; 19	TAL; 4	IOW; 34	CLT; 21	DOV; 18	MCH; 25	CHI; 16	DAY; 20	KEN; 18	NHA; 15	IND; 18	IOW; 18	GLN; 12	MOH; 16	BRI; 19	ROA; 35	DAR; 16	RCH; 20	CHI; 19	KEN; 15	DOV; 12	CLT; 19	KAN; 21	TEX; 23	PHO; 17	HOM; 21			12th	803	
2016	TriStar Motorsports	14	Toyota	DAY	ATL; 19	LVS; 21	PHO; 20	CAL; 27	TEX; 38	BRI; 38																													14th	706	
2016	TriStar Motorsports	44	Toyota								RCH; 12	TAL; 22	DOV; 11	CLT; 23	POC; 13	MCH; 20	IOW; 20	DAY; 17	KEN; 17	NHA; 16	IND; 19	IOW; 14	GLN; 15	MOH; 35	BRI; 27	ROA; 10	DAR; 14	RCH; 20	CHI; 14	KEN; 14	DOV; 8	CLT; 27	KAN; 10	TEX; 17	PHO; 17	HOM; 13			14th	706	
2017	TriStar Motorsports	14	Toyota	DAY; 25	ATL; 36	LVS; 22	PHO; 16	CAL; 16	TEX; 22	BRI; 11	RCH; 39	TAL; 11	CLT; 22	DOV; 15	POC; 19	MCH; 38	IOW; 13	DAY; 13	KEN; 25	NHA; 15	IND; 15	IOW; 6	GLN; 39	MOH; 13	BRI; 16	ROA; 17	DAR; 19	RCH; 20	CHI; 21	KEN; 19	DOV; 17	CLT; 19	KAN; 20	TEX; 18	PHO; 20	HOM; 22			14th	588	
2018	RSS Racing	39	Chevy	DAY; 18						BRI; 37																													28th	276	
2018	RSS Racing	93	Chevy		ATL; 37	LVS; 38											IOW; 40								BRI; 40	ROA										HOM; 36			28th	276	
2018	RSS Racing	38	Chevy				PHO; 21	CAL; 34	TEX; 31		RCH; 15	TAL; 11	DOV; 36	CLT; 36	POC; 34	MCH; 20		CHI; 18	DAY; 16	KEN; 34	NHA; 36	IOW	GLN; 34	MOH; 32			DAR; 30	IND; 30	LVS; 11	RCH; 25	ROV; 40	DOV; 33		TEX; 15	PHO; 21				28th	276	
2018	RSS Racing	37	Chevy																														KAN; 35						28th	276	
2019	RSS Racing	38	Chevy	DAY	ATL	LVS	PHO	CAL	TEX	BRI	RCH	TAL	DOV	CLT	POC	MCH	IOW	CHI	DAY	KEN	NHA	IOW; 38	GLN; 35	MOH; 37		ROA; 38	DAR; 36	IND; 38	LVS; 37				KAN; 37	TEX; 38	PHO; 37	HOM; 36			58th	30	
2019	RSS Racing	93	Chevy																						BRI; 16							DOV; 32							58th	30	
2019	B. J. McLeod Motorsports	78	Toyota																											RCH; 21	ROV; 38								58th	30	
2020	Jimmy Means Racing	52	Chevy	DAY; 12	LVS; 22	CAL; 25																																	80th	0^{1}	
2020	B. J. McLeod Motorsports	99	Chevy				PHO; DNQ	DAR	CLT	BRI	ATL																												80th	0^{1}	
2020	SS-Green Light Racing	07	Chevy									HOM; 11	HOM	TAL	POC	IRC	KEN	KEN	TEX	KAN	ROA	DRC	DOV	DOV	DAY	DAR	RCH	RCH	BRI	LVS	TAL	ROV	KAN	TEX					80th	0^{1}	
2020	Rick Ware Racing	17	Ford																																MAR; 14				80th	0^{1}	
2020	MBM Motorsports	61	Toyota																																	PHO; 26			80th	0^{1}	
2021	SS-Green Light Racing with Rick Ware Racing	17	Chevy	DAY	DRC	HOM; 12	LVS	PHO; 13	ATL	MAR; 24	TAL	DAR; 22										NHA; 23	GLN	IRC; 22	MCH	DAY; 13	DAR	RCH; 29	BRI	LVS; 37			TEX; 40	KAN	MAR; 16				30th	267	
2021	Our Motorsports	23	Chevy										DOV; 14	COA	CLT	MOH	TEX																						30th	267	
2021	SS-Green Light Racing with Rick Ware Racing	07	Chevy															NSH; 22	POC	ROA	ATL															PHO; 22			30th	267	
2021	B. J. McLeod Motorsports	99	Chevy																												TAL; 16	ROV; 19							30th	267	
2022	MBM Motorsports	66	Chevy	DAY; 13								TAL; 36														DAY; 9					TAL; 18								24th	345	
2022	MBM Motorsports	66	Toyota		CAL; 22				COA; 29		MAR; 31		DOV; 23				PIR; 8		ROA; DNQ		NHA; 23		IRC; DNQ				DAR; 32		BRI; 33			ROV; 19	LVS; 36		MAR; 34				24th	345	
2022	MBM Motorsports	66	Ford			LVS; 20	PHO; 25	ATL; 11		RCH; 32				DAR; 25	TEX; 31	CLT; 18				ATL; 36		POC; 28		MCH; 20	GLN			KAN; 22		TEX; 34				HOM; 38		PHO; 30			24th	345	
2022	MBM Motorsports	13	Toyota															NSH; 33																					24th	345	
2023	SS-Green Light Racing	07	Chevy	DAY	CAL	LVS	PHO	ATL	COA	RCH	MAR	TAL	DOV	DAR	CLT	POR	SON	NSH	CSC	ATL	NHA	POC	ROA	MCH	IND	GLN	DAY; 30	DAR	KAN	BRI									57th	20	
2023	SS-Green Light Racing	08	Ford																												TEX; 28	ROV	LVS			PHO; 36			57th	20	
2023	JD Motorsports	4	Chevy																															HOM; DNQ	MAR; 34				57th	20	
2024	SS-Green Light Racing	14	Chevy	DAY	ATL; 24	LVS; 24	PHO; 19	COA	RCH	MAR	TEX	TAL																											39th	90	
2024	Joey Gase Motorsports	35	Toyota										DOV; 38	DAR																									39th	90	
2024	SS-Green Light Racing	14	Ford												CLT; 21	PIR	SON	IOW	NHA	NSH	CSC	POC	IND	MCH	DAY	DAR	ATL	GLN	BRI	KAN; 20	TAL	ROV	LVS; 25	HOM	MAR	PHO			39th	90	
2025	RSS Racing	29	Ford	DAY; DNQ	ATL	COA	PHO	LVS	HOM	MAR	DAR	BRI																											68th	9	
2025	Joey Gase Motorsports with Scott Osteen	53	Chevy										CAR; QL^{‡}	TAL	TEX	CLT; 28	NSH	MXC	POC	ATL	CSC	SON	DOV	IND	IOW	GLN	DAY	PIR	GTW	BRI	KAN	ROV	LVS	TAL	MAR	PHO			68th	9	
2026	Young's Motorsports	42	Chevy	DAY	ATL	COA; 28	PHO	LVS																															37th	84	
2026	Hettinger Racing	5	Ford						DAR; 25	MAR	CAR; 20	BRI; 26	KAN	TAL; 11	TEX	GLN	DOV																						37th	84	
2026	RSS Racing	38	Ford															CLT; 34	NSH; 38	POC	COR	SON	CHI; 37	ATL	IND; 38	IOW	DAY	DAR	GTW	BRI; 38	LVS	CLT; 38	PHO	TAL	MAR	HOM; 38			37th	84	
^{†} – Qualified for Chase Miller · ^{‡} – Qualified but replaced by Katherine Legge

==== Craftsman Truck Series ====
NASCAR Craftsman Truck Series results
Year	Team	No.	Make	1	2	3	4	5	6	7	8	9	10	11	12	13	14	15	16	17	18	19	20	21	22	23	24	25	NCTC	Pts	Ref
2004	Morgan-Dollar Motorsports	47	Chevy	DAY	ATL	MAR	MFD	CLT	DOV	TEX	MEM	MLW	KAN	KEN	GTW	MCH; 13	IRP	NSH	BRI	RCH	NHA	LVS	CAL	TEX	MAR	PHO	DAR	HOM	84th	124	
2009	Tagsby Racing	65	Chevy	DAY	CAL	ATL	MAR	KAN; 16	CLT	DOV																			42nd	385	
2009	Tagsby Racing	73	Chevy								TEX; 23	MCH; 20	MLW	MEM; 25	KEN; 25	IRP	NSH	BRI	CHI	IOW	GTW	NHA	LVS	MAR	TAL	TEX	PHO	HOM	42nd	385	
2010	Daisy Ramirez Motorsports	01	Chevy	DAY; 10	ATL	MAR	NSH	KAN	DOV	CLT	TEX	MCH	IOW	GTW	IRP	POC	NSH	DAR	BRI	CHI	KEN	NHA	LVS	MAR	TAL	TEX	PHO	HOM	87th	139	
2011	SS-Green Light Racing	07	Toyota	DAY	PHO	DAR	MAR	NSH	DOV	CLT; 34																			98th	0^{1}	
2011	Tagsby Racing	73	Chevy								KAN; 32	TEX	KEN	IOW	NSH	IRP	POC												98th	0^{1}	
2011	Norm Benning Racing	75	Chevy															MCH; 31	BRI	ATL									98th	0^{1}	
2011	Turn One Racing	66	Chevy																		CHI; 30	NHA; 28	KEN	LVS	TAL; 36	MAR	TEX	HOM	98th	0^{1}	
2013	RSS Racing	38	Chevy	DAY	MAR	CAR	KAN; 35	CLT	DOV	TEX	KEN	IOW	ELD						CHI; 34	LVS	TAL	MAR							105th	0^{1}	
2013	SS-Green Light Racing	07	Toyota											POC; 33											HOM; 36				105th	0^{1}	
2013	SS-Green Light Racing	07	Chevy												MCH; 24	BRI	MSP	IOW					TEX; 33	PHO; 35					105th	0^{1}	
2014	SS-Green Light Racing	07	Chevy	DAY	MAR	KAN	CLT; QL^{†}	DOV	TEX	GTW	KEN; 29	IOW	ELD	POC	MCH	BRI	MSP	CHI	NHA	LVS	TAL	MAR	TEX	PHO	HOM				108th	0^{1}	
2016	SS-Green Light Racing	07	Chevy	DAY	ATL; 24	MAR	KAN	DOV	CLT	TEX	IOW	GTW	KEN	ELD	POC	BRI	MCH	MSP	CHI	NHA	LVS	TAL	MAR	TEX	PHO	HOM			103rd	0^{1}	
2017	AM Racing	22	Toyota	DAY; 9																									84th	0^{1}	
2017	Copp Motorsports	63	Chevy		ATL; DNQ	MAR	KAN																	TEX; 29	PHO	HOM			84th	0^{1}	
2017	Copp Motorsports	83	Chevy					CLT; 15					KEN; 17	ELD; 21	POC	MCH	BRI; 19	MSP	CHI	NHA	LVS	TAL	MAR						84th	0^{1}	
2017	Copp Motorsports	36	Chevy						DOV; 29	TEX	GTW																		84th	0^{1}	
2017	Norm Benning Racing	57	Chevy									IOW; 32																	84th	0^{1}	
2018	Copp Motorsports	63	Chevy	DAY	ATL	LVS	MAR	DOV	KAN	CLT; 32	TEX	IOW; 32	GTW	CHI; 29	KEN	ELD													109th	0^{1}	
2018	Reaume Brothers Racing	34	Chevy														POC; 31	MCH	BRI	MSP									109th	0^{1}	
2018	Reaume Brothers Racing	33	Toyota																		LVS; DNQ	TAL	MAR	TEX	PHO	HOM			109th	0^{1}	
2019	Reaume Brothers Racing	34	Toyota	DAY	ATL	LVS	MAR	TEX	DOV	KAN	CLT	TEX	IOW	GTW	CHI	KEN	POC	ELD	MCH	BRI; 31	MSP	LVS	TAL	MAR	PHO	HOM			113th	0^{1}	
2020	Reaume Brothers Racing	00	Toyota	DAY	LVS	CLT	ATL	HOM	POC	KEN	TEX	KAN	KAN	MCH	DRC	DOV; 26	GTW	DAR	RCH	BRI	LVS	TAL	KAN	TEX	MAR	PHO			73rd	11^{3}	
2021	CMI Motorsports	49	Toyota	DAY	DRC	LVS	ATL	BRD	RCH	KAN	DAR	COA	CLT	TEX	NSH; DNQ	POC	KNX	GLN	GTW	DAR	BRI	LVS	TAL	MAR	PHO				124th	0^{1}	
2025	Spire Motorsports	7	Chevy	DAY	ATL	LVS	HOM	MAR	BRI	CAR	TEX	KAN	NWS	CLT	NSH	MCH	POC	LRP	IRP	GLN	RCH	DAR	BRI	NHA	ROV	TAL; 13	MAR	PHO	94th	0^{1}	
^{†} – Qualified for Blake Koch

^{*} Season still in progress
^{1} Ineligible for series points
^{2} Yeley switched to Nationwide Series points before the race at Auto Club Speedway
^{3} Yeley switched to Truck Series points before the race at Dover International Speedway

=== ARCA Re/Max Series ===
(key) (Bold – Pole position awarded by qualifying time. Italics – Pole position earned by points standings or practice time. * – Most laps led.)

ARCA Re/Max Series results
Year	Team	No.	Make	1	2	3	4	5	6	7	8	9	10	11	12	13	14	15	16	17	18	19	20	21	22	23	ARMC	Pts	Ref
2005	Joe Gibbs Racing	2	Chevy	DAY; 3	NSH	SLM	KEN	TOL	LAN	MIL	POC	MCH	KAN	KEN	BLN	POC	GTW	LER	NSH	MCH	ISF	TOL	DSF	CHI	SLM	TAL	103rd	215	

==== Whelen Modified Tour ====
NASCAR Whelen Modified Tour results
Year	Car owner	No.	Make	1	2	3	4	5	6	7	8	9	10	11	12	13	14	15	16	NWMTC	Pts	Ref
2007	Kevin Manion	7	Chevy	TMP	STA	WTO	STA	TMP	NHA	TSA	RIV	STA	TMP	MAN	MAR	NHA; 27	TMP	STA	TMP	63rd	82	

=== International Race of Champions ===
(key) (Bold – Pole position. * – Most laps led.)

International Race of Champions results
Year	Make	1	2	3	4	Pos.	Points	Ref
2004	Pontiac	DAY; 11	TEX; 10	RCH; 7	ATL; 12	12th	22	
