= Steve Lewis (racing) =

American motor racing owner

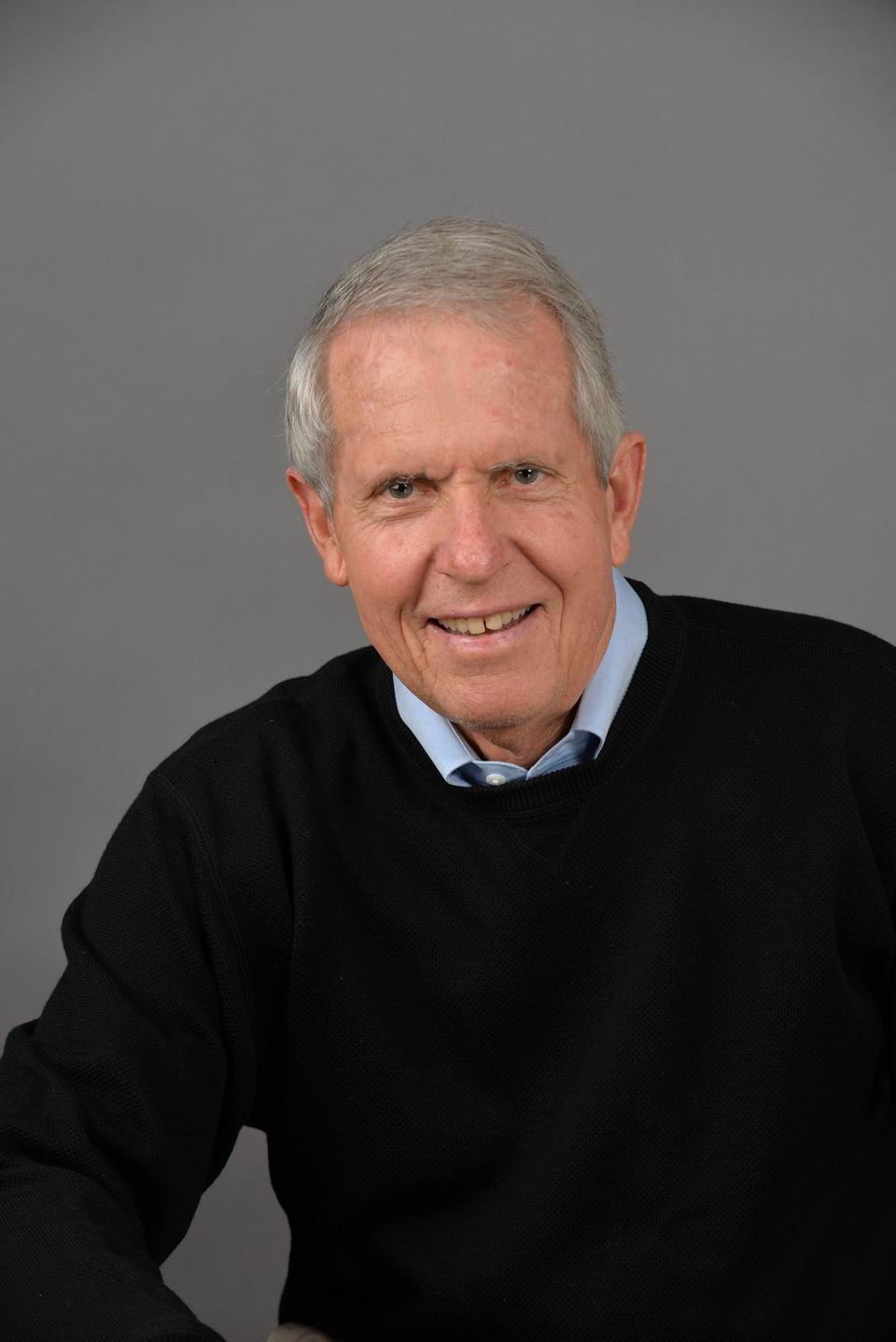
- Lewis in 2014
- Born: Colton, California, U.S.
- Education: Colton High School
- Alma mater: San Jose State University
- Occupations: Owner, Nine Racing, Inc., magazine publisher, trade show producer
- Children: Michael James Lewis
- Website: Stevelewis.info

Steve Lewis is an American businessman, magazine publisher and trade show producer. He is the owner of Nine Racing and the founder of Performance Racing Industry.

== Early life and education ==
Steve Lewis grew up in Colton, California, where he followed auto racing from an early age. While in high school, his weekly ritual consisted of attending events at Southern California race tracks, including midget races at Orange Show Speedway; drag races at Fontana, Riverside Raceway, and Colton Drag Strip; and occasionally visiting Ascot Park.

After graduation from Colton High School, he enrolled at San Bernardino Valley College, and then went on to San Jose State University to complete a bachelor's degree and an MBA with an emphasis in marketing.

== Career ==
Lewis began his business career at United Airlines, and then spent 10 years in sales at the William Lawrence Corporation, which produced the Motorcycle and Accessory Trade Show, and published Motorcycle Dealer News Magazine.

In the fall of 1978, Lewis and business partner Jeff Wetmore developed the concepts for trade shows and trade magazines for the surf lifestyle with Action Sports Retailer and the backpacking and camping industries with Outdoor Retailer. He then launched Performance Racing Industry Magazine and Trade Show in 1986, which are devoted to the hardcore auto racing industry. The trade show currently takes place annually in Indianapolis, Indiana, every December.

2009 Performance Racing Industry Trade Show

Race promotion is another aspect of Lewis's experience as he created and promoted the Twin 25 midget race events at Lucas Oil Raceway at Indianapolis and Irwindale Speedway. These events featured two 25-lap A-main races. A $50,000 bonus was available to the driver who could win both feature races, especially challenging since the winner of the first race had to start in last position in the second race. Lewis also produced the Sprint & Midget Classic events in Orlando, Florida, featuring sprint cars and Midget cars. He produced and promoted eight midget race events, all of which were shown on national television.

In 2012, Lewis sold Performance Racing Industry to the automotive aftermarket trade association SEMA (Specialty Equipment Market Association).

=== Nine Racing ===
Lewis began his Nine Racing team in 1978 with driver Stan Fox behind the wheel of the No. 9 midget race car. Nine Racing earned over 130 feature race wins and claimed 10 USAC National Midget Series Championships with drivers Stevie Reeves, Tony Stewart, Kenny Irwin Jr., Jason Leffler, Kasey Kahne, Dave Darland, J. J. Yeley, and Bobby East.

== Personal life ==
Steve Lewis is the father of Michael James Lewis, a professional race car driver, who has competed in Pirelli World Challenge (2015-2016) driving a Porsche, IMSA Porsche GT3 Cup Challenge USA by Yokohama, Formula 3 Euro, Formula 3 Italia, and Formula BMW Americas and Europe.

== Honours ==
- Citing the impact of the Performance Racing Industry Trade Show, the trade show was listed in Trade Show Executive's Gold 100 Ranking of the Largest Shows of 2011. It was previously named as one of the 50 fastest growing trade shows in the United States by Tradeshow Week Magazine
- Lewis personally received a number of awards, including the USAC Roger McClusky Award of Excellence in 2009, the USAC Race Organizer of The Year Award in recognition for promotion effort for the TWIN 25’s Midget Race events in 2002, and the USAC Jim Blunk Award in recognition for outstanding contribution to midget auto racing in 1997.
- In 2006, Lewis was inducted into the High Banks Hall of Fame at the National Midget Auto Racing Museum in Belleville, Kansas, along with being inducted to the National Midget Auto Racing Hall of Fame in 2004.
- In December 2014 he received the prestigious SEMA – MPMC Hall of Fame induction at the PRI Trade Show.
