= Performance Racing Industry =

Performance Racing Industry was started in 1986 by Steve Lewis, owner of Laguna Coast Publishing, based in Laguna Beach, California. Now based in Aliso Viejo, California, the company operates PRI magazine, a monthly business publication for entrepreneurs in the auto racing industry; the Performance Racing Industry Trade Show, which launched in 1988 and showcases thousands of new racing products along with dozens of networking events and educational programs for motorsports professionals; and online properties including performanceracing.com.

Performance Racing Industry is also known in the racing industry as PRI. The PRI Trade Show has grown to become the world's largest racing trade show. It is now presented in Indianapolis, Indiana, every December. Tens of thousands of racing industry buyers from all 50 states and 70 countries come to the PRI Trade Show to view the latest products and services by more than 1,100 companies. The PRI Trade Show is not open to race fans; a person must demonstrate they are part of a racing business in order to be admitted.

2009 Performance Racing Industry Trade Show

Readers of PRI magazine and attendees at the PRI Trade Show are involved in such businesses as selling racing products in a retail store, building race engines professionally, building race cars professionally, operating professional race teams, warehouse distribution, operating a race track, promoting auto races and manufacturing racing components.

Racing components introduced at the PRI Trade Show each year apply to all forms of auto racing and karting, including drag racing, stock car racing, Open wheel racing, road racing and off-road racing, as well as diesel, performance marine, truck and tractor pulling, trailers and tow vehicle performance, and more.

Longtime editor John Kilroy was named publisher of PRI magazine in 2012, when the company was purchased by the Specialty Equipment Market Association. He was also vice president and general manager of the company until his retirement in 2016. SEMA Vice President and COO Bill Miller then assumed the additional role of PRI general manager until 2021, when Jim Liaw was named full-time GM. Meredith Kaplan Burns is the editor of PRI magazine since 2023. Other company principals include longtime Trade Show Director Karin Davidson and Sr. Art Director Paul Graff.

== History ==
The PRI Trade Show has been held in the following cities: Louisville, Cincinnati, Nashville, Columbus, Indianapolis and Orlando.

The first PRI Trade Show in Louisville in 1988 had 169 companies exhibiting in 238 booths. In 2022, the Show featured approximately 1,000 companies exhibiting in over 3,300 booths throughout the Indiana Convention Center and Lucas Oil Stadium.
