= 2013 AdvoCare 500 (Phoenix) =

Race details
- Race 35 of 36 in the 2013 NASCAR Sprint Cup Series
- Map of the Phoenix International Raceway (2011–2018)
- Date: November 10, 2013
- Location: Phoenix International Raceway in Avondale, Arizona
- Course: Permanent racing facility
- Course length: 1 miles (1.6 km)
- Distance: 312 laps, 312 mi (502.115 km)
- Average speed: 105.733 miles per hour (170.161 km/h)

Pole position
Driver	Jimmie Johnson	Hendrick Motorsports
- Time: 25.858

Most laps led
Driver	Kevin Harvick	Richard Childress Racing
- Laps: 70

Winner
No. 29	Kevin Harvick	Richard Childress Racing

Television in the United States
- Network: ESPN
- Announcers: Allen Bestwick, Dale Jarrett, and Andy Petree

The 2013 AdvoCare 500 was a NASCAR Sprint Cup Series stock car race held on November 10, 2013, at Phoenix International Raceway in Avondale, Arizona. Contested over 312 laps, it was the thirty-fifth as well as the ninth race in the Chase for the Sprint Cup during the 2013 NASCAR Sprint Cup Series season. The race was won by Kevin Harvick for Richard Childress Racing, his 22nd career victory and final win in RCR's No. 29 as he moved to Stewart–Haas Racing in 2014. Kasey Kahne finished second, and Jimmie Johnson finished third.

== Report ==
=== Entry list ===
(R) - Denotes rookie driver.

(i) - Denotes driver who is ineligible for series driver points.

No.	Driver	Team	Manufacturer	Sponsor
1	Jamie McMurray	Earnhardt Ganassi Racing	Chevrolet	Lexar
2	Brad Keselowski	Penske Racing	Ford	Miller Lite
5	Kasey Kahne	Hendrick Motorsports	Chevrolet	Farmers Insurance
7	Dave Blaney	Tommy Baldwin Racing	Chevrolet	Ultra Wheel
9	Marcos Ambrose	Richard Petty Motorsports	Ford	DeWalt / Stanley Tools
10	Danica Patrick (R)	Stewart–Haas Racing	Chevrolet	GoDaddy – It's Go Time
11	Denny Hamlin	Joe Gibbs Racing	Toyota	FedEx Ground
13	Casey Mears	Germain Racing	Ford	GEICO
14	Mark Martin	Stewart–Haas Racing	Chevrolet	Mobil 1 / Bass Pro Shops
15	Clint Bowyer	Michael Waltrip Racing	Toyota	5-hour Energy
16	Greg Biffle	Roush Fenway Racing	Ford	Scotch
17	Ricky Stenhouse Jr. (R)	Roush Fenway Racing	Ford	RFR Driven
18	Kyle Busch	Joe Gibbs Racing	Toyota	M&M's
20	Matt Kenseth	Joe Gibbs Racing	Toyota	Dollar General
22	Joey Logano	Penske Racing	Ford	Shell / Pennzoil
24	Jeff Gordon	Hendrick Motorsports	Chevrolet	Axalta
27	Paul Menard	Richard Childress Racing	Chevrolet	Rheem / Menards
29	Kevin Harvick	Richard Childress Racing	Chevrolet	Budweiser
30	Cole Whitt (i)	Swan Racing	Toyota	Lean1
31	Jeff Burton	Richard Childress Racing	Chevrolet	Caterpillar
32	Timmy Hill (R)	FAS Lane Racing	Ford	U.S. Chrome
33	Tony Raines (i)	Circle Sport	Chevrolet	Little Joe's Autos
34	David Ragan	Front Row Motorsports	Ford	Taco Bell
35	Josh Wise (i)	Front Row Motorsports	Ford	MDS Transport
36	J. J. Yeley	Tommy Baldwin Racing	Chevrolet	Accell Construction
38	David Gilliland	Front Row Motorsports	Ford	Long John Silver's
39	Ryan Newman	Stewart–Haas Racing	Chevrolet	Quicken Loans / Salute to Veteran's Day
40	Landon Cassill (i)	Circle Sport	Chevrolet	Circle Sport
42	Juan Pablo Montoya	Earnhardt Ganassi Racing	Chevrolet	Target
43	Aric Almirola	Richard Petty Motorsports	Ford	Smithfield
47	Bobby Labonte	JTG Daugherty Racing	Toyota	Wounded Warrior Project / Clorox
48	Jimmie Johnson	Hendrick Motorsports	Chevrolet	Lowe's / Kobalt Tools
51	Justin Allgaier (i)	HScott Motorsports	Chevrolet	BRANDT
55	Elliott Sadler (i)	Michael Waltrip Racing	Toyota	Aaron's Dream Machine
56	Martin Truex Jr.	Michael Waltrip Racing	Toyota	NAPA Auto Parts
78	Kurt Busch	Furniture Row Racing	Chevrolet	Furniture Row / Denver Mattress
83	David Reutimann	BK Racing	Toyota	Horizon Transport
87	Joe Nemechek (i)	NEMCO-Jay Robinson Racing	Toyota	NEMCO-Jay Robinson Racing
88	Dale Earnhardt Jr.	Hendrick Motorsports	Chevrolet	National Guard
93	Travis Kvapil	BK Racing	Toyota	Dr Pepper
95	Reed Sorenson (i)	Leavine Family Racing	Ford	Jetset Getset
98	Michael McDowell	Phil Parsons Racing	Ford	Phil Parsons Racing
99	Carl Edwards	Roush Fenway Racing	Ford	Fastenal
Official entry list

Previous race: 2013 AAA Texas 500	Sprint Cup Series; 2013 season	Next race: 2013 Ford EcoBoost 400
