= 2014 Sylvania 300 =

Race details
- Race 28 of 36 in the 2014 NASCAR Sprint Cup Series
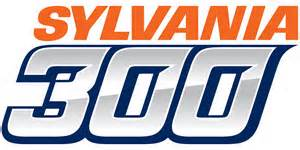
- Date: September 21, 2014
- Location: New Hampshire Motor Speedway; Loudon, New Hampshire
- Course: Permanent racing facility
- Course length: 1.058 miles (1.703 km)
- Distance: 303 laps, 320.574 mi (515.914 km)
- Scheduled distance: 300 laps, 317.4 mi (510.806 km)
- Weather: Mostly cloudy with a temperature of 73 °F (23 °C); wind out of the SSE at 10 miles per hour (16 km/h)
- Average speed: 98.697 mph (158.837 km/h)

Pole position
Driver	Brad Keselowski	Team Penske
- Time: 27.090

Most laps led
Driver	Kevin Harvick	Stewart–Haas Racing
- Laps: 104

Winner
No. 22	Joey Logano	Team Penske

Television in the United States
- Network: NASCAR on ESPN & PRN
- Announcers: Allen Bestwick, Dale Jarrett and Andy Petree (Television); Wendy Venturini and Brad Gillie (Booth); Rob Albright (Backstretch) (Radio)
- Nielsen ratings: 2.4/5 (Final); 2.2/5 (Overnight); 3.85 Million viewers

The 2014 Sylvania 300 was a NASCAR Sprint Cup Series stock car race that was held on September 21, 2014, at New Hampshire Motor Speedway in Loudon, New Hampshire. Contested over 303 laps, it was the 28th race of the 36-race 2014 NASCAR Sprint Cup Series season and second race of the ten race Chase for the Sprint Cup. Joey Logano scored his seventh career victory. Kyle Larson finished second while Kevin Harvick, Jamie McMurray, and Jimmie Johnson rounded out the top five. The top rookies of the race were Larson, Austin Dillon (11th), and Justin Allgaier (20th).

== Report ==
=== Background ===
New Hampshire Motor Speedway is a 1.058-mile (1.703-kilometre) oval speedway located in Loudon, New Hampshire which has hosted NASCAR racing annually since the early 1990s, as well as an IndyCar weekend and the oldest motorcycle race in North America, the Loudon Classic. Nicknamed "The Magic Mile", the speedway is often converted into a 1.6-mile (2.6-kilometre) road course, which includes much of the oval.

On September 16, BK Racing sidelined Ryan Truex and put Travis Kvapil in the No. 83 car. This was a decision made quietly and wasn't announced till Friday, September 19. No reason was given as to why this happened and the team has not announced the immediate future beyond this weekend. “I didn't have anything going on this weekend,” Kvapil said. “We had talked about doing something with the 93. These are my guys here. I had been with them for the last two years and feel I had a hand in building this team. I don't know what the plans are beyond this weekend, but it's good to be back.”

=== Entry list ===
The entry list for the Sylvania 300 was released on Monday, September 15, 2014 at 10:01 a.m. Eastern time. Forty-three drivers were entered for the race.

No.	Driver	Team	Manufacturer
1	Jamie McMurray	Chip Ganassi Racing	Chevrolet
2	Brad Keselowski (PC2)	Team Penske	Ford
3	Austin Dillon (R)	Richard Childress Racing	Chevrolet
4	Kevin Harvick	Stewart–Haas Racing	Chevrolet
5	Kasey Kahne	Hendrick Motorsports	Chevrolet
7	Michael Annett (R)	Tommy Baldwin Racing	Chevrolet
9	Marcos Ambrose	Richard Petty Motorsports	Ford
10	Danica Patrick	Stewart–Haas Racing	Chevrolet
11	Denny Hamlin	Joe Gibbs Racing	Toyota
13	Casey Mears	Germain Racing	Chevrolet
14	Tony Stewart (PC3)	Stewart–Haas Racing	Chevrolet
15	Clint Bowyer	Michael Waltrip Racing	Toyota
16	Greg Biffle	Roush Fenway Racing	Ford
17	Ricky Stenhouse Jr.	Roush Fenway Racing	Ford
18	Kyle Busch	Joe Gibbs Racing	Toyota
20	Matt Kenseth (PC5)	Joe Gibbs Racing	Toyota
22	Joey Logano	Team Penske	Ford
23	Alex Bowman (R)	BK Racing	Toyota
24	Jeff Gordon (PC6)	Hendrick Motorsports	Chevrolet
26	Cole Whitt (R)	BK Racing	Toyota
27	Paul Menard	Richard Childress Racing	Chevrolet
31	Ryan Newman	Richard Childress Racing	Chevrolet
32	Timmy Hill	Go FAS Racing	Ford
33	David Stremme	Hillman–Circle Sport	Chevrolet
34	David Ragan	Front Row Motorsports	Ford
36	Reed Sorenson	Tommy Baldwin Racing	Chevrolet
38	David Gilliland	Front Row Motorsports	Ford
40	Landon Cassill (i)	Hillman–Circle Sport	Chevrolet
41	Kurt Busch (PC4)	Stewart–Haas Racing	Chevrolet
42	Kyle Larson (R)	Chip Ganassi Racing	Chevrolet
43	Aric Almirola	Richard Petty Motorsports	Ford
47	A. J. Allmendinger	JTG Daugherty Racing	Chevrolet
48	Jimmie Johnson (PC1)	Hendrick Motorsports	Chevrolet
51	Justin Allgaier (R)	HScott Motorsports	Chevrolet
55	Brian Vickers	Michael Waltrip Racing	Toyota
66	Mike Wallace (i)	Identity Ventures Racing	Toyota
77	Corey Lajoie (i)	Randy Humphrey Racing	Ford
78	Martin Truex Jr.	Furniture Row Racing	Chevrolet
83	Travis Kvapil	BK Racing	Toyota
88	Dale Earnhardt Jr.	Hendrick Motorsports	Chevrolet
93	Clay Rogers	BK Racing	Toyota
98	Josh Wise	Phil Parsons Racing	Chevrolet
99	Carl Edwards	Roush Fenway Racing	Ford
Official entry list

Key	Meaning
(R)	Rookie
(i)	Ineligible for points
(PC#)	Past champions provisional

== Practice ==
=== First practice ===
Brad Keselowski was the fastest in the first practice session with a time of 27.516 and a speed of 138.421 mph (222.767 km/h).

Pos	No.	Driver	Team	Manufacturer	Time	Speed
1	2	Brad Keselowski	Team Penske	Ford	27.516	138.421
2	1	Jamie McMurray	Chip Ganassi Racing	Chevrolet	27.622	137.890
3	88	Dale Earnhardt Jr.	Hendrick Motorsports	Chevrolet	27.635	137.825
Official first practice results

== Qualifying ==
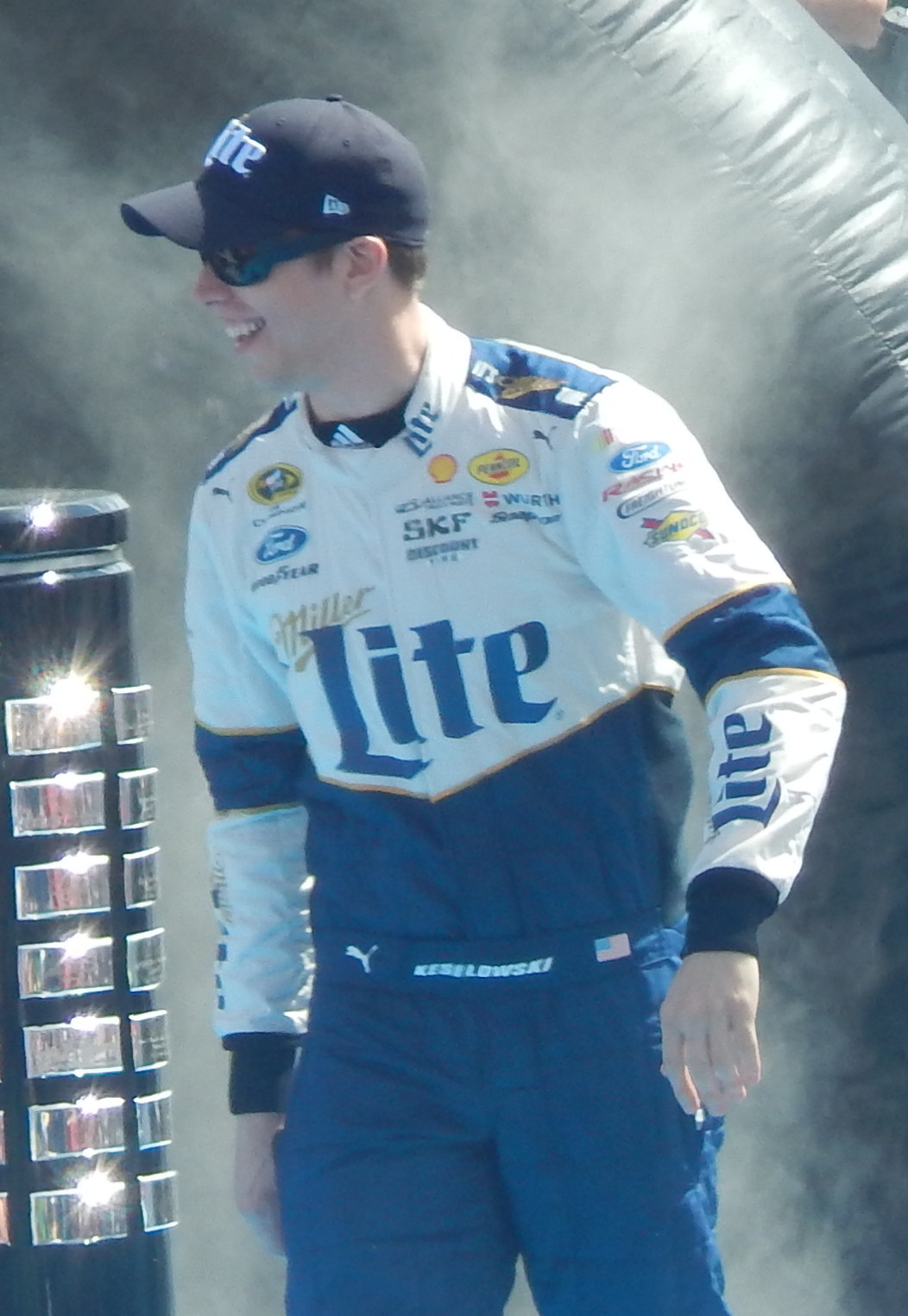
Brad Keselowski won the pole position, setting a new track record.

Brad Keselowski won the pole with a new track record time of 27.090 and a speed of 140.598 mph (226.271 km/h). “Loudon's always been one of my favorite tracks, and we’ve won a couple poles here before,” said Keselowski. “But this one is a little extra special with everything that's going on and going through the Chase and what not. I'm ready to get running tomorrow and hopefully, we'll get another win. I try not to get caught up in statements, I'm just trying to go out there and do our job. The Penske team has done phenomenal this season, and it's great to keep it rolling." “I thought we had a really good car in race trim,” said Jamie McMurray who qualified second. “We ran a few laps in race trim to start today. Very similar to the same car we had here the first race. We switched over to qualifying trim we were second quick so yeah our car has been good so far. The track will change a little bit tomorrow when the rubber gets laid down, but overall it's been a really good weekend so far.” “We qualified a lot better this time than we did the last trip here,” said Dale Earnhardt Jr. “We saved a set of tires in practice too that will be a big benefit tomorrow in race trim. It was a good day.” Forty-three drivers entered the race.

=== Qualifying results ===
Pos	No.	Driver	Team	Manufacturer	R1	R2
1	2	Brad Keselowski	Team Penske	Ford	27.281	27.090
2	1	Jamie McMurray	Chip Ganassi Racing	Chevrolet	27.377	27.121
3	4	Kevin Harvick	Stewart–Haas Racing	Chevrolet	27.342	27.193
4	11	Denny Hamlin	Joe Gibbs Racing	Toyota	27.328	27.253
5	18	Kyle Busch	Joe Gibbs Racing	Toyota	27.368	27.260
6	48	Jimmie Johnson	Hendrick Motorsports	Chevrolet	27.328	27.319
7	22	Joey Logano	Team Penske	Ford	27.345	27.354
8	99	Carl Edwards	Roush Fenway Racing	Ford	27.286	27.398
9	31	Ryan Newman	Richard Childress Racing	Chevrolet	27.403	27.412
10	42	Kyle Larson (R)	Chip Ganassi Racing	Chevrolet	27.321	27.425
11	88	Dale Earnhardt Jr.	Hendrick Motorsports	Chevrolet	27.404	27.428
12	55	Brian Vickers	Michael Waltrip Racing	Toyota	27.338	27.449
13	24	Jeff Gordon	Hendrick Motorsports	Chevrolet	27.412	—
14	15	Clint Bowyer	Michael Waltrip Racing	Toyota	27.412	—
15	41	Kurt Busch	Stewart–Haas Racing	Chevrolet	27.413	—
16	20	Matt Kenseth	Joe Gibbs Racing	Toyota	27.430	—
17	5	Kasey Kahne	Hendrick Motorsports	Chevrolet	27.436	—
18	10	Danica Patrick	Stewart–Haas Racing	Chevrolet	27.445	—
19	17	Ricky Stenhouse Jr.	Roush Fenway Racing	Ford	27.485	—
20	9	Marcos Ambrose	Richard Petty Motorsports	Ford	27.495	—
21	43	Aric Almirola	Richard Petty Motorsports	Ford	27.498	—
22	3	Austin Dillon (R)	Richard Childress Racing	Chevrolet	27.502	—
23	27	Paul Menard	Richard Childress Racing	Chevrolet	27.506	—
24	51	Justin Allgaier (R)	HScott Motorsports	Chevrolet	27.542	—
25	13	Casey Mears	Germain Racing	Chevrolet	27.558	—
26	16	Greg Biffle	Roush Fenway Racing	Ford	27.563	—
27	47	A. J. Allmendinger	JTG Daugherty Racing	Chevrolet	27.582	—
28	14	Tony Stewart	Stewart–Haas Racing	Chevrolet	27.676	—
29	34	David Ragan	Front Row Motorsports	Ford	27.684	—
30	40	Landon Cassill	Hillman–Circle Sport	Chevrolet	27.803	—
31	26	Cole Whitt (R)	BK Racing	Toyota	27.858	—
32	78	Martin Truex Jr.	Furniture Row Racing	Chevrolet	27.863	—
33	93	Clay Rogers	BK Racing	Toyota	27.891	—
34	38	David Gilliland	Front Row Motorsports	Ford	27.968	—
35	23	Alex Bowman (R)	BK Racing	Toyota	27.990	—
36	33	David Stremme	Hillman–Circle Sport	Chevrolet	27.998	—
37	36	Reed Sorenson	Tommy Baldwin Racing	Chevrolet	28.042	—
38	7	Michael Annett (R)	Tommy Baldwin Racing	Chevrolet	28.067	—
39	98	Josh Wise	Phil Parsons Racing	Chevrolet	28.162	—
40	83	Travis Kvapil	BK Racing	Toyota	28.208	—
41	77	Corey Lajoie	Randy Humphrey Racing	Ford	28.306	—
42	66	Mike Wallace	Identity Ventures Racing	Toyota	28.472	—
43	32	Timmy Hill	Go FAS Racing	Ford	28.614	—
Official qualifying results

== Practice (post-qualifying) ==
=== Second practice ===
Brad Keselowski was the fastest in the second practice session with a time of 28.084 and a speed of 135.622 mph (218.262 km/h).

Pos	No.	Driver	Team	Manufacturer	Time	Speed
1	2	Brad Keselowski	Team Penske	Ford	28.084	135.622
2	31	Ryan Newman	Richard Childress Racing	Chevrolet	28.230	134.920
3	55	Brian Vickers	Michael Waltrip Racing	Toyota	28.231	134.916
Official second practice results

=== Final practice ===
Brad Keselowski was going for the "perfect weekend" (topping the charts in every practice session along with winning the pole), but he came up short as Jeff Gordon was the fastest in the final practice session with a time of 28.139 and a speed of 135.357 mph (217.836 km/h). Corey Lajoie, who was making his first Sprint Cup Series start, tagged the wall in turn 4. Greg Biffle spun out exiting turn 2. The only damage that was sustained was a flat right-rear tire. In the closing seconds of the session, Tony Stewart got loose coming off of turn 4 and spun sideways down the front stretch.

Pos	No.	Driver	Team	Manufacturer	Time	Speed
1	24	Jeff Gordon	Hendrick Motorsports	Chevrolet	28.139	135.357
2	2	Brad Keselowski	Team Penske	Ford	28.160	135.256
3	4	Kevin Harvick	Stewart–Haas Racing	Chevrolet	28.164	135.236
Official final practice results

== Race ==
=== Start ===
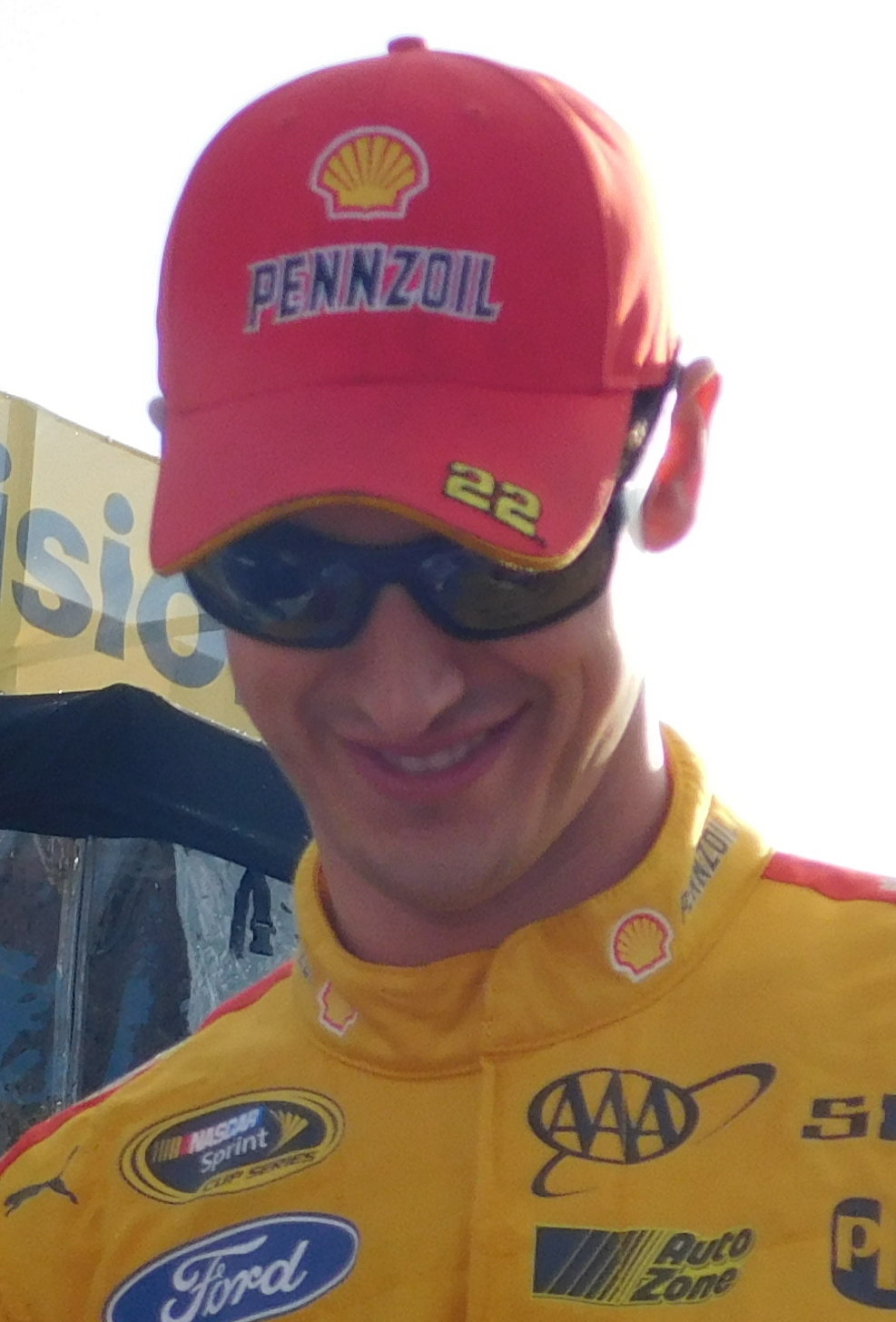
Joey Logano won the race.

The race was scheduled to start at 2:16 p.m. Eastern time but started three minutes early with Brad Keselowski leading the way, the first caution of the race flew on lap 36, It was a planned competition caution due to overnight rain. Denny Hamlin took just two tires and assumed the lead after David Gilliland pitted after staying out. Keselowski took four and exited pit road 16th, The race restarted on lap 41.

=== Second quarter ===
Kevin Harvick took the lead on lap 71, Denny Hamlin was running second when he made an unscheduled stop for a fuel probe issue on lap 95.

=== Second Caution and restart ===
Debris brought out the second caution on lap 105. The debris was from a Z-MAX decal that was located on the backstretch wall past the exit of turn 2. A NASCAR official eventually removed the logo. Harvick and Joey Logano traded the lead on pit road because of where Harvick's pit stall was located, The race restarted on lap 113, Dale Earnhardt Jr. was running sixth when he made an unscheduled stop for a loose wheel.

=== Third quarter ===
Debris in turn 3 brought out the third caution on lap 170. Harvick and Logano once again traded the lead on pit road. Only this time, Logano exited first. The race restarted on lap 178, Caution came out for the fourth time on lap 180 when Martin Truex Jr. got into Cole Whitt and spun out taking David Ragan with him. Denny Hamlin slid into Ragan trying to avoid him. "Unfortunately, in this three-race deal you can't make any mistakes," Hamlin said of the new elimination format, in which four drivers will be out of contention after every third race in the 10-race run to the title. "And we didn't. But a parts failure put us down." "I hate to say it, but maybe some guys get some trouble and let us back in it. Other than that, it's going to be hard for us to do it without some help."

=== Restart and big wreck ===
The race restarted on lap 187, Caution flew for the fifth time on lap 188 for another multi-car crash in turn 2. Matt Kenseth got loose exiting turn 2. He pancaked the front of Kyle Busch and that accordioned into Kasey Kahne and sent Busch spinning down the backstretch.

=== Fourth quarter ===
The race restarted on lap 193 and caution flew for the sixth time on lap 194 when Brad Keselowski, racing for seventh with Kenseth, got loose and turned himself around in turn 2.

=== Restart ===
The race restarted on lap 198 and caution flew for the seventh time on lap 201 after Ricky Stenhouse Jr. got turned by a loose Dale Earnhardt Jr. exiting turn 4, The race restarted on lap 206, Caution flew for the eighth time on lap 211 for debris on the backstretch. Brian Vickers stayed out when the leaders pitted and assumed the lead, The race restarted with 85 laps to go.

=== Midway ===
Caution flew for the ninth time with 79 laps to go after Kurt Busch slammed the wall in turn 3 following blowing the right-front tire.

=== Halfway ===
The race restarted with 75 laps to go, Brad Keselowski retook the lead with 73 laps to go and Debris on the backstretch brought out the tenth caution of the race with 55 laps to go, The race restarted with 50 laps to go, Caution flew for the eleventh time with 44 laps to go after Corey LaJoie spun out in turn 2.

=== Twelfth caution and restart ===
The race restarted with 40 laps to go. Ricky Stenhouse Jr. slammed the wall in turn 1 to bring out the twelfth caution of the race with 37 laps to go.

=== Restart ===
The race restarted with 32 laps to go and Kevin Harvick immediately retook the lead from Brad Keselowski. Caution came out for the 13th time with 31 laps to go after Paul Menard got loose and spun in turn 3. He collected Matt Kenseth and hit the wall in turn 4.

=== Restart and 14th caution ===
The race restarted with 27 laps to go and Joey Logano retook the lead. Caution flew for the 14th time with nine laps to go after Jeff Gordon slammed the wall in turn 1.

=== Restart and 15th caution ===
The race restarted with four laps to go. Caution flew for the 15th time with three laps to go after Tony Stewart got turned and spun exiting turn 4.

=== Green-white-checker finish ===
==== Attempt #1 ====
Joey Logano took off on the first Green-White-Checker attempt to score his fourth victory of the season. “It feels good to go into the next one,” Logano said. “We’ve got to keep doing what we're doing though. We’ve got to keep our eye on the prize and think about the big trophy at the end.”

=== Race results ===
Pos	No.	Driver	Team	Manufacturer	Laps	Points
1	22	Joey Logano	Team Penske	Ford	303	47
2	42	Kyle Larson (R)	Chip Ganassi Racing	Chevrolet	303	42
3	4	Kevin Harvick	Stewart–Haas Racing	Chevrolet	303	43
4	1	Jamie McMurray	Chip Ganassi Racing	Chevrolet	303	40
5	48	Jimmie Johnson	Hendrick Motorsports	Chevrolet	303	39
6	43	Aric Almirola	Richard Petty Motorsports	Ford	303	38
7	2	Brad Keselowski	Team Penske	Ford	303	38
8	18	Kyle Busch	Joe Gibbs Racing	Toyota	303	36
9	88	Dale Earnhardt Jr.	Hendrick Motorsports	Chevrolet	303	35
10	55	Brian Vickers	Michael Waltrip Racing	Toyota	303	35
11	3	Austin Dillon (R)	Richard Childress Racing	Chevrolet	303	33
12	78	Martin Truex Jr.	Furniture Row Racing	Chevrolet	303	32
13	47	A. J. Allmendinger	JTG Daugherty Racing	Chevrolet	303	31
14	15	Clint Bowyer	Michael Waltrip Racing	Toyota	303	30
15	27	Paul Menard	Richard Childress Racing	Chevrolet	303	29
16	16	Greg Biffle	Roush Fenway Racing	Ford	303	28
17	99	Carl Edwards	Roush Fenway Racing	Ford	303	27
18	31	Ryan Newman	Richard Childress Racing	Chevrolet	303	26
19	10	Danica Patrick	Stewart–Haas Racing	Chevrolet	303	25
20	51	Justin Allgaier (R)	HScott Motorsports	Chevrolet	303	24
21	20	Matt Kenseth	Joe Gibbs Racing	Toyota	303	23
22	13	Casey Mears	Germain Racing	Chevrolet	303	22
23	5	Kasey Kahne	Hendrick Motorsports	Chevrolet	303	21
24	9	Marcos Ambrose	Richard Petty Motorsports	Ford	303	20
25	40	Landon Cassill	Hillman–Circle Sport	Chevrolet	303	0
26	24	Jeff Gordon	Hendrick Motorsports	Chevrolet	303	18
27	38	David Gilliland	Front Row Motorsports	Ford	301	18
28	23	Alex Bowman (R)	BK Racing	Toyota	301	16
29	7	Michael Annett (R)	Tommy Baldwin Racing	Chevrolet	301	15
30	14	Tony Stewart	Stewart–Haas Racing	Chevrolet	301	14
31	36	Reed Sorenson	Tommy Baldwin Racing	Chevrolet	300	13
32	83	Travis Kvapil	BK Racing	Toyota	300	12
33	98	Josh Wise	Phil Parsons Racing	Chevrolet	297	11
34	66	Mike Wallace	Identity Ventures Racing	Toyota	296	0
35	32	Timmy Hill	Go FAS Racing	Ford	295	9
36	41	Kurt Busch	Stewart–Haas Racing	Chevrolet	268	8
37	11	Denny Hamlin	Joe Gibbs Racing	Toyota	265	8
38	26	Cole Whitt (R)	BK Racing	Toyota	264	6
39	17	Ricky Stenhouse Jr.	Roush Fenway Racing	Ford	263	5
40	33	David Stremme	Hillman–Circle Sport	Chevrolet	228	4
41	77	Corey Lajoie	Randy Humphrey Racing	Ford	201	3
42	34	David Ragan	Front Row Motorsports	Ford	177	2
43	93	Clay Rogers	BK Racing	Toyota	45	1

=== Race statistics ===
- 10 lead changes among different drivers
- 15 cautions for 63 laps
- Time of race: 3:14:53
- Joey Logano won his fourth race in 2014

== Media ==
=== Television ===
ESPN
Booth announcers	Pit reporters
Lap-by-lap: Allen Bestwick; Color-commentator: Dale Jarrett; Color commentator: Andy Petree	Jerry Punch; Dave Burns; Vince Welch; Jamie Little

=== Radio ===
PRN Radio
Booth announcers	Turn announcers	Pit reporters
Lead announcer: Wendy Venturini; Announcer: Brad Gillie	Backstretch: Rob Albright	Brett McMillan; Steve Richards; Jim Noble; Pat Patterson

== Standings after the race ==
Drivers' Championship standings

	Pos	Driver	Points
	1	Brad Keselowski	2,097
1	2	Joey Logano	2,096 (-1)
1	3	Kevin Harvick	2,090 (-7)
4	4	Jimmie Johnson	2,080 (-17)
2	5	Kyle Busch	2,077 (-20)
1	6	Dale Earnhardt Jr.	2,077 (-20)
5	7	Jeff Gordon	2,070 (-27)
2	8	Matt Kenseth	2,057 (-40)
3	9	Carl Edwards	2,057 (-40)
4	10	A. J. Allmendinger	2,056 (-41)
	11	Kasey Kahne	2,055 (-42)
1	12	Ryan Newman	2,055 (-42)
7	13	Denny Hamlin	2,049 (-48)
1	14	Greg Biffle	2,049 (-48)
6	15	Kurt Busch	2,047 (-50)
	16	Aric Almirola	2,045 (-52)

Manufacturers' Championship standings

Pos	Manufacturer	Points
1	Chevrolet	1,251
2	Ford	1,230 (-21)
3	Toyota	1,121 (-130)

- Note: Only the first sixteen positions are included for the driver standings.

Previous race: 2014 MyAFibStory.com 400	Sprint Cup Series; 2014 season	Next race: 2014 AAA 400
