= 2014 Gobowling.com 400 =

Race details
- Race 21 of 36 in the 2014 NASCAR Sprint Cup Series
- The 2014 Gobowling.com 400 program cover. The program featured an advertisement that featured a giveaway of $43,000 if Aric Almirola won.
- Date: August 3, 2014
- Location: Pocono Raceway, Long Pond, Pennsylvania
- Course: Permanent racing facility
- Course length: 2.5 miles (4.023 km)
- Distance: 160 laps, 400 mi (643.737 km)
- Weather: Mostly cloudy with chances of thunderstorms with temperatures up to 71 °F (22 °C); wind out of the southeast at 5 miles per hour (8.0 km/h)
- Average speed: 127.411 mph (205.048 km/h)

Pole position
Driver	Kyle Larson (R)	Chip Ganassi Racing
- Time: 49.063

Most laps led
Driver	Jeff Gordon	Hendrick Motorsports
- Laps: 63

Winner
No. 88	Dale Earnhardt Jr.	Hendrick Motorsports

Television in the United States
- Network: ESPN & MRN
- Announcers: Allen Bestwick, Dale Jarrett and Andy Petree (Television); Joe Moore and Jeff Striegle (Booth); Dave Moody (1), Mike Bagley (2) and Buddy Long (3) (Turns) (Radio)
- Nielsen ratings: 2.8/7 (Final); 2.6/7 (Overnight); 4.374 Million viewers

The 2014 Gobowling.com 400 was a NASCAR Sprint Cup Series stock car race that was held on August 3, 2014, at Pocono Raceway in Long Pond, Pennsylvania. Contested over 160 laps on the 2.5 miles (4.023 km) triangular superspeedway, it was the 21st race of the 2014 NASCAR Sprint Cup Series season.

Dale Earnhardt Jr. won the race, his third win of the season, completing the first season sweep of Pocono since 2006. Kevin Harvick finished second while Joey Logano, Clint Bowyer, and Greg Biffle rounded out the top five. The top rookies of the race were Kyle Larson (11th), Austin Dillon (15th), and Justin Allgaier (16th).

== Report ==
=== Background ===
Pocono Raceway, the race track where the race was held.

Pocono Raceway is a three-turn superspeedway that is 2.5 miles (4.0 km) long. The track's turns are banked differently; the first is banked at 14°, the second turn at 8° and the final turn with 6°. However, each of the three straightaways are banked at 2°. The front stretch at Pocono Raceway is 3,740 feet long, the longest at the track. The back stretch, is 3,055 feet long, while the short stretch, which connects turn two with turn three, is only 1,780 feet long. The defending race winner from 2013 is Kasey Kahne.

=== Entry list ===
The entry list for the Gobowling.com 400 was released on Monday, July 28, 2014 at 9:28 a.m. Eastern time. Forty-three drivers were entered for the race.

No.	Driver	Team	Manufacturer
1	Jamie McMurray	Chip Ganassi Racing	Chevrolet
2	Brad Keselowski (PC2)	Team Penske	Ford
3	Austin Dillon (R)	Richard Childress Racing	Chevrolet
4	Kevin Harvick	Stewart–Haas Racing	Chevrolet
5	Kasey Kahne	Hendrick Motorsports	Chevrolet
7	Michael Annett (R)	Tommy Baldwin Racing	Chevrolet
9	Marcos Ambrose	Richard Petty Motorsports	Ford
10	Danica Patrick	Stewart–Haas Racing	Chevrolet
11	Denny Hamlin	Joe Gibbs Racing	Toyota
13	Casey Mears	Germain Racing	Chevrolet
14	Tony Stewart (PC3)	Stewart–Haas Racing	Chevrolet
15	Clint Bowyer	Michael Waltrip Racing	Toyota
16	Greg Biffle	Roush Fenway Racing	Ford
17	Ricky Stenhouse Jr.	Roush Fenway Racing	Ford
18	Kyle Busch	Joe Gibbs Racing	Toyota
20	Matt Kenseth (PC5)	Joe Gibbs Racing	Toyota
22	Joey Logano	Team Penske	Ford
23	Alex Bowman (R)	BK Racing	Toyota
24	Jeff Gordon (PC6)	Hendrick Motorsports	Chevrolet
26	Cole Whitt (R)	BK Racing	Toyota
27	Paul Menard	Richard Childress Racing	Chevrolet
31	Ryan Newman	Richard Childress Racing	Chevrolet
32	Travis Kvapil	Go FAS Racing	Ford
33	Alex Kennedy	Hillman-Circle Sport LLC	Chevrolet
34	David Ragan	Front Row Motorsports	Ford
36	Reed Sorenson	Tommy Baldwin Racing	Chevrolet
37	Dave Blaney	Tommy Baldwin Racing	Chevrolet
38	David Gilliland	Front Row Motorsports	Ford
40	Landon Cassill (i)	Hillman-Circle Sport LLC	Chevrolet
41	Kurt Busch (PC4)	Stewart–Haas Racing	Chevrolet
42	Kyle Larson (R)	Chip Ganassi Racing	Chevrolet
43	Aric Almirola	Richard Petty Motorsports	Ford
47	A. J. Allmendinger	JTG Daugherty Racing	Chevrolet
48	Jimmie Johnson (PC1)	Hendrick Motorsports	Chevrolet
51	Justin Allgaier (R)	HScott Motorsports	Chevrolet
55	Brian Vickers	Michael Waltrip Racing	Toyota
66	Joe Nemechek (i)	Identity Ventures Racing	Toyota
78	Martin Truex Jr.	Furniture Row Racing	Chevrolet
83	Ryan Truex (R)	BK Racing	Toyota
88	Dale Earnhardt Jr.	Hendrick Motorsports	Chevrolet
93	Johnny Sauter (i)	BK Racing	Toyota
98	Josh Wise	Phil Parsons Racing	Chevrolet
99	Carl Edwards	Roush Fenway Racing	Ford
Official entry list

Key	Meaning
(R)	Rookie
(i)	Ineligible for points
(PC#)	Past champions provisional

== Practice ==
=== First practice ===
Kurt Busch was the fastest in the first practice session with a time of 49.902 and a speed of 180.353 mph (290.250 km/h).

Pos	No.	Driver	Team	Manufacturer	Time	Speed
1	41	Kurt Busch	Stewart–Haas Racing	Chevrolet	49.902	180.353
2	2	Brad Keselowski	Team Penske	Ford	49.957	180.155
3	22	Joey Logano	Team Penske	Ford	50.058	179.791
Official first practice results

== Qualifying ==
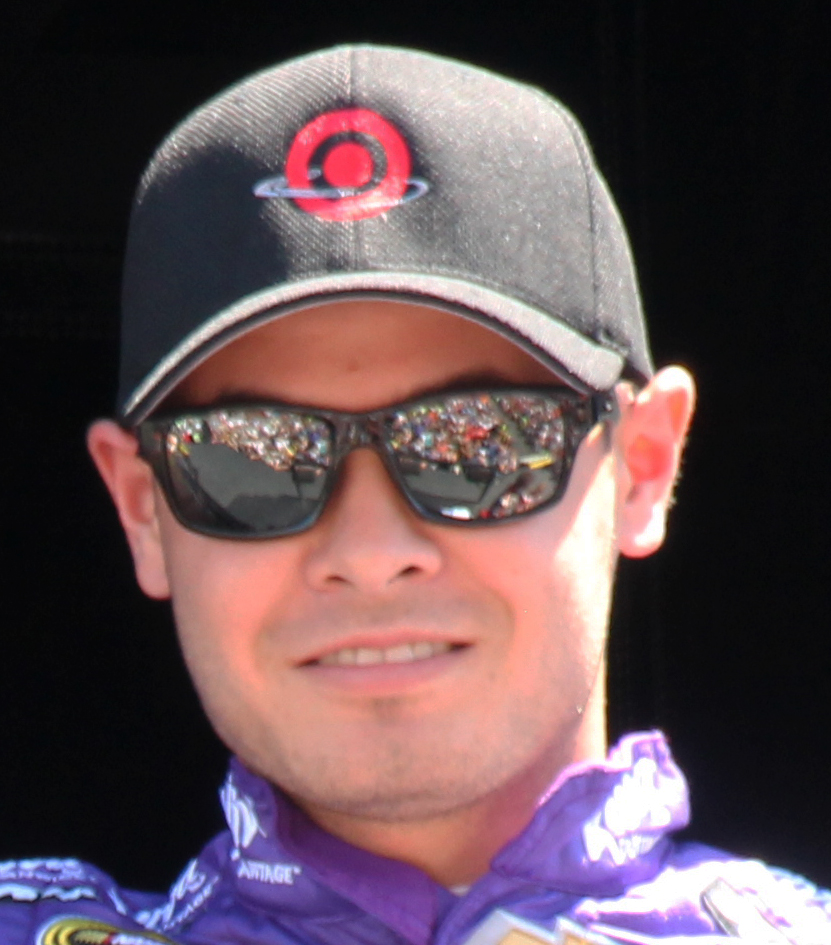
Kyle Larson won the pole position, setting a new track record.

Rookie Kyle Larson won the pole, his first at Sprint Cup level, with a new track record lap time of 49.063 and a speed of 183.438 mph (295.215 km/h). Larson reflected on recent extensive running at the circuit, in testing and also racing in other events – ARCA and the Camping World Truck Series – since the previous Cup race in June, stating that "for whatever reason I feel like I've adapted pretty well to this track even though it's not a track where you maneuver around and can move from the bottom to the top". Joey Logano qualified alongside Larson on the front row, praising his performance and stating that he "liked tough race tracks and this is one of them". Logano had felt that Kurt Busch had been favorite for pole position, but also commented on Larson's performance, stating "Kyle definitely laid down a good one because I thought my lap was (darn) near perfect and then I got beat, so it's a little frustrating, but, overall, it's a good starting spot".

=== Qualifying results ===
Pos	No.	Driver	Team	Manufacturer	R1	R2	R3
1	42	Kyle Larson (R)	Chip Ganassi Racing	Chevrolet	49.669	49.429	49.063
2	22	Joey Logano	Team Penske	Ford	49.505	49.364	49.071
3	2	Brad Keselowski	Team Penske	Ford	49.694	49.851	49.261
4	41	Kurt Busch	Stewart–Haas Racing	Chevrolet	49.538	49.459	49.272
5	24	Jeff Gordon	Hendrick Motorsports	Chevrolet	49.695	49.568	49.285
6	4	Kevin Harvick	Stewart–Haas Racing	Chevrolet	49.638	49.571	49.426
7	18	Kyle Busch	Joe Gibbs Racing	Toyota	49.774	49.549	49.445
8	1	Jamie McMurray	Chip Ganassi Racing	Chevrolet	49.892	49.580	49.446
9	88	Dale Earnhardt Jr.	Hendrick Motorsports	Chevrolet	49.754	49.629	49.521
10	10	Danica Patrick	Stewart–Haas Racing	Chevrolet	49.722	49.635	49.547
11	3	Austin Dillon (R)	Richard Childress Racing	Chevrolet	50.125	49.625	49.558
12	5	Kasey Kahne	Hendrick Motorsports	Chevrolet	49.585	49.571	49.647
13	11	Denny Hamlin	Joe Gibbs Racing	Toyota	49.915	49.680	—
14	15	Clint Bowyer	Michael Waltrip Racing	Toyota	49.929	49.681	—
15	55	Brian Vickers	Michael Waltrip Racing	Toyota	50.005	49.765	—
16	14	Tony Stewart	Stewart–Haas Racing	Chevrolet	49.757	49.802	—
17	48	Jimmie Johnson	Hendrick Motorsports	Chevrolet	50.224	49.861	—
18	20	Matt Kenseth	Joe Gibbs Racing	Toyota	50.001	49.924	—
19	78	Martin Truex Jr.	Furniture Row Racing	Chevrolet	50.070	49.963	—
20	47	A. J. Allmendinger	JTG Daugherty Racing	Chevrolet	50.112	50.004	—
21	31	Ryan Newman	Richard Childress Racing	Chevrolet	50.104	50.034	—
22	51	Justin Allgaier (R)	HScott Motorsports	Chevrolet	49.921	50.164	—
23	17	Ricky Stenhouse Jr.	Roush Fenway Racing	Ford	50.220	50.194	—
24	13	Casey Mears	Germain Racing	Chevrolet	50.123	50.260	—
25	16	Greg Biffle	Roush Fenway Racing	Ford	50.232	—	—
26	99	Carl Edwards	Roush Fenway Racing	Ford	50.280	—	—
27	9	Marcos Ambrose	Richard Petty Motorsports	Ford	50.303	—	—
28	43	Aric Almirola	Richard Petty Motorsports	Ford	50.304	—	—
29	27	Paul Menard	Richard Childress Racing	Chevrolet	50.318	—	—
30	38	David Gilliland	Front Row Motorsports	Ford	50.548	—	—
31	98	Josh Wise	Phil Parsons Racing	Chevrolet	50.646	—	—
32	40	Landon Cassill	Hillman-Circle Sport LLC	Chevrolet	50.654	—	—
33	26	Cole Whitt (R)	BK Racing	Toyota	50.687	—	—
34	32	Travis Kvapil	Go FAS Racing	Ford	50.733	—	—
35	36	Reed Sorenson	Tommy Baldwin Racing	Chevrolet	50.746	—	—
36	23	Alex Bowman (R)	BK Racing	Toyota	50.991	—	—
37	83	Ryan Truex (R)	BK Racing	Toyota	51.012	—	—
38	7	Michael Annett (R)	Tommy Baldwin Racing	Chevrolet	51.017	—	—
39	34	David Ragan	Front Row Motorsports	Ford	51.109	—	—
40	37	Dave Blaney	Tommy Baldwin Racing	Chevrolet	51.487	—	—
41	66	Joe Nemechek	Identity Ventures Racing	Toyota	52.239	—	—
42	33	Alex Kennedy	Hillman-Circle Sport LLC	Chevrolet	52.265	—	—
43	93	Johnny Sauter	BK Racing	Toyota	54.164	—	—
Official qualifying results

== Practice (post-qualifying) ==
=== Second practice ===
Kurt Busch was the fastest in the second practice session with a time of 50.319 and a speed of 178.859 mph (287.846 km/h).

Pos	No.	Driver	Team	Manufacturer	Time	Speed
1	41	Kurt Busch	Stewart–Haas Racing	Chevrolet	50.319	178.859
2	31	Ryan Newman	Richard Childress Racing	Chevrolet	50.440	178.430
3	2	Brad Keselowski	Team Penske	Ford	50.449	178.398
Official second practice results

=== Final practice ===
Brad Keselowski was the fastest in the final practice session with a time of 50.407 and a speed of 178.547 mph (287.344 km/h).

Pos	No.	Driver	Team	Manufacturer	Time	Speed
1	2	Brad Keselowski	Team Penske	Ford	50.407	178.547
2	24	Jeff Gordon	Hendrick Motorsports	Chevrolet	50.410	178.536
3	18	Kyle Busch	Joe Gibbs Racing	Toyota	50.492	178.246
Official final practice results

== Race ==
=== First half ===
==== Start ====
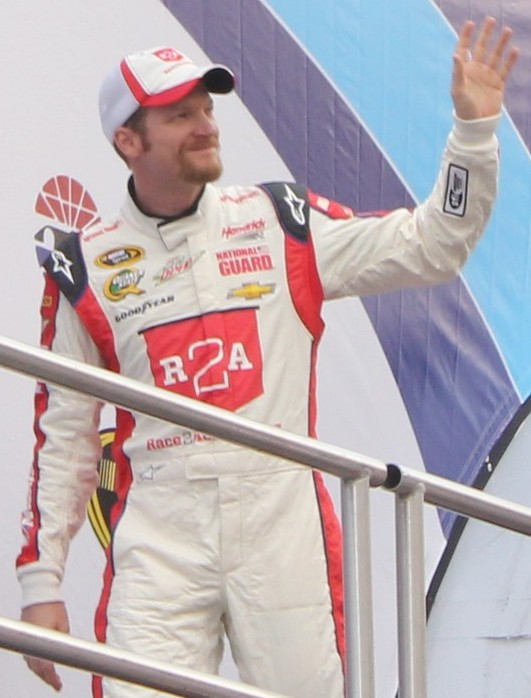
Dale Earnhardt Jr. won the race.

The race was originally scheduled to start at 1:18 P.M. EDT, but with the threat of thunderstorms in the forecast, NASCAR moved the start of the race up by around 10 minutes, with rookie Kyle Larson leading the field. At the second turn of the first lap, Brad Keselowski made contact with Kurt Busch and almost spun out, but saved his car and dropped back to 12th, while Joey Logano took the lead from Larson. Jimmie Johnson's car suffered a cut tire and made contact with the wall on the front stretch on lap eight, bringing out a debris caution a lap later. Logano led the field to the restart on lap 13. On lap 15, Danica Patrick brushed the wall on the exit of turn 2, and after a tire blowout, she hit the same wall the following lap, to bring out the second caution. As the first driver who was a lap down in the field, Johnson was the recipient of the free pass, allowing him to return to the lead lap.

Logano continued to lead as the race resumed on lap 20. On lap 23, Kyle Busch's day ended early with a blown engine; he described the problem as "something between the frame rails doesn't seem to operate correctly right now" to reporters after he had exited the car. He also expressed his disappointment about having to exit the race so early: "It's unfortunate, I thought we had a good car today. Our car has been good this weekend in practices and stuff like that. Obviously you hope for better days, and this M&M's Camry team deserves better days but this ain't one of them". The third caution flag came out on lap 29 when Landon Cassill hit the wall in the same position as Patrick had done so, previously; Patrick profited from the free pass at the caution. Brian Vickers won the race off pit road but Kurt Busch, and eight other cars, stayed out when the leaders came in to pit and assumed the lead for the restart, on lap 34.

Busch's different pit cycle saw him onto pit road ten laps later, at which point Jeff Gordon took the lead. On lap 51, the fourth caution flag came out when Joe Nemechek got turned loose by Kasey Kahne and hit the wall in turn 3. The race restarted on lap 56, with Gordon holding the lead until his next pit stop, on lap 65, returning the lead to Busch. Busch pitted on lap 75, giving the lead to A. J. Allmendinger. Allmendinger made his stop on lap 77, at which point Aric Almirola and David Gilliland each led a lap before making green flag pit stops, while Gordon reclaimed the lead. On lap 84, Gordon officially became the first driver in track history to lead over 1,000 laps. He led until his next green flag pit stop on lap 95 and gave the lead to Kevin Harvick. Harvick made his stop on lap 96 and gave the lead back to Busch. Harvick dropped to the tail end of the field as he was caught speeding on pit road. Busch hit pit road on lap 103 and handed the lead to Matt Kenseth. Kenseth led for three laps before returning the lead back to Gordon.

=== Second half ===
The fifth caution came out on lap 112, when Johnson – after going a lap down early in the race and getting up as high as fifth – hit the wall in turn 2. He described his incidents as "I got tight off Turn 1 off the fence" for his first scrape with the wall, and later deemed himself "clueless" at the second hit, stating that "It didn't act like a tire went down. It just went straight. Hopefully we can get a reason why".

==== The Big One ====
The race restarted on lap 117, but before the end of the first complete lap after the restart, the sixth caution flag came out for a large crash involving 13 cars on the Long Pond Straightaway. It started when Denny Hamlin got sucked around by air off of Clint Bowyer's car in an outside line of cars and started to spin out. Hamlin saved his car, but Brian Vickers collided with Matt Kenseth while checking up to avoid Hamlin, and collected Aric Almirola, Allmendinger, Brad Keselowski, Paul Menard, Tony Stewart, Justin Allgaier, Harvick, Michael Annett, Martin Truex Jr. and Ricky Stenhouse Jr. While Harvick, Allgaier, and a couple of others continued, many of the cars involved were knocked out of the race; Harvick would later manage to pick his way through to a second-place finish. There were only 15 cars on the lead lap before the restart. Hamlin referred to his part in the incident as being "stuck three-wide" and that he was "sucked around" when Bowyer was passing him. Kenseth expressed his frustration at being involved in the crash, stating that his car had "been in all the big wrecks this year", and that "it seems like you're always in the wrong place at the wrong time".

While under caution – on lap 119 – Gordon achieved his 24,000th career lap led, and led the field to the restart on lap 127. Gordon made his final stop and handed the lead to Harvick on lap 132, before Greg Biffle took the lead four laps later. On lap 139, the seventh caution came out when Allmendinger, laps down with damage from the lap 117 crash, hit the wall in turn 1. The race restarted with 17 laps to go.

==== Final laps ====
On lap 147, Dale Earnhardt Jr. passed Biffle for the lead, and had managed to build up a 3.5 second lead on Harvick by lap 153, when it was erased after the eighth caution of the race came out, after Busch hit the wall exiting turn 2. The final restart came with three laps remaining, with Earnhardt Jr. restarting on the prevailing outside lane. He assumed the lead, with Harvick running about a car length behind and Logano just behind them. Earnhardt held off the chasers for the last three laps to win the race, completing the first Pocono sweep since Hamlin in 2006. Earnhardt Jr. reflected on the sweep, stating that his team "definitely went home from the last race and made our car better" and that's what I'm proud of this team for". He also praised the strategy of his crew chief, Steve Letarte. Harvick was impressed with his car's speed in both Pocono races, and that his team "were able to capitalize on it and get a good finish".

=== Race results ===
Pos	No.	Driver	Team	Manufacturer	Laps	Points
1	88	Dale Earnhardt Jr.	Hendrick Motorsports	Chevrolet	160	47
2	4	Kevin Harvick	Stewart–Haas Racing	Chevrolet	160	43
3	22	Joey Logano	Team Penske	Ford	160	42
4	15	Clint Bowyer	Michael Waltrip Racing	Toyota	160	40
5	16	Greg Biffle	Roush Fenway Racing	Ford	160	40
6	24	Jeff Gordon	Hendrick Motorsports	Chevrolet	160	40
7	1	Jamie McMurray	Chip Ganassi Racing	Chevrolet	160	37
8	31	Ryan Newman	Richard Childress Racing	Chevrolet	160	36
9	11	Denny Hamlin	Joe Gibbs Racing	Toyota	160	35
10	5	Kasey Kahne	Hendrick Motorsports	Chevrolet	160	34
11	42	Kyle Larson (R)	Chip Ganassi Racing	Chevrolet	160	33
12	13	Casey Mears	Germain Racing	Ford	160	32
13	41	Kurt Busch	Stewart–Haas Racing	Chevrolet	160	32
14	9	Marcos Ambrose	Richard Petty Motorsports	Ford	160	30
15	3	Austin Dillon (R)	Richard Childress Racing	Chevrolet	160	29
16	51	Justin Allgaier (R)	HScott Motorsports	Chevrolet	160	28
17	38	David Gilliland	Front Row Motorsports	Ford	160	28
18	17	Ricky Stenhouse Jr.	Roush Fenway Racing	Ford	159	26
19	34	David Ragan	Front Row Motorsports	Ford	159	25
20	83	Ryan Truex (R)	BK Racing	Toyota	159	24
21	26	Cole Whitt (R)	BK Racing	Toyota	159	23
22	7	Michael Annett (R)	Tommy Baldwin Racing	Ford	159	22
23	2	Brad Keselowski	Team Penske	Ford	159	21
24	98	Josh Wise	Phil Parsons Racing	Chevrolet	159	20
25	32	Travis Kvapil	Go FAS Racing	Ford	158	19
26	37	Dave Blaney	Tommy Baldwin Racing	Chevrolet	158	18
27	36	Reed Sorenson	Tommy Baldwin Racing	Chevrolet	158	17
28	33	Alex Kennedy	Hillman-Circle Sport LLC	Chevrolet	158	16
29	99	Carl Edwards	Roush Fenway Racing	Ford	157	15
30	10	Danica Patrick	Stewart–Haas Racing	Chevrolet	156	14
31	23	Alex Bowman (R)	BK Racing	Toyota	154	13
32	78	Martin Truex Jr.	Furniture Row Racing	Chevrolet	144	12
33	27	Paul Menard	Richard Childress Racing	Chevrolet	143	11
34	47	A. J. Allmendinger	JTG Daugherty Racing	Chevrolet	137	11
35	43	Aric Almirola	Richard Petty Motorsports	Ford	125	10
36	14	Tony Stewart	Stewart–Haas Racing	Chevrolet	124	8
37	55	Brian Vickers	Michael Waltrip Racing	Toyota	116	7
38	20	Matt Kenseth	Joe Gibbs Racing	Toyota	116	7
39	48	Jimmie Johnson	Hendrick Motorsports	Chevrolet	111	5
40	66	Joe Nemechek	Identity Ventures Racing	Toyota	88	0
41	40	Landon Cassill	Hillman-Circle Sport LLC	Chevrolet	28	0
42	18	Kyle Busch	Joe Gibbs Racing	Toyota	23	2
43	93	Johnny Sauter	BK Racing	Toyota	11	0

=== Race summary ===
- Lead changes: 15
- Cautions: 8 for 35 laps
- Red flags: 0
- Time of race: 3 hours, 8 minutes and 22 seconds
- Average speed: 127.411 miles per hour (205.048 km/h)

== Media ==
=== Television ===
ESPN
Booth announcers	Pit reporters
Lap-by-lap: Allen Bestwick; Color-commentator: Dale Jarrett; Color commentator: Andy Petree	Jerry Punch; Dave Burns; Vince Welch; Jamie Little

=== Radio ===
MRN Radio
Booth announcers	Turn announcers	Pit reporters
Lead announcer: Joe Moore; Announcer: Jeff Striegle	Turn 1: Dave Moody; Turn 2: Mike Bagley; Turn 3: Buddy Long	Winston Kelly; Steve Post; Alex Hayden; Woody Cain

== Standings after the race ==
Drivers' Championship standings

	Pos	Driver	Points
	1	Jeff Gordon	757
	2	Dale Earnhardt Jr.	740 (−17)
	3	Brad Keselowski	687 (−70)
	4	Matt Kenseth	668 (−89)
2	5	Ryan Newman	642 (−115)
1	6	Jimmie Johnson	633 (−124)
2	7	Joey Logano	633 (−124)
	8	Carl Edwards	618 (−139)
1	9	Clint Bowyer	617 (−140)
4	10	Kyle Busch	611 (−146)
	11	Kevin Harvick	608 (−149)
	12	Kyle Larson (R)	595 (−162)
3	13	Greg Biffle	590 (−167)
	14	Kasey Kahne	589 (−168)
2	15	Austin Dillon (R)	588 (−169)
1	16	Paul Menard	562 (−195)

Manufacturers' Championship standings

Pos	Manufacturer	Points
1	Chevrolet	942
2	Ford	916 (−26)
3	Toyota	848 (−94)

- Note: Only the first sixteen positions are included for the driver standings.

Previous race: 2014 Brickyard 400	Sprint Cup Series; 2014 season	Next race: 2014 Cheez-It 355 at The Glen
