= 2014 AAA 400 =

Race details
- Race 29 of 36 in the 2014 NASCAR Sprint Cup Series
- Layout of Dover International Speedway
- Date: September 28, 2014
- Location: Dover International Speedway in Dover, Delaware
- Course: Permanent racing facility
- Course length: 1 miles (1.6 km)
- Distance: 400 laps, 400 mi (643.737 km)
- Weather: Mostly sunny with a temperature of 76 °F (24 °C); wind out of the southeast at 5 miles per hour (8.0 km/h)
- Average speed: 130.541 mph (210.085 km/h)

Pole position
| Driver | Kevin Harvick | Stewart–Haas Racing |
- Time: 22.095

Most laps led
| Driver | Kevin Harvick | Stewart–Haas Racing |
- Laps: 223

Winner
| No. 24 | Jeff Gordon | Hendrick Motorsports |

Television in the United States
- Network: ESPN & MRN
- Announcers: Allen Bestwick, Dale Jarrett and Andy Petree (Television); Joe Moore and Jeff Striegle (Booth); Mike Bagley (Backstretch) (Radio)
- Nielsen ratings: 2.3/5 (Final); 2.1/5 (Overnight); 3.786 Million viewers

The 2014 AAA 400 was a NASCAR Sprint Cup Series race that was held on September 28, 2014, at Dover International Speedway in Dover, Delaware. Contested over 400 laps, it was the 29th race of the 36 race 2014 Sprint Cup Series championship, and the third race in the Chase for the Sprint Cup. Jeff Gordon won the race, his fourth win of the season and first at Dover since 2001. Brad Keselowski finished second while Jimmie Johnson, Joey Logano and Matt Kenseth rounded out the top five. The top rookies of the race were Kyle Larson (6th), Austin Dillon (24th), and Justin Allgaier (29th).

== Report ==
=== Background ===
The track, Dover International Speedway, is a four-turn short track oval that is 1 mile (1.6 km) long. The track's turns are banked at twenty-four degrees. The front stretch, the location of the finish line, is banked at nine degrees with the backstretch. The racetrack has seats for 113,000 spectators. Jimmie Johnson was the defending race winner from 2013.

Despite his name being on the entry list for this weekend's race, Ryan Truex was released from BK Racing on September 23. Sources within the team stated the change stemmed from unhappiness with the amount of feedback from the rookie driver. Travis Kvapil is expected to drive the car for the rest of the season.

=== Entry list ===
The entry list for the AAA 400 was released on Monday, September 22, 2014, at 8:48 a.m. Eastern time. Forty-three drivers were entered for the race.

| No. | Driver | Team | Manufacturer |
|---|---|---|---|
| 1 | Jamie McMurray | Chip Ganassi Racing | Chevrolet |
| 2 | Brad Keselowski (PC2) | Team Penske | Ford |
| 3 | Austin Dillon (R) | Richard Childress Racing | Chevrolet |
| 4 | Kevin Harvick | Stewart–Haas Racing | Chevrolet |
| 5 | Kasey Kahne | Hendrick Motorsports | Chevrolet |
| 7 | Michael Annett (R) | Tommy Baldwin Racing | Chevrolet |
| 9 | Marcos Ambrose | Richard Petty Motorsports | Ford |
| 10 | Danica Patrick | Stewart–Haas Racing | Chevrolet |
| 11 | Denny Hamlin | Joe Gibbs Racing | Toyota |
| 13 | Casey Mears | Germain Racing | Chevrolet |
| 14 | Tony Stewart (PC3) | Stewart–Haas Racing | Chevrolet |
| 15 | Clint Bowyer | Michael Waltrip Racing | Toyota |
| 16 | Greg Biffle | Roush Fenway Racing | Ford |
| 17 | Ricky Stenhouse Jr. | Roush Fenway Racing | Ford |
| 18 | Kyle Busch | Joe Gibbs Racing | Toyota |
| 20 | Matt Kenseth (PC5) | Joe Gibbs Racing | Toyota |
| 22 | Joey Logano | Team Penske | Ford |
| 23 | Alex Bowman (R) | BK Racing | Toyota |
| 24 | Jeff Gordon (PC6) | Hendrick Motorsports | Chevrolet |
| 26 | Cole Whitt (R) | BK Racing | Toyota |
| 27 | Paul Menard | Richard Childress Racing | Chevrolet |
| 31 | Ryan Newman | Richard Childress Racing | Chevrolet |
| 32 | J. J. Yeley (i) | Go FAS Racing | Ford |
| 33 | David Stremme | Hillman–Circle Sport | Chevrolet |
| 34 | David Ragan | Front Row Motorsports | Ford |
| 36 | Reed Sorenson | Tommy Baldwin Racing | Chevrolet |
| 37 | Mike Bliss (i) | Tommy Baldwin Racing | Chevrolet |
| 38 | David Gilliland | Front Row Motorsports | Ford |
| 40 | Landon Cassill (i) | Hillman–Circle Sport | Chevrolet |
| 41 | Kurt Busch (PC4) | Stewart–Haas Racing | Chevrolet |
| 42 | Kyle Larson (R) | Chip Ganassi Racing | Chevrolet |
| 43 | Aric Almirola | Richard Petty Motorsports | Ford |
| 44 | Timmy Hill | Team XTREME Racing | Chevrolet |
| 47 | A. J. Allmendinger | JTG Daugherty Racing | Chevrolet |
| 48 | Jimmie Johnson (PC1) | Hendrick Motorsports | Chevrolet |
| 51 | Justin Allgaier (R) | HScott Motorsports | Chevrolet |
| 55 | Brian Vickers | Michael Waltrip Racing | Toyota |
| 66 | Mike Wallace (i) | Identity Ventures Racing | Toyota |
| 78 | Martin Truex Jr. | Furniture Row Racing | Chevrolet |
| 83 | Travis Kvapil | BK Racing | Toyota |
| 88 | Dale Earnhardt Jr. | Hendrick Motorsports | Chevrolet |
| 98 | Josh Wise | Phil Parsons Racing | Chevrolet |
| 99 | Carl Edwards | Roush Fenway Racing | Ford |
Official entry list

| Key | Meaning |
|---|---|
| (R) | Rookie |
| (i) | Ineligible for points |
| (PC#) | Past champions provisional |

== Practice ==
=== First practice ===
Kevin Harvick was the fastest in the first practice session with a time of 21.971 and a speed of 163.852 mph (263.694 km/h). Landon Cassill blew an engine in the first practice session.

| Pos | No. | Driver | Team | Manufacturer | Time | Speed |
|---|---|---|---|---|---|---|
| 1 | 4 | Kevin Harvick | Stewart–Haas Racing | Chevrolet | 21.971 | 163.852 |
| 2 | 2 | Brad Keselowski | Team Penske | Ford | 21.988 | 163.726 |
| 3 | 24 | Jeff Gordon | Hendrick Motorsports | Chevrolet | 22.010 | 163.562 |
Official first practice results

== Qualifying ==
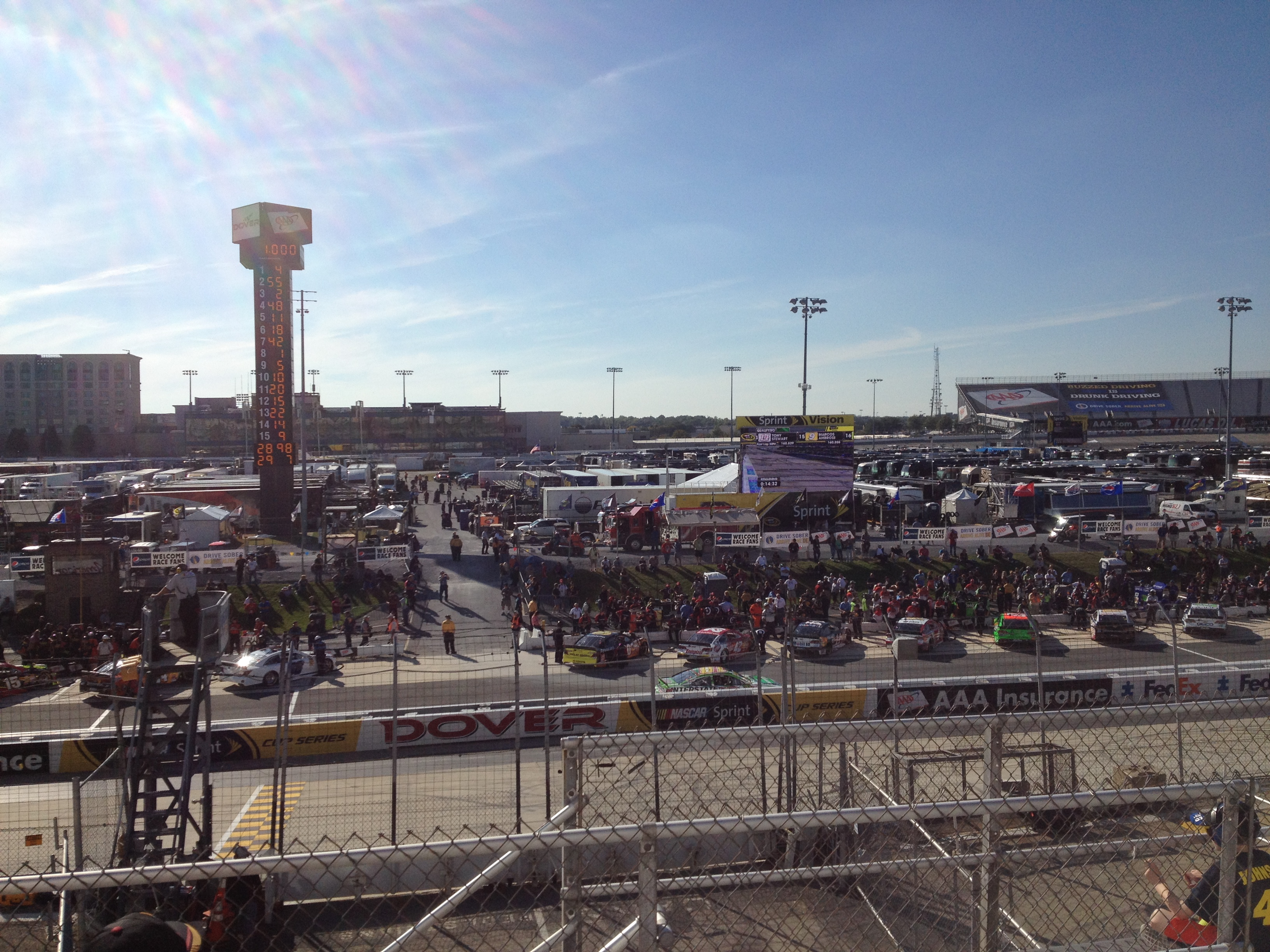
Qualifying for the race

Harvick won the pole with a time of 22.095 and a speed of 162.933 mph (262.215 km/h). "It’s been an amazing year for everybody," Harvick said of his team. "They do a great job in preparing the racecars and put a lot of effort into qualifying, and it’s translated into a lot of good finishes." "This is the most important race of my career," Hamlin said. "This is the most important race now because it's in the present. If we’re going to live to race another day, we’ve got to get past this weekend. If not, we become somewhat irrelevant." Forty-three cars were entered so no one failed to qualify.

=== Qualifying results ===
| Pos | No. | Driver | Team | Manufacturer | R1 | R2 |
|---|---|---|---|---|---|---|
| 1 | 4 | Kevin Harvick | Stewart–Haas Racing | Chevrolet | 22.129 | 22.095 |
| 2 | 18 | Kyle Busch | Joe Gibbs Racing | Toyota | 22.278 | 22.167 |
| 3 | 11 | Denny Hamlin | Joe Gibbs Racing | Toyota | 22.266 | 22.188 |
| 4 | 2 | Brad Keselowski | Team Penske | Ford | 22.220 | 22.203 |
| 5 | 1 | Jamie McMurray | Chip Ganassi Racing | Chevrolet | 22.314 | 22.231 |
| 6 | 24 | Jeff Gordon | Hendrick Motorsports | Chevrolet | 22.248 | 22.281 |
| 7 | 42 | Kyle Larson (R) | Chip Ganassi Racing | Chevrolet | 22.295 | 22.297 |
| 8 | 48 | Jimmie Johnson | Hendrick Motorsports | Chevrolet | 22.250 | 22.319 |
| 9 | 15 | Clint Bowyer | Michael Waltrip Racing | Toyota | 22.317 | 22.410 |
| 10 | 3 | Austin Dillon (R) | Richard Childress Racing | Chevrolet | 22.331 | 22.429 |
| 11 | 55 | Brian Vickers | Michael Waltrip Racing | Toyota | 22.183 | 22.431 |
| 12 | 5 | Kasey Kahne | Hendrick Motorsports | Chevrolet | 22.321 | 22.473 |
| 13 | 10 | Danica Patrick | Stewart–Haas Racing | Chevrolet | 22.333 | — |
| 14 | 20 | Matt Kenseth | Joe Gibbs Racing | Toyota | 22.342 | — |
| 15 | 14 | Tony Stewart | Stewart–Haas Racing | Chevrolet | 22.358 | — |
| 16 | 22 | Joey Logano | Team Penske | Ford | 22.377 | — |
| 17 | 9 | Marcos Ambrose | Richard Petty Motorsports | Ford | 22.387 | — |
| 18 | 99 | Carl Edwards | Roush Fenway Racing | Ford | 22.401 | — |
| 19 | 27 | Paul Menard | Richard Childress Racing | Chevrolet | 22.411 | — |
| 20 | 31 | Ryan Newman | Richard Childress Racing | Chevrolet | 22.413 | — |
| 21 | 43 | Aric Almirola | Richard Petty Motorsports | Ford | 22.418 | — |
| 22 | 41 | Kurt Busch | Stewart–Haas Racing | Chevrolet | 22.426 | — |
| 23 | 51 | Justin Allgaier (R) | HScott Motorsports | Chevrolet | 22.437 | — |
| 24 | 17 | Ricky Stenhouse Jr. | Roush Fenway Racing | Ford | 22.441 | — |
| 25 | 88 | Dale Earnhardt Jr. | Hendrick Motorsports | Chevrolet | 22.444 | — |
| 26 | 78 | Martin Truex Jr. | Furniture Row Racing | Chevrolet | 22.480 | — |
| 27 | 16 | Greg Biffle | Roush Fenway Racing | Ford | 22.510 | — |
| 28 | 47 | A. J. Allmendinger | JTG Daugherty Racing | Chevrolet | 22.519 | — |
| 29 | 26 | Cole Whitt (R) | BK Racing | Toyota | 22.540 | — |
| 30 | 13 | Casey Mears | Germain Racing | Chevrolet | 22.613 | — |
| 31 | 38 | David Gilliland | Front Row Motorsports | Ford | 22.624 | — |
| 32 | 98 | Josh Wise | Phil Parsons Racing | Chevrolet | 22.749 | — |
| 33 | 36 | Reed Sorenson | Tommy Baldwin Racing | Chevrolet | 22.760 | — |
| 34 | 23 | Alex Bowman (R) | BK Racing | Toyota | 22.772 | — |
| 35 | 7 | Michael Annett (R) | Tommy Baldwin Racing | Chevrolet | 22.789 | — |
| 36 | 40 | Landon Cassill | Hillman–Circle Sport | Chevrolet | 22.910 | — |
| 37 | 34 | David Ragan | Front Row Motorsports | Ford | 22.922 | — |
| 38 | 33 | David Stremme | Hillman–Circle Sport | Chevrolet | 23.024 | — |
| 39 | 32 | J. J. Yeley | Go FAS Racing | Ford | 23.052 | — |
| 40 | 37 | Mike Bliss | Tommy Baldwin Racing | Chevrolet | 23.071 | — |
| 41 | 66 | Mike Wallace | Identity Ventures Racing | Toyota | 23.074 | — |
| 42 | 83 | Travis Kvapil | BK Racing | Toyota | 23.456 | — |
| 43 | 44 | Timmy Hill | Team XTREME Racing | Chevrolet | 23.629 | — |
Official qualifying results

== Practice (post-qualifying) ==
=== Second practice ===
Matt Kenseth was the fastest in the second practice session with a time of 23.129 and a speed of 155.649 mph (250.493 km/h).

| Pos | No. | Driver | Team | Manufacturer | Time | Speed |
|---|---|---|---|---|---|---|
| 1 | 20 | Matt Kenseth | Joe Gibbs Racing | Toyota | 23.129 | 155.649 |
| 2 | 47 | A. J. Allmendinger | JTG Daugherty Racing | Chevrolet | 23.255 | 154.805 |
| 3 | 11 | Denny Hamlin | Joe Gibbs Racing | Toyota | 23.405 | 153.813 |
Official second practice results

=== Final practice ===
Kevin Harvick was the fastest in the final practice session with a time of 22.917 and a speed of 157.089 mph (252.810 km/h).

| Pos | No. | Driver | Team | Manufacturer | Time | Speed |
|---|---|---|---|---|---|---|
| 1 | 4 | Kevin Harvick | Stewart–Haas Racing | Chevrolet | 22.917 | 157.089 |
| 2 | 2 | Brad Keselowski | Team Penske | Ford | 23.021 | 156.379 |
| 3 | 24 | Jeff Gordon | Hendrick Motorsports | Chevrolet | 23.084 | 155.952 |
Official final practice results

== Race ==
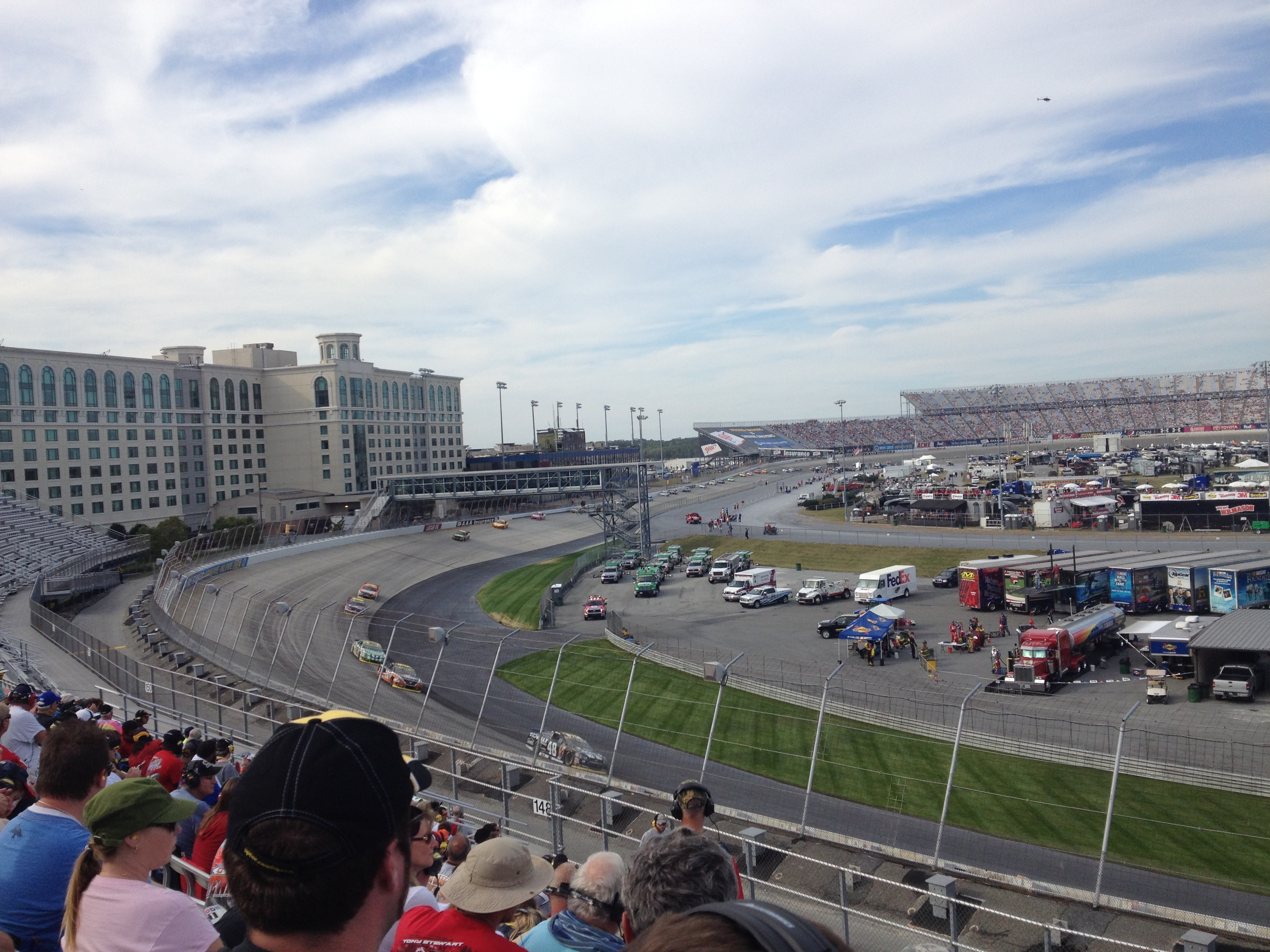
The race viewed from turn 3

The race was scheduled to begin at 2:15 p.m. Eastern time but started at 2:19 p.m. when Kevin Harvick led the field to the green. Debris in turn four brought out the first caution of the race on lap 62. The race restarted on lap 68. Caution flew for the second time on lap 75 after Ricky Stenhouse Jr. made contact with the wall in turn 2. The race restarted on lap 80. Debris on the backstretch brought out the third caution of the race on lap 125. The race restarted on lap 130.

After leading the first 147 laps, Harvick surrendered the lead to Brad Keselowski on lap 148. He was dealing with a problem with the left-front suspension.

J. J. Yeley brought out the fourth caution on lap 171 after brushing the wall in turn 2. Keselowski traded the lead with Harvick on pit road thanks to pitting before the start/finish line. Harvick retained the lead off pit road.

The race restarted on lap 176. Kevin Harvick ducked onto pit road on lap 249 and handed the lead to Matt Kenseth. Kenseth made his stop the next lap and handed the lead to Clint Bowyer. Bowyer made his stop the next lap and handed the lead to Jamie McMurray.

Harvick cut his left front tire and brought out the fifth caution of the race on lap 254. Keselowski assumed the lead as a result.

The race restarted on lap 261. Jeff Gordon took the lead on lap 305. Gordon made his final pit stop on lap 328 and handed the lead to Matt Kenseth. Kenseth made his final stop on lap 329 and handed the lead to Carl Edwards. Edwards made his final stop on lap 330.

Jeff Gordon cycled back to the lead and kept it to score his 92nd career win. “I knew we could compete with the 2 car [Keselowski],” Gordon said. “The 2 was really good on short runs but we could run them down. He made us work for it there at the end... He got to me and I was really, really tight in traffic there at the end, so I didn't know if we were gonna pull it off.” Kevin Harvick, who led a race high 223 laps before cutting a left-front tire, finished 13th one lap down. "I don't know what happened to Kevin Harvick," Gordon said. "That was unfortunate for him. He was the class of the field. ... I was really tight in traffic there at the end. I didn't know if we were going to pull it off." "We can beat every car on the race track. We just need some good luck," Harvick adds. "We'll win races and have a shot at the championship." Kasey Kahne secured the twelfth and final spot in the points to advance to the Contender Round. “I had to push hard,” Kahne said. “I'm glad NASCAR just let us go and let us race for it. It was pretty interesting, but I'm glad we made it. We had to fight hard, and I think we had a Top-2 or 3 car today – just didn't get to show it.” With this being the final race of the Challenger Round, A. J. Allmendinger, Kurt Busch, Greg Biffle and Aric Almirola were the bottom four drivers in points that were eliminated.

=== Race results ===
| Pos | No. | Driver | Team | Manufacturer | Laps | Points |
|---|---|---|---|---|---|---|
| 1 | 24 | Jeff Gordon | Hendrick Motorsports | Chevrolet | 400 | 47 |
| 2 | 2 | Brad Keselowski | Team Penske | Ford | 400 | 43 |
| 3 | 48 | Jimmie Johnson | Hendrick Motorsports | Chevrolet | 400 | 41 |
| 4 | 22 | Joey Logano | Team Penske | Ford | 400 | 40 |
| 5 | 20 | Matt Kenseth | Joe Gibbs Racing | Toyota | 400 | 40 |
| 6 | 42 | Kyle Larson (R) | Chip Ganassi Racing | Chevrolet | 400 | 38 |
| 7 | 78 | Martin Truex Jr. | Furniture Row Racing | Chevrolet | 400 | 37 |
| 8 | 31 | Ryan Newman | Richard Childress Racing | Chevrolet | 400 | 36 |
| 9 | 15 | Clint Bowyer | Michael Waltrip Racing | Toyota | 400 | 36 |
| 10 | 18 | Kyle Busch | Joe Gibbs Racing | Toyota | 400 | 34 |
| 11 | 99 | Carl Edwards | Roush Fenway Racing | Ford | 400 | 34 |
| 12 | 11 | Denny Hamlin | Joe Gibbs Racing | Toyota | 400 | 32 |
| 13 | 4 | Kevin Harvick | Stewart–Haas Racing | Chevrolet | 399 | 33 |
| 14 | 14 | Tony Stewart | Stewart–Haas Racing | Chevrolet | 399 | 30 |
| 15 | 55 | Brian Vickers | Michael Waltrip Racing | Toyota | 399 | 29 |
| 16 | 27 | Paul Menard | Richard Childress Racing | Chevrolet | 399 | 28 |
| 17 | 88 | Dale Earnhardt Jr. | Hendrick Motorsports | Chevrolet | 399 | 27 |
| 18 | 41 | Kurt Busch | Stewart–Haas Racing | Chevrolet | 399 | 26 |
| 19 | 17 | Ricky Stenhouse Jr. | Roush Fenway Racing | Ford | 399 | 25 |
| 20 | 5 | Kasey Kahne | Hendrick Motorsports | Chevrolet | 399 | 24 |
| 21 | 16 | Greg Biffle | Roush Fenway Racing | Ford | 399 | 23 |
| 22 | 1 | Jamie McMurray | Chip Ganassi Racing | Chevrolet | 398 | 23 |
| 23 | 47 | A. J. Allmendinger | JTG Daugherty Racing | Chevrolet | 398 | 21 |
| 24 | 3 | Austin Dillon (R) | Richard Childress Racing | Chevrolet | 398 | 20 |
| 25 | 10 | Danica Patrick | Stewart–Haas Racing | Chevrolet | 398 | 19 |
| 26 | 9 | Marcos Ambrose | Richard Petty Motorsports | Ford | 398 | 18 |
| 27 | 13 | Casey Mears | Germain Racing | Chevrolet | 397 | 17 |
| 28 | 43 | Aric Almirola | Richard Petty Motorsports | Ford | 397 | 16 |
| 29 | 51 | Justin Allgaier (R) | HScott Motorsports | Chevrolet | 395 | 15 |
| 30 | 26 | Cole Whitt (R) | BK Racing | Toyota | 395 | 14 |
| 31 | 34 | David Ragan | Front Row Motorsports | Ford | 395 | 13 |
| 32 | 36 | Reed Sorenson | Tommy Baldwin Racing | Chevrolet | 394 | 12 |
| 33 | 38 | David Gilliland | Front Row Motorsports | Ford | 393 | 11 |
| 34 | 23 | Alex Bowman (R) | BK Racing | Toyota | 391 | 10 |
| 35 | 40 | Landon Cassill | Hillman–Circle Sport | Chevrolet | 391 | 0 |
| 36 | 37 | Mike Bliss | Tommy Baldwin Racing | Chevrolet | 391 | 0 |
| 37 | 33 | David Stremme | Hillman–Circle Sport | Chevrolet | 389 | 7 |
| 38 | 83 | Travis Kvapil | BK Racing | Toyota | 389 | 6 |
| 39 | 32 | J. J. Yeley | Go FAS Racing | Ford | 387 | 0 |
| 40 | 66 | Mike Wallace | Identity Ventures Racing | Toyota | 384 | 0 |
| 41 | 7 | Michael Annett (R) | Tommy Baldwin Racing | Chevrolet | 361 | 3 |
| 42 | 98 | Josh Wise | Phil Parsons Racing | Chevrolet | 197 | 2 |
| 43 | 44 | Timmy Hill | Team XTREME Racing | Chevrolet | 11 | 1 |

=== Race statistics ===
- 10 lead changes among different drivers
- 5 cautions for 23 laps
- Time of race: 3:03:51
- Jeff Gordon won his fourth race in 2014

== Media ==
=== Television ===
ESPN
| Booth announcers | Pit reporters |
|---|---|
| Lap-by-lap: Allen Bestwick; Color-commentator: Dale Jarrett; Color commentator: Andy Petree | Jerry Punch; Dave Burns; Vince Welch; Jamie Little |

=== Radio ===
MRN Radio
| Booth announcers | Turn announcers | Pit reporters |
|---|---|---|
| Lead announcer: Joe Moore; Announcer: Jeff Striegle | Backstretch: Mike Bagley | Winston Kelley; Steve Post; Alex Hayden; Woody Cain |

== Standings after the race ==
Drivers' Championship standings

| | Pos | Driver | Points |
|---|---|---|---|
| | 1 | Brad Keselowski | 3,000 |
| | 2 | Joey Logano | 3,000 (-0) |
| | 3 | Kevin Harvick | 3,000 (-0) |
| | 4 | Jimmie Johnson | 3,000 (-0) |
| 2 | 5 | Jeff Gordon | 3,000 (-0) |
| 1 | 6 | Kyle Busch | 3,000 (-0) |
| 1 | 7 | Dale Earnhardt Jr. | 3,000 (-0) |
| | 8 | Matt Kenseth | 3,000 (-0) |
| 3 | 9 | Ryan Newman | 3,000 (-0) |
| 1 | 10 | Carl Edwards | 3,000 (-0) |
| 2 | 11 | Denny Hamlin | 3,000 (-0) |
| 1 | 12 | Kasey Kahne | 3,000 (-0) |
| 3 | 13 | A. J. Allmendinger | 2,077 (-923) |
| 1 | 14 | Kurt Busch | 2,073 (-927) |
| 1 | 15 | Greg Biffle | 2,072 (-928) |
| | 16 | Aric Almirola | 2,061 (-939) |

Manufacturers' Championship standings

| Pos | Manufacturer | Points |
|---|---|---|
| 1 | Chevrolet | 1,298 |
| 2 | Ford | 1,273 (-25) |
| 3 | Toyota | 1,161 (-137) |

- Note: Only the first sixteen positions are included for the driver standings.

| Previous race: 2014 Sylvania 300 | Sprint Cup Series; 2014 season | Next race: 2014 Hollywood Casino 400 |
