= Hillman–Circle Sport =

Former NASCAR team

Circle Sport Racing
- Owner: Joe Falk
- Base: Mooresville, North Carolina
- Series: Monster Energy NASCAR Cup Series
- Manufacturer: Chevrolet
- Opened: 2011
- Closed: 2015

Career
- Debut: Monster Energy Nascar Cup Series: 2012 Samsung Mobile 500 (Texas); Camping World Truck Series: 2012 NextEra Energy Resources 250 (Daytona)
- Latest race: Monster Energy Nascar Cup Series: 2015 Ford EcoBoost 400 (Homestead); Camping World Truck Series: 2013 Ford EcoBoost 200 (Homestead)
- Races competed: Total: 230; Monster Energy Nascar Cup Series: 186; Camping World Truck Series: 44
- Drivers' Championships: Total: 0 Monster Energy Nascar Cup Series: 0 Camping World Truck Series: 0
- Race victories: Total: 0 Monster Energy Nascar Cup Series: 0 Camping World Truck Series: 0
- Pole positions: Total: 0 Monster Energy Nascar Cup Series: 0 Camping World Truck Series: 0

Circle Sport Racing was an American professional stock car racing team that competed in the Monster Energy NASCAR Cup Series. The team was formed in 2011 as LTD PowerSports, fielding the No. 50 for T. J. Bell, and later in 2012, the team fielded the No. 40 and the No. 33 part-time in the Monster Energy NASCAR Cup Series, while fielding the No. 27 in the Camping World Truck Series. In 2014, the team pulled out of the truck series and began fielding the No. 40 Cup car full-time, alongside the part-time No. 33.

Throughout most of its existence, the team was legally known as Hillman-Circle Sport LLC, with the No. 33 and No. 40 Monster Energy NASCAR Cup Series entries branded as Circle Sport LLC and Hillman Racing respectively. During this time, Circle Sport (which purchased the No. 33 from Richard Childress Racing seven races into 2012) rented the No. 33 points to RCR for several races per season.

After the 2015 season, the team shut down, with parts of the team sold to RCR and Premium Motorsports. Circle Sport owner Joe Falk later became an investor of the Leavine Family Racing team, merging Circle Sport to form Circle Sport – Leavine Family Racing. The team returned in 2017 as Circle Sport, merging with The Motorsports Group.

== Monster Energy NASCAR Cup Series ==
=== Car No. 33 history ===
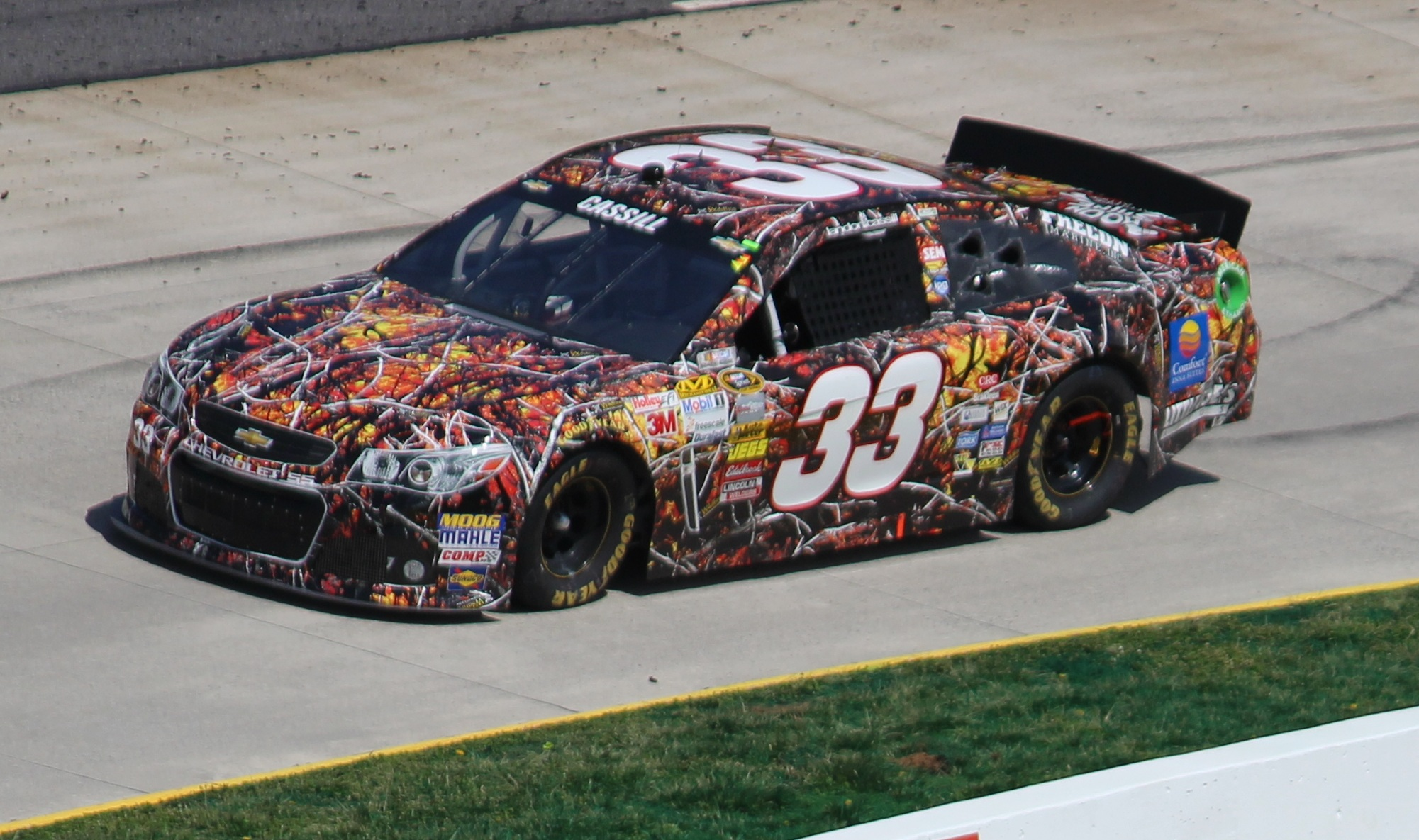
The No. 33 driven by Landon Cassill in the 2013 STP Gas Booster 500

In 2011 Joe Falk, former owner of LJ Racing, returned to team ownership in the NASCAR Sprint Cup Series, running the No. 50 for LTD Powersports with driver T. J. Bell on a limited basis starting with the Southern 500 at Darlington. Bell competed for Rookie of the Year during the season, but only qualified for five races, four of them with Falk's team, which failed to qualify for nine additional races.

==== 2012 and ROTY ====
The team entered the No. 40 as Hillman Racing at the 2012 Daytona 500 for Michael Waltrip, and at Bristol for Tony Raines, failing to qualify at Daytona and withdrawing from Bristol prior to practice. Before the April race at Texas, Falk announced that he was purchasing the No. 33 Sprint Cup Series team from Richard Childress Racing. The team, one Childress had planned to run for only the first five races of the season due to lack of sponsorship, was transferred to Falk's ownership after the sixth race at Martinsville. Falk and Mike Hillman formed Circle Sport to field the 33 team. The 33 team ran Martinsville with Hermie Sadler as a collaboration between Circle Sport and RCR. The team's first race under full Circle Sport control was at Texas, where Tony Raines drove an unsponsored Chevrolet. Falk planned to run a number of drivers in the car over the remainder of the season, including Raines, Jeff Green, Stephen Leicht, Austin Dillon, Hermie and Elliott Sadler, and C. E. Falk. However, in late May it was announced that Leicht would be competing for the team for the majority of the remainder of the season, attempting to win Rookie of the Year honors, except for the June race at Michigan, where Childress ran the No. 33 for Austin Dillon. Cole Whitt also ran some races in a Start and park role. Leicht would win Rookie of the Year honors despite competing in just 15 races, finishing with a team-best 26th at Watkins Glen.

==== 2013 ====
For 2013, Circle Sport maintained its alliance with Richard Childress Racing. Former BK Racing driver Landon Cassill took over the No. 33 for the majority of the season with Dillon and Brian Scott in the 33 as an Richard Childress Racing entry. For the road courses, road course ringer Ron Fellows ran the 33 for Circle Sport with sponsorship from Canadian Tire. Following the introduction of the No. 40 entry at Indianapolis, Tony Raines and Landon Cassill would rotate seats in these cars when Circle Sport fielded both the 33 and 40 entries.

==== 2014 ====
The 33 was run as an Richard Childress Racing entry for the first two races of 2014 with Brian Scott and family sponsors Shore Lodge and Whitetail Club. Timmy Hill drove the next two races for Circle Sport. Hill was involved in a controversial wreck at Bristol immediately following an accident. Hill was running in last place, when Matt Kenseth (in second place at the time), checked up for a wreck in front of him. Hill did not see the caution lights and did not cut his speed, smashing into Kenseth's back bumper at high speed. Fox analyst Darrell Waltrip first stated in a harsh tone "Good grief.", and then called it a "rookie mistake" for Hill (who had run for rookie of the year in 2013), though he slightly recanted his harsh tone later in the broadcast.

After Scott drove the 33 at Auto Club as an RCR entry, David Stremme took over the Circle Sport entry at Martinsville, Darlington and Richmond, while failing to qualify at Texas. Scott and RCR ran the car again at Talladega (where Scott won the pole award) and Charlotte, with Hill returning to Circle Sport in between at Kansas. Stremme ran at Dover, Michigan and Kentucky, while Alex Kennedy ran at both Pocono races and the road courses, with more races possible. Bobby Labonte ran an RCR car under the Circle Sport banner at Daytona in July, the same one that sat on the Talladega pole with Scott.

At the Camping World RV Sales 301 at Loudon in July, 72-year-old veteran Morgan Shepherd ran a Circle Sport car with Thunder Coal sponsoring its third race. The 33 team created another controversy when Shepherd wrecked Joey Logano, who was running second at the time. Shepherd was, as Logano pointed out, the slowest car on the racetrack. NASCAR defended Shepherd, saying he maintained a minimum running speed in relation to the leaders. Shepherd finished as the last car running in 39th place, 27 laps down.

Stremme returned to the No. 33 at Indianapolis with Thunder Coal, but failed to qualify. After Kennedy's previously announced starts at Pocono and Watkins Glen, the team fielded him for a fifth time at Michigan. Stremme then ran Bristol. Ty Dillon drove an RCR entry at Atlanta in August. Dillon had tested a car numbered 33 for Furniture Row Racing at Texas in March.

At Richmond, the No. 33 was renumbered No. 90 to honor Junie Donlavey, with Stremme driving. The one-off was painted in the style of Donlavey's Truxmore-sponsored cars and the decklid contained the names of the 67 drivers who raced for Donlavey. Stremme was originally on the entry list at Chicagoland, but was replaced at the last minute by Travis Kvapil. Stremme ran New Hampshire and Dover, after which Hill returned for the second Kansas race and Charlotte. Stremme was again placed on the entry list at Talladega before being replaced by Kvapil, who delivered the No. 33 its first top ten finish (sixth, tying a career-best mark for Kvapil as well) under the Circle Sport banner on the same day Cassill piloted the No. 40 to the overall team's first top five. Kvapil would run Martinsville as well, with Hill returning again for Texas, in the final race of 2014 for the No. 33 under the Circle Sport banner.

RCR returned for the final two races of the season with Ty Dillon at Phoenix and Brian Scott at Homestead.

==== 2015 ====
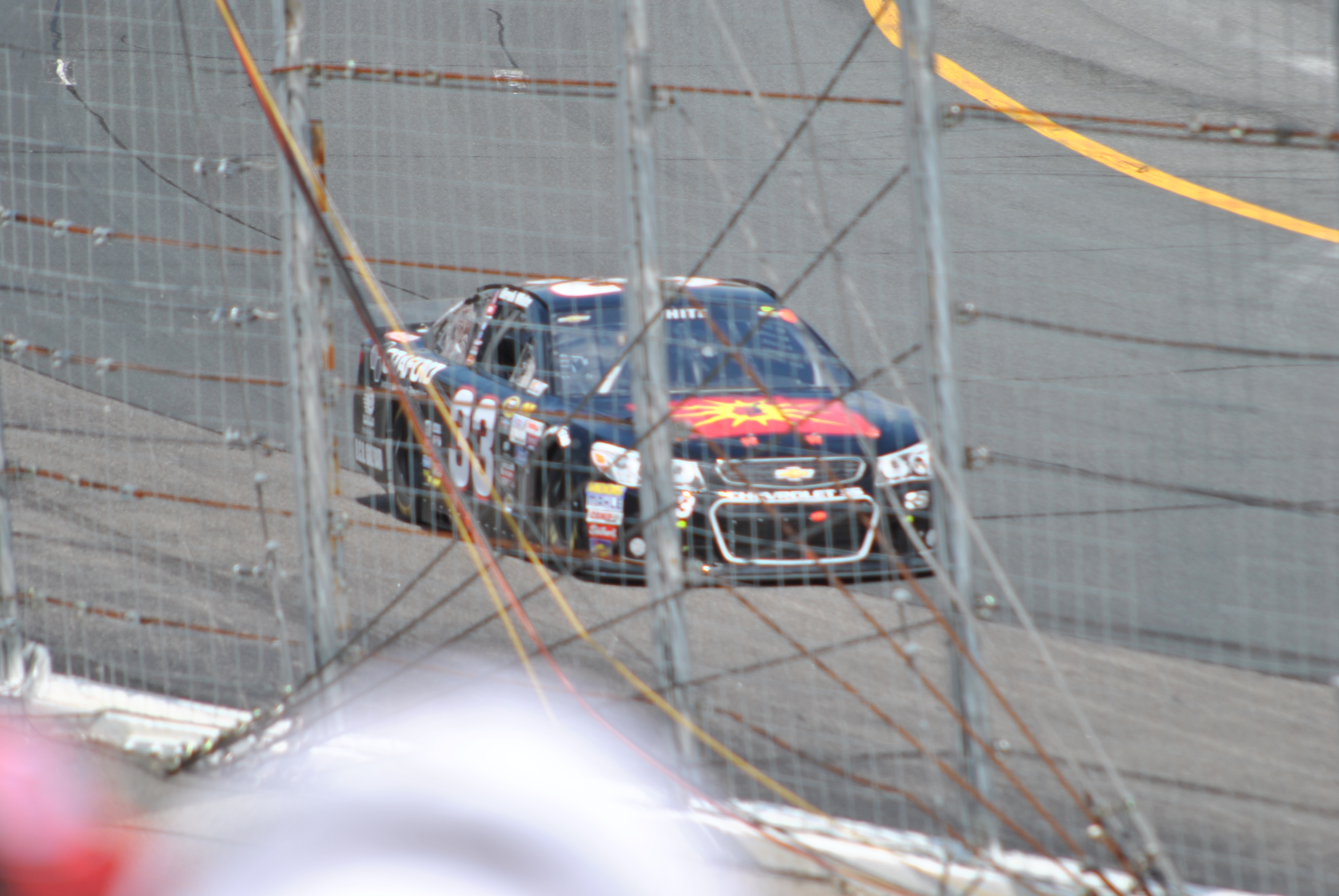
Derek White driving the No. 33 at Loudon

RCR drivers were scheduled to be in the No. 33 at the first three races of the season, with Ty Dillon at Daytona and Brian Scott at Atlanta and Las Vegas. However Scott, scheduled to run at Atlanta for Circle Sport, would give up his ride to HScott Motorsports after Michael Annett failed to qualify his normal HScott ride (under NASCAR rules, Joe Falk was credited with the owner's points). Road racer Alex Kennedy returned to the team at Phoenix, became the primary driver of the No. 33 when under Circle Sport control and declaring for Rookie of the Year. However, Derek White drove the July race at New Hampshire, bringing sponsorship from Braille Battery and Grafoid. After Watkins Glen in August, Kennedy was replaced as Circle Sport's primary No. 33 driver with a series of drivers, including Mike Bliss and B. J. McLeod. Kennedy returned to the team at Dover.

After the season, Falk joined Leavine Family Racing's ownership group after splitting with Hillman, retaining control of the charter granted for the #33 and using it on Leavine's #95 for the season.

In 2017, Circle Sport returned after merging with The Motorsports Group, with Jeffrey Earnhardt driving the No. 33.

In 2018, the team planned to run a limited schedule with Joey Gase after Falk partnered with Go Fas Racing, but the team did not make any attempts in the season.

There were talks of Austin Theriault running for this team in at least Loudon in 2019 in partnership with GFR, but plans ultimately fell through.

==== Car No. 33 results ====
Year	Driver	No.	Make	1	2	3	4	5	6	7	8	9	10	11	12	13	14	15	16	17	18	19	20	21	22	23	24	25	26	27	28	29	30	31	32	33	34	35	36	MENCC	Pts
2011	T. J. Bell	50	Toyota	DAY	PHO	LVS	BRI	CAL	MAR	TEX	TAL	RCH	DAR; 38	DOV	CLT; DNQ	KAN; DNQ	POC; 39	MCH	SON	DAY	KEN; DNQ	NHA																		53rd	14
2011	T. J. Bell	50	Chevy																				IND; 42	POC; DNQ	GLN; 37	MCH; DNQ	BRI; DNQ	ATL; DNQ	RCH; DNQ	CHI	NHA; DNQ	DOV	KAN	CLT	TAL	MAR	TEX	PHO	HOM	53rd	14
2012	Tony Raines	33	Chevy	DAY	PHO	LVS	BRI	CAL	MAR	TEX; 34			TAL; 38																											37th	253
2012	Jeff Green	33	Chevy								KAN; DNQ																													37th	253
2012	Stephen Leicht	33	Chevy									RCH; 35		DAR; DNQ	CLT; 39	DOV; 35	POC; 33	MCH	SON; 41	KEN; 41	DAY; 42	NHA; 32	IND; 31	POC; DNQ	GLN; 26	MCH; DNQ	BRI; 40	ATL; DNQ	RCH; 36		NHA; 34					MAR; 34	TEX; DNQ	PHO; 35	HOM; DNQ	37th	253
2012	Cole Whitt	33	Chevy																											CHI; 37		DOV; DNQ	TAL; 40	CLT; DNQ	KAN; DNQ					37th	253
2013	Landon Cassill	33	Chevy	DAY	PHO; 32	LVS; 42	BRI; 33	CAL; 30	MAR; 33	TEX; 34	KAN; 29	RCH; 25	TAL; 22	DAR; 30	CLT; 37	DOV; 32	POC; 38	MCH		KEN; 36	DAY; 24	NHA; 32	IND			MCH; 32						DOV; 38	KAN; 33	CLT	TAL; 37				HOM; 33	38th	441
2013	Ron Fellows	33	Chevy																SON; 22						GLN; 35															38th	441
2013	Tony Raines	33	Chevy																					POC; 38			BRI; 32	ATL	RCH; 33	CHI; 40	NHA; 41					MAR; 41	TEX	PHO; 43		38th	441
2014	Timmy Hill	33	Chevy	DAY	PHO	LVS; 38	BRI; 43	CAL						KAN; 40	CLT																		KAN; 33	CLT; 36			TEX; 35	PHO	HOM	40th	337
2014	David Stremme	33	Chevy						MAR; 39	TEX; DNQ	DAR; 36	RCH; 35	TAL			DOV; 37		MCH; 39		KEN; 35			IND; DNQ				BRI; 31	ATL			NHA; 40	DOV; 37								40th	337
2014	David Stremme	90	Chevy																										RCH; 36											40th	337
2014	Alex Kennedy	33	Chevy														POC; 39		SON; 39					POC; 28	GLN; 33	MCH; 34														40th	337
2014	Bobby Labonte	33	Chevy																		DAY; 26																			40th	337
2014	Morgan Shepherd	33	Chevy																			NHA; 39																		40th	337
2014	Travis Kvapil	33	Chevy																											CHI; 38					TAL; 6	MAR; 41				40th	337
2015	Brian Scott	33	Chevy	DAY	ATL; QL^{†}																																			35th	458
2015	Michael Annett	33	Chevy		ATL; 29	LVS																																		35th	458
2015	Alex Kennedy	33	Chevy				PHO; 38	CAL	MAR; 33	TEX; 37	BRI; 33	RCH; 39	TAL	KAN	CLT; 36	DOV	POC	MCH	SON; 25	DAY	KEN; 40			POC; 38	GLN; 28							DOV; 38	CLT; 34	KAN		MAR; 33	TEX			35th	458
2015	Derek White	33	Chevy																			NHA; 39	IND																	35th	458
2015	Travis Kvapil	33	Chevy																							MCH; 40									TAL; 35					35th	458
2015	Mike Bliss	33	Chevy																								BRI; 37	DAR; 32	RCH	CHI										35th	458
2015	B. J. McLeod	33	Chevy																												NHA; 34									35th	458
2015	Ryan Ellis	33	Chevy																																			PHO; 40	HOM	35th	458
2017	Jeffrey Earnhardt	33	Chevy	DAY; 26	ATL; 33	LVS; 32	PHO; 39	CAL; 39	MAR; 36	TEX; 40	BRI; 27	RCH; 35	TAL; 28	KAN; 33	CLT; 40	DOV; 27	POC; 34	MCH; 35		DAY; 37	KEN; 29	NHA; 33	IND; 26	POC; 36		MCH; 35	BRI; 40	DAR; 30	RCH; 34	CHI; 34	NHA; 38	DOV; 37	CLT; 30	TAL; 38	KAN; 26	MAR; 38	TEX; 33	PHO; 29	HOM; 32	37th	160
2017	Boris Said	33	Chevy																SON; 29						GLN; 30															37th	160
^{†} - Qualified but replaced by Michael Annett

=== Car No. 39 history ===
==== 2015 ====
The No. 39 was placed on the entry list at Texas in April 2015, with Travis Kvapil driving. The car is part of the Hillman Racing-Gordon Smith stable. However, the team opted to withdraw on the Wednesday before the race. The No. 39 made its next attempt at the Sprint Showdown at Charlotte, also with Kvapil behind the wheel. Again, the team withdrew by Wednesday before the race. The week after at the Coca-Cola 600, the No. 39 was put on the initial entry list, and attempted the race. However, they posted the 42nd-fastest speed and, with no owner points to fall back on, failed to qualify. The team attempted the Dover race as well, but ran 37th, one spot short of qualifying on speed, and once again missed the race.

==== Car No. 39 results ====
Year	Driver	No.	Make	1	2	3	4	5	6	7	8	9	10	11	12	13	14	15	16	17	18	19	20	21	22	23	24	25	26	27	28	29	30	31	32	33	34	35	36	NSCC	Pts
2015	Travis Kvapil	39	Chevy	DAY	ATL	LVS	PHO	CAL	MAR	TEX; Wth	BRI	RCH	TAL	KAN	CLT; DNQ	DOV; DNQ	POC	MCH	SON	DAY	KEN	NHA	IND	POC	GLN	MCH	BRI	DAR	RCH	CHI	NHA	DOV	CLT	KAN	TAL	MAR	TEX	PHO	HOM	51st	0

=== Car No. 40 history ===
==== 2012–2013: Part-time ====
Falk and Hillman partnered to field a No. 40 Aaron's Toyota for Michael Waltrip at the 2012 Daytona 500, using equipment from Michael Waltrip Racing. However the team failed to qualify. The No. 40 team also entered Bristol with Tony Raines, but withdrew. Hillman and Falk then bought the points of RCR's No. 33 car before the Texas race, and used that number instead, fielding Chevrolets. The No. 40 was not seen again until July 2013 at Indianapolis, Circle Sport, when the team began fielding the No. 40 as a second car. This move allowed Landon Cassill and Circle Sport to compete in races in which RCR drivers Austin Dillon and Brian Scott were scheduled to run the No. 33 with Richard Childress Racing. Later, the team began entering the No. 40 during races when it also entered the No. 33. Tony Raines and Cassill rotated seats in each entry.

Cassill's best finish of the year was 22nd at the spring Talladega race, while the best finish for Raines was 29th at the fall Kansas race.

==== 2014–2016 ====
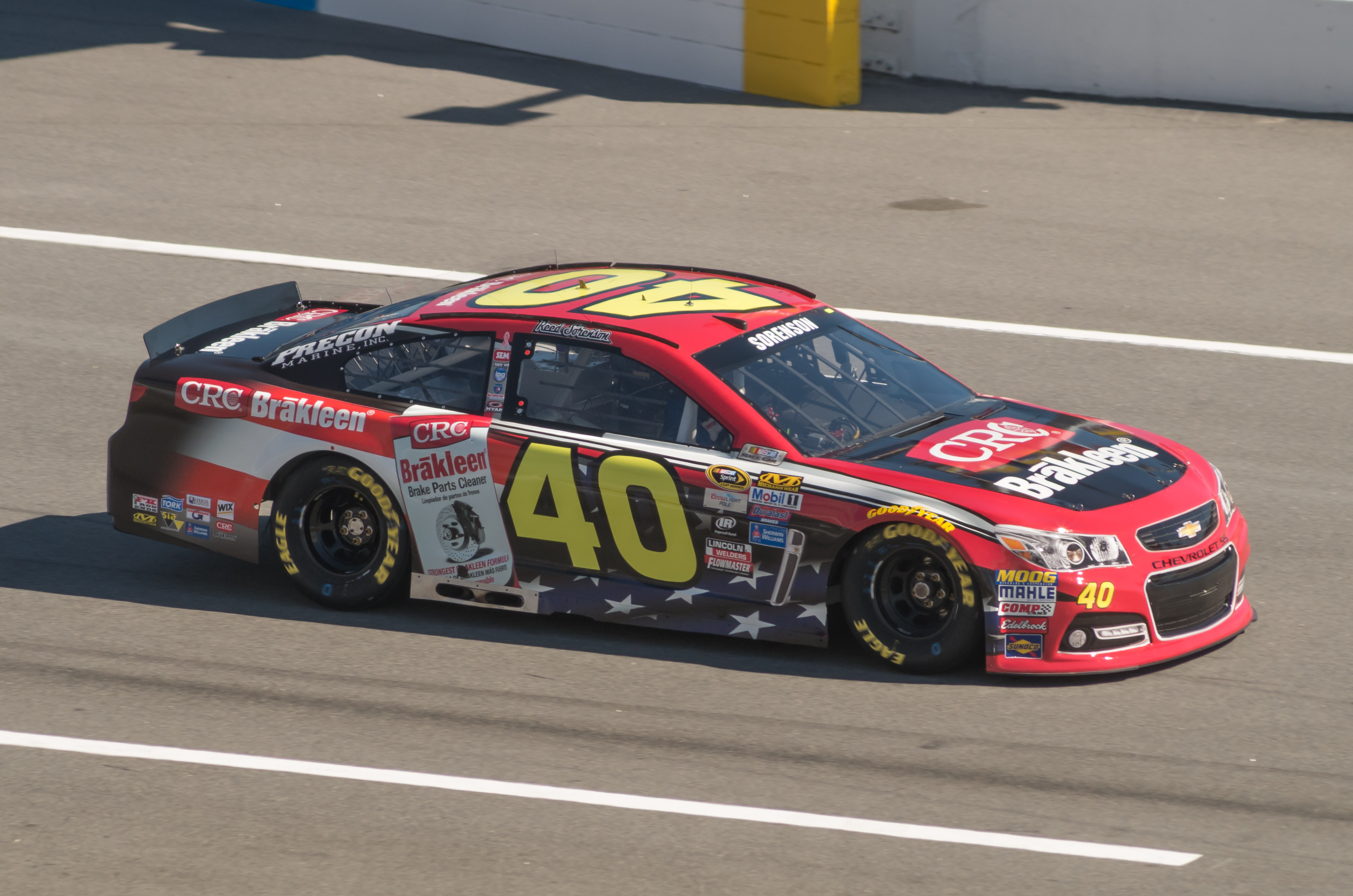
Reed Sorenson in the No. 40 at Daytona in 2016

For 2014, Cassill was named the primary driver of the team's number 40 car, which entered full-time competition as the team's primary entry. Cassill began the season with a 12th-place finish at the Daytona 500. He then failed to qualify for the next two races, but made every race after for the rest of the year, which included his and the team's first top five (and top ten) finish, a fourth at the GEICO 500 at Talladega. In that same race, teammate Kvapil finished 6th in the 33. Carsforsale.com, Newtown Building Supplies, and CRC Brakleen sponsored several races.

Cassill returned for his third season in the No. 40 in 2015. On February 12, businessman Gordon Smith joined the team as co-owner, and the No. 40 team was rebranded as Hillman Smith Motorsports. The team got off to a bad start, becoming the first team to finish last in the first two races after back-to-back engine failures. Cassill best finish was 13th at Daytona. Cassill left the team for Front Row Motorsports following the season. In January 2016, Premium Motorsports purchased the No. 40 team, taking engines, cars, and most of the employees from the No. 40 car, including Mike Hillman. Falk and Hillman, meanwhile, ended their partnership.

Though the No. 40 did not receive a charter for the 2016 season, the team attempted the Daytona 500 with Reed Sorenson, failing to qualify. After the DNQ, the team shut down later that week and auctioned their equipment to Premium Motorsports. Before closing their doors in July 2016, Hillman and the partners of Hillman Racing sued Joe Falk and Circle Sport for control of the #33's charter and all profits & benefits gained from the charter. The suit was settled on June 30 according to reporter Bob Pockrass on Twitter.

Hillman Racing closed their doors in July 2016, with Mike Hillman Sr. taking a role as crew chief for the #46 team. The No. 33 operated until the end of 2017.

==== Car No. 40 results ====
Year	Driver	No.	Make	1	2	3	4	5	6	7	8	9	10	11	12	13	14	15	16	17	18	19	20	21	22	23	24	25	26	27	28	29	30	31	32	33	34	35	36	NSCC	Pts
2012	Michael Waltrip	40	Toyota	DAY; DNQ	PHO	LVS																																		61st	0
2012	Tony Raines	40	Toyota				BRI; Wth	CAL	MAR	TEX	KAN	RCH	TAL	DAR	CLT	DOV	POC	MCH	SON	KEN	DAY	NHA	IND	POC	GLN	MCH	BRI	ATL	RCH	CHI	NHA	DOV	TAL	CLT	KAN	MAR	TEX	PHO	HOM	61st	0
2013	Landon Cassill	40	Chevy	DAY	PHO	LVS	BRI	CAL	MAR	TEX	KAN	RCH	TAL	DAR	CLT	DOV	POC	MCH	SON	KEN	DAY	NHA	IND; 33	POC; 29	GLN; 28		BRI; 23	ATL; 37	RCH; 34	CHI; 29	NHA; 34			CLT; 33		MAR; 29	TEX; 34	PHO; 42		43rd	167
2013	Tony Raines	40	Chevy																							MCH; Wth						DOV; 40	KAN; 29		TAL; 43				HOM; 42	43rd	167
2014	Landon Cassill	40	Chevy	DAY; 12	PHO; DNQ	LVS; DNQ	BRI; 30	CAL; 25	MAR; 25	TEX; 34	DAR; 25	RCH; 26	TAL; 11	KAN; 42	CLT; 36	DOV; 34	POC; 33	MCH; 35	SON; 43	KEN; 32	DAY; 31	NHA; 34	IND; 30	POC; 41	GLN; 29	MCH; 29	BRI; 22	ATL; 31	RCH; 34	CHI; 28	NHA; 25	DOV; 35	KAN; 21	CLT; 23	TAL; 4	MAR; 19	TEX; 43	PHO; 29	HOM; 29	34th	521
2015	Landon Cassill	40	Chevy	DAY; 43	ATL; 43	LVS; 35	PHO; 37	CAL; 25	MAR; 21	TEX; 32	BRI; 43	RCH; 26	TAL; 39	KAN; 29	CLT; 39	DOV; 23	POC; 25	MCH; 31	SON; 36	DAY; 13	KEN; 28	NHA; 30	IND; 26	POC; 14	GLN; 35	MCH; 36	BRI; 38	DAR; 20	RCH; 30	CHI; 27	NHA; 38	DOV; 40	CLT; 23	KAN; 43	TAL; 34	MAR; 21	TEX; 25	PHO; 35	HOM; 35	33rd	481
2016	Reed Sorenson	40	Chevy	DAY; DNQ	ATL	LVS	PHO	CAL	MAR	TEX	BRI	RCH	TAL	KAN	DOV	CLT	POC	MCH	SON	DAY	KEN	NHA	IND	POC	GLN	BRI	MCH	DAR	RCH	CHI	NHA	DOV	CLT	KAN	TAL	MAR	TEX	PHO	HOM	47th	0

=== Drivers ===
Driver	Races	Wins	Poles	DNQ	WD	Top-5s	Top-10s
Landon Cassill	103	0	0	2	0	1	1
Alex Kennedy	18	0	0	0	0	0	0
Stephen Leicht	15	0	0	6	0	0	0
Tony Raines	13	0	0	0	2	0	0
David Stremme	10	0	0	2	0	0	0
Timmy Hill	6	0	0	0	0	0	0
Travis Kvapil	5	0	0	2	1	0	1
T. J. Bell	4	0	0	9	0	0	0
Cole Whitt	2	0	0	3	0	0	0
Ron Fellows	2	0	0	0	0	0	0
Mike Bliss	2	0	0	0	0	0	0
Bobby Labonte	1	0	0	0	0	0	0
Morgan Shepherd	1	0	0	0	0	0	0
Michael Annett	1	0	0	0	0	0	0
Derek White	1	0	0	0	0	0	0
B. J. McLeod	1	0	0	0	0	0	0
Ryan Ellis	1	0	0	0	0	0	0
Michael Waltrip	0	0	0	1	0	0	0
Jeff Green	0	0	0	1	0	0	0
Reed Sorenson	0	0	0	1	0	0	0

== Camping World Truck Series ==
=== Truck No. 27 history ===
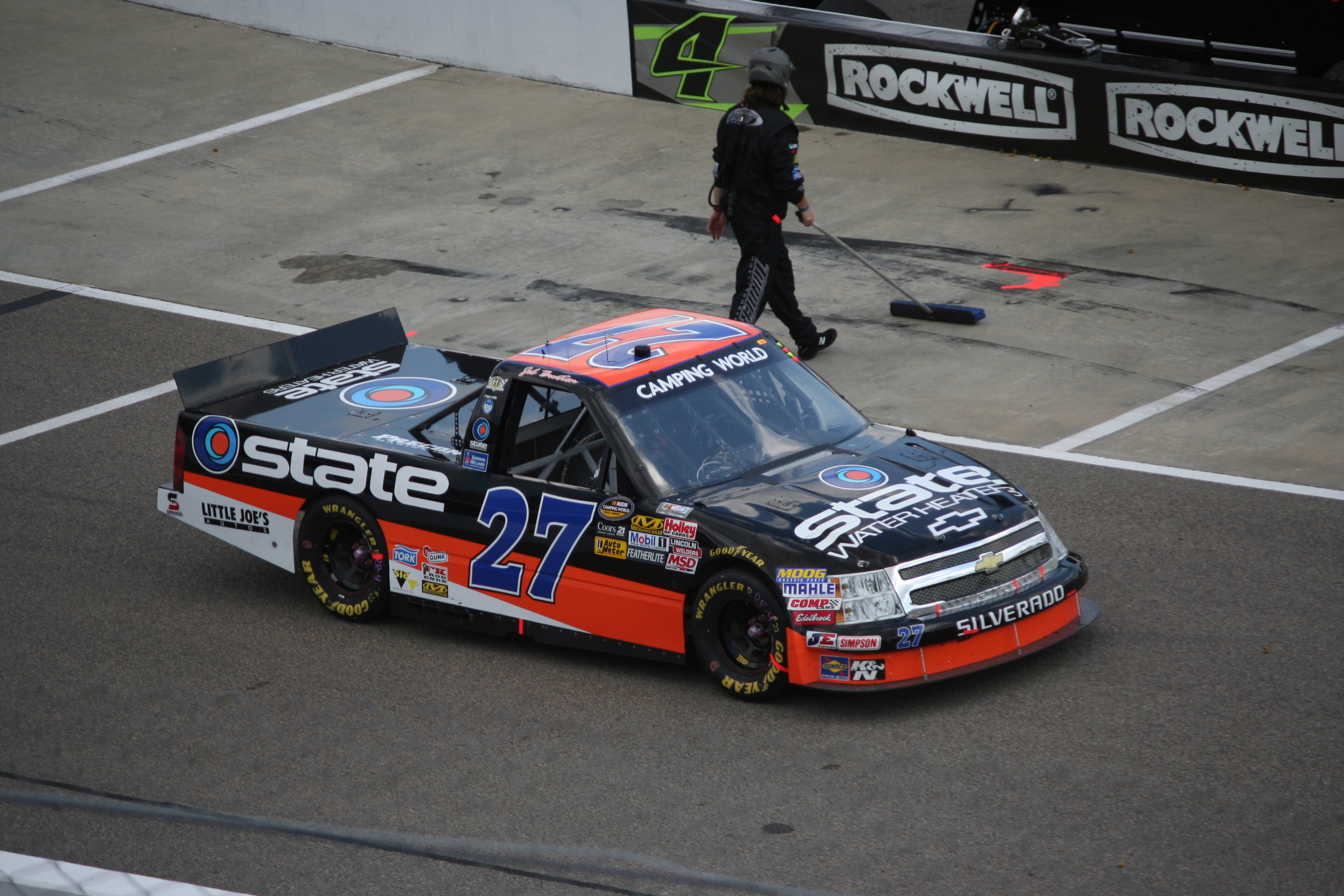
Rookie Jeb Burton at Rockingham in 2012.

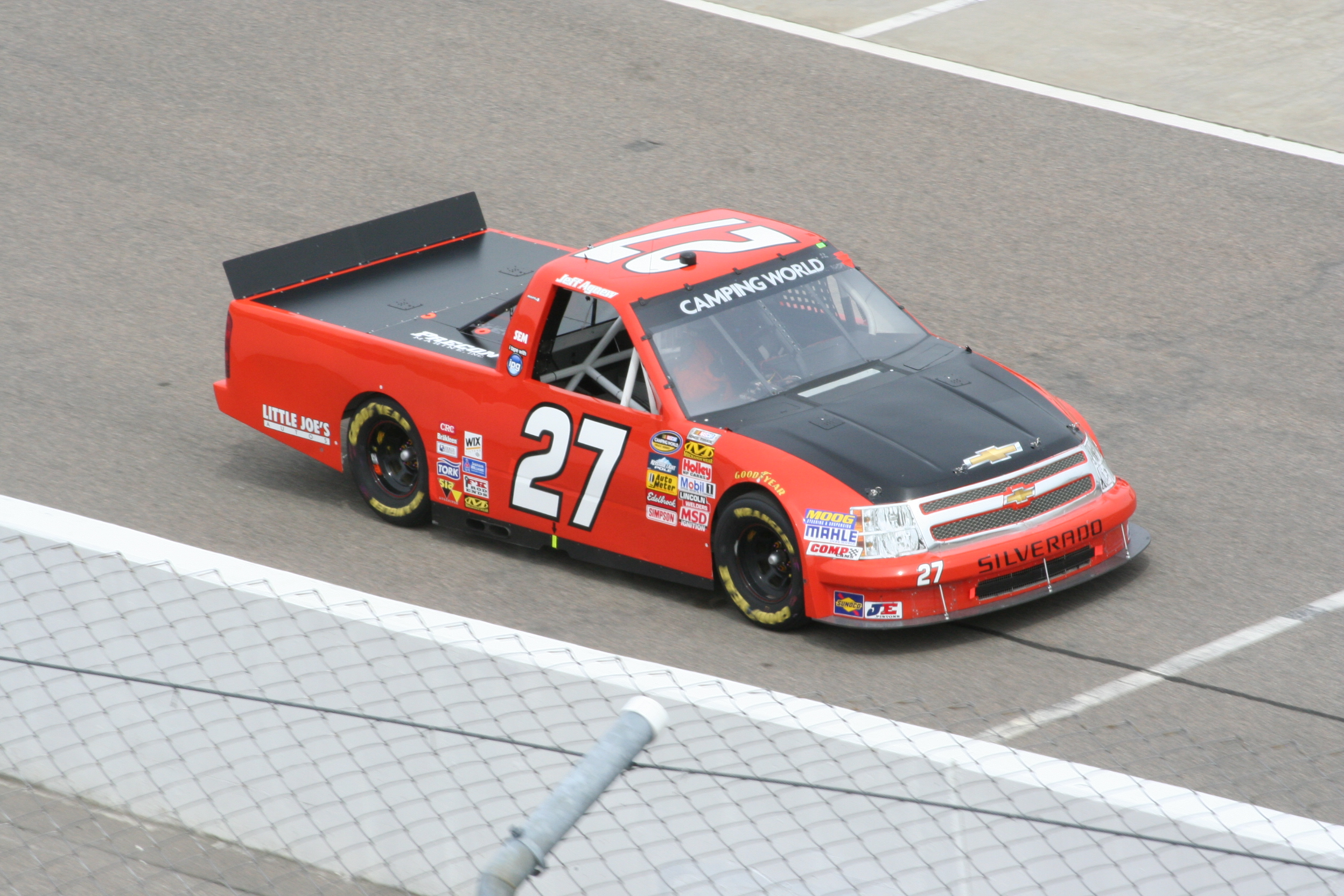
Jeff Agnew at Rockingham in 2013.

=== 2012 ===
It was announced in January 2012 that former Daytona 500 winner Ward Burton would run the Daytona Camping World Truck Series race for Hillman Racing's No. 27 Chevrolet Silverado, after being out of competition for 5 years. Burton would be joined by State Water Heaters, which had sponsored him in the Sprint Cup Series with Morgan–McClure Motorsports. Ward's 19-year-old son Jeb Burton (not approved to run at Superspeedways) would then take over the truck for select races beginning with his series debut at Martinsville in March. The new team would use the equipment from Richard Childress Racing that took Austin Dillon to a series championship in 2011. Ward drove the truck to an 8th-place finish in his only start. Jeb would then run the next 5 races, finishing 13th in his debut, 11th at Rockingham, and a strong 8th at Charlotte. The team also would enter a second No. 25 truck in several races, with 6 DNFs. Brandon Knupp, C. E. Falk, B. J. McLeod, Travis Miller, Stephen Leicht, and Ryan Lynch would all run races for the team. Cole Whitt would drive the 27 to a solid 13th-place finish at Talladega. Twenty-year-old Ryan Truex was then signed to drive the 27 (the team's tenth driver of the season) beginning at Martinsville in October. Ryan finished 17th in his truck series debut, then returned two races later at Phoenix, finishing 11th. Veteran driver Jason Leffler would wheel the 27 truck in the season finale at Homestead, with Travis Miller returning in 25 Truck. Leffler would finish 19th, while Miller finished 26th.

Jeb Burton and crew chief Mike Hillman, Jr. would move to the 4 truck of Turner Scott Motorsports for 2013.

=== 2013 ===
For 2013, Hillman Racing merged its efforts with Team 7 Motorsports, who fielded the 70 truck in 2012. Team 7's driver, 47-year-old Pro Cup Series Champion Jeff Agnew was signed to drive for the team beginning at Daytona in February. In May, the team announced a partnership with the West Virginia Coal Association and Friends of Coal beginning at Charlotte. The team entered 17 races (withdrawing from two) and scored 11 top 25 finishes, with a best finish of 15th at Kentucky.

==== Truck No. 25 results ====
Year	Driver	No.	Make	1	2	3	4	5	6	7	8	9	10	11	12	13	14	15	16	17	18	19	20	21	22	Owners	Pts
2012	Brandon Knupp	25	Chevy	DAY	MAR	CAR	KAN	CLT	DOV	TEX	KEN	IOW	CHI	POC; 30							TAL; 36	MAR				63rd	14
2012	Stephen Leicht	25	Chevy												MCH; 30	BRI	ATL	IOW	KEN					PHO; 31		63rd	14
2012	B. J. McLeod	25	Chevy																	LVS; 32			TEX; 33			63rd	14
2012	Travis Miller	25	Chevy																						HOM; 26	63rd	14

==== Truck No. 27 results ====
Year	Driver	No.	Make	1	2	3	4	5	6	7	8	9	10	11	12	13	14	15	16	17	18	19	20	21	22	Owners	Pts
2012	Ward Burton	27	Chevy	DAY; 8																						22nd	469
2012	Jeb Burton	27	Chevy		MAR; 13	CAR; 11	KAN; 36	CLT; 8	DOV; 19																	22nd	469
2012	Brandon Knupp	27	Chevy							TEX; 35					MCH; 27											22nd	469
2012	C. E. Falk	27	Chevy								KEN; 34		CHI; 29	POC; 16												22nd	469
2012	Travis Miller	27	Chevy									IOW; 31							KEN; 24	LVS; 26						22nd	469
2012	B. J. McLeod	27	Chevy													BRI; 15										22nd	469
2012	Stephen Leicht	27	Chevy														ATL; 34						TEX; 32			22nd	469
2012	Ryan Lynch	27	Chevy															IOW; 29								22nd	469
2012	Cole Whitt	27	Chevy																		TAL; 13					22nd	469
2012	Ryan Truex	27	Chevy																			MAR; 19		PHO; 9		22nd	469
2012	Jason Leffler	27	Chevy																						HOM; 19	22nd	469
2013	Jeff Agnew	27	Chevy	DAY; 23	MAR; 23	CAR; 35	KAN; 23	CLT; 21	DOV; 23	TEX	KEN; 15	IOW; 20	ELD	POC; 23	MCH	BRI; 31	MSP	IOW; 30	CHI; 18	LVS	TAL; 28	MAR; 15	TEX	PHO	HOM; 18	27th	314

== K&N Pro Series / ARCA Racing Series ==
In 2015, Hillman Racing partnered with Ranier Racing with MDM to field two cars (No. 40 and No. 41) in both K&N Pro Series East and K&N Pro Series West.

The team returned for 2016.

In 2017, the team shut down because Ranier/Hillman and Miller part ways. Miller renamed the team to MDM Motorsports.

Austin Dillon, Landon Cassill, Ryan Preece, Kyle Benjamin, Travis Miller, Brian Wong, Corey LaJoie and Spencer Davis all drove for the team in K&N.

The team also fielded two part-time entries (the No. 8 and No. 28) in ARCA Racing Series' 2016 season, the team had 1 win with Brandon Jones at Michigan. The team also had 1 pole-position with Kyle Benjamin at Iowa.

Alongside Jones and Benjamin, Harrison Burton, Travis Miller, Matt Tifft and Michael Self also drove for the team in ARCA.
