= Travis Miller =

Travis Miller may refer to:

- Travis Miller (baseball) (born 1972), American baseball player
- Travis Miller (racing driver) (born 1988), American race car driver
- Lil Ugly Mane (born Travis Miller in 1984), American rapper and producer
