= Jeff Agnew =

American racing driver

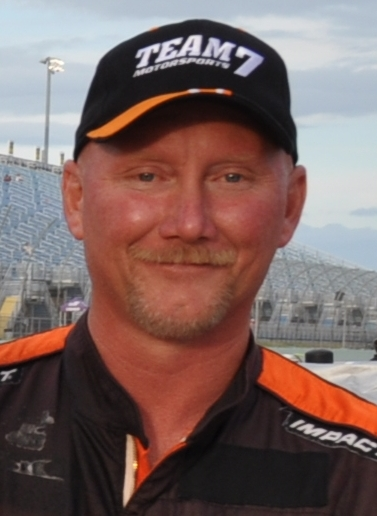
- Agnew at Homestead–Miami Speedway in 2012
- Born: Jeffrey Agnew; August 17, 1965 (age 61); Copper Hill, Virginia, U.S.

NASCAR FedEx Freight Truck Series career
- 29 races run over 3 years
- 2013 position: 23rd
- Best finish: 23rd (2013)
- First race: 2011 O'Reilly 200 (Bristol)
- Last race: 2013 Ford EcoBoost 200 (Homestead)
Wins	Top tens	Poles
0	0	0

Jeffrey Agnew (born August 17, 1965) is an American professional stock car racing driver. He last competed part-time in the NASCAR Camping World Truck Series, driving the No. 27 for Hillman Racing in 2013.

== Racing career ==
Agnew made his debut in racing in 1978 running late models, he competed against Darrell Waltrip and Bobby Allison in one race that year.

Agnew is most well known for his success as a competitor in the Hooters Pro Cup Series, where he was the champion of the 1998 and 2011 seasons. The 1998 championship came with future NASCAR Cup Series crew chief Darian Grubb serving in that same capacity for Agnew. He also won the 2003 Hooters Pro Cup Series regular season (competing only in the Northern Division races). Agnew ended his career in the series with twenty wins, 97 top-five and 153 top-ten finishes in 237 starts.

Agnew also captured six track titles, two each at Motor Mile Speedway, Lonesome Pine Raceway and Kingsport Speedway. He is listed fourth in Motor Mile Speedway late model all-time wins list with 48 wins.

In 2011, at the age of 45, he made his NASCAR debut, competing in three events in NASCAR Camping World Truck Series. He then competed in eleven events in the 2012 season and fifteen races in 2013, including a combined effort between Team 7 Motorsports and Hillman Racing. He ended his NASCAR career with 29 starts. His best finish was fourteenth at Martinsville Speedway in 2011.

== Motorsports career results ==
=== NASCAR ===
==== Camping World Truck Series ====
NASCAR Camping World Truck Series results
Year	Team	No.	Make	1	2	3	4	5	6	7	8	9	10	11	12	13	14	15	16	17	18	19	20	21	22	23	24	25	NCWTC	Pts	Ref
2011	Team 7 Motorsports	70	Chevy	DAY	PHO	DAR	MAR	NSH	DOV	CLT	KAN	TEX	KEN	IOW	NSH	IRP	POC	MCH	BRI; 28	ATL	CHI	NHA; 27	KEN	LVS	TAL	MAR; 14	TEX	HOM; DNQ	48th	63	
2012	Team 7 Motorsports	70	Chevy	DAY	MAR; 35	CAR; 27	KAN	CLT; DNQ	DOV; 21	TEX																			29th	204	
2012	SS-Green Light Racing	07	Chevy								KEN; 27	IOW; 21	CHI						BRI; 32	ATL	IOW	KEN; 17	LVS	TAL	MAR; 21	TEX; 25	PHO	HOM; 24	29th	204	
2012	SS-Green Light Racing	07	Toyota											POC; 31	MCH														29th	204	
2013	Hillman Racing	27	Chevy	DAY; 23	MAR; 23	CAR; 35	KAN; 23	CLT; 21	DOV; 23	TEX	KEN; 15	IOW; 20	ELD	POC; 23	MCH	BRI; 31	MSP	IOW; 30	CHI; 18	LVS	TAL; 28	MAR; 15	TEX	PHO	HOM; 18				23rd	314	
