= Joe Falk =

American automobile dealer, stock car racing team owner and stock car racer

- Born: January 30, 1951 (age 75); Chesapeake, Virginia, U.S.
- Achievements: 1976 Langley Speedway Late Model Track Champion

NASCAR O'Reilly Auto Parts Series career
- 1 race run over 1 year
- Best finish: 105th (1984)
- First race: 1984 Bobby Isaac Memorial 200 (Hickory)
Wins	Top tens	Poles
0	0	0

Joseph A. Falk (born January 30, 1951) is an American auto dealer and NASCAR Cup Series team owner, as well as a former stock car racing driver. He is the owner of Little Joe's Autos, an automobile dealership in the Virginia Tidewater.

== Driving career ==
Falk started his racing career at Langley Speedway, where he won the track's Late Model championship in 1976; he was also the winner of what some regard as "the [track's] best Late Model race of all time", in 1983.

Falk drove in one NASCAR sanctioned race at the 'national series' level, competing in the Busch Series (now O'Reilly Auto Parts Series) Bobby Isaac Memorial 200 at Hickory Motor Speedway in October 1984; he finished 17th after starting 23rd, driving a Pontiac for Bubba Nissen Racing.

== Team owner ==
Falk became a team owner in the NASCAR Winston Cup Series in 1997, partnered with Ron Neal to form LJ Racing, fielding the No. 91 Chevrolet; the team struggled, and utilized several drivers over the next three years before closing.

Falk returned to NASCAR team ownership in 2011, fielding the No. 50 Chevrolet under the LTD Powersports name.

For the 2012 season, Falk joined Hillman Racing, owned by former Cup Series crew chief and Germain Racing team manager Mike Hillman Sr., as a partial owner; the team attempted to qualify for the 2012 Daytona 500 with driver Michael Waltrip, but failed to make the race. Falk also co-owned Hillman Racing's Camping World Truck Series team. In April 2012, he acquired the assets of the former Richard Childress Racing No. 33 Chevrolet team, establishing Circle Sport; in 2013 he partnered with Hillman Racing once again to add Hillman's No. 40 Chevrolet to the team, running two cars in most Sprint Cup events starting mid-season.

After 2015, Falk and Hillman split due to financial issues. Falk took his half of the team and invested in Leavine Family Racing, forming Circle Sport – Leavine Family Racing. He was granted a charter by NASCAR for the new charter system, as the No. 33 had attempted every race between 2013 and 2015. This sparked a lawsuit between Hillman Racing and CSLFR, over whether Hillman or Falk owned the charter. According to reporter Bob Pockrass on Twitter on June 30, the suit was settled under undisclosed terms with Falk maintaining ownership of the Charter.

Before the race at Homestead-Miami Speedway, it was announced that Circle Sport Racing and Leavine Family Racing ended their partnership, because NASCAR rules stipulate that the No. 95 team using Falk's charter, counted as a lease, which, by rule, could only happen once every five years. The team eventually split, with Leavine Family Racing purchasing the charter of Tommy Baldwin Racing and Falk retaining his original charter. After rumors of possibly joining Richard Childress Racing in ownership or joining The Motorsports Group owned by Falk's lifelong friend Curtis Key, it was later confirmed on January 6 that Falk would partner with Key, forming Circle Sport – The Motorsports Group. Falk would be the listed owner of the No. 33 team while Key would work on the business side of the team. Since he couldn't lease his charter, Falk instead gave Curtis Key a percentage of the charter, allowing the merger to be official for 2017 and beyond.

CSTMG picked up Jeffrey Earnhardt as their driver for the 2017 Daytona 500. Following a good performance by Earnhardt in the race, it was announced that Earnhardt would be the full-time driver for the team. On road course races, the team hired Boris Said and Boris' longtime crew chief Frank Stoddard to run the No. 33.

At the end of the season, Circle Sport parted ways with The Motorsports Group. Falk & Circle Sport later formed a partnership with Go FAS Racing to field a part-time No. 33 and for Go FAS to use the No. 33 charter. Due to his partnership with Go FAS, a Ford team, this meant the end of Circle Sport's association with Richard Childress. Even though the No. 33 was expected to run at some point in 2018 with Joey Gase, it never came to fruition. However, Falk and Circle Sport remained partners with Go FAS in 2019, allowing the No. 32 to keep using the No. 33 charter. This partnership would last for three years, until Go FAS shut down at the end of 2020.

In late-2020, it was announced that Falk would partner with B. J. McLeod and Matt Tifft to field a Cup Series car full-time with Circle Sport's charter, and that Tifft would be involved in the ownership of the team. It was later announced the name of the team would be Live Fast Motorsports with Falk dropping the Circle Sport name.

== Motorsports career results ==
=== NASCAR ===
(key) (Bold – Pole position awarded by qualifying time. Italics – Pole position earned by points standings or practice time. * – Most laps led.)

==== Busch Series ====
NASCAR Busch Series results
Year	Team	No.	Make	1	2	3	4	5	6	7	8	9	10	11	12	13	14	15	16	17	18	19	20	21	22	23	24	25	26	27	28	29	NBSC	Pts	Ref
1984	Joe Falk	95	Pontiac	DAY	RCH	CAR	HCY	MAR	DAR	ROU	NSV	LGY	MLW	DOV	CLT	SBO	HCY	ROU	SBO	ROU	HCY	IRP	LGY	SBO	BRI	DAR	RCH	NWS	CLT	HCY; 17	CAR	MAR	105th	-	
