= Andy Petree =

American motorsports commentator, team owner and driver

- Born: Joseph Andrew Petree III; August 15, 1958 (age 68); Hickory, North Carolina, U.S.
- Awards: 1993, 1994 NASCAR Winston Cup Series Champion Crew Chief

NASCAR O'Reilly Auto Parts Series career
- 5 races run over 2 years
- Best finish: 60th (1988)
- First race: 1988 Commonwealth 200 (Richmond)
- Last race: 1994 Advance Auto 500 (Martinsville)
Wins	Top tens	Poles
0	0	0

NASCAR FedEx Freight Truck Series career
- 7 races run over 3 years
- Best finish: 50th (2003)
- First race: 2002 Advance Auto Parts 250 (Martinsville)
- Last race: 2004 Kroger 250 (Martinsville)
Wins	Top tens	Poles
0	1	0
- Statistics up to date as of March 8, 2012.

Joseph Andrew Petree III (born August 15, 1958) is an American former NASCAR crew chief, driver, team owner, and broadcaster who has worked as the rules analyst for Fox NASCAR. He used to be the Vice President of Competition at Richard Childress Racing. After racing for years at local short tracks (most notably Hickory Motor Speedway), Petree became part owner of the No. 32 Busch Series car for Dale Jarrett. By the age of 28, Petree was already a Winston Cup Series crew chief on the Leo Jackson racing team. That car was driven by the Bandit Harry Gant. Petree was a color commentator for ESPN and ABC's NASCAR coverage.

== Broadcasting career ==
On October 12, 2006, Petree was officially named a color commentator of the ESPN/ABC NASCAR broadcast team for their Nationwide and Cup Series coverage. Petree joined Rusty Wallace and Jerry Punch in the broadcast booth, with Jamie Little, Mike Massaro, Dave Burns, Vince Welch, and Allen Bestwick reporting from pit road. By 2011, Petree was the only member of the 2007 broadcast team still in the booth; until ESPN's final season of broadcasting NASCAR, he was joined by Bestwick and Dale Jarrett, with Wallace in the infield studio and Punch on pit road.

On February 10, 2015, Petree was hired by Fox NASCAR as a rules analyst. However, Petree didn't return to FOX for 2016.

== Motorsports career results ==
=== NASCAR ===
(key) (Bold – Pole position awarded by qualifying time. Italics – Pole position earned by points standings or practice time. * – Most laps led.)

==== Busch Series ====
NASCAR Busch Series results
Year	Team	No.	Make	1	2	3	4	5	6	7	8	9	10	11	12	13	14	15	16	17	18	19	20	21	22	23	24	25	26	27	28	29	30	NBSC	Pts	Ref
1988	G&G Racing	4	Olds	DAY	HCY	CAR	MAR	DAR	BRI	LNG	NZH	SBO	NSV	CLT	DOV	ROU	LAN	LVL	MYB	OXF	SBO	HCY	LNG	IRP	ROU	BRI	DAR	RCH; 36	DOV	MAR; 17	CLT		MAR; 30	60th	240	
1988	G&G Racing	4	Buick																													CAR; 22		60th	240	
1994	Dale Earnhardt, Inc.	3	Chevy	DAY	CAR	RCH	ATL	MAR	DAR	HCY	BRI	ROU	NHA	NZH	CLT	DOV	MYB	GLN	MLW	SBO	TAL	HCY	IRP	MCH	BRI	DAR	RCH	DOV	CLT	MAR; 16	CAR			79th	115	

==== Craftsman Truck Series ====
NASCAR Craftsman Truck Series results
Year	Team	No.	Make	1	2	3	4	5	6	7	8	9	10	11	12	13	14	15	16	17	18	19	20	21	22	23	24	25	NCTC	Pts	Ref
2002	Andy Petree Racing	33	Chevy	DAY	DAR	MAR; 31	GTY	PPR	DOV	TEX	MEM	MLW	KAN	KEN	NHA	MCH	IRP; 12	NSH	RCH	TEX	SBO	LVS	CAL	PHO	HOM				64th	202	
2003	Andy Petree Racing	33	Chevy	DAY	DAR	MMR; 14	MAR; 10	CLT	DOV	TEX	MEM	MLW	KAN	KEN	GTW	MCH	IRP; 20	NSH	BRI	RCH	NHA	CAL	LVS	SBO	TEX	MAR; 18	PHO	HOM	50th	467	
2004	Andy Petree Racing	33	Chevy	DAY	ATL	MAR; 18	MFD	CLT	DOV	TEX	MEM	MLW	KAN	KEN	GTW	MCH	IRP	NSH	BRI	RCH	NHA	LVS	CAL	TEX	MAR	PHO	DAR	HOM	87th	109	

==== Whelen Modified Tour ====
NASCAR Whelen Modified Tour results
Year	Car owner	No.	Make	1	2	3	4	5	6	7	8	9	10	11	12	13	14	15	16	NWMTC	Pts	Ref
2011	Andy Petree	5	Chevy	TMP	STA	STA	MND	TMP	NHA; 32	RIV	STA	NHA	BRI; 22	DEL	TMP	LRP	NHA	STA	TMP	39th	164	

=== ARCA Re/Max Series ===
(key) (Bold – Pole position awarded by qualifying time. Italics – Pole position earned by points standings or practice time. * – Most laps led. ** – All laps led.)

ARCA Re/Max Series results
Year	Team	No.	Make	1	2	3	4	5	6	7	8	9	10	11	12	13	14	15	16	17	18	19	20	21	22	23	24	25	ARMSC	Pts	Ref
2001	Andy Petree Racing	15	Chevy	DAY	NSH	WIN	SLM	GTY	KEN	CLT	KAN	MCH	POC	MEM	GLN	KEN	MCH	POC	NSH	ISF	CHI	DSF; 9	SLM	TOL	BLN	CLT	TAL	ATL	118th	195	
2002	Andy Petree Racing	15	Chevy	DAY	ATL	NSH	SLM	KEN	CLT	KAN	POC	MCH	TOL	SBO	KEN	BLN	POC	NSH	ISF	WIN	DSF; 33	CHI	SLM	TAL	CLT				165th	65	
