= 2015 Bank of America 500 =

Race details
- Race 30 of 36 in the 2015 NASCAR Sprint Cup Series
- The 2015 Bank of America 500 program cover, featuring Jeff Gordon. Artwork by Sam Bass. "Jeff's Last Ride".
- Date: October 11, 2015
- Location: Charlotte Motor Speedway in Concord, North Carolina
- Course: Permanent racing facility
- Course length: 1.5 miles (2.4 km)
- Distance: 334 laps, 501 mi (801.6 km)
- Weather: Clear blue skies with a temperature of 64 °F (18 °C); wind out of the north/northeast at 6 mph (9.7 km/h)
- Average speed: 139.760 mph (224.922 km/h)

Pole position
Driver	Matt Kenseth	Joe Gibbs Racing
- Time: 27.759

Most laps led
Driver	Joey Logano	Team Penske
- Laps: 227

Winner
No. 22	Joey Logano	Team Penske

Television in the United States
- Network: NBCSN
- Announcers: Rick Allen, Jeff Burton and Steve Letarte
- Nielsen ratings: 1.4/3 (Overnight); 1.4/3 (Final); 2.7 million viewers

Radio in the United States
- Radio: PRN
- Booth announcers: Doug Rice, Mark Garrow and Wendy Venturini
- Turn announcers: Rob Albright (1 & 2) and Pat Patterson (3 & 4)

The 2015 Bank of America 500 was a NASCAR Sprint Cup Series race scheduled to be held on October 10, 2015 at Charlotte Motor Speedway in Concord, North Carolina but pushed ahead to October 11 due to rain. Contested over 334 laps on the 1.5 mile (2.4 km) intermediate speedway, it was the 30th race of the 2015 NASCAR Sprint Cup Series season, fourth race of the Chase and first race of the Contender Round. Joey Logano won the race, his fourth of the season. Kevin Harvick finished second. Martin Truex Jr., Denny Hamlin and Kurt Busch rounded out the top-five.

Matt Kenseth won the pole for the race and led 72 laps before retiring from the race after slamming the wall late in the event and finished 42nd. Logano led a race high of 227 on his way to winning the race. The race had 14 lead changes among 10 different drivers, as well as nine caution flag periods for 44 laps.

This was the 12th career win for Joey Logano, fourth of the season, first at Charlotte Motor Speedway and third at the track for Team Penske. He jumped to the top of the points standings with a six–point lead over Harvick. Despite being the winning manufacturer, Ford left Charlotte trailing Chevrolet by 67–points third in the manufacturer standings.

The Bank of America 500 was carried by NBC Sports on the cable/satellite NBCSN network for the American television audience. The radio broadcast for the race was carried by the Performance Racing Network and Sirius XM NASCAR Radio.

== Report ==
=== Background ===
An aerial view of Charlotte Motor Speedway

Charlotte Motor Speedway (known as Lowe's Motor Speedway from 1999 to 2009 due to sponsorship reasons) is a 1.500 mi (2.414 km) quad-oval intermediate speedway in Concord, North Carolina. Matt Kenseth entered tied for the points lead with Joey Logano, Denny Hamlin, Carl Edwards, Martin Truex Jr., Kurt Busch, Jeff Gordon, Brad Keselowski, Kyle Busch, Ryan Newman, Dale Earnhardt Jr. and Kevin Harvick.

==== Restart zone ====
The restart zone was expanded from 90 ft (27 m) to 180 ft (55 m) and lines were painted across the track to indicate the zone.

==== Entry list ====
The entry list for the Bank of America 500 was released on Monday, October 5 at 11:10 a.m. Eastern time. Forty-five cars were entered for the race. All but Ryan Blaney and Michael McDowell were entered in the previous week's race at Dover.

No.	Driver	Team	Manufacturer
1	Jamie McMurray	Chip Ganassi Racing	Chevrolet
2	Brad Keselowski (PC3)	Team Penske	Ford
3	Austin Dillon	Richard Childress Racing	Chevrolet
4	Kevin Harvick (PC1)	Stewart–Haas Racing	Chevrolet
5	Kasey Kahne	Hendrick Motorsports	Chevrolet
6	Trevor Bayne	Roush Fenway Racing	Ford
7	Alex Bowman	Tommy Baldwin Racing	Chevrolet
9	Sam Hornish Jr.	Richard Petty Motorsports	Ford
10	Danica Patrick	Stewart–Haas Racing	Chevrolet
11	Denny Hamlin	Joe Gibbs Racing	Toyota
13	Casey Mears	Germain Racing	Chevrolet
14	Tony Stewart (PC4)	Stewart–Haas Racing	Chevrolet
15	Clint Bowyer	Michael Waltrip Racing	Toyota
16	Greg Biffle	Roush Fenway Racing	Ford
17	Ricky Stenhouse Jr.	Roush Fenway Racing	Ford
18	Kyle Busch	Joe Gibbs Racing	Toyota
19	Carl Edwards	Joe Gibbs Racing	Toyota
20	Matt Kenseth (PC6)	Joe Gibbs Racing	Toyota
21	Ryan Blaney (i)	Wood Brothers Racing	Ford
22	Joey Logano	Team Penske	Ford
23	Jeb Burton (R)	BK Racing	Toyota
24	Jeff Gordon (PC7)	Hendrick Motorsports	Chevrolet
26	J. J. Yeley (i)	BK Racing	Toyota
27	Paul Menard	Richard Childress Racing	Chevrolet
31	Ryan Newman	Richard Childress Racing	Chevrolet
32	Josh Wise	Go FAS Racing	Ford
33	Alex Kennedy (R)	Hillman-Circle Sport LLC	Chevrolet
34	Brett Moffitt (R)	Front Row Motorsports	Ford
35	Cole Whitt	Front Row Motorsports	Ford
38	David Gilliland	Front Row Motorsports	Ford
40	Landon Cassill (i)	Hillman-Circle Sport LLC	Chevrolet
41	Kurt Busch (PC5)	Stewart–Haas Racing	Chevrolet
42	Kyle Larson	Chip Ganassi Racing	Chevrolet
43	Aric Almirola	Richard Petty Motorsports	Ford
46	Michael Annett	HScott Motorsports	Chevrolet
47	A. J. Allmendinger	JTG Daugherty Racing	Chevrolet
48	Jimmie Johnson (PC2)	Hendrick Motorsports	Chevrolet
51	Justin Allgaier	HScott Motorsports	Chevrolet
55	David Ragan	Michael Waltrip Racing	Toyota
62	Timmy Hill (i)	Premium Motorsports	Chevrolet
78	Martin Truex Jr.	Furniture Row Racing	Chevrolet
83	Matt DiBenedetto (R)	BK Racing	Toyota
88	Dale Earnhardt Jr.	Hendrick Motorsports	Chevrolet
95	Michael McDowell	Leavine Family Racing	Ford
98	Reed Sorenson	Premium Motorsports	Ford
Official entry list

Key	Meaning
(R)	Rookie
(i)	Ineligible for points
(PC#)	Past champions provisional

== Practice ==
=== First practice ===
Kevin Harvick was the fastest in the first practice session with a time of 27.907 and a speed of 193.500 mph (311.408 km/h).

Pos	No.	Driver	Team	Manufacturer	Time	Speed
1	4	Kevin Harvick	Stewart–Haas Racing	Chevrolet	27.907	193.500
2	20	Matt Kenseth	Joe Gibbs Racing	Toyota	27.995	192.892
3	16	Greg Biffle	Roush Fenway Racing	Ford	27.996	192.885
Official first practice results

=== Second practice ===
Kurt Busch was the fastest in the second practice session with a time of 28.606 and a speed of 188.772 mph (303.799 km/h).

Pos	No.	Driver	Team	Manufacturer	Time	Speed
1	41	Kurt Busch	Stewart–Haas Racing	Chevrolet	28.606	188.772
2	19	Carl Edwards	Joe Gibbs Racing	Toyota	28.629	188.620
3	31	Ryan Newman	Richard Childress Racing	Chevrolet	28.780	187.630
Official second practice results

=== Final practice ===
Kyle Busch was the fastest in the final practice session with a time of 28.518 and a speed of 189.354 mph (304.736 km/h).

Pos	No.	Driver	Team	Manufacturer	Time	Speed
1	18	Kyle Busch	Joe Gibbs Racing	Toyota	28.518	189.354
2	41	Kurt Busch	Stewart–Haas Racing	Chevrolet	28.572	188.996
3	22	Joey Logano	Team Penske	Ford	28.646	188.508
Official final practice results

== Qualifying ==
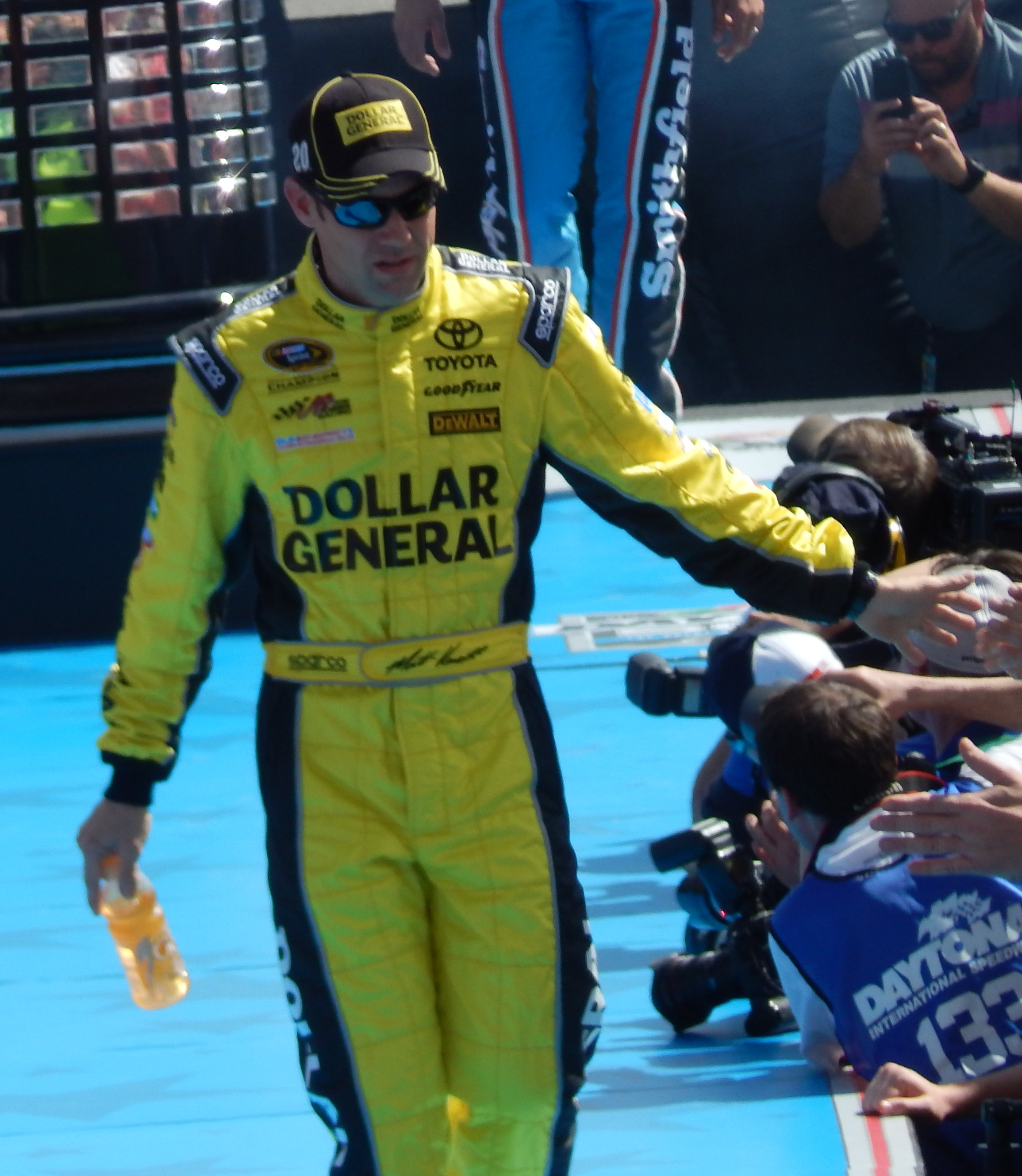
Matt Kenseth scored the pole for the race.

Matt Kenseth won the pole for the race with a time of 27.759 and a speed of 194.532 mph (313.069 km/h). He said that his team had "worked on qualifying all day. Obviously our goal was to come here and try to sit on the pole but to qualify well, and we accomplished that. They brought a real fast car here in the spring. Jason did a great job with our qualifying setup in the spring. We came here with the relatively same stuff. We’re just trying to make our stuff better.” Kyle Busch, after qualifying second, said that he liked "coming to Charlotte. This is certainly a good track for me. We look forward to Saturday night being another good night for us. Adam (Stevens) and the guys made did a great job making some good adjustments for qualifying there."

=== Qualifying results ===
Pos	No.	Driver	Team	Manufacturer	R1	R2	R3
1	20	Matt Kenseth	Joe Gibbs Racing	Toyota	28.072	27.904	27.759
2	18	Kyle Busch	Joe Gibbs Racing	Toyota	28.057	28.074	27.957
3	22	Joey Logano	Team Penske	Ford	28.340	27.962	27.976
4	16	Greg Biffle	Roush Fenway Racing	Ford	28.351	28.134	27.987
5	11	Denny Hamlin	Joe Gibbs Racing	Toyota	28.379	28.128	27.992
6	41	Kurt Busch	Stewart–Haas Racing	Chevrolet	28.220	28.171	28.036
7	48	Jimmie Johnson	Hendrick Motorsports	Chevrolet	28.266	28.176	28.051
8	19	Carl Edwards	Joe Gibbs Racing	Toyota	28.161	28.181	28.061
9	43	Aric Almirola	Richard Petty Motorsports	Ford	28.381	28.142	28.092
10	31	Ryan Newman	Richard Childress Racing	Chevrolet	28.270	28.142	28.119
11	4	Kevin Harvick	Stewart–Haas Racing	Chevrolet	28.025	27.980	28.211
12	88	Dale Earnhardt Jr.	Hendrick Motorsports	Chevrolet	28.049	27.979	28.328
13	2	Brad Keselowski	Team Penske	Ford	28.067	28.181	—
14	3	Austin Dillon	Richard Childress Racing	Chevrolet	28.275	28.183	—
15	78	Martin Truex Jr.	Furniture Row Racing	Chevrolet	28.362	28.264	—
16	21	Ryan Blaney (i)	Wood Brothers Racing	Ford	28.186	28.264	—
17	47	A. J. Allmendinger	JTG Daugherty Racing	Chevrolet	28.436	28.286	—
18	9	Sam Hornish Jr.	Richard Petty Motorsports	Ford	28.311	28.299	—
19	55	David Ragan	Michael Waltrip Racing	Toyota	28.380	28.349	—
20	5	Kasey Kahne	Hendrick Motorsports	Chevrolet	28.220	28.356	—
21	13	Casey Mears	Germain Racing	Chevrolet	28.390	28.364	—
22	24	Jeff Gordon	Hendrick Motorsports	Chevrolet	28.268	28.429	—
23	15	Clint Bowyer	Michael Waltrip Racing	Toyota	28.430	28.475	—
24	10	Danica Patrick	Stewart–Haas Racing	Chevrolet	28.386	28.631	—
25	17	Ricky Stenhouse Jr.	Roush Fenway Racing	Ford	28.436	—	—
26	27	Paul Menard	Richard Childress Racing	Chevrolet	28.449	—	—
27	7	Alex Bowman	Tommy Baldwin Racing	Chevrolet	28.538	—	—
28	51	Justin Allgaier	HScott Motorsports	Chevrolet	28.626	—	—
29	38	David Gilliland	Front Row Motorsports	Ford	28.644	—	—
30	1	Jamie McMurray	Chip Ganassi Racing	Chevrolet	28.647	—	—
31	42	Kyle Larson	Chip Ganassi Racing	Chevrolet	28.749	—	—
32	95	Michael McDowell	Leavine Family Racing	Ford	28.825	—	—
33	6	Trevor Bayne	Roush Fenway Racing	Ford	28.839	—	—
34	40	Landon Cassill (i)	Hillman-Circle Sport LLC	Chevrolet	28.843	—	—
35	26	J. J. Yeley (i)	BK Racing	Toyota	28.844	—	—
36	14	Tony Stewart	Stewart–Haas Racing	Chevrolet	28.915	—	—
37	34	Brett Moffitt (R)	Front Row Motorsports	Ford	28.941	—	—
38	46	Michael Annett	HScott Motorsports	Chevrolet	28.942	—	—
39	35	Cole Whitt	Front Row Motorsports	Ford	29.023	—	—
40	83	Matt DiBenedetto (R)	BK Racing	Toyota	29.066	—	—
41	23	Jeb Burton (R)	BK Racing	Toyota	29.158	—	—
42	98	Reed Sorenson	Premium Motorsports	Ford	29.318	—	—
43	33	Alex Kennedy (R)	Hillman-Circle Sport LLC	Chevrolet	29.642	—	—
Failed to qualify
44	32	Josh Wise	Go FAS Racing	Ford	29.152	—	—
45	62	Timmy Hill (i)	Premium Motorsports	Chevrolet	29.442	—	—
Official qualifying results

== Race ==
=== First half ===
==== Start ====
The race was scheduled to start at 7:21 p.m., but rain forced the race to be pushed to the next day. Under clear blue North Carolina skies, Matt Kenseth led the field to the green flag at 12:32 p.m. The field didn't make it half a lap before debris brought out the first caution of the race. The back of the field accordioned back and Jeb Burton rammed into the rear of Cole Whitt. Kyle Busch was able to take the lead before the caution flew.

The race restarted on lap 5. Matt Kenseth drove by Busch to take the lead. He pulled out to a one-second lead over Joey Logano after 10 laps. The second caution of the race flew on lap 26. This was a scheduled competition caution due to overnight rain. J. J. Yeley was tagged for his crew being over the wall too soon and restarted the race from the tail-end of the field.

The race restarted on lap 31. Yeley was black-flagged for unapproved adjustments and forced to come to pit road and fix the adjustment. Kasey Kahne was running 12th when he made an unscheduled stop on lap 42 after brushing the wall in turn 1. He rejoined the race in 41st two laps down. The third caution of the race flew on lap 61 for a single-car wreck on the backstretch. Rounding turn 2, Kahne suffered a right-front tire blowout and slammed the wall. He said that he didn't understand "why either one of those tires went down. Obviously, we were doing something wrong to have two tire failures like that. It’s discouraging, but that’s the way it goes.” He went on to finish 43rd. Greg Biffle was tagged for speeding on pit road and restarted the race from the tail-end of the field.

The race restarted on lap 66. Carl Edwards tapped the back of Dale Earnhardt Jr., got him loose and sent him into the wall on lap 70. Eventually, Earnhardt cut down his right-front tire, rode the wall and brought out the fourth caution of the race on lap 75. Speaking on the incident, he said that Edwards "got a great run on us and drove down into one and got in the back of us a little bit. I don’t know if I cut him off or not. But he drove in there pretty hard and ran over the left rear quarter panel of the car and got in the fence." Joey Logano opted not to pit under the caution and assumed the lead.

==== Second quarter ====
The race restarted on lap 81. Austin Dillon commenced a cycle of green flag stops pitting on lap 121. Logano hit pit road the next lap and handed the lead to Jimmie Johnson. He pitted on lap 124 and gave the lead to Kyle Larson. He pitted on lap 127 and surrendered the lead to Carl Edwards. He pitted the next lap and the lead cycled back to Joey Logano.

Debris on the backstretch brought out the fifth caution of the race on lap 167.

=== Second half ===
==== Halfway ====
"We all hit the wall. I hit the wall, Brad hit the wall. Then we went another lap and I pitted and a bunch of other guys hit the wall. There was oil down there. It wasn’t Speedi Dri. I’ve raced this for 20 years. I know what oil and Speedi Dri is. We hit fluid and flew into the freaking wall hard. That’s not Speedi Dri. It was oil up there. There were some shadows cast by them billboards across the track and that may have made it difficult for them to see. Justin blew a hose. He didn’t knock a hole in the bottom of the engine that would just leave a track of oil. He blew a hose or something that is going to spray oil and throw oil all about the race track and up the race track. Maybe it was two-and-a-half car lengths wide how much oil was on the track. You can put it where the car went. You got to get out there maybe and feel around, get your hands on the track."

— Dale Earnhardt Jr. speaking about the oil on the track after the race

The race restarted on lap 174. The sixth caution of the race flew on lap 177 after Matt Kenseth made contact with the wall in turn 4. He said that his situation "just kind of snowballed, you know. We were real fast out front. We were kind of tight in traffic and got behind pitting, and then I missed the pit stall tryng [sic] to come around the 21 (Ryan Blaney) and had to back up in the pit, and that put us back there, so just kind of snowballed. But with Ryan (Newman), I honestly don’t know. I’ve got to look at it. He went up like I thought he was broke, so I went up through the middle, and I thought I left him plenty of room and then next thing I know, I was pointed at the fence.”

The race restarted on lap 182. The seventh caution of the race flew the same lap after Justin Allgaier blew his engine in turn 1.

The race restarted on lap 190. Fluid in turn 2 brought out the eighth caution of the race on lap 195. Following the race, Dale Earnhardt Jr. elaborated on the oil in turn 2. After deciding to hit pit road at the last second, Kyle Larson got turned by Kyle Busch who decided not to pit at the last second. Larson said that he was told "to do what everybody around me was doing. The No. 22 (Logano) was staying out, so I was committed to staying out. (But) as soon as I turned right to stay out, they said ‘pit, pit, pit.’ I hung a left, and Kyle was there.” Busch said that he didn't "know what happened. My guys don’t deserve to be put in these situations year in and year out, but we are for some reason. It’s tough, but we’re going to have to battle back with what we’ve got." Both were tagged for commitment violations as they both hit the commitment cone and were forced to restart the race from the tail-end of the field.

The race restarted on lap 201. Matt Kenseth made contact with another car on the restart and made an unscheduled stop to fix the right-front wheel well. To add insult to injury, he was black-flagged for having too many crew members over the wall and was forced to serve a drive-through penalty. Kurt Busch kicked off a cycle of green flag stops on lap 231. Logano pitted on lap 232 and gave the lead to Austin Dillon. He pitted the next lap and gave the lead to Jeff Gordon. He pitted on lap 234 and gave the lead to Clint Bowyer. He pitted the next lap and handed the lead to Sam Hornish Jr. The ninth caution of the race flew with 95 laps to go for a single-car wreck in turn 3. Matt Kenseth suffered a right-front tire blowout and slammed the wall. He said that he's taking the Contender Round "one race at a time to be honest with you. I mean, you do the best you can every week and if this is the best I can do it’s amazing I have a job. These are never the kind of days you want to have for sure, but it’s just one of those days. We shouldn’t have ever been back there to start with. My mistakes and they cost us today. So we’ll just move on from this and get ready for Kansas.” Hornish pitted under the caution and handed the lead back to Joey Logano.

==== Fourth quarter ====
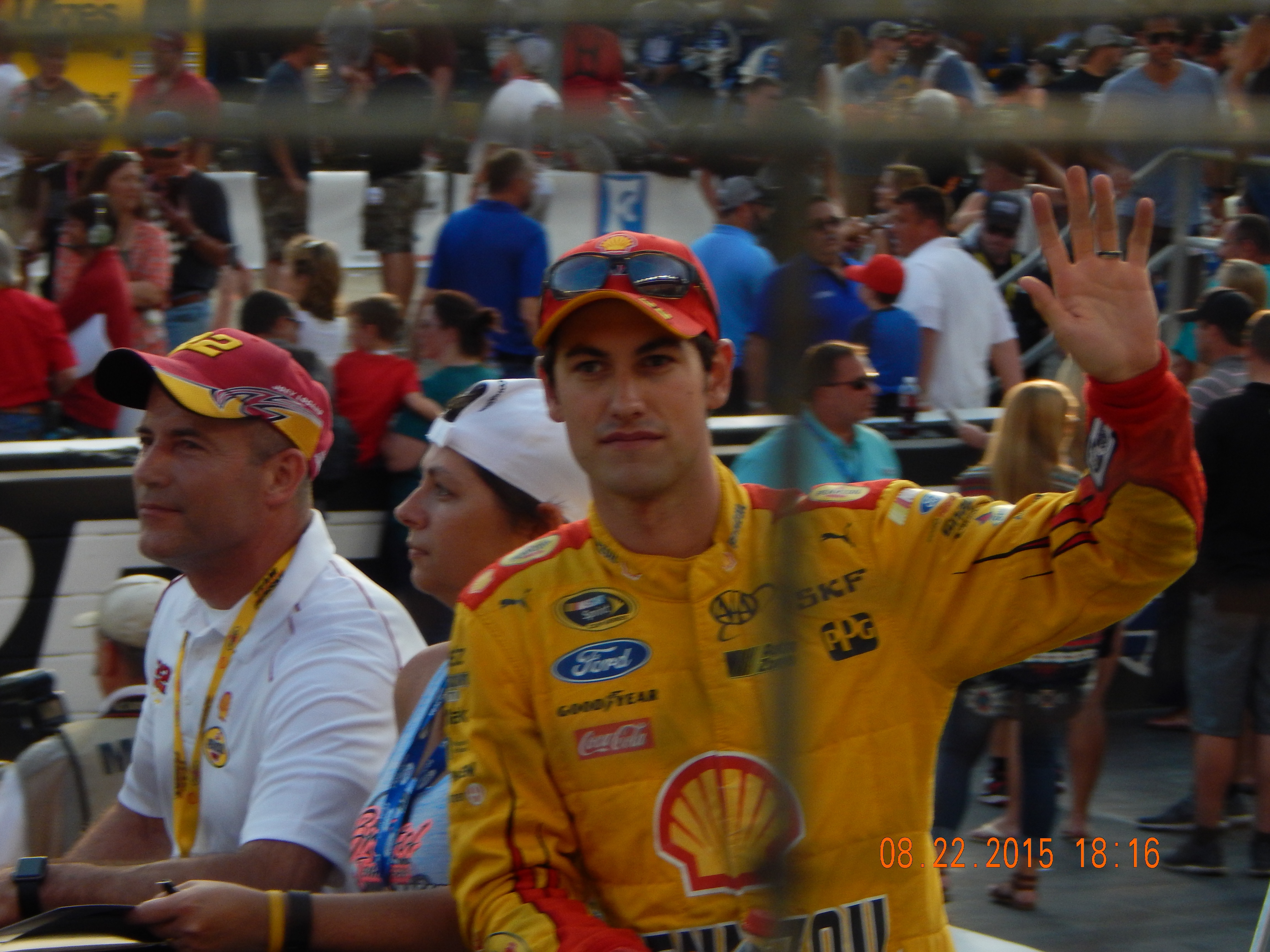
Joey Logano, seen here at Bristol, scored his 12th career victory at Charlotte.

The race restarted with 88 laps to go. Jimmie Johnson was running in the top-five when his engine blew up on the backstretch with 77 laps to go. With 65 laps remaining, Kevin Harvick began reeling in Joey Logano. Martin Truex Jr. kicked off the final round of green flag stops with 52 laps to go. Joey Logano made his final stop with 50 laps to go and handed the lead to Sam Hornish Jr. He made his final stop with 34 laps to go and the lead cycled back to Logano.

He continued to maintain a 1.5 to two second lead over Kevin Harvick with 10 laps to go. He continued to maintain that gap as he scored his 12th career victory.

== Post-race ==
=== Driver comments ===
After the race, Logano said that his team "had a great car. Todd Gordon and this Shell/Pennzoil team, all of Team Penske, you always want to win it. Charlotte is everybody’s home turf and you want to make it happen here." He also added that the win "makes Talladega way easier. I know that’s on everyone’s mind when this round starts and last year we won Kansas when it was the first race of this round and now we were able to get it this time at Charlotte. We’ll get lots of sleep here the next couple of weeks.”

Harvick said that he "thought things went well. The guys did a great job on pit road and we were able to capitalize with their solid day and gaining track position. Car wasn't great all weekend but we were able to make headway on it and make gains and to do the things we needed to do to make it better. In the end that's what you want to do on a day like today, and we made a really good day out of it. Obviously you want to win, but with so many guys having trouble you want to capitalize on a top five run, too.”

Following a third–place finish, Truex said that this race "was honestly the worst weekend we’ve had all season long as far as how I felt about the race car. I thought after practice we’d be lucky to run 15th. So proud of (crew chief) Cole (Pearn) and my engineers and just everybody for sticking with it, and having a good game plan. You know, we had a good car today. We fought track position all day but once we got up towards the front we had good speed.”

Following his eighth–place finish, Gordon said that he "couldn't be happier with the entire effort that we put out there. We made some great adjustments to get us back in this thing. I'm real happy with eighth. The problem is you've got six of the guys we're racing in the championship right there ahead of us. But we didn't lose much to them and I thought it was a really strong effort."

=== Oil on the track ===
"Under any caution and condition, we obviously send out all the safety equipment to look and see if there is any oil from their perspective on the track. We did that in this case. We had Brett Bodine run through it multiple times and confirm back up to race control that the track was in good shape to go ahead and restart. Hopefully, there wasn’t any. We go out there and we go check and did our process multiple times and they did not see any. Ultimately, we’re not in the car and driving the car. From our view, the race was in good shape to get restarted and it always has to be before we go back green. That's where we were and felt like we did everything we could to ensure that the race track was in a safe condition."

— Steve O'Donnell, NASCAR executive vice-president and chief racing development officer, speaking on the oil cleanup on Sirius XM NASCAR Radio

Kyle Busch and Dale Earnhardt Jr. were critical of NASCAR's cleanup effort of the oil following Justin Allgaier's engine expiration on lap 182. Busch sarcastically thanked NASCAR for the cleanup job.

In his weekly appearance on the Sirius XM NASCAR Radio program The Morning Drive, NASCAR Executive Vice-President and Chief Racing Development Officer Steve O'Donnell told Mike Bagley and Pete Pistone that the officials in the tower didn't see the oil and that he couldn't "debate Kyle and (Earnhardt)[.] They’re in the race cars. If they say they hit it, it’s not something that we saw out there. We’ll continue to talk to them and see what maybe we can improve on in the future. We had personnel even out on the track, getting down on almost their hands and knees to make sure there wasn’t any."

== Race results ==
Pos	No.	Driver	Team	Manufacturer	Laps	Points
1	22	Joey Logano	Team Penske	Ford	334	48
2	4	Kevin Harvick	Stewart–Haas Racing	Chevrolet	334	42
3	78	Martin Truex Jr.	Furniture Row Racing	Chevrolet	334	41
4	11	Denny Hamlin	Joe Gibbs Racing	Toyota	334	40
5	41	Kurt Busch	Stewart–Haas Racing	Chevrolet	334	39
6	19	Carl Edwards	Joe Gibbs Racing	Toyota	334	39
7	3	Austin Dillon	Richard Childress Racing	Chevrolet	334	38
8	24	Jeff Gordon	Hendrick Motorsports	Chevrolet	334	37
9	2	Brad Keselowski	Team Penske	Ford	334	35
10	43	Aric Almirola	Richard Petty Motorsports	Ford	334	34
11	15	Clint Bowyer	Michael Waltrip Racing	Toyota	334	34
12	1	Jamie McMurray	Chip Ganassi Racing	Chevrolet	334	32
13	17	Ricky Stenhouse Jr.	Roush Fenway Racing	Ford	334	31
14	21	Ryan Blaney (i)	Wood Brothers Racing	Ford	334	0
15	31	Ryan Newman	Richard Childress Racing	Chevrolet	334	29
16	47	A. J. Allmendinger	JTG Daugherty Racing	Chevrolet	334	28
17	9	Sam Hornish Jr.	Richard Petty Motorsports	Ford	333	28
18	13	Casey Mears	Germain Racing	Chevrolet	333	26
19	10	Danica Patrick	Stewart–Haas Racing	Chevrolet	333	25
20	18	Kyle Busch	Joe Gibbs Racing	Toyota	333	25
21	42	Kyle Larson	Chip Ganassi Racing	Chevrolet	333	24
22	6	Trevor Bayne	Roush Fenway Racing	Ford	332	22
23	40	Landon Cassill (i)	Hillman-Circle Sport LLC	Chevrolet	332	0
24	16	Greg Biffle	Roush Fenway Racing	Ford	331	20
25	46	Michael Annett	HScott Motorsports	Chevrolet	331	19
26	14	Tony Stewart	Stewart–Haas Racing	Chevrolet	331	18
27	38	David Gilliland	Front Row Motorsports	Ford	330	17
28	88	Dale Earnhardt Jr.	Hendrick Motorsports	Chevrolet	330	16
29	83	Matt DiBenedetto (R)	BK Racing	Toyota	330	15
30	34	Brett Moffitt (R)	Front Row Motorsports	Chevrolet	330	14
31	95	Michael McDowell	Leavine Family Racing	Ford	329	13
32	7	Alex Bowman	Tommy Baldwin Racing	Chevrolet	329	12
33	26	J. J. Yeley (i)	BK Racing	Toyota	328	0
34	33	Alex Kennedy (R)	Hillman-Circle Sport LLC	Chevrolet	326	10
35	98	Reed Sorenson	Premium Motorsports	Ford	325	9
36	27	Paul Menard	Richard Childress Racing	Chevrolet	325	8
37	55	David Ragan	Michael Waltrip Racing	Toyota	289	7
38	35	Cole Whitt	Front Row Motorsports	Ford	262	6
39	48	Jimmie Johnson	Hendrick Motorsports	Chevrolet	257	6
40	51	Justin Allgaier	HScott Motorsports	Chevrolet	251	4
41	23	Jeb Burton (R)	BK Racing	Toyota	244	3
42	20	Matt Kenseth	Joe Gibbs Racing	Chevrolet	236	3
43	5	Kasey Kahne	Hendrick Motorsports	Chevrolet	58	1
Official Bank of America 500 results

=== Race statistics ===
- 14 lead changes among 10 different drivers
- 9 cautions for 44 laps
- Time of race: 3 hours, 35 minutes, 5 seconds
- Average speed: 139.760 mph (224.922 km/h)
- Joey Logano took home $347,373 in winnings.

Lap leaders
Laps	Leader
1-4	Kyle Busch
5-76	Matt Kenseth
77-121	Joey Logano
122-123	Jimmie Johnson
124-126	Kyle Larson
127	Carl Edwards
128-231	Joey Logano
232	Austin Dillon
233	Jeff Gordon
234	Clint Bowyer
235-241	Sam Hornish Jr.
242-284	Joey Logano
285-299	Sam Hornish Jr.
300-334	Joey Logano

Total laps led
Leader	Laps
Joey Logano	227
Matt Kenseth	72
Sam Hornish Jr.	22
Kyle Busch	4
Kyle Larson	3
Jimmie Johnson	2
Carl Edwards	1
Austin Dillon	1
Jeff Gordon	1
Clint Bowyer	1

==== Race awards ====
- Coors Light Pole Award: Matt Kenseth (27.759, 194.532 mph (313.069 km/h)
- 3M Lap Leader: Joey Logano (227 laps)
- American Ethanol Green Flag Restart Award: Joey Logano
- Duralast Brakes "Bake In The Race" Award: Kyle Busch
- Freescale "Wide Open": Kevin Harvick
- Ingersoll Rand Power Move: Aric Almirola (2 positions)
- MAHLE Clevite Engine Builder of the Race: Roush-Yates Engines, #22
- Mobil 1 Driver of the Race: Joey Logano (146.4 driver rating)
- Moog Steering and Suspension Problem Solver of The Race: Jeff Gordon (crew chief Alan Gustafson (–0.053 seconds))
- NASCAR Sprint Cup Leader Bonus: Joey Logano, ($20,000)
- Sherwin-Williams Fastest Lap: Matt Kenseth (Lap 6, 28.246, 191.178 mph (307.671 km/h))
- Sunoco Rookie of The Race: Matt DiBenedetto

== Media ==
=== Television ===
NBCSN covered the race on the television side. Rick Allen, three–time Charlotte winner Jeff Burton and Steve Letarte had the call in the booth for the race. Dave Burns, Mike Massaro, Marty Snider and Kelli Stavast handled pit road on the television side.

NBCSN
Booth announcers	Pit reporters
Lap-by-lap: Rick Allen; Color-commentator: Jeff Burton; Color-commentator: Steve Letarte	Dave Burns; Mike Massaro; Marty Snider; Kelli Stavast

=== Radio ===
PRN had the radio call for the race, which was simulcast on Sirius XM NASCAR Radio. Doug Rice, Mark Garrow and Wendy Venturini called the race from the booth when the field was racing down the front stretch. Rob Albright called the race from a platform outside turn 2 when the field was racing through turns 1 and 2. Pat Patterson called the race from atop the turn 4 stands when the field was racing through turns 3 and 4. Brad Gillie, Brett McMillan, Jim Noble and Steve Richards handled pit road on the radio side.

PRN
Booth announcers	Turn announcers	Pit reporters
Lead announcer: Doug Rice; Announcer: Mark Garrow; Announcer: Wendy Venturini	Turns 1 & 2: Rob Albright; Turns 3 & 4: Pat Patterson	Brad Gillie; Brett McMillan; Jim Noble; Steve Richards

== Standings after the race ==
Drivers' Championship standings

	Pos	Driver	Points
1	1	Joey Logano	3,048
10	2	Kevin Harvick	3,042 (–6)
2	3	Martin Truex Jr.	3,041 (–7)
1	4	Denny Hamlin	3,040 (–8)
1	5	Kurt Busch	3,039 (–9)
2	6	Carl Edwards	3,039 (–9)
	7	Jeff Gordon	3,037 (–11)
	8	Brad Keselowski	3,035 (–13)
1	9	Ryan Newman	3,029 (–19)
1	10	Kyle Busch	3,025 (–23)
	11	Dale Earnhardt Jr.	3,016 (–32)
11	12	Matt Kenseth	3,003 (–45)
	13	Jamie McMurray	2,130 (–918)
	14	Jimmie Johnson	2,092 (–956)
	15	Paul Menard	2,083 (–965)
	16	Clint Bowyer	2,082 (–966)

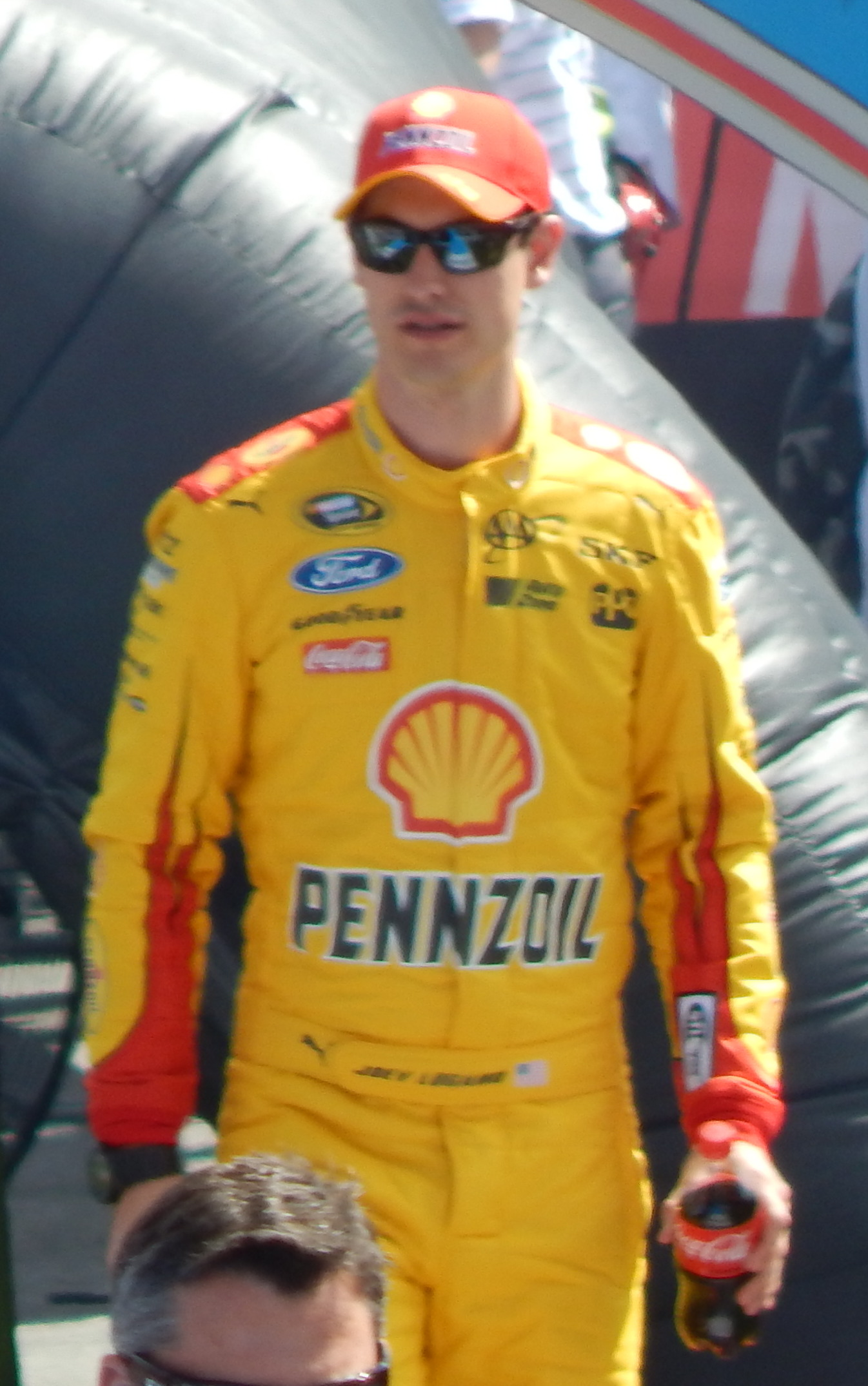
Joey Logano left Charlotte with a six–point lead over Kevin Harvick.

Manufacturers' Championship standings

Pos	Manufacturer	Points
1	Chevrolet	1,315
2	Toyota	1,268 (–47)
3	Ford	1,248 (–67)

- Note: Only the first sixteen positions are included for the driver standings.

Previous race: 2015 AAA 400	Sprint Cup Series; 2015 season	Next race: 2015 Hollywood Casino 400
