= 2015 AAA 400 =

Race details
- Race 29 of 36 in the 2015 NASCAR Sprint Cup Series
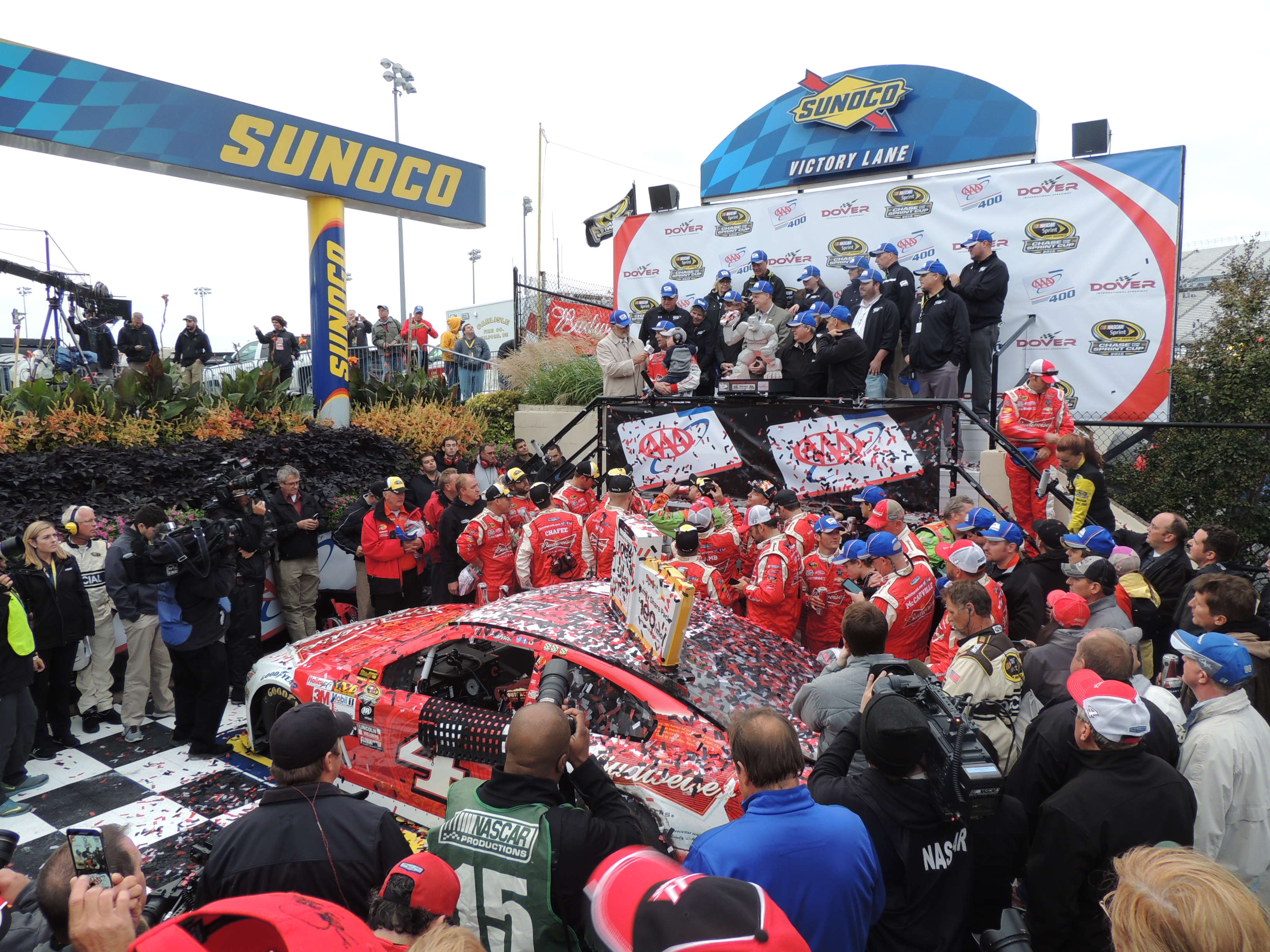
- Kevin Harvick won the race
- Date: October 4, 2015
- Location: Dover International Speedway in Dover, Delaware
- Course: Permanent racing facility
- Course length: 1 miles (1.6 km)
- Distance: 400 laps, 400 mi (640 km)
- Weather: Cloudy with a temperature of 62 °F (17 °C); wind out of the northeast at 21 mph (34 km/h)
- Average speed: 119.870 mph (192.912 km/h)

Pole position
Driver	Matt Kenseth	Joe Gibbs Racing
- Time: Qualifying rained out

Most laps led
Driver	Kevin Harvick	Stewart–Haas Racing
- Laps: 355

Winner
No. 4	Kevin Harvick	Stewart–Haas Racing

Television in the United States
- Network: NBCSN
- Announcers: Rick Allen, Jeff Burton and Steve Letarte
- Nielsen ratings: 1.8/3 (Overnight); 2.1/4 (Final); 3.2 Million viewers

Radio in the United States
- Radio: MRN
- Booth announcers: Joe Moore, Jeff Striegle and Rusty Wallace
- Turn announcers: Mike Bagley (Backstretch)

The 2015 AAA 400 was a NASCAR Sprint Cup Series race held on October 4, 2015, at Dover International Speedway in Dover, Delaware. Contested over 400 laps on the 1 mile (1.6 km) concrete speedway, it was the 29th race of the 2015 NASCAR Sprint Cup Series season, third race of the Chase and final race of the Challenger Round. Kevin Harvick won the race, his third of the season. Kyle Busch finished second. Dale Earnhardt Jr., Jamie McMurray and Aric Almirola rounded out the top–five.

With qualifying rained out, Matt Kenseth was awarded the first starting spot. He led 26 laps on his way to a seventh–place finish. Harvick led a race high of 355 laps on his way to winning the race. The race had 14 lead changes amongst three different drivers, as well as eight caution flag periods for 43 laps.

This was the 31st career victory for Harvick, third of the season, first at Dover International Speedway and second at the track for Stewart–Haas Racing. The win secured his place in the Contender Round. Clint Bowyer, Jimmie Johnson, Jamie McMurray and Paul Menard didn't advance out of the Challenger Round. Chevrolet left Dover with a 45–point lead over Toyota in the manufacturer standings.

The AAA 400 was carried by NBC Sports on the cable/satellite NBCSN network for the American television audience. The radio broadcast for the race was carried by the Motor Racing Network and Sirius XM NASCAR Radio.

== Report ==
=== Background ===
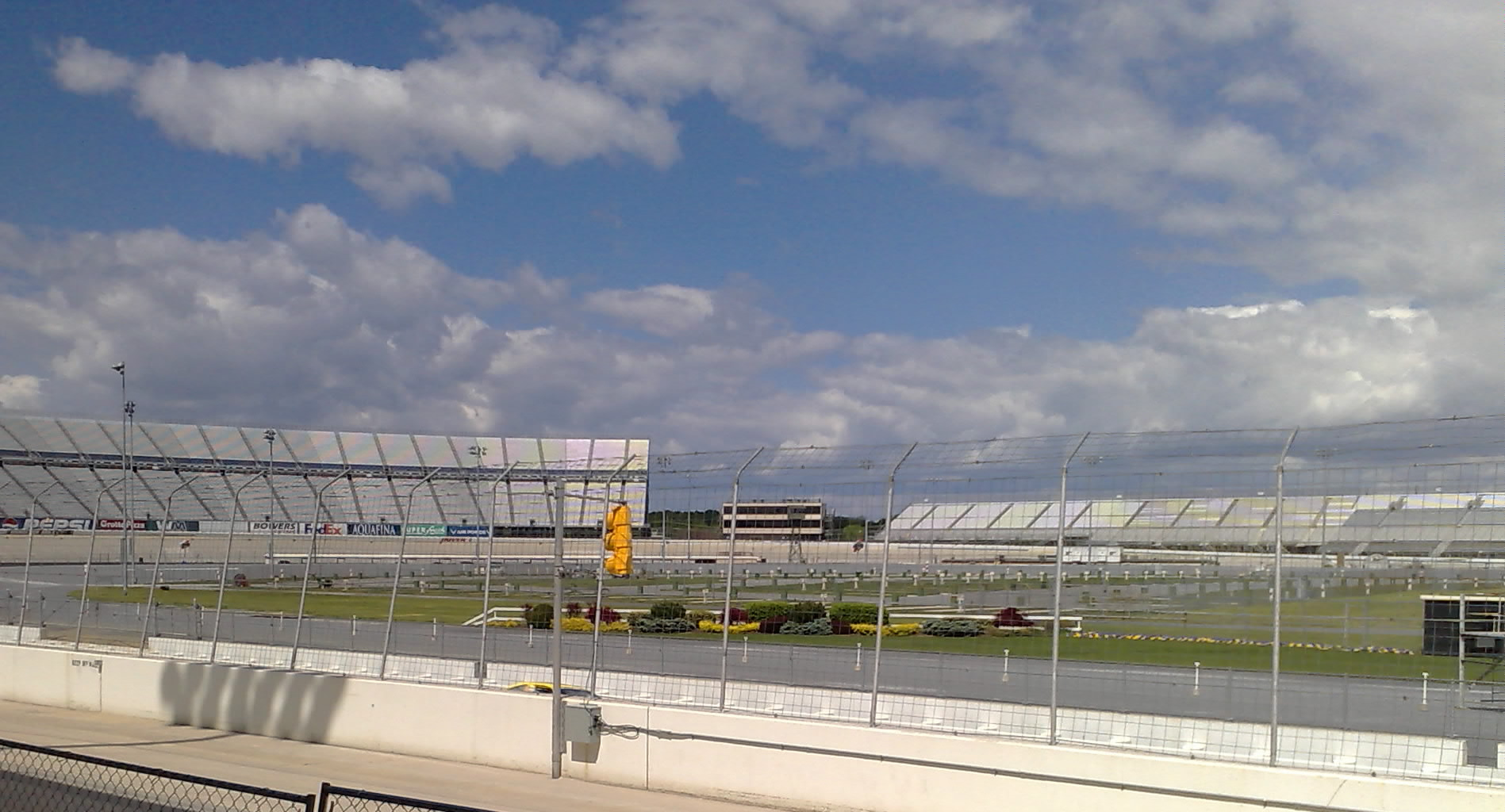
Dover International Speedway, the track where the race was held.

Dover International Speedway is a 1.000 mi (1.609 km) oval track in Dover, Delaware. Matt Kenseth entered Dover with a six–point lead over Denny Hamlin. Carl Edwards and Joey Logano entered tied for third 10–points back. Jimmie Johnson entered fifth 16–points back. Ryan Newman entered sixth 25–points. Kurt Busch entered seventh 26–points back. Brad Keselowski entered eighth 27–points back. Martin Truex Jr. entered ninth 28–points back. Jeff Gordon entered 10th 31–points back. Jamie McMurray entered 11th 41–points back. Dale Earnhardt Jr. entered 12th 42–points back. Kyle Busch and Paul Menard entered tied for 13th 43–points back. Kevin Harvick entered 15th 65–points back. Clint Bowyer entered 16th 81–points back.

==== Hurricane Joaquin ====
In the week leading up to the race, the National Hurricane Center began tracking the development of a storm several hundred miles south-southwest of Bermuda. On September 30, the storm was upgraded to Hurricane Joaquin. The forecast model from the National Weather Service had the storm potentially affecting the race weekend. However, updated models had the storm avoiding landfall on the Eastern U.S. seaboard and moving out into the North Atlantic. Nevertheless, heavy rain was expected to affect the Dover area.

==== Restart zone ====
At the request of the drivers, on the Thursday before the race, NASCAR announced that the restart zone would be expanded from 70 feet (21 m) to 140 feet (43 m). Drivers were pleased with this change.

==== Chase-clinching scenarios ====
The following scenarios were in play for this race.

===== Regardless of another driver's finish =====
Carl Edwards would clinch a spot in the Contender Round if he finished 32nd or better with no laps led, 33rd if he led a lap or 34th if he led the most laps. Joey Logano would clinch by finishing at least 31st or better, 32nd with a lap led or 33rd with most laps led. Jimmie Johnson would clinch if he finished 25th or better, 26th if he leads a lap or 27th if he leads the most laps. Ryan Newman would clinch if he finished 16th or better, 17th if he led a lap or 18th if he led the most laps. Kurt Busch would clinches if he finished 15th or better, 16th if he led a lap or 17th if he led the most laps. Brad Keselowski would clinch if he finished 14th or better, 15th if he led a lap or 16th if he led the most laps. Martin Truex Jr. would clinch if he finished 13th or better, 14th if he led a lap or 15th if he led the most laps. Jeff Gordon would clinch if he finished 10th or better, 11th if he led a lap or 12th if he led the most laps.

===== Must win =====
Jamie McMurray, Dale Earnhardt Jr., Kyle Busch, Paul Menard, Kevin Harvick and Clint Bowyer controlled their destinies only if they won. Otherwise, as would turn out to be the case for Earnhardt and Busch, they were dependent on other non-clinched drivers having bad point days.

==== Entry list ====
The entry list for the AAA 400 was released on Friday, September 25 at 2:27 p.m. Eastern time. Forty-four cars were entered for the race. The four driver changes for this race were J. J. Yeley returning to the No. 26 BK Racing Toyota, Josh Wise returning to the No. 32 Go FAS Racing Ford, Alex Kennedy returning to the No. 33 Hillman-Circle Sport LLC Chevrolet for the first time since Watkins Glen and Reed Sorenson returning to the No. 98 Premium Motorsports Ford. The threat of rain forced The Motorsports Group to withdraw its No. 30 Chevrolet entry from the race. Because of the withdrawal, all 43 cars remaining entered cars made the race.

No.	Driver	Team	Manufacturer
1	Jamie McMurray	Chip Ganassi Racing	Chevrolet
2	Brad Keselowski (PC3)	Team Penske	Ford
3	Austin Dillon	Richard Childress Racing	Chevrolet
4	Kevin Harvick (PC1)	Stewart–Haas Racing	Chevrolet
5	Kasey Kahne	Hendrick Motorsports	Chevrolet
6	Trevor Bayne	Roush Fenway Racing	Ford
7	Alex Bowman	Tommy Baldwin Racing	Chevrolet
9	Sam Hornish Jr.	Richard Petty Motorsports	Ford
10	Danica Patrick	Stewart–Haas Racing	Chevrolet
11	Denny Hamlin	Joe Gibbs Racing	Toyota
13	Casey Mears	Germain Racing	Chevrolet
14	Tony Stewart (PC4)	Stewart–Haas Racing	Chevrolet
15	Clint Bowyer	Michael Waltrip Racing	Toyota
16	Greg Biffle	Roush Fenway Racing	Ford
17	Ricky Stenhouse Jr.	Roush Fenway Racing	Ford
18	Kyle Busch	Joe Gibbs Racing	Toyota
19	Carl Edwards	Joe Gibbs Racing	Toyota
20	Matt Kenseth (PC6)	Joe Gibbs Racing	Toyota
22	Joey Logano	Team Penske	Ford
23	Jeb Burton (R)	BK Racing	Toyota
24	Jeff Gordon (PC7)	Hendrick Motorsports	Chevrolet
26	J. J. Yeley (i)	BK Racing	Toyota
27	Paul Menard	Richard Childress Racing	Chevrolet
31	Ryan Newman	Richard Childress Racing	Chevrolet
32	Josh Wise	Go FAS Racing	Ford
33	Alex Kennedy (R)	Hillman-Circle Sport LLC	Chevrolet
34	Brett Moffitt (R)	Front Row Motorsports	Ford
35	Cole Whitt	Front Row Motorsports	Ford
38	David Gilliland	Front Row Motorsports	Ford
40	Landon Cassill (i)	Hillman-Circle Sport LLC	Chevrolet
41	Kurt Busch (PC5)	Stewart–Haas Racing	Chevrolet
42	Kyle Larson	Chip Ganassi Racing	Chevrolet
43	Aric Almirola	Richard Petty Motorsports	Ford
46	Michael Annett	HScott Motorsports	Chevrolet
47	A. J. Allmendinger	JTG Daugherty Racing	Chevrolet
48	Jimmie Johnson (PC2)	Hendrick Motorsports	Chevrolet
51	Justin Allgaier	HScott Motorsports	Chevrolet
55	David Ragan	Michael Waltrip Racing	Toyota
62	Timmy Hill (i)	Premium Motorsports	Chevrolet
78	Martin Truex Jr.	Furniture Row Racing	Chevrolet
83	Matt DiBenedetto (R)	BK Racing	Toyota
88	Dale Earnhardt Jr.	Hendrick Motorsports	Chevrolet
98	Reed Sorenson	Premium Motorsports	Ford
Official initial entry list
Official final entry list

Key	Meaning
(R)	Rookie
(i)	Ineligible for points
(PC#)	Past champions provisional

== Qualifying ==
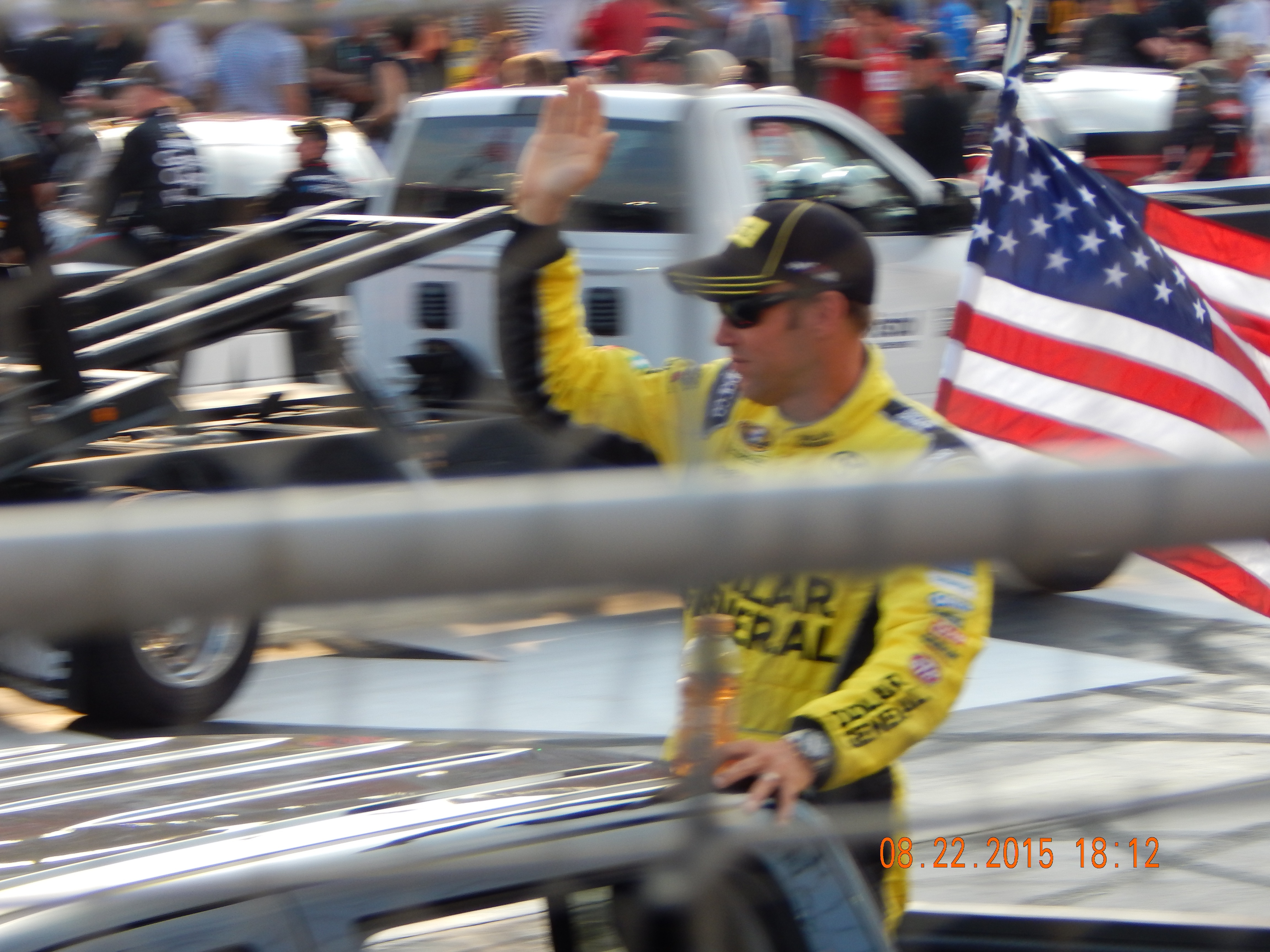
Matt Kenseth led the field to the green flag.

Because inclement weather forced NASCAR to cancel qualifying, along with the Friday practice session, the lineup was set by points. As a result, Matt Kenseth was given the first starting spot. He said that everybody "would have liked to get on the track today and get some practice. I know there are some things we wanted to work on and try to improve from the spring for this race. I think everybody wanted to get on the track. I think it’s one of the advantages of leading the points – obviously if it rains you get a good starting spot and pit stall. Glad we’re starting in the front, but still would have liked the track time.”

=== Starting lineup ===
Pos	No.	Driver	Team	Manufacturer
1	20	Matt Kenseth	Joe Gibbs Racing	Toyota
2	11	Denny Hamlin	Joe Gibbs Racing	Toyota
3	19	Carl Edwards	Joe Gibbs Racing	Toyota
4	22	Joey Logano	Team Penske	Ford
5	48	Jimmie Johnson	Hendrick Motorsports	Chevrolet
6	31	Ryan Newman	Richard Childress Racing	Chevrolet
7	41	Kurt Busch	Stewart–Haas Racing	Chevrolet
8	2	Brad Keselowski	Team Penske	Ford
9	78	Martin Truex Jr. (Note: Martin Truex Jr. started the race from the rear of the field for unapproved adjustments.)	Furniture Row Racing	Chevrolet
10	24	Jeff Gordon	Hendrick Motorsports	Chevrolet
11	1	Jamie McMurray	Chip Ganassi Racing	Chevrolet
12	88	Dale Earnhardt Jr.	Hendrick Motorsports	Chevrolet
13	18	Kyle Busch	Joe Gibbs Racing	Toyota
14	27	Paul Menard	Richard Childress Racing	Chevrolet
15	4	Kevin Harvick	Stewart–Haas Racing	Chevrolet
16	15	Clint Bowyer	Michael Waltrip Racing	Toyota
17	5	Kasey Kahne	Hendrick Motorsports	Chevrolet
18	43	Aric Almirola	Richard Petty Motorsports	Ford
19	42	Kyle Larson	Chip Ganassi Racing	Chevrolet
20	16	Greg Biffle	Roush Fenway Racing	Ford
21	3	Austin Dillon	Richard Childress Racing	Chevrolet
22	13	Casey Mears	Germain Racing	Chevrolet
23	47	A. J. Allmendinger	JTG Daugherty Racing	Chevrolet
24	10	Danica Patrick	Stewart–Haas Racing	Chevrolet
25	14	Tony Stewart	Stewart–Haas Racing	Chevrolet
26	9	Sam Hornish Jr.	Richard Petty Motorsports	Ford
27	17	Ricky Stenhouse Jr.	Roush Fenway Racing	Ford
28	55	David Ragan	Michael Waltrip Racing	Toyota
29	6	Trevor Bayne	Roush Fenway Racing	Ford
30	51	Justin Allgaier	HScott Motorsports	Chevrolet
31	35	Cole Whitt	Front Row Motorsports	Ford
32	38	David Gilliland	Front Row Motorsports	Ford
33	40	Landon Cassill (i)	Hillman-Circle Sport LLC	Chevrolet
34	34	Brett Moffitt (R)	Front Row Motorsports	Chevrolet
35	7	Alex Bowman	Tommy Baldwin Racing	Chevrolet
36	33	Alex Kennedy (R)	Hillman-Circle Sport LLC	Chevrolet
37	83	Matt DiBenedetto (R)	BK Racing	Toyota
38	46	Michael Annett	HScott Motorsports	Chevrolet
39	23	Jeb Burton (R)	BK Racing	Toyota
40	98	Reed Sorenson	Premium Motorsports	Ford
41	32	Josh Wise	Go FAS Racing	Ford
42	26	J. J. Yeley (i)	BK Racing	Toyota
43	62	Timmy Hill (i)	Premium Motorsports	Chevrolet
Official starting lineup

== Practice ==
=== First practice ===
Kasey Kahne was the fastest in the first practice session with a time of 22.429 and a speed of 160.506 mph (258.309 km/h).

Pos	No.	Driver	Team	Manufacturer	Time	Speed
1	5	Kasey Kahne	Hendrick Motorsports	Chevrolet	22.429	160.506
2	19	Carl Edwards	Joe Gibbs Racing	Toyota	22.438	160.442
3	11	Denny Hamlin	Joe Gibbs Racing	Toyota	22.460	160.285
Official first practice results

=== Final practice ===
Kevin Harvick was the fastest in the final practice session with a time of 23.072 and a speed of 156.033 mph (251.111 km/h). The session only lasted 15 minutes before rain cut it short.

Pos	No.	Driver	Team	Manufacturer	Time	Speed
1	4	Kevin Harvick	Stewart–Haas Racing	Chevrolet	23.072	156.033
2	19	Carl Edwards	Joe Gibbs Racing	Toyota	23.075	156.013
3	5	Kasey Kahne	Hendrick Motorsports	Chevrolet	23.109	155.783
Official final practice results

== Race ==
=== First half ===
==== Start ====
Under cloudy Delaware skies, Matt Kenseth led the field to the green flag at 2:51 p.m. It only took until lap 3 for the first caution of the race to come out. This was when Josh Wise made contact with Jeb Burton in turn 1 and sent him spinning.

The race restarted on lap 7. Just 10 laps later, Kenseth pulled to a one-second lead over his teammate Denny Hamlin. This lead began shrinking over the next six laps to just a quarter of a second over Kevin Harvick, who eventually took over that position on lap 25. As Harvick stayed out in front, he pulled to a two-second lead over Kenseth. The second caution of the race flew on lap 41. This was a scheduled competition caution for all the rain that the state of Delaware had throughout the entire weekend. Harvick swapped the lead with Kenseth on pit road and Hamlin exited with the lead. It was short-lived, as he and Jimmie Johnson were both tagged for speeding on pit road and restarted from the tail-end of the field. This would give the lead back to Harvick.

The race restarted on lap 46. Harvick pulled to a five-second lead over Kyle Busch after 40 laps. After falling to the back on the restart for the speeding penalty, Hamlin was put down a lap by Harvick on lap 90. Jimmie Johnson made an unscheduled stop on lap 103 for an issue with the drive line. They couldn't fix it on pit road and he took the car to the garage. Following the race, he said that it was "tough having a very inexpensive axle seal be the culprit and take your championship hopes away. It's racing. I’ve had mechanicals take me out of championships growing up that led to some success for myself and I’m sure helped me with a championship or two. It’s just part of racing. It just shows how critical everything is on a race team. And how important every component is and you can’t take anything for granted. Heartbreaking for sure, but I don’t know what else we can do about it we just have to go on and try to win races and close out the season strong.” Debris on the front stretch brought out the third caution of the race on lap 111. The debris came from the No. 83 car of Matt DiBenedetto. Harvick swapped the lead with Busch on pit road, but exited with the lead.

==== Second quarter ====
The race restarted on lap 118. Harvick once again pulled away from the field and began putting cars several of laps down. After 30 laps, he had lapped over half the field at least once. After 60 laps, he lapped everyone up to Brad Keselowski, who sat in 14th place. The fourth caution flew on lap 193 when Jeb Burton suffered a right-front tire blowout and slammed the wall in turn 2. He would go on to finish last. Harvick and Kyle Busch swapped the lead on pit road, but exited with the lead.

=== Second half ===
==== Halfway ====
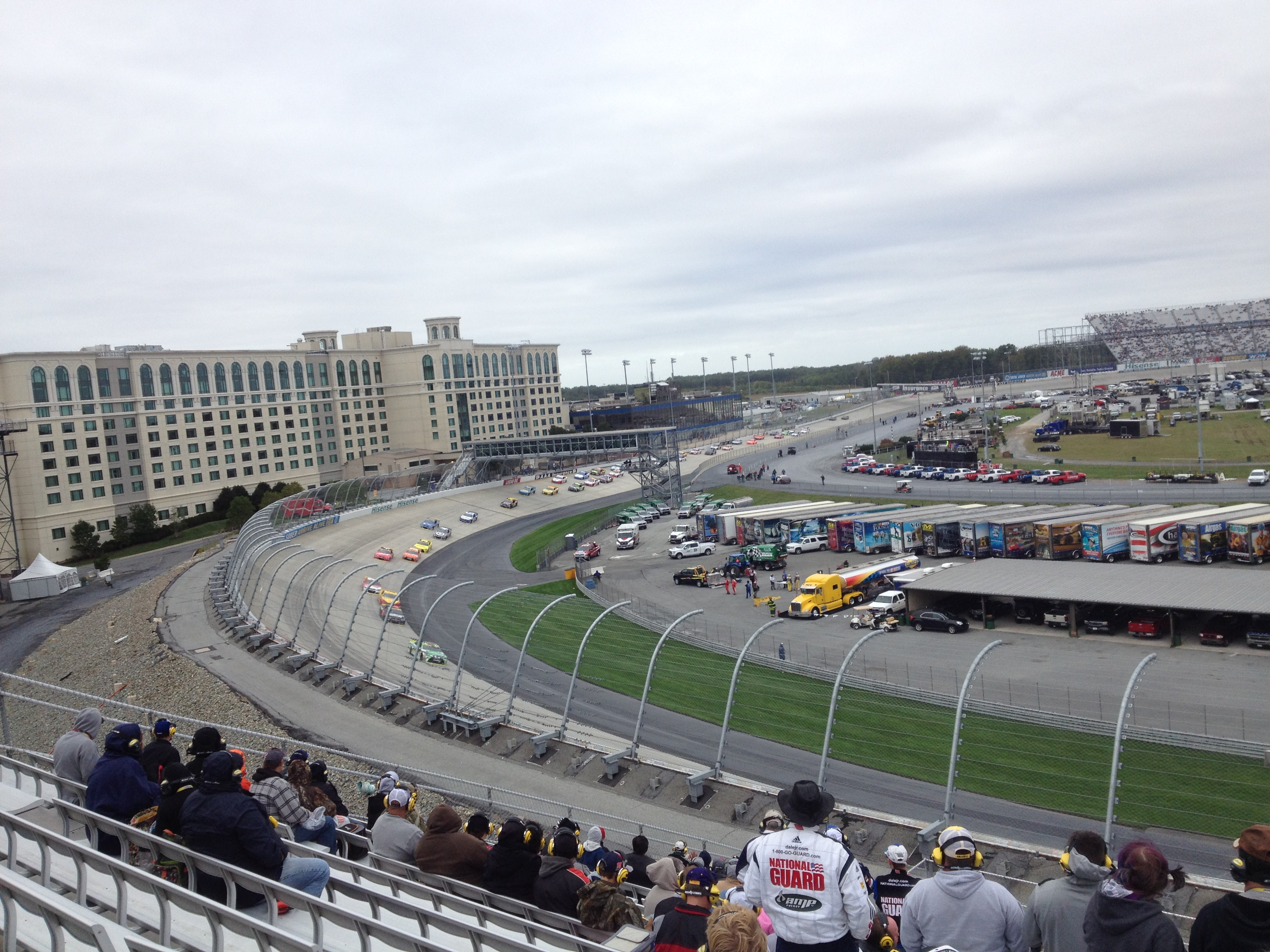
Kyle Busch leading the field following a restart

The race restarted on lap 206. Debris on the front stretch brought out the fifth caution on lap 232. Harvick and Busch swapped the lead on pit road. This time, however, Busch took just right-side tires and exited with the lead. Hamlin was tagged for speeding on pit road and restarted from the tail-end of the field.

The race restarted on lap 237. Harvick didn't waste any time passing the third and second–place cars. He drove under Busch in turn 2 to retake the lead on lap 249. The sixth caution flew on lap 312 when A. J. Allmendinger got loose and spun out in turn 4 while trying to get on pit road. Harvick and Busch again swapped the lead on pit road, but Harvick exited with it. With the stop being outside the 85-lap fuel window, most of the cars on the lead lap began shutting off their engines to conserve fuel.

==== Fourth quarter ====
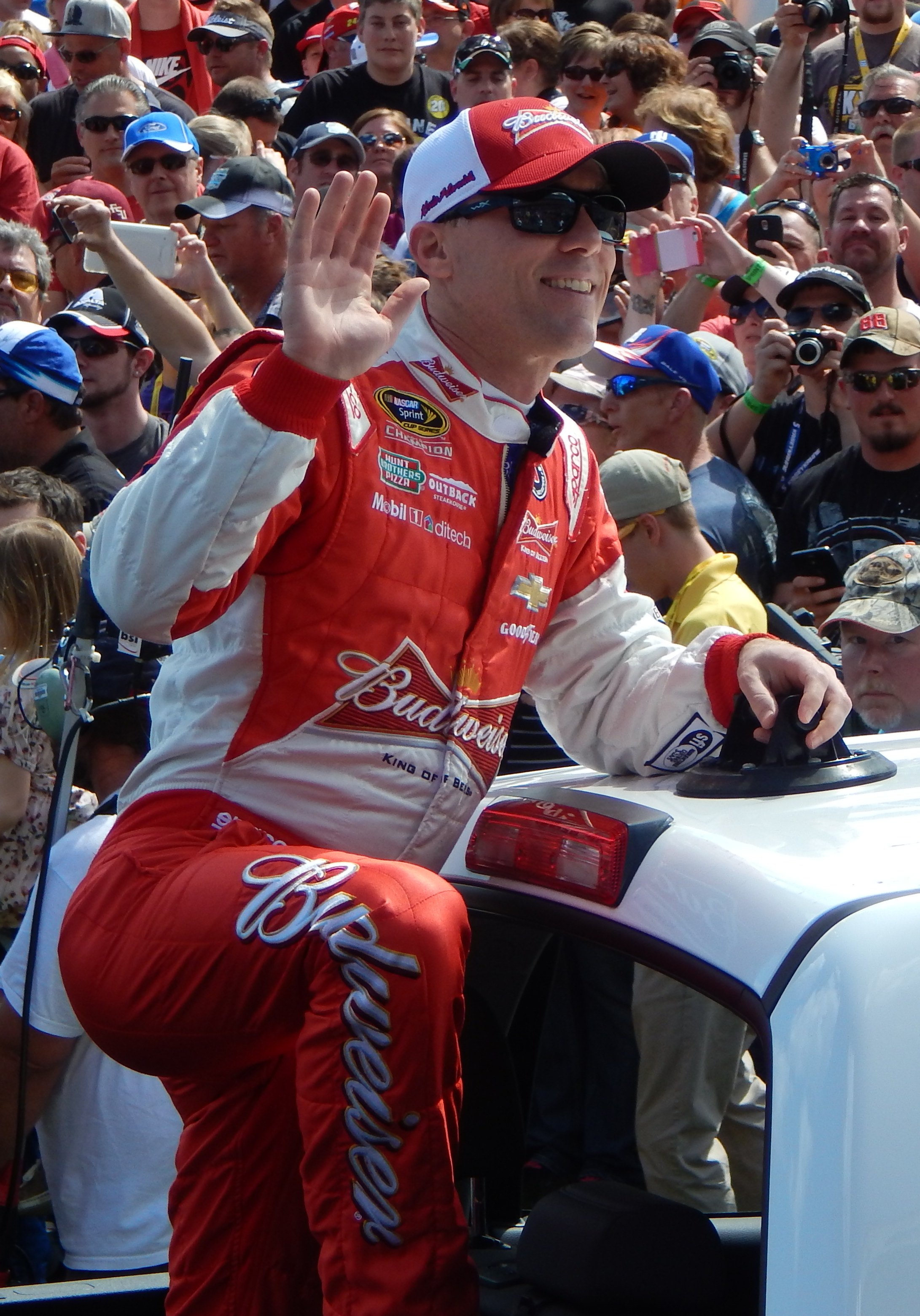
Kevin Harvick, seen here at the 2015 Daytona 500, scored his 31st career victory at Dover.

The race restarted with 84 laps to go. The seventh caution of the race flew with 47 laps to go for a single-car wreck in turn 1. Brett Moffitt suffered a right-front tire blowout and slammed the wall. Matt Kenseth opted not to pit under the caution and assumed the lead.

The race restarted with 42 laps to go. Kenseth was no match for Kevin Harvick on old tires and lost the lead to Kevin. The eighth caution of the race flew with 29 laps to go for fluid on the track. The fluid came from the No. 40 car of Landon Cassill after his engine blew up.

The race restarted with 24 laps to go. Kevin Harvick drove on to score his 31st career victory. While Jamie Mcmurray, Jimmie Johnson, Paul Menard and Clint Bowyer were the 4 drivers eliminated from the chase.

== Post-race ==
=== Driver comments ===
Harvick said that he was "just so proud of everybody from Stewart–Haas Racing to do everything that we’ve done the last three weeks, really. Obviously we weren’t in a great position coming in to today. That’s what these guys are made of and that’s what teamwork is all about."

Following his runner-up finish, Kyle Busch said that the day was "really good...for us. I can't say enough about this entire Interstate Batteries team. They did a great job today. Adam Stevens gave me a great piece and when you look at the amount of practice time we had, it was pretty hard to figure out what you had. We had a second–place car and we finished second with it; nothing to hang our heads about."

Dale Earnhardt Jr. finished third and advanced to the Contender Round on a tiebreaker. After the race, he said that the closing laps weren't "nerve-wracking at all. You're either going to make it or you ain't. I'm going to try put together the best lap I can put together, and drive the car as hard as you can without over-driving it. You can't really worry about the big picture because you have to concentrate on running the lap. This place is so technical that you just have to concentrate on every corner and the mistake you made on the last one and how you make a better corner the next time through there. That's all you really worry about."

Jamie McMurray failed to make the Contender Round on a tiebreaker with a fourth–place finish. After the race, he said that he was "driving so hard those last few laps, and it’s just hard to make up any ground. And it seemed like our car was maybe better on stickers,” McMurray explained. “We haven’t run this well, honestly. We talked earlier today about that. So, I’m thrilled with our performance today. It’s frustrating that we weren’t able to make it to the next round, but it was a good day for the Nature Made car. We just needed one more point.”

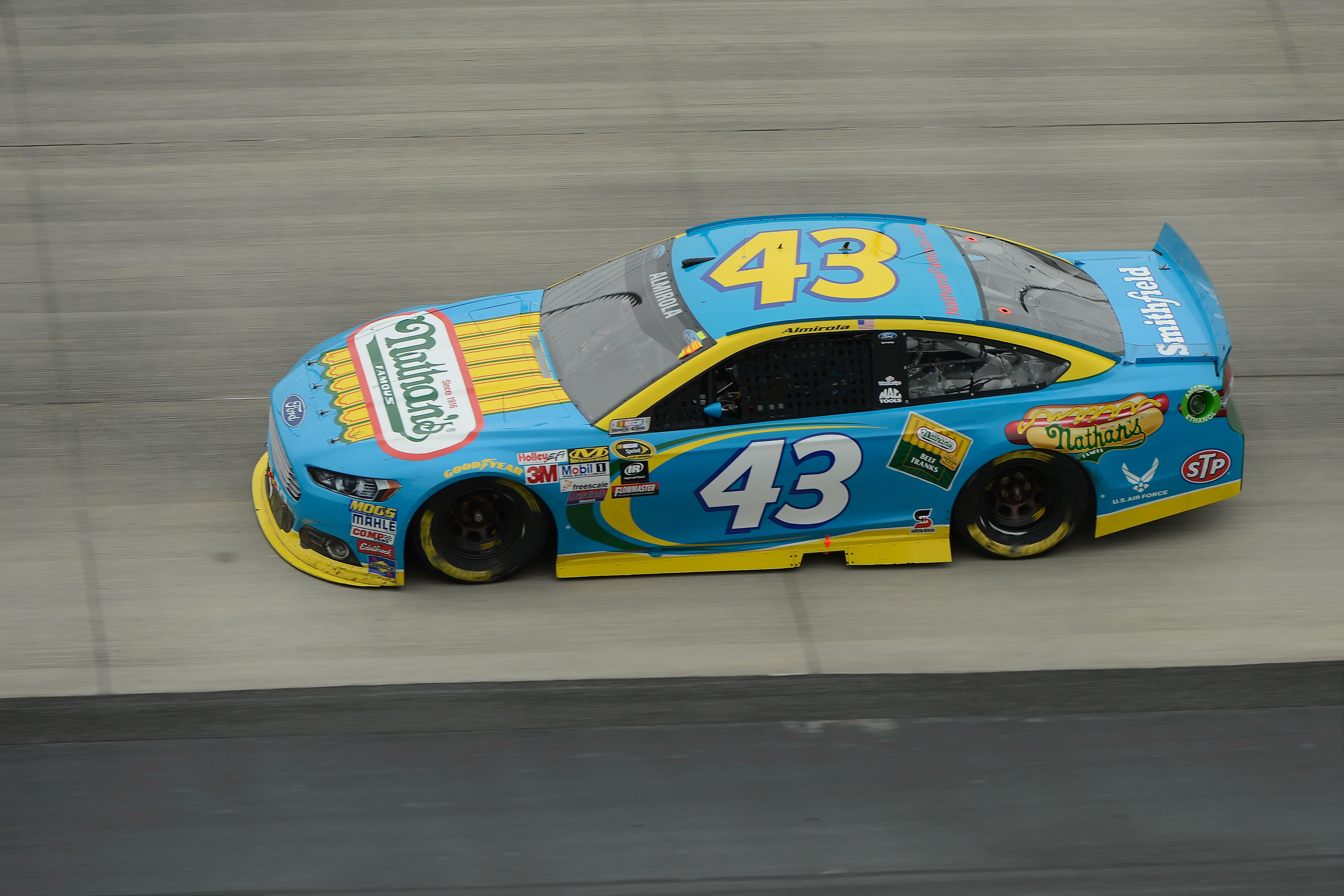
Almirola finished fifth, his best position so far this season

After driving under the radar to a fifth–place finish, Aric Almirola said that his team did "a really good job. We just struggled with getting the car in the race track most of the day and right there at the end four tires paid off for us. That was some really good adjustments by Trent and the guys and the pit crew did a good job getting me off pit road and just a really solid day for us.”

Martin Truex Jr. drove from the rear of the field to an 11th–place finish. He said after the race that he didn't have "a great day...It wasn’t a great weekend. We have been struggling trying to get the thing turning. All in all we had good speed when we would get track position. We would lose track position and being in long lines on the restarts when we couldn’t really go anywhere. It was really difficult to pass today. We had good speed out front, top five speed and then just never really could get back there once we got back in traffic.”

A 12th–place finish was enough for Jeff Gordon to advance into the Contender Round. After the race, he said that making it involved "a lot of hard work. I'm proud of these guys. We fought hard and that's what we've been doing all year long. It hasn't been pretty. We've had a lot to overcome and we never give. That was pretty much what he had today, we survived and made it through."

After a 14th–place finish wasn't enough to get Clint Bowyer into the Contender Round, he said after the race that his "5-Hour Energy Toyota was good today, I’d say a top-five car. We just had some bad luck with that loose wheel early on. We got two laps down, but were able to make those up. No one had anything for that 4 car (Harvick), though.”

Following his 25th–place finish that kept him from advancing to the Contender Round, Paul Menard said that it "was not a good day for us at Dover. We fought handling all day and found out there was a mechanical issue there near the end. We gave it our all and I'm proud that we got here. Hate that we don't get to compete further into the Chase, but we will work for a win and to advance our spot from where we are.”

== Race results ==
Pos	No.	Driver	Team	Manufacturer	Laps	Points
1	4	Kevin Harvick	Stewart–Haas Racing	Chevrolet	400	48
2	18	Kyle Busch	Joe Gibbs Racing	Toyota	400	43
3	88	Dale Earnhardt Jr.	Hendrick Motorsports	Chevrolet	400	41
4	1	Jamie McMurray	Chip Ganassi Racing	Chevrolet	400	40
5	43	Aric Almirola	Richard Petty Motorsports	Ford	400	39
6	5	Kasey Kahne	Hendrick Motorsports	Chevrolet	400	38
7	20	Matt Kenseth	Joe Gibbs Racing	Toyota	400	38
8	17	Ricky Stenhouse Jr.	Roush Fenway Racing	Ford	400	36
9	42	Kyle Larson	Chip Ganassi Racing	Chevrolet	400	35
10	22	Joey Logano	Team Penske	Ford	400	34
11	78	Martin Truex Jr.	Furniture Row Racing	Chevrolet	400	33
12	24	Jeff Gordon	Hendrick Motorsports	Chevrolet	400	32
13	16	Greg Biffle	Roush Fenway Racing	Ford	400	31
14	15	Clint Bowyer	Michael Waltrip Racing	Toyota	400	30
15	19	Carl Edwards	Joe Gibbs Racing	Toyota	400	29
16	2	Brad Keselowski	Team Penske	Ford	400	28
17	41	Kurt Busch	Stewart–Haas Racing	Chevrolet	400	27
18	11	Denny Hamlin	Joe Gibbs Racing	Toyota	400	26
19	31	Ryan Newman	Richard Childress Racing	Chevrolet	399	25
20	9	Sam Hornish Jr.	Richard Petty Motorsports	Ford	398	24
21	10	Danica Patrick	Stewart–Haas Racing	Chevrolet	398	23
22	55	David Ragan	Michael Waltrip Racing	Toyota	398	22
23	3	Austin Dillon	Richard Childress Racing	Chevrolet	398	21
24	13	Casey Mears	Germain Racing	Chevrolet	397	20
25	27	Paul Menard	Richard Childress Racing	Chevrolet	397	19
26	14	Tony Stewart	Stewart–Haas Racing	Chevrolet	396	18
27	51	Justin Allgaier	HScott Motorsports	Chevrolet	395	17
28	35	Cole Whitt	Front Row Motorsports	Ford	394	16
29	47	A. J. Allmendinger	JTG Daugherty Racing	Chevrolet	394	15
30	38	David Gilliland	Front Row Motorsports	Ford	394	14
31	6	Trevor Bayne	Roush Fenway Racing	Ford	393	13
32	7	Alex Bowman	Tommy Baldwin Racing	Chevrolet	393	12
33	98	Reed Sorenson	Premium Motorsports	Ford	391	11
34	83	Matt DiBenedetto (R)	BK Racing	Toyota	391	10
35	26	J. J. Yeley (i)	BK Racing	Toyota	390	9
36	32	Josh Wise	Go FAS Racing	Ford	389	8
37	46	Michael Annett	HScott Motorsports	Chevrolet	387	7
38	33	Alex Kennedy (R)	Hillman-Circle Sport LLC	Chevrolet	386	6
39	62	Timmy Hill (i)	Premium Motorsports	Chevrolet	380	5
40	40	Landon Cassill (i)	Hillman-Circle Sport LLC	Chevrolet	365	4
41	48	Jimmie Johnson	Hendrick Motorsports	Chevrolet	364	3
42	34	Brett Moffitt (R)	Front Row Motorsports	Ford	346	2
43	23	Jeb Burton (R)	BK Racing	Toyota	186	1
Official AAA 400 results

=== Race statistics ===
- 14 lead changes among 3 different drivers
- 8 cautions for 43 laps
- Time of race: 3 hours, 20 minutes, 13 seconds
- Average speed: 119.870 mph (192.912 km/h)
- Kevin Harvick took home $263,590 in winnings

Lap Leaders
Laps	Leader
1-23	Matt Kenseth
24-41	Kevin Harvick
42	Matt Kenseth
43-112	Kevin Harvick
113	Kyle Busch
114-195	Kevin Harvick
196	Kyle Busch
197-232	Kevin Harvick
233-247	Kyle Busch
248-312	Kevin Harvick
313	Kyle Busch
314-354	Kevin Harvick
355	Kyle Busch
356-357	Matt Kenseth
358-400	Kevin Harvick

Total laps led
Leader	Laps
Kevin Harvick	355
Matt Kenseth	26
Kyle Busch	19

==== Race awards ====
- Coors Light Pole Award: No winner
- 3M Lap Leader: Kevin Harvick (355 laps)
- American Ethanol Green Flag Restart Award: Kevin Harvick
- Duralast Brakes "Bake In The Race" Award: Matt Kenseth
- Freescale "Wide Open": Jamie McMurray
- Ingersoll Rand Power Move: Aric Almirola (7 positions)
- MAHLE Clevite Engine Builder of the Race: Hendrick Engines, #4
- Mobil 1 Driver of the Race: Kevin Harvick (149.7 driver rating)
- Moog Steering and Suspension Problem Solver of The Race: Dale Earnhardt Jr. (crew chief Greg Ives (0.132 seconds))
- NASCAR Sprint Cup Leader Bonus: No winner, rolls over to $20,000 at next event
- Sherwin-Williams Fastest Lap: Matt Kenseth (Lap 9, 22.471, 160.206 mph (257.827 km/h))
- Sunoco Rookie of The Race: Matt DiBenedetto

== Media ==
=== Television ===
NBCSN covered the race on the television side. Rick Allen, 2006 race winner Jeff Burton and Steve Letarte had the call in the booth for the race. Dave Burns, Mike Massaro, Marty Snider and Kelli Stavast handled pit road on the television side.

NBCSN
Booth announcers	Pit reporters
Lap-by-lap: Rick Allen; Color-commentator: Jeff Burton; Color-commentator: Steve Letarte	Dave Burns; Mike Massaro; Marty Snider; Kelli Stavast

=== Radio ===
MRN had the radio call for the race, which was simulcast on Sirius XM NASCAR Radio. Joe Moore, Jeff Striegle and three–time Dover winner Rusty Wallace called the race from the booth when the field was racing down the front stretch. Mike Bagley called the race from the turn 3 stands when the field was racing down the backstretch. Alex Hayden, Winston Kelley and Steve Post handled pit road on the radio side.

MRN
Booth announcers	Turn announcers	Pit reporters
Lead announcer: Joe Moore; Announcer: Jeff Striegle; Announcer: Rusty Wallace	Backstretch: Mike Bagley	Alex Hayden; Winston Kelley; Steve Post

== Standings after the race ==
Drivers' Championship standings

	Pos	Driver	Points
	1	Matt Kenseth	3,000
2	2	Joey Logano	3,000 (–0)
1	3	Denny Hamlin	3,000 (–0)
1	4	Carl Edwards	3,000 (–0)
4	5	Martin Truex Jr.	3,000 (–0)
1	6	Kurt Busch	3,000 (–0)
3	7	Jeff Gordon	3,000 (–0)
	8	Brad Keselowski	3,000 (–0)
4	9	Kyle Busch	3,000 (–0)
4	10	Ryan Newman	3,000 (–0)
1	11	Dale Earnhardt Jr.	3,000 (–0)
1	12	Kevin Harvick	3,000 (–0)
8	13	Jamie McMurray	2,098 (–902)
1	14	Jimmie Johnson	2,086 (–914)
1	15	Paul Menard	2,075 (–925)
	16	Clint Bowyer	2,048 (–952)

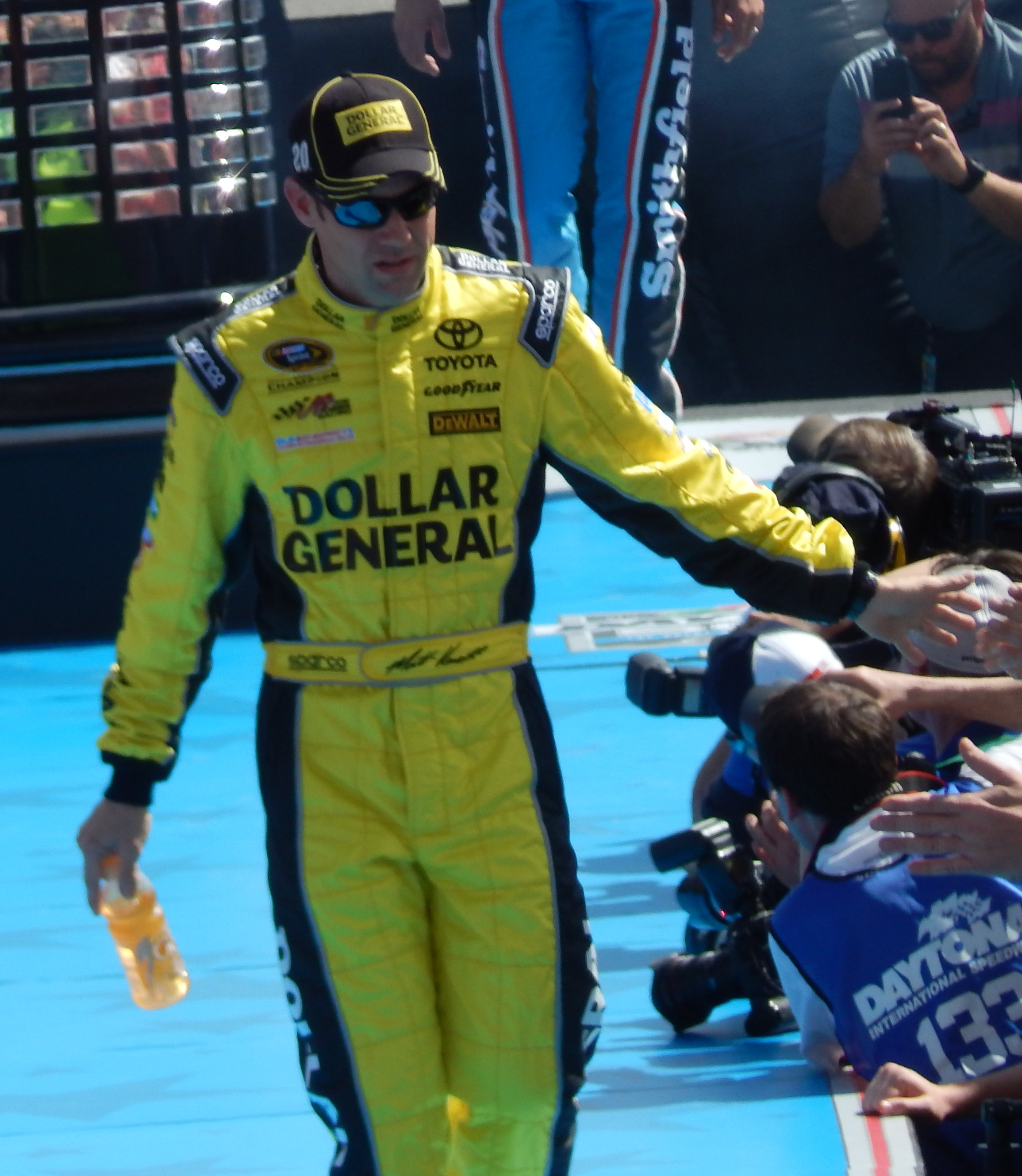
Matt Kenseth left Dover tied for the points lead with 11 other drivers.

Manufacturers' Championship standings

Pos	Manufacturer	Points
1	Chevrolet	1,273
2	Toyota	1,228 (–45)
3	Ford	1,200 (–73)

- Note: Only the first sixteen positions are included for the driver standings.

== Note ==
Previous race: 2015 Sylvania 300	Sprint Cup Series; 2015 season	Next race: 2015 Bank of America 500
