= 2015 Hollywood Casino 400 =

Race details
- Race 31 of 36 in the 2015 NASCAR Sprint Cup Series
- Date: October 18, 2015
- Location: Kansas Speedway in Kansas City, Kansas
- Course: Permanent racing facility
- Course length: 1.5 miles (2.414 km)
- Distance: 269 laps, 403.5 mi (649.370 km)
- Scheduled distance: 267 laps, 400.5 mi (644.542 km)
- Weather: Clear blue skies with a temperature of 66 °F (19 °C); wind out of the south/southeast at 13 mph (21 km/h)
- Average speed: 135.732 mph (218.439 km/h)

Pole position
Driver	Brad Keselowski	Team Penske
- Time: 27.621

Most laps led
Driver	Matt Kenseth	Joe Gibbs Racing
- Laps: 153

Winner
No. 22	Joey Logano	Team Penske

Television in the United States
- Network: NBC
- Announcers: Rick Allen, Jeff Burton and Steve Letarte
- Nielsen ratings: 2.2/4 (Overnight); 2.5/5 (Final); 4.0 Million viewers

Radio in the United States
- Radio: MRN
- Booth announcers: Joe Moore, Jeff Striegle and Rusty Wallace
- Turn announcers: Dave Moody (1 & 2) and Mike Bagley (3 & 4)

The 2015 Hollywood Casino 400 was a NASCAR Sprint Cup Series race held on October 18, 2015, at Kansas Speedway in Kansas City, Kansas. Contested over 269 laps – extended from 267 laps with a green-white-checker finish – on the 1.5-mile (2.4-kilometre) intermediate speedway, it was the 31st race of the 2015 NASCAR Sprint Cup Series season, fifth race of the Chase and second race of the Contender Round. Joey Logano won the race, his fifth of the season. Denny Hamlin finished second. Jimmie Johnson, Kasey Kahne and Kyle Busch rounded out the top–five.

Brad Keselowski won the pole for the race and led 28 laps on his way to a ninth–place finish. Matt Kenseth led a race high of 153 laps before being spun out by Logano with five laps remaining and finished 14th. The race had 21 lead changes among nine different drivers, as well as seven caution flag periods for 39 laps.

This was the 13th career victory for Logano, fifth of the season, second at Kansas Speedway and fourth at the track for Team Penske. Logano left Kansas with a 13–point lead over Hamlin. Despite being the winning manufacturer, Ford left Kansas trailing Chevrolet by 47 points in the manufacturer standings.

The Hollywood Casino 400 was carried by NBC Sports on the broadcast NBC network for the American television audience. The radio broadcast for the race was carried by the Motor Racing Network and Sirius XM NASCAR Radio.

== Report ==
=== Background ===
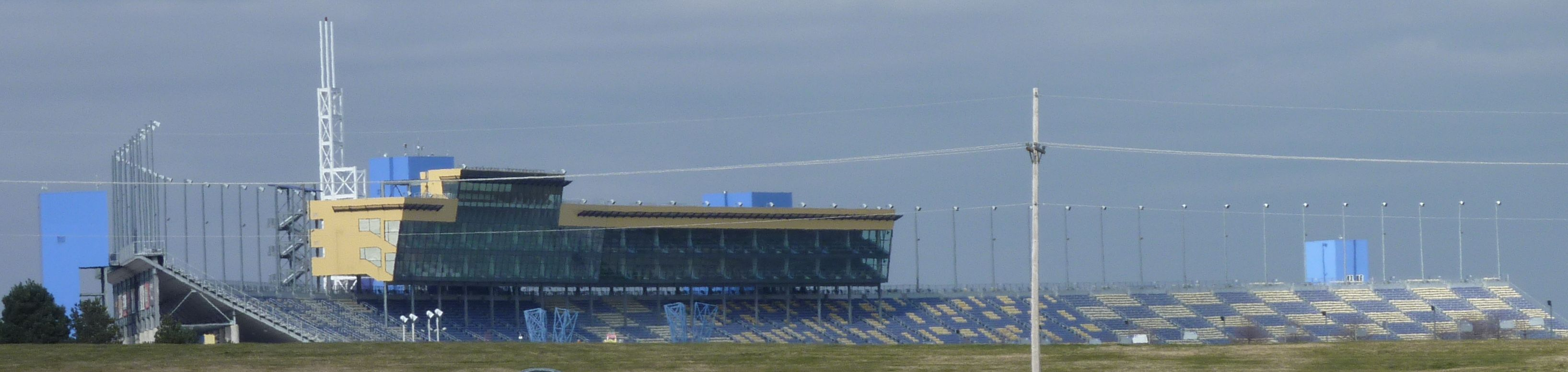
Kansas Speedway, the track where the race was held.

Kansas Speedway is a 1.5-mile (2.4-kilometre) tri-oval race track in Kansas City, Kansas. Joey Logano entered with a six–point lead over Kevin Harvick. Martin Truex Jr. entered third seven points back. Denny Hamlin entered fourth eight points back. Kurt Busch and Carl Edwards entered tied for fifth nine points back. Jeff Gordon entered seventh 11 points back. Brad Keselowski entered eighth 13 points back. Ryan Newman entered ninth 19 points back. Kyle Busch entered 10th 23 points back. Dale Earnhardt Jr. entered 11th 32 points back. Matt Kenseth entered 12th 45 points back.

==== Entry list ====
The entry list for the Hollywood Casino 400 was released on Monday, October 12 at 10:00 a.m. Eastern time. Forty-four cars were entered for the race. All were entered in the previous week's race at Charlotte. The two driver changes for this weekend's race were Will Kimmel attempting to make his second career start in the No. 32 Go FAS Racing Ford and Brian Scott returning to the seat of the No. 33 Hillman-Circle Sport LLC Chevrolet.

No.	Driver	Team	Manufacturer
1	Jamie McMurray	Chip Ganassi Racing	Chevrolet
2	Brad Keselowski (PC2)	Team Penske	Ford
3	Austin Dillon	Richard Childress Racing	Chevrolet
4	Kevin Harvick (PC1)	Stewart–Haas Racing	Chevrolet
5	Kasey Kahne	Hendrick Motorsports	Chevrolet
6	Trevor Bayne	Roush Fenway Racing	Ford
7	Alex Bowman	Tommy Baldwin Racing	Chevrolet
9	Sam Hornish Jr.	Richard Petty Motorsports	Ford
10	Danica Patrick	Stewart–Haas Racing	Chevrolet
11	Denny Hamlin	Joe Gibbs Racing	Toyota
13	Casey Mears	Germain Racing	Chevrolet
14	Tony Stewart (PC2)	Stewart–Haas Racing	Chevrolet
15	Clint Bowyer	Michael Waltrip Racing	Toyota
16	Greg Biffle	Roush Fenway Racing	Ford
17	Ricky Stenhouse Jr.	Roush Fenway Racing	Ford
18	Kyle Busch	Joe Gibbs Racing	Toyota
19	Carl Edwards	Joe Gibbs Racing	Toyota
20	Matt Kenseth (PC1)	Joe Gibbs Racing	Toyota
21	Ryan Blaney (i)	Wood Brothers Racing	Ford
22	Joey Logano	Team Penske	Ford
23	Jeb Burton (R)	BK Racing	Toyota
24	Jeff Gordon (PC4)	Hendrick Motorsports	Chevrolet
26	J. J. Yeley (i)	BK Racing	Toyota
27	Paul Menard	Richard Childress Racing	Chevrolet
31	Ryan Newman	Richard Childress Racing	Chevrolet
32	Will Kimmel	Go FAS Racing	Ford
33	Brian Scott (i)	Hillman-Circle Sport LLC	Chevrolet
34	Brett Moffitt (R)	Front Row Motorsports	Ford
35	Cole Whitt	Front Row Motorsports	Ford
38	David Gilliland	Front Row Motorsports	Ford
40	Landon Cassill (i)	Hillman-Circle Sport LLC	Chevrolet
41	Kurt Busch (PC1)	Stewart–Haas Racing	Chevrolet
42	Kyle Larson	Chip Ganassi Racing	Chevrolet
43	Aric Almirola	Richard Petty Motorsports	Ford
46	Michael Annett	HScott Motorsports	Chevrolet
47	A. J. Allmendinger	JTG Daugherty Racing	Chevrolet
48	Jimmie Johnson (PC5)	Hendrick Motorsports	Chevrolet
51	Justin Allgaier	HScott Motorsports	Chevrolet
55	David Ragan	Michael Waltrip Racing	Toyota
62	Timmy Hill (i)	Premium Motorsports	Chevrolet
78	Martin Truex Jr.	Furniture Row Racing	Chevrolet
83	Matt DiBenedetto (R)	BK Racing	Toyota
88	Dale Earnhardt Jr.	Hendrick Motorsports	Chevrolet
98	Reed Sorenson	Premium Motorsports	Ford
Official entry list
Official final entry list

Key	Meaning
(R)	Rookie
(i)	Ineligible for points
(PC#)	Past championships

== Practice ==
=== First practice ===
Brad Keselowski was the fastest in the first practice session with a time of 27.785 and a speed of 194.349 mph (312.774 km/h).

Pos	No.	Driver	Team	Manufacturer	Time	Speed
1	2	Brad Keselowski	Team Penske	Ford	27.785	194.349
2	3	Austin Dillon	Richard Childress Racing	Chevrolet	27.803	194.224
3	20	Matt Kenseth	Joe Gibbs Racing	Toyota	27.814	194.147
Official first practice results

=== Second practice ===
Brad Keselowski was the fastest in the second practice session with a time of 28.427 and a speed of 189.960 mph (305.711 km/h).

Pos	No.	Driver	Team	Manufacturer	Time	Speed
1	2	Brad Keselowski	Team Penske	Ford	28.427	189.960
2	20	Matt Kenseth	Joe Gibbs Racing	Toyota	28.539	189.215
3	22	Joey Logano	Team Penske	Ford	28.562	189.062
Official second practice results

=== Final practice ===
Jimmie Johnson was the fastest in the final practice session with a time of 28.574 and a speed of 188.983 mph (304.139 km/h).

Pos	No.	Driver	Team	Manufacturer	Time	Speed
1	48	Jimmie Johnson	Hendrick Motorsports	Chevrolet	28.574	188.983
2	2	Brad Keselowski	Team Penske	Ford	28.582	188.930
3	11	Denny Hamlin	Joe Gibbs Racing	Toyota	28.607	188.765
Official final practice results

== Qualifying ==
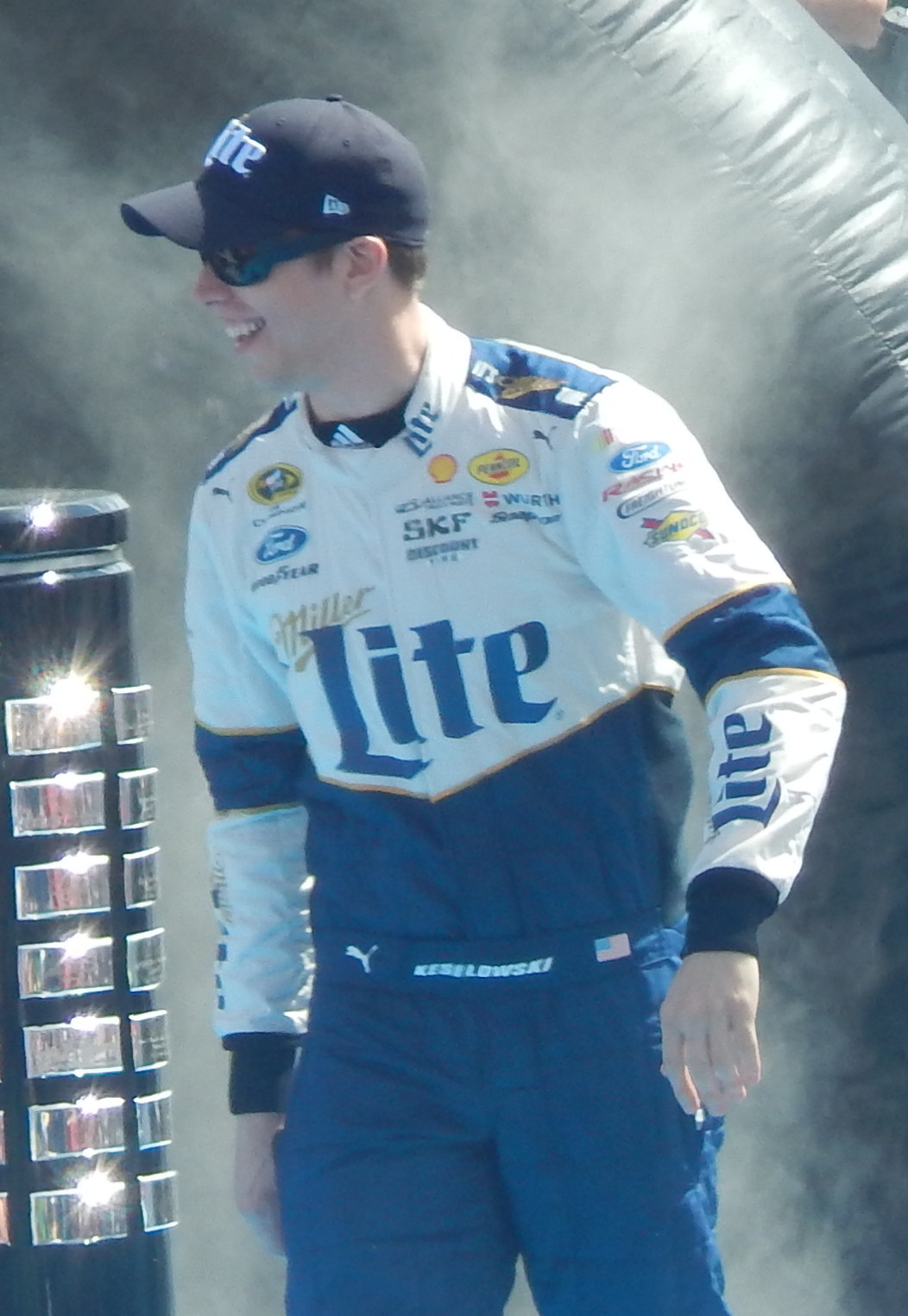
Brad Keselowski scored the pole for the race.

Brad Keselowski won the pole for the race with a time of 27.621 and a speed of 195.503 mph (314.632 km/h). He said afterwards that he was "still kind of shaking. I’ve always felt like Darlington is the hardest qualifying session of the year, but this is harder. You’re right on the fringe of being wide open.” After qualifying 14th, Dale Earnhardt Jr. said that his car "was tight in the middle of 3 and 4 all day, but we were trying to work on it ... and I just barely missed. I liked some things I saw today, and I think the car has good speed.” Casey Mears went to a backup car after hitting the wall in qualifying. As a result, he started the race from the rear of the field.

=== Qualifying results ===
Pos	No.	Driver	Team	Manufacturer	R1	R2	R3
1	2	Brad Keselowski	Team Penske	Ford	27.678	27.720	27.621
2	19	Carl Edwards	Joe Gibbs Racing	Toyota	27.764	27.691	27.628
3	18	Kyle Busch	Joe Gibbs Racing	Toyota	27.939	27.746	27.717
4	4	Kevin Harvick	Stewart–Haas Racing	Chevrolet	27.757	27.792	27.727
5	11	Denny Hamlin	Joe Gibbs Racing	Toyota	27.806	27.705	27.730
6	24	Jeff Gordon	Hendrick Motorsports	Chevrolet	27.997	27.800	27.746
7	78	Martin Truex Jr.	Furniture Row Racing	Chevrolet	28.009	27.771	27.782
8	21	Ryan Blaney (i)	Wood Brothers Racing	Ford	27.934	27.669	27.783
9	41	Kurt Busch	Stewart–Haas Racing	Chevrolet	27.830	27.757	27.787
10	31	Ryan Newman	Richard Childress Racing	Chevrolet	27.908	27.819	27.792
11	20	Matt Kenseth	Joe Gibbs Racing	Toyota	27.892	27.782	27.812
12	16	Greg Biffle	Roush Fenway Racing	Ford	27.997	27.818	27.855
13	27	Paul Menard	Richard Childress Racing	Chevrolet	27.801	27.827	—
14	22	Joey Logano	Team Penske	Ford	27.992	27.830	—
15	88	Dale Earnhardt Jr.	Hendrick Motorsports	Chevrolet	27.880	27.835	—
16	33	Brian Scott (i)	Hillman-Circle Sport LLC	Chevrolet	27.954	27.836	—
17	14	Tony Stewart	Stewart–Haas Racing	Chevrolet	28.024	27.859	—
18	17	Ricky Stenhouse Jr.	Roush Fenway Racing	Ford	28.020	27.872	—
19	6	Trevor Bayne	Roush Fenway Racing	Ford	27.996	27.876	—
20	42	Kyle Larson	Chip Ganassi Racing	Chevrolet	27.971	27.909	—
21	48	Jimmie Johnson	Hendrick Motorsports	Chevrolet	27.947	27.930	—
22	55	David Ragan	Michael Waltrip Racing	Toyota	27.966	27.934	—
23	43	Aric Almirola	Richard Petty Motorsports	Ford	28.049	27.974	—
24	5	Kasey Kahne	Hendrick Motorsports	Chevrolet	28.037	27.974	—
25	3	Austin Dillon	Richard Childress Racing	Chevrolet	28.075	—	—
26	15	Clint Bowyer	Michael Waltrip Racing	Toyota	28.155	—	—
27	47	A. J. Allmendinger	JTG Daugherty Racing	Chevrolet	28.167	—	—
28	1	Jamie McMurray	Chip Ganassi Racing	Chevrolet	28.168	—	—
29	10	Danica Patrick	Stewart–Haas Racing	Chevrolet	28.208	—	—
30	51	Justin Allgaier	HScott Motorsports	Chevrolet	28.273	—	—
31	9	Sam Hornish Jr.	Richard Petty Motorsports	Ford	28.307	—	—
32	7	Alex Bowman	Tommy Baldwin Racing	Chevrolet	28.333	—	—
33	38	David Gilliland	Front Row Motorsports	Ford	28.415	—	—
34	83	Matt DiBenedetto (R)	BK Racing	Toyota	28.492	—	—
35	34	Brett Moffitt (R)	Front Row Motorsports	Ford	28.498	—	—
36	26	J. J. Yeley (i)	BK Racing	Toyota	28.523	—	—
37	46	Michael Annett	HScott Motorsports	Chevrolet	28.549	—	—
38	13	Casey Mears (Note: Casey Mears went to a backup car after hitting the wall in qualifying. As a result, he started the race from the rear of the field.)	Germain Racing	Chevrolet	28.572	—	—
39	35	Cole Whitt	Front Row Motorsports	Ford	28.748	—	—
40	23	Jeb Burton (R)	BK Racing	Toyota	28.935	—	—
41	40	Landon Cassill (i)	Hillman-Circle Sport LLC	Chevrolet	29.092	—	—
42	98	Reed Sorenson	Premium Motorsports	Ford	29.142	—	—
43	32	Will Kimmel	Go FAS Racing	Ford	29.147	—	—
Failed to qualify
44	62	Timmy Hill (i)	Premium Motorsports	Chevrolet	29.156	—	—
Official qualifying results

== Race ==
=== First half ===
==== Start ====
Under clear blue Kansas skies, Brad Keselowski led the field to the green flag at 2:34 p.m. He began pulling away from the field after the first five laps. After 15 laps, Kevin Harvick cued his radio to say he thought there was a vibration in the car and that "it's going to blow up." Despite this, he passed Keselowski for the lead in turn 4 on lap 29. The first caution of the race flew on lap 30 for a single-car wreck in turn 2. J. J. Yeley suffered a right-front tire blowout and slammed the wall. After making his stop, crew chief Rodney Childers told Harvick that the cause of the vibration was a loose right-rear wheel weight. This caution period was longer than normal as drivers were radioing into NASCAR race control that the oil hadn't been thoroughly cleaned up.

The race restarted on lap 40. Joey Logano passed Harvick on the outside in turn 4 to take the lead on lap 51. The second caution of the race flew on lap 64 for a single-car spin on the backstretch. Exiting turn 4, Tony Stewart got loose and spun out. Carl Edwards exited pit road with the race lead after taking just right-side tires.

==== Second quarter ====
The race restarted on lap 70. Matt Kenseth passed his teammate on the outside in turn 2 to take the lead on lap 73. The third caution of the race flew on lap 109 for a single-car spin on the backstretch. Exiting turn 2, Kyle Larson got loose and spun out. Kenseth and Logano swapped the lead on pit road, but Kenseth left pit road with it.

The race restarted on lap 115. The fourth caution of the race flew on lap 155 for a single-car wreck in turn 1. Austin Dillon suffered a right-front tire blowout and slammed the wall. Matt Kenseth and Joey Logano swapped the lead on pit road, but Kenseth exited pit road with it.

=== Second half ===
==== Halfway ====
The race restarted on lap 160. Dale Earnhardt Jr. made an unscheduled stop on lap 165 for a loose wheel. After the race, he said that he felt "pretty sure we had an issue. We had a lot of wheels shaking, tires shaking because of the wheels spinning inside the tire. Every set we had today except for one didn’t shake. Every set shook, but it’s a completely different kind of thing when the wheel is not tight. We don’t know which one it was we came in so quick it didn’t beat up the wheel enough to give us a real indication of which one it was. I knew we needed to come down pit road. We had a fast car, just never really had good track position and got behind. We didn’t come here to run second or top five we don’t need that we need a win. We had to try to go out there and win and we just got behind.” The fifth caution of the race flew on lap 170 for a single-car wreck in turn 2. Clint Bowyer got loose, overcorrected and slammed the wall head-on. Describing the incident, he said that he had been "following Gordon there and I started to catch him back. I went in and he kind of took my line away and I tried to pull down and as soon as my headlight got out and got some air in it, man it turned me.”

The race restarted with 89 laps to go. Joey Logano drove underneath Kenseth on the backstretch to take back the lead with 88 laps to go. Kenseth didn't allow him to drive away, however, and took back the lead with 81 laps to go. Logano passed him back to take the lead again with 80 laps to go. The two of them drag-raced through the tri-oval with Kenseth winning the battle with 72 laps to go.

==== Fourth quarter ====
"That's the first time that's happened for us. You don't want that kind of thing to happen, but I felt like we had a third or fourth–place car, and our fuel mileage wasn't very good and we had to pit a couple laps before those guys were, and then we were going to have to stretch it on the next one. Basically you had to tell the gasman to try to stay with the car as long as you can and get absolutely as many drops of fuel in there as you can, and it just got hung up as we were leaving. Even what he did following the car out, it still wasn't full, so that's part of it."

— Rodney Childers speaking on the gas can mishap.

Martin Truex Jr. kicked off the final cycle of pit stops with 54 laps to go. Matt Kenseth surrendered the lead to make his final pit stop with 53 laps to go and handed the lead to Jimmie Johnson. He pitted with 52 laps to go and handed the lead to Ryan Blaney. Kevin Harvick was tagged for removing equipment from his pit box – the fuel can got stuck in the fuel receptor and slid out of the pit box – and was forced to serve a stop and go penalty. He said after the race that he was "lucky to come out of it as good as we did with our team. We didn't have a great weekend, a lot of things falling on and off, and now we've got to go to Talladega and have a good week. All in all, it could have been a lot worse, and everybody kept digging." Martin Truex Jr. was tagged for an uncontrolled tire and was forced to serve a drive-through penalty. After the race, Truex said that his team had a "tough day. We were in good shape before the penalty. We fought hard on the car all day got much better right when we got the penalty. We were fast at the end, but not enough time to get back up there." Blaney made his stop with 47 laps to go and handed the lead to Carl Edwards. He pitted with 43 laps to go and handed the lead to Paul Menard. He pitted with 37 laps to go and the lead cycled back to Matt Kenseth.

The sixth caution of the race flew with 24 laps to go for a single-car wreck in turn 2. In front of race leader Matt Kenseth, Justin Allgaier got loose and slammed the wall. Jimmie Johnson opted not to pit and assumed the lead.

The race restarted with 20 laps to go. Johnson was no match for Kenseth on old tires who passed him with ease for the lead. However, Joey Logano was hot on his tail in the closing laps. Kenseth blocked Logano's advance going into turn 3 with six laps to go. Coming to five to go, Kenseth ran into lap traffic and it allowed Logano to close in and Kenseth went up the track to block him again. Rounding turn 1, Logano turned him and send him spinning. This brought out the seventh caution of the race with five to go. After the race, Logano said that the incident was "good hard racing. He raced me hard, so I raced him hard back. The fact that we’re the only team that can relax now is going to pay big dividends going into Martinsville. To make a lot of these guys nervous going into Talladega is part of the strategy." Kenseth spoke on the incident saying that it's difficult "to drive a car with the rear tires off the ground. I was moving around the best I could, Joey (Logano) was a lot tighter, a lot faster on the short run, but we were so much better on the long run. I could still kind of get up to the top and get a run and get around him. We caught those two lapped cars, ‘Crazy’ (spotter) told me I was clear and I was, I pulled up in front of him and he just lifted my tires off the ground and he wrecked us."

===== Green-White-Checker =====
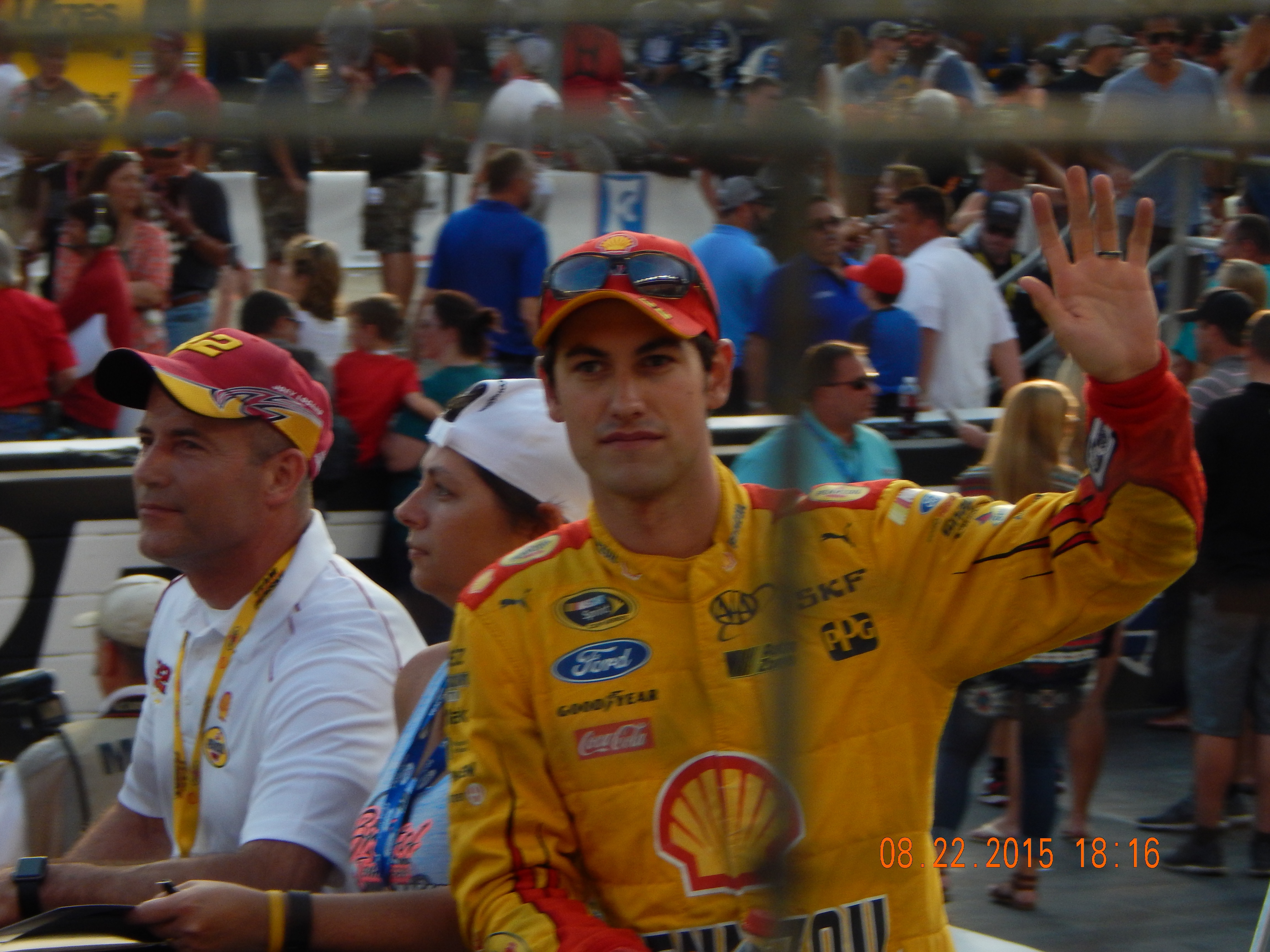
Joey Logano, seen here at Bristol Motor Speedway, scored his 13th career victory at Kansas.

The race restarted with two laps to go. Joey Logano drove off to score the victory.

== Post-race ==
=== Driver comments ===
Logano said afterwards that the race "was a fun race. What a great Shell/Pennzoil Ford. I couldn’t be prouder of what this team is doing now...That was good, hard racing. We race each other really hard. I feel like I got fenced twice down the straightaways. He raced me hard so I raced him hard back. It’s just hard racing. That’s the way I race. If I get raced like that I’ll race the same way. I just couldn't be more proud of this team. To be sitting in such a good position going into Talladega makes us feel real, real good. The fact that we’re the only team that can relax right now, is gonna pay big dividends once we get to Martinsville. Everyone is a little bit nervous. Our goal is to still win the race. Even though we've moved on to the next round, our goal is still to win that race and try to get some guys nervous for next week. That's the kind of strategy of this Chase.”

Following a seventh–place finish, Ryan Blaney said that it wasn't "a bad run for us. We started off pretty good, we were running up front towards the start of the day and we kind of lost the track position a little bit towards the middle of that race. Our car kind of went away; some of that was traffic and the other part was kind of handling. “But (the team) did a good job of getting us back where we needed to be, at the end of the race, where it mattered.”

After placing 10th in his 20th and final career start at Kansas Speedway, Jeff Gordon said that his car was "absolutely horrible. We were absolutely as far off as you could be. I don’t know. The thing qualified amazing and ever since we put it in race trim it just is not comfortable, hasn’t felt good, and we’ve struggled with it. That was one of the hardest top 10s I’ve ever had to go through. I’m proud of the team. They fought hard and that’s why we’re where we’re at. But gosh, that was ugly.”

Speaking on the incident with five laps to go, Matt Kenseth – who finished 14th – said that Logano "was a little bit tighter on that short run than I was and I couldn’t get away from him. All day we had him pretty good. I still thought I was going to be able to stay in front of him. I saw those lapped cars coming and tried getting a couple of runs off the top there and I was plenty clear, got up in front of him and he just decided to take us out.” He also added that he "pulled up in front of him, and he lifted my tires off the ground and wrecked me. I won't talk to Joey. I don't have anything to talk to him about really. I mean, you make decisions every minute behind the wheel. To me, strategically, that doesn't seem like such a great decision for him. But that's how they wanted to win. ... I'm one of the only guys that hasn't been into it yet with Joey. I always raced him with a ton of respect. I actually have been one of his biggest fans. I'm not anymore."

=== Media comments ===
"While many observers insist on placing all the blame on one party or another, Sunday’s fireworks were a simple case of two drivers racing aggressively and giving no quarter with an important race on the line. Logano wanted to win, while Kenseth needed to win, in order to salvage his fading championship hopes. Two tough customers laid it all on the line in the final laps, knowing that one of them might not make it to the checkered flag.

There is no question that Kenseth blocked Logano repeatedly over the final few laps. The Joe Gibbs Racing driver admitted as much after the race. There is also no question that Logano had a wheel alongside Kenseth’s right-rear corner on Lap 249, only to be squeezed into the SAFER barrier.

That’s what stock car racing is all about; two drivers racing their guts out in pursuit of the checkered flag, with no excuses and no apologies. Kenseth did what he had to do to maintain the lead Sunday, and Logano did what he had to do in response."

— MRN turn announcer Dave Moody giving his take on Joey Logano spinning Matt Kenseth out.

Members of the NASCAR media gave their take on the incident involving Matt Kenseth and Joey Logano. Dave Moody of the Motor Racing Network, who had the call on the incident for the radio network, said that "Sunday’s fireworks were a simple case of two drivers racing aggressively and giving no quarter with an important race on the line" and that it was "what stock car racing is all about; two drivers racing their guts out in pursuit of the checkered flag, with no excuses and no apologies. Kenseth did what he had to do to maintain the lead Sunday, and Logano did what he had to do in response."

Larry McReynolds of Fox Sports said that he didn't "see anything wrong that went on there at the end of the race Sunday at Kansas. Naturally, Matt doesn't see it that way and trust me, I totally get it. The man was desperate to get the win to guarantee that he and his team moved onto the next round of the Chase."

Darrell Waltrip of Fox Sports said that he "didn't see anything wrong with what happened. Matt needed to win that race to have any chance to advance to the next Chase round. True, Joey had already punched his ticket to the next round two weeks ago winning at Charlotte. Sure he could have played it safe, backed off and finished second to Matt but why back off? He had a fast race car. The kid is paid to win races for his sponsors, owner and team, plus don't lose sight of this: If he backs off and lets Matt win, then he's going to have to face Matt and his extremely fast Toyota in the next round of the Chase. If you have a chance to eliminate a major competitor for the championship, then that's the smart play. Simply backing off and letting Matt win really isn't a good idea in the big picture.

Jerry Jordan of Frontstretch.com said that the actions of Logano proved he "is afraid of what the Toyota driver is capable of and that he wanted to do all he could to ensure they wouldn’t battle each other in the final race at Homestead-Miami Speedway."

Nate Ryan of NBC Sports said that while there's "no alliterative witticism in the NASCAR vernacular to describe the practice of deliberately impeding another driver’s progress (blocking)," there's "one truism about the maneuver" in that "[i]t comes with consequences.

In ESPN.com's weekly Turn 4 series, five of their motorsports writers answered the question of whether "that Joey Logano dump of Matt Kenseth 'quintessential NASCAR,' as Brian France said it was."

Ricky Craven said plainly that while what happened was great, he's "not of the opinion one driver spinning another for the win can be considered 'quintessential NASCAR.' Ricky Rudd would have 24 wins associated with his Cup career, except a win was taken from him because NASCAR declared his bump of Davey Allison on the final lap at Sonoma a foul. What we saw from Joey and Matt may be an example of 'quintessential Chase,' but not NASCAR."

Ryan McGhee said he doesn't know if he "would go that far", but he "had no problem with it...I think the people that do have a problem with it (at least those who aren't Matt Kenseth) are swayed more by the names involved than what actually happened. If that had been Dale Junior instead of Logano and Kyle Busch instead of Kenseth, everyone else would be saying what France said."

John Oreovicz's answer to the question was a simple "yes" and noted that many of the historic moments in NASCAR did "involve contact and controversy -- the '79 Daytona 500, Richard Petty and David Pearson banging their way to the line a few years earlier, or much more recently, Brad Keselowski's bump and run on Jeff Gordon at Texas last year. Dale Earnhardt's legend was made by the style of aggressive driving that Logano demonstrated on Kenseth, and that's the kind of stuff that France and his marketing executives wish would happen a lot more often."

Bob Pockrass differed with Oreovicz with a simple "no" and that he considers "quintessential NASCAR" to be "Ricky Craven-Kurt Busch at Darlington. Logano was blocked a few times and he made a decision to hold his line to force the issue and dump Kenseth. He didn't clearly have the position and he didn't make a mistake or lose control of his car. It wasn't out-of-bounds dirty, but it wasn't clean. If the points were reversed and Logano had to win to advance, it would have been viewed with much more understanding. As Kurt Busch said Tuesday: 'I'd hate to be Logano at this point because you can win one race. You have got five more after that.'"

Marty Smith said "sure" and Logano technically "didn't wall Kenseth. He put a bumper to him. If Matt wins that race, Joey has to deal with Matt the rest of the way. And Matt can win anywhere. If I'm Kenseth, there's no way Logano wins a championship. But Kenseth is nicer than I am. What Logano did is fine, as long as he knows he has one coming and doesn't moan about it when Kenseth sends him. You heard Logano in Victory Lane at Kansas: he said he was walled twice and wasn't going to stand for it. All's fair when the checkers are in the air."

== Race results ==
Pos	No.	Driver	Team	Manufacturer	Laps	Points
1	22	Joey Logano	Team Penske	Ford	269	47
2	11	Denny Hamlin	Joe Gibbs Racing	Toyota	269	42
3	48	Jimmie Johnson	Hendrick Motorsports	Chevrolet	269	42
4	5	Kasey Kahne	Hendrick Motorsports	Chevrolet	269	40
5	18	Kyle Busch	Joe Gibbs Racing	Toyota	269	39
6	41	Kurt Busch	Stewart–Haas Racing	Chevrolet	269	38
7	21	Ryan Blaney (i)	Wood Brothers Racing	Ford	269	0
8	19	Carl Edwards	Joe Gibbs Racing	Toyota	269	37
9	2	Brad Keselowski	Team Penske	Ford	269	36
10	24	Jeff Gordon	Hendrick Motorsports	Chevrolet	269	34
11	31	Ryan Newman	Richard Childress Racing	Chevrolet	269	33
12	33	Brian Scott (i)	Hillman-Circle Sport LLC	Chevrolet	269	0
13	17	Ricky Stenhouse Jr.	Roush Fenway Racing	Ford	269	31
14	20	Matt Kenseth	Joe Gibbs Racing	Toyota	269	32
15	78	Martin Truex Jr.	Furniture Row Racing	Chevrolet	269	29
16	4	Kevin Harvick	Stewart–Haas Racing	Chevrolet	268	29
17	16	Greg Biffle	Roush Fenway Racing	Ford	268	27
18	6	Trevor Bayne	Roush Fenway Racing	Ford	268	26
19	27	Paul Menard	Richard Childress Racing	Chevrolet	268	26
20	1	Jamie McMurray	Chip Ganassi Racing	Chevrolet	268	24
21	88	Dale Earnhardt Jr.	Hendrick Motorsports	Chevrolet	267	23
22	10	Danica Patrick	Stewart–Haas Racing	Chevrolet	267	22
23	13	Casey Mears	Germain Racing	Chevrolet	267	22
24	43	Aric Almirola	Richard Petty Motorsports	Ford	267	20
25	55	David Ragan	Michael Waltrip Racing	Toyota	266	19
26	51	Justin Allgaier	HScott Motorsports	Chevrolet	266	18
27	47	A. J. Allmendinger	JTG Daugherty Racing	Chevrolet	265	17
28	9	Sam Hornish Jr.	Richard Petty Motorsports	Ford	265	16
29	42	Kyle Larson	Chip Ganassi Racing	Chevrolet	265	15
30	83	Matt DiBenedetto (R)	BK Racing	Toyota	265	14
31	7	Alex Bowman	Tommy Baldwin Racing	Chevrolet	264	13
32	34	Brett Moffitt (R)	Front Row Motorsports	Ford	264	12
33	35	Cole Whitt	Front Row Motorsports	Ford	264	11
34	46	Michael Annett	HScott Motorsports	Chevrolet	263	10
35	14	Tony Stewart	Stewart–Haas Racing	Chevrolet	263	9
36	38	David Gilliland	Front Row Motorsports	Ford	262	8
37	23	Jeb Burton (R)	BK Racing	Toyota	260	7
38	98	Reed Sorenson	Premium Motorsports	Ford	258	6
39	32	Will Kimmel	Go FAS Racing	Ford	255	5
40	15	Clint Bowyer	Michael Waltrip Racing	Toyota	170	4
41	3	Austin Dillon	Richard Childress Racing	Chevrolet	154	3
42	26	J. J. Yeley (i)	BK Racing	Toyota	144	0
43	40	Landon Cassill (i)	Hillman-Circle Sport LLC	Chevrolet	127	0
Official Hollywood Casino 400 results

=== Race statistics ===
- 21 lead changes among 9 different drivers
- 7 cautions for 39 laps
- Time of race: 2 hours, 58 minutes, 22 seconds
- Average speed: 135.732 mph (218.439 km/h)
- Joey Logano took home $377,023 in winnings

Lap Leaders
Laps	Leader
1-28	Brad Keselowski
29-49	Kevin Harvick
50-66	Joey Logano
67-68	Casey Mears
69-71	Carl Edwards
72-109	Matt Kenseth
110	Joey Logano
111-155	Matt Kenseth
156	Joey Logano
157-177	Matt Kenseth
178-185	Joey Logano
186	Matt Kenseth
187-194	Joey Logano
195-213	Matt Kenseth
214	Jimmie Johnson
215-219	Ryan Blaney (i)
220-222	Carl Edwards
223-229	Paul Menard
230-243	Matt Kenseth
244-247	Jimmie Johnson
248-262	Matt Kenseth
263-269	Joey Logano

Total laps led
Leader	Laps
Matt Kenseth	153
Joey Logano	42
Brad Keselowski	28
Kevin Harvick	21
Paul Menard	7
Carl Edwards	6
Jimmie Johnson	5
Ryan Blaney (i)	5
Paul Menard	2

==== Race awards ====
- Coors Light Pole Award: Brad Keselowski (27.621, 195.503 mph (314.632 km/h)
- 3M Lap Leader: Matt Kenseth (153 laps)
- American Ethanol Green Flag Restart Award: Joey Logano
- Duralast Brakes "Bake In The Race" Award: Kevin Harvick
- Freescale "Wide Open": Jimmie Johnson
- Ingersoll Rand Power Move: Kevin Harvick (3 positions)
- MAHLE Clevite Engine Builder of the Race: Roush-Yates Engines, #22
- Mobil 1 Driver of the Race: Matt Kenseth (134.1 driver rating)
- Moog Steering and Suspension Problem Solver of The Race: Denny Hamlin (crew chief Dave Rodgers (0.160 seconds))
- NASCAR Sprint Cup Leader Bonus: Joey Logano, ($10,000)
- Sherwin-Williams Fastest Lap: Matt Kenseth (Lap 116, 29.037, 185.967 mph (299.285 km/h))
- Sunoco Rookie of The Race: Matt DiBenedetto

== Media ==
=== Television ===
NBC covered the race on the television side. Rick Allen, Jeff Burton and Steve Letarte had the call in the booth for the race. Dave Burns, Mike Massaro, Marty Snider and Kelli Stavast handled pit road on the television side.

NBC
Booth announcers	Pit reporters
Lap-by-lap: Rick Allen; Color-commentator: Jeff Burton; Color-commentator: Steve Letarte	Dave Burns; Mike Massaro; Marty Snider; Kelli Stavast

=== Radio ===
MRN had the radio call for the race, which was simulcast on Sirius XM NASCAR Radio. Joe Moore, Jeff Striegle and Rusty Wallace called the race from the booth when the field was racing down the front stretch. Dave Moody called the race from a billboard outside turn 2 when the field was racing through turns 1 and 2. Mike Bagley called the race from a billboard outside turn 3 when the field was racing through turns 3 and 4. Alex Hayden, Winston Kelley and Steve Post handled pit road on the radio side.

MRN
Booth announcers	Turn announcers	Pit reporters
Lead announcer: Joe Moore; Announcer: Jeff Striegle; Announcer: Rusty Wallace	Turns 1 & 2: Dave Moody; Turns 3 & 4: Mike Bagley	Alex Hayden; Winston Kelley; Steve Post

== Standings after the race ==
Drivers' Championship standings

	Pos	Driver	Points
	1	Joey Logano	3,095
2	2	Denny Hamlin	3,082 (–13)
2	3	Kurt Busch	3,077 (–18)
2	4	Carl Edwards	3,076 (–19)
3	5	Kevin Harvick	3,071 (–24)
1	6	Jeff Gordon	3,071 (–24)
1	7	Brad Keselowski	3,071 (–24)
5	8	Martin Truex Jr.	3,070 (–25)
1	9	Kyle Busch	3,064 (–31)
1	10	Ryan Newman	3,062 (–33)
	11	Dale Earnhardt Jr.	3,039 (–56)
	12	Matt Kenseth	3,035 (–60)
	13	Jamie McMurray	2,154 (–941)
	14	Jimmie Johnson	2,134 (–961)
	15	Paul Menard	2,109 (–986)
	16	Clint Bowyer	2,086 (–1,009)

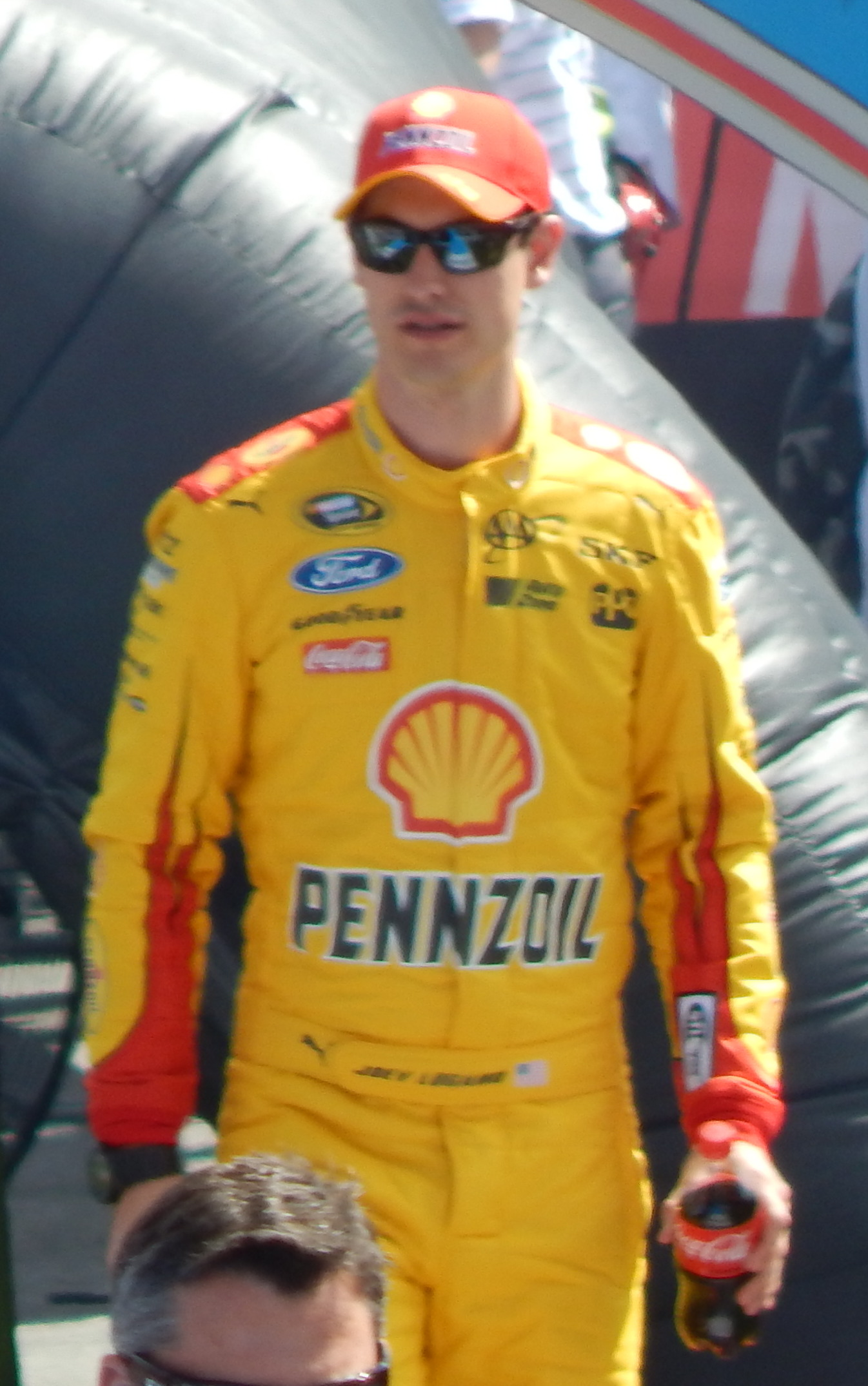
Joey Logano left Kansas with a 13–point lead over Denny Hamlin.

Manufacturers' Championship standings

	Pos	Manufacturer	Points
	1	Chevrolet	1,357
1	2	Ford	1,310 (–47)
1	3	Toyota	1,295 (–62)

- Note: Only the first sixteen positions are included for the driver standings.

== Note ==
Previous race: 2015 Bank of America 500	Sprint Cup Series; 2015 season	Next race: 2015 CampingWorld.com 500
