= 2015 myAFibRisk.com 400 =

Race details
- Race 27 of 36 in the 2015 NASCAR Sprint Cup Series
- Date: September 20, 2015
- Location: Chicagoland Speedway in Joliet, Illinois
- Course: Permanent racing facility
- Course length: 1.5 miles (2.4 km)
- Distance: 267 laps, 400.5 mi (640.8 km)
- Weather: Clear blue, sunny skies with a temperature of 71 °F (22 °C); wind out of the east at 2 mph (3.2 km/h)
- Average speed: 140.117 mph (225.496 km/h)

Pole position
Driver	Kevin Harvick	Stewart–Haas Racing
- Time: 28.675

Most laps led
Driver	Kyle Busch	Joe Gibbs Racing
- Laps: 121

Winner
No. 11	Denny Hamlin	Joe Gibbs Racing

Television in the United States
- Network: NBCSN
- Announcers: Rick Allen, Jeff Burton and Steve Letarte
- Nielsen ratings: 1.8/3 (Overnight); 2.1/4 (Final); 3.2 Million viewers

Radio in the United States
- Radio: MRN
- Booth announcers: Joe Moore, Jeff Striegle and Rusty Wallace
- Turn announcers: Dave Moody (1 & 2) and Mike Bagley (3 & 4)

The 2015 myAFibRisk.com 400 was a NASCAR Sprint Cup Series race held on September 20, 2015, at Chicagoland Speedway in Joliet, Illinois. Contested over 267 laps on the 1.5 mile (2.4 km) intermediate speedway, it was the 27th race of the 2015 NASCAR Sprint Cup Series season, the first race of the Chase and the first race of the Challenger Round. Denny Hamlin won the race, his second of the season. Carl Edwards finished second. Kurt Busch, Ryan Newman and Matt Kenseth rounded out the top–five.

Due to qualifying being rained-out, Kevin Harvick was given the first starting spot of the race. He led 10 laps before wrecking out halfway through the race and finished 42nd. Kyle Busch led a race high of 121 laps on his way to a ninth–place finish. There were 17 lead changes among 10 different drivers, as well as six caution flag periods for 28 laps.

This was Denny Hamlin's 26th career win, second of the season, first at Chicagoland Speedway and fifth at the track for Joe Gibbs Racing. The win moved Hamlin up to second in the points trailing teammate Matt Kenseth by two. Despite being the winning manufacturer, Toyota left Chicagoland trailing Chevrolet by 49–points in the manufacturer standings.

The myAFibRisk.com 400 was carried by NBC Sports on the cable/satellite NBCSN network for the American television audience. The radio broadcast for the race was carried by the Motor Racing Network and Sirius XM NASCAR Radio.

== Report ==
=== Background ===
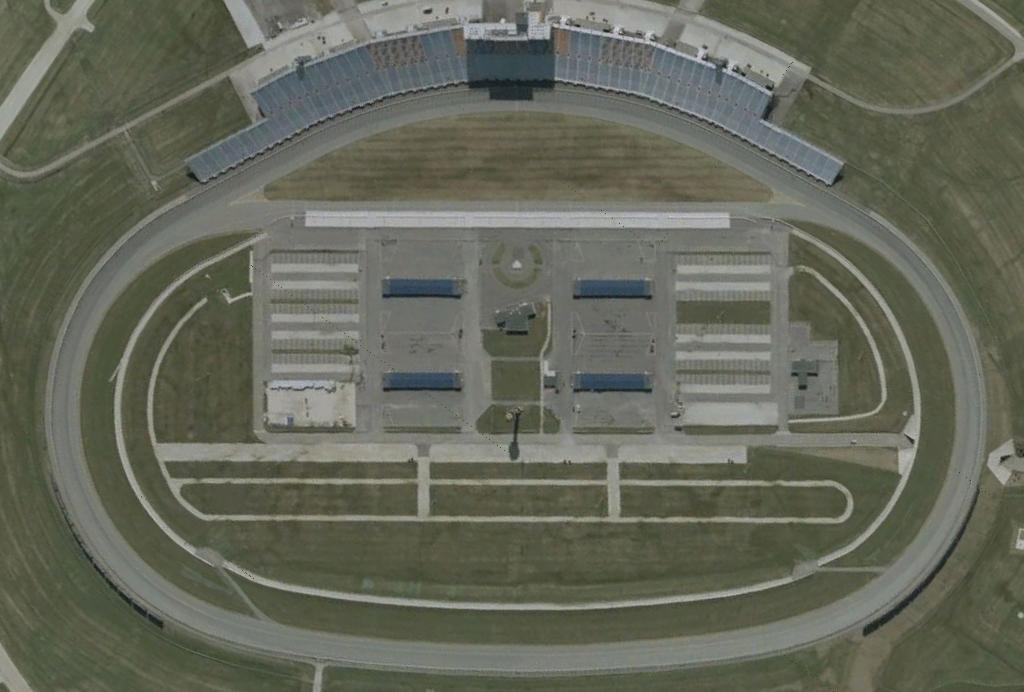
Chicagoland Speedway, the track where the race was held.

Chicagoland Speedway is a 1.500 mi (2.414 km) tri-oval intermediate speedway in Joliet, Illinois. Jimmie Johnson entered Chicagoland tied with Kyle Busch and Matt Kenseth for the points lead at 2,012–points. Joey Logano entered three–points back. Kevin Harvick, Dale Earnhardt Jr., Kurt Busch and Carl Edwards entered tied for fifth six–points back. Brad Keselowski, Martin Truex Jr. and Denny Hamlin entered tied for ninth nine–points back. Jamie McMurray, Jeff Gordon, Ryan Newman, Paul Menard and Clint Bowyer entered tied for 12th 12–points back.

==== Change to restart officiating ====
Following complaints of Matt Kenseth jumping the final restart at Richmond, NASCAR decided to add a camera feed and official with the sole purpose of monitoring the restart zone.

==== NASCAR record ====
When the green flag flies on Sunday, Jeff Gordon – who made his first career Sprint Cup Series start in the 1992 Hooters 500 at what was then Atlanta International Raceway (now Atlanta Motor Speedway) – tied Ricky Rudd's record for most consecutive starts at 788. The 23–year veteran of the sport will break the tie next weekend at New Hampshire Motor Speedway. "I’ve got to get through this weekend first," he said. "That’s one of those things where I feel a little strange talking about it because I do appreciate and respect the safety of this sport. (That) side can be taken away from you at any time. I want to break that record. I think it’s a huge accomplishment because it’s not easy to do. It’s easier today because the sport is safer. I look at Ricky Rudd and what he went through to make it. That is pretty extraordinary. I can’t quite compare that."

==== Entry list ====
The entry list for the myAFibRisk.com 400 was released on Sunday, September 13 at 11:49 a.m. Eastern time. Forty-six cars were entered for the race. All but Ryan Blaney in the No. 21 Wood Brothers Racing Ford were entered for the previous week's race at Richmond. The two driver changes for this weekend's race were Travis Kvapil returning to the No. 30 Chevrolet for The Motorsports Group and Josh Wise returning to the No. 32 Go FAS Racing Ford.

No.	Driver	Team	Manufacturer
1	Jamie McMurray	Chip Ganassi Racing	Chevrolet
2	Brad Keselowski (PC3)	Team Penske	Ford
3	Austin Dillon	Richard Childress Racing	Chevrolet
4	Kevin Harvick (PC1)	Stewart–Haas Racing	Chevrolet
5	Kasey Kahne	Hendrick Motorsports	Chevrolet
6	Trevor Bayne	Roush Fenway Racing	Ford
7	Alex Bowman	Tommy Baldwin Racing	Chevrolet
9	Sam Hornish Jr.	Richard Petty Motorsports	Ford
10	Danica Patrick	Stewart–Haas Racing	Chevrolet
11	Denny Hamlin	Joe Gibbs Racing	Toyota
13	Casey Mears	Germain Racing	Chevrolet
14	Tony Stewart (PC4)	Stewart–Haas Racing	Chevrolet
15	Clint Bowyer	Michael Waltrip Racing	Toyota
16	Greg Biffle	Roush Fenway Racing	Ford
17	Ricky Stenhouse Jr.	Roush Fenway Racing	Ford
18	Kyle Busch	Joe Gibbs Racing	Toyota
19	Carl Edwards	Joe Gibbs Racing	Toyota
20	Matt Kenseth (PC6)	Joe Gibbs Racing	Toyota
21	Ryan Blaney (i)	Wood Brothers Racing	Ford
22	Joey Logano	Team Penske	Ford
23	David Ragan (R)	BK Racing	Toyota
24	Jeff Gordon (PC7)	Hendrick Motorsports	Chevrolet
26	J. J. Yeley (i)	BK Racing	Toyota
27	Paul Menard	Richard Childress Racing	Chevrolet
30	Travis Kvapil (i)	The Motorsports Group	Chevrolet
31	Ryan Newman	Richard Childress Racing	Chevrolet
32	Josh Wise	Go FAS Racing	Ford
33	Brian Scott (i)	Hillman-Circle Sport LLC	Chevrolet
34	Brett Moffitt (R)	Front Row Motorsports	Ford
35	Cole Whitt	Front Row Motorsports	Ford
38	David Gilliland	Front Row Motorsports	Ford
40	Landon Cassill (i)	Hillman-Circle Sport LLC	Chevrolet
41	Kurt Busch (PC5)	Stewart–Haas Racing	Chevrolet
42	Kyle Larson	Chip Ganassi Racing	Chevrolet
43	Aric Almirola	Richard Petty Motorsports	Ford
46	Michael Annett	HScott Motorsports	Chevrolet
47	A. J. Allmendinger	JTG Daugherty Racing	Chevrolet
48	Jimmie Johnson (PC2)	Hendrick Motorsports	Chevrolet
51	Justin Allgaier	HScott Motorsports	Chevrolet
55	David Ragan	Michael Waltrip Racing	Toyota
62	Reed Sorenson	Premium Motorsports	Chevrolet
78	Martin Truex Jr.	Furniture Row Racing	Chevrolet
83	Matt DiBenedetto (R)	BK Racing	Toyota
88	Dale Earnhardt Jr.	Hendrick Motorsports	Chevrolet
95	Michael McDowell	Leavine Family Racing	Ford
98	Timmy Hill (i)	Premium Motorsports	Ford
Official initial entry list
Official final entry list

Key	Meaning
(R)	Rookie
(i)	Ineligible for points
(PC#)	Past champions provisional

== Practice ==
=== First practice ===
Kevin Harvick was the fastest in the first practice session with a time of 28.675 and a speed of 188.317 mph (303.067 km/h).

Pos	No.	Driver	Team	Manufacturer	Time	Speed
1	4	Kevin Harvick	Stewart–Haas Racing	Chevrolet	28.675	188.317
2	22	Joey Logano	Team Penske	Ford	28.737	187.911
3	2	Brad Keselowski	Team Penske	Ford	28.750	187.826
Official first practice results

=== Second practice ===
Martin Truex Jr. was the fastest in the second practice session with a time of 29.458 and a speed of 183.312 mph (295.012 km/h).

Pos	No.	Driver	Team	Manufacturer	Time	Speed
1	78	Martin Truex Jr.	Furniture Row Racing	Chevrolet	29.458	183.312
2	11	Denny Hamlin	Joe Gibbs Racing	Toyota	29.607	182.389
3	24	Jeff Gordon	Hendrick Motorsports	Chevrolet	29.698	181.830
Official second practice results

=== Final practice ===
Martin Truex Jr. was the fastest in the final practice session with a time of 29.213 and a speed of 184.849 mph (297.486 km/h).

Pos	No.	Driver	Team	Manufacturer	Time	Speed
1	78	Martin Truex Jr.	Furniture Row Racing	Chevrolet	29.213	184.849
2	2	Brad Keselowski	Team Penske	Ford	29.350	183.986
3	20	Matt Kenseth	Joe Gibbs Racing	Toyota	29.356	183.949
Official final practice results

== Qualifying ==
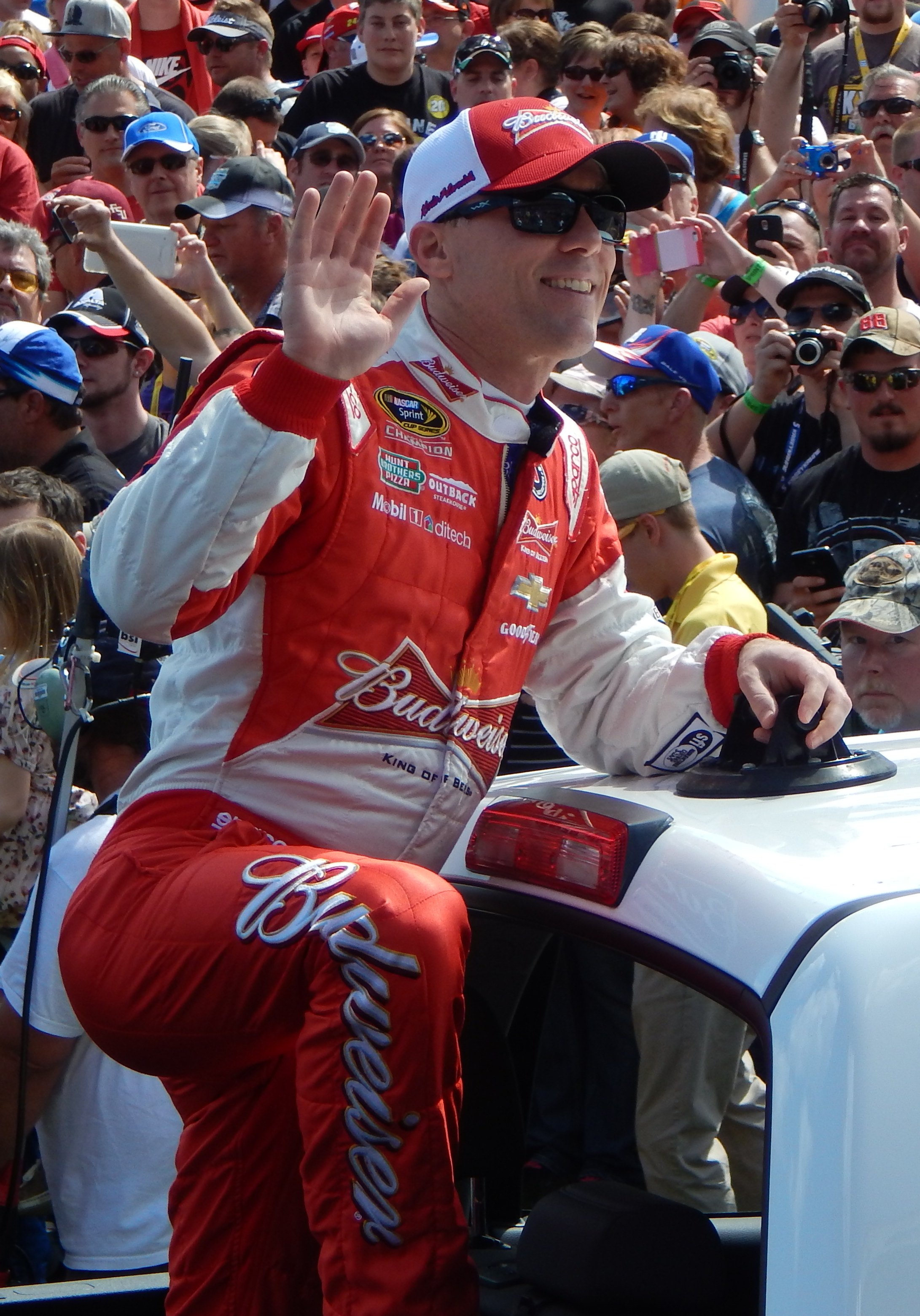
Kevin Harvick, seen here at the 2015 Daytona 500, was awarded the first starting spot after qualifying was rained out.

Three rounds of knockout qualifying took place at 6:45 p.m., but heavy rain forced the session to be cancelled and the starting lineup was set by first practice times according to the NASCAR rulebook. As a result, Kevin Harvick was awarded the first starting spot for the race. He was joined on the front row by Joey Logano. "We haven’t been in race trim yet," Logano said. "We stayed in qualifying trim all day today and I felt like it was qualifying during practice. We were really trying to top the charts. We really felt like that was where we would be starting at the end of practice. Obviously this storm is huge and we didn’t have a shot in hell of making qualifying happen.” “It is a lot better than last year when we started 25th," Brad Keselowski – who started third – said. "We will take that and move on. The car has been pretty good so far so I feel good about that." Ryan Blaney, Travis Kvapil and Michael McDowell failed to qualify for the race.

=== Qualifying results ===
Pos	No.	Driver	Team	Manufacturer	Time	Speed
1	4	Kevin Harvick	Stewart–Haas Racing	Chevrolet	28.675	188.317
2	22	Joey Logano	Team Penske	Ford	28.737	187.911
3	2	Brad Keselowski	Team Penske	Ford	28.750	187.826
4	78	Martin Truex Jr.	Furniture Row Racing	Chevrolet	28.754	187.800
5	3	Austin Dillon	Richard Childress Racing	Chevrolet	28.760	187.761
6	31	Ryan Newman	Richard Childress Racing	Chevrolet	28.813	187.415
7	18	Kyle Busch	Joe Gibbs Racing	Toyota	28.893	186.896
8	5	Kasey Kahne	Hendrick Motorsports	Chevrolet	28.922	186.709
9	41	Kurt Busch	Stewart–Haas Racing	Chevrolet	28.958	186.477
10	24	Jeff Gordon	Hendrick Motorsports	Chevrolet	28.959	186.471
11	48	Jimmie Johnson	Hendrick Motorsports	Chevrolet	28.961	186.458
12	20	Matt Kenseth	Joe Gibbs Racing	Toyota	28.967	186.419
13	1	Jamie McMurray	Chip Ganassi Racing	Chevrolet	29.017	186.098
14	19	Carl Edwards	Joe Gibbs Racing	Toyota	29.018	186.091
15	47	A. J. Allmendinger	JTG Daugherty Racing	Chevrolet	29.027	186.034
16	27	Paul Menard	Richard Childress Racing	Chevrolet	29.028	186.027
17	16	Greg Biffle	Roush Fenway Racing	Ford	29.033	185.995
18	42	Kyle Larson	Chip Ganassi Racing	Chevrolet	29.051	185.880
19	88	Dale Earnhardt Jr.	Hendrick Motorsports	Chevrolet	29.055	185.854
20	43	Aric Almirola	Richard Petty Motorsports	Ford	29.055	185.854
21	33	Brian Scott (i)	Hillman-Circle Sport LLC	Chevrolet	29.061	185.816
22	9	Sam Hornish Jr.	Richard Petty Motorsports	Ford	29.067	185.778
23	14	Tony Stewart	Stewart–Haas Racing	Chevrolet	29.085	185.663
24	13	Casey Mears	Germain Racing	Chevrolet	29.159	185.192
25	10	Danica Patrick	Stewart–Haas Racing	Chevrolet	29.160	185.185
26	15	Clint Bowyer	Michael Waltrip Racing	Toyota	29.183	185.039
27	17	Ricky Stenhouse Jr.	Roush Fenway Racing	Ford	29.227	184.761
28	55	David Ragan	Michael Waltrip Racing	Toyota	29.246	184.641
29	11	Denny Hamlin	Joe Gibbs Racing	Toyota	29.275	184.458
30	6	Trevor Bayne	Roush Fenway Racing	Ford	29.457	183.318
31	51	Justin Allgaier	HScott Motorsports	Chevrolet	29.467	183.256
32	7	Alex Bowman	Tommy Baldwin Racing	Chevrolet	29.599	182.439
33	35	Cole Whitt	Front Row Motorsports	Ford	29.645	182.156
34	26	J. J. Yeley (i)	BK Racing	Toyota	29.644	182.149
35	38	David Gilliland	Front Row Motorsports	Ford	29.666	182.027
36	40	Landon Cassill (i)	Hillman-Circle Sport LLC	Chevrolet	29.686	181.904
37	46	Michael Annett	HScott Motorsports	Chevrolet	29.725	181.665
38	34	Brett Moffitt (R) (Note: Brett Moffitt started from the rear of the field for changing transmissions.)	Front Row Motorsports	Ford	29.733	181.616
39	83	Matt DiBenedetto (R)	BK Racing	Toyota	29.747	181.531
40	32	Josh Wise	Go FAS Racing	Ford	29.770	181.391
41	23	Jeb Burton (R)	BK Racing	Toyota	29.851	180.898
42	98	Reed Sorenson	Premium Motorsports	Ford	30.052	179.689
43	62	Timmy Hill (i)	Premium Motorsports	Chevrolet	30.767	175.513
Failed to qualify
44	21	Ryan Blaney (i)	Wood Brothers Racing	Ford	28.951	186.522
45	95	Michael McDowell	Leavine Family Racing	Ford	30.070	179.581
46	30	Travis Kvapil (i)	The Motorsports Group	Chevrolet	30.223	178.672
Official first practice results
Official starting lineup

== Race ==
=== First half ===
==== Start ====
Under clear blue Illinois skies, Kevin Harvick led the field to the green flag at 3:18 p.m. He edged out Joey Logano to lead the first lap. The first caution of the race flew on the second lap when A. J. Allmendinger came down across the nose of Denny Hamlin and went spinning in turn 3. Trying to avoid ramming the No. 47 car, Hamlin got loose on the high-side, spun out and slid down the race track. He didn't suffer any damage and he continued on racing.

The race restarted on lap 7. Martin Truex Jr. forced Harvick up the track to take the lead the next lap. By lap 15, Austin Dillon was pressuring him for the top spot, but got loose in turn 3 and lost the second position to Harvick. By lap 23, Harvick pulled up next to Truex and edged out front but the No. 78 car beat him back to the line. By lap 36, Kyle Busch, now in second place, began to pressure Truex for the lead. Finally, Busch slid up in front of him to take the lead on lap 47. A number of cars began hitting pit road on lap 52 and Busch hit pit road from the lead on lap 54. In a rare circumstance, the lead didn't change at all through the cycle. Alex Bowman and Carl Edwards were both tagged for speeding on pit road and they had to serve drive-through penalties.

==== Second quarter ====
When the pit cycle was over, Busch began driving away from the field. 20 laps later, Harvick began to run him down. However, lapped traffic prevented him from getting close to the leader. On lap 87, Kurt Busch, running fifth at the time, made an unscheduled stop after slamming the wall in turn 3. Despite this, the race continued under green. Another round of green flag pit stops began on lap 100 and Ky. Busch surrendered the lead to make his stop on lap 106 and handed it to Dale Earnhardt Jr. He pitted the next lap to give the lead back to Busch. Debris on the backstretch brought out the second caution of the race on lap 123.

The race restarted on lap 129. Harvick edged out Busch on the backstretch and took the lead. The third caution of the race flew on lap 130 when Dillon blew his right-front tire out and slammed the wall in turn 2. He would go on to finish 43rd 69–laps down.

=== Second half ===
==== Halfway ====
The race restarted on lap 135. Harvick spun the tires on the restart and lost the lead to Kyle Busch. Joey Logano hit the rear of Jimmie Johnson's car and forced him onto the apron. Johnson then made contact with Harvick and damaged his left-rear fender. His left-rear tire blew out and sent his car backwards into the turn 3 wall, bringing out the fourth caution on lap 137. “I got a pretty good restart and obviously (Joey Logano) and (Johnson) got a run. I just held my line and (Johnson) just slammed into the side of my door,” Harvick explained. "That was pretty much it.” “He didn’t leave me any space,” Johnson explained after the race. “He was pinning me down, and I had to get back up on the track. I wouldn’t say that what he did was any different than other situations I’ve been in like that. When you are in his position, you want to get the inside car in a bad angle so they have to lift. I was fine with lifting, but I had to get back on the race track, so I worked my way back up on the track.”

The race restarted on lap 145. Busch spun the tires on the start and lost the lead to Jeff Gordon. It was the first restart that prompted a review by NASCAR and they found that it was a clean restart. He was the first to hit pit road on lap 184 and handed the lead to Kurt Busch. Kurt pitted the next lap and give the lead to brother Kyle Busch. Kyle pitted the next lap and handed the lead to Kyle Larson. Larson pitted two laps later and handed the lead to Carl Edwards. Debris in turn 4 brought out the fifth caution of the race on lap 191. Kyle Busch opted not to pit and assumed the lead.

==== Fourth quarter ====
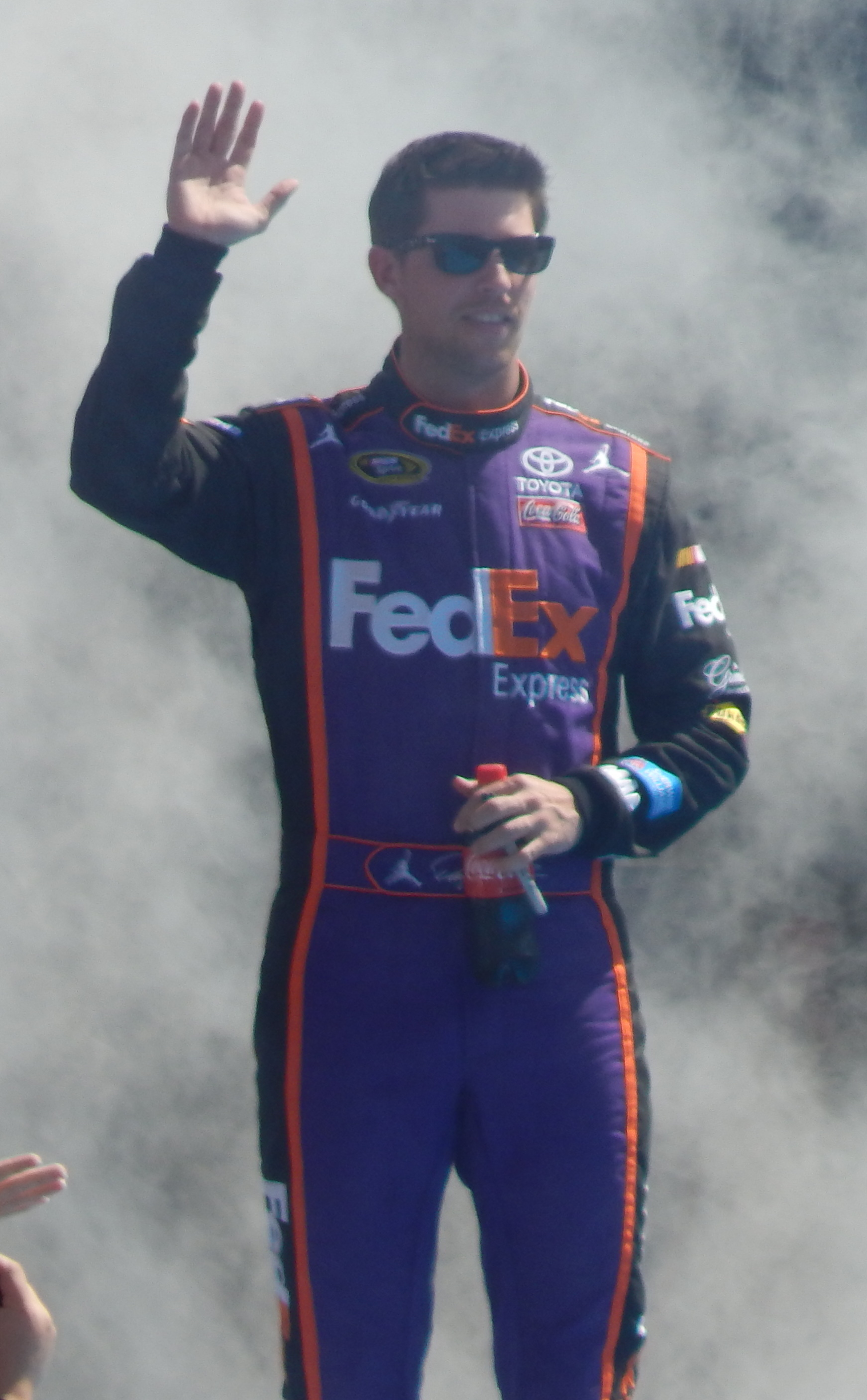
Denny Hamlin, seen here at the 2015 Daytona 500, scored his 26th career victory at Chicagoland Speedway.

The race restarted with 71 laps to go. After drag racing through the front stretch, Kurt Busch passed his brother for the lead with 46 laps to go. Edwards began the final cycle of pit stops with 29 laps to go. Kurt Busch pitted with 28 laps to go and handed the lead to Hamlin. Hamlin pitted with 24 laps to go and handed the lead to teammate Matt Kenseth. Kenseth hit pit road with 23 laps to go and the lead cycled back to Kurt Busch. Allmendinger was tagged for speeding on pit road and was forced to serve a drive-through penalty. Debris in turn 2 brought out the sixth caution of the race with 10 laps to go. The debris were pieces of a brake rotor that came from the No. 83 car of Matt DiBenedetto. "Did the yellow even need to come out? I don't even know," Kurt Busch said after the race. He, Gordon and Hamlin opted to stay out while the rest of the lead lap cars opted to pit.

The race restarted with five laps to go. Gordon got a good start on Kurt, but he was passed underneath by Hamlin, forced up the track and ultimately finished 14th. Denny drove on to score his 26th career victory.

== Post-race ==
=== Driver comments ===
"This team doesn’t give up, that’s a perfect example today," Hamlin said. "Fast race cars are what we have and that was why we were able to come back and win today from that early trouble."

"I'll tell you what, my guys just do a great job on pit road, they really do," Edwards said. "Darian never loses his cool ever. He played the game perfectly with pit strategy. Then at the end, truly, once we got into Turn 1 on the final restart, I was like, I got this thing. I got better tires than all these guys. Kurt (Busch) was unbelievable on old tires. Then I thought, Denny is mine, he's a sitting duck. He drove the wheels off of that thing. He really hung on with those tires that he had."

“...overall, I’m really proud of this team and everybody at Haas Automation and Stewart Haas Racing,” Kurt Busch said. “This Chevy was fast. It was fast enough to win. When the caution came out there at the end, I thought we had the right strategy, but we didn’t. But this is a point’s day. This is a long journey through these next 10 weeks. We weren’t given a hall pass now, through Loudon and through Dover. We’ve just got to work hard as a team and saddle-up. This isn’t just a win and take a couple of weeks off, but we had a winning car today. It’s kind of a shame. We had a good run at Fontana earlier this year and it kind of ended up the same way.”

“We had a really good car. We were good most of the race and then that one caution came out after we pitted we went a lap down,” Ryan Newman said after a fourth-place finish. “The next restart we had a bad restart and it looked like we were done and that was it.”

“I didn’t choose the right direction to go,” Dale Earnhardt Jr. said after a 12th-place finish. “I thought we would all jump to the top and go around those guys, and we’d be good. But Jeff slid up in front of us and we all had to stop and everybody was going by us on the bottom. Those late restarts with those guys up there on used tires are just going to be bad. You just have to get lucky and we didn’t get lucky. Not anything there about skill, it is all luck. ... We had a good day going and ... cautions throw all that work out the window.”

"I knew we were going to have a tough time not spinning the tires," Gordon said about the final restart after a 14th-place finish in his record-tying 788th consecutive career start. "Especially when you're on the front row. So, I was just trying to hold pace with Kurt. I knew that Denny was behind me on older tires as well, so I was somewhat encouraged by that."

"I'm just really proud of everybody on our...team for not giving up and doing all the things they had to do to get the car back on the track," Harvick said after a disappointing 42nd-place finish. "...we've just got to go win one of these [next two] races."

=== Confrontation ===
“That is emotion coming out when the stakes are really high in the Chase. We’ve got a reigning champion who finds himself in a tough spot ... really needing to win (to advance), so you understand the frustration. You don’t like to see what happened, but from our standpoint that’s just pure emotion when the stakes are high and knowing how important it is to go out and win a championship.”

— Steve O'Donnell, NASCAR executive vice–president and chief racing development officer, speaking on The Morning Drive on Sirius XM NASCAR Radio.

Following the race, Jimmie Johnson went to Kevin Harvick's motorhome in the driver's lot to talk the incident over with the driver of the No. 4 Chevrolet. But when he got to Harvick's motorhome, he was greeted with a punch to the chest. The situation had to be diffused by Harvick's business manager Josh Jones and wife DeLana. They escorted him to a waiting white SUV and drove off from the race track.

Afterwards, Johnson said that he "assume[d] he would try to find it [as] my fault. I just simply needed the lane to get back on the racetrack. By no means was I trying to do anything different. I've seen him on the flat working his way back up looking for a racing lane. That is what I was doing. I was on the bottom trying to get back up on the racing surface, and he was trying to pin me down and I had to get back up or else it would have been a hell of a mess."

Joey Logano, who appeared to make contact with No. 48 Chevrolet, said that he never touched him or forced him down onto the apron going into turn 1. "I don't know. I was a little behind it," said Logano, who finished sixth in the Chase opener. "I just saw the 48 go three-wide bottom, and I was just trying to protect my position and figure out what lane I wanted to go in from there."

In his weekly appearance on the Sirius XM NASCAR Radio program The Morning Drive, NASCAR Executive Vice–President and Chief Racing Development Officer Steve O'Donnell told Mike Bagley and Pete Pistone that “there won’t be any penalties ” issued for the confrontation and explained the sanctioning body's reason behind the decision.

=== Penalties ===
On the Wednesday following the race, NASCAR issued penalties to the No. 10 Stewart–Haas Racing team and No. 15 Michael Waltrip Racing team.

- The No. 10 team was penalized for an infraction that occurred during pre-qualifying inspection on September 18. This is a P2 level penalty (Sections 12.1 and 20.4b and 20.4.2a of the NASCAR rule book). The right side quarter panel behind the rear wheel/tire was modified during pre-qualifying inspection. Crew chief Daniel Knost was placed on NASCAR probation through December 31, 2015. Car chief Pete White was placed on NASCAR probation through December 31.
- The No. 15 team was penalized for an infraction that occurred on opening day inspection September 18. This is a P4 level penalty (Section 12.1, 20. 14.c, 20.14.2.1.k, 12.5.3.4.d, 12.5.3.4.1.d & f, 12.5.3.4.2 of the NASCAR rule book). Crew chief Billy Scott was fined 75–thousand dollars, suspended for the next three NASCAR Sprint Cup Series Championship events and placed on NASCAR probation for six months following the issue of suspension. Driver Clint Bowyer has been penalized 25–points. Car owner Rob Kauffman has been penalized 25 owner points.

Michael Waltrip Racing released a statement saying that it "respectfully disagrees" with the penalties and would immediately appeal. "MWR has made mistakes in the past, but we feel we are correct in this instance," the team said. "We look forward to the opportunity to present our case to the appeals committee and have no further public comment until the process is completed."

NASCAR requested to the Appeals Administrator of the National Motorsports Appeals Panel that the appeals process described in the rule book be expedited.

On Wednesday, September 30, the National Motorsports Appeal Panel upheld the penalty levied against the team. The team decided not to make a final appeal and released a statement that said they were "disappointed with the outcome of today’s ruling and still feel our interpretation is within the guidelines. Rather than continue the appeals process, MWR is ready to focus 100 percent of our company’s resources on winning at Dover and trying to advance to the Contender Round of the Chase for the NASCAR Sprint Cup."

== Race results ==
Pos	No.	Driver	Team	Manufacturer	Laps	Points
1	11	Denny Hamlin	Joe Gibbs Racing	Toyota	267	47
2	19	Carl Edwards	Joe Gibbs Racing	Toyota	267	43
3	41	Kurt Busch	Stewart–Haas Racing	Chevrolet	267	42
4	31	Ryan Newman	Richard Childress Racing	Chevrolet	267	40
5	20	Matt Kenseth	Joe Gibbs Racing	Toyota	267	40
6	22	Joey Logano	Team Penske	Ford	267	39
7	42	Kyle Larson	Chip Ganassi Racing	Chevrolet	267	38
8	2	Brad Keselowski	Team Penske	Ford	267	36
9	18	Kyle Busch	Joe Gibbs Racing	Toyota	267	37
10	43	Aric Almirola	Richard Petty Motorsports	Ford	267	34
11	48	Jimmie Johnson	Hendrick Motorsports	Chevrolet	267	33
12	88	Dale Earnhardt Jr.	Hendrick Motorsports	Chevrolet	267	32
13	78	Martin Truex Jr.	Furniture Row Racing	Chevrolet	267	32
14	24	Jeff Gordon	Hendrick Motorsports	Chevrolet	267	31
15	55	David Ragan	Michael Waltrip Racing	Toyota	267	29
16	1	Jamie McMurray	Chip Ganassi Racing	Chevrolet	266	28
17	27	Paul Menard	Richard Childress Racing	Chevrolet	266	27
18	17	Ricky Stenhouse Jr.	Roush Fenway Racing	Ford	265	26
19	15	Clint Bowyer	Michael Waltrip Racing	Toyota	265	0 (Note: Clint Bowyer was handed a 25–point penalty for a P4 level penalty.)
20	13	Casey Mears	Germain Racing	Chevrolet	265	24
21	16	Greg Biffle	Roush Fenway Racing	Ford	265	23
22	33	Brian Scott (i)	Hillman-Circle Sport LLC	Chevrolet	265	0
23	51	Justin Allgaier	HScott Motorsports	Chevrolet	265	21
24	5	Kasey Kahne	Hendrick Motorsports	Chevrolet	264	20
25	14	Tony Stewart	Stewart–Haas Racing	Chevrolet	264	19
26	10	Danica Patrick	Stewart–Haas Racing	Chevrolet	264	18
27	40	Landon Cassill (i)	Hillman-Circle Sport LLC	Chevrolet	263	0
28	6	Trevor Bayne	Roush Fenway Racing	Ford	263	16
29	35	Cole Whitt	Front Row Motorsports	Ford	263	15
30	9	Sam Hornish Jr.	Richard Petty Motorsports	Ford	262	14
31	34	Brett Moffitt (R)	Front Row Motorsports	Ford	262	13
32	38	David Gilliland	Front Row Motorsports	Ford	262	12
33	32	Josh Wise	Go FAS Racing	Ford	261	11
34	46	Michael Annett	HScott Motorsports	Chevrolet	261	10
35	26	J. J. Yeley (i)	BK Racing	Toyota	261	0
36	47	A. J. Allmendinger	JTG Daugherty Racing	Chevrolet	260	8
37	7	Alex Bowman	Tommy Baldwin Racing	Chevrolet	259	7
38	23	Jeb Burton (R)	BK Racing	Toyota	259	6
39	83	Matt DiBenedetto (R)	BK Racing	Toyota	258	5
40	98	Reed Sorenson	Premium Motorsports	Ford	258	4
41	62	Timmy Hill (i)	Premium Motorsports	Chevrolet	255	0
42	4	Kevin Harvick	Stewart–Haas Racing	Chevrolet	209	3
43	3	Austin Dillon	Richard Childress Racing	Chevrolet	198	1
Unofficial race results

=== Race statistics ===
- 17 lead changes among 10 different drivers
- 6 cautions for 28 laps
- Time of race: 2 hours, 51 minute, 30 seconds
- Average speed: 140.117 mph (225.496 km/h)
- Denny Hamlin took home $306,315 in winnings

Lap Leaders
Laps	Leader
1-5	Kevin Harvick
6	Joey Logano
7-45	Martin Truex Jr.
46-128	Kyle Busch
129-133	Kevin Harvick
134-143	Kyle Busch
144-183	Jeff Gordon
184	Kurt Busch
185	Kyle Busch
186-187	Kyle Larson
188-193	Carl Edwards
194-220	Kyle Busch
221-239	Kurt Busch
240-243	Denny Hamlin
244	Matt Kenseth
245-261	Kurt Busch
262	Jeff Gordon
263-267	Denny Hamlin

Total laps led
Leader	Laps
Kyle Busch	121
Jeff Gordon	41
Martin Truex Jr.	39
Kurt Busch	37
Kevin Harvick	10
Denny Hamlin	9
Carl Edwards	6
Kyle Larson	2
Matt Kenseth	1
Joey Logano	1

==== Race awards ====
- Coors Light Pole Award: No winner
- 3M Lap Leader: Kyle Busch (121 laps)
- American Ethanol Green Flag Restart Award: Kyle Busch
- Duralast Brakes "Bake In The Race" Award: Kevin Harvick
- Freescale "Wide Open": Kurt Busch
- Ingersoll Rand Power Move: Ryan Newman (5 positions)
- MAHLE Clevite Engine Builder of the Race: Toyota Racing Development, #11
- Mobil 1 Driver of the Race: Kyle Busch (130.6 driver rating)
- Moog Steering and Suspension Problem Solver of The Race: Kurt Busch (crew chief Tony Gibson (0.519 seconds))
- NASCAR Sprint Cup Leader Bonus: No winner: rolls over to $240,000 at next event
- Sherwin-Williams Fastest Lap: Kyle Busch (Lap 136, 29.572, 182.605 mph (293.874 km/h))
- Sunoco Rookie of The Race: Brett Moffitt

== Media ==
=== Television ===
NBCSN covered the race on the television side. Rick Allen, Jeff Burton and Steve Letarte had the call in the booth for the race. Dave Burns, Mike Massaro, Marty Snider and Kelli Stavast handled pit road on the television side.

NBCSN
Booth announcers	Pit reporters
Lap-by-lap: Rick Allen; Color-commentator: Jeff Burton; Color-commentator: Steve Letarte	Dave Burns; Mike Massaro; Marty Snider; Kelli Stavast

=== Radio ===
MRN had the radio call for the race, which was simulcast on Sirius XM NASCAR Radio. Joe Moore, Jeff Striegle and Rusty Wallace called the race from the booth when the field was racing down the front stretch. Dave Moody called the race from a billboard outside of turn 2 when the field was racing through turns 1 and 2. Mike Bagley called the race from a billboard outside of turn 3 when the field was racing through turns 3 and 4. Alex Hayden, Winston Kelley and Steve Post worked pit road on the radio side.

MRN
Booth announcers	Turn announcers	Pit reporters
Lead announcer: Joe Moore; Announcer: Jeff Striegle; Announcer: Rusty Wallace	Turns 1 & 2: Dave Moody; Turns 3 & 4: Mike Bagley	Alex Hayden; Winston Kelley; Steve Post

== Standings after the race ==
Drivers' Championship standings

	Pos	Driver	Points
2	1	Matt Kenseth	2,052
9	2	Denny Hamlin	2,050 (–2)
5	3	Carl Edwards	2,049 (–3)
2	4	Kyle Busch	2,049 (–3)
2	5	Kurt Busch	2,048 (–4)
2	6	Joey Logano	2,048 (–4)
6	7	Jimmie Johnson	2,045 (–7)
6	8	Ryan Newman	2,040 (–12)
	9	Brad Keselowski	2,039 (–13)
4	10	Dale Earnhardt Jr.	2,038 (–14)
1	11	Martin Truex Jr.	2,035 (–17)
1	12	Jeff Gordon	2,031 (–21)
1	13	Jamie McMurray	2,028 (–24)
1	14	Paul Menard	2,027 (–25)
10	15	Kevin Harvick	2,009 (–43)
	16	Clint Bowyer	2,000 (–52)

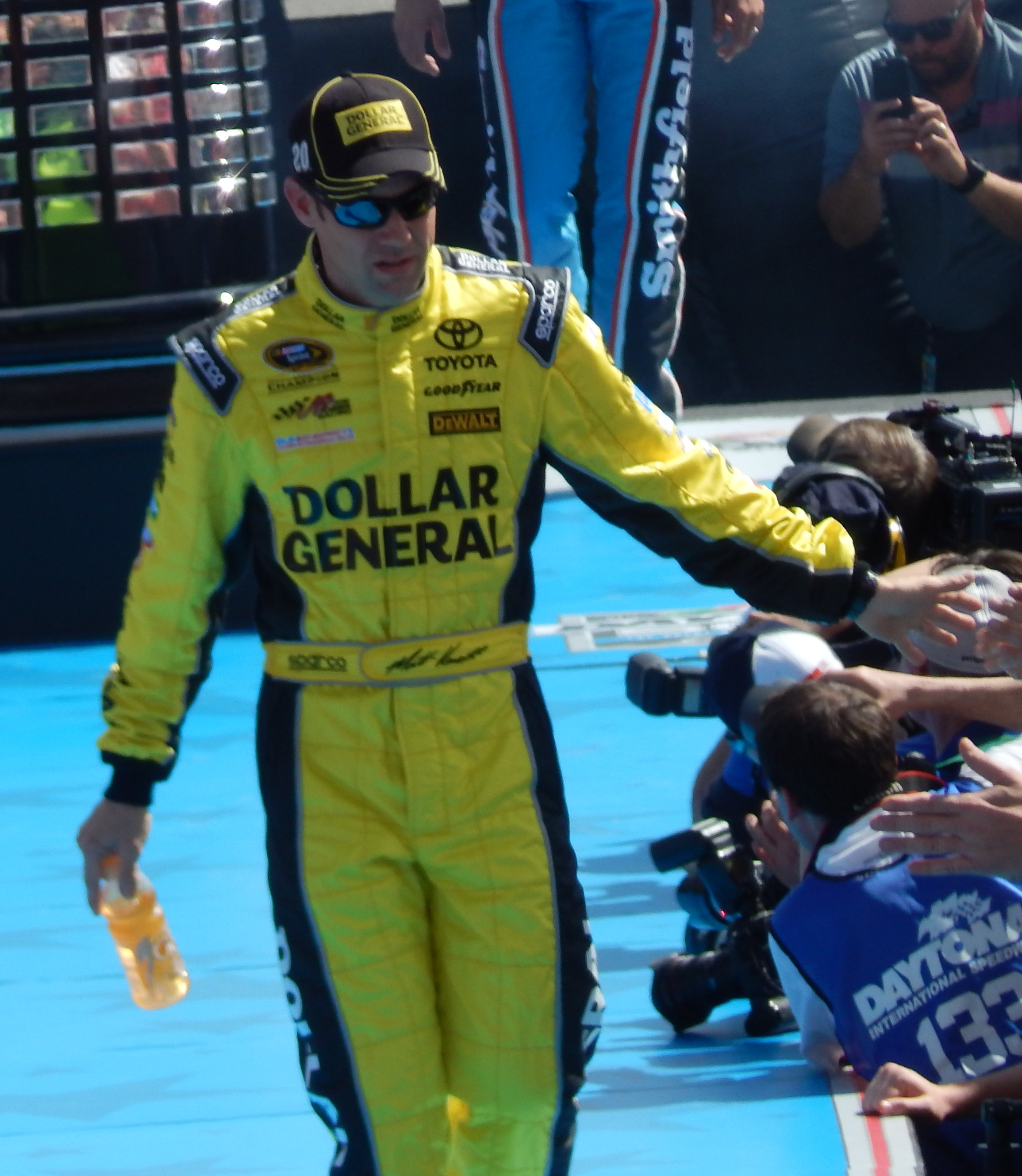
Matt Kenseth left Chicagoland with a two–point lead over Denny Hamlin.

Manufacturers' Championship standings

Pos	Manufacturer	Points
1	Chevrolet	1,187
2	Toyota	1,138 (–49)
3	Ford	1,120 (–67)

- Note: Only the first sixteen positions are included for the driver standings.

== Note ==
Previous race: 2015 Federated Auto Parts 400	Sprint Cup Series; 2015 season	Next race: 2015 Sylvania 300
