= 2015 Federated Auto Parts 400 =

Race details
- Race 26 of 36 in the 2015 NASCAR Sprint Cup Series
- Date: September 12, 2015
- Location: Richmond Raceway in Richmond, Virginia
- Course: Permanent racing facility
- Course length: .75 miles (1.2 km)
- Distance: 400 laps, 300 mi (480 km)
- Weather: Mostly cloudy skies with a temperature of 69 °F (21 °C); wind out of the west/southwest at 3 mph (4.8 km/h)
- Average speed: 100.353 mph (161.502 km/h)

Pole position
Driver	Joey Logano	Team Penske
- Time: 21.349

Most laps led
Driver	Matt Kenseth	Joe Gibbs Racing
- Laps: 352

Winner
No. 20	Matt Kenseth	Joe Gibbs Racing

Television in the United States
- Network: NBCSN
- Announcers: Rick Allen, Jeff Burton and Steve Letarte
- Nielsen ratings: 1.7/3 (Overnight); 1.8/3 (Final); 3.1 Million viewers

Radio in the United States
- Radio: MRN
- Booth announcers: Joe Moore, Jeff Striegle and Rusty Wallace
- Turn announcers: Dave Moody (Backstretch)

The 2015 Federated Auto Parts 400 was a NASCAR Sprint Cup Series race held on September 12, 2015, at Richmond Raceway in Richmond, Virginia. Contested over 400 laps on the three–quarter (1.2 km) short track, it was the 26th race of the 2015 NASCAR Sprint Cup Series season. Matt Kenseth won the race, his fourth of the season. Kyle Busch finished second. Joey Logano, Aric Almirola and Dale Earnhardt Jr. rounded out the top-five.

Logano won the pole for the race and led 25 laps on his way to a third–place finish. Kenseth led a race high of 352 laps on his way to winning the race. The race had 13 lead changes among four different drivers, as well as six caution flag periods for 47 laps.

This was the 35th career victory for Matt Kenseth, fourth of the season, second at Richmond International Raceway and 10th at the track for Joe Gibbs Racing. With the win, Kenseth moved into a tie with Kyle Busch and Jimmie Johnson for the points lead after the Chase reset. Despite being the winning manufacturer, Toyota left Richmond trailing Chevrolet by 54–points in the manufacturer standings.

The Federated Auto Parts 400 was carried by NBC Sports on the cable/satellite NBCSN network for the American television audience. The radio broadcast for the race was carried by the Motor Racing Network and Sirius XM NASCAR Radio.

== Report ==
=== Background ===
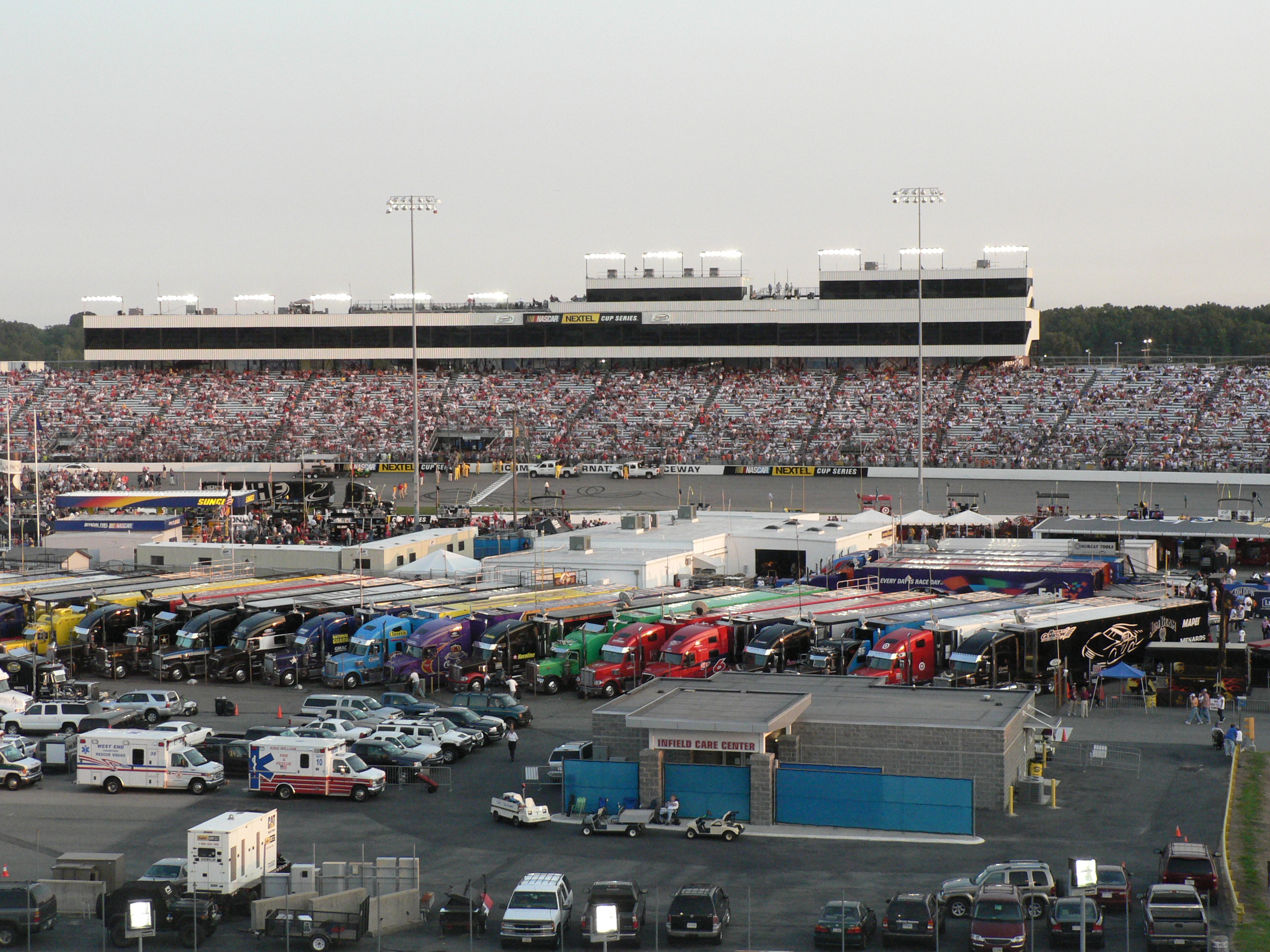
Richmond International Raceway, the track where the race was held.

Richmond International Raceway (RIR) is a 3/4-mile (1.2 km), D-shaped, asphalt race track located just outside Richmond, Virginia in Henrico County. Kevin Harvick entered Richmond with a 42–point lead over Joey Logano. Dale Earnhardt Jr. entered 93 back. Brad Keselowski entered 111 back. Jimmie Johnson entered 131 back.

==== Chase-clinching scenarios ====
The following scenarios were in play for the 2015 Chase for the Sprint Cup.

===== Regardless of who wins =====
Jamie McMurray clinched by starting the race. Ryan Newman would clinch by finishing 31st or better, 32nd if he led at least one lap or 33rd if he led the most laps. Jeff Gordon would clinch by finishing 17th or better, 18th if he led at least one lap or 19th if he led the most laps. Paul Menard would clinch by finishing ninth or better, 10th if he led at least one lap or 11th if he led the most laps.

===== If there's a repeat winner =====
Jamie McMurray, Ryan Newman and Jeff Gordon would clinch regardless of finish. Paul Menard would clinch if he finished 38th or better, 39th if he led at least one lap or 40th if he led the most laps. Clint Bowyer would clinch if he finished 28th or better, 29th if he led at least one lap or 30th if he led the most laps.

===== Must win to clinch a spot =====
Greg Biffle, Kyle Larson, Austin Dillon, A. J. Allmendinger, Casey Mears, Danica Patrick, Tony Stewart, David Ragan, Sam Hornish Jr., Trevor Bayne, Ricky Stenhouse Jr. and Justin Allgaier had to win this race to clinch a spot in the Chase.

==== Entry list ====
The entry list for the Federated Auto Parts 400 was released on Monday, September 7 at 1:05 p.m. Eastern time. Forty-five cars were entered for the race. All but Michael McDowell in the No. 95 Leavine Family Racing Ford were entered for the previous week's race at Darlington. Josh Wise drove the No. 30 Chevrolet for The Motorsports Group. Jeffrey Earnhardt attempted to make his first Sprint Cup Series start in the No. 32 Go FAS Racing Ford. Brian Scott drove the No. 33 Hillman-Circle Sport LLC Chevrolet.

No.	Driver	Team	Manufacturer
1	Jamie McMurray	Chip Ganassi Racing	Chevrolet
2	Brad Keselowski (PC3)	Team Penske	Ford
3	Austin Dillon	Richard Childress Racing	Chevrolet
4	Kevin Harvick (PC1)	Stewart–Haas Racing	Chevrolet
5	Kasey Kahne	Hendrick Motorsports	Chevrolet
6	Trevor Bayne	Roush Fenway Racing	Ford
7	Alex Bowman	Tommy Baldwin Racing	Chevrolet
9	Sam Hornish Jr.	Richard Petty Motorsports	Ford
10	Danica Patrick	Stewart–Haas Racing	Chevrolet
11	Denny Hamlin	Joe Gibbs Racing	Toyota
13	Casey Mears	Germain Racing	Chevrolet
14	Tony Stewart (PC4)	Stewart–Haas Racing	Chevrolet
15	Clint Bowyer	Michael Waltrip Racing	Toyota
16	Greg Biffle	Roush Fenway Racing	Ford
17	Ricky Stenhouse Jr.	Roush Fenway Racing	Ford
18	Kyle Busch	Joe Gibbs Racing	Toyota
19	Carl Edwards	Joe Gibbs Racing	Toyota
20	Matt Kenseth (PC6)	Joe Gibbs Racing	Toyota
22	Joey Logano	Team Penske	Ford
23	Jeb Burton (R)	BK Racing	Toyota
24	Jeff Gordon (PC7)	Hendrick Motorsports	Chevrolet
26	J. J. Yeley (i)	BK Racing	Toyota
27	Paul Menard	Richard Childress Racing	Chevrolet
30	Josh Wise	The Motorsports Group	Chevrolet
31	Ryan Newman	Richard Childress Racing	Chevrolet
32	Jeffrey Earnhardt (i)	Go FAS Racing	Ford
33	Brian Scott (i)	Hillman-Circle Sport LLC	Chevrolet
34	Brett Moffitt (R)	Front Row Motorsports	Ford
35	Cole Whitt	Front Row Motorsports	Ford
38	David Gilliland	Front Row Motorsports	Ford
40	Landon Cassill (i)	Hillman-Circle Sport LLC	Chevrolet
41	Kurt Busch (PC5)	Stewart–Haas Racing	Chevrolet
42	Kyle Larson	Chip Ganassi Racing	Chevrolet
43	Aric Almirola	Richard Petty Motorsports	Ford
46	Michael Annett	HScott Motorsports	Chevrolet
47	A. J. Allmendinger	JTG Daugherty Racing	Chevrolet
48	Jimmie Johnson (PC2)	Hendrick Motorsports	Chevrolet
51	Justin Allgaier	HScott Motorsports	Chevrolet
55	David Ragan	Michael Waltrip Racing	Toyota
62	Timmy Hill (i)	Premium Motorsports	Chevrolet
78	Martin Truex Jr.	Furniture Row Racing	Chevrolet
83	Matt DiBenedetto (R)	BK Racing	Toyota
88	Dale Earnhardt Jr.	Hendrick Motorsports	Chevrolet
95	Michael McDowell	Leavine Family Racing	Ford
98	Reed Sorenson (i)	Premium Motorsports	Ford
Official entry list

Key	Meaning
(R)	Rookie
(i)	Ineligible for points
(PC#)	Past champions provisional

== Practice ==
=== First practice ===
Kyle Larson was the fastest in the first practice session with a time of 21.508 and a speed of 125.535 mph (202.029 km/h).

Pos	No.	Driver	Team	Manufacturer	Time	Speed
1	42	Kyle Larson	Chip Ganassi Racing	Chevrolet	21.508	125.535
2	13	Casey Mears	Germain Racing	Chevrolet	21.529	125.412
3	2	Brad Keselowski	Team Penske	Ford	21.590	125.058
Official first practice results

=== Final practice ===
Kevin Harvick was the fastest in the final practice session with a time of 21.526 and a speed of 125.430 mph (201.860 km/h).

Pos	No.	Driver	Team	Manufacturer	Time	Speed
1	4	Kevin Harvick	Stewart–Haas Racing	Chevrolet	21.526	125.430
2	18	Kyle Busch	Joe Gibbs Racing	Toyota	21.540	125.348
3	48	Jimmie Johnson	Hendrick Motorsports	Chevrolet	21.553	125.273
Official final practice results

== Qualifying ==
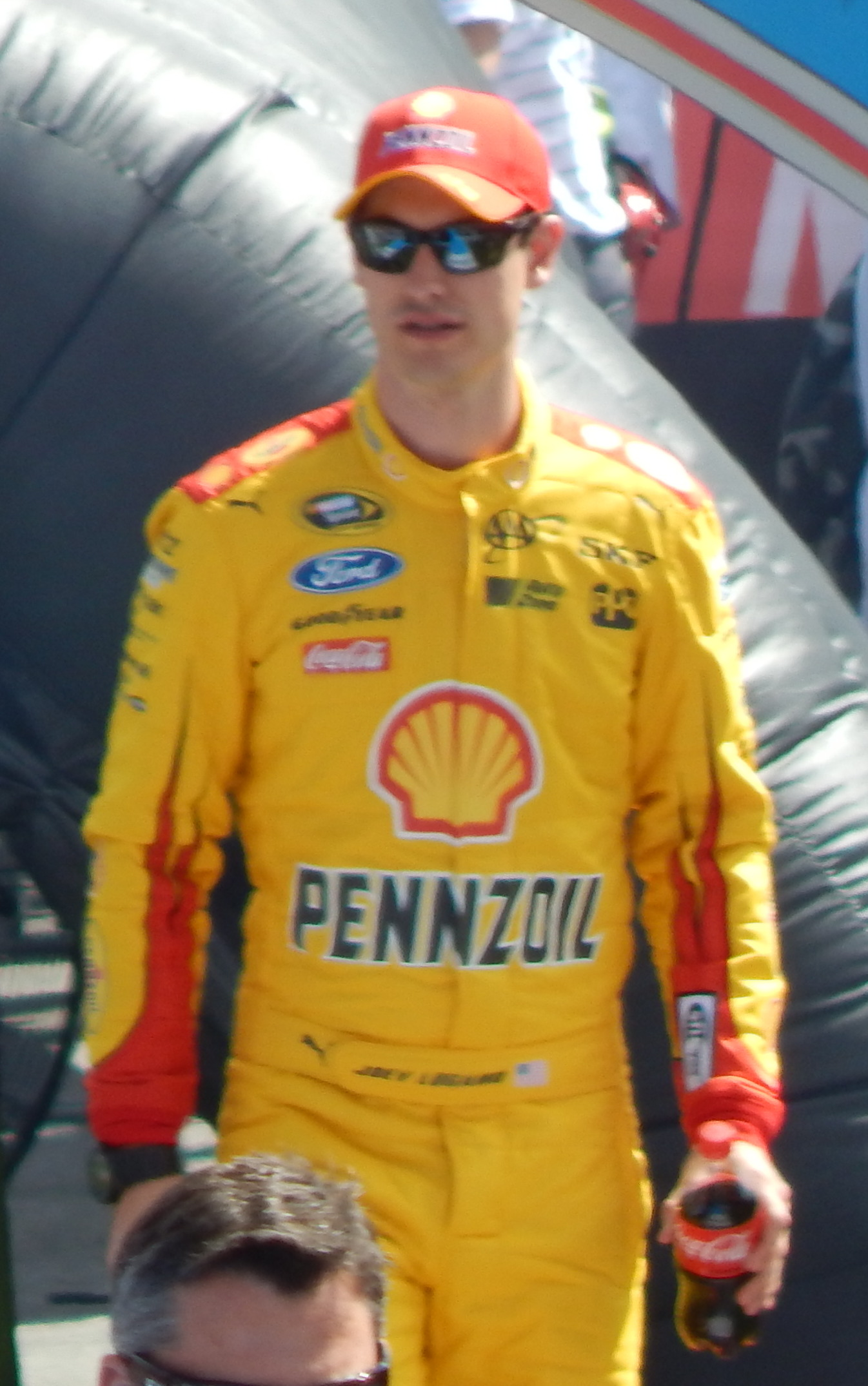
Joey Logano won the pole for the race.

Joey Logano won the pole with a time of 21.349 and a speed of 126.470 mph (203.534 km/h). "Just a great effort from this team," Logano said. "I can’t say enough of (crew chief) Todd Gordon and everyone with the Shell/Pennzoil team that gives me a these greats cars every week. It’d be great to end the regular season with the win here Saturday night and take that momentum into the Chase next week at Chicago." "We’re the best on stickers," Matt Kenseth said of his tires after qualifying second. "I just didn’t get the lap I wanted there at the end." "We weren’t that great in qualifying trim so I didn’t know what to expect, but obviously we have a good car and we made some good adjustments on that qualifying run," said David Ragan after qualifying fifth. "That’s a great qualifying spot and anytime you can start in the top-10 or top-five, that’s a great spot." "This is a tough place," Jeff Gordon said after qualifying 23rd for his 46th and final career start at Richmond. "But we're better than that. I hate it for our 3M Chevrolet team that we're going to be starting there, because I know we're better than that." "Just real slow and out of the track," said Dale Earnhardt Jr. after qualifying 29th. "I don't know, man, we've struggled all year in qualifying and it doesn't look like it's getting any better." Jeffrey Earnhardt, grandson of Dale Earnhardt, qualified 42nd for his first career Sprint Cup Series start. "It's exciting, it's what we've been trying to do ever since I started racing - it was to be here and now I am," Earnhardt told Motorsport.com.

=== Qualifying results ===
Pos	No.	Driver	Team	Manufacturer	R1	R2	R3
1	22	Joey Logano	Team Penske	Ford	21.158	21.170	21.349
2	20	Matt Kenseth	Joe Gibbs Racing	Toyota	20.883	21.141	21.368
3	2	Brad Keselowski	Team Penske	Ford	21.084	21.366	21.369
4	18	Kyle Busch	Joe Gibbs Racing	Toyota	21.077	21.285	21.437
5	55	David Ragan	Michael Waltrip Racing	Toyota	21.173	21.318	21.458
6	4	Kevin Harvick	Stewart–Haas Racing	Chevrolet	21.098	21.293	21.463
7	19	Carl Edwards	Joe Gibbs Racing	Toyota	21.193	21.339	21.474
8	41	Kurt Busch	Stewart–Haas Racing	Chevrolet	21.061	21.340	21.516
9	48	Jimmie Johnson	Hendrick Motorsports	Chevrolet	21.056	21.264	21.530
10	14	Tony Stewart	Stewart–Haas Racing	Chevrolet	21.196	21.361	21.552
11	42	Kyle Larson	Chip Ganassi Racing	Chevrolet	21.198	21.343	21.560
12	3	Austin Dillon	Richard Childress Racing	Chevrolet	21.186	21.284	21.570
13	31	Ryan Newman	Richard Childress Racing	Chevrolet	21.053	21.372	—
14	10	Danica Patrick	Stewart–Haas Racing	Chevrolet	21.084	21.376	—
15	13	Casey Mears	Germain Racing	Chevrolet	21.184	21.395	—
16	78	Martin Truex Jr.	Furniture Row Racing	Chevrolet	21.224	21.406	—
17	33	Brian Scott (i)	Hillman-Circle Sport LLC	Chevrolet	21.229	21.424	—
18	51	Justin Allgaier	HScott Motorsports	Chevrolet	21.157	21.439	—
19	17	Ricky Stenhouse Jr.	Roush Fenway Racing	Ford	21.104	21.449	—
20	5	Kasey Kahne	Hendrick Motorsports	Chevrolet	21.195	21.456	—
21	47	A. J. Allmendinger	JTG Daugherty Racing	Chevrolet	21.117	21.465	—
22	27	Paul Menard	Richard Childress Racing	Chevrolet	21.239	21.478	—
23	24	Jeff Gordon	Hendrick Motorsports	Chevrolet	21.159	21.497	—
24	43	Aric Almirola	Richard Petty Motorsports	Ford	21.217	21.509	—
25	11	Denny Hamlin	Joe Gibbs Racing	Toyota	21.243	—	—
26	15	Clint Bowyer	Michael Waltrip Racing	Toyota	21.244	—	—
27	46	Michael Annett	HScott Motorsports	Chevrolet	21.244	—	—
28	6	Trevor Bayne	Roush Fenway Racing	Ford	21.250	—	—
29	88	Dale Earnhardt Jr.	Hendrick Motorsports	Chevrolet	21.290	—	—
30	38	David Gilliland	Front Row Motorsports	Ford	21.296	—	—
31	1	Jamie McMurray	Chip Ganassi Racing	Chevrolet	21.345	—	—
32	9	Sam Hornish Jr.	Richard Petty Motorsports	Ford	21.381	—	—
33	83	Matt DiBenedetto (R)	BK Racing	Toyota	21.381	—	—
34	35	Cole Whitt	Front Row Motorsports	Ford	21.430	—	—
35	40	Landon Cassill (i)	Hillman-Circle Sport LLC	Chevrolet	21.443	—	—
36	7	Alex Bowman	Tommy Baldwin Racing	Chevrolet	21.445	—	—
37	34	Brett Moffitt (R)	Front Row Motorsports	Ford	21.503	—	—
38	16	Greg Biffle	Roush Fenway Racing	Ford	21.558	—	—
39	95	Michael McDowell	Leavine Family Racing	Ford	21.619	—	—
40	98	Reed Sorenson	Premium Motorsports	Ford	21.657	—	—
41	23	Jeb Burton (R)	BK Racing	Toyota	21.757	—	—
42	32	Jeffrey Earnhardt (i)	Go FAS Racing	Ford	21.767	—	—
43	26	J. J. Yeley (i)	BK Racing	Toyota	21.857	—	—
Failed to qualify
44	30	Josh Wise	The Motorsports Group	Chevrolet	21.489	—	—
45	62	Timmy Hill (i)	Premium Motorsports	Chevrolet	22.891	—	—
Official qualifying results

== Race ==
=== First half ===
==== Start ====
Under mostly cloudy evening Virginia skies, Joey Logano led the field to the green flag at 7:57 p.m. He shot ahead of Matt Kenseth to lead the first lap. By lap 14, Kenseth pulled to the rear of Logano and eventually passed him going into turn 1 to take the lead on lap 16. By lap 28, he caught up to the tail-end of the field and used lap traffic to increase his lead. The first caution of the race flew on lap 37 when Martin Truex Jr. slammed the wall in turn 1. To add insult to injury, he was tagged for speeding on pit road and was forced to restart from the tail-end of the field.

The race restarted on lap 47. After restarting in the outside lane, Logano led a lap before Kenseth retook the lead from him. After 30 laps, he pulled to a four-second lead over Brad Keselowski. Debris in turn 1 brought out the second caution on lap 97. Danica Patrick was tagged for speeding on pit road and Cole Whitt was tagged for an uncontrolled tire. Both were forced to restart the race from the rear.

==== Second quarter ====
The race restarted on lap 104. Logano used the momentum of riding the outside line to take the lead the next lap. Kenseth passed him on the outside to retake the lead on lap 110. The third caution flew when Michael Annett got hooked by Jeb Burton, bounced off Michael McDowell, slid down the track and slammed the inside wall on the backstretch. Logano opted not to pit under the caution and assumed the lead.

The race restarted on lap 126. A lap later, Denny Hamlin easily passed Logano for the lead. After five laps, the entire Joe Gibbs Racing team ran first, second, third, fourth and pulled away from the field. Kenseth ran down and passed Hamlin for the lead on lap 139. Debris brought out the fourth caution on lap 210.

=== Second half ===
==== Third quarter ====
The race restarted on lap 218. Kyle Busch dove underneath Kenseth to take the lead on the next lap. Kenseth passed him to retake the lead on lap 228. Debris on the backstretch brought out the fifth caution on lap 290. Under the caution, McDowell collided with one of the service trucks and tore off his entire rear bumper. "It was my mistake, obviously," McDowell said. "I’m driving it, so I take full responsibility for it. But it definitely caught me off guard and it was a surprise. I didn’t know it was even sitting there. Obviously I’m thankful nobody got hurt, embarrassed for my team and it was my mistake driving. A lot happened at once. Everybody jumped on the brakes and I just didn’t have time to react." Keselowski and Jamie McMurray were both tagged for speeding on pit road and restarted from the tail-end of the field.

==== Fourth quarter ====
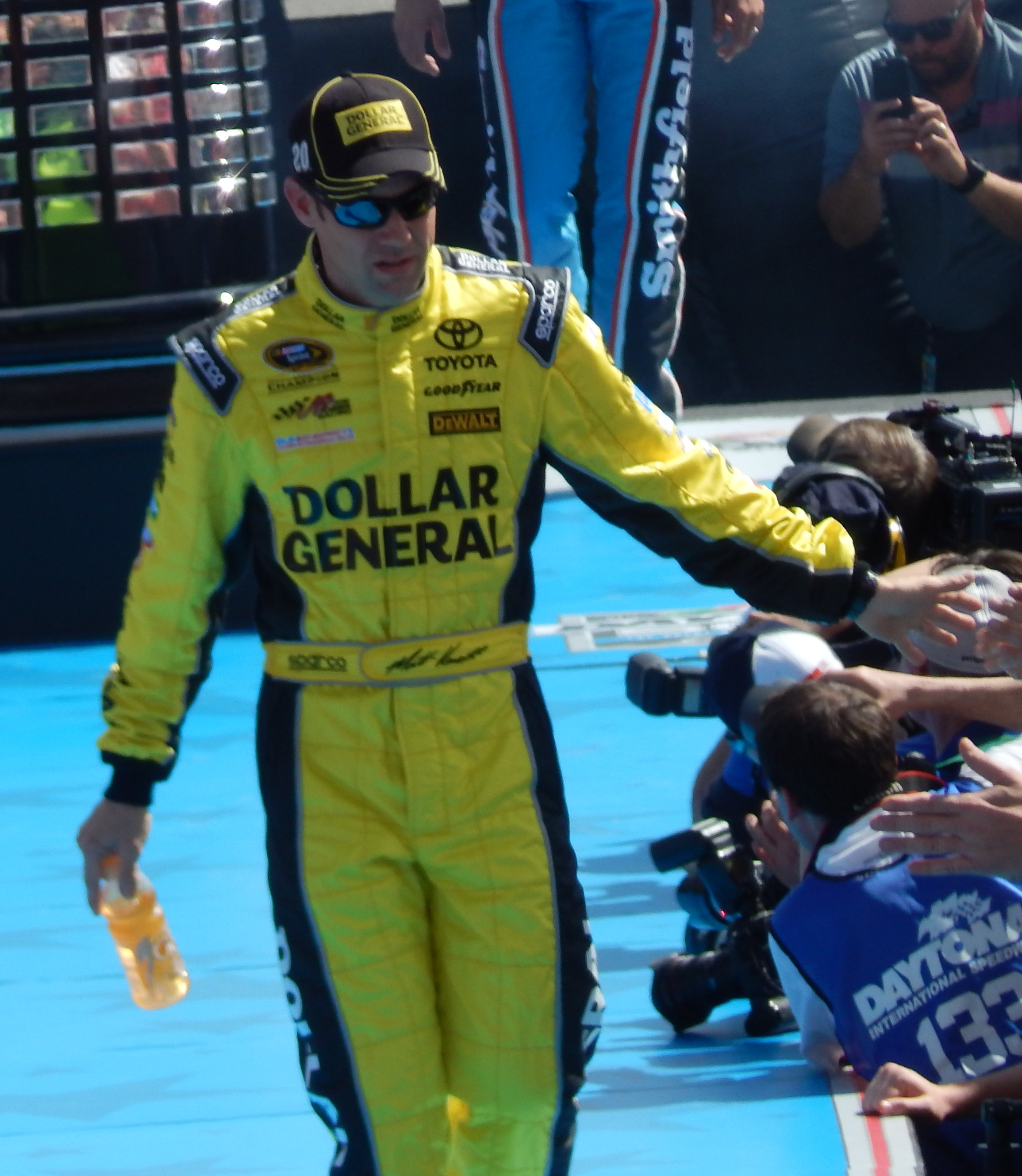
Matt Kenseth, seen here at the 2015 Daytona 500, scored his 35th career win at Richmond.

The race restarted on lap 297. Logano shot ahead of Kenseth to take the lead. Kenseth drove by him the next lap to retake the lead. Debris on the backstretch brought out the sixth caution of the race with 26 laps to go.

The race restarted with 18 laps to go. Kenseth drove off to score the victory.

== Post-race ==
=== Driver comments ===
"We were really superb in the long run, but we had to work for it pretty hard in the short run," Kenseth said. "I was disappointed to see the last caution. I knew it was going to be tough, but we were able to get the jump and get out front."

"It is tough," a dejected Aric Almirola said after what actually turned out to be his best finish of the season in fourth. "This is what we race for. We race to win races. We race to run for a championship. This race team, we got to do it last year and we had an engine failure at Chicago and feel like we had a lot more to show in the Chase last year. We wanted another shot at it really bad. We have a really, really good race team and am disappointed we didn’t get Smithfield and Ford into the Chase again."

"I wasn’t limited in the car at all," Denny Hamlin said after finishing sixth with a torn right ACL. "You really don’t notice anything until you stop, and that’s the thing, feeling the throbbing, feeling my heart beat in my knee. I thought it (his knee) was good at first. I had it drained right before the race started, which helped a lot, getting a bunch of that blood out of there. After that, I felt pretty good. Obviously, any kind of heat brings swelling back. I’m sure it swelled again at the end of the race, and that’s why I’m as stiff as I am."

"The car.....I was a little nervous, we were hovering around 21st, we made a slight adjustment and boom we started going to the front," Jeff Gordon explained after finishing seventh. "I don't know if we were a top‑five car, but we were definitely a top‑10 car and finished seventh. Excited we finally had a solid night on pit road, on the racetrack, in the race car, communication. Everything was just really solid. That certainly gives us something to be excited about these next ten races and these guys have been working so hard. I know everybody works hard but they just haven't been getting the rewards of that hard work. It's nice to be in the Chase and take that relief and take that breath and now go reset and see what we can do over the next 10. We're behind. We know that. Those guys are unbelievable. But there's a lot of ways to make it to Homestead and there's a lot that can happen and we're working as hard as anybody to try to see what we can do better, learn from our competitors, and try to catch up, but we're definitely playing catch‑up. I think Junior is probably the best in our stable right now and he proved that again tonight (fifth), but we work hard together to try to improve for each of us, and if we continue to do that, we'll make gains. There was a lot of pressure in this final season to make that Chase, so I'm glad we got that done."

"Obviously everybody knows all the news and the stories, but to be able to battle through that, I owe everybody in the organization a great deal of thanks for keeping their head down, to keep digging and get ourselves into the Chase," Clint Bowyer said after his 10th-place finish qualified him for the Chase. It's a big monumental thing for an organization to go through what we're going through. To get to the Chase is the best of the best, the elite in motorsports, and MWR is once again a part of it. I'm really proud of [crew chief] Billy Scott and everybody on the 5-Hour Energy Toyota."

"We ran about where we typically do here at Richmond, which is right around the top 10," Kyle Larson said after finishing 12th and missing the Chase. "I don't think anybody was beating Matt Kenseth tonight. He was super fast. Disappointing run for the Chase. I think everybody on our team thought the 42 would definitely be in the Chase to start the season after the way we ended last year. But it wasn't the case this season, so we'll work hard the last 10 races to try and run strong for Target and get them a win and work on being consistent. That's where we've struggled pretty much all year long was being consistent, so we'll try and work hard at that and try and finish strong."

"The main thing for me is just figuring out how to get a car to turn again. I struggled all year to have front turn. If I don’t have that I can’t race," Kasey Kahne said after finishing 18th two laps down and missing the Chase. "That is how I’ve been my whole life – just work on trying to get the cars to turn the way I need them to. If we can’t, then we will keep running about 15th. I could take off alright on restarts. We could go for a little bit and then I would just get so tight with the front it wouldn’t turn. I was having a couple of other issues with brakes and stuff." We tried to fight through there. We got a lap down and then once we didn't get the (free pass) we ran in position for a while and we were too far back and ended up two laps down. Matt was really good. Those guys were fast."

"It was a horrible race," Paul Menard said after finishing three laps down in 26th, "but we’re in the Chase. I guess I’m happy. We had such a bad race, but we can hit the reset button now and go to Chicago. Everybody’s got a shot. All it takes is one (bad) race for somebody, and it’s hard to make that up."

=== Possible jumped restart ===
“I think for now we’re still content. It is ... a ball-and-strike call. We’ve got the ability to go back and look at video, which we do, and in this case made the call and moved on from it. It’s still one that we want to leave in the drivers’ hands. If we have to get involved and make those calls with more video, I think we’ll do that, but we’d still like to see it play out the way it does through the final 10. It’s one of those areas that any advantage that a team can try to get on a restart, they’re going to try to do that and put a call in our hands, but that’s our job to make the call during the race.”

— Steve O'Donnell, NASCAR executive vice–president and chief racing development officer, speaking on The Morning Drive on Sirius XM NASCAR Radio.

On the final restart with 18 laps to go, it appeared that race leader Matt Kenseth started accelerating before the restart zone (jumped the restart). Roger Penske, team owner of Team Penske, said sarcastically that someone in race control "must have closed the window and pulled the blind down. That's how bad it was. They talk about it in the drivers meeting and how they were going to do something. They docked [Ryan] Blaney the other night [three weeks prior in the Truck Series race at Bristol] for the same thing. I don't understand. It must be a different set of rules. They've got to come up with some way to say what's right or what's wrong. To me, this is a perfect example of inconsistencies. And when you are racing for as tight as we are for everything that's on the line, you just can't have that kind of officiating."

In his weekly Monday appearance on the Sirius XM NASCAR Radio program The Morning Drive, NASCAR Executive Vice–President and Chief Racing Development Officer Steve O'Donnell explained to Mike Bagley and Pete Pistone why NASCAR decided not to penalize Kenseth for jumping the restart and if NASCAR is content with continuing to leave control of the restart in the hands of the race leader.

=== Collision with service truck ===
"First, we start with conversations with the driver, spotter and the crew chief immediately following the race. What happened, where was the breakdown in communication and see what we can learn from there. Obviously, we got all the video to go through and then for every race that we have, Monday and Tuesday we go through each of the calls for a race. Evaluate what happened, what were the circumstances. We've got training that goes into this prior to the race where we meet with all the track safety and cleanup workers. We do that every morning as well when they're at the track. We'll debrief with those folks as well and see what they saw and look to not have that happen in the future."

— Steve O'Donnell, NASCAR executive vice–president and chief racing development officer, speaking on The Morning Drive on Sirius XM NASCAR Radio.

During his appearance on The Morning Drive, O'Donnell also addressed Michael McDowell colliding with a service truck on the backstretch during the fifth caution of the race. He said that NASCAR had "conversations with the driver, spotter and the crew chief immediately following the race" and that they would "debrief with those folks [track safety and cleanup workers]...[,] see what they saw and look to not have that happen in the future."

== Race results ==
Pos	No.	Driver	Team	Manufacturer	Laps	Points
1	20	Matt Kenseth	Joe Gibbs Racing	Toyota	400	48
2	18	Kyle Busch	Joe Gibbs Racing	Toyota	400	43
3	22	Joey Logano	Team Penske	Ford	400	42
4	43	Aric Almirola	Richard Petty Motorsports	Ford	400	40
5	88	Dale Earnhardt Jr.	Hendrick Motorsports	Chevrolet	400	39
6	11	Denny Hamlin	Joe Gibbs Racing	Toyota	400	39
7	24	Jeff Gordon	Hendrick Motorsports	Chevrolet	400	37
8	2	Brad Keselowski	Team Penske	Ford	400	36
9	48	Jimmie Johnson	Hendrick Motorsports	Chevrolet	400	35
10	15	Clint Bowyer	Michael Waltrip Racing	Toyota	400	34
11	19	Carl Edwards	Joe Gibbs Racing	Toyota	400	33
12	42	Kyle Larson	Chip Ganassi Racing	Chevrolet	400	32
13	1	Jamie McMurray	Chip Ganassi Racing	Chevrolet	399	31
14	4	Kevin Harvick	Stewart–Haas Racing	Chevrolet	399	30
15	41	Kurt Busch	Stewart–Haas Racing	Chevrolet	399	29
16	17	Ricky Stenhouse Jr.	Roush Fenway Racing	Ford	399	28
17	55	David Ragan	Michael Waltrip Racing	Toyota	398	27
18	5	Kasey Kahne	Hendrick Motorsports	Chevrolet	398	26
19	10	Danica Patrick	Stewart–Haas Racing	Chevrolet	397	25
20	31	Ryan Newman	Richard Childress Racing	Chevrolet	397	24
21	13	Casey Mears	Germain Racing	Chevrolet	397	23
22	33	Brian Scott (i)	Hillman-Circle Sport LLC	Chevrolet	397	0
23	6	Trevor Bayne	Roush Fenway Racing	Ford	397	21
24	47	A. J. Allmendinger	JTG Daugherty Racing	Chevrolet	397	20
25	51	Justin Allgaier	HScott Motorsports	Chevrolet	397	19
26	27	Paul Menard	Richard Childress Racing	Chevrolet	397	18
27	3	Austin Dillon	Richard Childress Racing	Chevrolet	397	17
28	9	Sam Hornish Jr.	Richard Petty Motorsports	Ford	397	16
29	14	Tony Stewart	Stewart–Haas Racing	Chevrolet	396	15
30	40	Landon Cassill (i)	Hillman-Circle Sport LLC	Chevrolet	396	0
31	16	Greg Biffle	Roush Fenway Racing	Ford	396	13
32	78	Martin Truex Jr.	Furniture Row Racing	Chevrolet	394	12
33	38	David Gilliland	Front Row Motorsports	Ford	393	11
34	26	J. J. Yeley (i)	BK Racing	Toyota	392	0
35	34	Brett Moffitt (R)	Front Row Motorsports	Ford	391	9
36	83	Matt DiBenedetto (R)	BK Racing	Toyota	390	8
37	7	Alex Bowman	Tommy Baldwin Racing	Chevrolet	390	7
38	35	Cole Whitt	Front Row Motorsports	Ford	389	6
39	23	Jeb Burton (R)	BK Racing	Toyota	387	5
40	32	Jeffrey Earnhardt (i)	Go FAS Racing	Ford	387	0
41	98	Reed Sorenson	Premium Motorsports	Ford	335	3
42	95	Michael McDowell	Leavine Family Racing	Ford	287	2
43	46	Michael Annett	HScott Motorsports	Chevrolet	145	1
Official Federated Auto Parts 400 results

=== Race statistics ===
- 13 lead changes among 4 different drivers
- 6 cautions for 47 laps
- Time of race: 2 hours, 59 minute, 22 seconds
- Average speed: 100.353 mph (161.502 km/h)
- Matt Kenseth took home $262,451 in winnings

Lap Leaders
Laps	Leader
1-14	Joey Logano
15-46	Matt Kenseth
47	Joey Logano
48-103	Matt Kenseth
104-108	Joey Logano
109-121	Matt Kenseth
122-125	Joey Logano
126-138	Denny Hamlin
139-216	Matt Kenseth
217	Denny Hamlin
218-226	Kyle Busch
227-296	Matt Kenseth
297	Joey Logano
298-400	Matt Kenseth

Total laps led
Leader	Laps
Matt Kenseth	352
Joey Logano	25
Denny Hamlin	14
Kyle Busch	9

==== Race awards ====
- Coors Light Pole Award: Joey Logano (21.349, 126.470 mph (203.534 km/h))
- 3M Lap Leader: Matt Kenseth (352 laps)
- American Ethanol Green Flag Restart Award: Matt Kenseth
- Duralast Brakes "Bake In The Race" Award: Matt Kenseth
- Freescale "Wide Open": Joey Logano
- Ingersoll Rand Power Move: Brian Scott (5 positions)
- MAHLE Clevite Engine Builder of the Race: Toyota Racing Development, #20
- Mobil 1 Driver of the Race: Matt Kenseth (149.7 driver rating)
- Moog Steering and Suspension Problem Solver of The Race: Dale Earnhardt Jr. (crew chief Greg Ives (0.154 seconds))
- NASCAR Sprint Cup Leader Bonus: No winner: rolls over to $230,000 at next event
- Sherwin-Williams Fastest Lap: Matt Kenseth (Lap 3, 21.272, 126.927 mph (204.269 km/h))
- Sunoco Rookie of The Race: Brett Moffitt

== Media ==
=== Television ===
NBCSN covered the race on the television side. Rick Allen, 1998 race winner Jeff Burton and Steve Letarte had the call in the booth for the race. Dave Burns, Mike Massaro, Marty Snider and Kelli Stavast handled pit road on the television side.

NBCSN
Booth announcers	Pit reporters
Lap-by-lap: Rick Allen; Color-commentator: Jeff Burton; Color-commentator: Steve Letarte	Dave Burns; Mike Massaro; Marty Snider; Kelli Stavast

=== Radio ===
MRN had the radio call for the race, which was simulcast on Sirius XM NASCAR Radio. Joe Moore, Jeff Striegle and six–time Richmond winner Rusty Wallace called the race from the booth when the field was racing down the front stretch. Dave Moody called the race from a scaffold inside the entrance to turn 3 when the field was racing down the backstretch. Alex Hayden, Winston Kelley and Steve Post worked pit road on the radio side.

MRN
Booth announcers	Turn announcers	Pit reporters
Lead announcer: Joe Moore; Announcer: Jeff Striegle; Announcer: Rusty Wallace	Backstretch: Dave Moody	Alex Hayden; Winston Kelley; Steve Post

== Standings after the race ==
Drivers' Championship standings after Chase reset

	Pos	Driver	Points
4	1	Jimmie Johnson	2,012
25	2	Kyle Busch	2,012 (–0)
4	3	Matt Kenseth	2,012 (–0)
2	4	Joey Logano	2,009 (–3)
4	5	Kevin Harvick	2,006 (–6)
3	6	Dale Earnhardt Jr.	2,006 (–6)
2	7	Kurt Busch	2,006 (–6)
4	8	Carl Edwards	2,006 (–6)
5	9	Brad Keselowski	2,003 (–9)
4	10	Martin Truex Jr.	2,003 (–9)
3	11	Denny Hamlin	2,003 (–9)
2	12	Jamie McMurray	2,000 (–12)
	13	Jeff Gordon	2,000 (–12)
3	14	Ryan Newman	2,000 (–12)
1	15	Paul Menard	2,000 (–12)
1	16	Clint Bowyer	2,000 (–12)

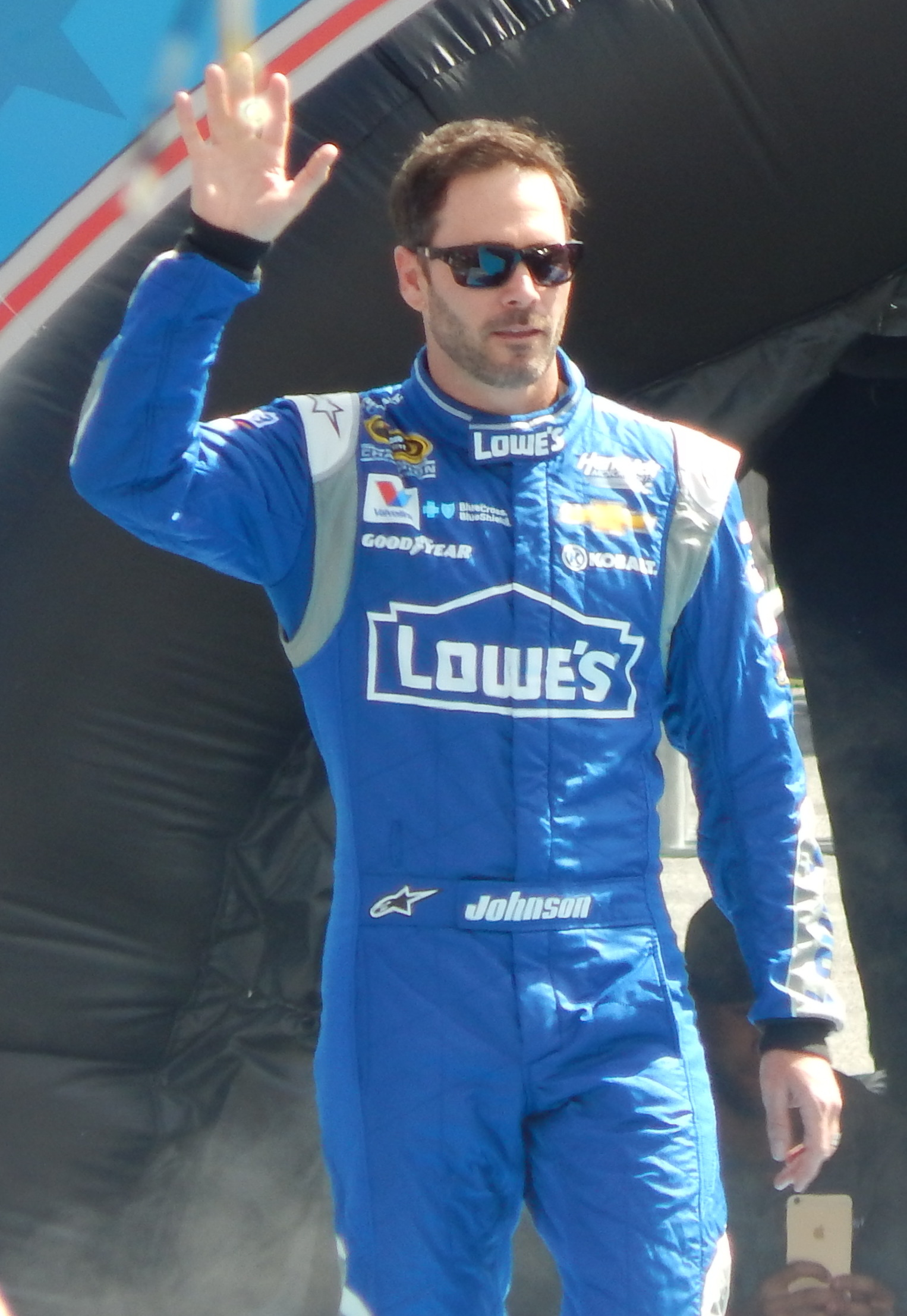
Jimmie Johnson left Richmond tied with Kyle Busch and Matt Kenseth for the points lead.

Manufacturers' Championship standings

Pos	Manufacturer	Points
1	Chevrolet	1,145
2	Toyota	1,091 (–54)
3	Ford	1,081 (–64)

- Note: Only the first sixteen positions are included for the driver standings.

Previous race: 2015 Bojangles' Southern 500	Sprint Cup Series; 2015 season	Next race: 2015 myAFibRisk.com 400
