= 2015 Sylvania 300 =

Race details
- Race 28 of 36 in the 2015 NASCAR Sprint Cup Series
- Date: September 27, 2015
- Location: New Hampshire Motor Speedway in Loudon, New Hampshire
- Course: Permanent racing facility
- Course length: 1.058 miles (1.703 km)
- Distance: 300 laps, 317.4 mi (510.9 km)
- Weather: Clear blue skies with a temperature of 69 °F (21 °C); wind out of the south/southwest at 7 mph (11 km/h)
- Average speed: 106.480 mph (171.363 km/h)

Pole position
Driver	Carl Edwards	Joe Gibbs Racing
- Time: 27.604

Most laps led
Driver	Kevin Harvick	Stewart–Haas Racing
- Laps: 216

Winner
No. 20	Matt Kenseth	Joe Gibbs Racing

Television in the United States
- Network: NBCSN
- Announcers: Rick Allen, Jeff Burton and Steve Letarte
- Nielsen ratings: 1.7/3 (Overnight); 1.8/3 (Final); 2.9 Million viewers

Radio in the United States
- Radio: PRN
- Booth announcers: Wendy Venturini and Mark Garrow
- Turn announcers: Rob Albright (1 & 2) and Pat Patterson (3 & 4)

The 2015 Sylvania 300 was a NASCAR Sprint Cup Series race held on September 27, 2015, at New Hampshire Motor Speedway in Loudon, New Hampshire. Contested over 300 laps on the 1.058 mile (2.4 km) speedway, it was the 28th race of the 2015 NASCAR Sprint Cup Series season, second race of the Chase and second race of the Challenger Round. Matt Kenseth won the race, his fifth of the season. Denny Hamlin finished second. Joey Logano, Greg Biffle and Carl Edwards rounded out the top-five.

Edwards won the pole for the race and led 19 laps on his way to a fifth–place finish. Kevin Harvick led a race high of 216 laps before running out of gas with three laps to go and finished 21st. The race had 16 lead changes amongst seven different drivers, nine caution flag periods for 41 laps and one red flag period for six minutes and four seconds.

This was the 36th career win for Kenseth, fifth of the season, second at New Hampshire Motor Speedway and eighth at the track for Joe Gibbs Racing. His points lead grew to six over Denny Hamlin. Despite being the winning manufacturer, Toyota left Loudon trailing Chevrolet by 40–points in the manufacturer standings.

The Sylvania 300 was carried by NBC Sports on the cable/satellite NBCSN network for the American television audience. The radio broadcast for the race was carried by the Performance Racing Network and Sirius XM NASCAR Radio.

== Report ==
=== Background ===
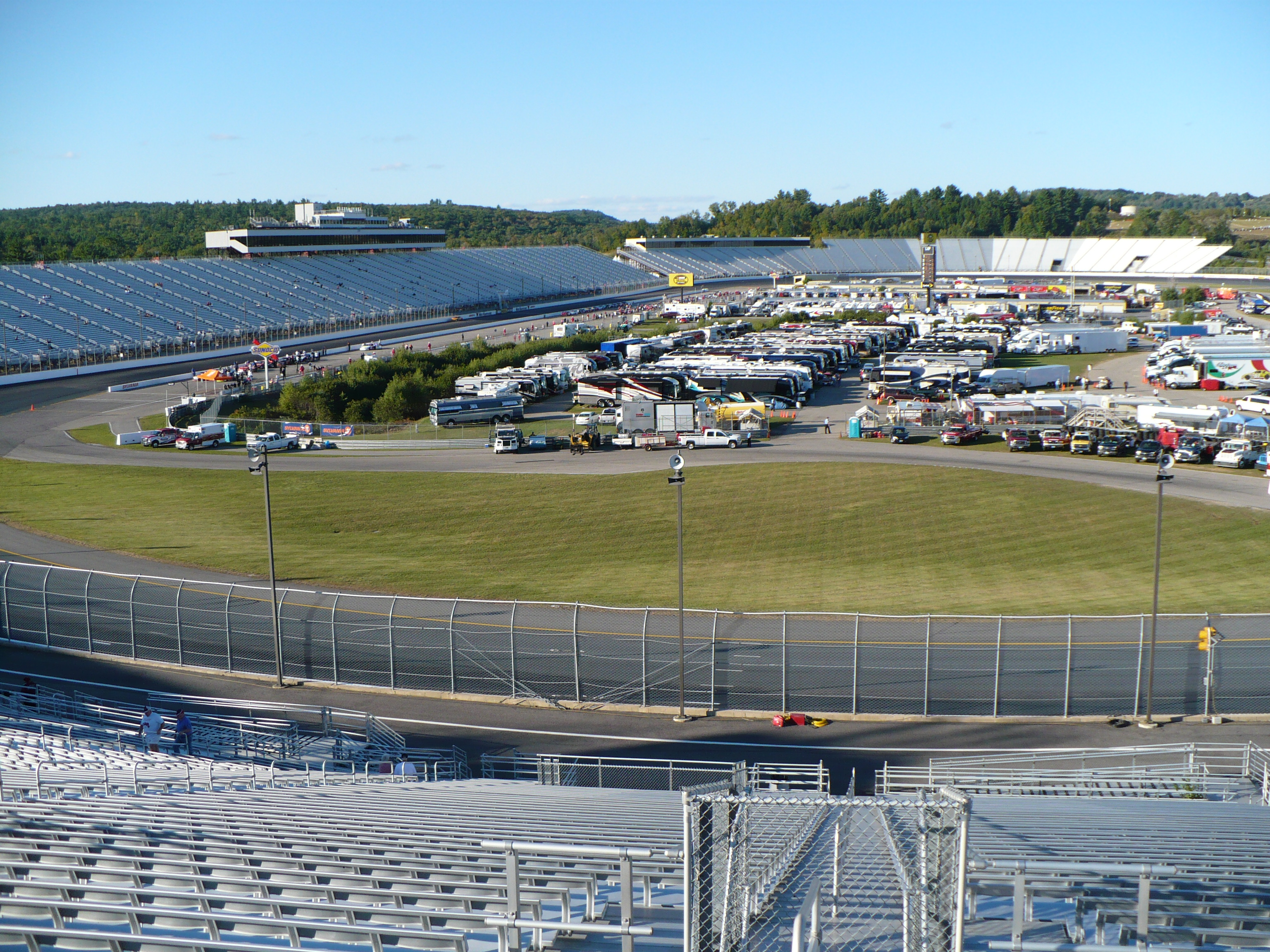
New Hampshire Motor Speedway, the track where the race was held.

New Hampshire Motor Speedway is a 1.058 mi (1.703 km) oval track in Loudon, New Hampshire. Matt Kenseth entered Loudon with a two–point lead over Denny Hamlin. Carl Edwards and Kyle Busch entered tied for third three–points back. Kurt Busch and Joey Logano entered tied for fifth four–points back. Jimmie Johnson entered seventh seven–points back. Ryan Newman entered eighth 12–points back. Brad Keselowski entered ninth 13–points back. Dale Earnhardt Jr. entered 10th 14–points back. Martin Truex Jr. entered 11th 17–points back. Jeff Gordon, the only driver to have started every race at Loudon and made his 42nd and final start at the track, entered 12th 21–points back. Jamie McMurray entered 13th 24–points back. Paul Menard entered 14th 25–points back. Kevin Harvick entered 15th 43–points back. Clint Bowyer entered 16th 52–points back.

==== New NASCAR record ====
Jeff Gordon, who made his first career start in the 1992 Hooters 500 at what was then Atlanta International Raceway, surpassed Ricky Rudd's record of 788 consecutive starts and became NASCAR's all-time iron man when he made his 789th consecutive start. Although proud of the mark, he said that drivers like Rudd and Terry Labonte "are way tougher than me. I've never had to tape my eyelids open to make the race (referring to how Ricky Rudd famously taped his eyes open to race in the 1984 Daytona 500 after suffering a concussion in the previous week's Busch Clash). When you think of those guys and the conditions of the cars, they didn't have any kind of air conditioning, they dealt with some major injuries and fought through. I've had some injuries along the way that I've had to fight through, so I have a taste of it, but certainly nothing like those guys."

==== Entry list ====
The entry list for the Sylvania 300 was released on Monday, September 21 at 9:00 a.m. Eastern time. Forty–four cars were entered for the race. All were entered for the previous week's race at Chicagoland. Four driver changes from the previous race took place for this race: Josh Wise drove the No. 26 BK Racing Toyota, Jeffrey Earnhardt drove the No. 32 Go FAS Racing Ford, B. J. McLeod made his first career Sprint Cup Series start in the No. 33 Hillman-Circle Sport LLC Chevrolet, Timmy Hill returned to the seat of the No. 62 Premium Motorsports Chevrolet and Ryan Preece – 2013 NASCAR Whelen Modified Tour champion – made his first career Sprint Cup Series start in the No. 98 Premium Motorsports Ford.

No.	Driver	Team	Manufacturer
1	Jamie McMurray	Chip Ganassi Racing	Chevrolet
2	Brad Keselowski (PC3)	Team Penske	Ford
3	Austin Dillon	Richard Childress Racing	Chevrolet
4	Kevin Harvick (PC1)	Stewart–Haas Racing	Chevrolet
5	Kasey Kahne	Hendrick Motorsports	Chevrolet
6	Trevor Bayne	Roush Fenway Racing	Ford
7	Alex Bowman	Tommy Baldwin Racing	Chevrolet
9	Sam Hornish Jr.	Richard Petty Motorsports	Ford
10	Danica Patrick	Stewart–Haas Racing	Chevrolet
11	Denny Hamlin	Joe Gibbs Racing	Toyota
13	Casey Mears	Germain Racing	Chevrolet
14	Tony Stewart (PC4)	Stewart–Haas Racing	Chevrolet
15	Clint Bowyer	Michael Waltrip Racing	Toyota
16	Greg Biffle	Roush Fenway Racing	Ford
17	Ricky Stenhouse Jr.	Roush Fenway Racing	Ford
18	Kyle Busch	Joe Gibbs Racing	Toyota
19	Carl Edwards	Joe Gibbs Racing	Toyota
20	Matt Kenseth (PC6)	Joe Gibbs Racing	Toyota
22	Joey Logano	Team Penske	Ford
23	Jeb Burton (R)	BK Racing	Toyota
24	Jeff Gordon (PC7)	Hendrick Motorsports	Chevrolet
26	Josh Wise	BK Racing	Toyota
27	Paul Menard	Richard Childress Racing	Chevrolet
30	Travis Kvapil (i)	The Motorsports Group	Chevrolet
31	Ryan Newman	Richard Childress Racing	Chevrolet
32	Jeffrey Earnhardt (i)	Go FAS Racing	Ford
33	B. J. McLeod (i)	Hillman-Circle Sport LLC	Chevrolet
34	Brett Moffitt (R)	Front Row Motorsports	Ford
35	Cole Whitt	Front Row Motorsports	Ford
38	David Gilliland	Front Row Motorsports	Ford
40	Landon Cassill (i)	Hillman-Circle Sport LLC	Chevrolet
41	Kurt Busch (PC5)	Stewart–Haas Racing	Chevrolet
42	Kyle Larson	Chip Ganassi Racing	Chevrolet
43	Aric Almirola	Richard Petty Motorsports	Ford
46	Michael Annett	HScott Motorsports	Chevrolet
47	A. J. Allmendinger	JTG Daugherty Racing	Chevrolet
48	Jimmie Johnson (PC2)	Hendrick Motorsports	Chevrolet
51	Justin Allgaier	HScott Motorsports	Chevrolet
55	David Ragan	Michael Waltrip Racing	Toyota
62	Timmy Hill (i)	Premium Motorsports	Chevrolet
78	Martin Truex Jr.	Furniture Row Racing	Chevrolet
83	Matt DiBenedetto (R)	BK Racing	Toyota
88	Dale Earnhardt Jr.	Hendrick Motorsports	Chevrolet
98	Ryan Preece	Premium Motorsports	Chevrolet
Official initial entry list
Official final entry list

Key	Meaning
(R)	Rookie
(i)	Ineligible for points
(PC#)	Past champions provisional

== Practice ==
=== First practice ===
Carl Edwards was the fastest in the first practice session with a time of 27.823 and a speed of 136.894 mph (220.310 km/h).

Pos	No.	Driver	Team	Manufacturer	Time	Speed
1	19	Carl Edwards	Joe Gibbs Racing	Toyota	27.823	136.894
2	48	Jimmie Johnson	Hendrick Motorsports	Chevrolet	27.942	136.311
3	2	Brad Keselowski	Team Penske	Ford	27.974	136.155
Official first practice results

=== Second practice ===
Carl Edwards was the fastest in the second practice session with a time of 28.527 and a speed of 133.516 mph (214.873 km/h). Roughly 22 minutes into the session, Jeffrey Earnhardt locked up the brakes and slammed the wall in turn 1.

Pos	No.	Driver	Team	Manufacturer	Time	Speed
1	19	Carl Edwards	Joe Gibbs Racing	Toyota	28.527	133.516
2	4	Kevin Harvick	Stewart–Haas Racing	Chevrolet	28.546	133.427
3	2	Brad Keselowski	Team Penske	Ford	28.552	133.399
Official second practice results

=== Final practice ===
Kevin Harvick was the fastest in the final practice session with a time of 28.302 and a speed of 134.577 mph (216.581 km/h).

Pos	No.	Driver	Team	Manufacturer	Time	Speed
1	4	Kevin Harvick	Stewart–Haas Racing	Chevrolet	28.302	134.577
2	18	Kyle Busch	Joe Gibbs Racing	Toyota	28.392	134.150
3	2	Brad Keselowski	Team Penske	Ford	28.417	134.032
Official final practice results

== Qualifying ==
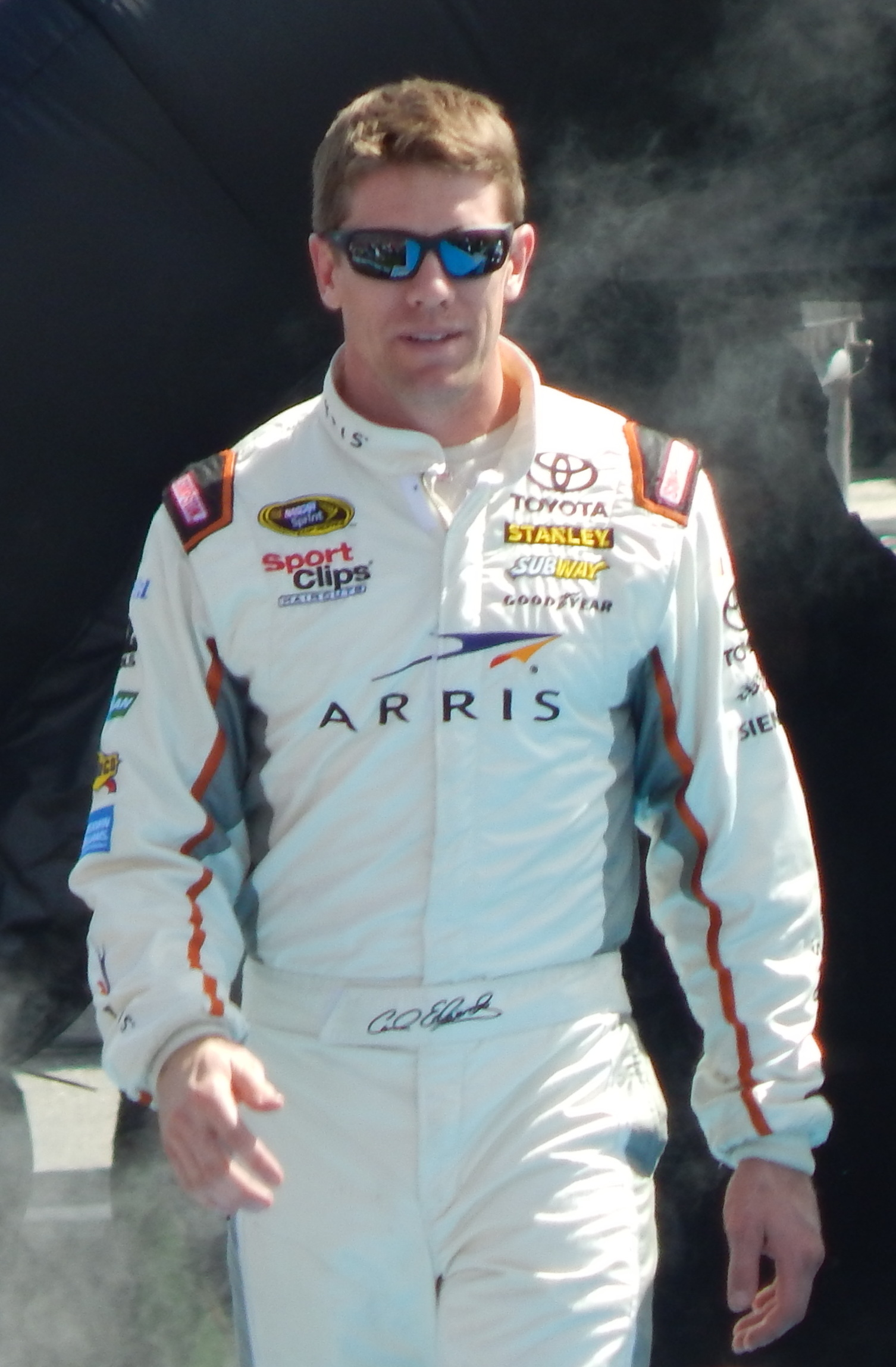
Carl Edwards, seen here at the 2015 Daytona 500, scored the pole for the race.

Carl Edwards won the pole with a time of 27.604 and a speed of 137.980 mph (222.057 km/h). Edwards stated that Loudon is "a tough place to decide where to be aggressive. This place is simple, so it’s pretty straight forward, but one little mistake here or there can cost you a lot. I really had to step it up. We got a great start to the Chase and we're keeping it rolling. We knew qualifying was important so we worked on it a lot today.” Kevin Harvick, after qualifying second, said that he "left it down in one and two down there, I just wasn’t too aggressive." Brad Keselowski – after qualifying fourth – said that for his team, they "just need to have a good, solid day. If we can win, that would be great. That’s what we want to do. That’s what we’re here to do, but a solid day would almost guarantee us advancing to the next round. The most important thing is to win Homestead and we want to be there when it counts.” Travis Kvapil failed to make the race.

=== Qualifying results ===
Pos	No.	Driver	Team	Manufacturer	R1	R2	R3
1	19	Carl Edwards	Joe Gibbs Racing	Toyota	27.840	27.792	27.604
2	4	Kevin Harvick	Stewart–Haas Racing	Chevrolet	27.843	27.664	27.631
3	41	Kurt Busch	Stewart–Haas Racing	Chevrolet	27.661	27.752	27.640
4	2	Brad Keselowski	Team Penske	Ford	27.760	27.734	27.666
5	48	Jimmie Johnson	Hendrick Motorsports	Chevrolet	27.938	27.640	27.676
6	42	Kyle Larson	Chip Ganassi Racing	Chevrolet	27.741	27.641	27.697
7	11	Denny Hamlin	Joe Gibbs Racing	Toyota	28.035	27.748	27.709
8	22	Joey Logano	Team Penske	Ford	27.955	27.758	27.725
9	31	Ryan Newman	Richard Childress Racing	Chevrolet	27.943	27.777	27.797
10	24	Jeff Gordon	Hendrick Motorsports	Chevrolet	27.844	27.741	27.887
11	88	Dale Earnhardt Jr.	Hendrick Motorsports	Chevrolet	27.967	27.812	27.891
12	5	Kasey Kahne	Hendrick Motorsports	Chevrolet	27.847	27.723	27.931
13	20	Matt Kenseth	Joe Gibbs Racing	Toyota	27.828	27.813	—
14	17	Ricky Stenhouse Jr.	Roush Fenway Racing	Ford	27.868	27.837	—
15	43	Aric Almirola	Richard Petty Motorsports	Ford	27.869	27.863	—
16	3	Austin Dillon	Richard Childress Racing	Chevrolet	27.903	27.900	—
17	18	Kyle Busch	Joe Gibbs Racing	Toyota	28.037	27.922	—
18	55	David Ragan	Michael Waltrip Racing	Toyota	27.896	27.932	—
19	13	Casey Mears	Germain Racing	Chevrolet	28.025	27.943	—
20	27	Paul Menard	Richard Childress Racing	Chevrolet	27.957	27.989	—
21	78	Martin Truex Jr.	Furniture Row Racing	Chevrolet	28.003	27.996	—
22	10	Danica Patrick	Stewart–Haas Racing	Chevrolet	27.884	28.016	—
23	1	Jamie McMurray	Chip Ganassi Racing	Chevrolet	28.032	28.106	—
24	51	Justin Allgaier	HScott Motorsports	Chevrolet	27.939	28.144	—
25	16	Greg Biffle	Roush Fenway Racing	Ford	28.048	—	—
26	15	Clint Bowyer	Michael Waltrip Racing	Toyota	28.053	—	—
27	14	Tony Stewart	Stewart–Haas Racing	Chevrolet	28.078	—	—
28	35	Cole Whitt	Front Row Motorsports	Ford	28.087	—	—
29	9	Sam Hornish Jr.	Richard Petty Motorsports	Ford	28.098	—	—
30	47	A. J. Allmendinger	JTG Daugherty Racing	Chevrolet	28.120	—	—
31	34	Brett Moffitt (R)	Front Row Motorsports	Ford	28.144	—	—
32	40	Landon Cassill (i)	Hillman-Circle Sport LLC	Chevrolet	28.188	—	—
33	6	Trevor Bayne	Roush-Fenway Racing	Ford	28.209	—	—
34	38	David Gilliland	Front Row Motorsports	Ford	28.293	—	—
35	83	Matt DiBenedetto (R)	BK Racing	Toyota	28.337	—	—
36	7	Alex Bowman	Tommy Baldwin Racing	Chevrolet	28.362	—	—
37	98	Ryan Preece	Premium Motorsports	Chevrolet	28.399	—	—
38	46	Michael Annett	HScott Motorsports	Chevrolet	28.519	—	—
39	33	B. J. McLeod (i)	Hillman-Circle Sport LLC	Chevrolet	28.740	—	—
40	26	Josh Wise	BK Racing	Toyota	28.808	—	—
41	23	Jeb Burton (R)	BK Racing	Toyota	28.816	—	—
42	32	Jeffrey Earnhardt (i) (Note: Jeffrey Earnhardt started from the rear of the field for a rear-gear change.)	Go FAS Racing	Ford	28.866	—	—
43	62	Timmy Hill (i)	Premium Motorsports	Chevrolet	29.326	—	—
Failed to qualify
44	30	Travis Kvapil (i)	The Motorsports Group	Chevrolet	28.724	—	—
Official qualifying results

== Race ==
=== First half ===
==== Start ====
Under clear blue New England skies, Carl Edwards led the field to the green flag at 2:19 p.m. Kevin Harvick kept the second position for the first 10 laps. He got under Edwards in turn 1 on lap 18, but couldn't get the run off the turn and remained in second. Edwards got high exiting turn 1 and lost the lead to Harvick on lap 21. Lapped traffic allowed him to pull away to a one-second lead by lap 25. The first caution of the race flew on lap 37 when Aric Almirola got the car turning on entry, but then shot up the track and slammed the wall. He finished a disappointing 43rd. Harvick swapped the lead on pit road with Brad Keselowski, but exited with that position. Austin Dillon was tagged for speeding on pit road and restarted the race from the tail-end of the field.

The race restarted on lap 44. The second caution flew on lap 48 when Landon Cassill blew an engine in turn 4. The issue stemmed from a loss of power steering.

The race restarted on lap 53. Harvick began pulling away from Keselowski. The third caution flew on lap 60 when Tony Stewart blew his left-front tire out after making contact with Martin Truex Jr. on the restart and veered toward the wall. Luckily, he didn't make contact with it and pulled his car down pit road.

==== Second quarter ====
The race restarted on lap 65. Kevin Harvick drove away to a three and a half second lead over Brad Keselowski by lap 85. The fourth caution of the race flew on lap 120 for a single-car wreck in turn 4. Rounding the turn, Alex Bowman suffered a right-front tire blowout and slammed the wall. Harvick swapped the lead on pit road with Keselowski, but exited with the lead. Casey Mears was tagged for an uncontrolled tire and restarted the race from the tail-end of the field.

The race restarted on lap 125. The fifth caution of the race flew on lap 158 for a single-car wreck in turn 4. Kyle Busch suffered a right-front tire blowout and slammed the wall. Crew chief Adam Stevens said that the car had "just came off almost a green flag run and the tires looked fine, the balance was a little off and then had that short run there and the handling went away and just blew a right front. It looks like it just had a slow leak and just overworked the shoulder and finally blew out, but the balance was free, so it’s not like we abused it – especially after we just went a fuel run, you know what I mean? Just one of those things that happens – sometimes you get a pinhole or run something over and we found the fence.” Harvick swapped the lead on pit road with Keselowski, but exited with the lead. Carl Edwards was tagged for removing equipment out of the pit box and restarted the race from the tail-end of the field.

=== Second half ===
==== Halfway ====
The race restarted on lap 165. Kevin Harvick pulled to a two-second lead after nine laps. Debris in turn 3 brought out the sixth caution of the race on lap 192. Harvick swapped the lead with Keselowski on pit road, only this time he didn't exit with it. Matt Kenseth exited with the lead after taking just right-side tires.

The race restarted on lap 197. Jimmie Johnson was running third when he cut down his left-front tire on lap 200. He rejoined the race in 29th one lap down. The seventh caution of the race flew for a two-car wreck in turn 1. Going into the turn, Ryan Newman got loose and sent Danica Patrick spinning into the wall. She made contact with the wall, slid back down the track and got t-boned by David Ragan. After a voluntary visit to the infield care center (she wasn't required to visit it since she drove her car back to the garage), she said that she was "on track to have a potentially good finish today. It was kind of back and forth with the two- and four-tire cycle that was happening but definitely on the long run with everyone with four tires or with everyone kind of stringing out we had gotten all the way up to 12th. It sucks. It seems like nothing ever goes wrong on those days that you’re just trudging along in 27th, you know? It only happens when you’re having a good race." Ragan commented that he didn't "know what happened to her, but typically when you hit the wall you hold onto the brakes, you lock it down -- you try not to come back across the track. I saw her coming back down and I was trying. I didn’t want to lock my brakes up because I knew I would hit her, so I was trying to just get it as low as I could and just couldn’t get it as low as I needed to. Unfortunate to get involved in a wreck like that. Just one of those deals. I hate it for everybody that works on these race cars. We needed a good finish today, but I wish that she would have locked her brakes up and would have stayed up on the wall." The race was red-flagged after the blue foam blocks that cover the sides of the roll cage were destroyed and scattered all over the turn. It was lifted after six minutes.

The race restarted on lap 210. The next lap, Kevin Harvick passed Kenseth for the lead just as the eighth caution of the race flew for a single-car wreck on the backstretch involving Brett Moffitt. Kenseth opted not to pit under the caution and assumed the lead.

The race restarted on lap 215. Denny Hamlin drove by teammate Matt Kenseth in turn 3 to take the lead with 81 laps to go. The ninth caution of the race flew with 63 laps to go for a single-car wreck in turn 3. Justin Allgaier suffered a right-front tire blowout and slammed the wall. Greg Biffle opted not to pit under the caution and assumed the lead.

==== Fourth quarter ====
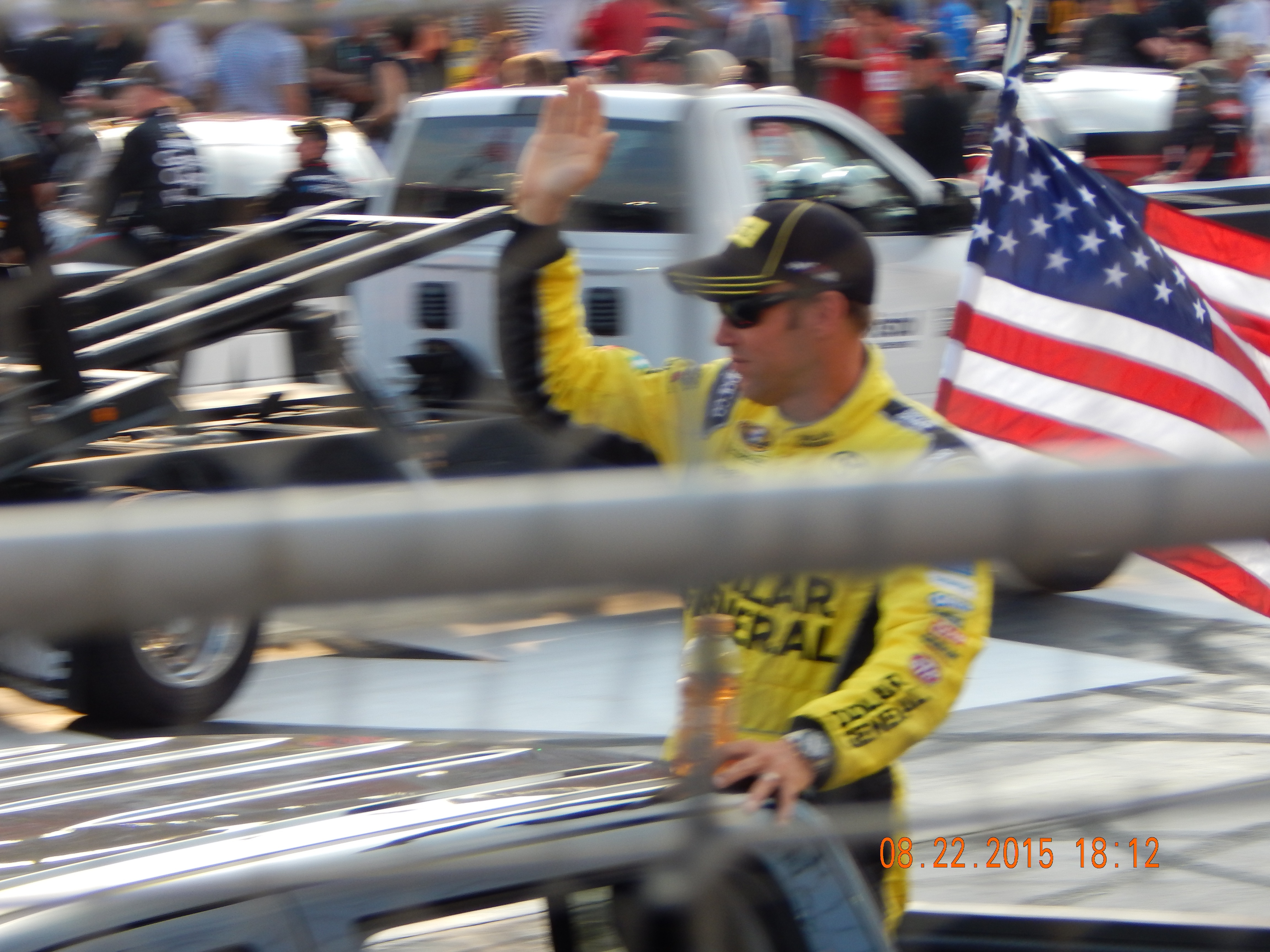
Matt Kenseth, seen here at Bristol, scored his 36th career victory at the Magic Mile.

“We looked at all the data available to us, all the video, we have the senior official on the ground. We made sure the rules are very clear to everybody, especially in the last couple drivers meetings, to be sure we had everybody informed. It was very clear-cut in our mind based on the video we had, the different angles that we had. By having the individual on the ground directly across from the restart box, they can really get a good understanding and allow us to feel 100 percent that we stamped it with a very good decision.”

— Richard Buck, Sprint Cup managing director speaking to reporters after the race.

The race restarted with 58 laps to go. NASCAR decided to review the restart and black-flagged Brad Keselowski for a restart violation. He was forced to serve a drive-through penalty. After the race, he said that he "got the chance to do something again for the first time. The first person to ever be penalized for jumping a restart when I didn’t pass anyone, so that’s a new one, but we moved on and we made the most of a good day with the Miller Lite Ford and got a solid finish that hopefully will make our Dover a little bit easier, so that was good.” NASCAR Managing Director Richard Buck told reporters after the race that "it was very clear-cut in our minds" that Keselowski had jumped the start. He also added that the sanctioning body is "not out to get anybody, [b]ut we're the keeper of the rules and the enforcer of the rules. All anybody asks for in this garage area is to be treated fairly, and we believe we did our job today."

After drag-racing Biffle down the backstretch, Kevin Harvick took back the lead with 48 laps to go. In the closing 15 laps, Matt Kenseth began stalking Harvick who was borderline on making the finish having last pitted on lap 212 and the fuel window being 76 laps. He didn't have enough, lost the lead and finished a disappointing 21st. Unsurprisingly, he left the track without speaking to the media. But he sent out a tweet an hour after the race that simply stated "Fast car. Great day. Bad ending." Kenseth inherited the lead and scored his 36th career victory.

== Post-race ==
=== Driver comments ===
Kenseth said of his victory that he "had to be there to win it. I was giving Kevin everything I had. I thought he had us beat. He had the better car." He added that he "had to pit that one time today and (crew chief) Jason’s (Ratcliff) like 'it’s fine, relax.' We made it to the front faster I thought. I was giving Kevin everything I got, I thought he was gonna beat us, he had a better car today, I guess he was a little short on fuel.”

Speaking on his third–place finish, Joey Logano said that he would "take it. It was a blue collar day. It maybe wasn't the fastest car and maybe not even a top–five car at times, but we did a good job working on it."

After saving enough fuel to notch a fourth–place finish – his third of 2015 – Greg Biffle said that he felt "really good about this run, especially when we got out in clean air [and realized] how fast the car was. Our Ford Fusion ran really good, and we’re happy to have Kleen Performance on it this week, but we still have a little bit of work to do. They were on a little bit better tires than we were[.] [S]o they showed a little bit more speed than we did right there – the No. 4, the No. 11 and the No. 20 – but I was trying to save a little bit of gas too. I knew I had a long ways to go if we were going to make it that far, so it was a great run for us.”

After falling to 23rd one–lap down following flat left-front tire at lap 200 and rallying to a sixth–place finish, Jimmie Johnson said that the whole ordeal "was really weird. I went into Turn 3 and got on the brakes and the car traveled and slowed down. It felt like something broke in the left-front, but they said there was a lugnut inside the wheel. I guess when I hit the brakes to slow down a lugnut hit the valve stem and took the tire out. Fortunately some cautions fell in quick order to let us get back on the lead lap. We had a solid car and got up there to ninth or something and some guys ran out of fuel and got us to sixth.”

After struggling all day and rallying to a seventh–place finish in his record setting 789th career start, Jeff Gordon said that his team "had a bunch of things that didn't go our way, and then luckily there at the very end, we had it go our way where we came in and got four tires, had a decent restart and we were able to drive all the way up there."

While neither Kevin Harvick nor crew chief Rodney Childers opted to speak to the media after the race (only the top–three finishers are obligated to do so), Childers took to Twitter roughly 90 minutes after the race with a screen grab of a note explaining why he wasn't worried about the team's fuel situation in a tweet titled "Great car all weekend.. To our real fans that actually care.. Not the ones that are jackasses.. Here ya go..".

=== Media comments ===
“From now on, NASCAR must rule with the iron hand they displayed Sunday in the Granite State. They must go by the absolute letter of the law, treating a one-inch violation the same as a mile. The stage is set for the 2015 championship to be decided – not by the drivers – but by a sadly embattled man in an official’s uniform, forced to black-flag the leader at Homestead Miami Speedway for gassing it up three inches early in an attempt to secure the greatest prize our sport has to offer. No more common sense, enough of discretion. All we’ll have left is the empty ache created by the witless desire for consistency at all costs.”

— MRN lead turn announcer and host of Sirius XM Speedway on Sirius XM NASCAR Radio Dave Moody giving his thoughts on the issue with restarts.

Brad Keselowski being black-flagged for jumping the final restart of the race added to an ongoing issue regarding NASCAR's enforcement, or lack thereof, of drivers jumping the restarts to gain an advantage. Several members of the NASCAR media gave their thoughts regarding the issue of restarts as a whole and whether NASCAR was right to black flag Keselowski.

Dave Moody of the Motor Racing Network said that because fans and drivers don't want NASCAR to show discretion but enforce down to the letter of the law, they should "[b]e careful what you wish for. Because you just got it."

Pete Pistone of MRN said that, while he didn't believe Keselowski jumped the start, there was no doubt "with restarts now under more scrutiny and officiating ramped up, Keselowski got flagged" when he wouldn't have felt the wrath of the sanctioning body two weeks ago.

Matt Weaver of Popular Speed said that "[s]ometimes[,] you get what you asked for[,] but never truly underst[and] what you were getting until it was too late" and that by black-flagging Keselowski, "NASCAR has now set a standard in which all future restarts will be judged."

Darrell Waltrip of Fox Sports said that while Keselowski maybe "did go a dog-hair early...he didn't pass the leader" and that "it should have been 'no harm, no foul.'" He also added that the issue will continue "to grow and quite honestly, I don't think we've seen the end of it yet."

In ESPN.com's weekly NASCAR's burning questions series, NASCAR analysts and writers Ricky Craven, Ryan McGhee, John Oreovicz and Bob Pockrass gave their answers if NASCAR made "the right call on Brad Keselowski's restart penalty." Craven said NASCAR made "the wrong decision to black-flag the leader for gaining nothing. Restarts in the past few years have become a flavorful, entertaining component of NASCAR racing. I had no problem with not black-flagging Jeff Gordon the week before ... until Brad got punished for doing much, much less." McGhee said "by the letter of the law, it was the right call. But ultimately, it's not really a penalty unless there was intent or an advantage gained. I don't think there was any blatant intent, even Greg Biffle said that. And there was certainly no advantage gained. But this is like pit-road speeding used to be. Guys complained and complained about the way it was policed, it received more attention and received more rules-writing ... and well, be careful what you wish for, fellas!" Oreovicz said it looked "a lot more like the No. 16 slowed unexpectedly, whether through wheelspin or gamesmanship. Tricking your rival has been part of the restart game long before NASCAR began examining things under a microscope. I don't think this violation was blatant enough to warrant calling." Pockrass said that NASCAR technically "may have been right (it is difficult from the replays we saw to determine that he truly jumped the restart)," but that giving him a drive-through "certainly didn't seem to fit the crime. The perception is that NASCAR is being heavy-handed and that adds to the confusion, ultimately hurting NACAR's credibility. This at the very least shows that NASCAR should adopt a rule similar to its Daytona/Talladega yellow-line rule that if a driver gives back any position gained with an illegal restart, there is no penalty."

=== NASCAR comments ===
“It's our job to utilize all the technology we have available to us and make the call. Not everyone is going to agree with that. There's a ton on the line each and every race, and so ultimately we've got to make a call. It's difficult to do, but that's our job. We'll certainly seek feedback from the drivers. We'll talk to Brad obviously today, get his feedback, which I'm sure we'll disagree but that's part of it, and then we'll head into Dover.”

— Steve O'Donnell, NASCAR executive vice-president and chief racing development officer, speaking to NASCAR.com about the final restart.

On the Monday following the race, NASCAR Executive Vice-President and Chief Racing Development Officer Steve O'Donnell explained to Zach Albert of NASCAR.com the reason for NASCAR stepping up tighter enforcement of the restarts. Speaking on behalf of the sanctioning body, he said that it was their "job to utilize all the technology we have...and make a call" even though everyone isn't "going to agree with that." He also added that there's a lot "on the line each and every race, and so ultimately we've got to make a call."

== Race results ==
Pos	No.	Driver	Team	Manufacturer	Laps	Points
1	20	Matt Kenseth	Joe Gibbs Racing	Toyota	300	47
2	11	Denny Hamlin	Joe Gibbs Racing	Toyota	300	43
3	22	Joey Logano	Team Penske	Ford	300	41
4	16	Greg Biffle	Roush Fenway Racing	Ford	300	41
5	19	Carl Edwards	Joe Gibbs Racing	Toyota	300	40
6	48	Jimmie Johnson	Hendrick Motorsports	Chevrolet	300	38
7	24	Jeff Gordon	Hendrick Motorsports	Chevrolet	300	37
8	78	Martin Truex Jr.	Furniture Row Racing	Chevrolet	300	36
9	5	Kasey Kahne	Hendrick Motorsports	Chevrolet	300	35
10	31	Ryan Newman	Richard Childress Racing	Chevrolet	300	34
11	14	Tony Stewart	Stewart–Haas Racing	Chevrolet	300	33
12	2	Brad Keselowski	Team Penske	Ford	300	32
13	17	Ricky Stenhouse Jr.	Roush Fenway Racing	Ford	300	31
14	1	Jamie McMurray	Chip Ganassi Racing	Chevrolet	300	30
15	27	Paul Menard	Richard Childress Racing	Chevrolet	300	29
16	6	Trevor Bayne	Roush Fenway Racing	Ford	300	28
17	42	Kyle Larson	Chip Ganassi Racing	Chevrolet	300	27
18	13	Casey Mears	Germain Racing	Chevrolet	300	26
19	41	Kurt Busch	Stewart–Haas Racing	Chevrolet	299	25
20	9	Sam Hornish Jr.	Richard Petty Motorsports	Ford	299	24
21	4	Kevin Harvick	Stewart–Haas Racing	Chevrolet	299	25
22	3	Austin Dillon	Richard Childress Racing	Chevrolet	299	22
23	47	A. J. Allmendinger	JTG Daugherty Racing	Chevrolet	299	21
24	35	Cole Whitt	Front Row Motorsports	Ford	299	21
25	88	Dale Earnhardt Jr.	Hendrick Motorsports	Chevrolet	299	19
26	15	Clint Bowyer	Michael Waltrip Racing	Toyota	299	18
27	34	Brett Moffitt (R)	Front Row Motorsports	Ford	298	17
28	38	David Gilliland	Front Row Motorsports	Ford	297	16
29	46	Michael Annett	HScott Motorsports	Chevrolet	297	15
30	83	Matt DiBenedetto (R)	BK Racing	Toyota	297	14
31	26	Josh Wise	BK Racing	Toyota	297	13
32	98	Ryan Preece	Premium Motorsports	Chevrolet	296	12
33	23	Jeb Burton (R)	BK Racing	Toyota	295	11
34	33	B. J. McLeod	Hillman-Circle Sport LLC	Chevrolet	293	10
35	32	Jeffrey Earnhardt (i)	Go FAS Racing	Ford	292	0
36	62	Timmy Hill (i)	Premium Motorsports	Chevrolet	284	0
37	18	Kyle Busch	Joe Gibbs Racing	Toyota	262	7
38	40	Landon Cassill (i)	Hillman-Circle Sport LLC	Chevrolet	242	0
39	51	Justin Allgaier	HScott Motorsports	Chevrolet	236	5
40	10	Danica Patrick	Stewart–Haas Racing	Chevrolet	203	4
41	55	David Ragan	Michael Waltrip Racing	Toyota	203	3
42	7	Alex Bowman	Tommy Baldwin Racing	Chevrolet	117	2
43	43	Aric Almirola	Richard Petty Motorsports	Ford	35	1
Official Sylvania 300 results

=== Race statistics ===
- 16 lead changes among 7 different drivers
- 9 cautions for 41 laps; 1 red flag for 6:04
- Time of race: 2 hours, 58 minutes, 51 seconds
- Average speed: 106.480 mph (171.363 km/h)
- Matt Kenseth took home $257,276 in winnings

Lap Leaders
Laps	Leader
1-19	Carl Edwards
20-37	Kevin Harvick
38	Brad Keselowski
39	Cole Whitt
40-120	Kevin Harvick
121	Brad Keselowski
122-159	Kevin Harvick
160	Brad Keselowski
161-192	Kevin Harvick
193	Brad Keselowski
194-210	Matt Kenseth
211	Kevin Harvick
212-218	Matt Kenseth
219-239	Denny Hamlin
240-251	Greg Biffle
252-297	Kevin Harvick
298-300	Matt Kenseth

Total laps led
Leader	Laps
Kevin Harvick	216
Matt Kenseth	27
Denny Hamlin	21
Carl Edwards	19
Brad Keselowski	4
Cole Whitt	1

==== Race awards ====
- Coors Light Pole Award: Carl Edwards (27.604, 137.980 mph (222.057 km/h))
- 3M Lap Leader: Kevin Harvick (216 laps)
- American Ethanol Green Flag Restart Award: Brad Keselowski
- Duralast Brakes "Bake In The Race" Award: Kevin Harvick
- Freescale "Wide Open": Joey Logano
- Ingersoll Rand Power Move: Tony Stewart (5 positions)
- MAHLE Clevite Engine Builder of the Race: Toyota Racing Development, #19
- Mobil 1 Driver of the Race: Kevin Harvick (130.8 driver rating)
- Moog Steering and Suspension Problem Solver of The Race: Greg Biffle (crew chief Matt Puccia (0.389 seconds))
- NASCAR Sprint Cup Leader Bonus: Matt Kenseth $240,000
- Sherwin-Williams Fastest Lap: Denny Hamlin (Lap 218, 28.612, 133.119 mph (214.234 km/h))
- Sunoco Rookie of The Race: Brett Moffitt

== Media ==
=== Television ===
NBCSN covered the race on the television side. Rick Allen, Jeff Burton – the all-time wins leader at New Hampshire Motor Speedway with four wins – and Steve Letarte had the call in the booth for the race. Dave Burns, Mike Massaro, Marty Snider and Kelli Stavast handled pit road on the television side.

NBCSN
Booth announcers	Pit reporters
Lap-by-lap: Rick Allen; Color-commentator: Jeff Burton; Color-commentator: Steve Letarte	Dave Burns; Mike Massaro; Marty Snider; Kelli Stavast

=== Radio ===
PRN had the radio call for the race, which was simulcast on Sirius XM NASCAR Radio. Wendy Venturini and Mark Garrow called the race from the booth when the field was racing down the front stretch. Rob Albright called the race from a billboard outside of turn 2 when the field was racing through turns 1 and 2. Pat Patterson called the race from the turn 4 stands when the field was racing through turns 3 and 4. Brad Gillie, Brett McMillan, Steve Richards and Hermie Sadler handled pit road on the radio side.

PRN
Booth announcers	Turn announcers	Pit reporters
Lead announcer: Wendy Venturini; Announcer: Mark Garrow	Turns 1 & 2: Rob Albright; Turns 3 & 4: Pat Patterson	Brad Gillie; Brett McMillan; Steve Richards; Hermie Sadler

== Standings after the race ==
Drivers' Championship standings

	Pos	Driver	Points
	1	Matt Kenseth	2,099
	2	Denny Hamlin	2,093 (–6)
	3	Carl Edwards	2,089 (–10)
2	4	Joey Logano	2,089 (–10)
2	5	Jimmie Johnson	2,083 (–16)
2	6	Ryan Newman	2,074 (–25)
2	7	Kurt Busch	2,073 (–26)
1	8	Brad Keselowski	2,072 (–27)
2	9	Martin Truex Jr.	2,071 (–28)
2	10	Jeff Gordon	2,068 (–31)
2	11	Jamie McMurray	2,058 (–41)
2	12	Dale Earnhardt Jr.	2,057 (–42)
9	13	Kyle Busch	2,056 (–43)
	14	Paul Menard	2,056 (–43)
	15	Kevin Harvick	2,034 (–65)
	16	Clint Bowyer	2,018 (–81)

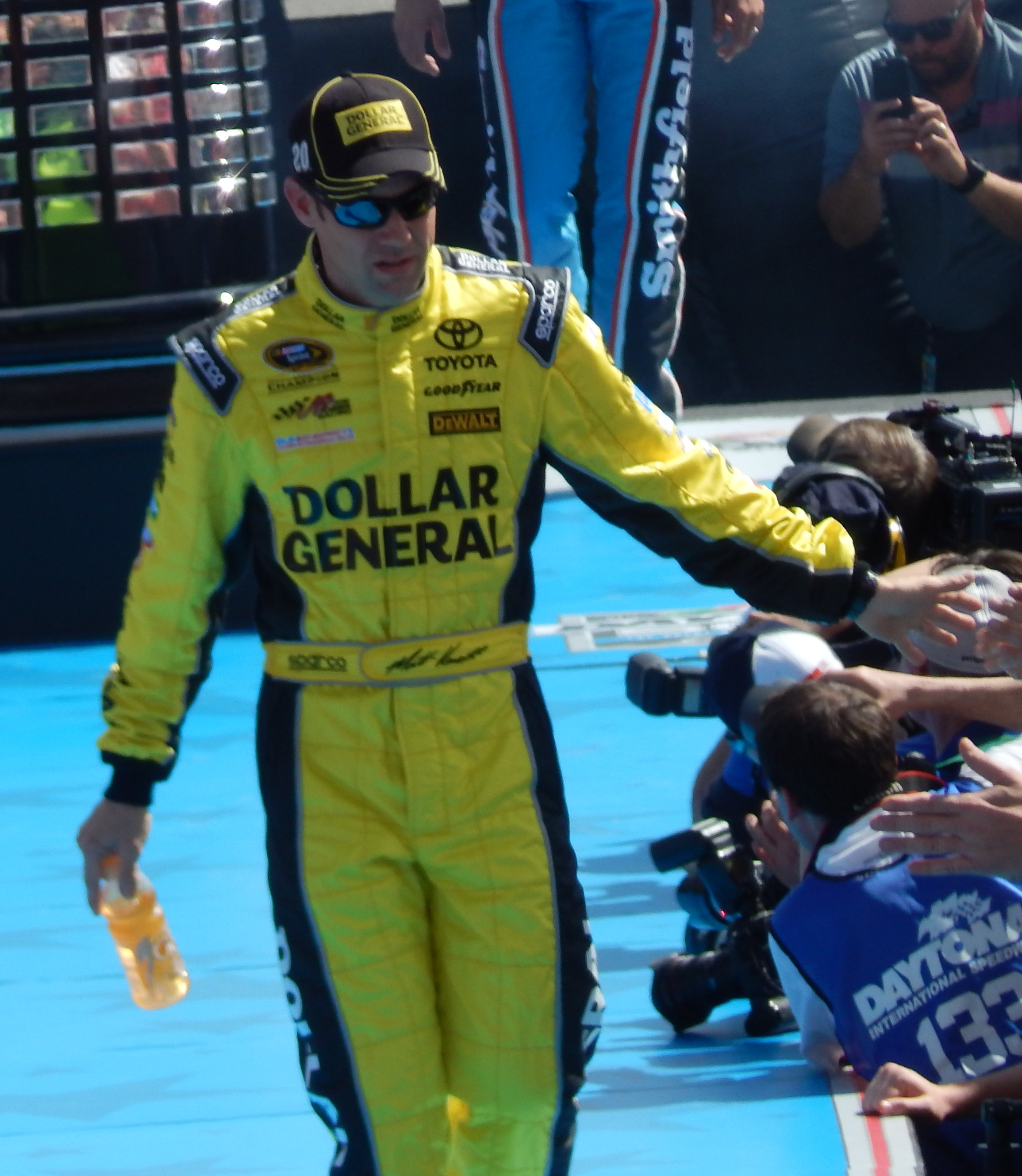
Matt Kenseth left Loudon with a six–point lead over Denny Hamlin.

Manufacturers' Championship standings

Pos	Manufacturer	Points
1	Chevrolet	1,225
2	Toyota	1,185 (–40)
3	Ford	1,161 (–64)

- Note: Only the first sixteen positions are included for the driver standings.

== Note ==
Previous race: 2015 myAFibRisk.com 400	Sprint Cup Series; 2015 season	Next race: 2015 AAA 400
