= 2015 Goody's Headache Relief Shot 500 =

33rd race of 2015 NASCAR Sprint Cup season

Race details
- Race 33 of 36 in the 2015 NASCAR Sprint Cup Series
- Date: November 1, 2015
- Location: Martinsville Speedway in Ridgeway, Virginia
- Course: Permanent racing facility
- Course length: .526 miles (.847 km)
- Distance: 500 laps, 263 mi (423.5 km)
- Weather: Cloudy skies with a temperature of 63 °F (17 °C); wind out of the southwest at 5 mph (8.0 km/h)
- Average speed: 69.643 mph (112.080 km/h)

Pole position
Driver	Joey Logano	Team Penske
- Time: 19.215

Most laps led
Driver	Joey Logano	Team Penske
- Laps: 207

Winner
No. 24	Jeff Gordon	Hendrick Motorsports

Television in the United States
- Network: NBCSN
- Announcers: Rick Allen, Jeff Burton and Steve Letarte
- Nielsen ratings: 1.9/3 (Overnight); 2.0/4 (Final); 3.3 Million viewers

Radio in the United States
- Radio: MRN
- Booth announcers: Joe Moore and Jeff Striegle
- Turn announcers: Dave Moody (Backstretch)

The 2015 Goody's Headache Relief Shot 500 was a NASCAR Sprint Cup Series race held on November 1, 2015, at Martinsville Speedway in Ridgeway, Virginia. Contested over 500 laps on the .526 mile (.847 km) short track, it was the 33rd race of the 2015 NASCAR Sprint Cup Series season, seventh race of the Chase and first race of the Eliminator Round. Jeff Gordon won the race, marking his first win of the season and also the last of his NASCAR career. Jamie McMurray finished second. Denny Hamlin, Dale Earnhardt Jr. and Kyle Busch rounded out the top-five.

Joey Logano won the pole for the race and led a race high of 207 laps before being taken out by Matt Kenseth late in the race and finished 37th. The race had 21 lead changes among nine different drivers, 18 caution flag periods for 109 laps and one red flag period for 12 minutes and 46 seconds, caused by the Kenseth-Logano collision, for which Kenseth received a two-race suspension.

This was the 93rd and final career win for Gordon, first of the season, ninth at Martinsville Speedway, 23rd at the track for Hendrick Motorsports and clinched Gordon a spot in the championship Ford EcoBoost 400 race at Homestead-Miami Speedway. He left Martinsville with an eight–point lead in the points standings. Chevrolet left with a 57–point lead over Toyota in the manufacturer standings.

The Goody's Headache Relief Shot 500 was carried by NBC Sports on the cable/satellite NBCSN network for the American television audience. The radio broadcast for the race was carried by the Motor Racing Network and Sirius XM NASCAR Radio.

== Report ==
=== Background ===
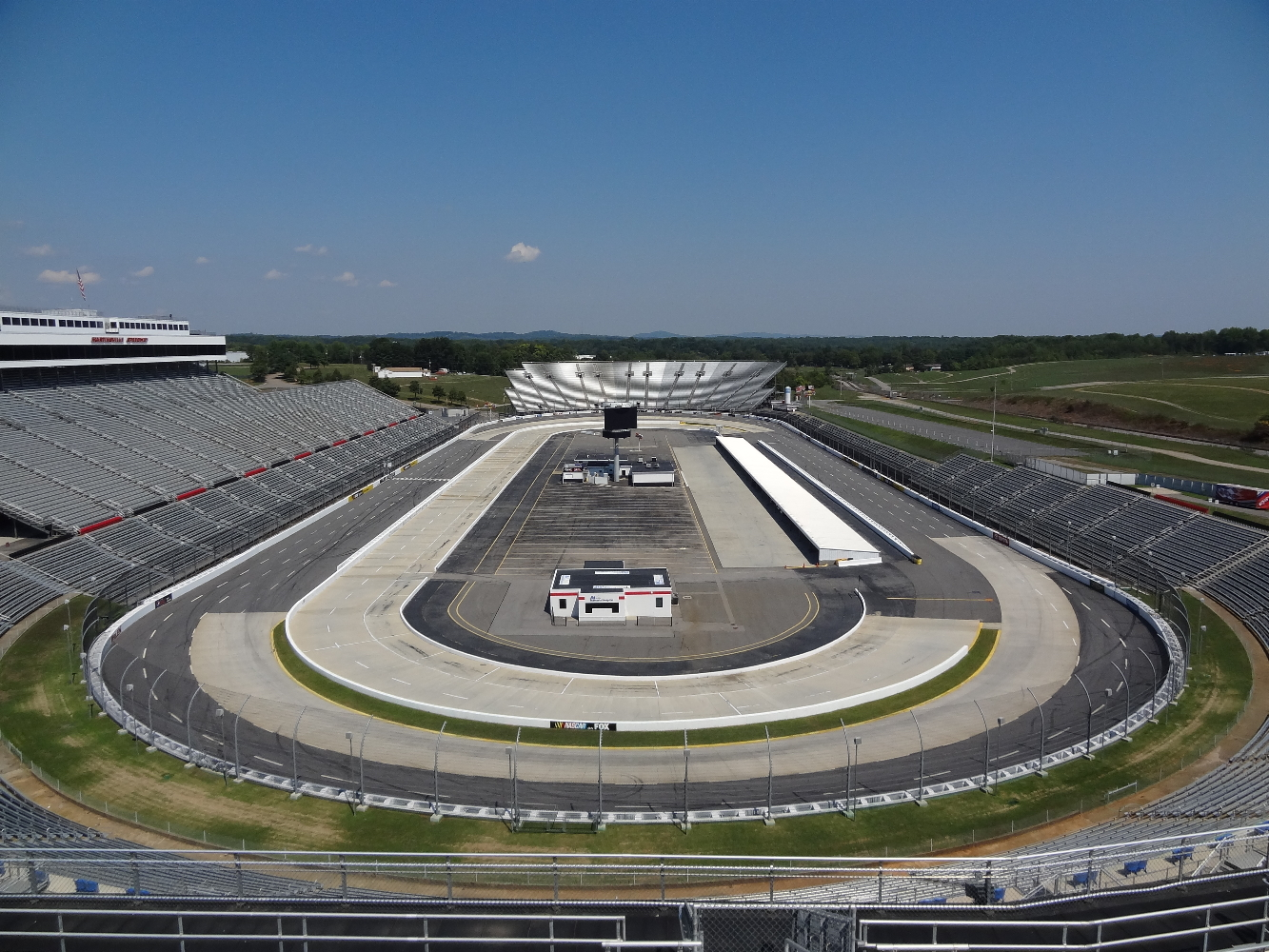
Martinsville Speedway, the track where the race was held.

Martinsville Speedway is a 0.526 mi (0.847 km) oval short track in Ridgeway, Virginia, United States, a community of Martinsville, Virginia. Eight drivers entered tied for the points lead.

==== Entry list ====
The entry list for the Goody's Headache Relief Shot 500 was released on Monday, October 26 at 2:56 p.m. Eastern time. Forty-three cars were entered for the race. All were entered for the previous week's race at Talladega. Kyle Fowler made his second career start in the No. 32 Go FAS Racing Ford. Alex Kennedy returned to the seat of the No. 33 Hillman-Circle Sport LLC Chevrolet. Brett Moffitt returned to the seat of the No. 34 Front Row Motorsports Ford. Ryan Preece made his second Sprint Cup Series start in the No. 98 Premium Motorsports Ford.

No.	Driver	Team	Manufacturer
1	Jamie McMurray	Chip Ganassi Racing	Chevrolet
2	Brad Keselowski (PC3)	Team Penske	Ford
3	Austin Dillon	Richard Childress Racing	Chevrolet
4	Kevin Harvick (PC1)	Stewart–Haas Racing	Chevrolet
5	Kasey Kahne	Hendrick Motorsports	Chevrolet
6	Trevor Bayne	Roush Fenway Racing	Ford
7	Alex Bowman	Tommy Baldwin Racing	Chevrolet
9	Sam Hornish Jr.	Richard Petty Motorsports	Ford
10	Danica Patrick	Stewart–Haas Racing	Chevrolet
11	Denny Hamlin	Joe Gibbs Racing	Toyota
13	Casey Mears	Germain Racing	Chevrolet
14	Tony Stewart (PC4)	Stewart–Haas Racing	Chevrolet
15	Clint Bowyer	Michael Waltrip Racing	Toyota
16	Greg Biffle	Roush Fenway Racing	Ford
17	Ricky Stenhouse Jr.	Roush Fenway Racing	Ford
18	Kyle Busch	Joe Gibbs Racing	Toyota
19	Carl Edwards	Joe Gibbs Racing	Toyota
20	Matt Kenseth (PC6)	Joe Gibbs Racing	Toyota
22	Joey Logano	Team Penske	Ford
23	Jeb Burton (R)	BK Racing	Toyota
24	Jeff Gordon (PC7)	Hendrick Motorsports	Chevrolet
26	J. J. Yeley (i)	BK Racing	Toyota
27	Paul Menard	Richard Childress Racing	Chevrolet
31	Ryan Newman	Richard Childress Racing	Chevrolet
32	Kyle Fowler	Go FAS Racing	Ford
33	Alex Kennedy (R)	Hillman-Circle Sport LLC	Chevrolet
34	Brett Moffitt (R)	Front Row Motorsports	Ford
35	Cole Whitt	Front Row Motorsports	Ford
38	David Gilliland	Front Row Motorsports	Ford
40	Landon Cassill (i)	Hillman-Circle Sport LLC	Chevrolet
41	Kurt Busch (PC5)	Stewart–Haas Racing	Chevrolet
42	Kyle Larson	Chip Ganassi Racing	Chevrolet
43	Aric Almirola	Richard Petty Motorsports	Ford
46	Michael Annett	HScott Motorsports	Chevrolet
47	A. J. Allmendinger	JTG Daugherty Racing	Chevrolet
48	Jimmie Johnson (PC2)	Hendrick Motorsports	Chevrolet
51	Justin Allgaier	HScott Motorsports	Chevrolet
55	David Ragan	Michael Waltrip Racing	Toyota
62	Timmy Hill (i)	Premium Motorsports	Chevrolet
78	Martin Truex Jr.	Furniture Row Racing	Chevrolet
83	Matt DiBenedetto (R)	BK Racing	Toyota
88	Dale Earnhardt Jr.	Hendrick Motorsports	Chevrolet
98	Ryan Preece	Premium Motorsports	Ford
Official initial entry list
Official final entry list

Key	Meaning
(R)	Rookie
(i)	Ineligible for points
(PC#)	Past champions provisional

== Practice ==
=== First practice ===
Joey Logano was the fastest in the first practice session with a time of 19.161 and a speed of 98.826 mph (159.045 km/h).

Pos	No.	Driver	Team	Manufacturer	Time	Speed
1	22	Joey Logano	Team Penske	Ford	19.161	98.826
2	24	Jeff Gordon	Hendrick Motorsports	Chevrolet	19.251	98.364
3	2	Brad Keselowski	Team Penske	Ford	19.256	98.338
Official first practice results

=== Second practice ===
Dale Earnhardt Jr. was the fastest in the second practice session with a time of 19.522 and a speed of 96.998 mph (156.103 km/h). Tony Stewart started from the rear of the field after wrecking his primary car in the session and going to a backup car.

Pos	No.	Driver	Team	Manufacturer	Time	Speed
1	88	Dale Earnhardt Jr.	Hendrick Motorsports	Chevrolet	19.522	96.998
2	78	Martin Truex Jr.	Furniture Row Racing	Chevrolet	19.546	96.879
3	31	Ryan Newman	Richard Childress Racing	Chevrolet	19.547	96.874
Official second practice results

=== Final practice ===
Jimmie Johnson was the fastest in the final practice session with a time of 19.500 and a speed of 97.108 mph (156.280 km/h).

Pos	No.	Driver	Team	Manufacturer	Time	Speed
1	48	Jimmie Johnson	Hendrick Motorsports	Chevrolet	19.500	97.108
2	4	Kevin Harvick	Stewart–Haas Racing	Chevrolet	19.578	96.721
3	2	Brad Keselowski	Team Penske	Ford	19.578	96.721
Official final practice results

== Qualifying ==
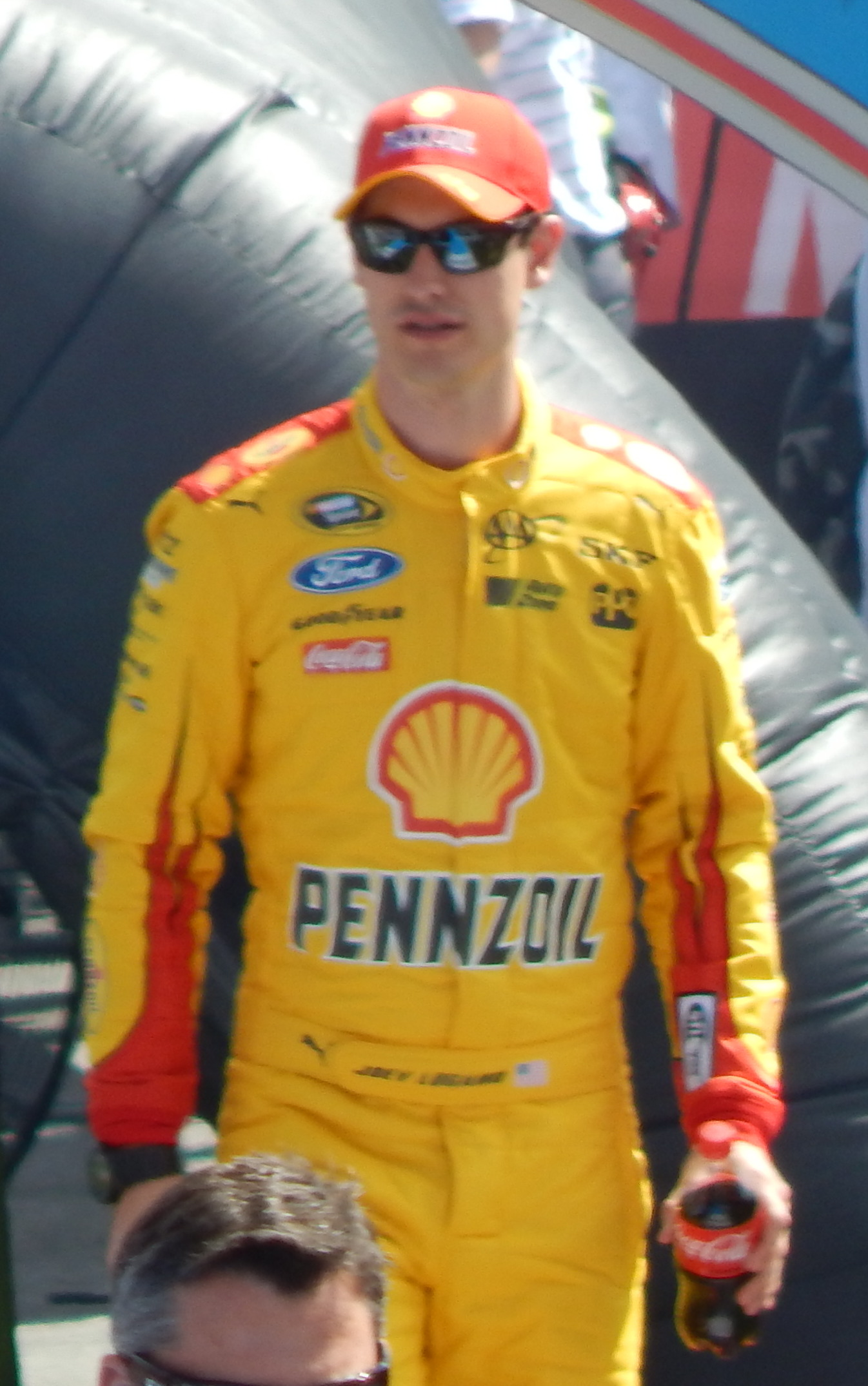
Joey Logano scored the pole for the race.

Joey Logano won the pole with a time of 19.215 and a speed of 98.548 mph (158.598 km/h). He said afterwards that he's amazed at the "run we’re on right now,” Logano said after claiming the pole with a lap of 98.548 mph. “I’m just the lucky guy that gets to drive this thing right now. It’s so much fun and we’re doing everything right. But all that can in a blink of an eye, so we all just have to keep our focus. I don't believe in luck. I believe in hard work, and that's what this team is doing right now." Martin Truex Jr., after qualifying second, said that his team "didn’t know going into qualifying we’d have that good of speed. Definitely a good start to the weekend for us.” After qualifying 14th, Carl Edwards said that he "just wasn’t fast enough the very first run so I put a run on the tires and got us a cycle behind everyone. It’s okay, we’re going to be just fine. I think in my history of qualifying here, this is still about 10–spots better than normal. We have a fast pit crew, the car is a lot better than it was in practice and I think for all these [Xfinity] guys, I think they’re all excited about the race. It’s one of our strong points at JGR and I’m going to have some fun on Sunday.” Kasey Kahne wrecked his car in the first round of qualifying and had to go to a backup car. Because he made a qualifying run, he started from the rear of the field. Speaking on the incident, he said that he "ruined a pretty good car, a really good car, actually. I held it out a little too late, I turned in and kind of broke and lifted off the throttle and got wheel-hopping. I just totally screwed it up myself.”

=== Qualifying results ===
Pos	No.	Driver	Team	Manufacturer	R1	R2	R3
1	22	Joey Logano	Team Penske	Ford	19.299	19.166	19.215
2	78	Martin Truex Jr.	Furniture Row Racing	Chevrolet	19.322	19.241	19.227
3	47	A. J. Allmendinger	JTG Daugherty Racing	Chevrolet	19.301	19.302	19.309
4	1	Jamie McMurray	Chip Ganassi Racing	Chevrolet	19.205	19.253	19.321
5	24	Jeff Gordon	Hendrick Motorsports	Chevrolet	19.321	19.240	19.343
6	18	Kyle Busch	Joe Gibbs Racing	Toyota	19.337	19.329	19.352
7	31	Ryan Newman	Richard Childress Racing	Chevrolet	19.356	19.338	19.377
8	43	Aric Almirola	Richard Petty Motorsports	Ford	19.347	19.337	19.385
9	42	Kyle Larson	Chip Ganassi Racing	Chevrolet	19.351	19.330	19.398
10	11	Denny Hamlin	Joe Gibbs Racing	Toyota	19.380	19.297	19.421
11	2	Brad Keselowski	Team Penske	Ford	19.377	19.340	19.432
12	4	Kevin Harvick	Stewart–Haas Racing	Chevrolet	19.294	19.231	19.452
13	14	Tony Stewart (Note: Tony Stewart started the race from the rear of the field after going to a backup car post-qualifying.)	Stewart–Haas Racing	Chevrolet	19.336	19.344	—
14	19	Carl Edwards	Joe Gibbs Racing	Toyota	19.264	19.355	—
15	41	Kurt Busch	Stewart–Haas Racing	Chevrolet	19.366	19.362	—
16	10	Danica Patrick	Stewart–Haas Racing	Chevrolet	19.350	19.375	—
17	15	Clint Bowyer	Michael Waltrip Racing	Toyota	19.262	19.379	—
18	20	Matt Kenseth	Joe Gibbs Racing	Toyota	19.321	19.434	—
19	13	Casey Mears	Germain Racing	Chevrolet	19.354	19.449	—
20	9	Sam Hornish Jr.	Richard Petty Motorsports	Ford	19.384	19.473	—
21	48	Jimmie Johnson	Hendrick Motorsports	Chevrolet	19.373	19.499	—
22	88	Dale Earnhardt Jr.	Hendrick Motorsports	Chevrolet	19.336	19.505	—
23	51	Justin Allgaier	HScott Motorsports	Chevrolet	19.377	19.562	—
24	5	Kasey Kahne (Note: Kasey Kahne started the race from the rear after going to a backup car post-qualifying.)	Hendrick Motorsports	Chevrolet	19.384	0.000	—
25	16	Greg Biffle	Roush Fenway Racing	Ford	19.395	—	—
26	27	Paul Menard	Richard Childress Racing	Chevrolet	19.403	—	—
27	40	Landon Cassill (i)	Hillman-Circle Sport LLC	Chevrolet	19.436	—	—
28	55	David Ragan	Michael Waltrip Racing	Toyota	19.443	—	—
29	17	Ricky Stenhouse Jr.	Roush Fenway Racing	Ford	19.454	—	—
30	3	Austin Dillon	Richard Childress Racing	Chevrolet	19.506	—	—
31	35	Cole Whitt	Front Row Motorsports	Ford	19.519	—	—
32	6	Trevor Bayne	Roush Fenway Racing	Ford	19.530	—	—
33	38	David Gilliland	Front Row Motorsports	Ford	19.537	—	—
34	34	Brett Moffitt (R)	Front Row Motorsports	Ford	19.576	—	—
35	23	Jeb Burton (R)	BK Racing	Toyota	19.580	—	—
36	83	Matt DiBenedetto (R)	BK Racing	Toyota	19.600	—	—
37	98	Ryan Preece	Premium Motorsports	Ford	19.616	—	—
38	46	Michael Annett	HScott Motorsports	Chevrolet	19.636	—	—
39	26	J. J. Yeley (i)	BK Racing	Toyota	19.649	—	—
40	32	Kyle Fowler	Go FAS Racing	Ford	19.675	—	—
41	7	Alex Bowman	Tommy Baldwin Racing	Chevrolet	19.715	—	—
42	62	Timmy Hill (i)	Premium Motorsports	Chevrolet	19.861	—	—
43	33	Alex Kennedy (R)	Hillman-Circle Sport LLC	Chevrolet	19.899	—	—
Official qualifying results

== Race ==
=== First half ===
==== Start ====
Being on the first Sunday of Standard Time, with a 5:23 pm sunset and no lights at the track, after rain earlier in the day, pit lane was still being dried when the race began under the safety car, counting laps under caution condition at 1:24 p.m. NASCAR decided that they were satisfied with the track's condition and under cloudy Virginia skies, Joey Logano led the field to the green flag on lap 8. Martin Truex Jr. got around Logano exiting turn 4 and took the lead on lap 10. A. J. Allmendinger began pressuring Truex for the lead on lap 20. With the small size of Martinsville, it only took to lap 26 for the leader to catch the end of the field. The lapped traffic allowed Truex to pull away from Allmendinger. He got passed by Logano and Jeff Gordon and fell back to fifth. Logano got under Truex going into turn 1 to retake the lead on lap 37. Gordon drove under Logano in turn 1 to take the lead on lap 45. The second caution of the race flew on lap 51. This was a scheduled competition caution due to overnight rain. Thanks to the first pit stall, Logano exited pit road with the lead. Denny Hamlin was tagged for speeding on pit road and restarted the race from the tail-end of the field.

The race restarted on lap 57. Kurt Busch got under Joey Logano going into turn 1 to take the lead on lap 61. He was unable to pull away from Logano after 20 laps and he eventually lost the lead to him on lap 83. The third caution of the race flew on lap 102 for a single-car spin in turn 1. It appeared that Michael Annett got turned by Matt DiBenedetto. Austin Dillon was tagged for having too many crew members over the wall and restarted the race from the tail-end of the field.

The race restarted on lap 113. It only took a lap for the fourth caution of the race to fly for a multi-car wreck in turn 3. In a classic Martinsville accordion-effect, a number of cars got into each other and spun out. Amongst them were Aric Almirola, Denny Hamlin and Kyle Larson.

The race restarted on lap 120. The fifth caution of the race flew on lap 127 for a single-car wreck in turn 3. Ricky Stenhouse Jr. suffered a right-front tire blowout and slammed the wall. Paul Menard was tagged for an uncontrolled tire and restarted the race from the tail-end of the field. Greg Biffle was tagged for running over his air hose and restarted the race from the tail-end of the field.

==== Second quarter ====
The race restarted on lap 135. The sixth caution of the race flew on lap 136 for a single-car wreck in turn 3. Ryan Preece cut the curb going into the turn, clipped Sam Hornish Jr. and sent him spinning.

The race restarted on lap 142. Danica Patrick got shoved into the turn 3 wall on lap 156 by David Gilliland. She was saved by the seventh caution of the race that flew on lap 157 for a single-car spin on the backstretch. It appeared that Greg Biffle got turned by another car exiting turn 2. Hornish made contact with Biffle as he was unable to avoid him. Austin Dillon opted not to pit and assumed the lead.

The race restarted on lap 162. Dillon was no match for Joey Logano on old tires as the No. 22 passed him in turn 1 to retake the lead on lap 166. The eighth caution of the race flew on lap 172 for a two-car wreck in turn 2. Kyle Busch got loose exiting turn 2 after running his left-front tire over a patch of water hugging the curb, got into Dillon and spun out. Carl Edwards got into the back of A. J. Allmendinger and damaged the front of his car.

The race restarted on lap 180. Race control issued Logano a warning to maintain his speed coming to the restart zone. The ninth caution of the race flew on lap 186 for a single-car wreck in turn 3. David Ragan was trying to pass Kyle Larson going into turn 3 when they made contact, hit Clint Bowyer and sent him backwards into the wall. Bowyer would go on to finish 43rd.

The race restarted on lap 192. Kevin Harvick passed Logano on the outside in turn 3 to take the lead on lap 200. After a series of caution flag periods, the race settled into a green flag run. Harvick ran into lapped traffic after 25 laps in the lead and Logano began reeling him in. He was unable to pass Harvick and lost second–place to teammate Brad Keselowski. Keselowski passed Harvick for the lead just as the 10th caution of the race flew on lap 236 for a single-car spin on the backstretch. Once again, Greg Biffle got loose exiting turn 2 and spun out. Logano exited pit road with the lead.

=== Second half ===
==== Halfway ====
The race restarted on lap 243. Brad Keselowski caught the tail end of his teammate after 10 laps. He eventually got by to take the lead on lap 256. The 11th caution of the race flew on lap 280 for a single-car spin on the backstretch. Exiting turn 2, Greg Biffle got loose and spun out once again. Joey Logano exited pit road with the lead.

The race restarted on lap 287. Keselowski passed his teammate going into turn 3 to retake the lead on lap 294. The 12th caution of the race flew with 122 laps to go for a single-car wreck in turn 3. Kyle Fowler suffered a right-front tire blowout and slammed the wall.

==== Fourth quarter ====
“I got wrecked,” Logano said. “I don’t know. What am I supposed to say about it? His race was over and he tried so hard to catch us the first time and he took out half the field, and he was successful the second time so I give that to him. It’s kind of a coward move. Actually, a really coward move for a race car driver to do that, essentially someone as mature and an experienced race car driver that knows what this is all about. I think what happened at Kansas is a completely different deal. We were racing for the win and he blocks you a few times and then we raced hard and he blocked me the last time and we spun out. That’s what happened there. Here it was just a complete coward move, especially for a championship racecar driver and race team. Just a complete coward. I don’t have anything else to say. It’s a chicken-you-know-what move to completely take out the leader when your race is over. We’ll move on.”

— Joey Logano speaking on being taken out by Matt Kenseth with 47 laps to go.

The race restarted with 113 laps to go. Joey Logano drove by his teammate to retake the lead with 111 laps to go. Keselowski drove by his teammate going into turn 1 to retake the lead with 105 laps to go. Logano took back the lead with 89 laps to go. In under a lap, Keselowski fell back to third. The 13th caution of the race flew with 83 laps to go for a single-car spin in turn 4. Danica Patrick was trying to wreck David Gilliland when she spun herself out in turn 4. She said after the race that Gilliland "unnecessarily, I thought, took me out at the beginning of the race. So I was just repaying the favor.’’ Denny Hamlin was tagged for speeding on pit road and restarted the race from the tail-end of the field.

The race restarted with 75 laps to go. The 14th caution of the race flew for a single-car spin in turn 3. Sam Hornish Jr. tried to go underneath Jeb Burton, clipped him and sent him spinning.

The race restarted with 66 laps to go. The 15th caution of the race flew for a multi-car wreck on the backstretch. Exiting turn 2, Keselowski spun out Matt Kenseth, sent him into a t-bone collision with Kurt Busch and the No. 41 car slammed the inside wall. Keselowski said that he "got hit from behind and it pushed me into the 20 (Kenseth). The right-front wheel hit Kenseth's left-rear and it just broke the right-front suspension off the car. Car wouldn't turn and just kept going straight until I couldn't do nothing and just started wrecking everybody. Didn't have any steering wheel left." Busch said that he "just got caught up and we were a victim. We were somebody else's collateral damage. It's a product of how everybody has to race in this Chase. For us there is so much more to our story. It's been a fantastic season. ... We led laps today. We were up front. Restarting third with a set of fresh tires and 70 laps to go, I mean we were in perfect position. We did our job, we just didn't have luck on our side."

The race restarted with 57 laps to go. The 16th caution of the race flew with 47 laps to go for a two-car wreck in turn 1. Matt Kenseth, not happy with the incident a few weeks earlier and on the preceding caution, took out race leader Joey Logano, gaining a standing ovation from spectators. After being released from the infield care center, Logano said that Kenseth made "a complete coward move". When asked about Logano's remark Kenseth said that he didn't "have any comment for that. Some days you're the bat, some days you're the ball. It's never fun when you're the ball." This brought out the red flag to clean up the mess. With Logano being taken out, the lead went to Jeff Gordon. The red flag was lifted and the field continued with 45 laps remaining and little remaining daylight. Kyle Larson was tagged for speeding on pit road and restarted the race from the tail-end of the field. Hamlin opted not to pit and assumed the lead.

The race restarted with 41 laps to go. A. J. Allmendinger took the lead from Hamlin with 39 laps to go. The 17th caution of the race flew with 34 laps to go, when Austin Dillon clipped David Ragan and sent him spinning in turn 2.

The race restarted with 30 laps to go. Jeff Gordon passed Allmendinger for the lead in turn 1 with 21 laps to go. The 18th caution of the race flew with seven laps to go for a spin by Sam Hornish Jr. After the race restarted with two laps to go, Gordon held off Jamie McMurray to score his 93rd career victory, just seconds from official sunset. While the drivers were not informed of such at the time, as the track did not have lights, the lap 499 restart was not an official green–white–checker finish. Had there been another incident before Gordon crossed the start–finish line to start lap 500, the checkered flag would have waved because of darkness without an attempt to finish the race under green flag conditions, as a lack of daylight would have ended the race at regulation.

== Post-race ==
=== Driver comments ===
Gordon joked in victory lane that he wasn't going to retire after this season, saying “[t]his is the sweetest, most amazing feeling. I am so proud of this team. You want to talk about holding back emotions; right now man, wow, we’re going to Homestead! I can’t believe it. What an incredible battle that was.” He also added that he thought "the thing that's probably been more of an impact on me is just when we haven't performed the way that we want to, the way that I feel like we should, you just feel like you're disappointing people. That's tough. That weighs on you," he said. "You sit there, I don't even know how to describe it, but you just constantly have that over you. Not pressure as much as I don't know how to describe it. ... It's like your father when you're a kid. You want to please him, do everything you can to make everybody happy. We weren't doing a great job of it. Hopefully, everybody's a little bit happier now and we can give everybody something to cheer about at Homestead." Gordon eventually made eight starts in 2016, with the October 2016 Martinsville Speedway being his last in NASCAR's premiership, and a sports car racing start in 2017, winning the 24 Hours of Daytona.

Following a runner-up finish, McMurray said of the final restart that he was somewhat glad that "Jeff gave me the outside...I struggled on the inside. Knowing it was just going to be a green-white-checkered, I thought I might be able to get around him." He then added that he "drove as hard as I could. Jeff was on the outside. His car stuck a little bit better than mine. I was hoping I could just get close enough to him down the backstretch that I could make some more drama for today versus what we already had. I spun the tires really bad off turn two and wasn’t able to get to his back.”

After a third–place finish, Hamlin said that his day "was eventful to say the least – two pit road penalties, my car wasn’t very good at all up until the very, very end and we just took a long time to get going. It’s just part of it. This racing now is different now than what it used to be when I first came in the sport and it's just survival of the fittest.”

=== Media comments ===
“Matt Kenseth, who felt he was wronged by Joey Logano at Kansas Speedway two weeks ago, paid off what he had promised earlier in the weekend when he purposely crashed into the Team Penske driver. It was a pretty blatant retaliation that Kenseth tried to cover up by saying a tire went down to cause his contact with Logano. Not surprisingly many believe what Kenseth did was perfectly acceptable while others saw it as crossing the line...and then some. The time has come for NASCAR to step in and stop the madness. All Sunday’s incident did was take the focus away from what was a pretty interesting race and its championship implications and reinforce the “wrecking is racing” stereotype the sport does not deserve.”

— Motor Racing Network lead writer Pete Pistone giving his take on the incident with Kenseth and Logano.

Members of the NASCAR media gave their take on what happened with Matt Kenseth and Joey Logano. Pete Pistone of the Motor Racing Network said that for some reason, "it’s now become a tolerable practice to not worry about winning anything fair and square, but rather plot the best way to screw your competitor from succeeding" and that "[s]portsmanship has joined the Dodo bird on the extinction list."

Jeff Gluck of USA Today said that "Kenseth should be suspended for next week’s race at Texas Motor Speedway — even though that won’t help salvage Logano’s title hopes" and that the sport "needs to decide what it wants to be. Is it a form of competition that provides an even playing field in order to determine wins and championships? Or is it a glorified county fair demolition derby which emphasizes entertainment over integrity?"

Larry McReynolds of Fox Sports said that "if NASCAR doesn't drop the hammer on Matt Kenseth[,] well shame on them" and that "if I hear the word probation, I'm going to find the nearest trash can and throw up. Probation means nothing in our sport. It's a hollow word used in our sport."

Drew Davison of the Fort Worth Star-Telegram said that the sport "finds itself in a predicament" in which "it is also flirting with being more in line with professional wrestling than an actual sport".

Tom Jensen of said that while "drama and the tension of the Chase are wonderful to watch most of the time...there has to be a limit, especially when using a 3,250-pound race car as a weapon. This has to stop and it has to stop now."

Jenna Fryer of the Associated Press said that the incident is "NASCAR's version of the 'wild West'" and while "[p]ayback has always been accepted...[i]t's time for France (NASCAR's chairman and CEO) to decide if that is 'quintessential NASCAR' or not."

Gerry Fraley of The Dallas Morning News said that "NASCAR let this situation grow" with Brian France calling Logano's actions at Kansas "quintessential NASCAR" and that the situation that "happening is straight out of World Wrestling Entertainment. Get away with anything you can while the referee looks the other way."

Thomas Pope of The Fayetteville Observer said that while he doesn't condone the actions of Kenseth, "NASCAR is as much at fault for what happened as Kenseth or Logano. They let the foundation for this kind of thing be built by not blackflagging an overly aggressive Logano, who could’ve gotten somebody killed, at Kansas. Kenseth was fed up with being pushed around, and Sunday, he pushed back."

Dave Moody of Sirius XM NASCAR Radio said of Denny Hamlin's take on the incident that while Hamlin "is entitled to his opinion...[am I] the only one who’s tired of hearing drivers say, 'NASCAR should protect us from ourselves?' Brian France and Mike Helton don’t drive race cars. Drivers do. These are grown men (and women) who can handle their own affairs, both on and off the race track. They do not need an 'authority figure' to teach them right from wrong."

Ryan McGee of ESPN.com took a different approach by saying NASCAR fans "can't watch Matt Kenseth pile-drive Joey Logano so hard that they damn near knock down the Turn 1 wall and then cry outrage and spew righteous anger and question the sanity and humanity and unsportsmanlike conduct of it all. Not at the end of the same week when we all wondered giddily aloud if that exact scenario might take place."

=== NASCAR CEO speaks on incident ===
“The reality is that in Kansas, what I said on this show was that late in a race we expect drivers to take chances to win races, they’ve got the skill to do it. We expect them to race hard. Blocking is part of this game, as Matt was doing, and contact will happen in NASCAR from time to time. That’s really all that was, but the unfortunate thing for Matt is that he had a lot of on the line that day and it’s understandable the disappointment he had. Late in that race, a faster car is behind you and you’re blocking, there’s some contact and you get the short end of it and you go around. That was an entirely different situation than Martinsville. What we’re not going to do is to take the style of NASCAR and parlay that into something where one driver or another believes the way to pay back somebody for something that happened is to take matters into their own hands. Obviously, we won’t be accepting that. The most important thing is the way to pay drivers back is to race them hard. When someone races you hard, you race them hard. If they’re going to give you no inches late in the race, then that’s how you’re going to race them. That’s NASCAR. What happened on Sunday, that’s not quite the way we would have liked to have seen that turn out.”

— NASCAR Chairman and CEO Brian France talking to Sirius XM NASCAR Radio on the incident involving Matt Kenseth and Joey Logano.

Speaking to Mike Bagley and Pete Pistone on the Sirius XM NASCAR Radio program The Morning Drive, NASCAR Chairman and CEO Brian France said that Matt Kenseth went too far in taking out Joey Logano.

He added that the sanctioning body doesn't "want that to happen again. We don’t want any of our events to be altered in a way they shouldn’t be. What we want to prevent happening is drivers or any participant in NASCAR to take matters into their own hands and begin to control the outcome of races beyond hard racing. When that happens, that’s a very serious thing for us. And we’ll be dealing with that.”

He continued by saying what happened at Kansas "was an entirely different situation. What we’re not going to do is take the style of NASCAR and parlay that into something where one driver believes the way to pay back somebody for something that happened is take matters into their own hands. Obviously, we won’t be accepting that."

He then said that hard racing is "[t]he way to pay drivers back...That’s NASCAR. But what happened on Sunday is not quite the way we’d like things to turn out.”

He concluded by saying while he sympathized with Kenseth being disappointed after Kansas, there are limits to "Boys, have at it" and every driver knows "those limits. They know. They understand what’s hard racing, taking chances, a little bit of contact – and they realize when they do something that’s way over the line. They may not say it, but they understand it – and we certainly do.”

=== Post-race penalties ===
On the Tuesday after the race, NASCAR suspended Matt Kenseth for two races for his role in the incident that took out Joey Logano. According to NASCAR Executive Vice-president and Chief Racing Development Officer Steve O'Donnell, Kenseth "eliminated the No. 22 car’s opportunity to continue to compete in the race. Additionally, we factored aspects of safety into our decision, and also the fact that the new Chase elimination format puts a premium on each and every race. These actions have no place in NASCAR.” Shortly after the announcement, Joe Gibbs Racing announced that they would appeal the decision and "challenge the severity of the penalty which is believed to be inconsistent with previous penalties for similar on-track incidents. There will be no further comments from JGR personnel during the appeal process."

Additionally, Danica Patrick was fined $50,000, docked 25–points and put on NASCAR probation through December 31. NASCAR had no comment on the penalty handed to the driver of the No. 10 car. However, it was assumed that Patrick's fine was for her radio conversations and repeated incidents with David Gilliland during the race after Gilliland spun Patrick the first time, she went "headhunting" for Gilliland, and initiated contact with him twice to cause separate safety car periods.

==== Appeal ====
On the Thursday after the race, the National Motorsports Appeals Panel upheld Matt Kenseth's two race suspension. After hearing the testimony from Joe Gibbs Racing and NASCAR, the panel decided that Kenseth "violated the rules set forth in the penalty notice" and upheld the original penalty levied by NASCAR. JGR decided to make the final appeal to the National Motorsports Final Appeals Officer Brian Moss.

==== Final appeal ====
Later that day, National Motorsports Final Appeals Officer Bryan Moss upheld the two race suspension, but amended the probation penalty to conclude on December 31 instead of in six months. Not surprisingly, Kenseth was "more than a little disappointed on the decision and the penalties to start with...I’m the first driver in the 65-year history of NASCAR to get suspended for an incident that happened in a Sprint Cup Series race. I feel like I was unfairly made the example. I’m extremely disappointed, but we’ll get through this, and I look forward to going to Homestead. I’m not going to change who I am. I’m not going to change what I stand for. I’m not going to change how I race. I’ve been in this business a long time, and I feel like I’ve had a pretty good career to this point and I feel like I’m going to continue to have the respect on the racetrack that I feel like I deserve.” Team owner Joe Gibbs said that their motive "for appealing is we felt like the penalty was kind of unprecedented and it was inconsistent with a number of other on-track incidents". Erik Jones drove in place of Kenseth at Texas and Phoenix.

== Race results ==
Pos	No.	Driver	Team	Manufacturer	Laps	Points
1	24	Jeff Gordon	Hendrick Motorsports	Chevrolet	500	47
2	1	Jamie McMurray	Chip Ganassi Racing	Chevrolet	500	42
3	11	Denny Hamlin	Joe Gibbs Racing	Toyota	500	42
4	88	Dale Earnhardt Jr.	Hendrick Motorsports	Chevrolet	500	40
5	18	Kyle Busch	Joe Gibbs Racing	Toyota	500	39
6	78	Martin Truex Jr.	Furniture Row Racing	Chevrolet	500	39
7	31	Ryan Newman	Richard Childress Racing	Chevrolet	500	37
8	4	Kevin Harvick	Stewart–Haas Racing	Chevrolet	500	37
9	5	Kasey Kahne	Hendrick Motorsports	Chevrolet	500	35
10	14	Tony Stewart	Stewart–Haas Racing	Chevrolet	500	34
11	47	A. J. Allmendinger	JTG Daugherty Racing	Chevrolet	500	34
12	48	Jimmie Johnson	Hendrick Motorsports	Chevrolet	500	32
13	51	Justin Allgaier	HScott Motorsports	Chevrolet	500	31
14	19	Carl Edwards	Joe Gibbs Racing	Toyota	500	30
15	27	Paul Menard	Richard Childress Racing	Chevrolet	500	29
16	43	Aric Almirola	Richard Petty Motorsports	Ford	500	28
17	13	Casey Mears	Germain Racing	Chevrolet	500	27
18	3	Austin Dillon	Richard Childress Racing	Chevrolet	500	27
19	42	Kyle Larson	Chip Ganassi Racing	Chevrolet	500	25
20	35	Cole Whitt	Front Row Motorsports	Ford	500	24
21	40	Landon Cassill (i)	Hillman-Circle Sport LLC	Chevrolet	500	0
22	7	Alex Bowman	Tommy Baldwin Racing	Chevrolet	499	22
23	46	Michael Annett	HScott Motorsports	Chevrolet	498	21
24	38	David Gilliland	Front Row Motorsports	Ford	498	20
25	55	David Ragan	Michael Waltrip Racing	Toyota	498	19
26	16	Greg Biffle	Roush Fenway Racing	Ford	497	18
27	23	Jeb Burton (R)	BK Racing	Toyota	496	17
28	9	Sam Hornish Jr.	Richard Petty Motorsports	Ford	493	16
29	26	J. J. Yeley (i)	BK Racing	Toyota	492	0
30	83	Matt DiBenedetto (R)	BK Racing	Toyota	492	14
31	6	Trevor Bayne	Roush Fenway Racing	Ford	491	13
32	2	Brad Keselowski	Team Penske	Ford	490	13
33	33	Alex Kennedy (R)	Hillman-Circle Sport LLC	Chevrolet	489	11
34	41	Kurt Busch	Stewart–Haas Racing	Chevrolet	486	11
35	34	Brett Moffitt (R)	Front Row Motorsports	Ford	479	9
36	62	Timmy Hill (i)	Premium Motorsports	Chevrolet	459	0
37	22	Joey Logano	Team Penske	Ford	458	9
38	20	Matt Kenseth	Joe Gibbs Racing	Toyota	443	6
39	17	Ricky Stenhouse Jr.	Roush Fenway Racing	Ford	423	5
40	10	Danica Patrick	Stewart–Haas Racing	Chevrolet	391	–21 (Note: Danica Patrick was handed a 25–point penalty for attempting to take out David Gilliland.)
41	32	Kyle Fowler	Go FAS Racing	Ford	373	3
42	98	Ryan Preece	Premium Motorsports	Ford	365	2
43	15	Clint Bowyer	Michael Waltrip Racing	Toyota	185	1
Official Goody's Headache Relief Shot 500 results

=== Race statistics ===
- 21 lead changes among 9 different drivers
- 18 cautions for 109 laps; 1 red flag for 12:46
- Time of race: 3 hours, 46 minutes, 35 seconds
- Average speed: 69.643 mph (112.080 km/h)
- Jeff Gordon took home $199,836 in winnings

Lap Leaders
Laps	Leader
1-8	Joey Logano
9-35	Martin Truex Jr.
36-43	Joey Logano
44-53	Jeff Gordon
54-59	Joey Logano
60-81	Kurt Busch
82-158	Joey Logano
159-164	Austin Dillon
165-198	Joey Logano
199-236	Kevin Harvick
237-239	Brad Keselowski
240-255	Joey Logano
256-282	Brad Keselowski
283-292	Joey Logano
293-388	Brad Keselowski
389-393	Joey Logano
394-410	Brad Keselowski
411-453	Joey Logano
454-456	Jeff Gordon
457-459	Denny Hamlin
460-478	A. J. Allmendinger
479-500	Jeff Gordon

Total laps led
Leader	Laps
Joey Logano	207
Brad Keselowski	143
Kevin Harvick	38
Jeff Gordon	35
Martin Truex Jr.	27
Kurt Busch	22
A. J. Allmendinger	19
Austin Dillon	6
Denny Hamlin	3

==== Race awards ====
- Coors Light Pole Award: Joey Logano (19.215, 98.548 mph (158.598 km/h)
- 3M Lap Leader: Joey Logano (207 laps)
- American Ethanol Green Flag Restart Award: Jeff Gordon
- Duralast Brakes "Bake In The Race" Award: Joey Logano
- Freescale "Wide Open": Jamie McMurray
- Ingersoll Rand Power Move: A. J. Allmendinger (6 positions)
- MAHLE Clevite Engine Builder of the Race: Hendrick Engines, #24
- Mobil 1 Driver of the Race: Jeff Gordon (128.6 driver rating)
- Moog Steering and Suspension Problem Solver of The Race: Denny Hamlin (crew chief Dave Rogers (0.151 seconds))
- NASCAR Sprint Cup Leader Bonus: Jeff Gordon, ($10,000)
- Sherwin-Williams Fastest Lap: A. J. Allmendinger (Lap 14, 19.860, 95.347 mph (153.446 km/h))
- Sunoco Rookie of The Race: Jeb Burton

== Media ==
=== Television ===
NBCSN covered the race on the television side. Rick Allen, 1997 race winner Jeff Burton and Steve Letarte had the call in the booth for the race. Dave Burns, Mike Massaro, Marty Snider and Kelli Stavast handled pit road on the television side.

NBCSN
Booth announcers	Pit reporters
Lap-by-lap: Rick Allen; Color-commentator: Jeff Burton; Color-commentator: Steve Letarte	Dave Burns; Mike Massaro; Marty Snider; Kelli Stavast

=== Radio ===
MRN had the radio call for the race, which was simulcast on Sirius XM NASCAR Radio. Joe Moore and Jeff Striegle called the race from the booth when the field was racing down the frontstretch. Dave Moody called the race from the turn 3 stand when the field was racing down the backstretch. Alex Hayden, Winston Kelley and Steve Post handled pit road on the radio side.

MRN
Booth announcers	Turn announcers	Pit reporters
Lead announcer: Joe Moore; Announcer: Jeff Striegle	Backstretch: Dave Moody	Alex Hayden; Winston Kelley; Steve Post

== Standings after the race ==
Drivers' Championship standings

	Pos	Driver	Points
2	1	Jeff Gordon	4,047 - Advanced
6	2	Kyle Busch	4,039 (–8)
3	3	Martin Truex Jr.	4,039 (–8)
3	4	Kevin Harvick	4,037 (–10)
3	5	Carl Edwards	4,030 (–17)
1	6	Brad Keselowski	4,013 (–34)
3	7	Kurt Busch	4,011 (–36)
7	8	Joey Logano	4,009 (–38)

'Race for Fifth'

NOTE: Drivers eliminated after each cut will have their score reset to the base score of 2,000 points and three points for every win in the regular season, and the points they score in each race will count towards final standings. The four drivers eliminated after Phoenix will have their Chase points from the nine races added to the base score at the start of the Chase for the race to fifth.

	Pos	Driver	Points
	9	Denny Hamlin	2,251 (–1,796)
	10	Ryan Newman	2,231 (–1,816)
1	11	Dale Earnhardt Jr.	2,221 (–1,826)
2	12	Jamie McMurray	2,201 (–1,846)
2	13	Matt Kenseth	2,197 (–1,850)
1	14	Jimmie Johnson	2,193 (–1,854)
	15	Paul Menard	2,177 (–1,870)
	16	Clint Bowyer	2,124 (–1,923)

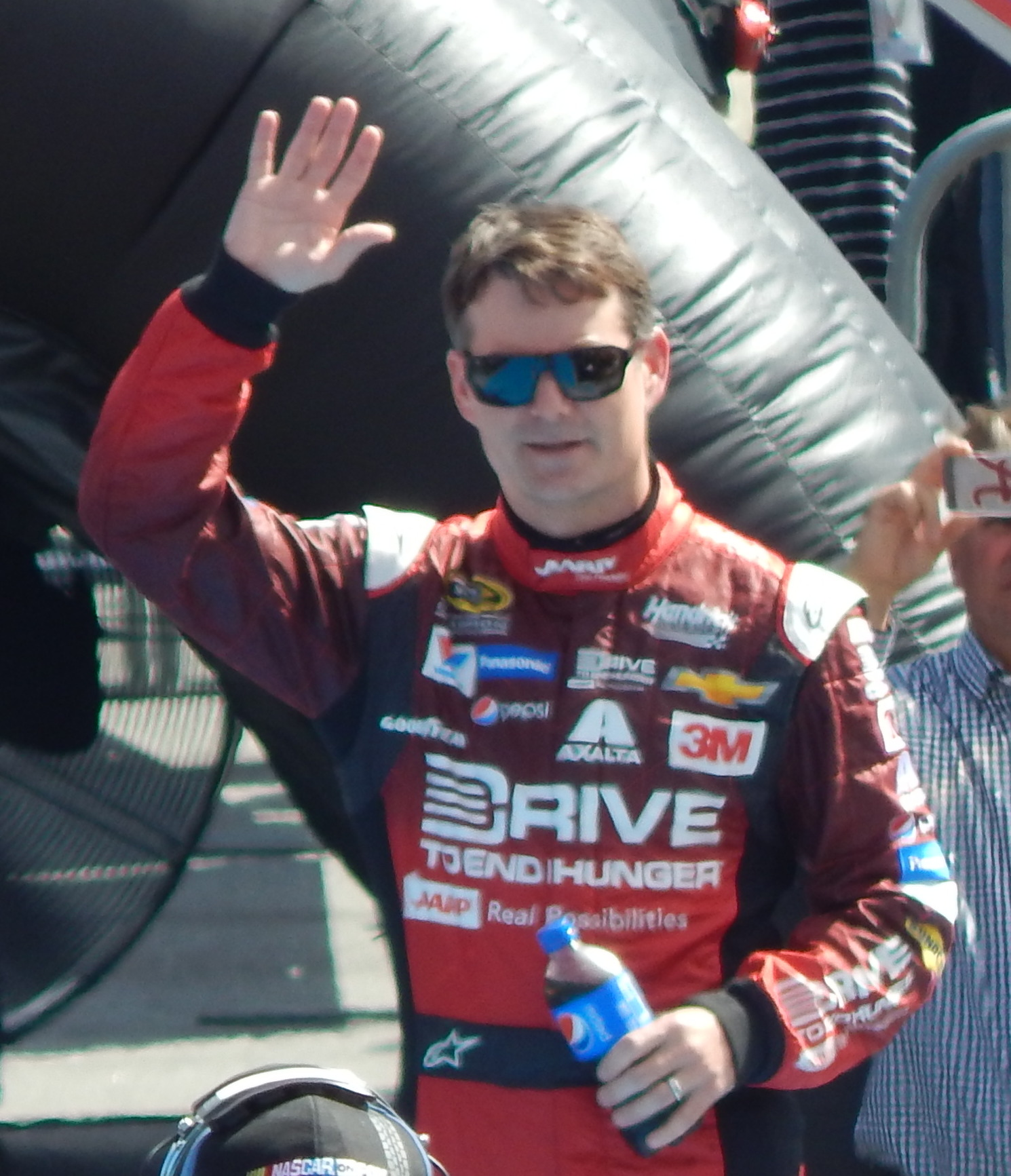
Jeff Gordon left Martinsville with an eight–point lead over Kyle Busch and Martin Truex Jr.

Manufacturers' Championship standings

Pos	Manufacturer	Points
1	Chevrolet	1,448
2	Toyota	1,391 (–57)
3	Ford	1,370 (–78)

- Note: Only the first sixteen positions are included for the driver standings.

== Notes ==
Previous race: 2015 CampingWorld.com 500 at Talladega	Sprint Cup Series; 2015 season	Next race: 2015 AAA Texas 500
