= 2015 AAA Texas 500 =

Race details
- Race 34 of 36 in the 2015 NASCAR Sprint Cup Series
- Date: November 8, 2015
- Location: Texas Motor Speedway in Fort Worth, Texas
- Course: Permanent racing facility
- Course length: 1.5 miles (2.4 km)
- Distance: 334 laps, 501 mi (801.6 km)
- Weather: Clear blue skies with a temperature of 64 °F (18 °C); wind out of the northeast at 8 mph (13 km/h)
- Average speed: 137.490 mph (221.269 km/h)

Pole position
Driver	Brad Keselowski	Team Penske
- Time: 27.421

Most laps led
Driver	Brad Keselowski	Team Penske
- Laps: 312

Winner
No. 48	Jimmie Johnson	Hendrick Motorsports

Television in the United States
- Network: NBC
- Announcers: Rick Allen, Jeff Burton and Steve Letarte
- Nielsen ratings: 2.6/5 (Overnight); 2.7/6 (Final); 4.6 Million viewers

Radio in the United States
- Radio: PRN
- Booth announcers: Doug Rice, Mark Garrow and Wendy Venturini
- Turn announcers: Rob Albright (1 & 2) and Pat Patterson (3 & 4)

The 2015 AAA Texas 500 was a NASCAR Sprint Cup Series race held on November 8, 2015, at Texas Motor Speedway in Fort Worth, Texas. Contested over 334 laps on the 1.5 mile (2.4 km) intermediate quad-oval, it was the 34th race of the 2015 NASCAR Sprint Cup Series season, eighth race of the Chase and second race of the Eliminator Round. Jimmie Johnson won the race, his fifth of the season. Brad Keselowski finished second. Kevin Harvick, Kyle Busch and Carl Edwards rounded out the top-five.

Keselowski won the pole for the race and led a race high of 312 laps on his way to a runner-up finish. The race had 15 lead changes among eight different drivers, as well as nine caution flag periods for 47 laps.

This was the 75th career victory for Johnson, fifth of the season, sixth at Texas Motor Speedway and eighth at the track for Hendrick Motorsports. The win moved him up to 12th in the points standings. Chevrolet left Texas with a 63–point lead over Toyota in the manufacturer standings.

The AAA Texas 500 was carried by NBC Sports on the broadcast NBC network for the American television audience. The radio broadcast for the race was carried by the Performance Racing Network and Sirius XM NASCAR Radio.

== Report ==
=== Background ===
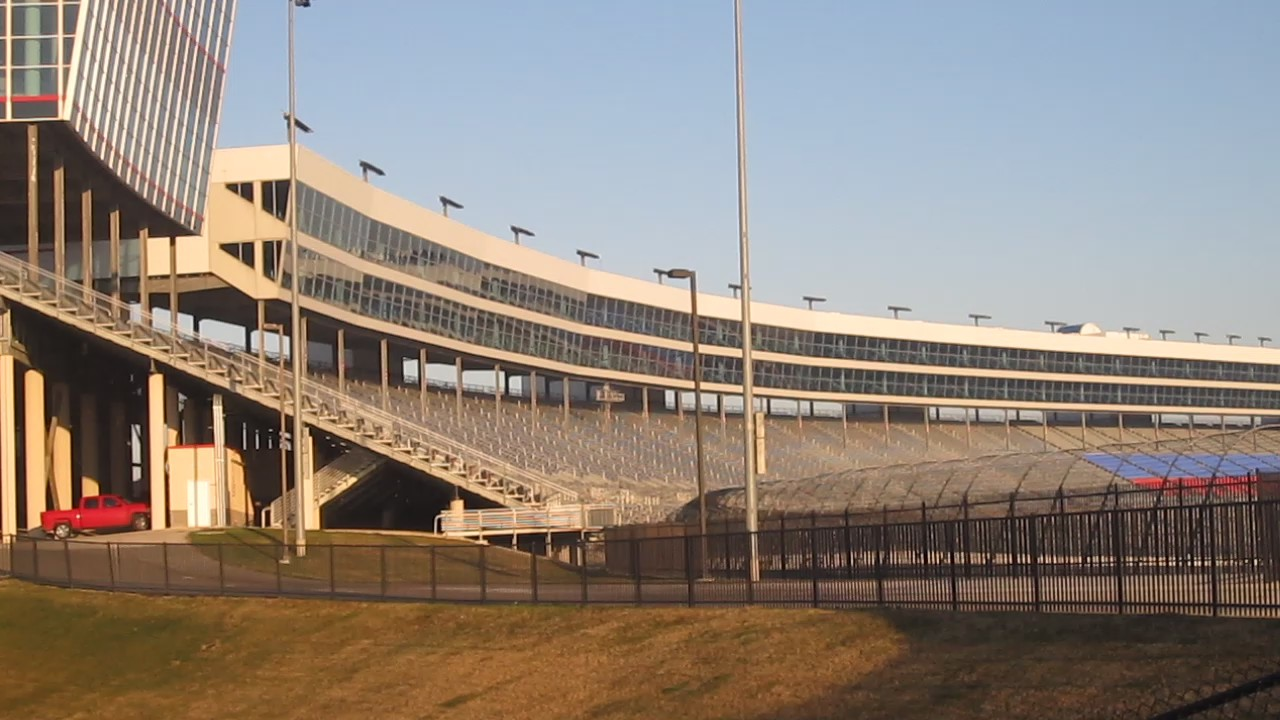
Texas Motor Speedway, the track where the race was held.

Texas Motor Speedway (formerly known as Texas International Raceway from September to December 1996) is a 1.500 mi (2.414 km) quad-oval intermediate speedway in Fort Worth, Texas. Jeff Gordon entered with an eight–point over Kyle Busch and Martin Truex Jr. Kevin Harvick entered fourth 10–points back. Carl Edwards entered fifth 17–points back. Brad Keselowski entered sixth 34–points back. Kurt Busch entered seventh 36–points back. Joey Logano entered eighth 38–points back.

==== Driver suspension ====
On the Tuesday after the 2015 Goody's Headache Relief Shot 500, NASCAR suspended Matt Kenseth for two races for his role in the incident that took out Joey Logano. According to NASCAR Executive Vice-President and Chief Racing Development Officer Steve O'Donnell, Kenseth "eliminated the No. 22 car’s opportunity to continue to compete in the race. Additionally, we factored aspects of safety into our decision, and also the fact that the new Chase elimination format puts a premium on each and every race. These actions have no place in NASCAR.” Shortly after the announcement, Joe Gibbs Racing announced that they would appeal the decision and "challenge the severity of the penalty which is believed to be inconsistent with previous penalties for similar on-track incidents. There will be no further comments from JGR personnel during the appeal process."

On the Thursday before this weekend's race, the National Motorsports Appeals Panel upheld the original penalty levied by NASCAR. Later that day, National Motorsports Final Appeals Officer Bryan Moss upheld the two race suspension, but amended the probation penalty to conclude on December 31 instead of in six months.

Erik Jones drove in place of Kenseth this weekend. He said that being "part of that next wave that people think [of] is pretty cool and a pretty big honor. I never thought I’d be in that position. A few years ago, I kind of wondered where is my opportunity going to come from, where is my spot going to be in the sport? But everything works out at the end of the day, and it’s working out more and more every day.”

This marked the first race since the 1999 NAPA 500 that Kenseth didn’t compete in, snapping a 571 race starting streak.

==== Hauler fire ====
On the Thursday before the race, the hauler carrying the primary and backup cars for HScott Motorsports's Michael Annett caught fire on Interstate 20 west of Longview, Texas. A team spokesperson said nobody was injured and the team sent a spare hauler from their shop in Spartanburg, South Carolina. However, it was unable to make it to the track prior to the garage opening at 8:00 a.m. Eastern time Friday, so Annett used the backup car of teammate Justin Allgaier to race this weekend. The spare cars served as both drivers' backups.

==== Entry list ====
The entry list for the AAA Texas 500 was released on Monday, November 2 at 12:21 p.m. Eastern time. Forty-five cars were entered for the race. All but Ryan Blaney and Michael McDowell were entered in the previous week's race at Martinsville. Joey Gase returned to the seat of the No. 32 Go FAS Racing Ford. Brian Scott returned to the seat of the No. 33 Hillman-Circle Sport LLC Chevrolet. Reed Sorenson drove the No. 62 Premium Motorsports Chevrolet. With Kenseth being parked by NASCAR, Erik Jones made his second career Sprint Cup Series start in the No. 20 Toyota.

No.	Driver	Team	Manufacturer
1	Jamie McMurray	Chip Ganassi Racing	Chevrolet
2	Brad Keselowski (PC3)	Team Penske	Ford
3	Austin Dillon	Richard Childress Racing	Chevrolet
4	Kevin Harvick (PC1)	Stewart–Haas Racing	Chevrolet
5	Kasey Kahne	Hendrick Motorsports	Chevrolet
6	Trevor Bayne	Roush Fenway Racing	Ford
7	Alex Bowman	Tommy Baldwin Racing	Chevrolet
9	Sam Hornish Jr.	Richard Petty Motorsports	Ford
10	Danica Patrick	Stewart–Haas Racing	Chevrolet
11	Denny Hamlin	Joe Gibbs Racing	Toyota
13	Casey Mears	Germain Racing	Chevrolet
14	Tony Stewart (PC4)	Stewart–Haas Racing	Chevrolet
15	Clint Bowyer	Michael Waltrip Racing	Toyota
16	Greg Biffle	Roush Fenway Racing	Ford
17	Ricky Stenhouse Jr.	Roush Fenway Racing	Ford
18	Kyle Busch	Joe Gibbs Racing	Toyota
19	Carl Edwards	Joe Gibbs Racing	Toyota
20	Erik Jones (i)	Joe Gibbs Racing	Toyota
21	Ryan Blaney (i)	Wood Brothers Racing	Ford
22	Joey Logano	Team Penske	Ford
23	Jeb Burton (R)	BK Racing	Toyota
24	Jeff Gordon (PC6)	Hendrick Motorsports	Chevrolet
26	J. J. Yeley (i)	BK Racing	Toyota
27	Paul Menard	Richard Childress Racing	Chevrolet
31	Ryan Newman	Richard Childress Racing	Chevrolet
32	Joey Gase (i)	Go FAS Racing	Ford
33	Brian Scott (i)	Hillman-Circle Sport LLC	Chevrolet
34	Brett Moffitt (R)	Front Row Motorsports	Ford
35	Cole Whitt	Front Row Motorsports	Ford
38	David Gilliland	Front Row Motorsports	Ford
40	Landon Cassill (i)	Hillman-Circle Sport LLC	Chevrolet
41	Kurt Busch (PC5)	Stewart–Haas Racing	Chevrolet
42	Kyle Larson	Chip Ganassi Racing	Chevrolet
43	Aric Almirola	Richard Petty Motorsports	Ford
46	Michael Annett	HScott Motorsports	Chevrolet
47	A. J. Allmendinger	JTG Daugherty Racing	Chevrolet
48	Jimmie Johnson (PC2)	Hendrick Motorsports	Chevrolet
51	Justin Allgaier	HScott Motorsports	Chevrolet
55	David Ragan	Michael Waltrip Racing	Toyota
62	Reed Sorenson	Premium Motorsports	Chevrolet
78	Martin Truex Jr.	Furniture Row Racing	Chevrolet
83	Matt DiBenedetto (R)	BK Racing	Toyota
88	Dale Earnhardt Jr.	Hendrick Motorsports	Chevrolet
95	Michael McDowell	Leavine Family Racing	Ford
98	Ryan Preece	Premium Motorsports	Ford
Official initial entry list
Official final entry list

Key	Meaning
(R)	Rookie
(i)	Ineligible for points
(PC#)	Past champions provisional

== Practice ==
Brad Keselowski was the fastest in the first and only practice session with a time of 27.403 and a speed of 197.059 mph (317.136 km/h). The other two practice sessions scheduled on Saturday were cancelled because NASCAR had difficulties drying the track due to a combination of overnight rain, high humidity and weepers (water seeping out of the surface of the track which happens largely at tracks with older asphalt surfaces).

Pos	No.	Driver	Team	Manufacturer	Time	Speed
1	2	Brad Keselowski	Team Penske	Ford	27.403	197.059
2	4	Kevin Harvick	Stewart–Haas Racing	Chevrolet	27.492	196.421
3	19	Carl Edwards	Joe Gibbs Racing	Toyota	27.516	196.249
Official first practice results

== Qualifying ==
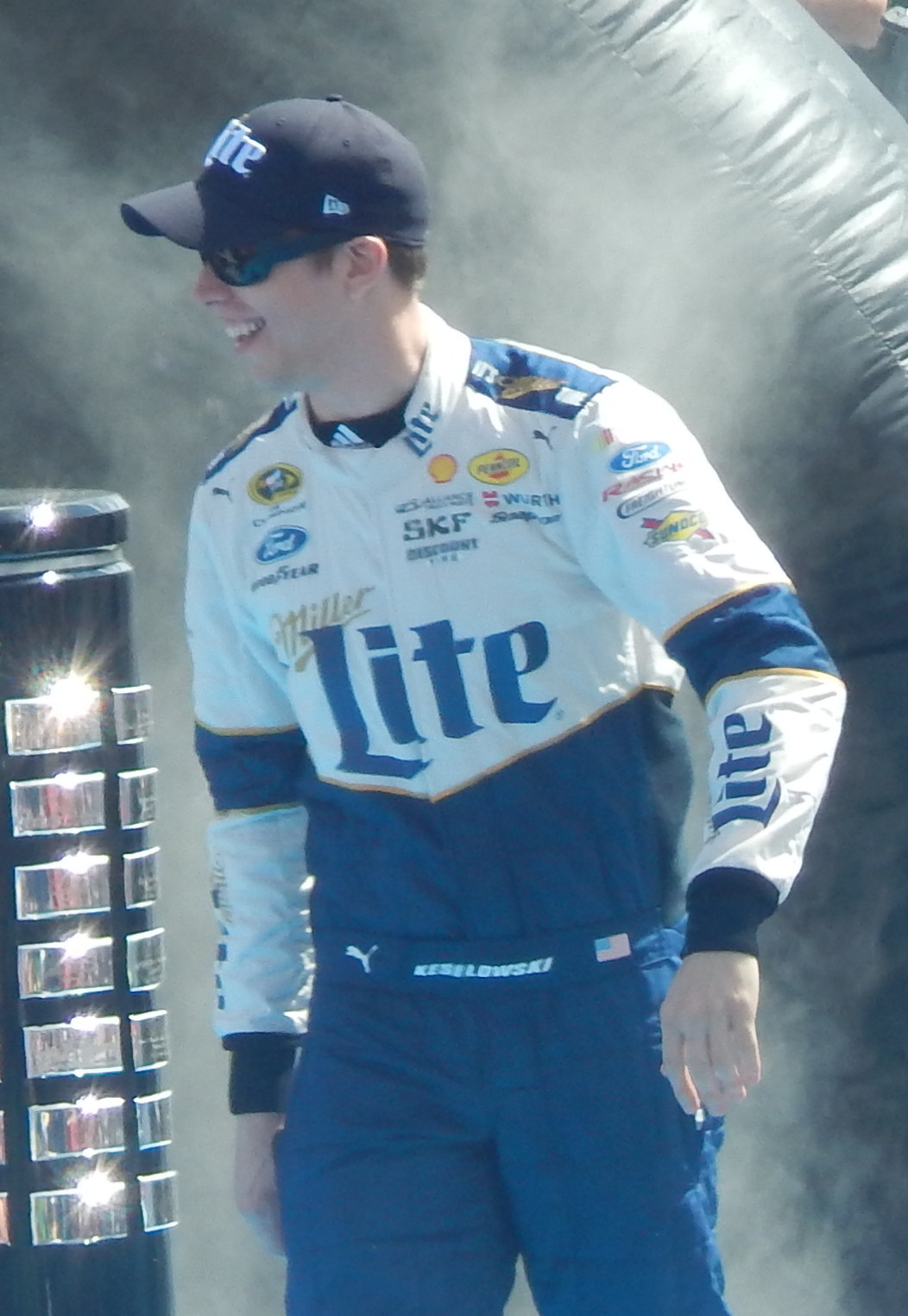
Brad Keselowski scored the pole for the race.

Brad Keselowski won the pole with a time of 27.421 196.929 mph (316.927 km/h). He said that his "Wurth Ford Fusion has been really good since we unloaded. Very similar to where we were at Kansas - really fast in practice and really fast in qualifying. But we just need that to stay with us in the race and we didn't get that in Kansas." He also joked that his team will "have the first pit stall and we get to keep it this time. We are really excited about the race Sunday.” Kevin Harvick, who qualified second, said that he practically "ran the same speed in all three rounds there. Didn’t quite have the raw speed in the first round, but this is a racetrack where you want the car to keep going as long as you can. Felt like we had a good start to our race trim practice today and going to have a good spot to start on Sunday.” Kyle Busch, who qualified third, said that while his team doesn't "need to win...we would love to win. I feel like this is a good opportunity for us to have a really good day and for us to score a victory. We come to every race trying to win and this one’s no different. I hope that Texas will bode well for us and we can score that win. If not, a solid top-five finish is exactly what we need. That’s where we need to be at the end of the day and carry on that momentum and go into Phoenix and hope for another solid day there.” Joey Logano, who qualified fourth, said while he doesn't "think we are bad in race trim...I do think we have a little bit of work to do there, so I am anxious to get at that tomorrow and get to work on it and find a little bit more speed for Sunday." Erik Jones, who qualified sixth driving in place of the suspended Matt Kenseth, said that his qualifying run was "a really good effort for us. We made the final round at Kansas as well so it’s cool to make the final round in both our starts. We’ll see where it goes from here, obviously we’ve got a long ways to go yet for Sunday – 500 miles. This definitely helps everybody’s confidence a little bit for that.” Martin Truex Jr., who qualified 23rd, said that his car "never really clicked in qualifying trim today and that's why we're starting in the middle of the pack. But we've been there before and fought our way to the front. As I keep on saying this team never quits. We're always working hard to find the right combination and I am hopeful that our car will perform better in race trim during tomorrow's two practice sessions."

=== Qualifying results ===
Pos	No.	Driver	Team	Manufacturer	R1	R2	R3
1	2	Brad Keselowski	Team Penske	Ford	27.234	27.348	27.421
2	4	Kevin Harvick	Stewart–Haas Racing	Chevrolet	27.526	27.475	27.552
3	18	Kyle Busch	Joe Gibbs Racing	Toyota	27.395	27.540	27.591
4	22	Joey Logano	Team Penske	Ford	27.375	27.457	27.633
5	42	Kyle Larson	Chip Ganassi Racing	Chevrolet	27.418	27.601	27.644
6	20	Erik Jones (i)	Joe Gibbs Racing	Toyota	27.492	27.613	27.650
7	41	Kurt Busch	Stewart–Haas Racing	Chevrolet	27.377	27.530	27.694
8	48	Jimmie Johnson	Hendrick Motorsports	Chevrolet	27.494	27.571	27.708
9	11	Denny Hamlin	Joe Gibbs Racing	Toyota	27.416	27.593	27.740
10	88	Dale Earnhardt Jr.	Hendrick Motorsports	Chevrolet	27.399	27.630	27.767
11	10	Danica Patrick	Stewart–Haas Racing	Chevrolet	27.555	27.640	27.934
12	16	Greg Biffle	Roush Fenway Racing	Ford	27.561	27.632	28.361
13	19	Carl Edwards	Joe Gibbs Racing	Toyota	27.581	27.644	—
14	15	Clint Bowyer	Michael Waltrip Racing	Toyota	27.418	27.646	—
15	55	David Ragan	Michael Waltrip Racing	Toyota	27.596	27.667	—
16	5	Kasey Kahne	Hendrick Motorsports	Chevrolet	27.524	27.672	—
17	13	Casey Mears	Germain Racing	Chevrolet	27.572	27.718	—
18	24	Jeff Gordon	Hendrick Motorsports	Chevrolet	27.535	27.744	—
19	31	Ryan Newman	Richard Childress Racing	Chevrolet	27.433	27.755	—
20	27	Paul Menard	Richard Childress Racing	Chevrolet	27.504	27.810	—
21	33	Brian Scott (i)	Hillman-Circle Sport LLC	Chevrolet	27.612	27.810	—
22	14	Tony Stewart (Note: Tony Stewart started from the rear of the field for missing driver introductions.)	Stewart–Haas Racing	Chevrolet	27.375	27.819	—
23	78	Martin Truex Jr.	Furniture Row Racing	Chevrolet	27.608	27.835	—
24	43	Aric Almirola	Richard Petty Motorsports	Ford	27.558	27.883	—
25	21	Ryan Blaney (i)	Wood Brothers Racing	Ford	27.618	—	—
26	3	Austin Dillon	Richard Childress Racing	Chevrolet	27.622	—	—
27	1	Jamie McMurray	Chip Ganassi Racing	Chevrolet	27.645	—	—
28	17	Ricky Stenhouse Jr.	Roush Fenway Racing	Ford	27.670	—	—
29	6	Trevor Bayne	Roush Fenway Racing	Ford	27.672	—	—
30	47	A. J. Allmendinger	JTG Daugherty Racing	Chevrolet	27.730	—	—
31	7	Alex Bowman	Tommy Baldwin Racing	Chevrolet	27.743	—	—
32	9	Sam Hornish Jr.	Richard Petty Motorsports	Ford	27.746	—	—
33	95	Michael McDowell	Leavine Family Racing	Ford	27.911	—	—
34	26	J. J. Yeley (i)	BK Racing	Toyota	27.988	—	—
35	34	Brett Moffitt (R)	Front Row Motorsports	Ford	28.030	—	—
36	40	Landon Cassill (i)	Hillman-Circle Sport LLC	Chevrolet	28.060	—	—
37	46	Michael Annett	HScott Motorsports	Chevrolet	28.077	—	—
38	83	Matt DiBenedetto (R)	BK Racing	Toyota	28.085	—	—
39	35	Cole Whitt	Front Row Motorsports	Ford	28.185	—	—
40	23	Jeb Burton (R)	BK Racing	Toyota	28.193	—	—
41	38	David Gilliland	Front Row Motorsports	Ford	28.236	—	—
42	98	Ryan Preece (Note: Ryan Preece started from the rear of the field after changing engines.)	Premium Motorsports	Ford	28.318	—	—
43	51	Justin Allgaier	HScott Motorsports	Chevrolet	28.483	—	—
Failed to qualify
44	32	Joey Gase (i)	Go FAS Racing	Ford	28.329	—	—
45	62	Reed Sorenson	Premium Motorsports	Chevrolet	28.744	—	—
Official qualifying results

== Race ==
=== First half ===
==== Start ====
Under clear blue Texas skies, Brad Keselowski led the field to the green flag at 2:21 p.m. After the first 10 laps, he pulled to a second and a half lead over Kevin Harvick. The first caution of the race flew on lap 11 for a single–car wreck in turn 4. Halfway down the backstretch, the left-rear tire on Joey Logano's car went flat. He couldn't control the car rounding turn 3 and spun out. The damage to his fender was significant and he went a number of laps down while his crew tried to repair it. Eventually, crew chief Todd Gordon told him to take the car to the garage. Logano said afterwards that the left-rear tire "just blew apart off of Turn 2. [It] came apart and shredded everything inside the car. It did a lot more damage than just the tire blowing apart." He also said that this race "was a must-win situation as well. If we finished second today we would be in the same boat going into Phoenix. I feel great about our chances at Phoenix. It has been a great race track for us in the past. I felt like this track was a great one for us as well. It is unfortunate that we finished how we did.”

The race restarted on lap 18. Harvick and Keselowski dragged raced down the front stretch with the former take the lead on lap 19. The second caution of the race flew on lap 25 for a single-car wreck in turn 1. Ryan Blaney suffered a right-front tire blowout and slammed the wall in turn 1 and would go on to finish 43rd. Because this happened a lap before the scheduled competition caution, NASCAR race control decided to treat this as the competition caution. This meant teams could refuel the cars. Matt DiBenedetto opted not to pit and assumed the lead. He pitted the next lap and handed the lead back to Keselowski. A. J. Allmendinger was tagged for an uncontrolled tire and restarted the race from the tail-end of the field. Aric Almirola was tagged for having too many crew members over the wall and restarted the race from the tail-end of the field. Denny Hamlin took his car to the garage for issues with his fuel pump.

The race restarted on lap 30. The third caution of the race flew on lap 36 for a single-car incident in turn 1. Rounding the front stretch, Harvick's left-rear tire went down and he dove down onto the apron. After the race, crew chief Rodney Childers said that the car "had that left-rear go down and automatically you panic and think it was self-inflicted like maybe we didn’t have enough air in it, that kind of thing. As soon as I got down off the (pit) box, I saw a piece cut right in the tread. It was probably out of one of the cars that was tore up earlier."

The race restarted on lap 42. Kyle Busch edged Keselowski for the lead the next lap, but he lost it to the No. 2 car the next lap. Dale Earnhardt Jr. made an unscheduled stop for a flat right-front tire. The fourth caution of the race flew on lap 51 for a single-car spin on the front stretch. Exiting turn 4, Tony Stewart got loose and spun out into the grass. Keselowski exited pit road with the lead. Almirola was tagged again for having too many crew members over the wall and restarted the race from the tail-end of the field.

The race restarted on lap 58. Debris on the front stretch brought out the fifth caution of the race on lap 100. The debris was a shredded left-rear tire from Kyle Larson's car.

==== Second quarter ====
The race restarted on lap 107. Ryan Newman made an unscheduled stop at lap 146 after cutting down his left-rear tire exiting turn 2. This left debris on the backstretch and brought out the sixth caution of the race on lap 149. Kasey Kahne was tagged for speeding on pit road and restarted the race from the tail-end of the field.

The race restarted on lap 155. Dale Earnhardt Jr. tagged the wall with his right-rear corner. This affected the handling of his car and he began to fall back through the field. He spun in the turn 3 apron and brought out the seventh caution of the race on lap 167. A. J. Allmendinger was tagged for an uncontrolled tire and restarted the race from the tail-end of the field.

=== Second half ===
==== Halfway ====
The race restarted on lap 173. Debris in turn 2 brought out the eighth caution of the race on lap 196. The debris came from the shredded right-rear tire of Trevor Bayne's car. Dale Earnhardt Jr. was tagged for having too many crew members over the wall and restarted the race from the tail-end of the field. Joey Logano was tagged for speeding on pit road and restarted the race from the tail-end of the field.

The race restarted on lap 204. Kyle Busch and Carl Edwards kicked off a cycle of green flag stops with 84 laps to go. Brad Keselowski pitted with 83 laps to go and handed the lead to Jimmie Johnson. He pitted the next lap and the lead cycled back to Keselowski.

==== Fourth quarter ====
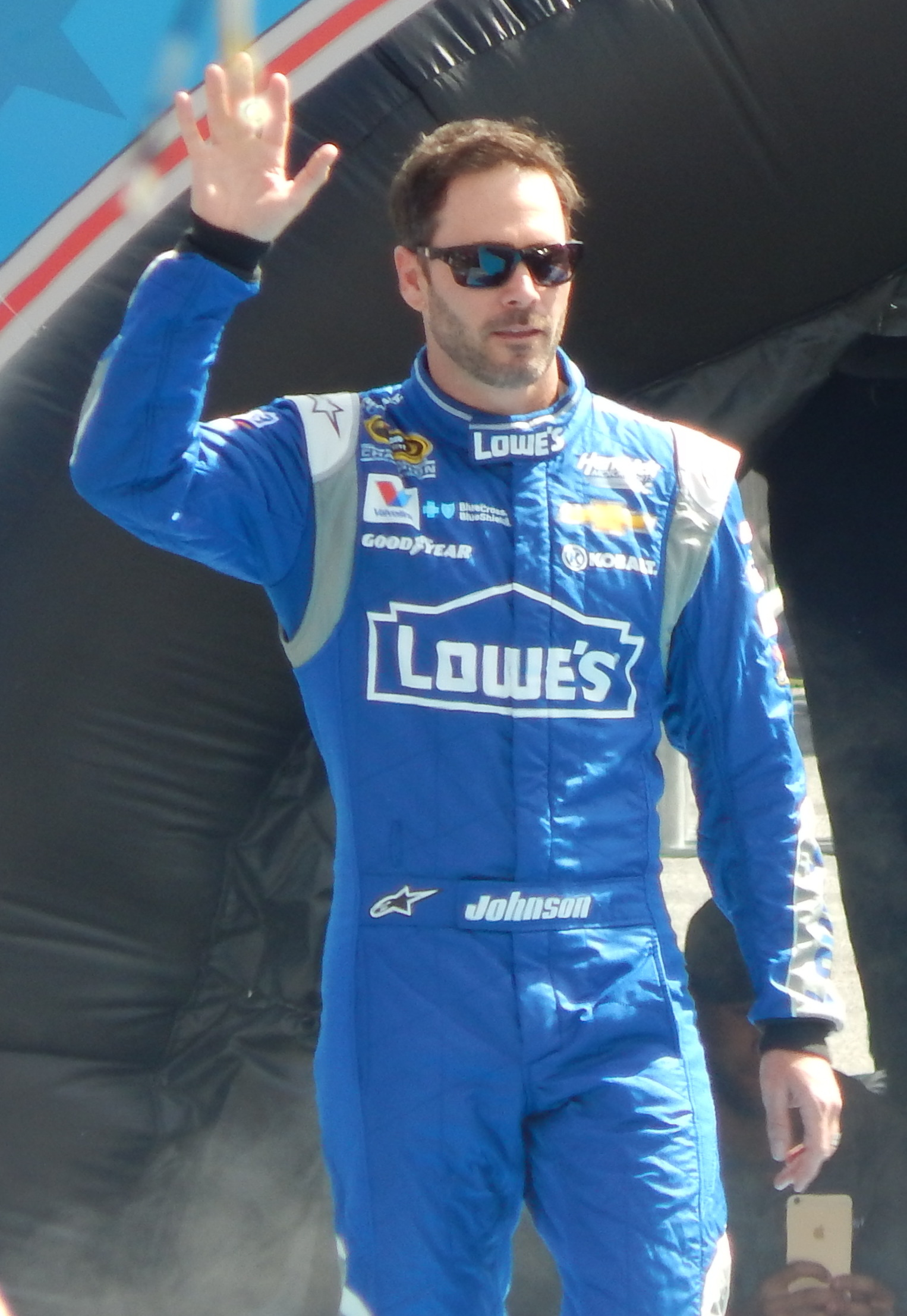
Jimmie Johnson, seen here at the 2015 Daytona 500, scored his 75th victory at Texas.

Kevin Harvick made an unscheduled stop with 53 laps to go for a flat right-rear tire. He fell to 20th–place in the running order and down a lap. Carl Edwards kicked off the final cycle of pit stops with 38 laps to go. Keselowski hit pit road with 37 laps to go and the lead cycled to Harvick. Denny Hamlin was tagged for speeding on pit road and was forced to serve a drive-through penalty. On 16-lap older tires, he was no match for Keselowski as he was passed with ease with 35 laps to go.

Debris in turn 2 brought out the ninth caution of the race with 24 laps to go. The debris was a shredded right front tire from Erik Jones.

The race restarted with 18 laps to go. Martin Truex Jr. edged out Keselowski to take the lead with 17 to go, but Keselowski took it back the next lap. Jimmie Johnson kept the pressure on him for the next 12 laps. He took the lead with three laps to go and scored his 75th career win.

== Post-race ==
=== Driver comments ===
After the race, Johnson said that he "just kept pressure on him (Keselowski). I could see that he was really tight and that was the first I had seen him that vulnerable all day. I just kept the pressure on him, kept searching for line. He saw me coming on the top and protected it. I just kept trying to put pressure on him hoping for a mistake. He got real loose off of Turn 2 and I had a big run down the backstretch and drove it in really far into Turn 3 hoping to hear clear. Once I did I knew I was home free.”

Keselowski said that Johnson's "car had mega turn that last run and I couldn’t keep the turn and it kept pushing real bad. I did everything I could to hold him off but he was way faster that last run." Despite sitting 19–points out of the fourth–place Chase cutoff, he said he wasn't "sure exactly how to feel about it at the moment. The 48 car had so much speed them last 10 laps. Maybe I'll change my mind [but] I don't know what I would have done differently or could have done differently. There's always something you can do better. But not knowing what that might be at this moment makes it a little bit easier to digest."

Following a third–place finish, Harvick said that his team has "had to overcome things week after week after week. I guess those are character-building moments as you go through those weekend, but we’ve managed to survive and advance and that’s what we’ve got to do next week.” With the next race being Phoenix, he also said that the track is "definitely a good place for us to go. It’s been very successful but that doesn’t mean we’re going to go there and run good this time. We’ve got to go and try and have our ducks in a row. We’ve done a good job managing the Chase so far with all the adversity we’ve had. We’ve only really had one smooth weekend, so we’ve just got to keep doing what we’re doing and hopefully the smooth weekend is the next week and the week after.”

Kyle Busch said of his fourth–place finish that it ended up being "a really good day for us. Obviously, just being able to run our own race and to perform the way we did, I felt like it was pretty good. I wish we had a little bit faster car on the short runs for sure. I think that was kind of where we lost most of our time here today. Once things got single filed out, spread out, our car was a little better on the long runs. At least we did have some speed in our car on one side of the run where we could make up some ground and maintain our position on the racetrack.”

After finishing seventh, Kurt Busch said that his race "was good, hard fought battle with limited practice. We had to go with our best effort to get the set-up. We battled through it. It just wasn’t the winning car we needed to try to advance. The way that we had been running we knew we could get close to fifth. We got seventh today so we will take it.”

Following an eighth–place finish, Martin Truex Jr. said that he "thought we had a shot at it (the win) and the right-front wheel started shaking real bad and got tight. It's a damn shame. It's a good run. ... We had a really good race car." Sitting fourth in the standings six–points back of the lead, he said it certainly helped that "[t]he 2 didn't win the race...I was cheering for Jimmie Johnson pretty hard. We did what we needed to do. It would have been nice to have those five or six spots -- that's five or six points next week. It could be the difference. But we'll just have to wait and see and we'll go race hard again."

Speaking on a ninth–place finish, Jeff Gordon – who's locked into the championship race following his win at Martinsville the week before – said he "thought we learned a lot this weekend. I think we certainly know that our cars are fast because our teammate won. Congrats to him. I think that's awesome he beat the No. 2 (Brad Keselowski). That is spectacular, I'm going to give him a big hug for that. At the same time I think that we were here to execute and push hard, try to win, but also to just learn what we could. I thought we learned some stuff."

Following a 12th–place finish in only his second career Sprint Cup Series start, Erik Jones – who also finished fourth in the Xfinity Series race the previous day and won the Camping World Truck Series race two days prior – said that he was "ready to take the day off. I don’t think I’ve ever run more than two races – a Truck and Xfinity race – in more than one weekend. At this point, I’m feeling fine, but I can definitely feeling it coming on. I’ll be worn out tonight.” He also said that he wished his car "could have been a little stronger there at the end. We had that right front go down and it tore the nose up pretty good, so kind of took us out of a shot at a top-10. To still come home 12th is a good day for us. We worked hard all day to really keep the thing balanced and good and strong.”

== Race results ==
Pos	No.	Driver	Team	Manufacturer	Laps	Points
1	48	Jimmie Johnson	Hendrick Motorsports	Chevrolet	334	47
2	2	Brad Keselowski	Team Penske	Ford	334	44
3	4	Kevin Harvick	Stewart–Haas Racing	Chevrolet	334	42
4	18	Kyle Busch	Joe Gibbs Racing	Toyota	334	41
5	19	Carl Edwards	Joe Gibbs Racing	Toyota	334	39
6	88	Dale Earnhardt Jr.	Hendrick Motorsports	Chevrolet	334	38
7	41	Kurt Busch	Stewart–Haas Racing	Chevrolet	334	37
8	78	Martin Truex Jr.	Furniture Row Racing	Chevrolet	334	37
9	24	Jeff Gordon	Hendrick Motorsports	Chevrolet	334	35
10	1	Jamie McMurray	Chip Ganassi Racing	Chevrolet	334	34
11	3	Austin Dillon	Richard Childress Racing	Chevrolet	334	33
12	20	Erik Jones (i)	Joe Gibbs Racing	Toyota	334	0
13	27	Paul Menard	Richard Childress Racing	Chevrolet	334	31
14	33	Brian Scott (i)	Hillman-Circle Sport LLC	Chevrolet	334	0
15	15	Clint Bowyer	Michael Waltrip Racing	Toyota	334	29
16	10	Danica Patrick	Stewart–Haas Racing	Chevrolet	334	28
17	47	A. J. Allmendinger	JTG Daugherty Racing	Chevrolet	334	27
18	43	Aric Almirola	Richard Petty Motorsports	Ford	334	26
19	16	Greg Biffle	Roush Fenway Racing	Ford	333	25
20	5	Kasey Kahne	Hendrick Motorsports	Chevrolet	333	24
21	17	Ricky Stenhouse Jr.	Roush Fenway Racing	Ford	333	23
22	31	Ryan Newman	Richard Childress Racing	Chevrolet	333	22
23	55	David Ragan	Michael Waltrip Racing	Toyota	333	21
24	9	Sam Hornish Jr.	Richard Petty Motorsports	Ford	332	20
25	40	Landon Cassill (i)	Hillman-Circle Sport LLC	Chevrolet	331	0
26	13	Casey Mears	Germain Racing	Chevrolet	330	18
27	35	Cole Whitt	Front Row Motorsports	Ford	330	17
28	51	Justin Allgaier	HScott Motorsports	Chevrolet	330	16
29	38	David Gilliland	Front Row Motorsports	Ford	329	16
30	34	Brett Moffitt (R)	Front Row Motorsports	Ford	329	14
31	46	Michael Annett	HScott Motorsports	Chevrolet	329	13
32	23	Jeb Burton (R)	BK Racing	Toyota	329	12
33	26	J. J. Yeley (i)	BK Racing	Toyota	329	0
34	95	Michael McDowell	Leavine Family Racing	Ford	328	10
35	83	Matt DiBenedetto (R)	BK Racing	Toyota	328	9
36	98	Ryan Preece	Premium Motorsports	Ford	326	8
37	42	Kyle Larson	Chip Ganassi Racing	Chevrolet	304	7
38	11	Denny Hamlin	Joe Gibbs Racing	Toyota	304	6
39	6	Trevor Bayne	Roush Fenway Racing	Ford	296	5
40	22	Joey Logano	Team Penske	Ford	268	4
41	7	Alex Bowman	Tommy Baldwin Racing	Chevrolet	236	3
42	14	Tony Stewart	Stewart–Haas Racing	Chevrolet	52	2
43	21	Ryan Blaney (i)	Wood Brothers Racing	Ford	26	0
Official AAA Texas 500 results

=== Race statistics ===
- 15 lead changes among 8 different drivers
- 9 cautions for 47 laps
- Time of race: 3 hours, 38 minutes, 38 seconds
- Average speed: 137.490 mph (221.269 km/h)
- Jimmie Johnson took home $462,976 in winnings

Lap Leaders
Laps	Leader
1-17	Brad Keselowski
18-26	Kevin Harvick
27	Matt DiBenedetto (R)
28-41	Brad Keselowski
42	Kyle Busch
43-53	Brad Keselowski
54	David Gilliland
55	J. J. Yeley (i)
56-251	Brad Keselowski
252-253	Jimmie Johnson
254-297	Brad Keselowski
298-299	Kevin Harvick
300-316	Brad Keselowski
317	Martin Truex Jr.
318-330	Brad Keselowski
331-334	Jimmie Johnson

Total laps led
Leader	Laps
Brad Keselowski	312
Kevin Harvick	11
Jimmie Johnson	6
Kyle Busch	1
Martin Truex Jr.	1
David Gilliland	1
J. J. Yeley (i)	1
Matt DiBenedetto (R)	1

==== Race awards ====
- Coors Light Pole Award: Brad Keselowski (27.421, 196.929 mph (316.927 km/h)
- 3M Lap Leader: Brad Keselowski (312 laps)
- American Ethanol Green Flag Restart Award: Brad Keselowski
- Duralast Brakes "Bake In The Race" Award: Brad Keselowski
- Freescale "Wide Open": Carl Edwards
- Ingersoll Rand Power Move: Kurt Busch (5 positions)
- MAHLE Clevite Engine Builder of the Race: Roush-Yates Engines, #2
- Mobil 1 Driver of the Race: Brad Keselowski (145.0 driver rating)
- Moog Steering and Suspension Problem Solver of The Race: Jamie McMurray (crew chief Matt McCall (0.164 seconds))
- NASCAR Sprint Cup Leader Bonus: No winner: rolls over to $20,000 at next event
- Sherwin-Williams Fastest Lap: Kyle Busch (Lap 2, 28.097, 192.191 mph (309.301 km/h))
- Sunoco Rookie of The Race: Brett Moffitt

== Media ==
=== Television ===
NBC covered the race on the television side. Rick Allen, two–time Texas winner Jeff Burton and Steve Letarte had the call in the booth for the race. Dave Burns, Mike Massaro, Marty Snider and Kelli Stavast handled pit road on the television side.

NBC
Booth announcers	Pit reporters
Lap-by-lap: Rick Allen; Color-commentator: Jeff Burton; Color-commentator: Steve Letarte	Dave Burns; Mike Massaro; Marty Snider; Kelli Stavast

=== Radio ===
PRN had the radio call for the race, which was simulcast on Sirius XM NASCAR Radio. Doug Rice, Mark Garrow and Wendy Venturini called the race from the booth when the field was racing down the frontstretch. Rob Albright called the race from atop the turn 2 condo when the field was racing through turns 1 and 2. Pat Patterson called the race from atop the turn 4 suites when the field was racing through turns 3 and 4. Brad Gillie, Brett McMillan, Jim Noble and Steve Richards handled pit road on the radio side.

PRN
Booth announcers	Turn announcers	Pit reporters
Lead announcer: Doug Rice; Announcer: Mark Garrow; Announcer: Wendy Venturini	Turns 1 & 2: Rob Albright; Turns 3 & 4: Pat Patterson	Brad Gillie; Brett McMillan; Jim Noble; Steve Richards

== Standings after the race ==
Drivers' Championship standings

	Pos	Driver	Points
	1	Jeff Gordon	4,082
	2	Kyle Busch	4,080 (–2)
1	3	Kevin Harvick	4,079 (–3)
1	4	Martin Truex Jr.	4,076 (–6)
	5	Carl Edwards	4,069 (–13)
	6	Brad Keselowski	4,057 (–25)
	7	Kurt Busch	4,048 (–34)
	8	Joey Logano	4,013 (–69)
2	9	Dale Earnhardt Jr.	2,259 (–1,823)
1	10	Denny Hamlin	2,257 (–1,825)
1	11	Ryan Newman	2,253 (–1,829)
2	12	Jimmie Johnson	2,240 (–1,842)
1	13	Jamie McMurray	2,235 (–1,847)
1	14	Paul Menard	2,208 (–1,874)
2	15	Matt Kenseth	2,197 (–1,885)
	16	Clint Bowyer	2,153 (–1,929)

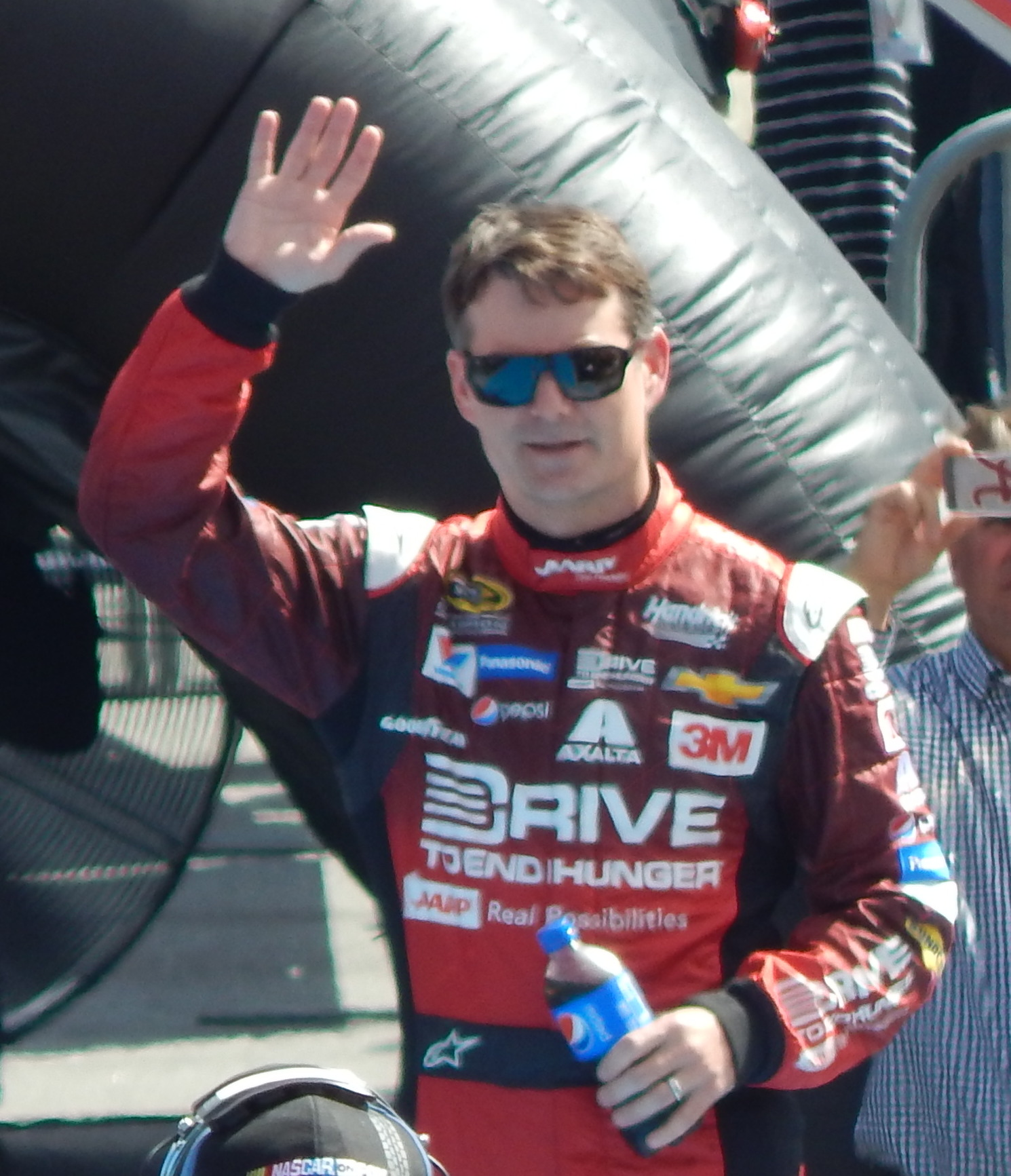
Jeff Gordon left Texas with a two–point lead over Kyle Busch.

Manufacturers' Championship standings

Pos	Manufacturer	Points
1	Chevrolet	1,495
2	Toyota	1,432 (–63)
3	Ford	1,414 (–81)

- Note: Only the first sixteen positions are included for the driver standings.

== Note ==
Previous race: 2015 Goody's Headache Relief Shot 500	Sprint Cup Series; 2015 season	Next race: 2015 Quicken Loans Race for Heroes 500
